= 1954 Atlantic hurricane season =

- Season summary map

Seasonal boundaries
- First system formed: May 27, 1954
- Last system dissipated: January 6, 1955 (tied record latest with 2005)

Strongest storm
- Name: Hazel
  - Maximum winds: 130 mph (215 km/h) (1-minute sustained)
  - Lowest pressure: 938 mbar (hPa; 27.7 inHg)

Seasonal statistics
- Total depressions: 23
- Total storms: 16
- Hurricanes: 7
- Major hurricanes (Cat. 3+): 3
- Total fatalities: 1,069
- Total damage: $751.6 million (1954 USD)

Related articles
- 1954 Pacific hurricane season; 1954 Pacific typhoon season; 1950s North Indian Ocean cyclone seasons

The 1954 Atlantic hurricane season was an above-average Atlantic hurricane season in terms of named storms, with 16 forming. Overall, the season resulted in $751.6 million in damage, (Note: All damage figures in the article are in 1954 United States dollars (USD) unless otherwise stated) the most of any season at the time. The season officially began on June 15, and nine days later the first named storm developed. Hurricane Alice developed in the Gulf of Mexico and moved inland along the Rio Grande, producing significant precipitation and record flooding that killed 55 people. Activity was slow until late August; only Barbara, a minimal tropical storm, developed in July. In the span of two weeks, hurricanes Carol and Edna followed similar paths before both striking New England as major hurricanes. (Note: A major hurricane is a tropical cyclone with maximum sustained winds of at least 111 mph (179 km/h), or a Category 3 or higher on the Saffir–Simpson hurricane scale.) The latter became the costliest hurricane in Maine's history.

In late September, Tropical Storm Gilda killed 29 people after drenching northern Honduras. A tropical depression in early October was captured by a high-altitude photograph on a rocket, thus producing the first large-scale image of a tropical cyclone. The strongest and deadliest hurricane of the season was Hurricane Hazel, which killed thousands in Haiti before striking near the North Carolina/South Carolina border in October. It caused heavy damage in the United States before becoming extratropical and affecting Ontario. Intense rainfall affected Toronto with severe flooding, leaving significant damage. The season officially ended on November 15, although another hurricane named Alice developed on December 30 to the northeast of the Lesser Antilles; it lasted until January 6 of the following year. In total, there were 16 tropical storms, 7 hurricanes, and 3 major hurricanes.

== Season summary ==
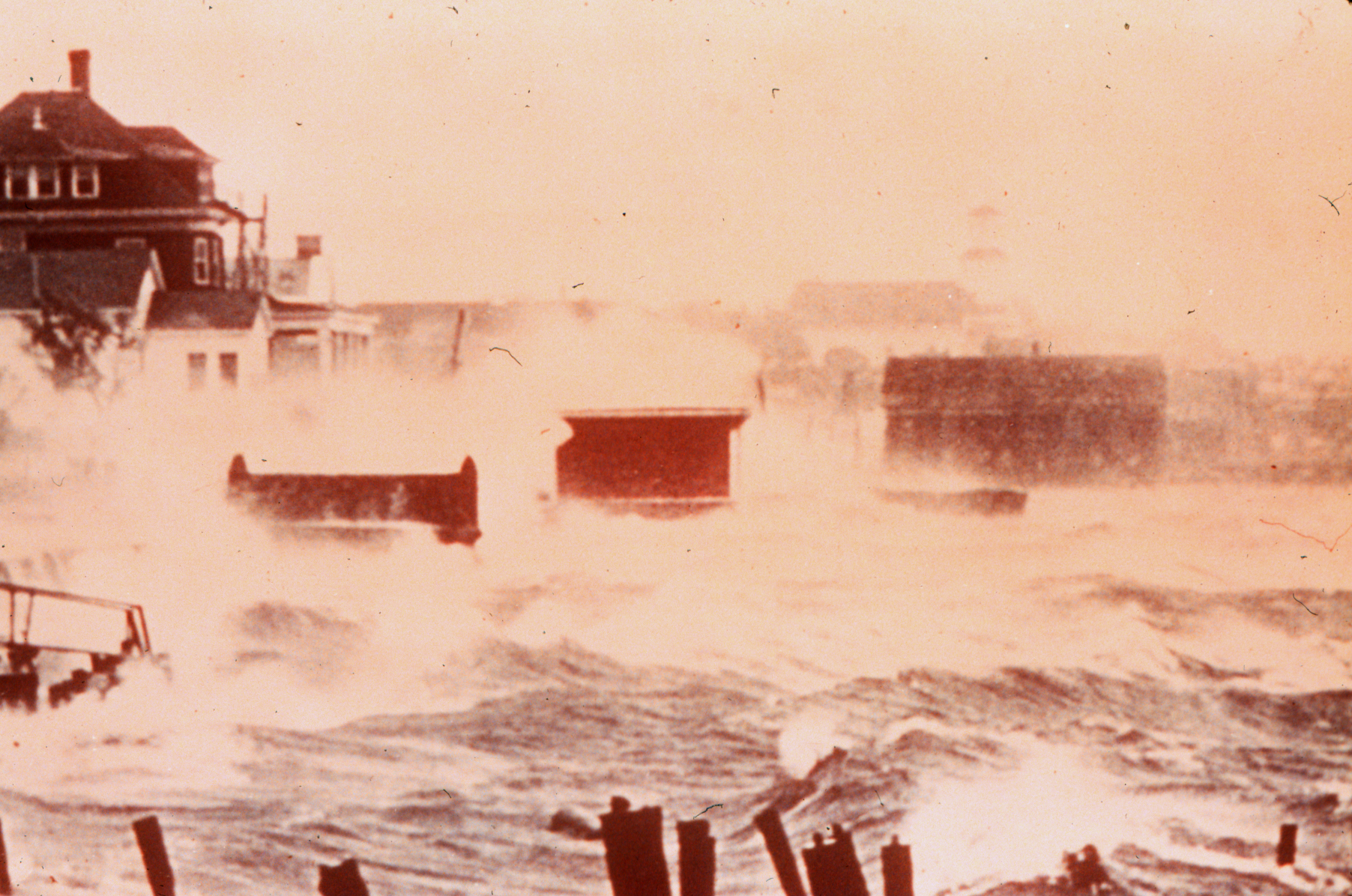
Storm surge damage from Hurricane Carol

The hurricane season officially began on June 15, when the United States Weather Bureau in Miami, Florida, began 24‑hour operations. The agency, under the direction of Grady Norton had access to 43 other weather stations across the Atlantic basin. Norton died during the season from a stroke while tracking Hurricane Hazel. Additionally, a group of Hurricane Hunters planes were put on standby for the season, able to be flown out into storms and collect data. During the season, there were eight named storms, as well as an unnamed hurricane and a tropical depression. The season officially ended on November 15, although an unnamed tropical storm formed a day later. In addition, Tropical Storm Alice developed on December 31, the latest a tropical cyclone has developed in the calendar year.

Cumulatively, tropical cyclones left 193 deaths and $756 million in damage, becoming the costliest hurricane season at the time. The season was one of six to have three major hurricanes strike the country, along with 2005 (which had four), 1893, 1909, 1933, and 2004. Two of the major hurricanes – Carol and Edna – struck New England; this occurred despite an average of only 5–10 New England hurricanes per century. Carol struck Connecticut as a hurricane and left widespread heavy damage. Only ten days later, Edna became the costliest hurricane in Maine's history. The third major hurricane, Hazel, was the strongest hurricane of the season, attaining winds of 150 mph (240 km/h). Unusually, no tropical cyclones affected Florida.

The season's activity was reflected with a cumulative accumulated cyclone energy (ACE) rating of 111, which is categorized as being "above normal". ACE is, broadly speaking, a measure of the power of the hurricane multiplied by the length of time it existed, so storms that last a long time, as well as particularly strong hurricanes, have high ACEs. ACE is only calculated for full advisories on tropical systems at or exceeding 34 knots (39 mph; 63 km/h) or tropical storm strength.

== Systems ==
=== Tropical Storm One ===
- Tropical storm (SSHWS)
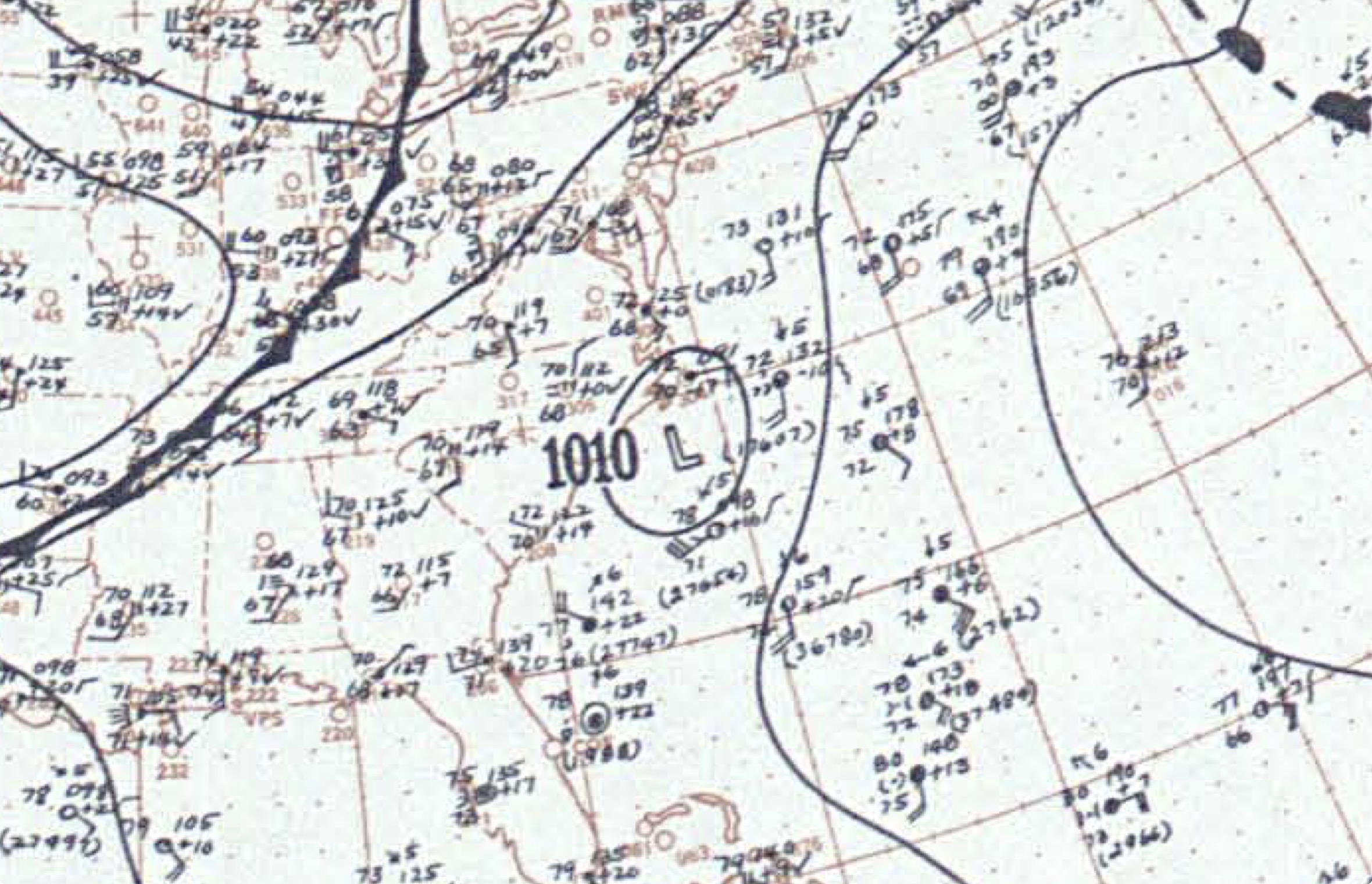
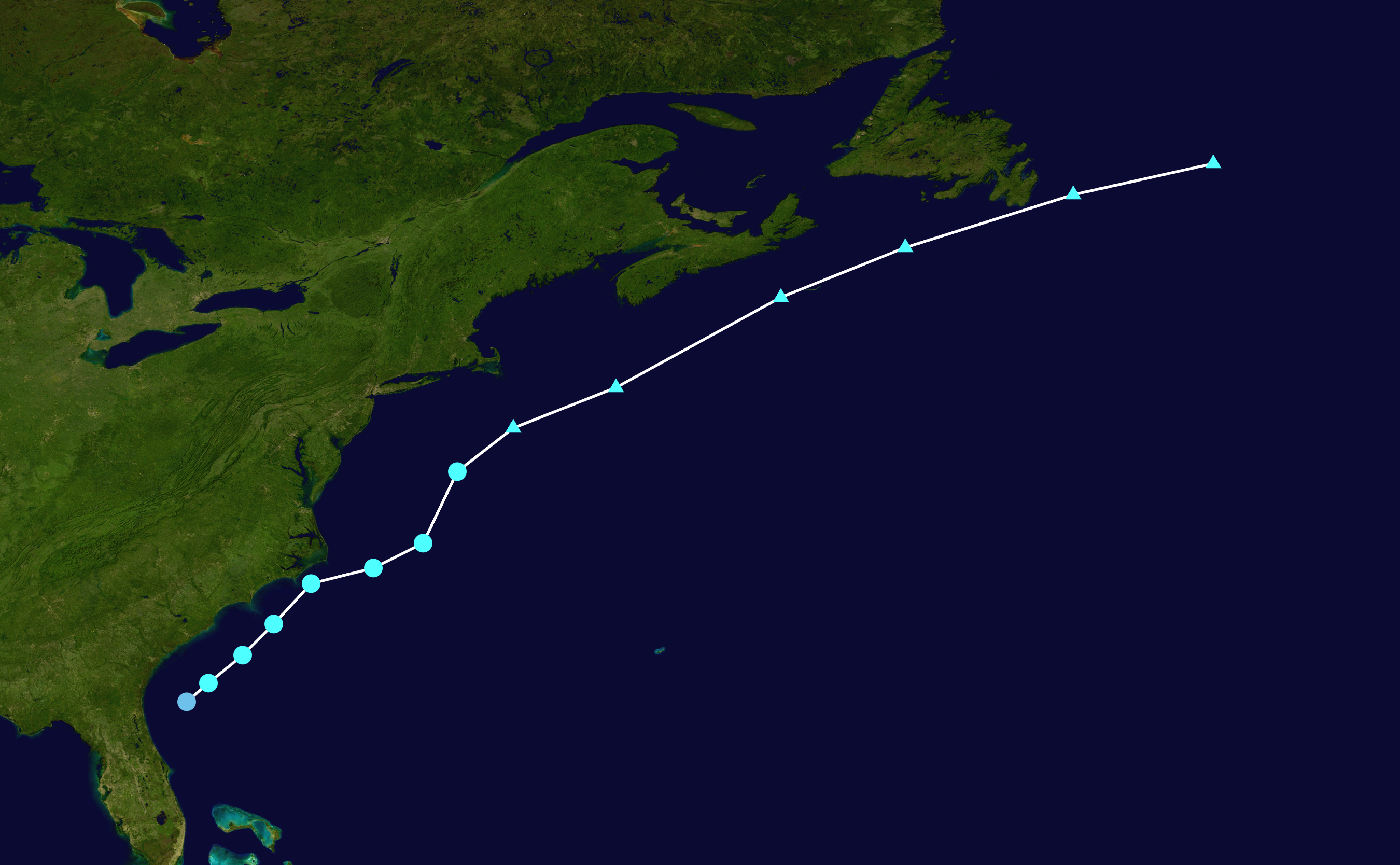
- Duration: May 27 – May 31
- Peak intensity: 50 mph (85 km/h) (1-min); 996 mbar (hPa)

A broad trough developed over the eastern Gulf of Mexico on May 26. A frontal disturbance formed over Florida along the trough, spawning an area of broad cyclonic turning. After emerging into the western Atlantic Ocean, a closed circulation developed within the system, and it is estimated that a tropical depression formed on May 28 about 100 mi (160 km) east of Jacksonville, Florida. Ship observations in the region suggested that the depression intensified into a tropical storm by late on May 28. The system was small, and was not discovered to have been a tropical cyclone until a reanalysis of data in 2015. The storm moved to the northeast ahead of an approaching trough, bypassing the Carolinas to the east; rainfall brushed the coast of North Carolina. On May 29, ship observations suggested peak winds of 50 mph (80 km/h). On the next day, the storm became associated with a warm front, indicating that it became extratropical to the southeast of New England. Continuing to the northeast, the former storm crossed over the southeastern coast of Newfoundland before being absorbed by another nontropical low to the northwest on May 31.

=== Tropical Storm Two ===
- Tropical storm (SSHWS)
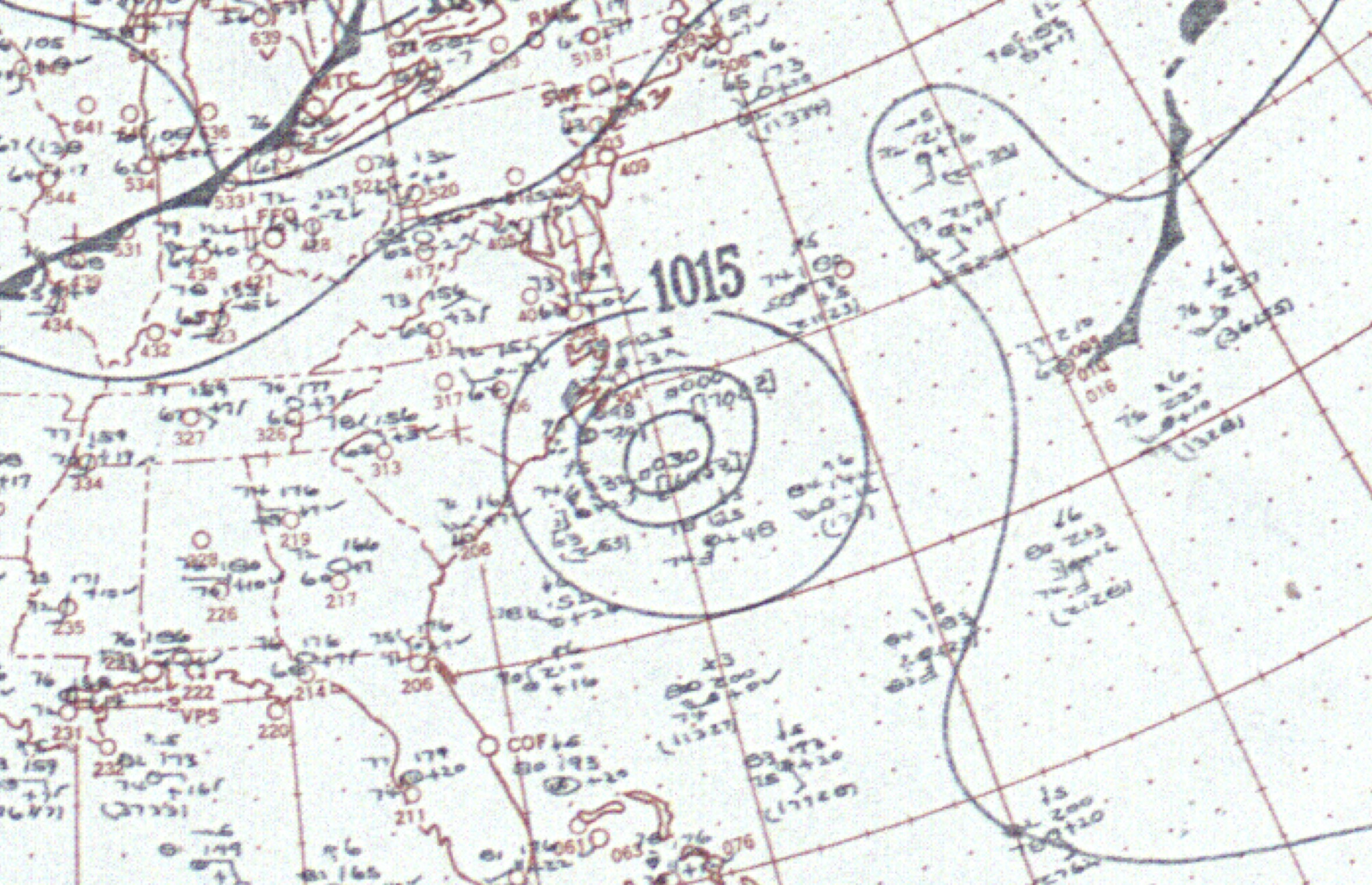
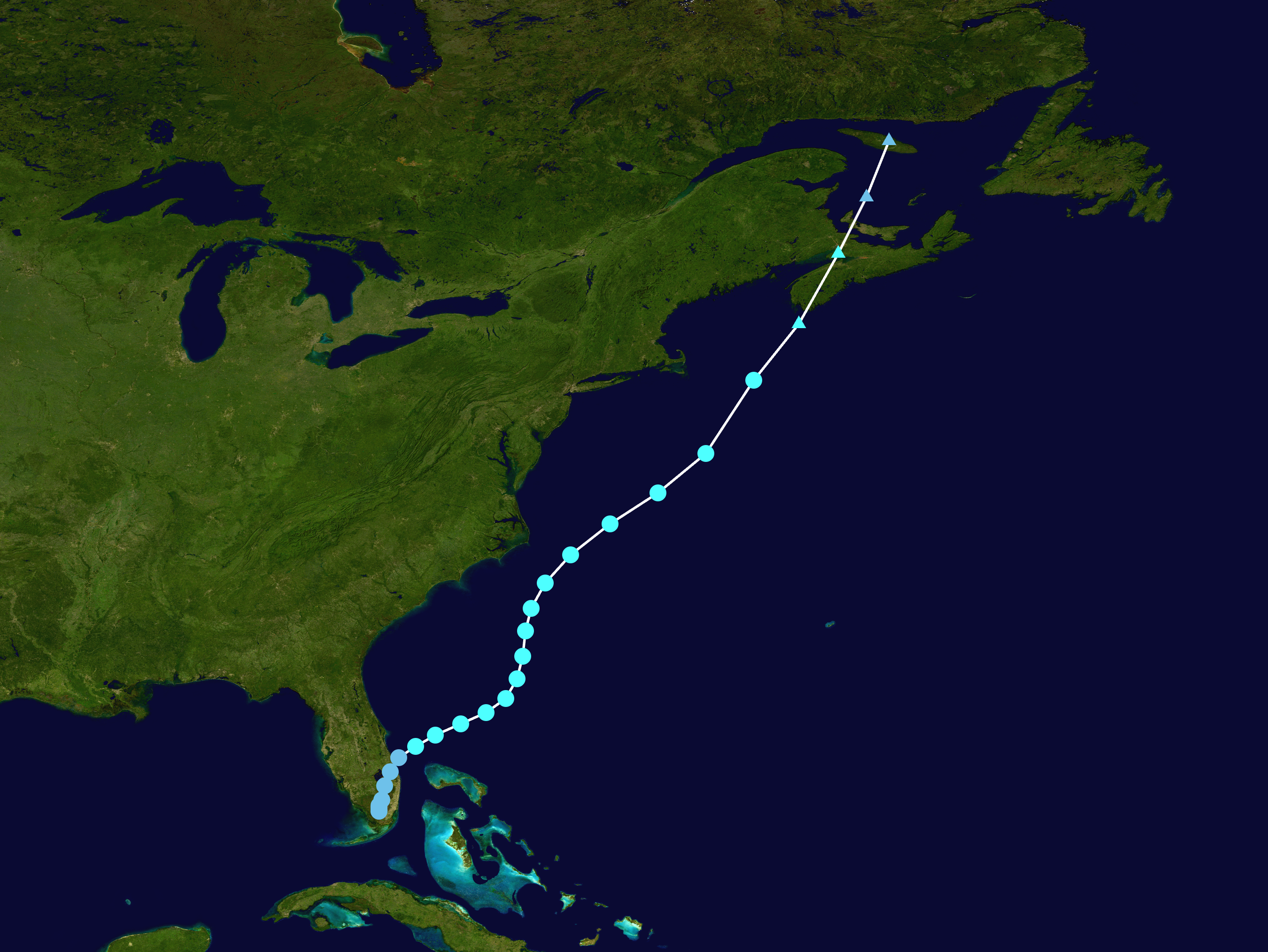
- Duration: June 17 – June 25
- Peak intensity: 70 mph (110 km/h) (1-min); 994 mbar (hPa)

A trough formed over southern Florida on June 17. Early the next day, a circulation formed, signaling that a tropical depression also developed over the Everglades. The system moved slowly north-northeastward, emerging into the western Atlantic Ocean at 06:00 UTC on June 20. Shortly thereafter, the depression intensified into a tropical storm, although the structure was broad and asymmetric due to association with a nearby upper-level low, signaling that the system was possibly a subtropical cyclone. Ship reports in the region indicate that the storm continued to intensify. On June 22, the structure became much more symmetrical while passing just off the Outer Banks, bringing winds of 33 mph (53 km/h) to Wilmington, North Carolina. That day, the Hurricane Hunters estimated winds of 80 mph (130 km/h), and is possible that the storm briefly attained hurricane status. The peak winds were estimated at 70 mph (110 km/h), due to a pressure reading of 994 mbar (29.4 inHg). The storm accelerated northeastward due to an approaching cold front. On June 24, the storm became extratropical, and shortly thereafter made landfall along southwestern Nova Scotia. The system dissipated the next day over the northern Gulf of Saint Lawrence.

=== Hurricane Alice (June) ===
- Category 2 hurricane (SSHWS)
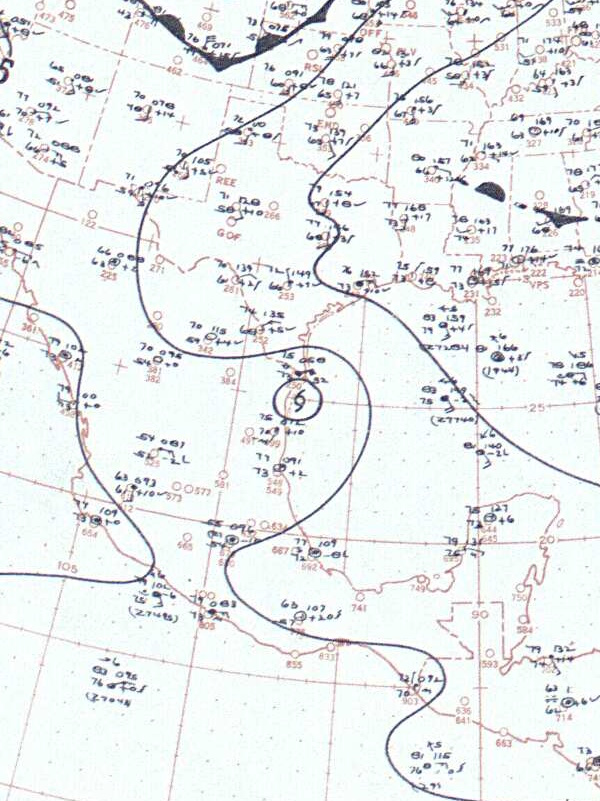
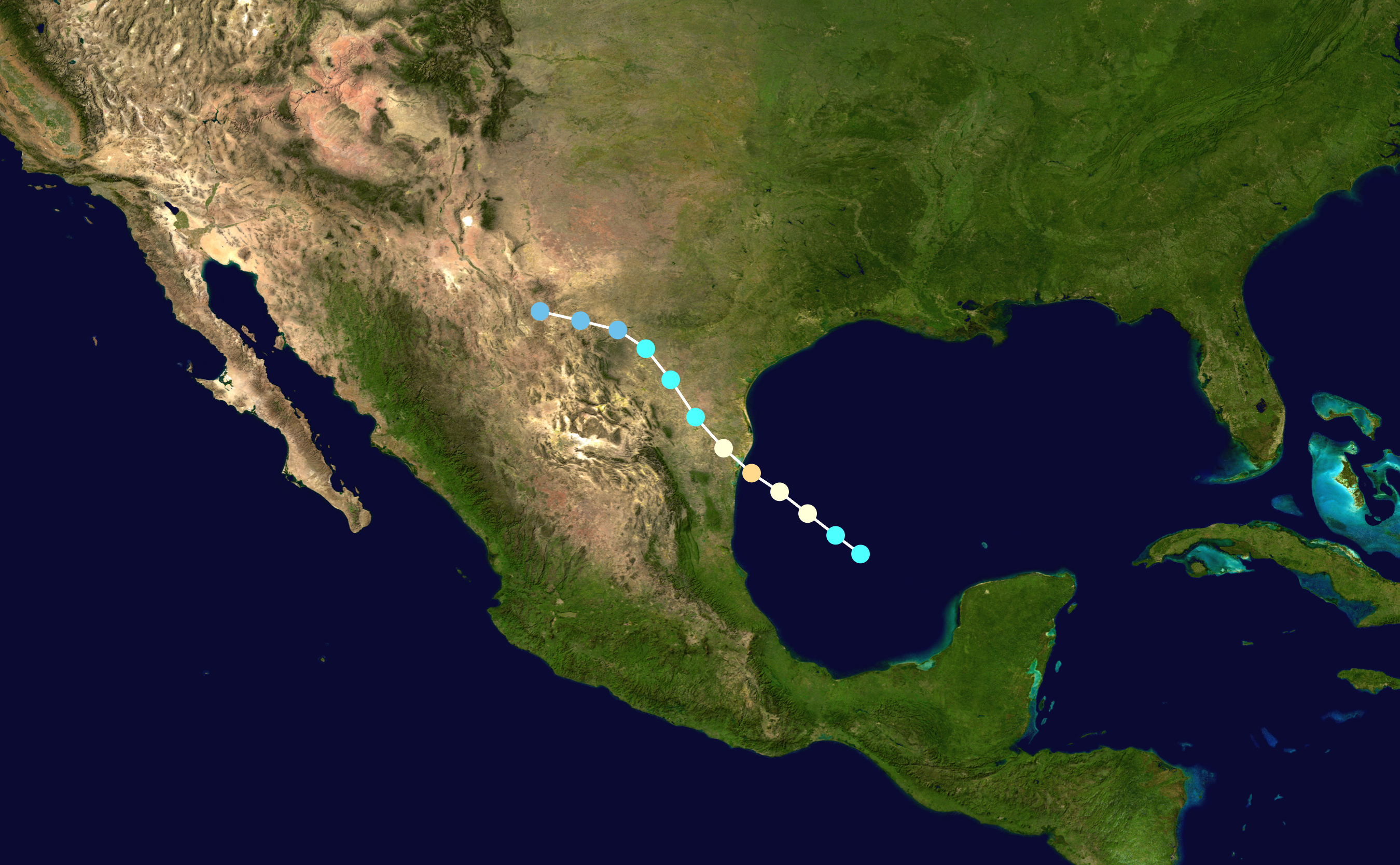
- Duration: June 24 – June 26
- Peak intensity: 110 mph (175 km/h) (1-min); 973 mbar (hPa)

On June 24, Tropical Storm Alice developed. It rapidly intensified in the western Gulf of Mexico, giving the citizens of southern Texas and northeastern Mexico little time to prepare. By June 25, Alice intensified to hurricane status, reaching peak winds of 110 mph (180 km/h) that day, before making landfall in northeastern Mexico, just south of the Mexico–United States border. The storm progressed inland along the Rio Grande Valley, dissipating on June 27.

In Mexico, Alice left minor damage, and killed one person due to a fallen power line. Across Texas, Alice dropped torrential rainfall, peaking at 24.07 in (611 mm) near Pandale, with most of the rainfall concentrated around the Pecos River. High precipitation accumulations occurred in areas that had seen little rains in three years. This led to significant flooding along the Pecos River that produced "probably the greatest rate of runoff for a watershed of [that] size in the United States", as reported by the International Boundary and Water Commission. Ozona, Texas, sustained the most impact, estimated at $2 million in damage. Downstream, the Rio Grande rose to the highest level since 1865, which flooded seven towns on either side of the border; Eagle Pass, Texas, was flooded with 8 ft (2.4 m) of water. Overall there were at least 55 deaths.

=== Tropical Storm Four ===
- Tropical storm (SSHWS)
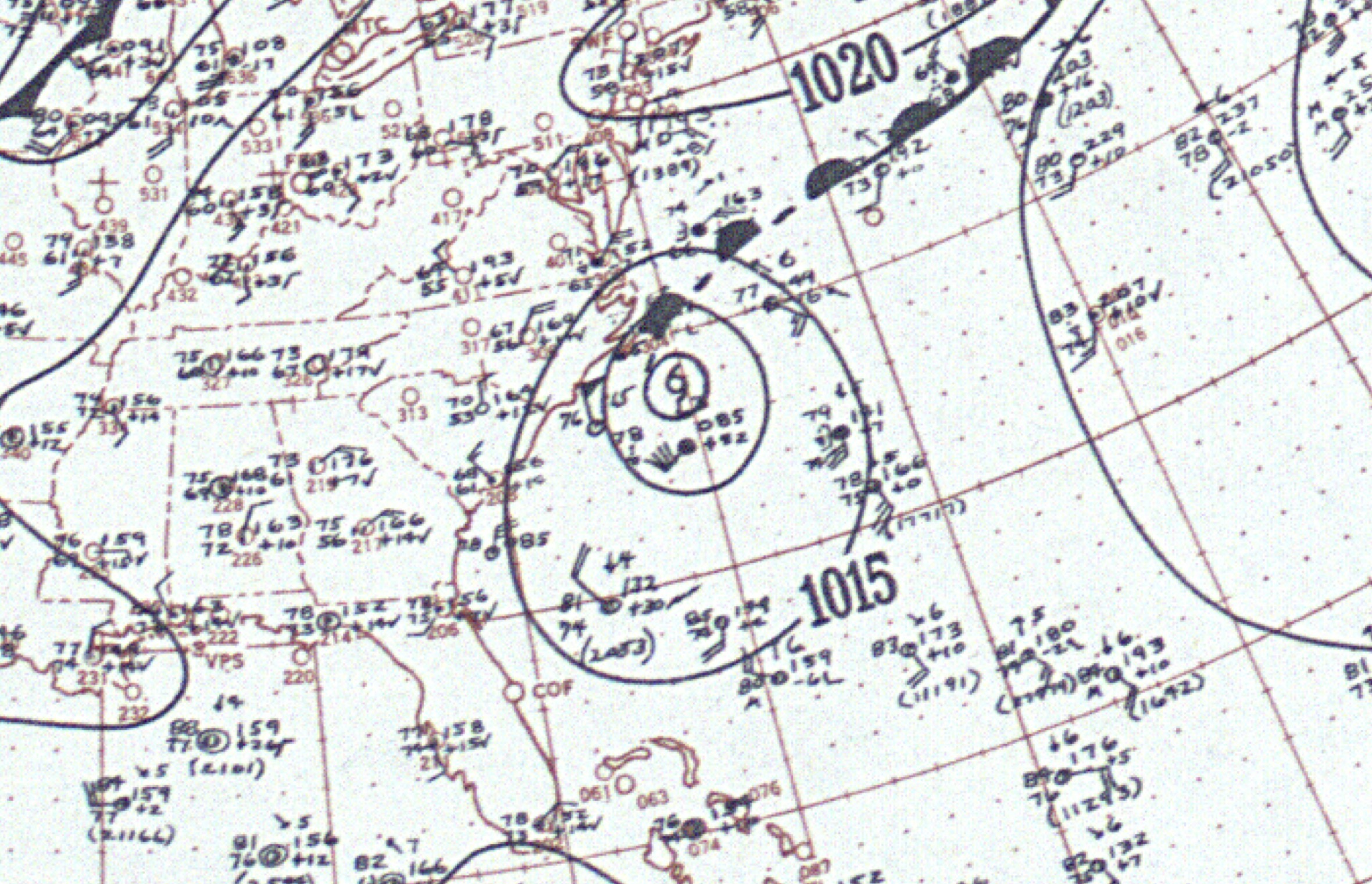
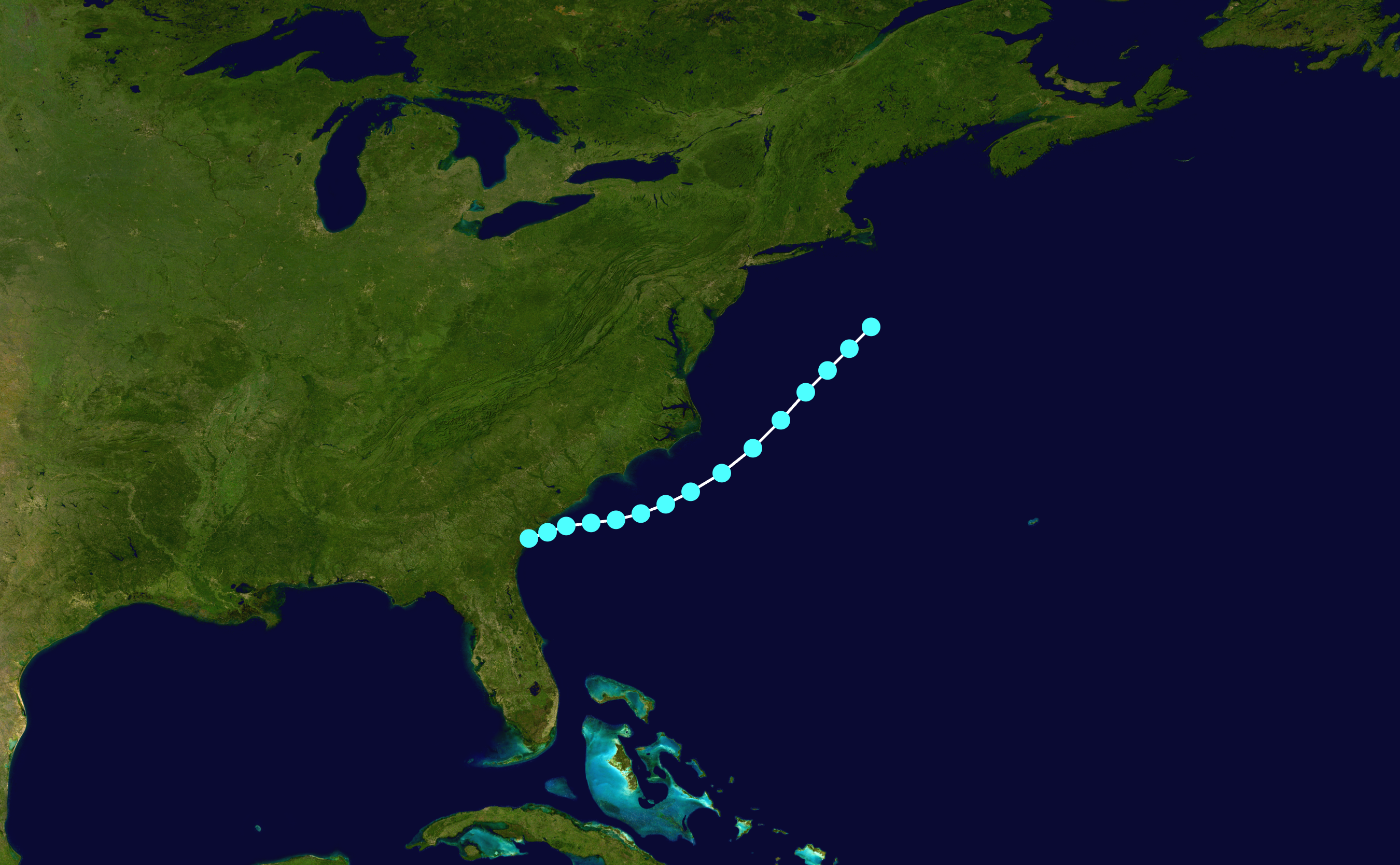
- Duration: July 10 – July 14
- Peak intensity: 50 mph (85 km/h) (1-min); ≤1004 mbar (hPa)

A dissipating cold front stalled over the southeastern United States from Arkansas to North Carolina on July 9. On the next day, a low pressure area developed along the coast of Georgia. Soon after, the front dissipated, and by 12:00 UTC on July 10, the system developed into a tropical storm. Observations from a coastal lighthouse and a nearby ship indicated that the storm attained peak winds of 50 mph (80 km/h) while moving slowly east-northeastward, just offshore the Carolinas. The storm began weakening on July 13, and dissipated the next day when it was absorbed by a larger extratropical storm that was developing to the north.

=== Tropical Storm Barbara ===
- Tropical storm (SSHWS)
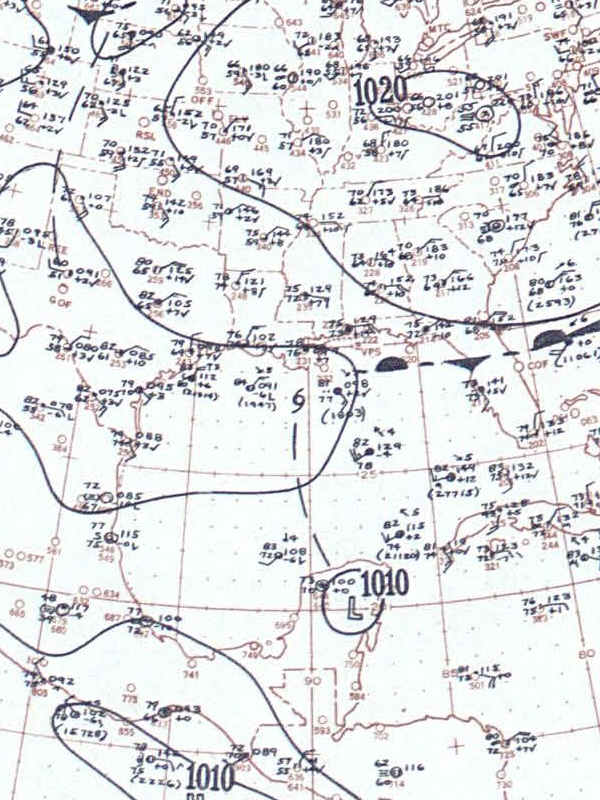
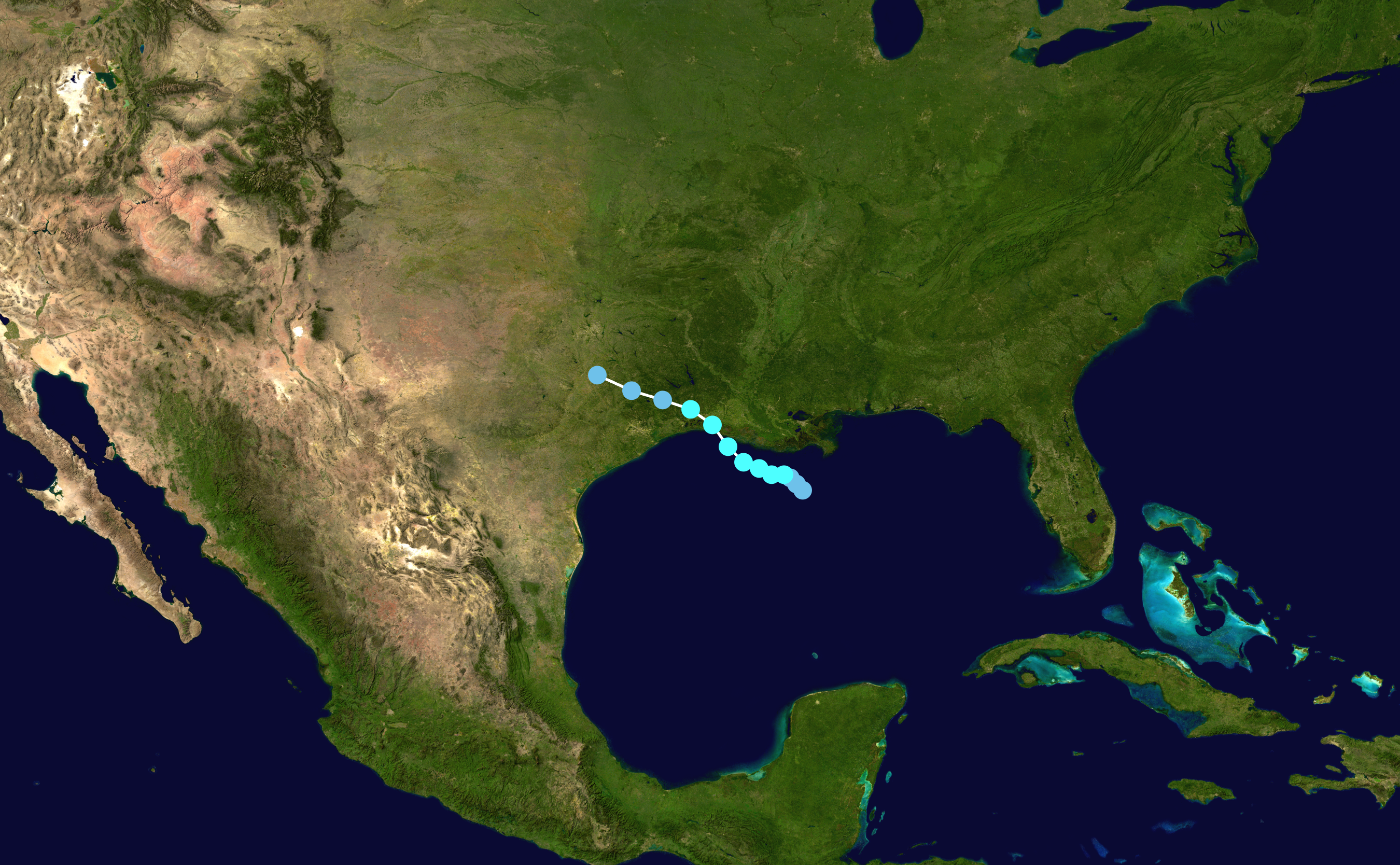
- Duration: July 27 – July 30
- Peak intensity: 60 mph (95 km/h) (1-min); 999 mbar (hPa)

On July 27, a tropical depression developed in the northern Gulf of Mexico, about 100 mi (160 km) south of Grand Isle, Louisiana. A map of the low pressure areas forming in July 1954 indicated that the system originated near the Mississippi Delta and tracked southward. After forming, the depression tracked northwestward, intensifying into Tropical Storm Barbara early on July 28. Maximum sustained winds reached 45 mph (72 km/h), although a tanker offshore named the Henry M. Dawes reported wind gusts of 60 mph (97 km/h). Officials at the United States Weather Bureau posted a storm warning from Cameron to Burrwood, Louisiana, and also advised small craft to remain at port along the entire northern Gulf Coast. Without intensifying further, Barbara made landfall near Vermilion Bay, Louisiana on July 29, dissipating the next day over Texas. The storm dropped heavy rainfall along its path, including over 2 in (51 mm) in New Orleans. The rains caused flooding as well as some damage to the rice crop. However, the Monthly Weather Review yearly summary described the precipitation as "far more beneficial than damaging". There was no wind damage.

=== Hurricane Carol ===
- Category 3 hurricane (SSHWS)
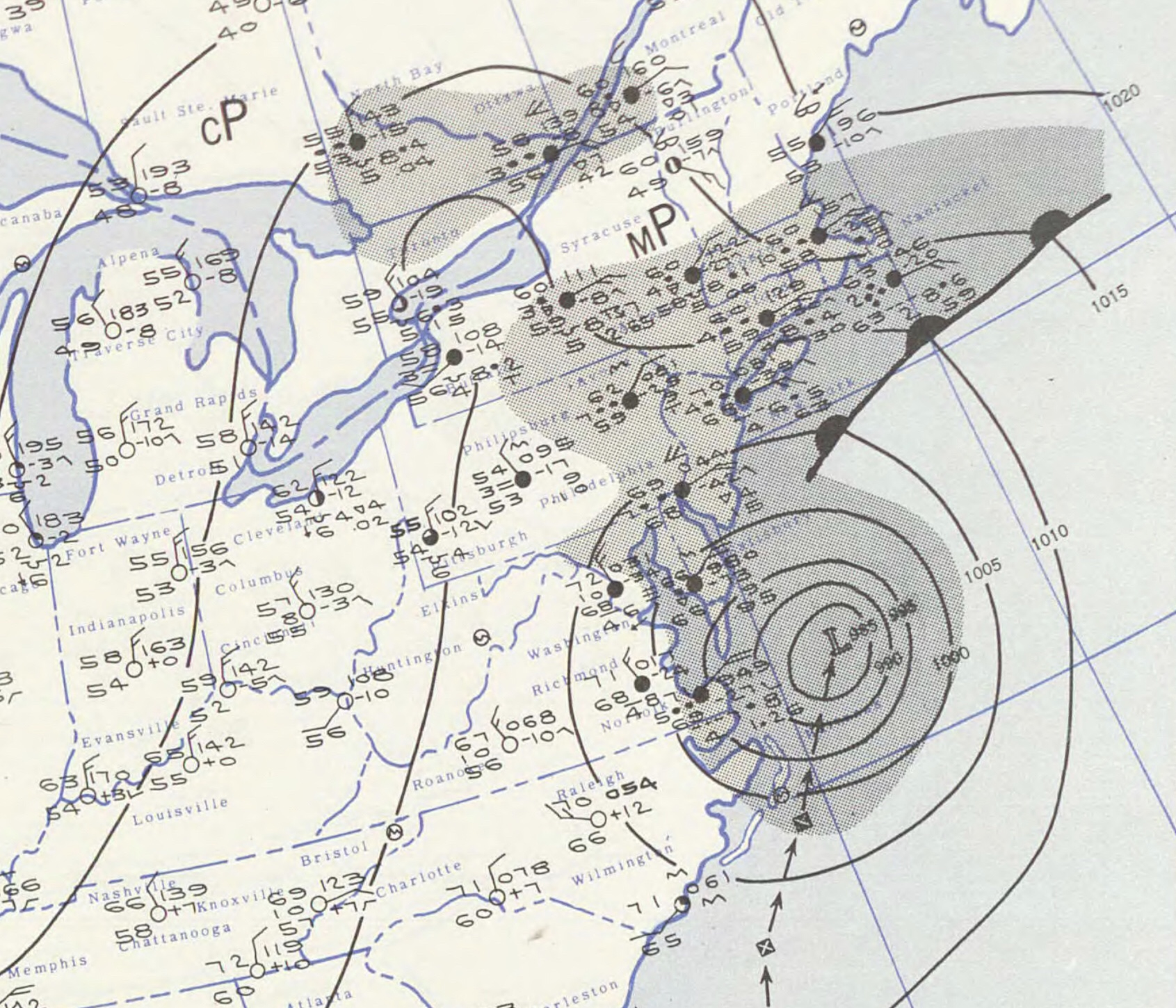
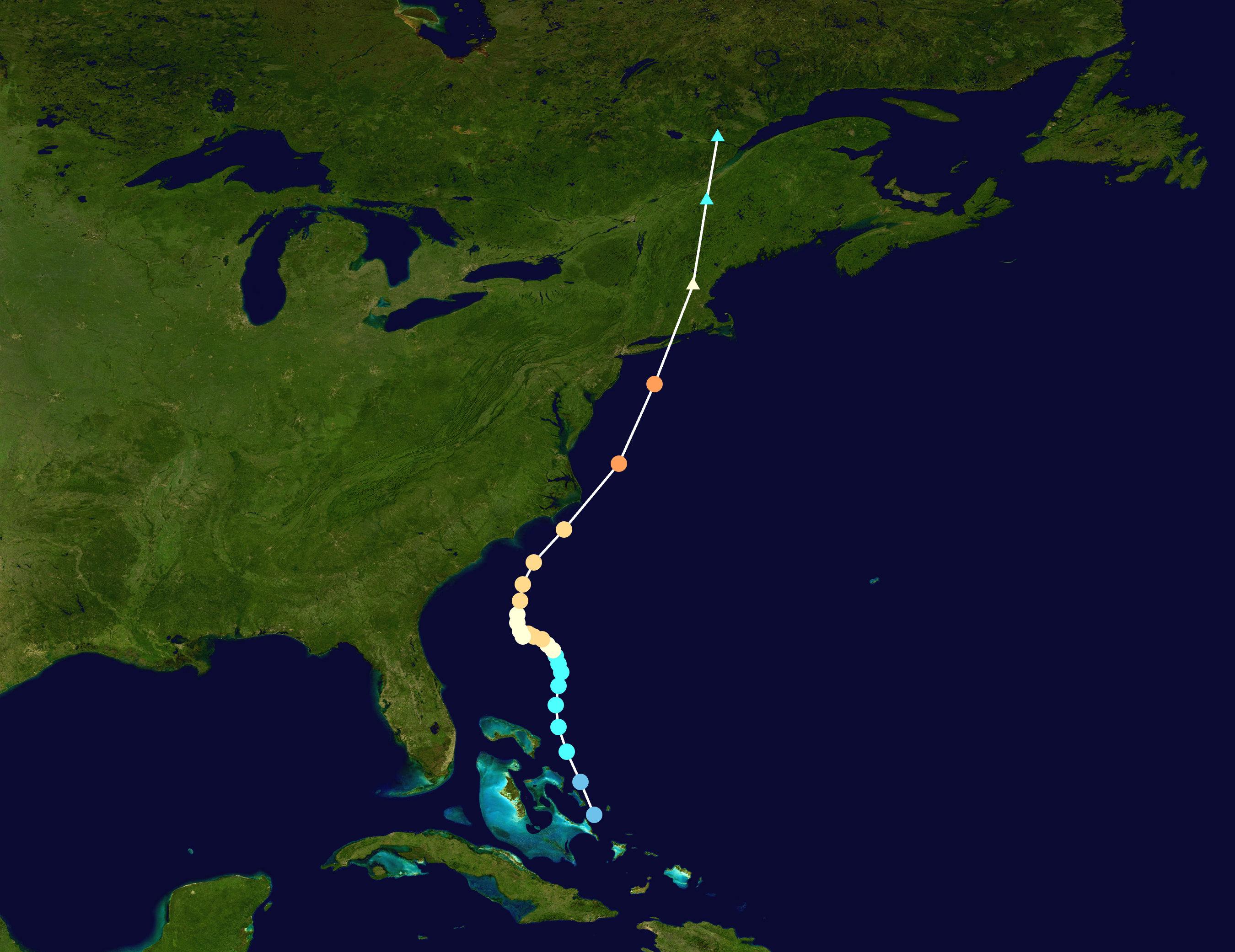
- Duration: August 25 – August 31
- Peak intensity: 115 mph (185 km/h) (1-min); 955 mbar (hPa)

Carol developed from a tropical wave near the Bahamas on August 25. It quickly intensified as it tracked generally to the north, becoming a hurricane on August 27. Moving parallel to the coastline of the southeastern United States, Carol passed just east of Cape Hatteras with winds estimated at 110 mph (180 km/h). It intensified further as it accelerated, striking eastern Long Island as Category 3 hurricane. Carol made its final landfall on Old Saybrook, Connecticut, late on August 31. Within a few hours, the hurricane became extratropical over New Hampshire, which later dissipated over Quebec.

In North Carolina, hurricane-force winds left minor damage to houses, estimated around $228,000. Rains from Carol alleviated drought conditions in the Washington, D.C. area. On Long Island, the storm surge flooded the Montauk Highway with 4 ft (1.2 m) of water about a mile across. High winds left 275,000 homes without power, and damage totaled $3 million on the island.

The hurricane moved ashore in Connecticut shortly after high tide, producing a storm surge of 10–15 ft (3.0–4.6 m) from New London eastward. The surge in Narragansett Bay reached 14.4 ft (4.4 m), which surpassed that of the 1938 New England hurricane, which flooded downtown Providence with 12 feet (3.7 m) of water. In New London, rainfall peaked around 6 in (150 mm). The hurricane produced winds of over 115 mph (185 km/h) in Connecticut and Rhode Island, including a record-high gust of 135 mph (217 km/h) at Block Island. Widespread areas were left without power from eastern Connecticut to southern Massachusetts. Further north in Maine, Hurricane Carol downed hundreds of trees, as well as destroying widespread apple groves and corn fields. It became the costliest natural disaster in the state's history, only to be surpassed by Hurricane Edna ten days later. Across New England, the hurricane destroyed about 4,000 homes, 3,500 cars, and 3,000 boats. Damage totaled $460 million, and there were 60 deaths. In neighboring Canada, high rains caused flooding while strong winds downed trees and power lines.

=== Hurricane Dolly ===
- Category 1 hurricane (SSHWS)
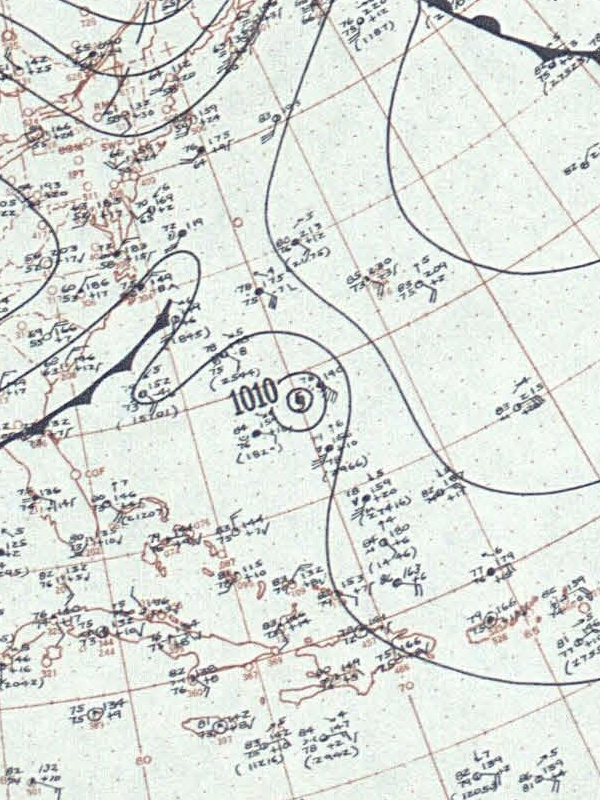
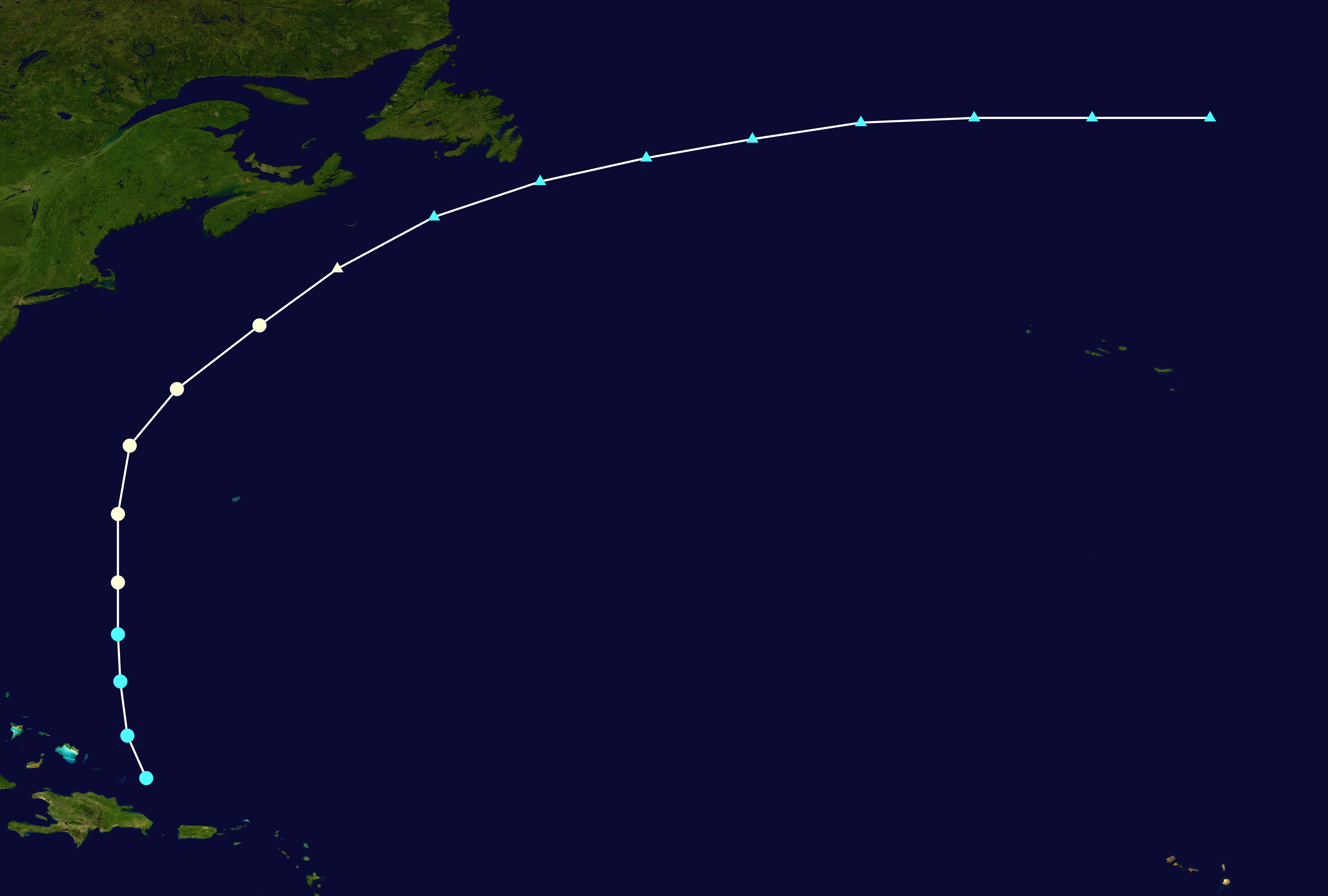
- Duration: August 31 – September 4
- Peak intensity: 85 mph (140 km/h) (1-min); ≤994 mbar (hPa)

A tropical wave spawned a tropical depression on August 31 to the northwest of Puerto Rico. It moved rapidly north-northwestward, intensifying into Tropical Storm Dolly later that day and into a hurricane early on September 1. Early in the storm's duration, the U.S. Weather Bureau noted the potential for Dolly to affect the same areas of New England that Hurricane Carol struck just days prior. However, the hurricane turned to the north away from land. The Hurricane Hunters estimated maximum sustained winds of 85 mph (137 km/h) on September 2 after the storm passed about halfway between the Outer Banks and Bermuda. Dolly turned to the northeast on September 2 and became extratropical later that day to the south of Nova Scotia. It was tracked until September 4, until it was last located to the north of the Azores. There was no reported damage.

=== Hurricane Edna ===
- Category 3 hurricane (SSHWS)
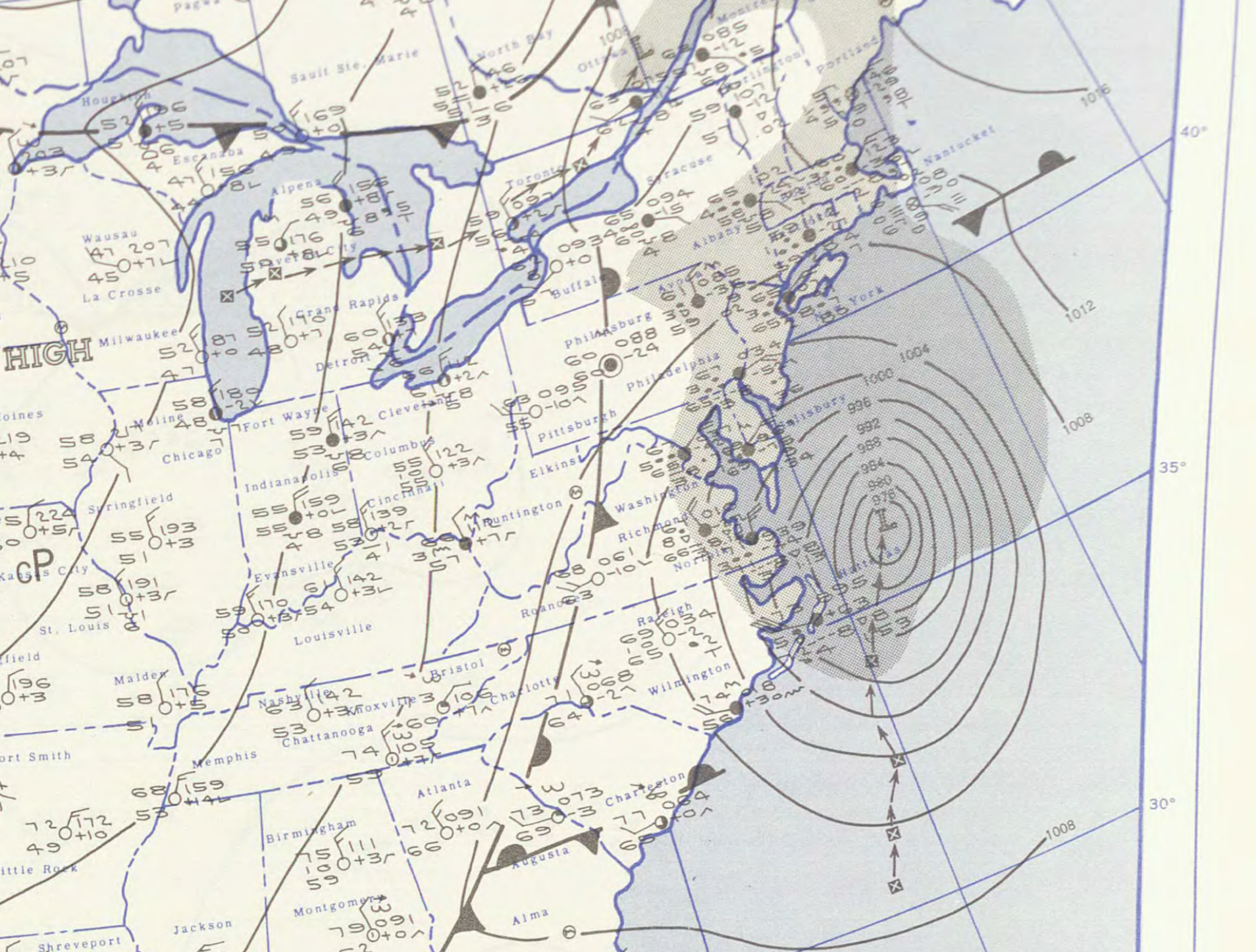
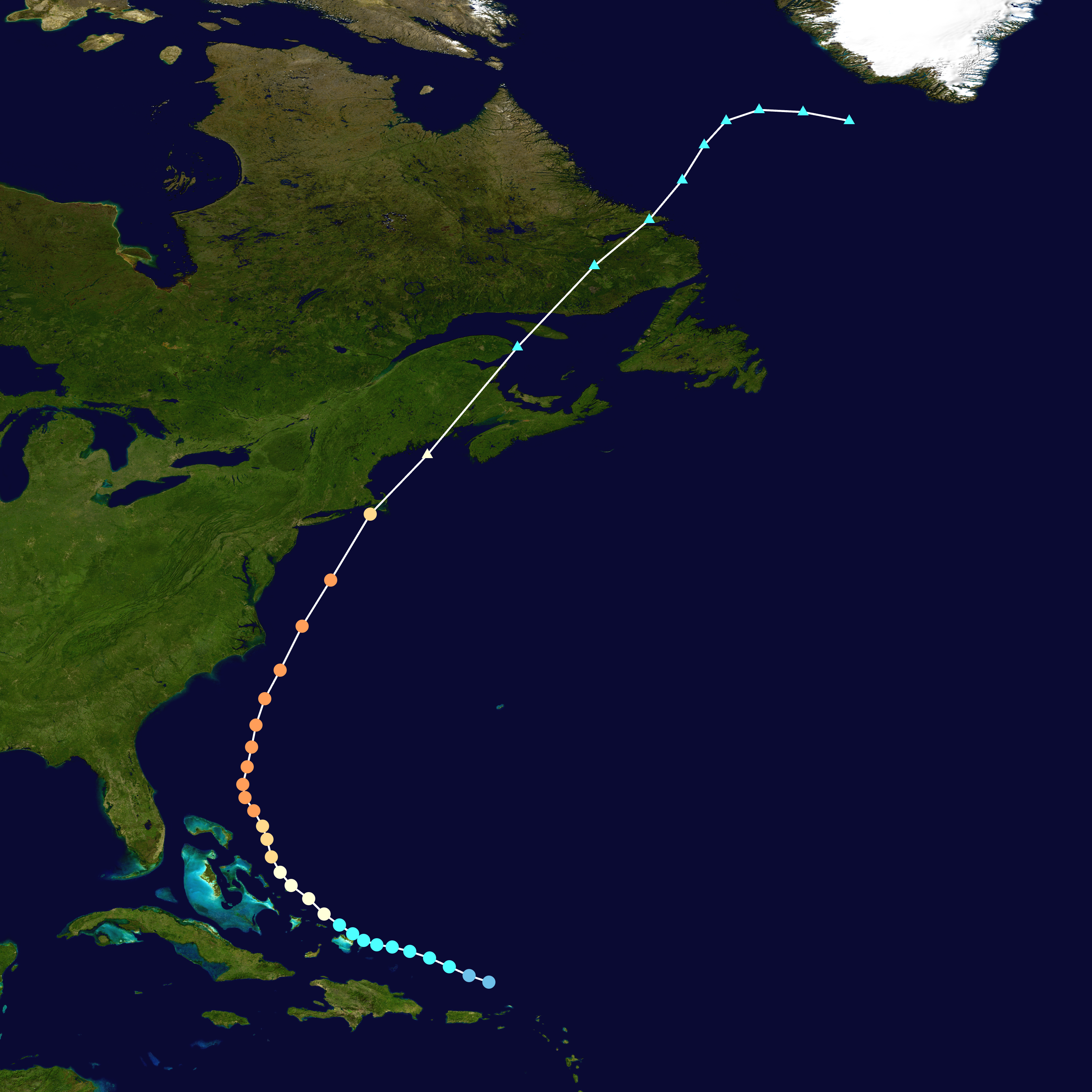
- Duration: September 5 – September 14
- Peak intensity: 125 mph (205 km/h) (1-min); 943 mbar (hPa)

As Dolly became extratropical, the tropical depression that later became Hurricane Edna developed east of the Lesser Antilles on September 2. It moved northwestward, dropping heavy rainfall on Puerto Rico as it passed north of the island. On September 7 Edna became a hurricane, and the next day reached peak winds of 120 mph (190 km/h). It turned to the north and northeast, bypassing the Outer Banks and skirting Cape Cod. On September 11, Edna struck Massachusetts as a strong Category 2 hurricane. The hurricane later moved ashore near the border between Maine and New Brunswick around the time it became extratropical. The remnants persisted a few more days before dissipating south of Greenland.

Early in its duration, Edna produced high seas and gale-force winds in the Bahamas, but there was no damage there. Hurricane-force winds occurred in the Outer Banks, although damage was minor. As it passed New England, Edna produced a 6 ft (1.8 m) storm surge during a high tide, which caused severe flooding in Martha's Vineyard, Nantucket, and Cape Cod. Wind gusts peaked at 120 mph (190 km/h) on Martha's Vineyard, and the strong winds across the region left widespread power outages. The hurricane dropped additional heavy rainfall to areas affected by Carol, resulting in flooding in Massachusetts and Rhode Island. In Long Island and New England, the hurricane left over $42 million in damage and 20 deaths, only 11 days after Carol affected the same area. About a third of the damage occurred in Maine, becoming the costliest hurricane on record in the state. Hurricane-force winds extended into Canada, causing $6 million in damage (1954 CAD), mostly from crop damage. There was one death in Nova Scotia.

=== Tropical Storm Nine ===
- Tropical storm (SSHWS)
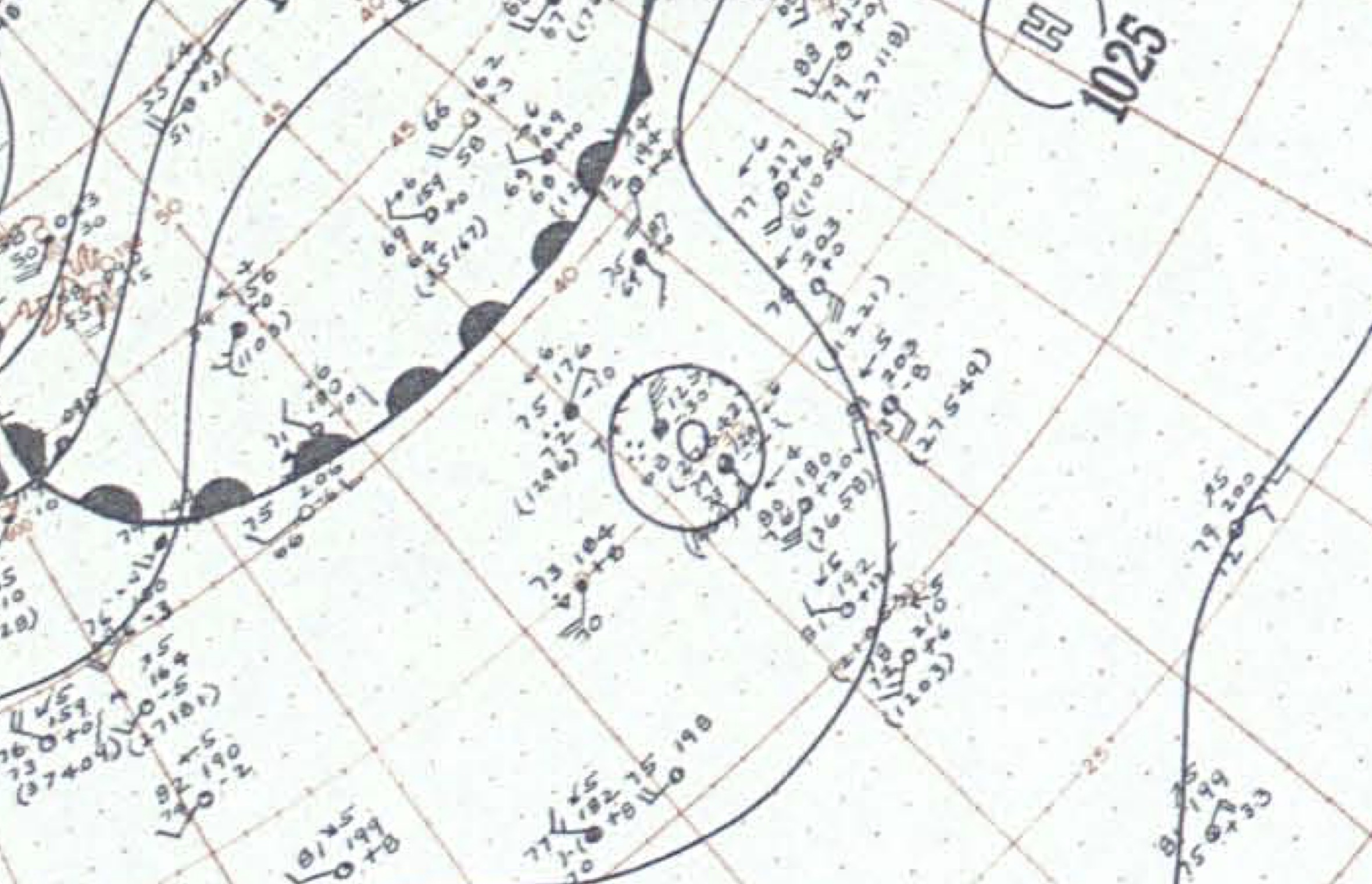
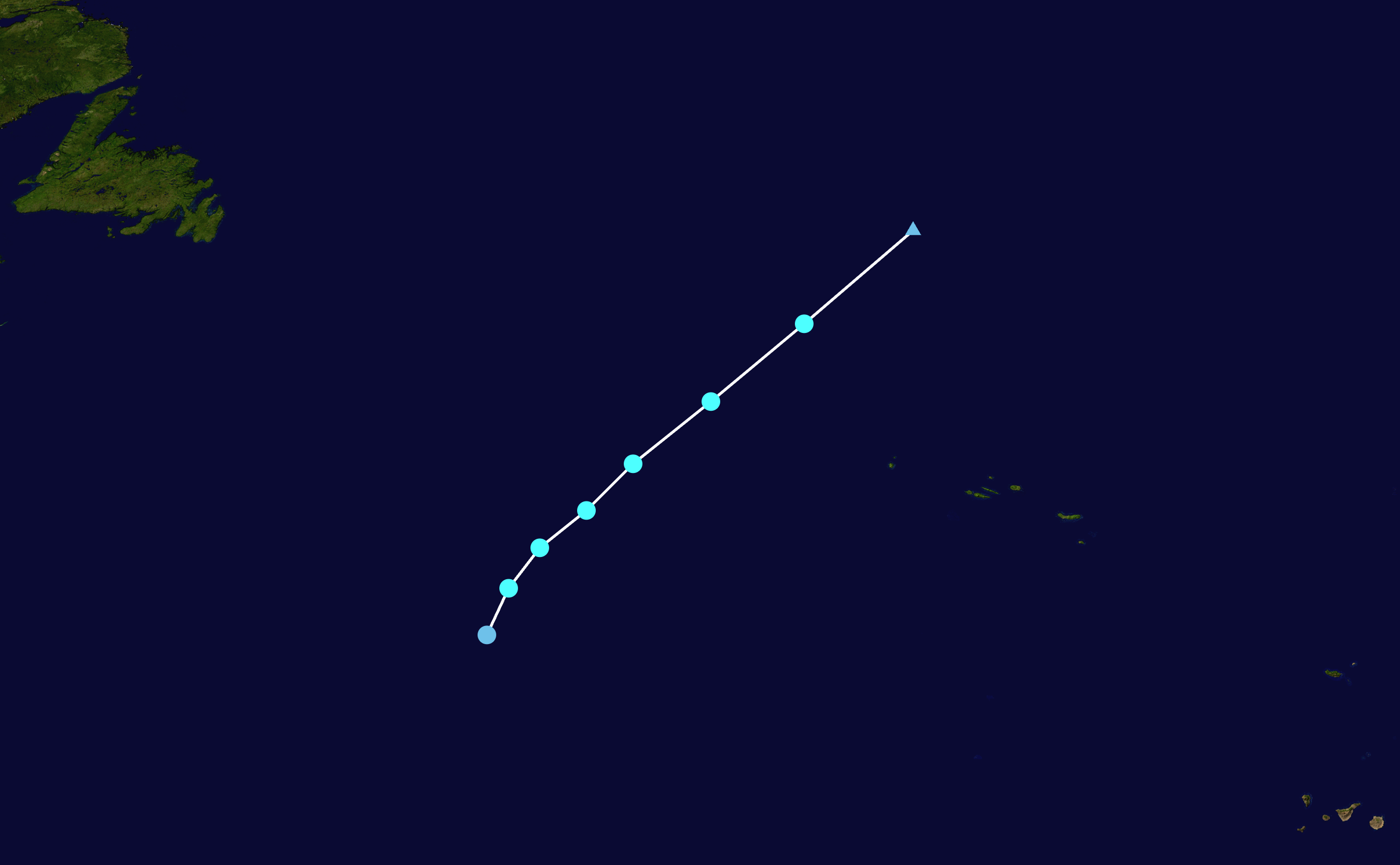
- Duration: September 6 – September 8
- Peak intensity: 45 mph (75 km/h) (1-min); 1004 mbar (hPa)

A surface trough persisted across the central Atlantic Ocean on September 2. Over the next few days, the system moved slowly northeastward, independent of any frontal systems. On September 6, nearby ships indicated that the a closed circulation had developed, marking the genesis of the system as a tropical depression. Accelerating to the northeast, the storm reached peak winds of 45 mph (72 km/h) on September 7. By the next day, the system became extratropical, and soon after was absorbed by a larger extratropical storm to the north.

=== Tropical Storm Florence ===
- Tropical storm (SSHWS)
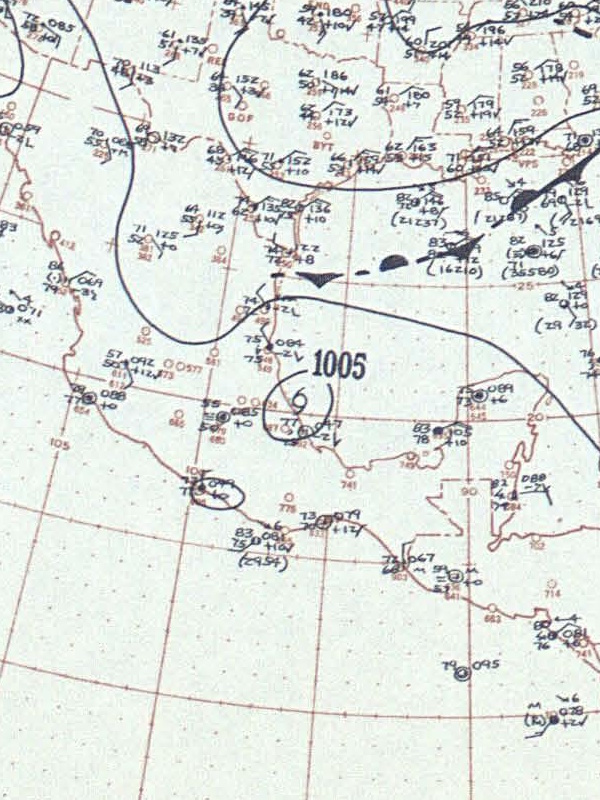
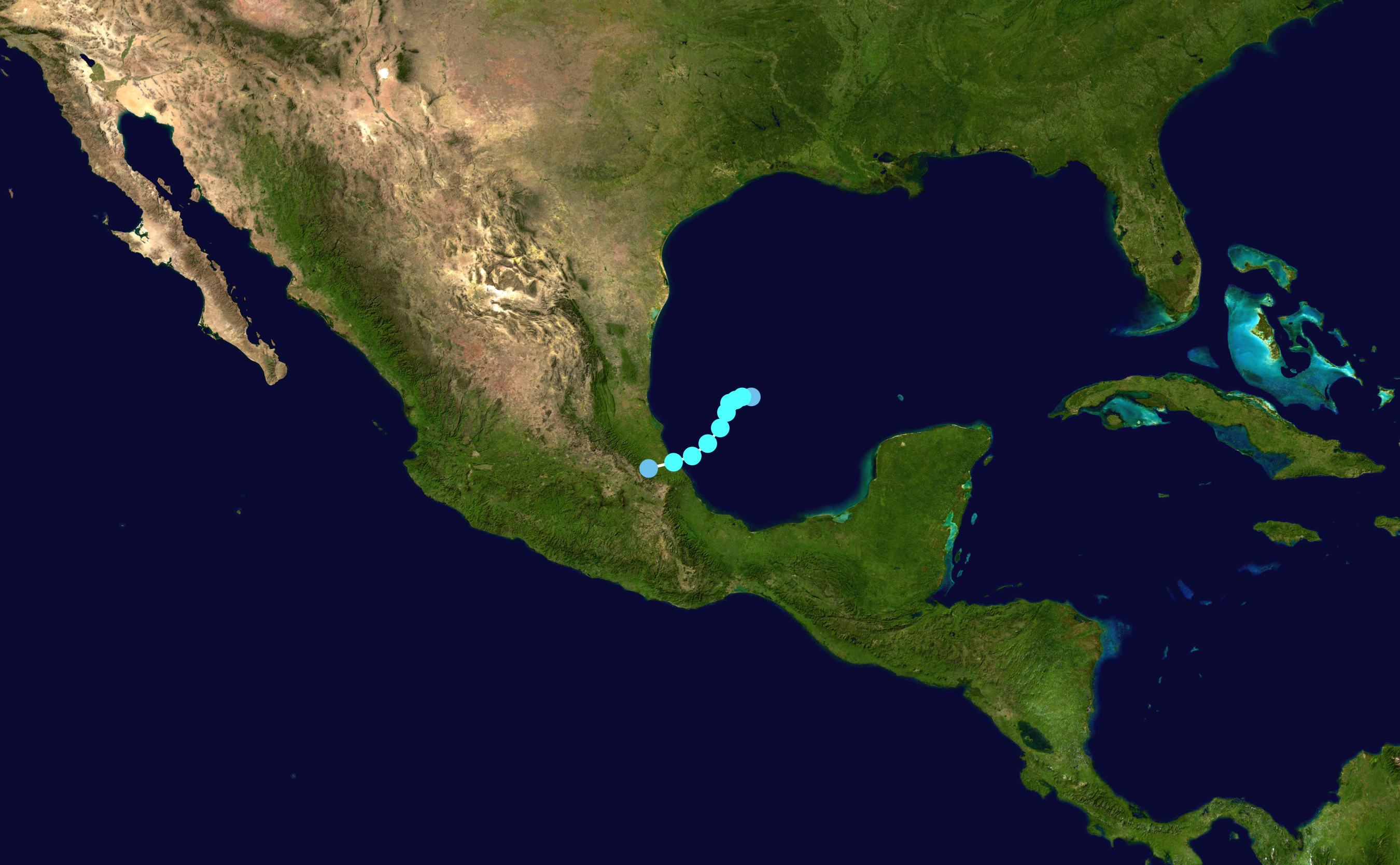
- Duration: September 11 – September 12
- Peak intensity: 65 mph (100 km/h) (1-min); ≤1001 mbar (hPa)

A tropical storm formed in the Bay of Campeche on September 11. Given the name Florence, the storm moved generally west-southwestward with a small radius of maximum winds. Hurricane Hunters reported winds of 65 mph (105 km/h), although winds were initially (before reanalysis confirmed it was a tropical storm) estimated to have reached minimal hurricane force, or 75 mph (121 km/h). Before the storm moved ashore, officials in Veracruz evacuated residents from low-lying areas, and overall about 90,000 people left their homes. On September 12, Florence moved ashore between Tuxpan, and Nautla, Veracruz and quickly dissipated. The hurricane flooded coastal cities with up to 3 ft (0.91 m) of water, cutting off communications throughout the state. Damage was heaviest around Poza Rica, primarily from the destruction of banana plantations. Monetary damage was estimated around $1.5 million, and there were five reported deaths.

=== Tropical Storm Eleven ===
- Tropical storm (SSHWS)
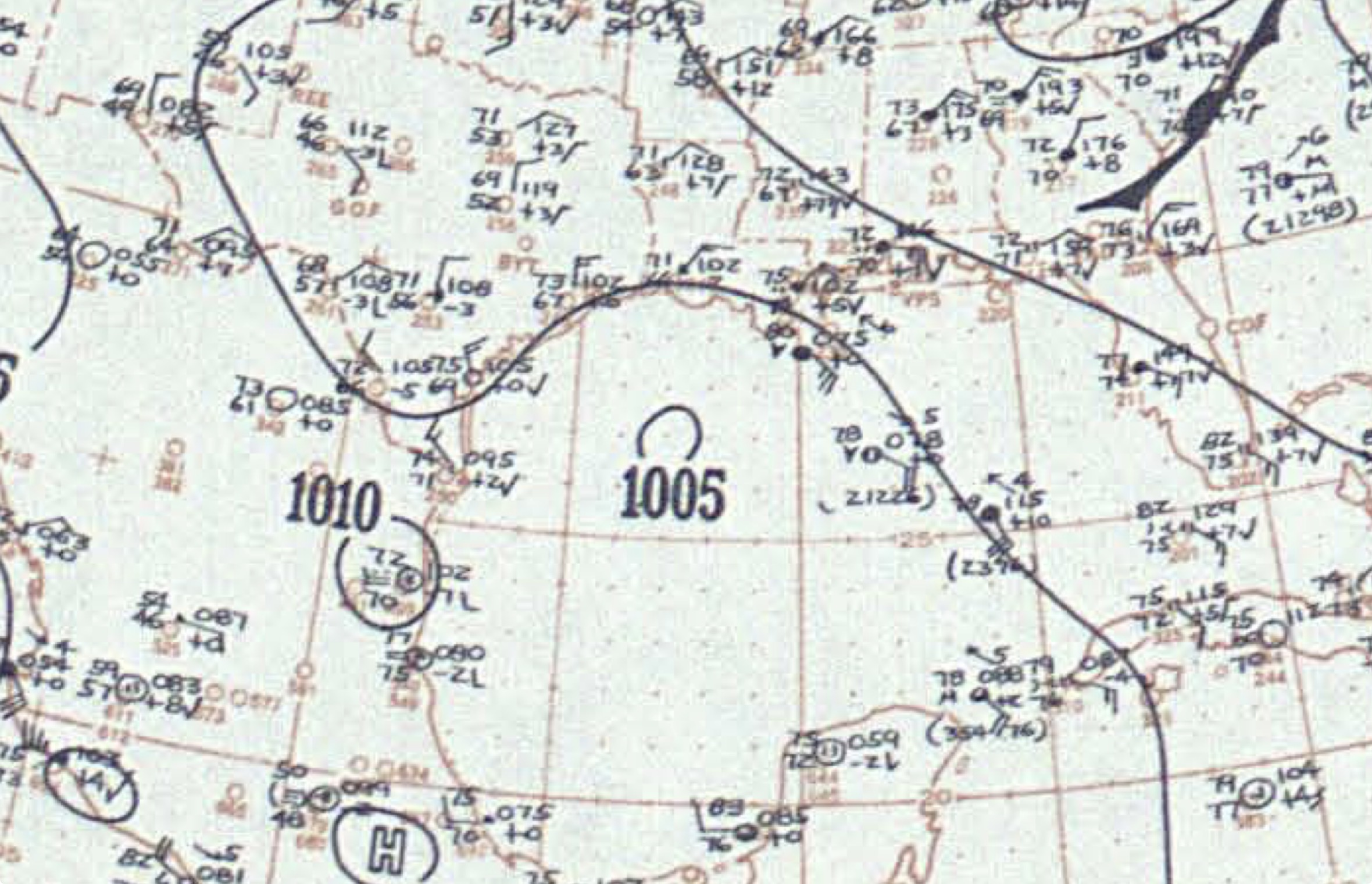
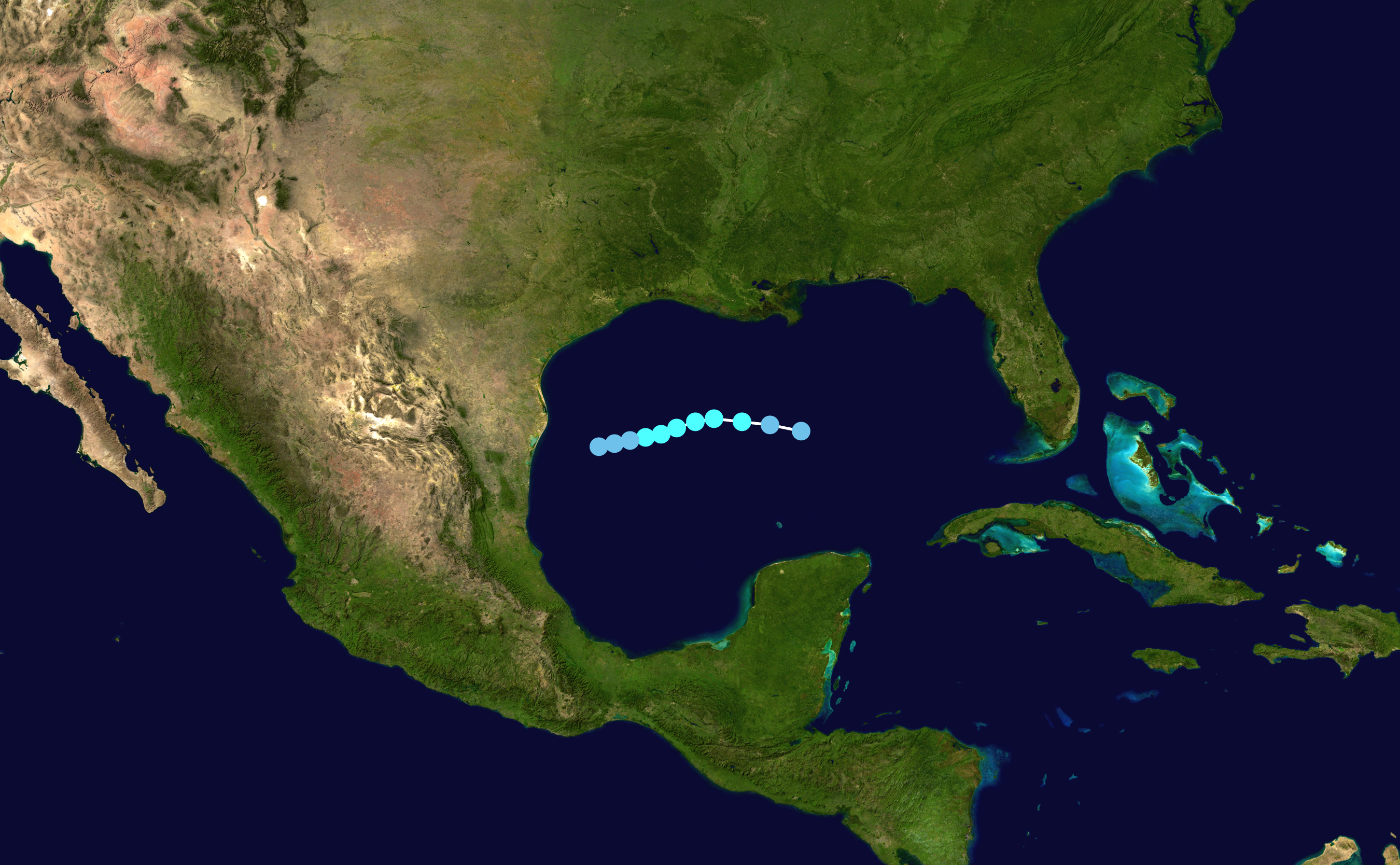
- Duration: September 15 – September 18
- Peak intensity: 45 mph (75 km/h) (1-min); 1004 mbar (hPa)

A low pressure area was present north of the Yucatán Peninsula on September 14. Nearby ship observations indicated that a tropical depression developed the next day in the central Gulf of Mexico, although the system's large structure meant it could have been a subtropical cyclone. The system moved slowly westward, bringing winds of 30 mph (48 km/h) to the coast of Louisiana. It is estimated that the storm reached peak winds of 45 mph (72 km/h) on September 16, based on reports from ships and the Hurricane Hunters. On the next day, the system began weakening over water, dissipating on September 18 without moving ashore.

=== Tropical Storm Gilda ===
- Tropical storm (SSHWS)
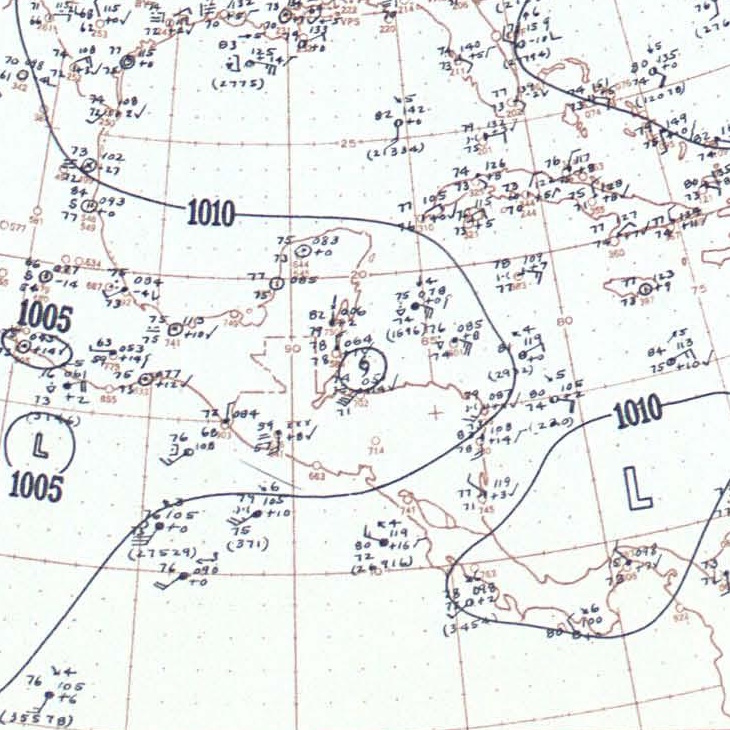
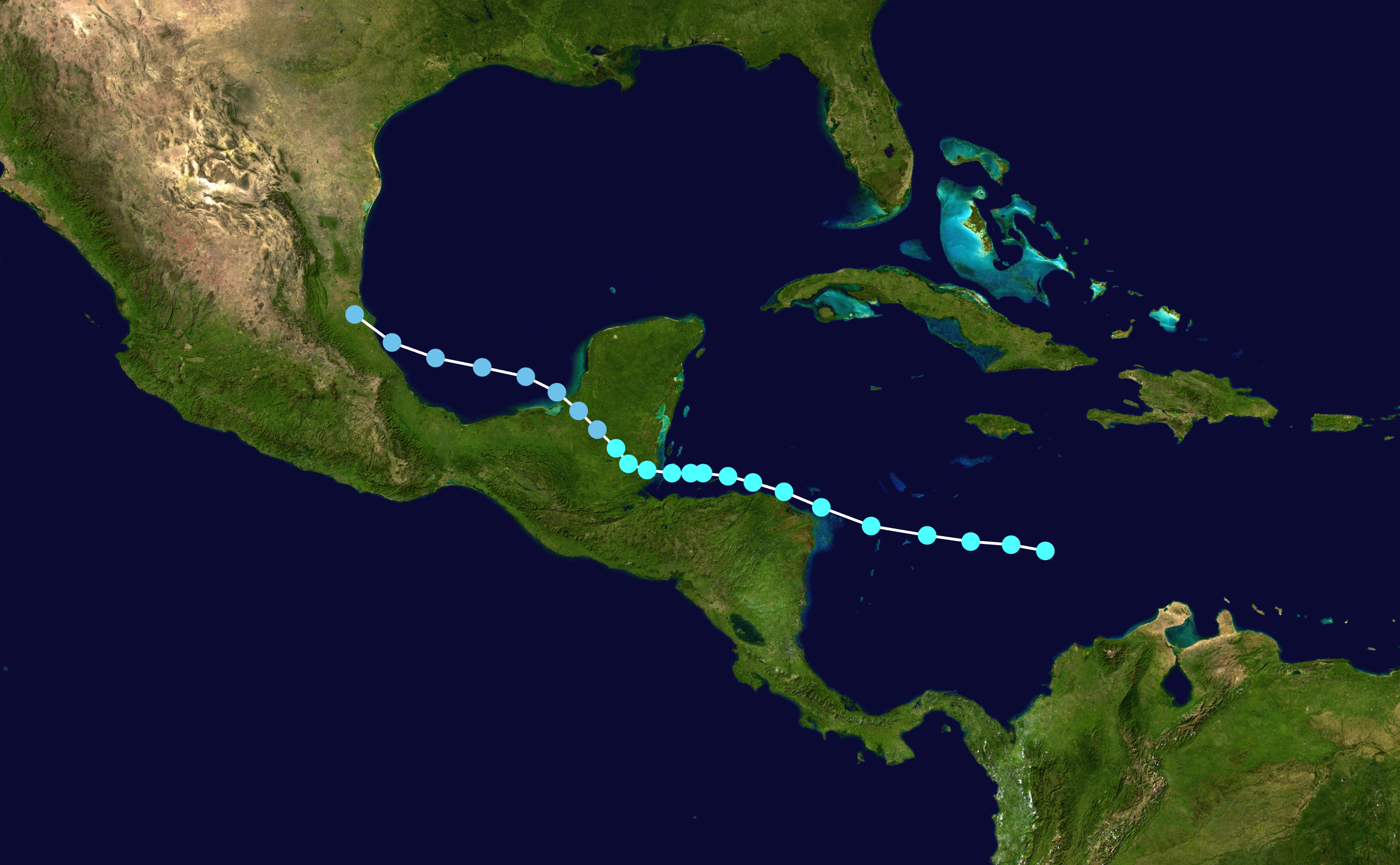
- Duration: September 24 – September 27
- Peak intensity: 70 mph (110 km/h) (1-min); 998 mbar (hPa)

On September 24, Tropical Storm Gilda developed in the central Caribbean Sea about halfway between Jamaica and Colombia. A small storm, it moved westward throughout its duration. On September 26, Gilda attained peak winds of 70 mph (110 km/h) while nearing northeastern Honduras. The storm paralleled the coastline a short distance offshore, maintaining its intensity before hitting and later weakening over Belize on September 27. It re-emerged in the Gulf of Mexico before making another landfall near Tampico as a tropical depression on September 29, dissipating the next day.

While moving just offshore the coast of Honduras, Gilda dropped intense rainfall, which flooding about 680 mi^{2} (1,800 km^{2}) of land along the Chamelecón and Ulúa rivers. The waters caused the widespread destruction of banana plantations and houses, leaving about 3,000 people homeless. The United Fruit Company reacted to this destruction by firing 10,000 of its about 100,000 workers within Honduras. Honduras's then-President Juan Manuel Gálvez appealed for aid from the United States. In response, U.S. Air Force planes flew food, medicine, rafts, and water purification tablets to the most-affected regions. A total of 29 people were killed in Honduras. When Gilda made its landfall in Belize, it left little property damage and no deaths.

=== Unnamed hurricane ===
- Category 2 hurricane (SSHWS)
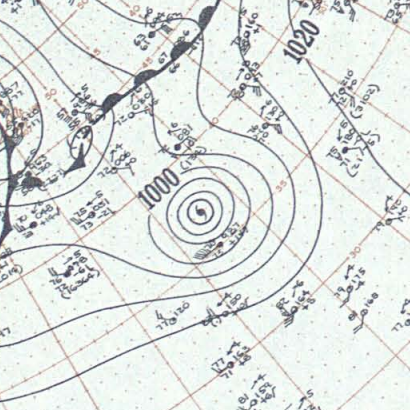
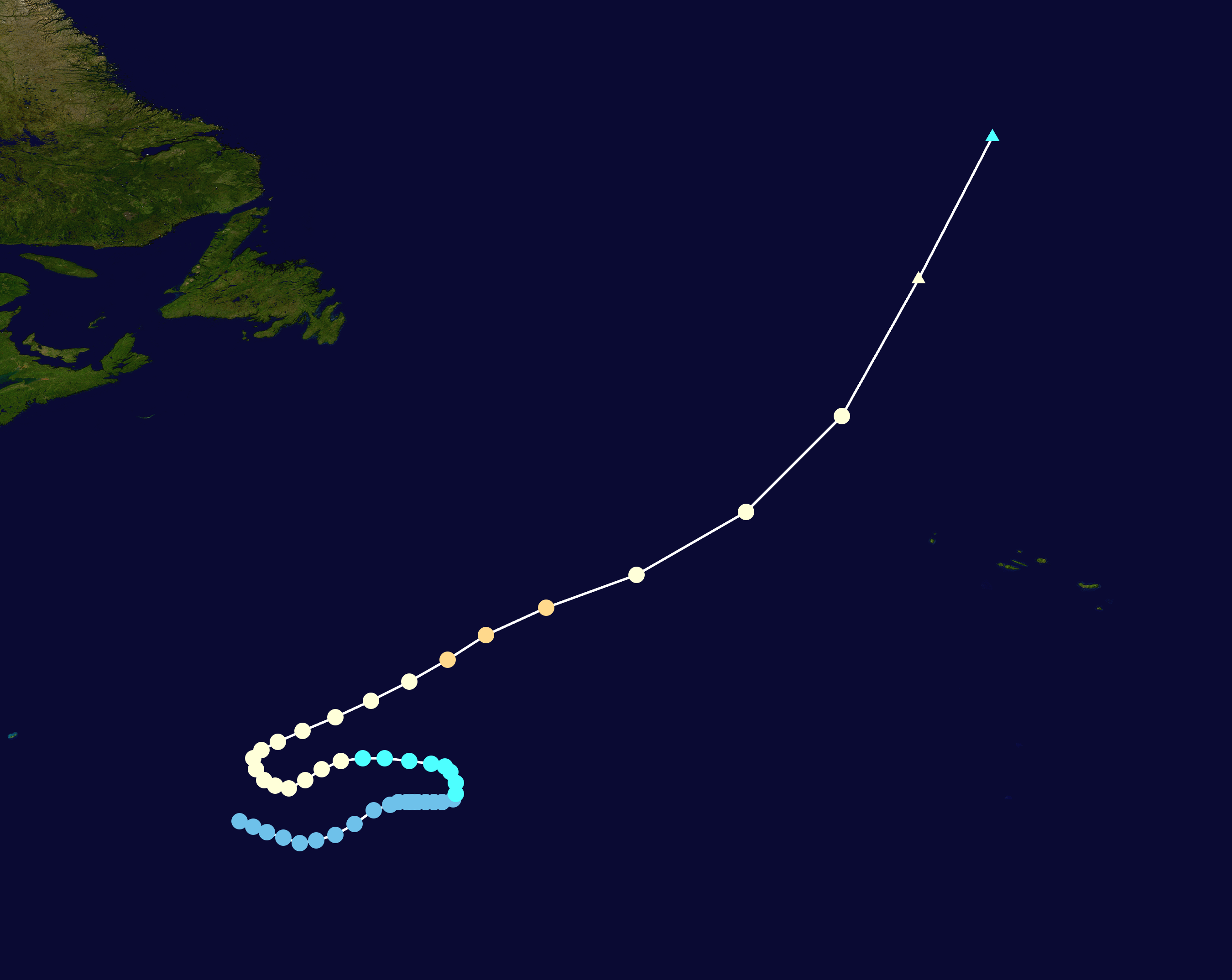
- Duration: September 25 – October 6
- Peak intensity: 100 mph (155 km/h) (1-min); ≤964 mbar (hPa)

A tropical depression formed in the Central Atlantic on September 25. It drifted east-northeastward, eventually becoming a tropical storm on September 29. The storm curved to the west and west-southwest, becoming a hurricane on October 2. It turned to the northeast on October 3, and reached a peak of 100 mph (160 km/h) winds about halfway between Bermuda and the Azores. By that point it began accelerating, and late on October 6 the hurricane became extratropical over the Northeastern Atlantic. Early the next day it was last observed to the south of Iceland. The hurricane was not named due to its presence in the eastern Atlantic and not being a threat to land.

=== Hurricane Hazel ===
- Category 4 hurricane (SSHWS)
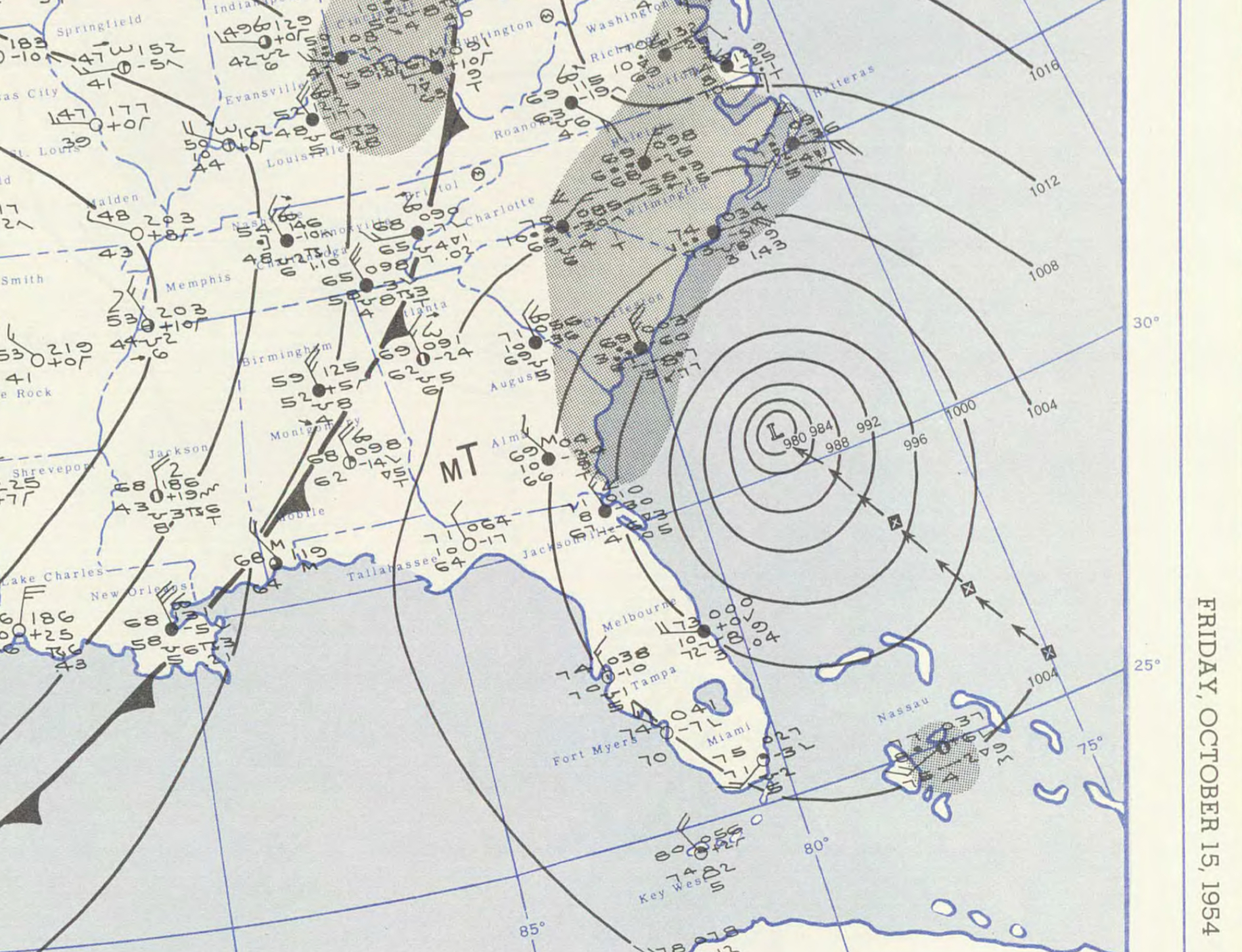
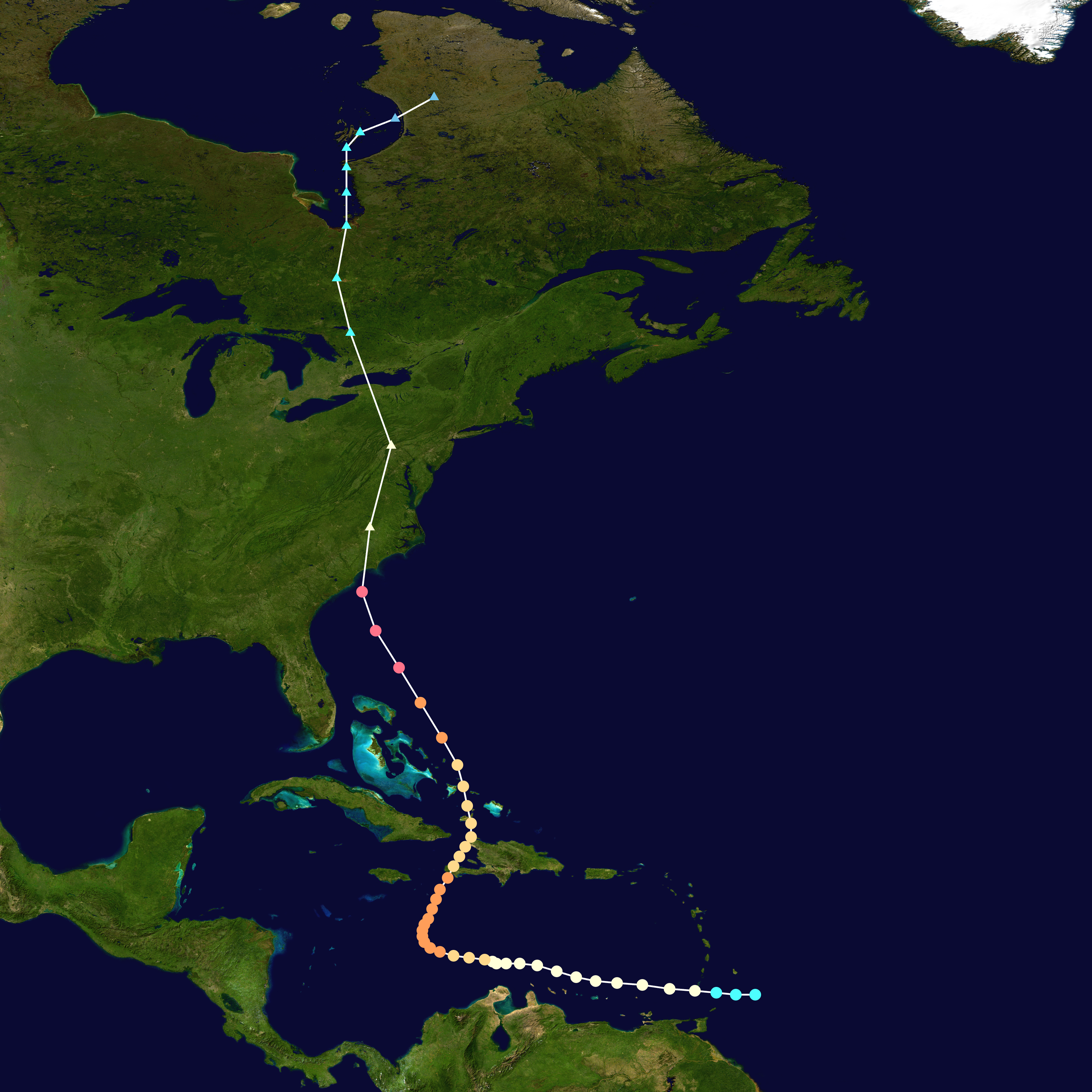
- Duration: October 5 – October 18
- Peak intensity: 130 mph (215 km/h) (1-min); 938 mbar (hPa)

Hurricane Hazel was the deadliest and second costliest hurricane of the season. The storm killed as many as 1,000 people in Haiti before striking the United States near the border between North and South Carolina, as a Category 4 hurricane. After causing 95 fatalities in the U.S., Hazel struck Canada as an extratropical storm, raising the death toll by 81 people, mostly in Toronto.

Hazel formed on October 5 just east of the Windward Islands and intensified into a Category 1 hurricane while crossing the southeastern Caribbean Sea. After making a hard turn northward, it rapidly intensified as it approached Haiti, reaching Category 3 intensity before landfall. In Haiti, Hazel destroyed 40% of the coffee trees and 50% of the cacao crop, affecting the economy for several years to come. It fluctuated in intensity before making landfall as a Category 4 hurricane in the Carolinas, which destroyed most waterfront dwellings near its point of impact. It affected several more states, including Delaware, Maryland, New Jersey, New York, Pennsylvania, Virginia, and West Virginia, bringing gusts near 100 mph (160 km/h) and causing $308 million in damage.

When Hazel arrived in Ontario, rivers and streams passing through the Greater Toronto Area overflowed their banks, causing severe flooding. As a result, many residential areas located in floodplains, such as the Raymore Drive area, were subsequently converted to parkland. In Canada alone, over C$135 million (2009: $1.1 billion) of damage was incurred. Hazel was particularly destructive in Toronto, as a result of a combination of a lack of experience in dealing with tropical storms and the storm's unexpected retention of power. Hazel had traveled 680 mi (1,090 km) over land, but while approaching Canada, it had merged with an existing powerful cold front. The storm stalled over the Greater Toronto Area, and although it was now extratropical, it remained as powerful as a category 1 hurricane. To help with the cleanup, 800 members of the military were summoned, and a Hurricane Relief Fund was established that distributed $5.1 million (2023: $56.2 million) in aid.

=== Tropical Storm Fifteen ===
- Tropical storm (SSHWS)
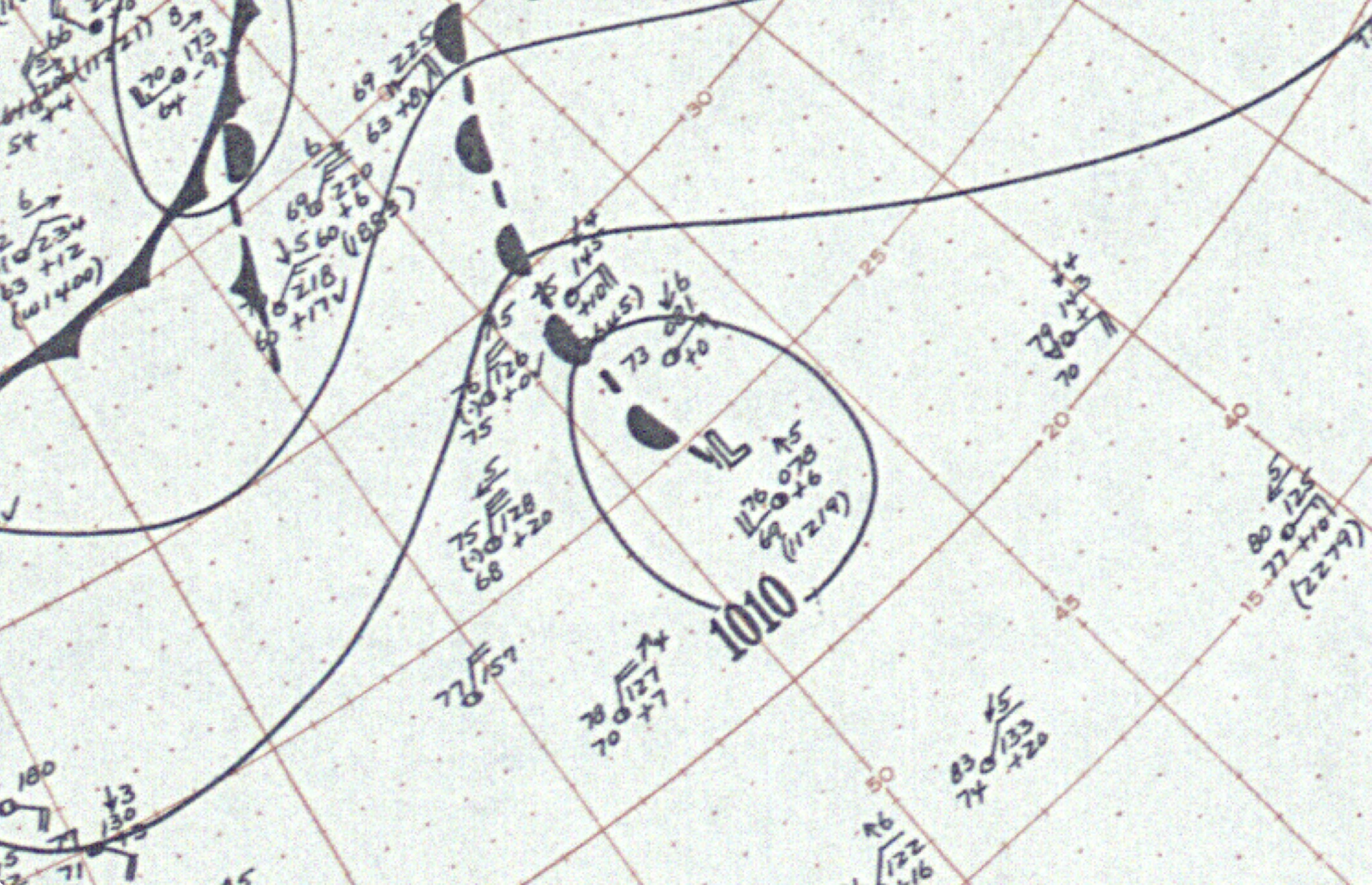
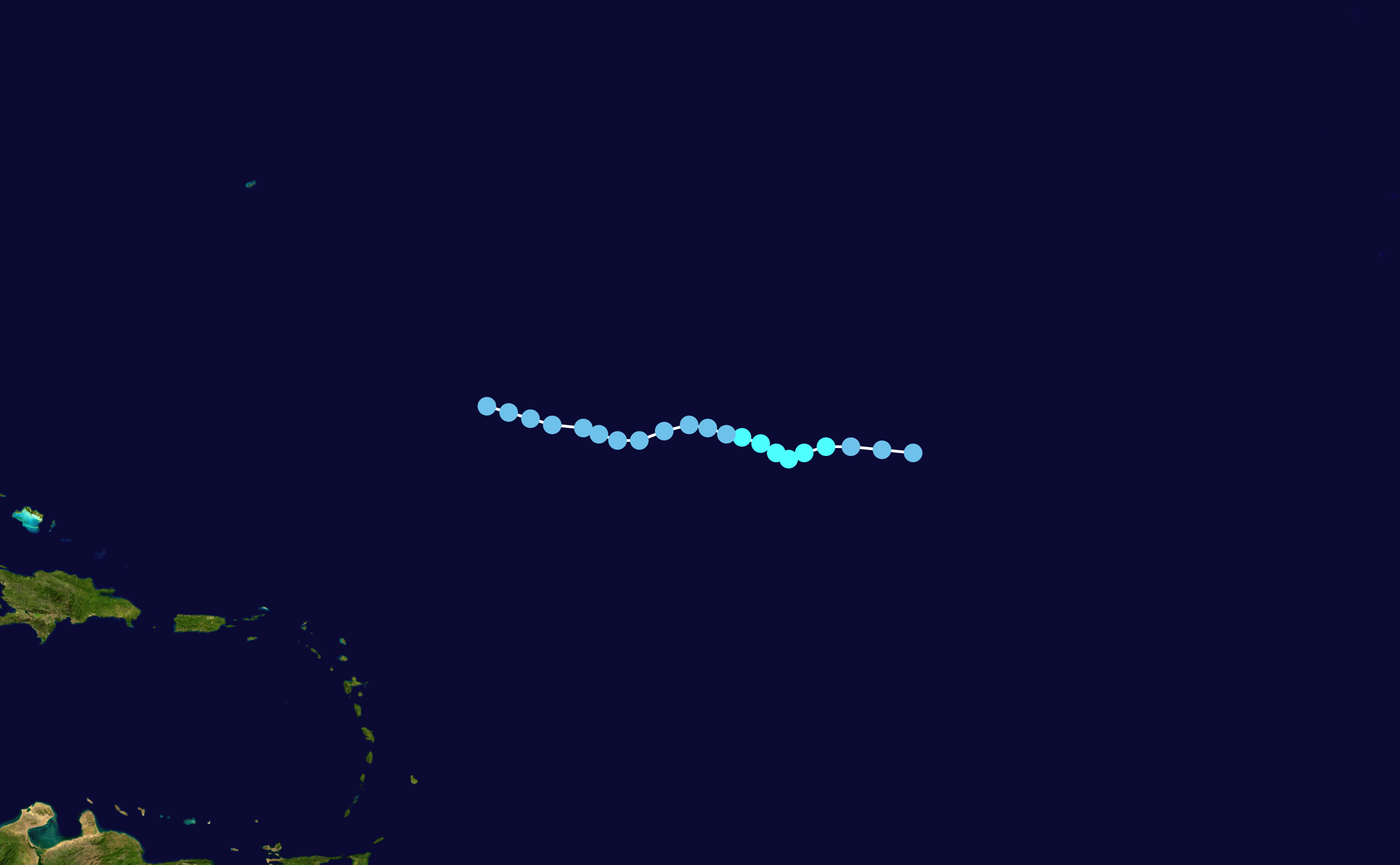
- Duration: November 16 – November 21
- Peak intensity: 40 mph (65 km/h) (1-min); 1005 mbar (hPa)

On November 16, a tropical depression developed about halfway between the Lesser Antilles and the Azores. It moved to the west, intensifying into a tropical storm and reaching peak winds of 40 mph (64 km/h) (however, due to limited data, it is possible that the storm remained a tropical depression). The storm maintained that intensity on November 21 when it began weakening, dissipating later that day.

=== Hurricane Alice (December) ===
- Category 1 hurricane (SSHWS)
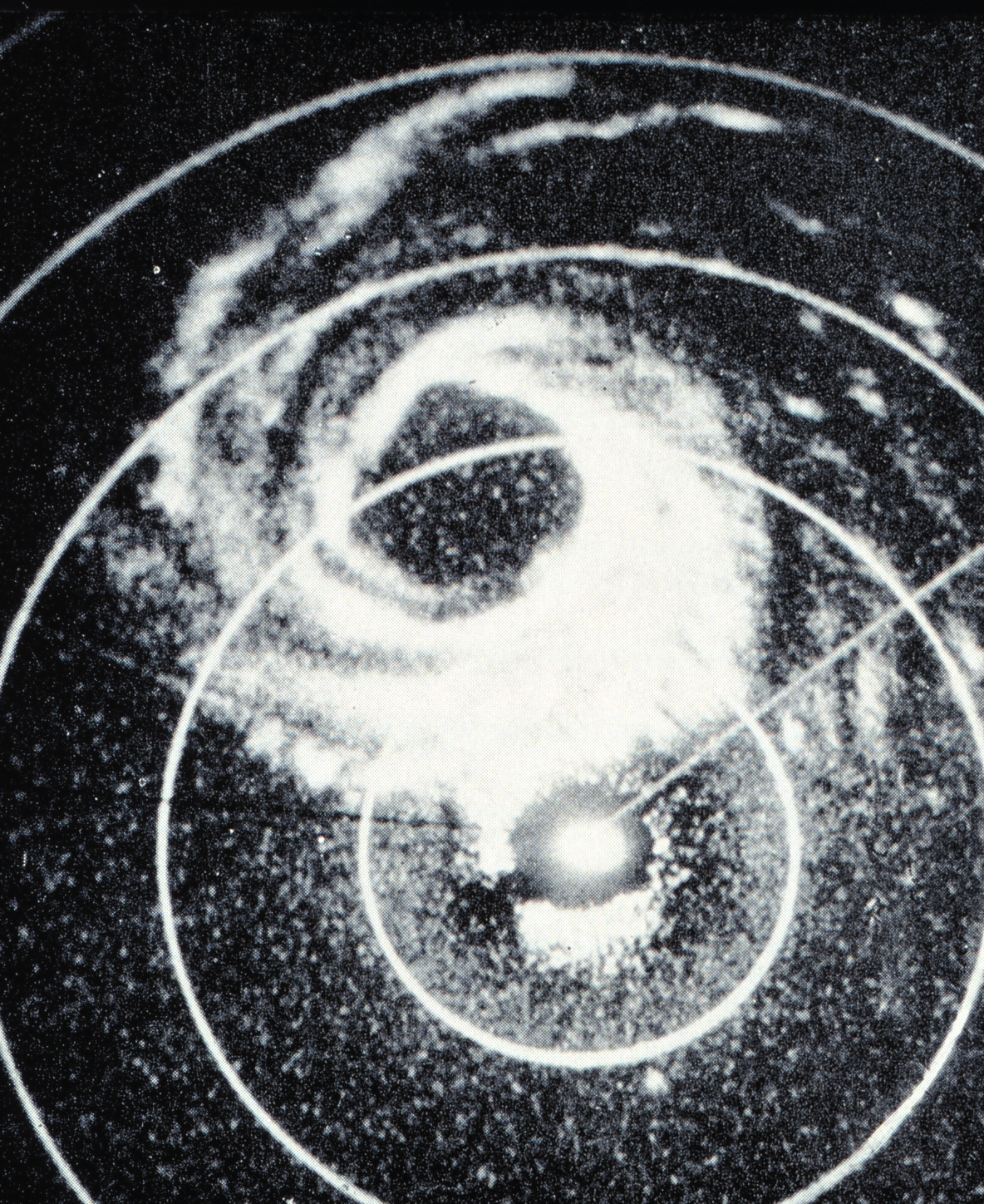
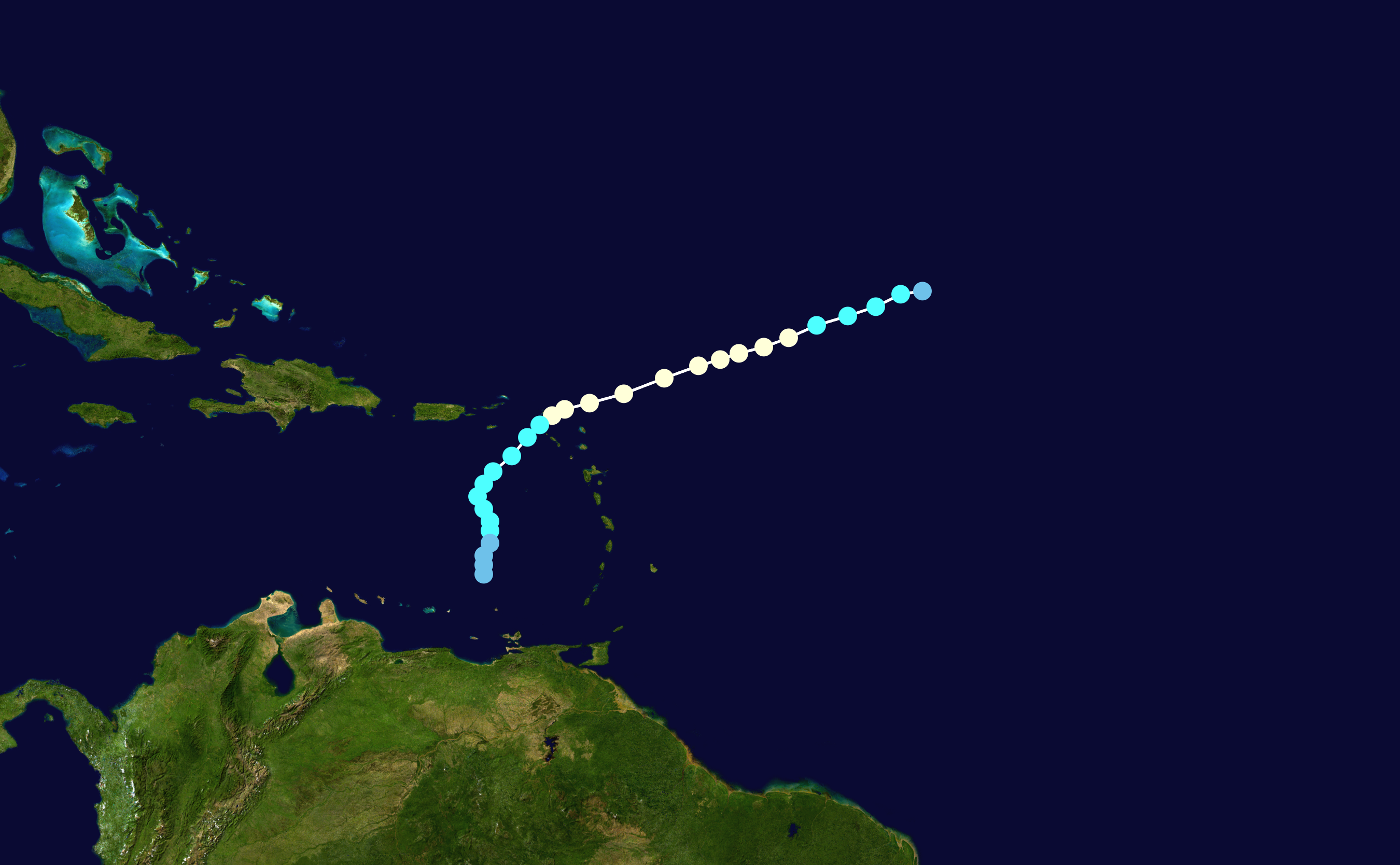
- Duration: December 30 – January 6
- Peak intensity: 90 mph (150 km/h) (1-min); 980 mbar (hPa)

The final storm of the season, Alice, developed on December 30 from a trough of low pressure in the central Atlantic Ocean in an area of unusually favorable conditions. The storm moved southwestward and gradually strengthened to reach hurricane status. It persisted into the following calendar year, passing through the Leeward Islands on January 2. Alice reached peak winds of 90 mph (140 km/h) before encountering cold air and turning to the southeast. It dissipated on January 6 over the southeastern Caribbean Sea.

Alice produced heavy rainfall and moderately strong winds across several islands along its path. Saba and Anguilla were affected the most, with total damage amounting to $623,500 (1955 USD). Operationally, lack of definitive data prevented the U.S. Weather Bureau from declaring the system a hurricane until January 2. It received the name Alice in early 1955, though re-analysis of the data supported extending its track to the previous year, resulting in two tropical cyclones of the same name in one season. It was one of only two storms to span two calendar years, along with Tropical Storm Zeta in 2005–06.

=== Other system ===
- Tropical depression (SSHWS)
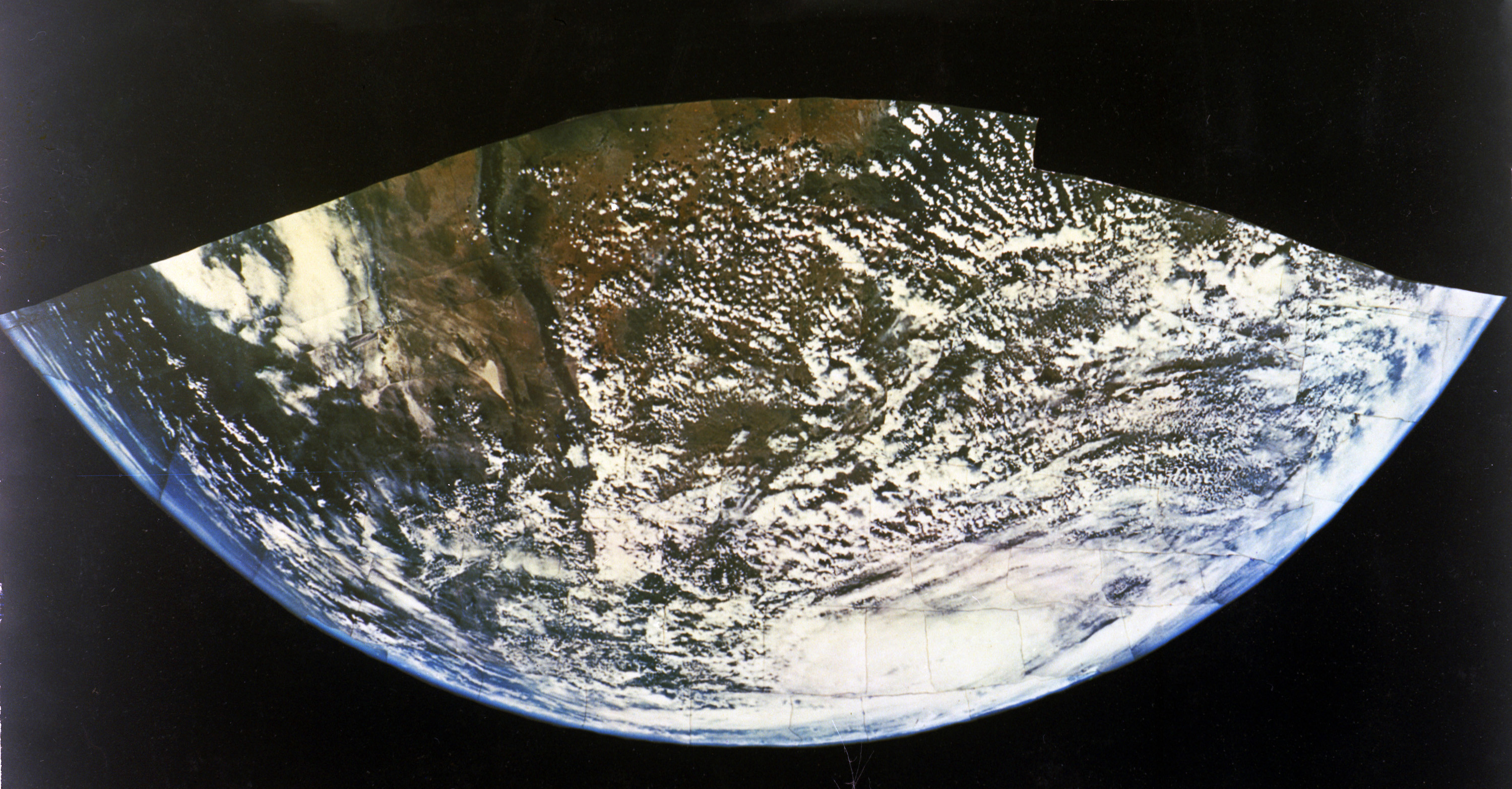
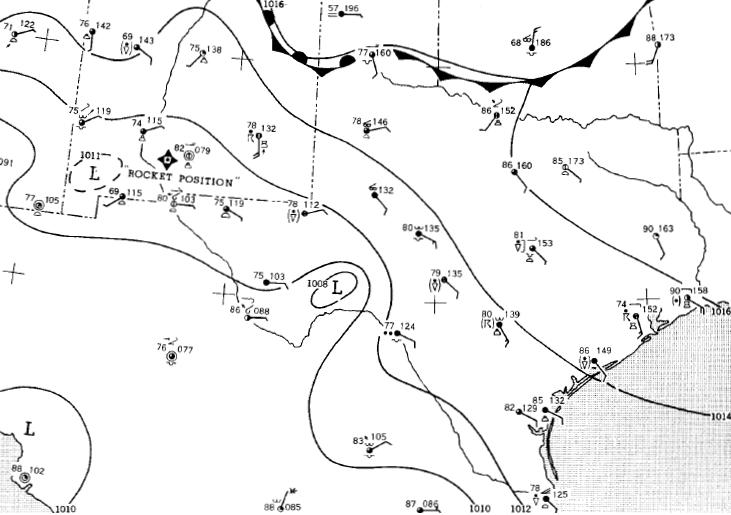
- Duration: October 2 – October 7
- Peak intensity: 35 mph (55 km/h) (1-min);

On October 2, a tropical depression moved westward from the coast of Cuba into the Gulf of Mexico. It moved westward without intensifying beyond winds of 35 mph (56 km/h), moving ashore about 40 mi (64 km) north of Brownsville, Texas. The depression weakened as it moved across southern Texas and dropped heavy rainfall. Brownsville recorded over 3 in (76 mm) in a 45-minute period, as well as about 6 in (150 mm) in six hours. The rainfall rates of about an inch per hour was the heaviest since June 1950. The depression also moved ashore with high waves and tides.

When the system reached the Big Bend region on October 5 it reintensified slightly. Around that time, the United States Navy conducted a rocket test from White Sands, New Mexico; this was despite that such tests were rarely performed when the skies were cloudy. The rocket took an unintended photograph of the depression from an altitude of about 100 miles (160 km), which became the first such large-scale image of a tropical cyclone. The depression later moved into New Mexico and dropped additional rainfall, interacting with an approaching cold front. Flooding was reported around Roswell, as well as along the Pecos River system. Rainfall in the state peaked at 9.8 in (250 mm) in Canton, New Mexico. The system dissipated on October 7.

== Storm names ==
The following list of names was used for named storms (tropical storms and hurricanes) that formed in the North Atlantic in 1954. The list was the same as 1953 with the exception of Gilda, which replaced Gail due to the latter's confusion with the term gale.

- Alice (1)
- Barbara
- Carol
- Dolly
- Edna
- Florence
- Gilda
- Hazel
- Alice (2)
- Irene (unused)
- Jill (unused)
- Katherine (unused)
- Lucy (unused)
- Mabel (unused)
- Norma (unused)
- Orpha (unused)
- Patsy (unused)
- Queen (unused)
- Rachel (unused)
- Susie (unused)
- Tina (unused)
- Una (unused)
- Vicky (unused)
- Wallis (unused)

=== Retirement ===
The practice of retiring the names of particularly deadly or damaging storms from further use in the North Atlantic basin (initially for a period of 10 years) was begun by the United States Weather Bureau following the 1954 season. The names Carol, Edna, and Hazel were the first to be retired under this policy.

== See also ==
- 1954 Pacific hurricane season
- 1954 Pacific typhoon season
- Australian region cyclone seasons: 1953–54 1954–55
- South Pacific cyclone seasons: 1953–54 1954–55
- South-West Indian Ocean cyclone seasons: 1953–54 1954–55
