= Sierra de Chiconquiaco =

Mountain range in eastern Mexico

- Location within Mexico

Highest point
- Elevation: 3,000 m (9,800 ft)
- Coordinates: 19°45′N 96°48′W

Dimensions
- Length: 70–75 km (43–47 mi) east–west
- Width: 50–55 km (31–34 mi) north–south
- Area: 3,632 km^{2} (1,402 mi^{2})

Geography
- Country: Mexico
- State: Veracruz
- Regions: Nautla Region; Capital Region

The Sierra de Chiconquiaco is a coastal mountain range in Veracruz, Eastern Mexico.

== Geography ==
The Sierra extends generally east-west. It is bounded on the north by the plain of the Nautla River, which empties eastwards into the Gulf of Mexico. On the west, the canyon of the Bobos River, a northward-flowing tributary of the Nautla, separates the Sierra from the eastern end of the Trans-Mexican Volcanic Belt. On the northeast and east, a narrow portion of the Gulf Coastal Plain lies between the Sierra and the Gulf of Mexico. On the south, it is bounded by the Actopan basin, which includes the state capital, Xalapa. The Misantla and Colipa rivers originate in the range, and flow northeastwards to empty into the Gulf of Mexico.

The Sierra includes the Naolinco volcanic field.

== Climate ==
The Sierra intercepts moisture-bearing winds from the Gulf of Mexico, and northern and eastern slopes are generally wetter. Rainfall is generally higher in the summer, except at higher elevations where it is plentiful year-round.

== Ecology ==
The Veracruz moist forests ecoregion covers lower elevations, while the Oaxacan montane forests, with both cloud and pine-oak forests, cover the higher elevations of the range. The drier Veracruz dry forests lie in the lowlands to the south, in the rain shadow of the Sierra. Most of the range has been converted to pasture or agriculture, and little undisturbed natural vegetation remains.
