= Naolinco volcanic field =

Volcanic field in Veracruz, Mexico

Coordinates: 19.67°N 96.75°W

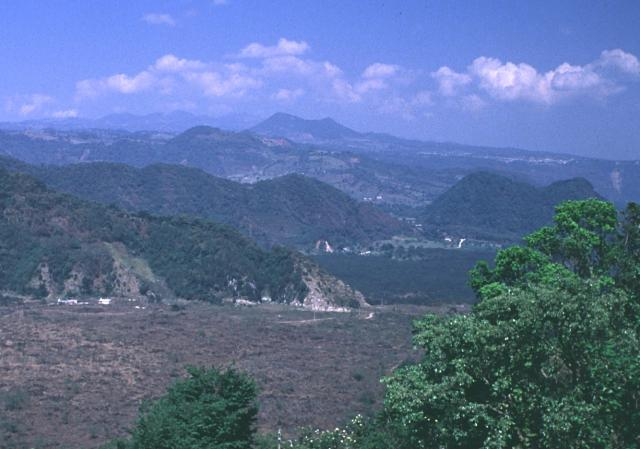

Naolinco volcanic field is a volcanic field in Veracruz, Mexico. It lies in the region of the cities of Jalapa and Naolinco, and the town of Naolinco lies in the field.

== Geologic context ==
The Trans-Mexican Volcanic Belt is best known for calc-alkaline volcanoes such as Pico de Orizaba and Popocatepetl stratovolcanoes as well as calderas and pyroclastic cones; however it also features scattered alkali basalt volcanism. It lies at an angle to the Middle America Trench unlike the more typical volcanic arcs of Central America; some theories consider the belt to be independent from the trench. In its eastern region lies the Cofre de Perote and a group of volcanoes including the Naolinco Volcanic Field.

Sometimes it and some neighbouring monogenetic volcanoes such as those at Cofre de Perote are included into a "Xalapa volcanic field", which would have about 50 volcanic centres. Despite their location, they are most likely unrelated to Cofre de Perote itself.

== The field ==
The Naolinco Volcanic Field lies in the Sierra de Chiconquiaco. It includes the volcanic cones of Cerro Acatlan, which is the largest cone in the field, Cerro el Hoyo, two Cerro Gordo cones, Cerro Organo and Pueblo Viejo. The cone Rincon de Chapultepec has a crater 275 metres (902 ft) wide. The individual centres appear to be aligned in a northeast-southwest direction. Lava flows from Naolinco volcanoes have flowed south. Pyroclastic material is also found in the area.

== Eruptive history ==
Potassium-argon dating of the field has yielded ages of 1.2 and 0.82 million years ago. Volcanic products at Naolinco are mainly basaltic.

The most recent activity at Naolinco occurred at Rincon de Chapultepec, which erupted the Coacotzintla lava flow 2,980 years before present. This lava flow reached a length of 6 kilometres (3.7 mi) and a surface area of 8.1 square kilometres (3.1 sq mi); the total volume of lava is about 122,000,000 cubic metres (4.3×10^{9} cu ft). Two other lava flows were erupted by the cone, one of which is buried by scoria. Two more recent eruptions occurred at Volcancillo and produced the more than 40 kilometres (25 mi) long Naolinco lava flow.

Future eruptions of Naolinco, especially very voluminous ones, may endanger towns and cities in the area, although most of them would affect the sparsely populated Naolinco valley unless fairly long.

== See also ==
- List of volcanic fields
