= Bobos River (Mexico) =

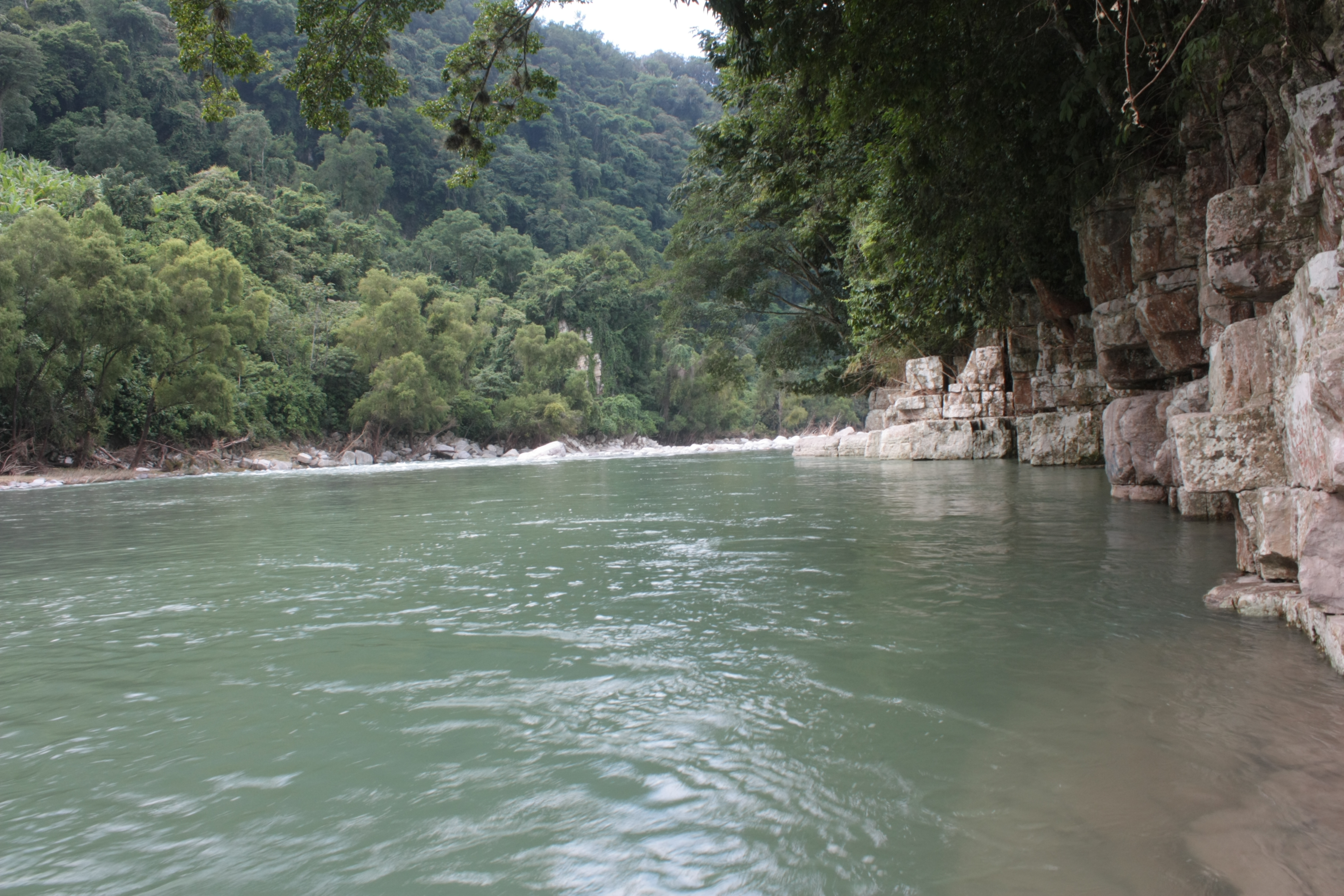

Location
- Country: Mexico
- State: Veracruz
- Region: Nautla Region

Physical characteristics
- Source
  - location: Cofre de Perote
- Mouth
  - location: Nautla River

The Bobos River, also known as the Filobobos or Filo-Bobos River, is a river of Veracruz state of eastern Mexico.

The Bobos River is a tributary of the Nautla. It originates on the northern slope of Cofre de Perote volcano, and flows northwards through a canyon before joining the Nautla, which then empties eastwards into the Gulf of Mexico. The Bobos River canyon separates the Sierra de Chiconquiaco on the east from the Sierra Madre Oriental and Trans-Mexican Volcanic Belt on the west.

A protected area, known as Río Filo-Bobos y su Entorno, protects the lower stretch of the Bobos and a portion of the Nautla River valley near the confluence. The protected area was designated in 1992, and covers an area of 105.28 km^{2}.

The river is a popular whitewater rafting location.

== See also ==
- List of rivers of Mexico
