= Nautla River =

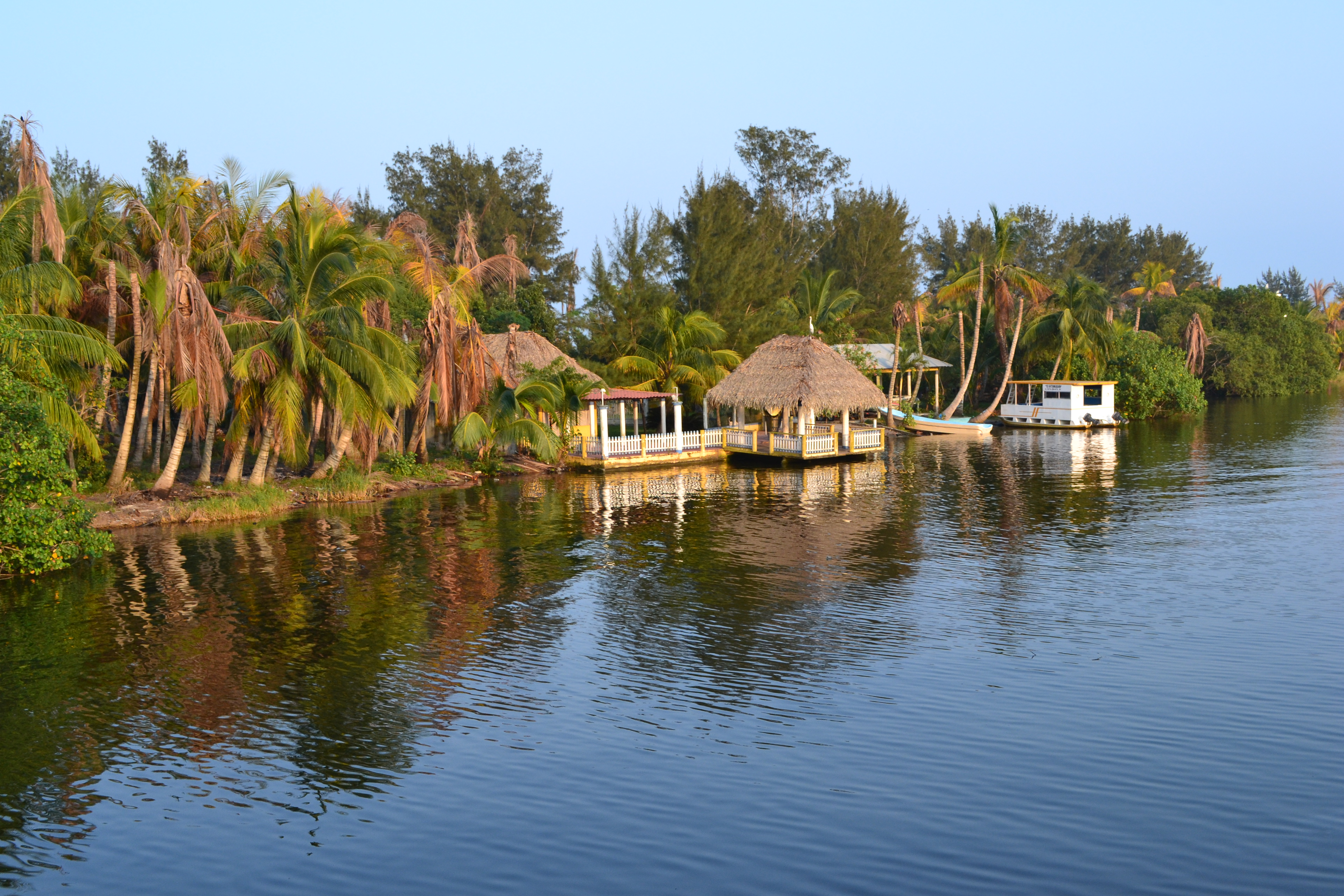
- The Nautla River in Martínez de la Torre

Location
- Country: Mexico
- state: Veracruz
- Region: Nautla Region

Physical characteristics
- Source
  - location: Cofre de Perote
- Mouth
  - location: Gulf of Mexico at Nautla, Veracruz
  - elevation: 0 meters
- Basin size: 2933 km^{2}

The Nautla River is a river of Mexico. The river starts on the northern slope of Cofre de Perote volcano under the names Altotonga or Alseseca and flows northeastwards to empty into the Gulf of Mexico. The Bobos River and Quila River are tributaries. It has the 23rd most runoff of the rivers of Mexico.

== See also ==
- List of rivers of Mexico
