= Nautla =

- Location within Mexico
- Coordinates: 20°13′0″N 96°47′0″W
- Country: Mexico
- State: Veracruz
- Municipality: Nautla
- Elevation: 4 m (13 ft)

Population (2020)
  - Total: 3,311
- Time zone: UTC-6 (Central (US Central))

Nautla (Spanish pronunciation: [ˈnautla]) is a settlement in the Mexican state of Veracruz.

Nautla comes from the Nahuatl naui, 'four'; And from tlan, that means 'place'; so it is known as 'Four Places'.

== History ==
First it was a prehispanic town that was in Casitas, Veracruz. Now it is in the municipality of Nautla. In 1519, the Totonacos had an alliance with the Spaniards and they had a battle. Nautla was destroyed by the fire. In the 16th century the king gave to Juan de Cuenca the lands of the actual Nautla, San Sebastian, and La Peña, so that they established the residence of where to stay.

== Geography ==
The village is in the middle of the Nautla and Misantla Rivers, both of which empty into the Gulf of Mexico. Nautla has an area of 358.63 km, which represents 0.49% of the state of Veracruz. The state is rich in minerals. Precious woods are the principal resource. According to INEGI, in the 2000 census, there are 2486 houses, with an average of 3.93 people living in. Most of them are owned by their owners, and the materials used are wood and rock. As the village is near the sea, the city has maritime activities like fishing, also many people dedicate to tourism.

=== Climate ===
The weather is warm, with temperatures of 25.5 °C.

== Government ==
The type of government of the village is republic, there is a governor, and he is taking care of the village. The municipal president is the one who takes the decisions and he/she/they is chosen by voting.
