= Catemaco (municipality) =

Municipality in Veracruz, Mexico

- Municipality
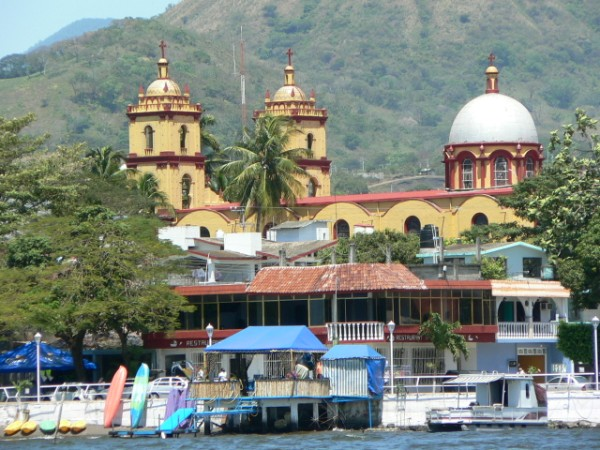
- City of Catemaco from the lake

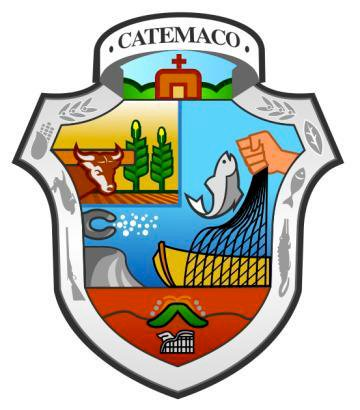
- Coat of arms

- Location in Mexico
- Coordinates: 18°25′0″N 95°07′0″W
- Country: Mexico
- State: Veracruz
- Municipal seat: Catemaco

Government
  - Municipal President: Julio César Ortega Serrano

Area
  - Total: 710.67 km^{2} (274.39 sq mi)
- Elevation: 340 m (1,120 ft)

Population (2010)
  - Total: 48,593
  - Density: 68.376/km^{2} (177.09/sq mi)
  - Municipal seat: 22,965
- Website: www.catemaco.gob.mx

Catemaco is a municipality in the Mexican state of Veracruz. It is located in the state's Los Tuxtlas region. The municipal seat is the city of Catemaco.

In the 2005 INEGI Census, the municipality reported a total population of 46,702, of whom 22,965 lived in the municipal seat. Ethnic composition is primarily of mestizo origins. Indigenous language speakers number less than 500.

The municipality of Catemaco covers a total surface area of 710.67 km^{2} along the Gulf of Mexico between the foothills of Volcano San Martín Tuxtla and the Sierra Santa Marta, and incorporate Laguna Catemaco and Laguna Sontecomapan plus a large part of the Los Tuxtlas Biosphere Reserve. Catemaco borders the municipalities of San Andrés Tuxtla to the west, Hueyapan de Ocampo and Soteapan to the south and Tatahuicapan de Juárez and Mecayapan to the east.

Economically Catemaco depends on a mix of tourism, cattle ranching, fishery and agriculture. Statistically the municipality ranks as one of the poorer ones in Veracruz.

== Settlements in the municipality ==
- Catemaco (municipal seat; 2005 population 22,965)
- Sontecomapan (2,397)
- La Victoria, (1,757)
- Zapoapan de Cabañas (1,344)
- Maxacapan (990)

== The municipality ==
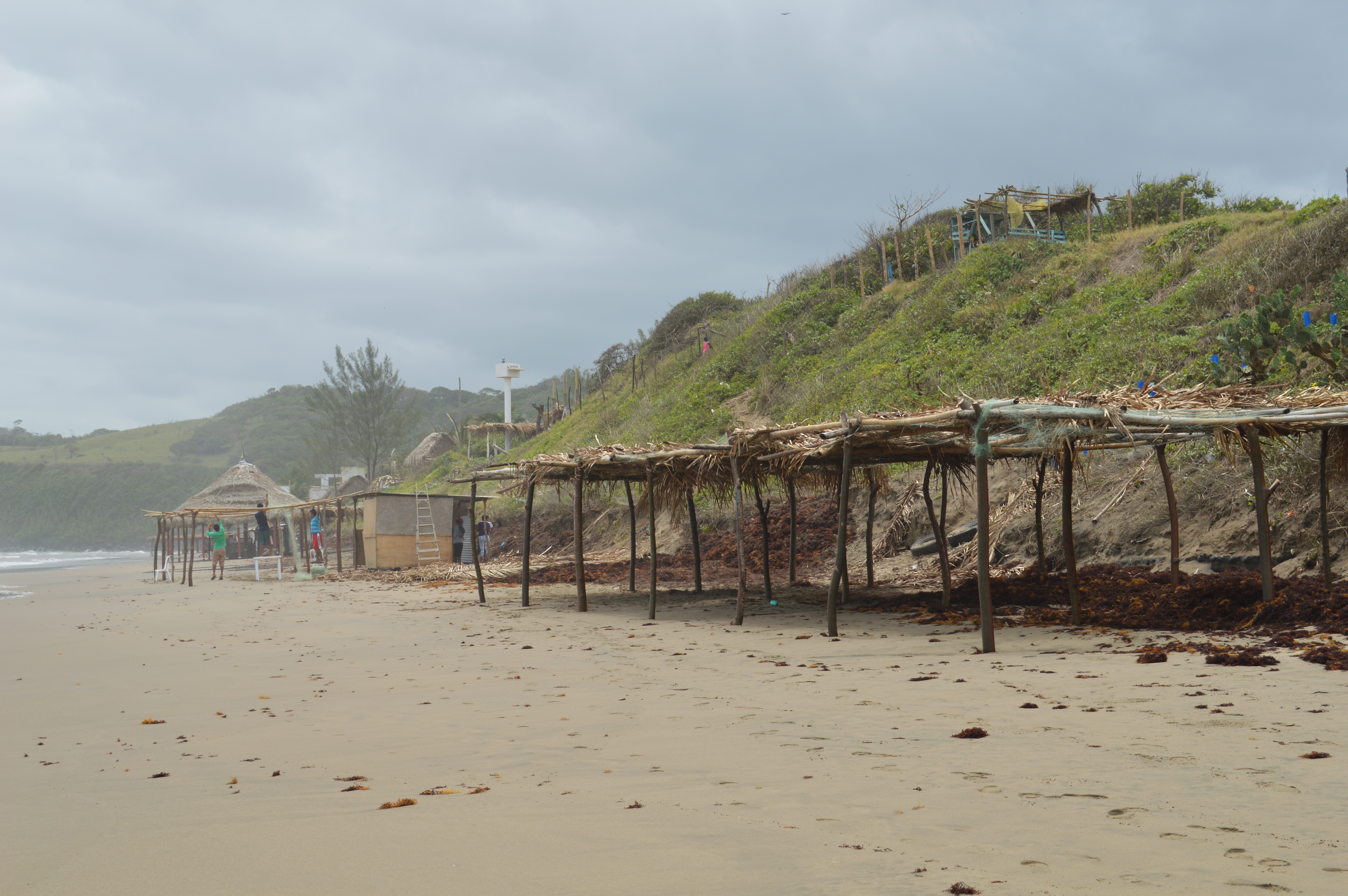
Section of the Barra de Sontecomapan on the Gulf of Mexico

The city of Catemaco is the local government for 258 communities, which cover a territory of 659.2km2. The municipality borders those of Mecayapan, Soteapan, Hueyapan de Ocampo and San Andrés Tuxtla, extending to the Gulf of Mexico in the north. The municipal government consists of a municipal president, a syndic and four representatives called regidors.

The municipality is rural with a population density of 73.7 people per km^{2}, and only the seat considered to be urban. There a small community (297) of indigenous language speakers, mostly of Popoluca. Outside the seat, the main communities are Sontecomapan (pop. 2,413), La Victoria (1,842), Zapoapan de Cabañas (1,382) and San Juan Seco de Valencia (1,237).

The municipality has 166 schools that mostly serve students from the preschool to high school/vocational level with some adult and special education. There are fifteen libraries but a 17.1% illiteracy rate.

The municipality has 204 km of major roadways, mostly state-maintained local highways. The most important road is Federal Highway 180, which connects the municipality primarily to San Andrés Tuxtla. There are no rail lines.

== Geography ==
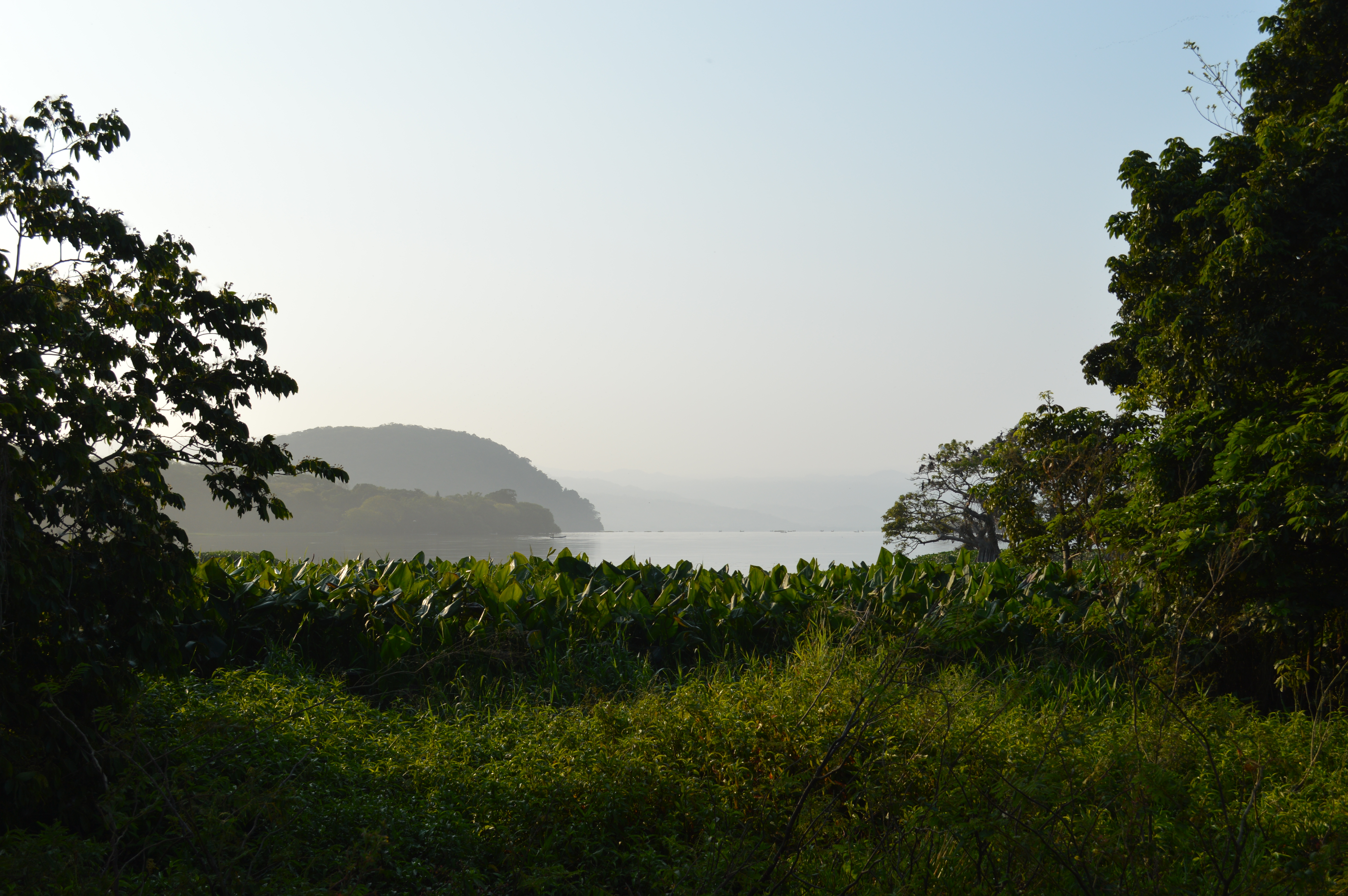
Looking towards Lake Catemaco from the Xococapan Tourist Ranch

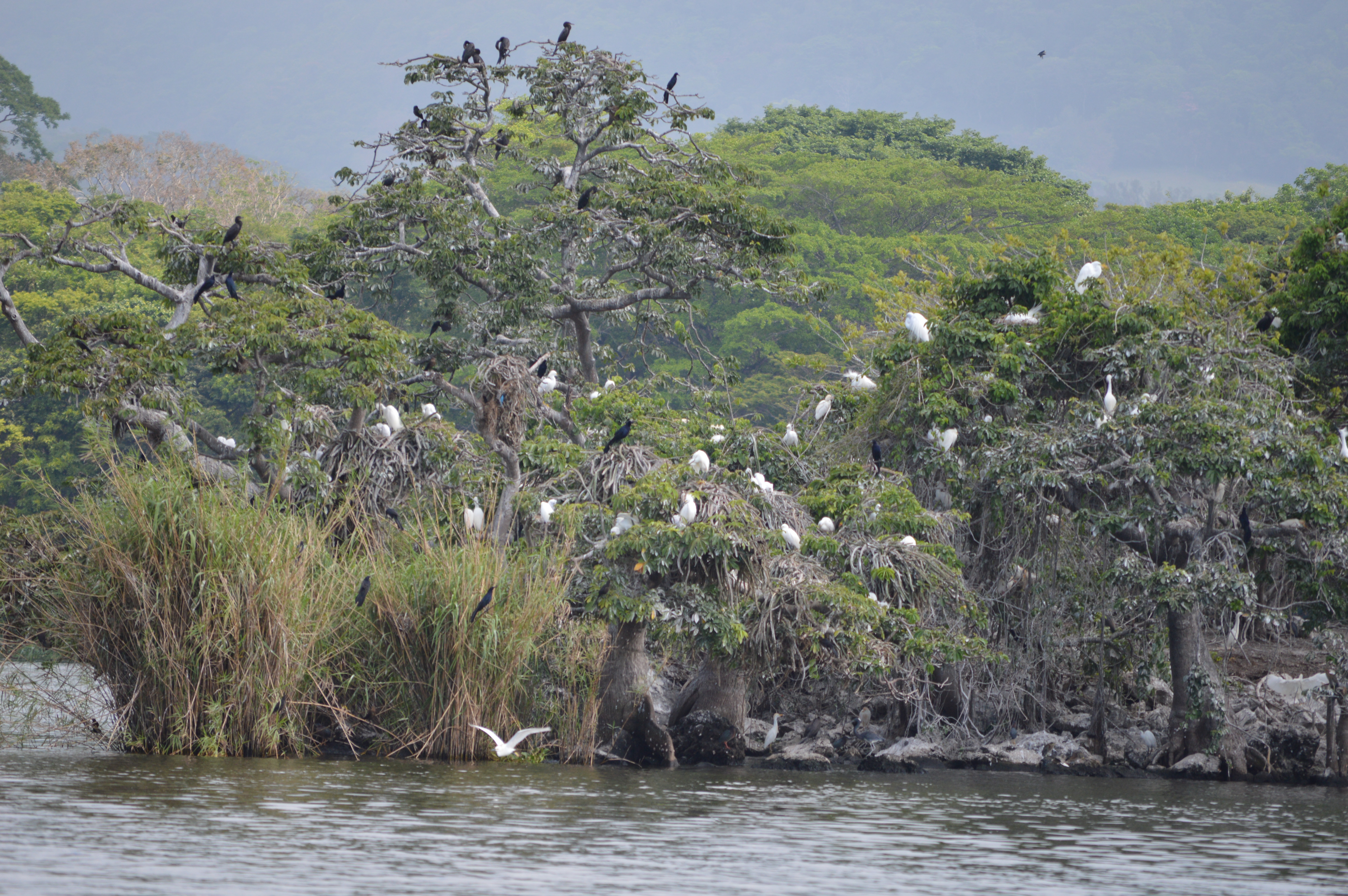
Lake island filled with herons

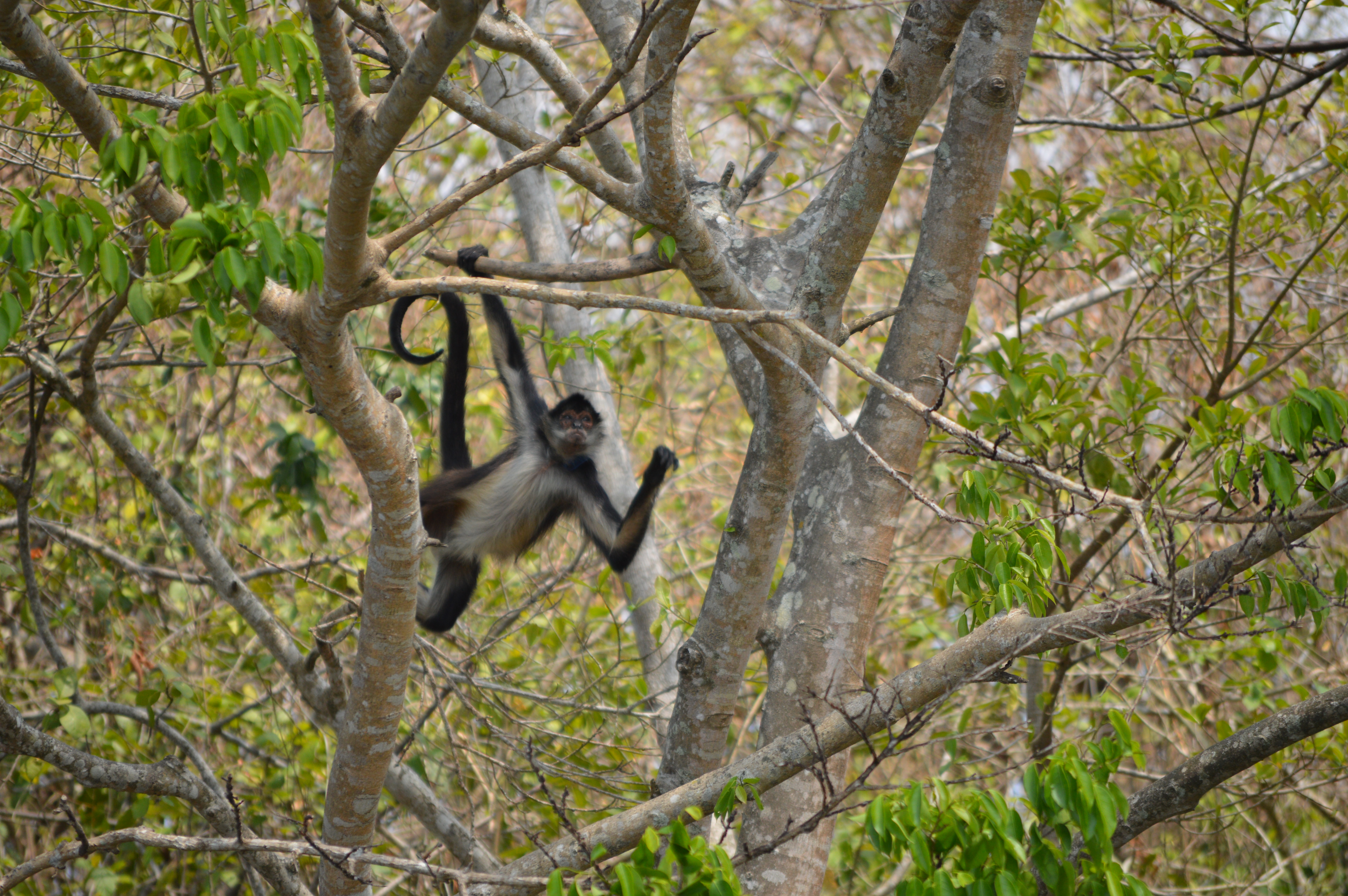
Spider monkey on island in Lake Catemaco

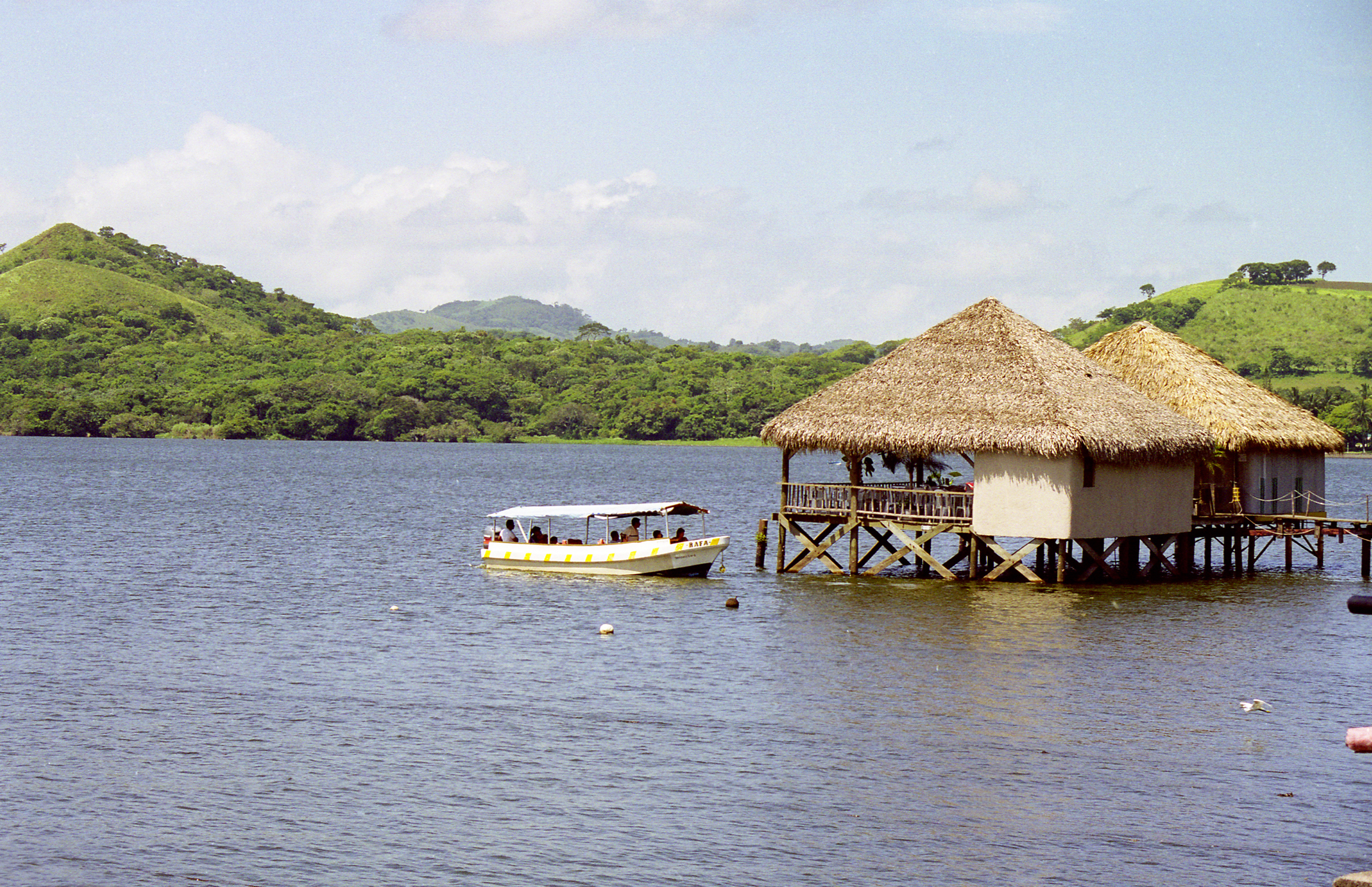
A hut on the lake

The municipality is in the Los Tuxtlas mountain region in the south of Veracruz, a rugged area of recent volcanic origin. It is in a valley between the San Martín Volcano and the Santa Marta mountain ranges, extending from Lake Catemaco to the Gulf of Mexico shore, with an average altitude of 340 meters above sea level.

=== Flora and fauna ===
Most of the wild vegetation has been destroyed, with 391.6 km^{2} (151.2 sq mi) used as pasture for animals, 50.8 km^{2} (19.6 sq mi) used for agriculture and 39.4 km^{2} (15.2 sq mi) with secondary vegetation. Only 84.8 km^{2} (32.7 sq mi) remains as rainforest and 81.2 km^{2} (31.4 sq mi) is covered by water. The soil is poor in nutrients and highly susceptible to erosion. The remaining natural vegetation is high tropical perennial rainforest, giving way to wetland vegetation and mangroves near and on the Gulf coast. Native tree species include cedar, royal palm, palo de agua, ojite (Brosimum alicastrum), ojueta, marayo and rabo lagarto (Equisetum arvense). The Nanciyaga Ecological Reserve preserve most of what is left of the rainforest that enveloped Lake Catemaco. Wildlife include small mammals such as squirrels, armadillos, rabbits, weasels and raccoons. Many bird species inhabit the lake area including herons, owls, cardinals and more. Numbers are highest in December with the arrival of migratory species. Spider monkeys were extinct but have been reintroduced in the Lake Catemaco area.

=== Climate ===
For most of the year, the climate is warm and humid. The average temperature ranges from 20 to 26C, with the coolest months from November to January and the warmest in the summer. It rains all year because of warm humid winds from the Gulf of Mexico, but annual totals vary from 1900mm to 4600mm. The quantity of rainfall also varies by season, with a relatively dry season from March to June, when totals are half that of the rest of the year. Winds are predominantly from the north. From February to October, most winds are from the northeast, which are warmer. From November to January cooler winds from the north dominate due to cold fronts from the north called "nortes."

Most of the municipality's surface water is found in Lake Catemaco and the Sontecomapan Lagoon. The area is filled with rivers and streams including the San Juan Michapan, Comoapan, San Andrés and Río Grande. Because of the area's relative ruggedness, waterfalls can be found, such as the Tepepa Falls on the San Andrés River.

=== Hydrography ===
The most important body of water in the municipality is Lake Catemaco. The lake basin was formed by volcanic eruptions of the Santa Martha and San Martín Volcanos. The lake is elliptical, with a maximum length of eleven km and a maximum width of eight km. It contains 553 million cubic meters of water and covers and an area of 73 km^{2} (28 sq mi), but is shallow, with an average depth of eight meters. The deepest part is twenty two meters, located between the city and Agaltepec Island. Various rivers and streams empty into the lake including Río Grande, Yohualtajapan and Cuetzalapan. The Rio Grande, also known as the San Andrés River, empties the lake and forms the Eyipantla Falls on its way to the Gulf of Mexico.

The lake and its twelve islands have been designation as a federal natural park. The largest of these islands is Agaltepec, 750 meters long and 150 at its widest, covering 8.5 hectares. This name is from Pipil and Nahuatl and means "stone canoe" or "canoe hill." It is also called Crocodile or Dragon Island in reference to is shape which resembles the animal when seen from certain perspectives. Its vegetation remains intact with over 1,600 trees of 63 species. In 1988 and 1989, two groups of howler monkeys, which are in danger of extinction, were brought to the Agaltepec Island as an attempt to preserve the species. Since then the animals have multiplied with over 100 and their cries can be heard in the nearby city. The island is federal property and is maintained by the Universidad Veracruzana. There is also an archeological site on the island. Tanaxpillo, better known as the "Island of the Monkeys." This name and fame comes from a colony of stump-tailed macaques that live there, introduced as part of a research project in the 1970s. They are maintained by the university although they are also fed by local boat operators. One other popular island for visitors is the Heron Island (Isla de las Garzas), a sanctuary of the species, which cover the trees and have painted them white from their excrement.

The other major body of water within the municipality is the Sontecomapan Lagoon. It is a large, shallow estuary which opens to the sea, covering 900 hectares in a very irregular shape. Its average depth is only two meters with the deepest part at five meters. The lagoon is fed by various rivers and streams with the salinity of the water increasing the closer one is to the Gulf of Mexico. It is mostly separated from the Gulf by the Barra de Sontecomapan, a stretch of beach and offshore reefs. Canals also stretch from the main body of water, and both these canals and the edges of the lagoon contain mangroves. The town of Sontecomapan, which the lake is named after, has docks for fishing and tours to see the area's vegetation, especially its mangroves.

Lake Nixtamalpan is in a crater filled from underground. Its depth is unknown but estimated at fifty meters, and covers and area of about twenty hectares.

The municipality has a coastline on the Gulf of Mexico. The most visited beaches here are Peña Hermosa in Tatahuicapan de Juárez, La Perla del Golfo in Mecayapan and Playa Escondida, most popular with foreign tourists.

== Socioeconomics ==
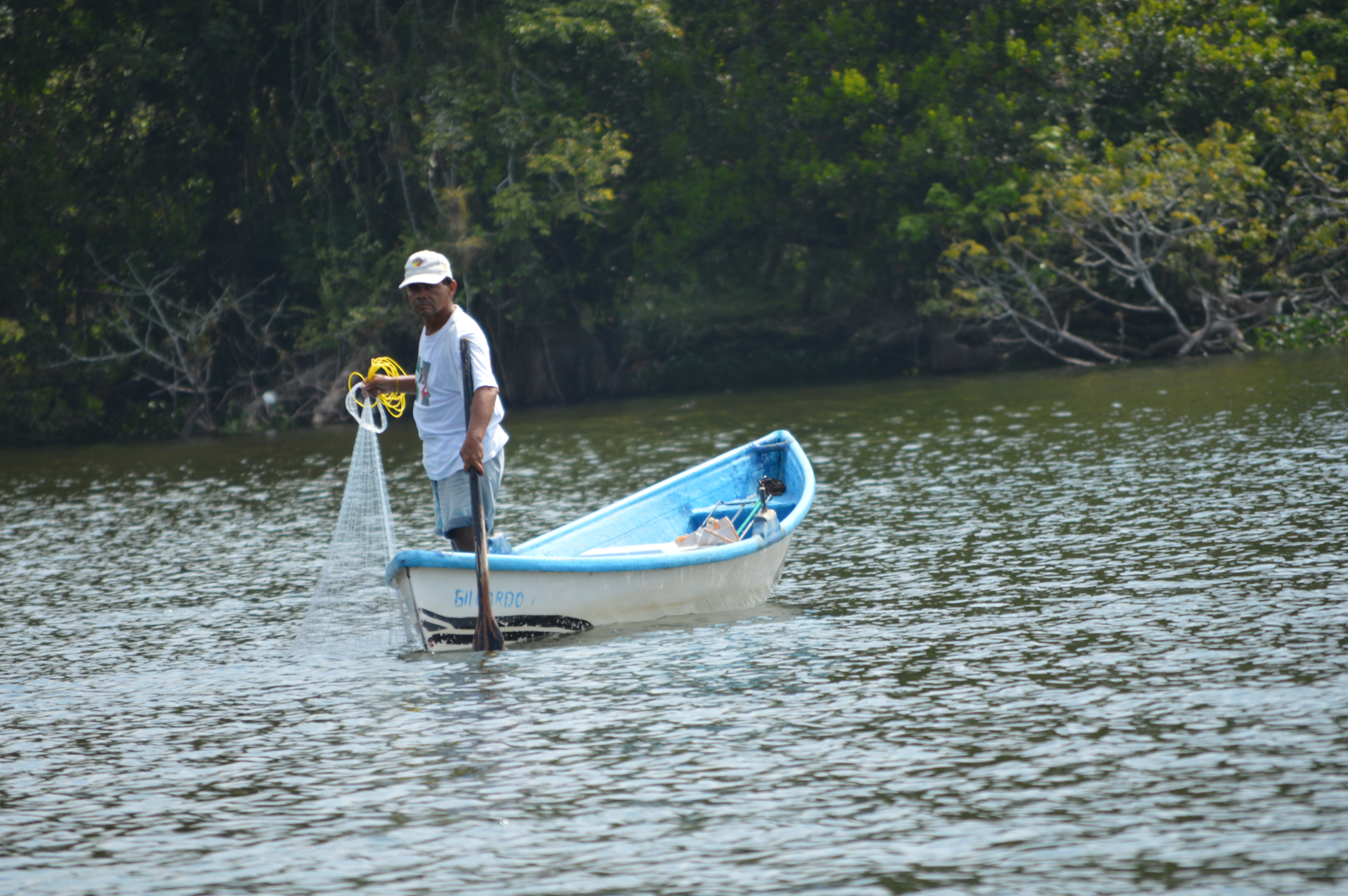
Man fishing on Lake Catemaco

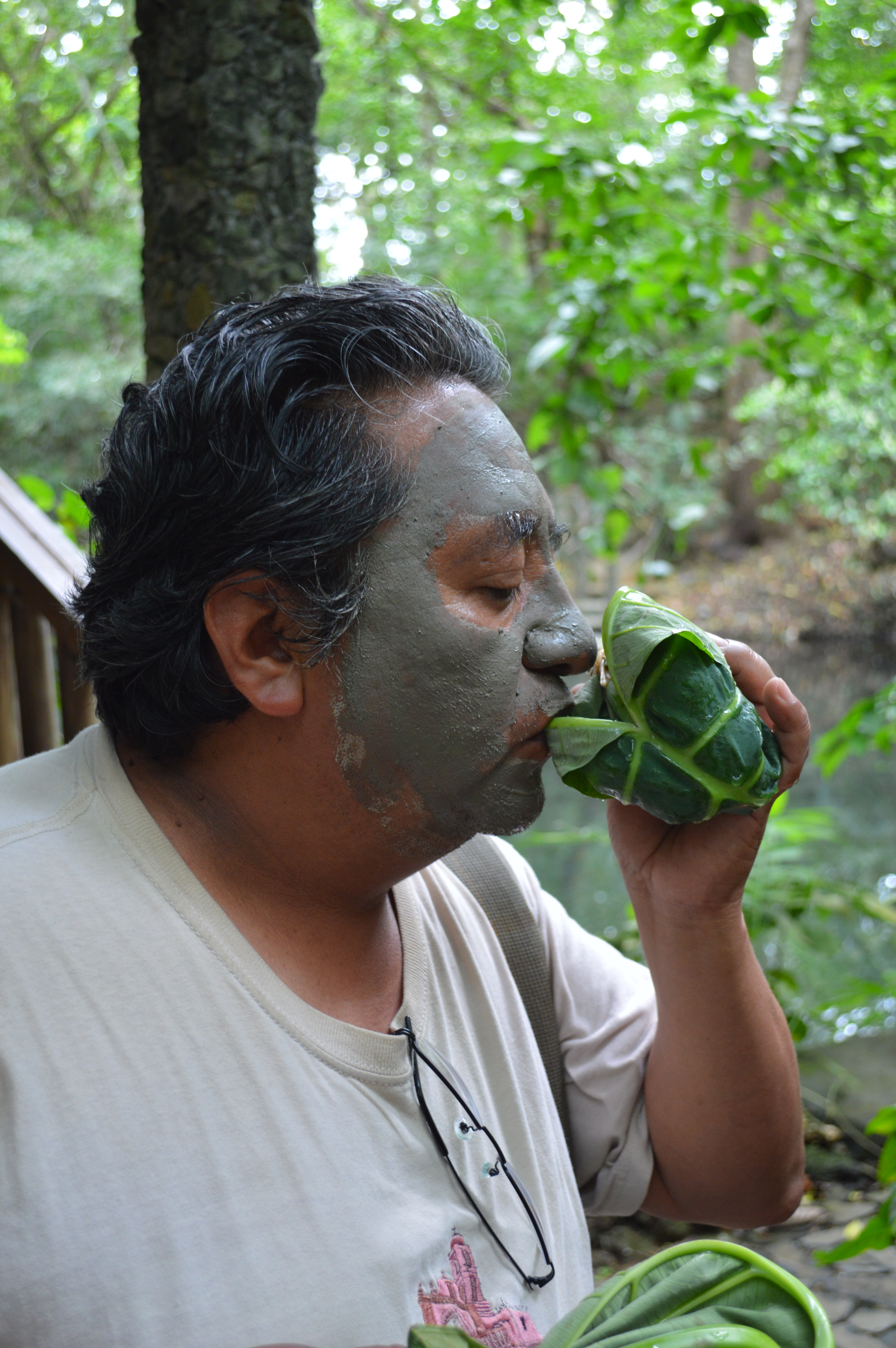
Man with mud facial drinking mineral water from leaf cup at Nanciyaga Ecological Reserve

The municipality is classified as having a medium level of socioeconomic marginalization, with 64.5% living in poverty and 13.1% living in extreme poverty. 26.9% are employed in agriculture, fishing and forestry, 15.5% in manufacturing (mostly handcrafts) and 56.9% in commerce and tourism. However, the municipality's main income is from ranching, fishing and agriculture.

The most widespread activity is ranching, mostly raising cattle, followed by pigs and domestic fowl. Next is fishing. Lake Catemaco is one of the most productive in Mexico, but large net fishing is prohibited in order avoid overfishing. However, over 2,000 fishermen earn a subsistence living capturing about 2,000 tons each year. Main catches include tilapia (an introduced species), a sardine called topote and a fresh water snail called tegogolo. The most important crops are corn, followed by coffee and green chili peppers, but beans, rice, watermelons, oranges, mangos and coconuts are also grown.

The local gastronomy is characterized by its ranching and fishing activities (both fresh and salt water). Common ingredients include tegogolos, a fresh water snail said to be an aphrodisiac, freshwater eels, tochogobi (a type of mojarra) and pork, especially a preparation called "carne de chango" because it takes like monkey meat.

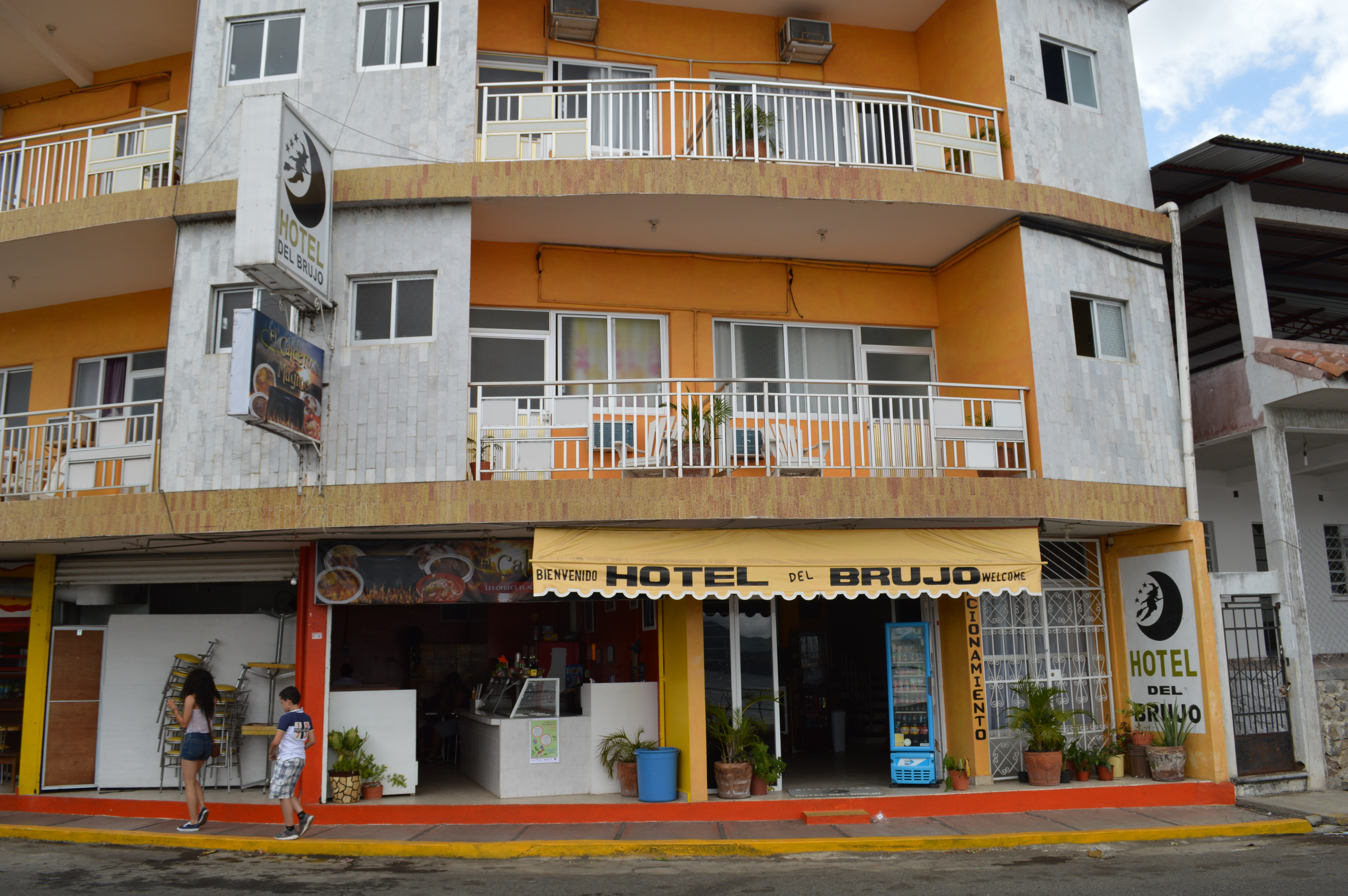
Hotel del Brujo in Catemaco

The area holds deposits of gold, silver, zinc and other materials, but there is no mining and no major industry. Handcrafts are made, mostly guitars called jarana jarochas (often decorated with snail and seashells) and decorative items for the tourist trade.

The most important commercial activity is tourism, mostly centered in the city of Catemaco. The area attracts mostly Mexican visitors, with the busiest times being traditional vacation periods such as Holy Week, some parts of summer and long weekends. Most come to see the lake, including boat tours to the various islands, and visit the sorcerers. The area has also attracted the film industry, with films such as Medicine Man with Sean Connery and Apocalypto, filmed by Mel Gibson.

Ecological tourism has grown in the municipality, allowing rural communities such as Ejido Lopez Mateos and Ejido Miguel Hidalgo to offer cabins and access to attractions such as rainforest, rivers and waterfalls, such as Cola de Caballo and Poza Reina. There are also archeological sites such as Las Margaritas and a pyramid on El Cerrito just outside Catemaco city.

The most popular attraction of this type is the Nanciyaga Ecologial Reserve, a private tourist attraction which offers tours, mud facials, cabins, ritual cleansings, temazcals, a dock on Lake Catemaco and a mineral spring. The site cover four hectares just outside the city of Catemaco and was created in 1983. The water from the mineral spring is drinkable and made available to visitors using cups made from large green leaves.
