= Los Tuxtlas =

Region in Mexico

Coordinates: 18°31′57.49″N 95°9′46.4″W

- Region
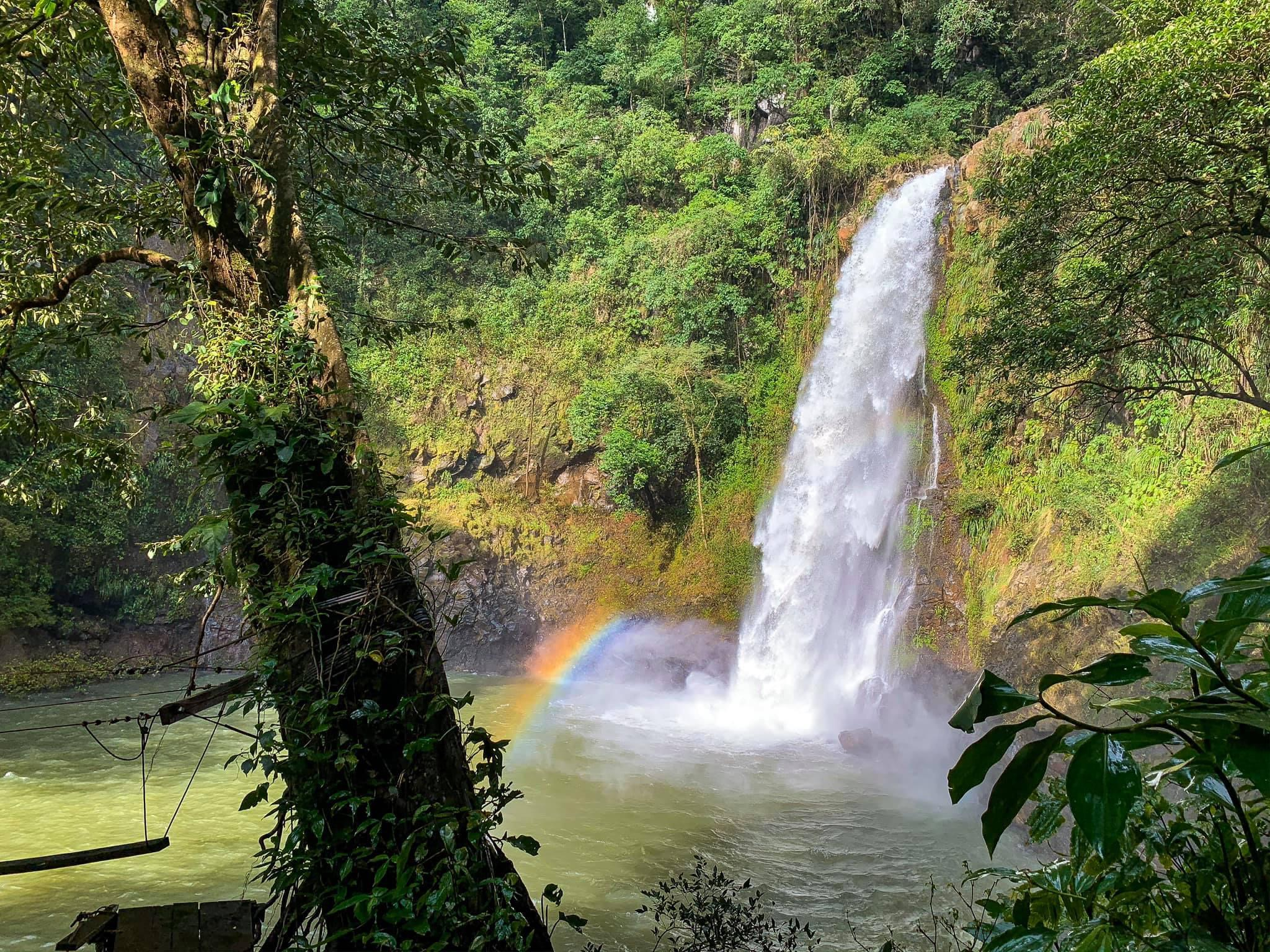
- Cascada Ceytaks en Hueyapan de Ocampo

- #9 in Veracruz
- Country: Mexico
- State: Veracruz
- Largest city: San Andrés Tuxtla

Area
  - Total: 2,944 km^{2} (1,137 sq mi)

Population (2020)
  - Total: 310,634
- Time zone: UTC−6 (CST)

Los Tuxtlas Biosphere Sign

Los Tuxtlas is a region in the south of the Mexican state of Veracruz.

Politically it refers to four municipalities: Catemaco, San Andrés Tuxtla, Santiago Tuxtla and Hueyapan de Ocampo. It also refers to a high complex natural ecosystem, an isolated volcanic mountain range next to the Gulf of Mexico, home to the northern edge of tropical rainforest in the Americas. Although seriously deforested, most of it is under protection as the Los Tuxtlas Biosphere Reserve, which stretches over eight municipalities, centering on the four mentioned above. The area's early history was influenced by the Olmecs but had its own trajectory. In the colonial period, the population became a mix of indigenous, African and European. For all its history until the present, it has been rural and agricultural. Today one of its notable crops is tobacco. However, conservation efforts since the 1970s have promoted ecotourism, especially in Catemaco.

== Geography and environment ==
=== Topography ===
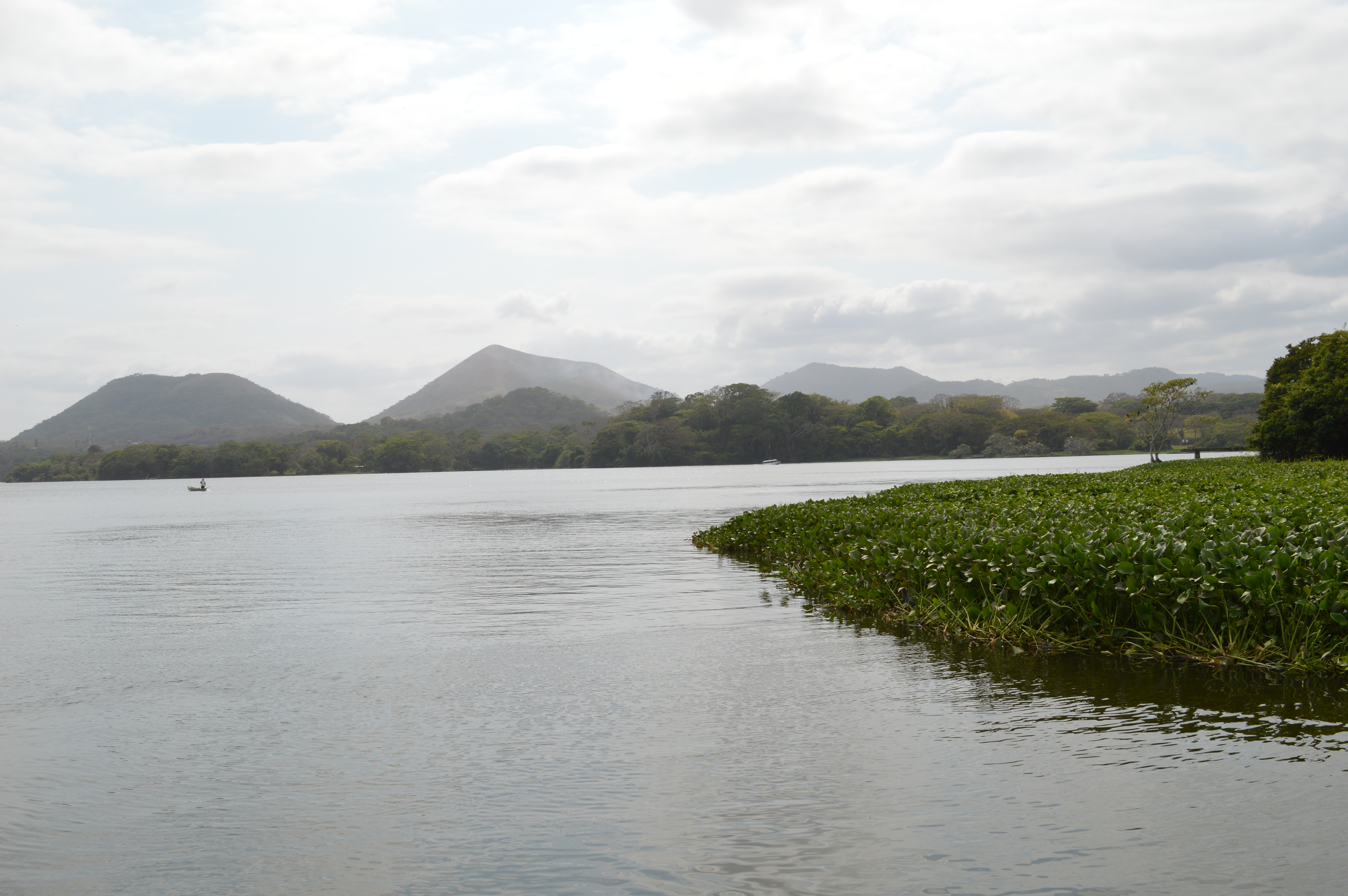
Lake Catemaco and mountains as seen from the Nanciyaga Ecological Reserve

The Sierra de Los Tuxtlas is a coastal volcanic mountain range that runs parallel with the Gulf of Mexico, 80 km long and 50 km at its widest, covering an area of 3,300km2. It is completely isolated from any other mountain range, surrounded by the Papaloapan and Coatzacoalcos River basins. It is the easternmost point of the Trans-Mexican Volcanic Belt and has high geological and ecological complexity, subject to volcanic forces as well as erosion from wind and rain off the Gulf of Mexico.

The area is still volcanically active, with evidence of activity dating back at least 800,000 years, with the oldest volcano being Santa Marta.

The most active are San Martín Tuxtla (Tiltépetl, 1,680masl), Santa Marta (1,680masl), San Martín Pajapan (1,180masl), Cerro de Campanario (1540masl), Cerro Mono Blanco (1,380masl), Cerro de Vigía or Cerro Tuxtla (860masl) and Cerro Blanco (640masl). The last recorded eruptions were of San Martín Tuxtla in 1664 and 1793. There are many other volcanic cones with forty containing crater lakes. The volcanic activity has shaped the mountain range as well as water flow.

The mountain range ends abruptly at the sea, which makes for low cliffs and small beaches, the latter usually at the mouths of rivers and streams. The main beaches include the Barra de Sontecomapan, a strip of land that mostly separates the Gulf from the Sontecomapan Lagoon and Monte Pío, where two rivers empty into the sea.

=== Vegetation ===
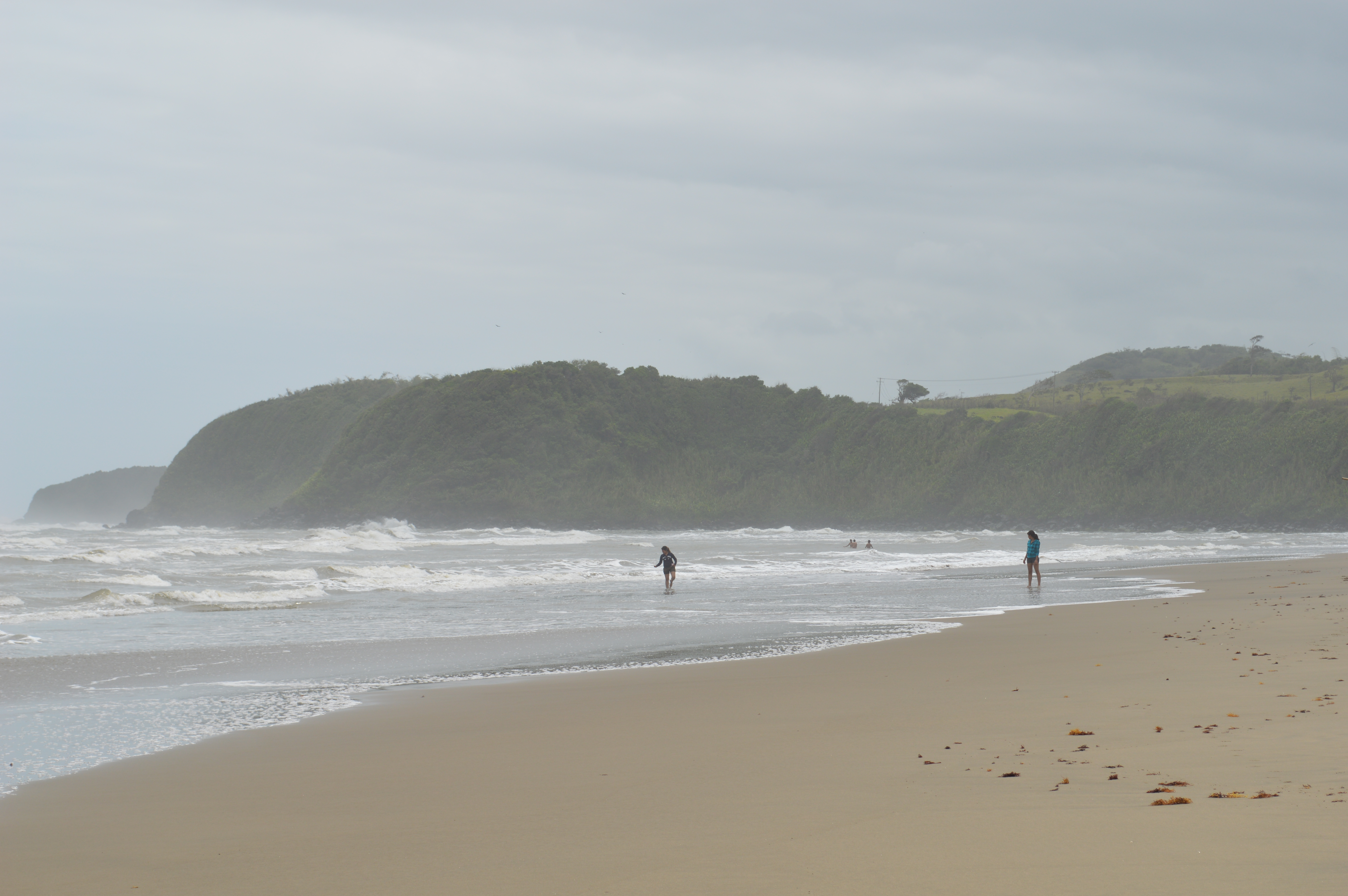
Barra de Sontecomapan

Biologically speaking, Los Tuxtlas is one of the most important regions in Mexico, a complex mixture of vegetation covering mountains and sea coast and includes the northern limit of tropical rainforest in the Americas. The dominant ecosystem is tropical rainforest but it is mixed with other vegetation. In general, the region has eleven kinds of vegetation: high perennial rainforest, medium perennial rainforest, low perennial rainforest, cloud forest, holm oak forest, pine forest, savannah, dunes, areas of tall grass (acahual) and grassland. An important part of its flora and fauna are shared with areas to the south into Central America and South America .

However, the natural vegetation has been severely depleted with estimates of what is left down as far a 5.4%. Despite this, the region is still home to 3,356 species of vascular plants, half the total of the state of Veracruz, and includes 400 species of trees. The wild vegetation is mostly found at the higher elevations, on the volcanos near the coast. Endangered species of fauna include Chironectes minimus, Vampyrum spectrum, Alouatta palliate, Ateles geoffroyii, Cyclopes didactylus. There are 15 plant species that are endemic to the region.

=== Climate ===
Los Tuxtlas is one of the rainiest areas of Mexico. Average annual rainfall is between 1,500 and 4,500mm and average annual temperature is between 8 and 36C.

=== Hydrology ===
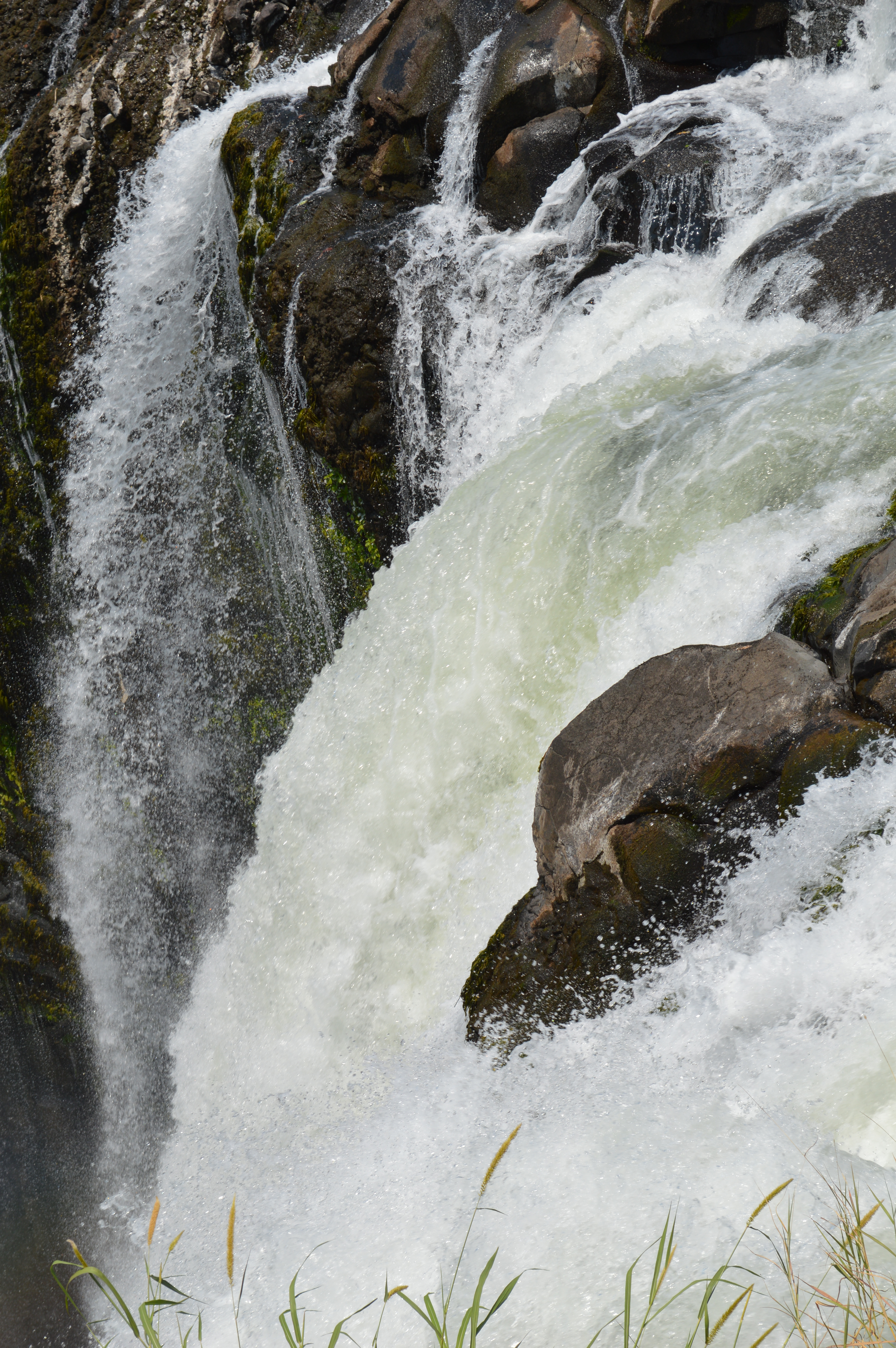
At the top of the Eyipantla Waterfall

The frequent rain support numerous rivers and stream and creates lakes, especially in dormant volcano cones, with 2.8% of the region covered by surface water. Fresh water flow in the region accounts for 14.8% of the entire state of Veracruz. The rugged terrain and water flow makes for numerous waterfalls, with the largest and best known being Eyipantla and the tallest being Cola de Caballo. The region is part of the Papaloapan River Basin, with major rivers including the Papalopapan, San Juan Grande de Catemaco, Coxcoapan, Coetzala, Ahuacapan, Hueyapan, el Carrizal, La Palma, Olapa, Yohualtapan, Arroyo de Liza, Arroyo Rejon, Cold-Maquina, Gachapa, La Palma, Oro, Prieto, Salinas and Toro Prieto. The best known lake is Lake Catemaco, which is about ten km across and contains 12 islands. The other major lakes and lagoons includes the Sotecomapan Lagoon, Esmeralda Lake, Pizatal Lake and Laguna Grande.

=== Wildlife ===
Wildlife consists of 851 species of vertebrates, 45 of amphibians, 117 of reptiles, 128 mammal and 561 bird species. It has 32% of all known vertebrate species in Mexico, eighteen of which are endemic to the region. About 180 species are considered rare, threatened or in danger of extinction. The 128 mammal species account for 28.3% of all such species in Mexico, with one endemic to the region. Eleven are threatened, 12 in danger of extinction and seven under special protection.

Four of the forty five species of amphibian species are endemic, eleven of the 117 reptile species are. These species account for 14.8% of the amphibians and 16.5% of the reptiles in Mexico.

The region is an important migratory and breeding area for many species of birds. Of the 565 bird species, two are endemic as well as three subspecies. Thirty one species are threatened, 63 under special protection and 16 in danger of extinction. 223 of the bird species of the region migrate here in the winter from farther north.

Los Tuxtlas is also home to 861 species of butterfly, 23 species of bee, 133 species of dragonfly, 272 species of beetle and over fifty species of aquatic insects.

== Municipalities ==
Municipality code	Name	Population		Land Area			Population density	
Municipality code	Name	2020	Rank	km^{2}	sq mi	Rank	2020	Rank
032	Catemaco	49,451	3	659.3	254.6	3	75/km^{2} (194/sq mi)	3
073	Hueyapan de Ocampo	41,670	4	709.9	274.1	2	59/km^{2} (152/sq mi)	4
141	San Andrés Tuxtla	162,428	1	957.4	369.7	1	170/km^{2} (439/sq mi)	1
143	Santiago Tuxtla	57,085	2	617.8	238.5	4	92/km^{2} (239/sq mi)	2
	Tuxtlas Region	310,634	—	2,944	1,136.68	—	106/km^{2} (273/sq mi)	—
Source: INEGI

=== Largest cities ===
Largest cities or towns in Los Tuxtlas Region Source:
Rank		Municipality	Pop.
1	San Andrés Tuxtla	San Andrés Tuxtla	64,445
2	Catemaco	Catemaco	28,655
3	Santiago Tuxtla	Santiago Tuxtla	15,733
4	Juan Díaz Covarrubias	Hueyapan de Ocampo	6,220
5	Comoapan	San Andrés Tuxtla	5,426
6	Calería	San Andrés Tuxtla	4,066
7	Salto de Eyipantla	San Andrés Tuxtla	4,008
8	Sihuapan	San Andrés Tuxtla	3,939
9	Hueyapan de Ocampo	Hueyapan de Ocampo	3,889
10	Tres Zapotes	Santiago Tuxtla	3,670

== Conservation efforts ==
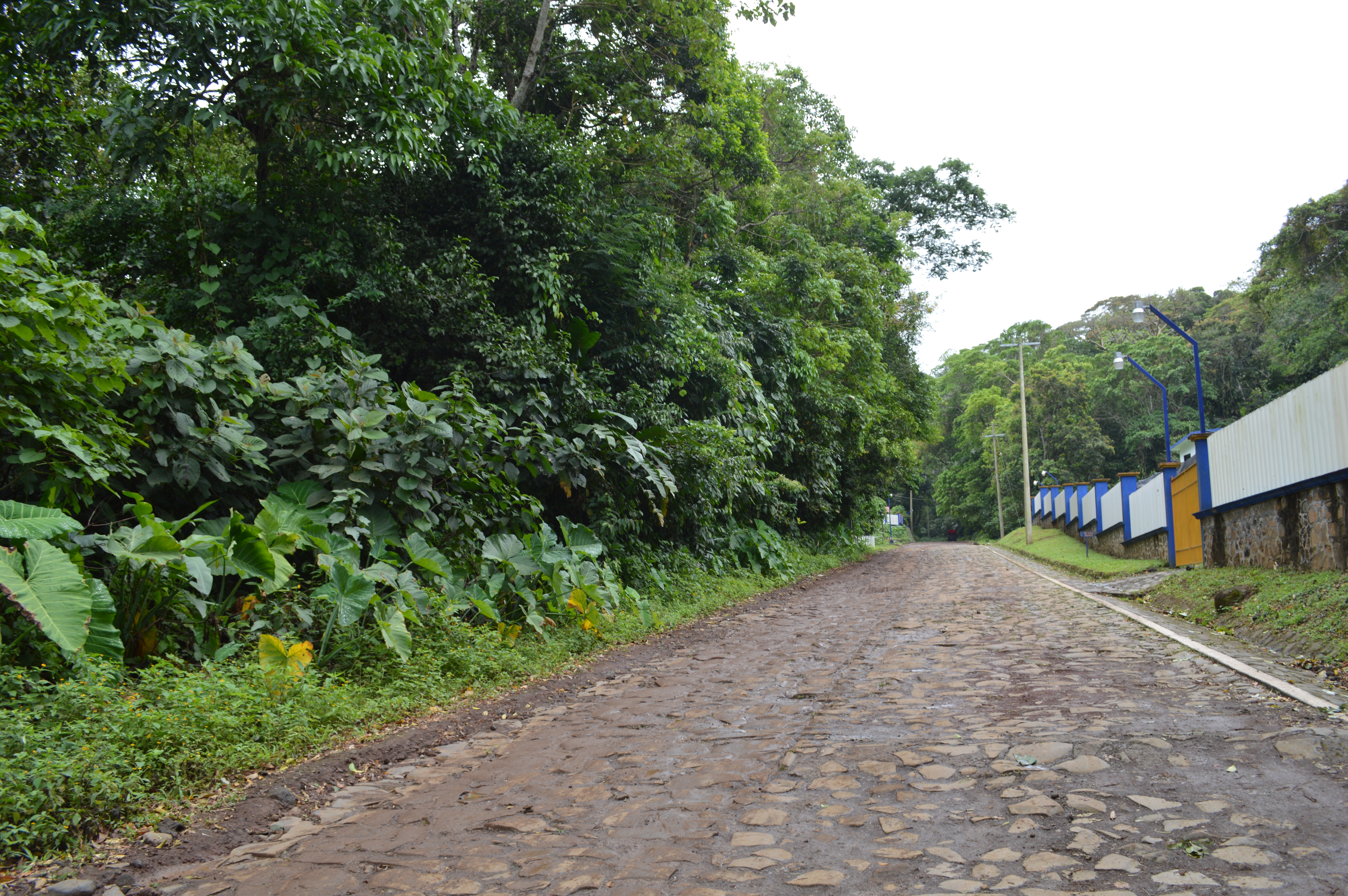
Los Tuxtlas Tropical Biology Station

The effects of human activity in the area are complex, but most of the damage comes from deforestation, creating pasture land and fragmenting forest. The deforestation has reduced rainwater capture, causing a lowering of rivers and streams. In the dry season, water from springs diminishes as well. Estimates of remaining rainforest range between 28% down to 5.4%.

Modern conservation efforts began in 1937 with efforts to halt deforestation around Lake Catemaco . Thirty years later, the Los Tuxtlas Tropical Biology Station was founded as part of the National Autonomous University of Mexico. It conducts research with an eye towards conservation of the area and directly preserves 647 hectares of tropical rainforest.

In 1979 and 1980, presidential decrees declared the areas around the San Martín and Santa Marta Volcanoes as Forest Protection Zone and Wild Animal Shelter, but this failed to stop the ecological deterioration because little action was taken locally.

In 1989, the Universidad Veracruzana acquired 220 hectares to establish the Pipiapan Tropical Park, dedicated to the study of tropical ecosystems. In 1990 and 1995, the private Nanciyaga and La Jungla Parks were created, with an area of 40 hectares along Lake Catemaco.

However, as late as 1997, there was little change in local population's consciousness of the deforestation, and the economic activities causing destruction continued. In 1998, state of Veracruz expropriated 6,318 hectares in the Sierra de Santa Marta and the federal government did the same with another 9,366 hectares around Catemaco. Then all the various protected areas were unified to form the Los Tuxtlas Biosphere Reserve, 155,122 hectares over eight municipalities: Catemaco, Hueyapan de Ocampo, Mecayapan, Pajapan, San Andrés Tuxtla, Santiago Tuxtla, Soteapan, Tatahuicapan, Acayucan, Soconusco, Chinameca and Ángel R. Cabada. The land is under federal control and managed by the Comisión Nacional de Áreas Naturales Protegidas (CONANP) as a priority region for conservation. In 2006, UNESCO recognized the Biosphere's importance on a global level.

The establishment of the Biosphere was accompanied by efforts to promote the development of eco tourism to the local population as well as changed to water and land use. Success in these efforts began to be seen around 2002. Since then, there is a program pays residents to conserve natural resources on their lands and use them in a more sustainable manner, and a number of ejidos and private lands have developed their own tourism facilities such as the Yanbigapan Rural Lodge and the Poza Reyna Eco Reserve. The federal government also promotes activities related to agro-forestry and carbon capture. The Unidad de Manejo Forestal Los Tuxtlas extends over eleven municipalities.

Conservation and other efforts have been led by federal, state and municipal authorities along with academics and non-profit organizations. However, the lack of coordination among these have hampered efforts. Successes include reforestation efforts on the campus of the Tecnológico de San Andrés Tuxtla, using native species, and the ProÁrbol program, which as of 2009 produced 414,963 plants, spread over 697 hectares. One species to be reintroduced is the scarlet macaw in 2014, after a 70-year extinction in the area and in danger of extinction in Mexico.

However, deforestation still continues, and 56% of the Biosphere is still pastureland.

== Socioeconomics ==
The political region of Los Tuxtlas is one of ten in the state of Veracruz and consists of four municipalities: Catemaco, San Andrés Tuxtla, Santiago Tuxtla and Hueyapan de Ocampo. Together, these cover a territory of 2,947km2, 4.1% of the state total. San Andrés Tuxtla and Hueyapan de Ocampo are the largest, accounting for 56.6% of the total area. This political region is bordered by the Olmeca and Papaloapan regions with the Gulf of Mexico to the east.

Most of the population is rural. As of 2010, the region had a population of 304,033 people, with a growth rate of just over 1%. Only about 54% are classified by the state as rural, with the rest living in 12 towns and cities with 2,500 people of more. However, there is a total of 860 communities in the four municipalities, with an average population of only 193 per community. The most rural is Hueyapan, with over 70% of the population being rural. The most urban is Catemaco, with about 57% living in urban areas, but most densely populated municipalities overall are San Andrés and Santiago Tuxtla.

Official tallies state that 3.7% of the population speaks an indigenous language, with 1.6% of these not speaking Spanish. However, 16,258 are stated as “living in indigenous homes,” meaning the head of the household speaks an indigenous language. An academic study put the percentage of the indigenous population at about 30%. Most of these are Nahuas and Popoulcas, with 23.8% of the total indigenous population found in Hueyapan.

The region, especially Catemaco, is known for the survival of magical practices.

Almost 60% received federal or state medical benefits. The region has education from the pre school to the undergraduate level, mostly in pre school and primary. The average number of years of school is 6.2 and there is a 20% illiteracy rate (down from 23.5% in 2005), the highest in Veracruz. In addition, 41.1% have not finished primary school, (down from 47% in 2005) .

The economic base for the region is agriculture, livestock, fishing and tourism, with the first three taking up most of the area's natural resources. Eighty-four percent of the land is used for agriculture and livestock alone.

Agriculture takes much of the area's workforce, employing 35.5%. Most of this is the growing of corn and beans for auto consumption. Indigenous homes mostly work with subsistence agriculture and some cattle raising, supplemented by seasonal labor and trade. Crops also include sugar cane, mangos, tomatoes, chili peppers, citrus fruits and carpet grass. The main cash crop for export is tobacco, which employs between 6,000 and 9,000 people per year. By far, most of the livestock raised in the region is meat and dairy cattle, even though this production is less than 4% of the total for Veracruz. Extensive cattle ranching is more likely to be done by mestizo families than indigenous ones. Most of the fishing occurs in the lakes and lagoons of the region, especially Lake Catemaco, followed by the Laguna del Ostión and the Sontecomapan Lagoon. Despite the deforestation there is still logging done, mostly in Santiago Tuxtla. Despite taking most of the natural resources and much of the labor, the primary sector of the economy accounts for only .5% of the gross regional product.

The industrial and mining sector of the economy accounts for 34.7% of the gross regional product. This is mostly in the processing of sugar cane, drink bottling and the making of tobacco products. Mining is mostly the extraction of coal and sand, along with some petroleum. It employs 16.2% of the workforce.

Commerce and services, which includes tourism, accounts for 64.8% of the gross regional product and employs 45.5% of the workforce. Most of this activity occurs in San Andrés Tuxtla and Catemaco (87.1%). Most of the tourism is related to ecotourism and Catemaco's reputation for magical practices and caters mostly to Mexican clientele.

== History ==
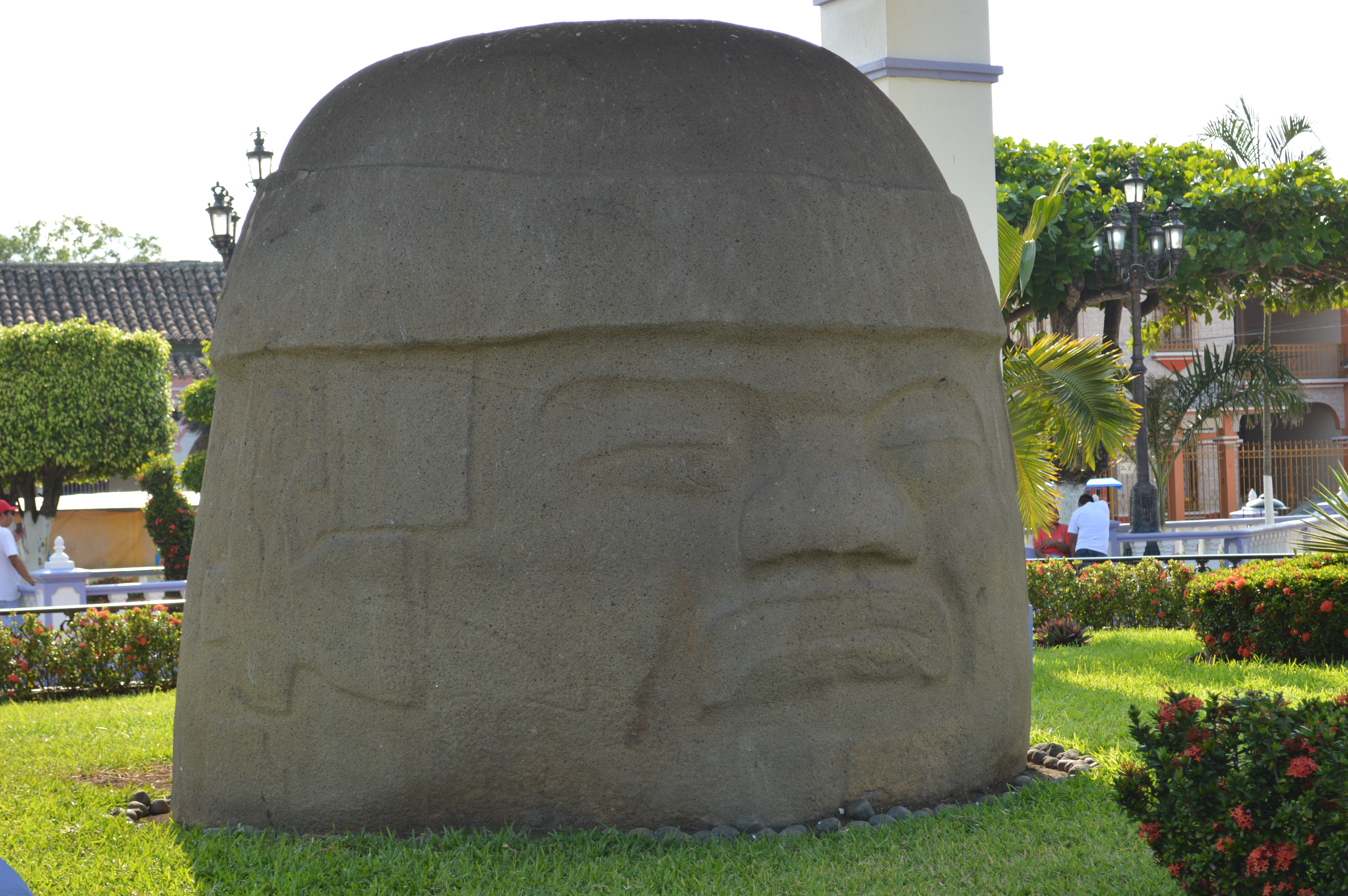
La Corbata colossal head in Santiago Tuxtla

Human settlement of the region most likely began around 8000 BCE, with forest clearing and agriculture by 2250BCE. The lack of archeological sites from this time indicates nomadic populations.

The first settlements are indicated by deposits of ceramics and obsidian flakes probably from small villages growing corn. These are concentrated along the waterways that drain Lake Catemaco. During the Pre Classic period in Mesoamerican chronology, there were at least two volcanic eruptions that disrupted the development of settlements. Around 1150 BCE, there was an eruption of the Cerro Mono Blanco, spreading volcanic ash which likely decreased soil productivity, moving populations from the upper to lower Catemaco River.

Tuxtla sites show influence and contact with the Olmec to the east, but the area was not part of the Olmec dominion. Ceramic and obsidian technologies are similar but concentrations of luxury goods such as jade beads characteristic of major Olmec settlements are absent.

Like the rest of Mesoamerica, the Los Tuxtlas populations show a shift from small, villages with little social strata to the creation of large population and ceremonial centers. Hierarchical societies define themselves in the late Formative Period (400 BCE-350CE). Chuniapan de Abajo grows to 45 hectares the largest in the area, with a central precinct, several large mounds and the earliest known Mesoamerican ball court in the central Tuxtlas. The population does not increase, but it concentrates into large settlements. The eastern, central and western zones of the Tuxtlas begin to construct centers with mounded architecture and large stone sculptures, especially in Tres Zapotes and Los Cerros. In the eastern Tuxtlas Laguna de Los Cerros emerged as a major center with settlements such as Isla as secondary. A number of large stone monuments are known to exist in Isla but their depth has prevented their extraction.

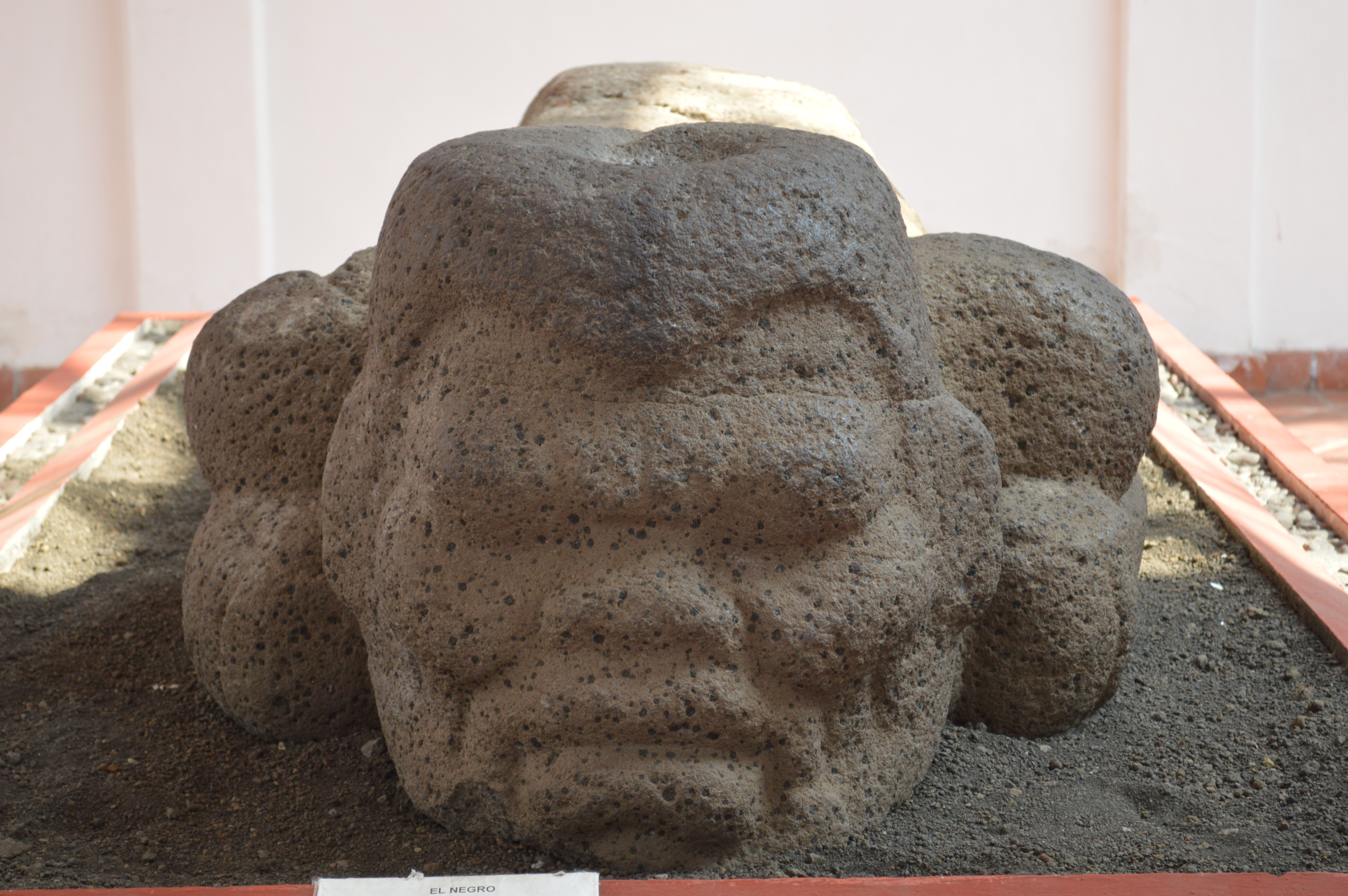
"El Negro" from the Tres Zapotes site

In the late Formative, Tres Zapotes grows to a large center, covering an estimated 300 hectares and is considered the main center in the southern Gulf coastal region. The site is characterized by three mound groups each associated with a large number of stone monuments, as well as imported items such as jade and serpentine.

In the Classic period, states emerge in the southern Gulf Coast region. In the early part of the period, the population decreased and the political center shifted to Chuniapan el Arriba, upstream from Chuniapan el Abajo. Tres Zapotes society continued to increase in complexity and there was extensive mound-building.

By 500 CE, Matacapan was a sizable settlement on the upper Catemaco River, surrounded by smaller ones. Through the rest of the classic period, it became the main political and economic center, tied to and influenced by Teotihuacan. After Teotihuacan's fall, Matacapan lost importance.

In the Post classic period, the edge of the Aztec Empire made it way to the western edge of this area. The principle center for this occupation was Totogal, in the Santiago Tuxtla municipality near the earlier settlement of Tres Zapotes. This occupation gave the region its current name, from the Nahuatl word toxtla meaning rabbit.

Except for Totogal, there are no indications of other major settlements, although Spanish documents at the time of the Conquest show that it was populated. After the Spanish took control, they resettled the indigenous population away from Totogal and into new centers such as Santiago Tuxtla. During the colonial period, the population became a mix of indigenous, African and European, with the area also attracting migration from other parts of New Spain .

The ecology of the region was first studied in 1793 when José Marian Mociño described the eruption of San Martín Tuxla Volcano. Later studies occurred in the 19th century and the beginning of the 20th, describing the geography, collecting animal and plants and studying archeological sites and indigenous populations.

In the 1950s and 1960s, there were many studies of the flora and fauna of the region, including a major study by the Comisión Técnica Consultiva para la Determinación Regional de los Coeficientes de Agostadero (COTECOCA) between 1966 and 1967 and the publication of an extensive overview of the geology and environment published by Robert F. Andre in 1964 called A Biogeographical Investigation of the Sierra de Tuxtla in Veracruz, Mexico. Research continued in the latter 20th century with more interdisciplinary studies leading to the establishment of the Los Tuxtlas Research Center.

Until the 1960s, the area was primarily rainforest, but demographic changes, especially population growth has caused to coverage of rainforest to decrease to about 38% of what it was. The deforestation worsened when the government encouraged cattle ranching here in the 1960s and 1970s. By 1986 only 15 or 16 percent of the original rainforest remained and by 2004 down to an estimated seven to 10 percent. What is remaining is fragmented.

Starting in the late 1970s and early 1980s, conservation policies began to emerge and the encouragement of ecotourism, promoted as an alternative for sustainable development. However, the frailty of the fragmented rainforest allowed Hurricane Stan in 2005 to serious damage, felling large trees.
