= Maxacapan, Veracruz =

Coordinates: 18.38333°N 95.11667°W

Maxacapan is a village and ejido, with a population of 981 in 2010, within the municipality of Catemaco, located on the edge of Laguna Catemaco, 4 kilometres (2.5 mi) south of Catemaco City in south-central Veracruz. Locally, the ejido is well known for its tegogolos harvested from Laguna Catemaco.
