= Poecilia catemaconis =

Bicolor molly

Scientific classification
- Domain: Eukaryota
- Kingdom: Animalia
- Phylum: Chordata
- Class: Actinopterygii
- Order: Cyprinodontiformes
- Family: Poeciliidae
- Genus: Poecilia
- Species: P. catemaconis

Binomial name
- Poecilia catemaconis Miller, 1975

Species of fish

Poecilia catemaconis, the bicolor molly, is a livebearer fish from Mexico.

Poecilia catemaconis belongs to the Poecilia sphenops species complex within the Mollienesia subgenus. It is most closely related to P. sphenops, being derived from an Atlantic-slope population of that species. The specific epithet refers to Laguna Catemaco, which the species inhabits.

The body is slender and elongated but the caudal and dorsal fins (especially in females) are short. Females grow to about 86 mm in standard length, while males attain 64 mm. When in breeding mood, the male's caudal and dorsal fins are half-bluish black, half-bright orange; similarly, the body is also partly golden. Horizontal rows of orange spots appear on the side of the body. The female's colors are duller.

Poecilia catemaconis is known only from Laguna Catemaco, a freshwater lake in the eastern Mexican state of Veracruz, its tributaries and its outlet. Young and immature specimens have been observed in a shallower (up to 1.2 m deep) tributary of the lake, but the adults have only been collected in deep, open waters of the lake, the temperature of which is about 24 °C. P. catemaconis is the only Poecilia species in Mexico in which adults are restricted to deep water. Virtually devoid of aquatic plants (other than sporadic growths of Ceratophyllum and Nymphaea), the lake is also home to populations of Dorosoma petenense, Astynax fasciatus, Vieja fenestrata, and fellow livebearers Heterandria bimaculata, Poeciliopsis catemaco and Xiphophorus helleri, as well as Crocodylus moreletii.

Poecilia catemaconis is a viviparous species. It reproduces year round, with fry production peaking in April and September.

Poecilia catemaconis is an important species in the commercial fishing by local fishermen, who use nets to catch the fish. This exploitation is not officially registered.
