= Hueyapan de Ocampo =

- Municipality
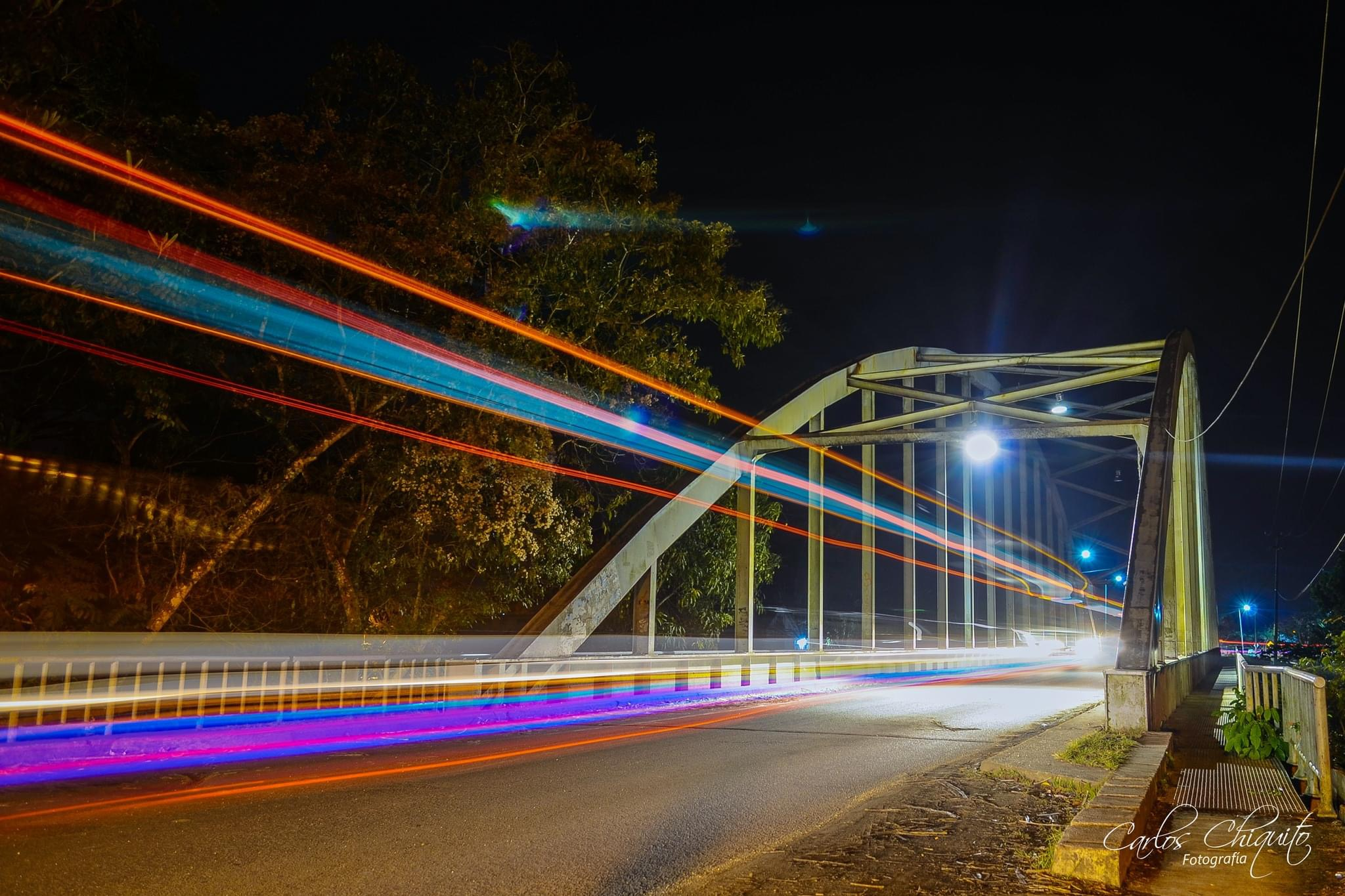
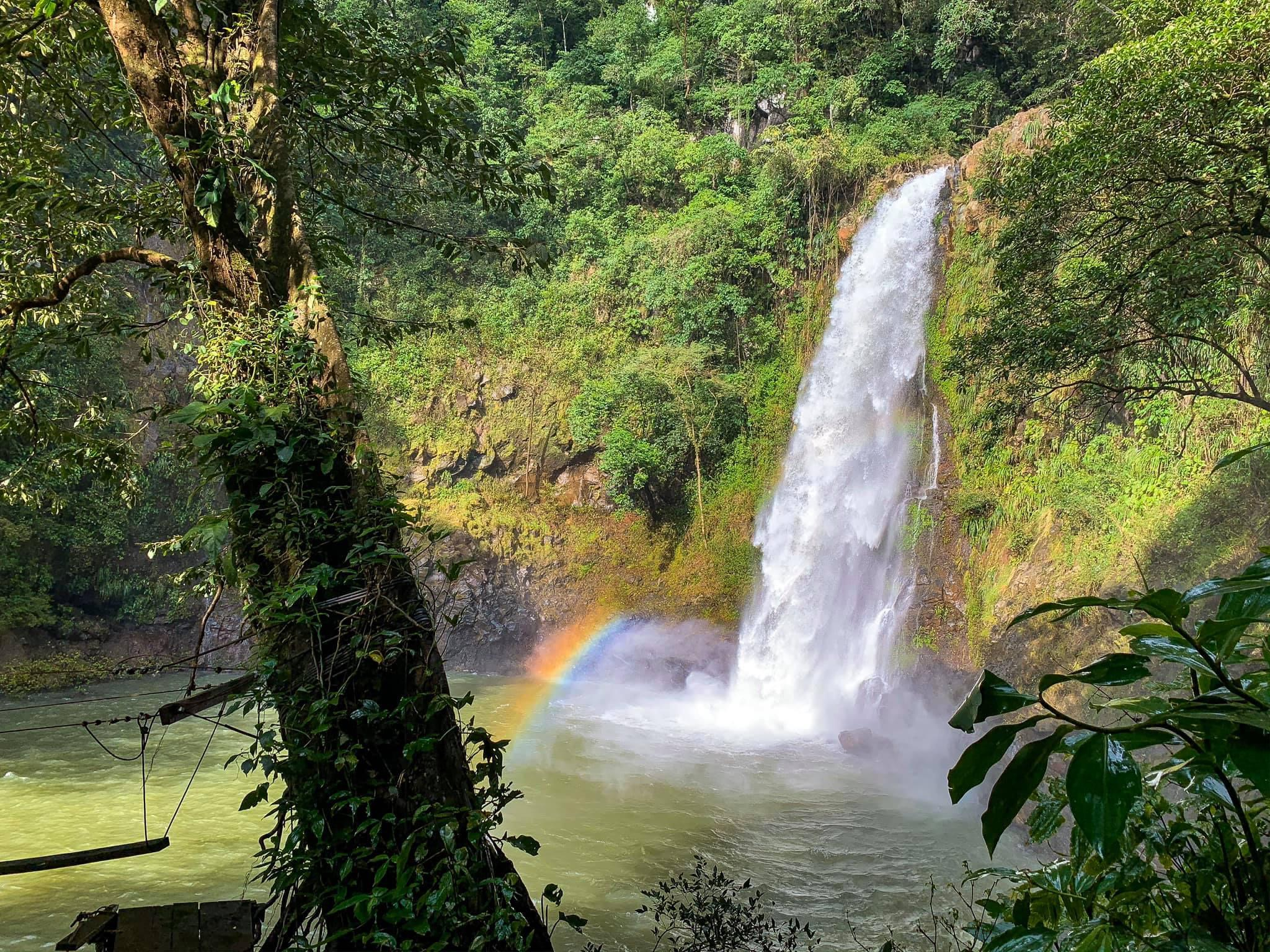
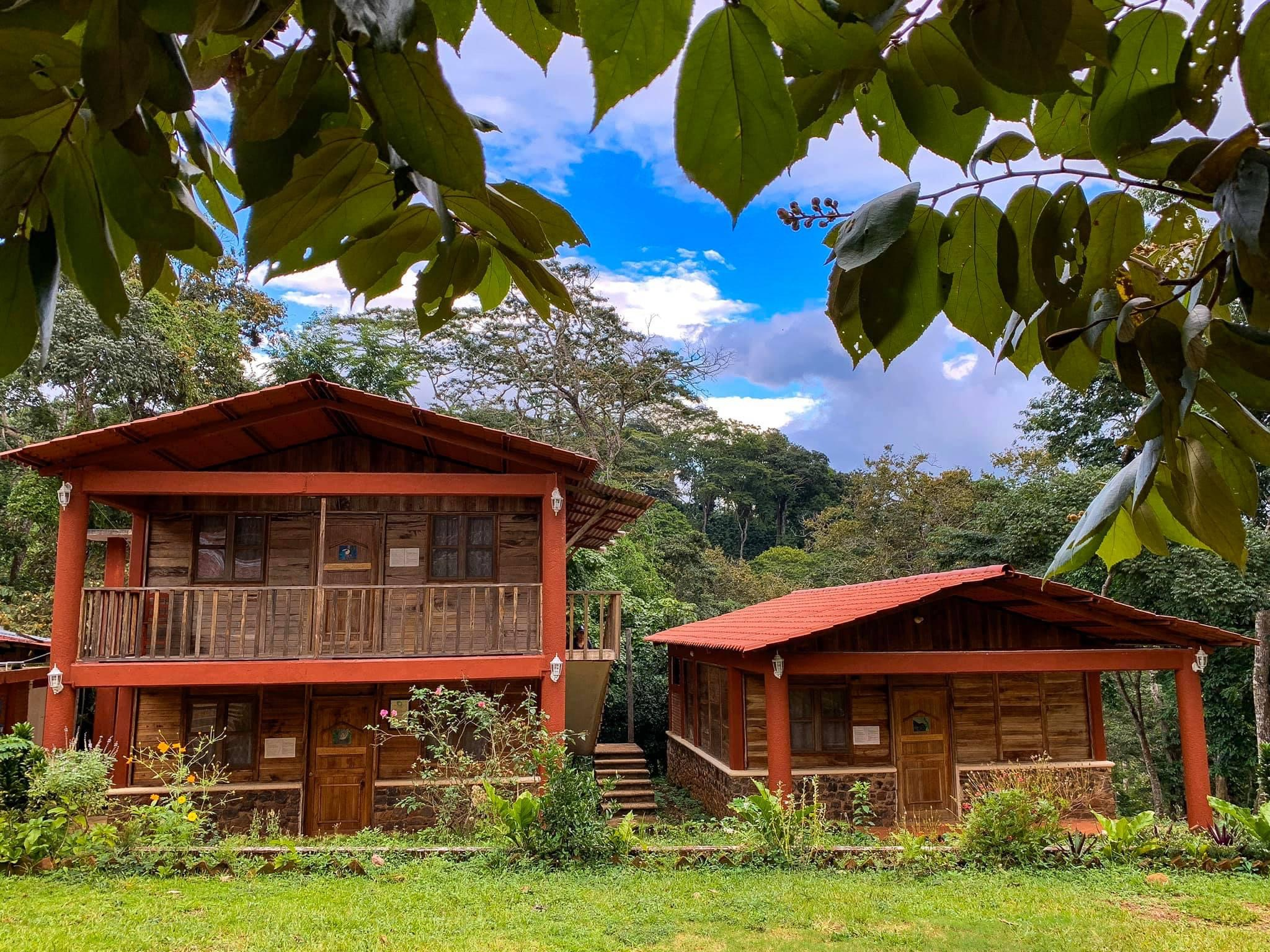
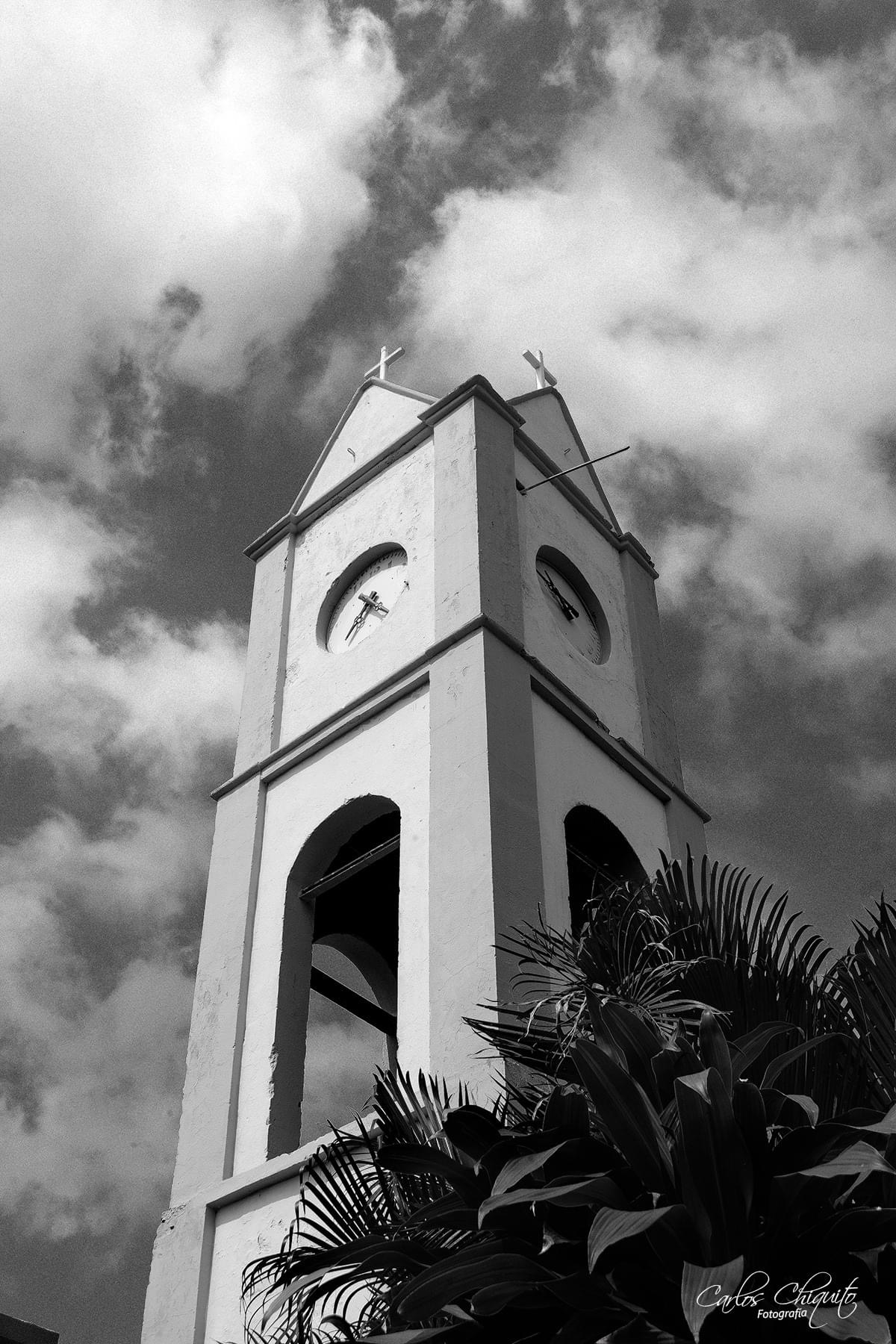
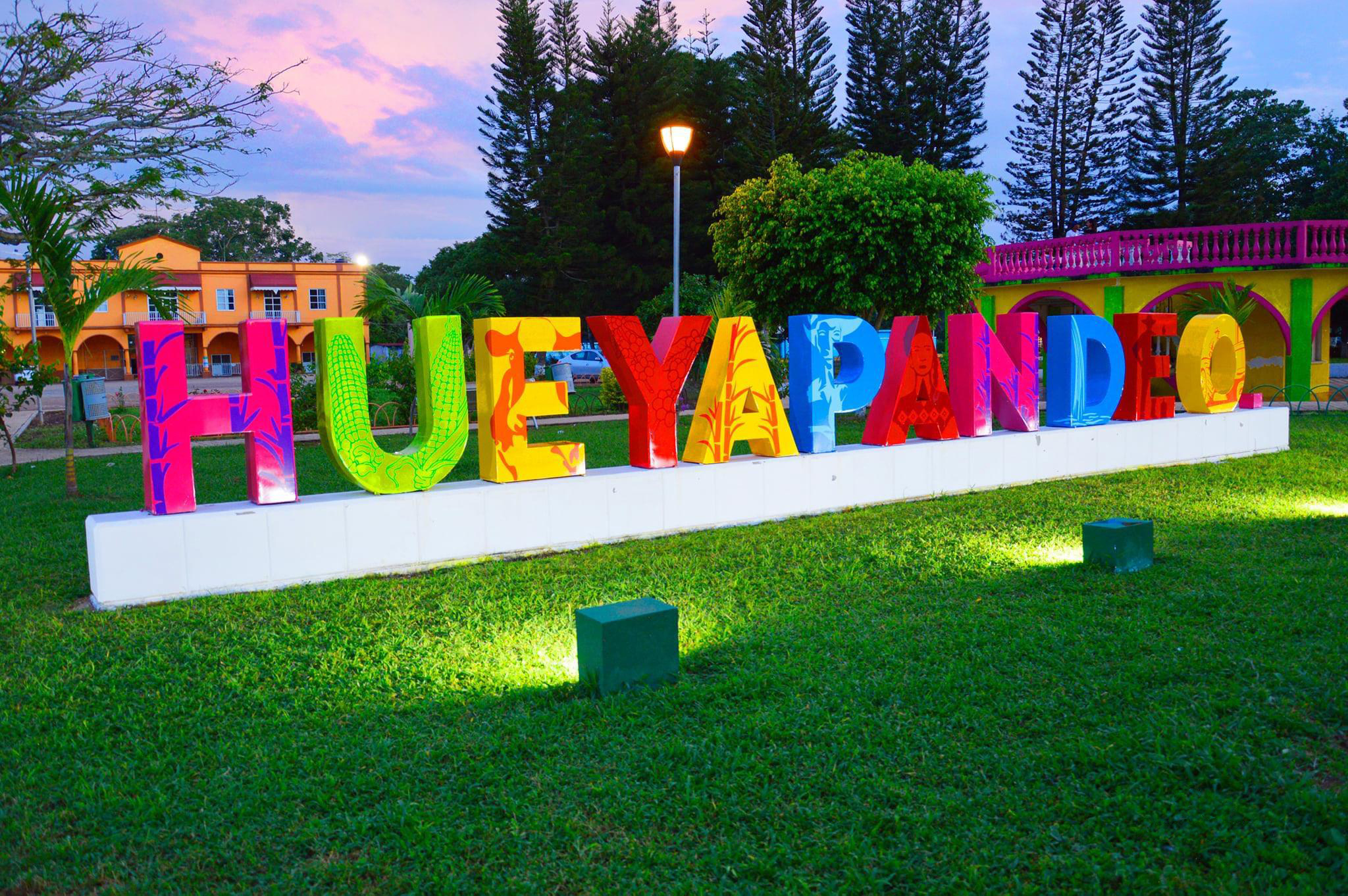

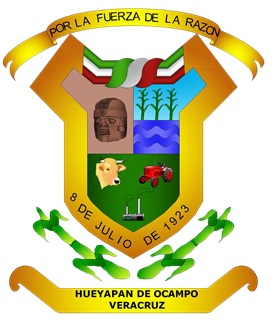
- Coat of arms

- Location within Mexico Hueyapan de Ocampo (Mexico)
- Coordinates: 18°09′N 95°09′W
- Country: Mexico
- State: Veracruz
- Region: Los Tuxtlas

Government
  - Municipal President: Juan Gómez Martínez

Area
  - Total: 824.18 km^{2} (318.22 sq mi)

Population
  - Total: 41,670
  - Density: 46.33/km^{2} (120.0/sq mi)
- Time zone: UTC-6 (CST)
- Website: hueyapandeocampo.gob.mx

Hueyapan de Ocampo is a municipality in the Mexican state of Veracruz. It is located in south of the state, about 245 km from state capital Xalapa. The municipality has an area of 824.18 km^{2}.

The municipality of Hueyapan de Ocampo is delimited to the north by San Andrés Tuxtla and Catemaco, to the south by Santiago Tuxtla, Acayucan and Juan Rodríguez Clara, to the east by Soteapan and to the west by Isla.

The municipality's primary economic activities include agriculture, livestock farming, and industry. It comprises 80 localities with a total population of 41,670 people.

== History ==
The name Hueyapan de Ocampo originates from the Nahuatl language. Hueyapan is derived from huey (big or great), atl (water), and pan (place), meaning "place of great water" or "great river" The de Ocampo part of the name comes from Melchor Ocampo, likely in honor of the Mexican statesman and reformer. Therefore, Hueyapan de Ocampo can be translated as Place of the Great River of Ocampo.

In 1831, Hueyapan de Ocampo was a settlement within the jurisdiction of Acayucan. The territory that now comprises the municipality was originally made up of various cattle ranches. By decree on June 26, 1923, the municipality of Hueyapan de Ocampo was established, incorporating congregations from Acayucan, with the congregation of El Coyol designated as the municipal seat. The municipality was named in honor of Lic. Melchor Ocampo, who collaborated with President Benito Juárez in drafting the Reform Laws.

Until the early 1990s, the locality of Cuatotolapan had a railway branch that connected from the main town of San Andrés Tuxtla to Juan Rodríguez Clara. From there, travelers could continue either north or south throughout the country. This branch operated throughout the first half of the 20th century as a means of transportation for people. Today, only the old railway station remains, as the tracks have been removed.

In the mid-20th century, the Gulf Coast Highway (Highway 180) was constructed, which connects the main town and the municipality to the central and southern parts of the country. There is also a state highway that links the main town and some localities to the Tinaja-Coatzacoalcos highway.

== Principal ecosystems ==
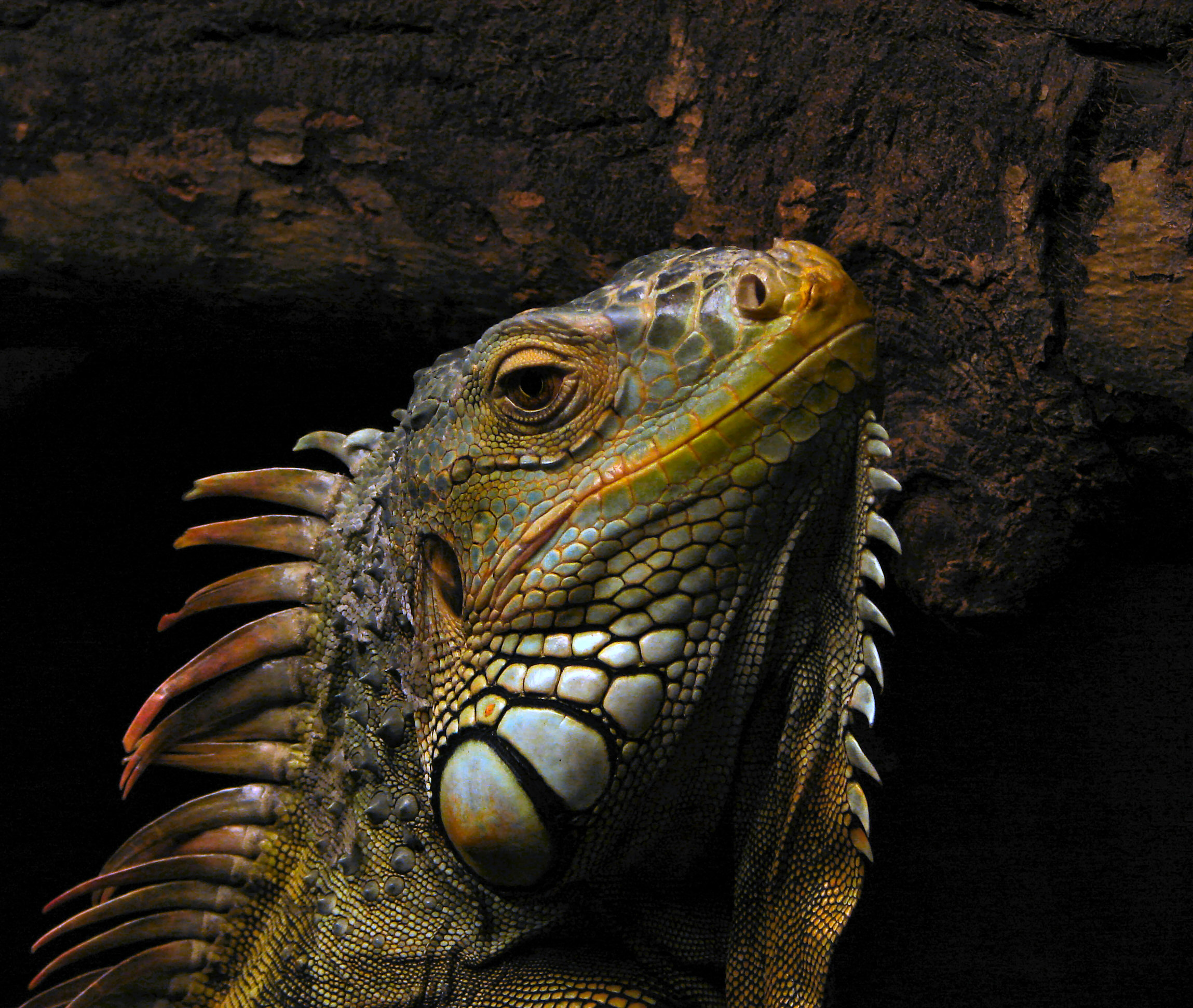

In Hueyapan de Ocampo, being a municipality in the state of Veracruz with rich biodiversity, it is possible to find a variety of common animals, both terrestrial and aquatic. Some of the animals that could be common in that region include:

- Green iguanas: Reptiles that usually inhabit wooded areas and near bodies of water.
- Howler monkeys
- Toucans and parrots: Colorful birds characteristic of tropical jungles and forests.
- Freshwater fish: In rivers and nearby bodies of water, you can find diverse species such as tilapia, mojarras, and catfish.
