= Eyipantla Falls =

Waterfall in San Anrés Tuxtla, Mexico

Coordinates: 18°23′5.8″N 95°12′28.07″W

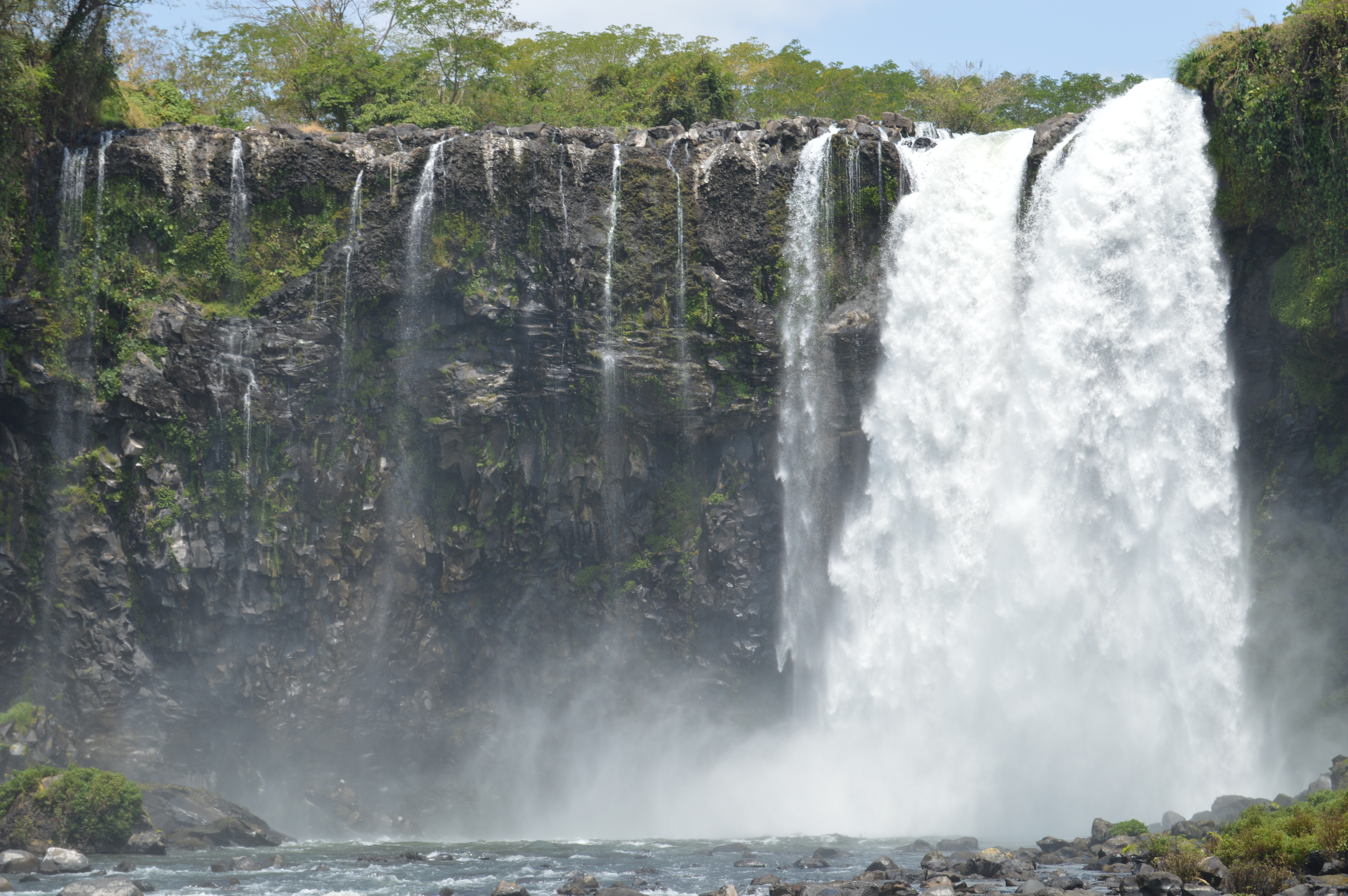
View of the falls from below

Eyipantla Falls is a waterfall located in the Los Tuxtlas region of southern Veracruz in Mexico. It is forty meters wide and fifty meters tall and is the largest and most important waterfall in the region.

It is located in the municipality of San Andrés Tuxtla in the south of Veracruz, Mexico, 10km from the city of San Andrés Tuxtla. It is part of the Catemaco River, which drains Lake Catemaco towards the Gulf of Mexico .

The name Eyipantla is from Nahuatl and means, “three streams of water.” According to legend, the rain god Tlaloc was said to reside here. The water that falls is divided by rocks forming streams, especially in the drier seasons.

It is a major tourist attraction, visited by over 500 people per day, with restaurants and souvenir stands crowding the entrance and parts of the waterfall area itself. Visitors can view the falls from two perspectives, from below and from a platform at the top. The upper point also allows for views of the surrounding mountains and river. Access to the bottom involves descending 244 stairs.

Two films have been shot here, Medicine Man with Sean Connery in the early 1990s and Mel Gibson’s Apocalypto in 2006.
