= Los Tuxtlas Biosphere Reserve =

Mexican protected nature area

- Biósfera Los Tuxtlas
- IUCN category VI (protected area with sustainable use of natural resources)
- Location within Mexico
- Location: Los Tuxtlas, Veracruz, Mexico
- Nearest city: Catemaco
- Coordinates: 18°29′02″N 95°00′36″W
- Area: 1,551 km^{2} (599 mi^{2})
- Established: 1998

The Los Tuxtlas Biosphere Reserve or Biósfera Los Tuxtlas, is a biosphere reserve located in the coastal and higher elevations of the Sierra de los Tuxtlas, in Los Tuxtlas of Veracruz state, in south eastern Mexico.

== Ecoregion ==
The area is notable for its diversity of plants and animals. It contains the neotropical Sierra de los Tuxtlas tropical rainforest ecoregion, of the tropical and subtropical moist broadleaf forests biome.

Other Tropical and subtropical moist broadleaf forests in the region include:

- Veracruz moist forests
- Petén–Veracruz moist forests
