= Soteapan =

- Municipality and City
- Location within Veracruz Location within Mexico
- Coordinates: 18°14′N 94°52′W
- Country: Mexico
- State: Veracruz

Area
  - Total: 528.07 km^{2} (203.89 sq mi)
- Elevation: 613 m (2,011 ft)

Population (2000 estimate)
  - Total: 27,487
- Time zone: UTC−6 (CST)

Soteapan is a municipality and city located in the south-central zone of the Mexican state of Veracruz, about 260 km from state capital Xalapa. As of 2000, the municipality counted 27,487 inhabitants within 528.07 km^{2}, including about 10,000 in the main city area of Soteapan.

== History ==
Historically the city of Soteapan was mentioned as a part of the municipality of Coatzacoalcos by colonial Spanish references, yet was only recognised as a separate Mexican municipality in 1831.

The area in the pre-columbian era was an area of contention between the Aztec empire and its southern neighbours.

The area only recently obtained paved road access and is considered to be one of the most impoverished communities in Mexico. Its population is composed of mainly of Popoluca, with a small number of Nahula people. Though many speak the native Popoluca language, Spanish is the predominant language.

== Geography ==
The municipality of Soteapan is delimited to the north by Gulf of Mexico, to the east by Mecayapan, to the south by Chinameca and Acayucan, and to the west by Hueyapan de Ocampo and Catemaco.

== Economy ==
Economically, Soteapan depends on small-scale agriculture and cattle ranching. The area invites many tourists due to several waterfalls and views of pristine mountains.

The area is located near the volcanoes of the Sierra de los Tuxtlas and is located within a large part of the Los Tuxtlas Biosphere Reserve.

== Celebrations ==
During March there is a celebration to honour to San José, the patron saint of the town, and in December there is a celebration to honour to Virgen de Guadalupe.
