= Tatahuicapan =

Municipality in the Mexican state of Veracruz

Coordinates: 18°15′N 94°46′W

- Municipality
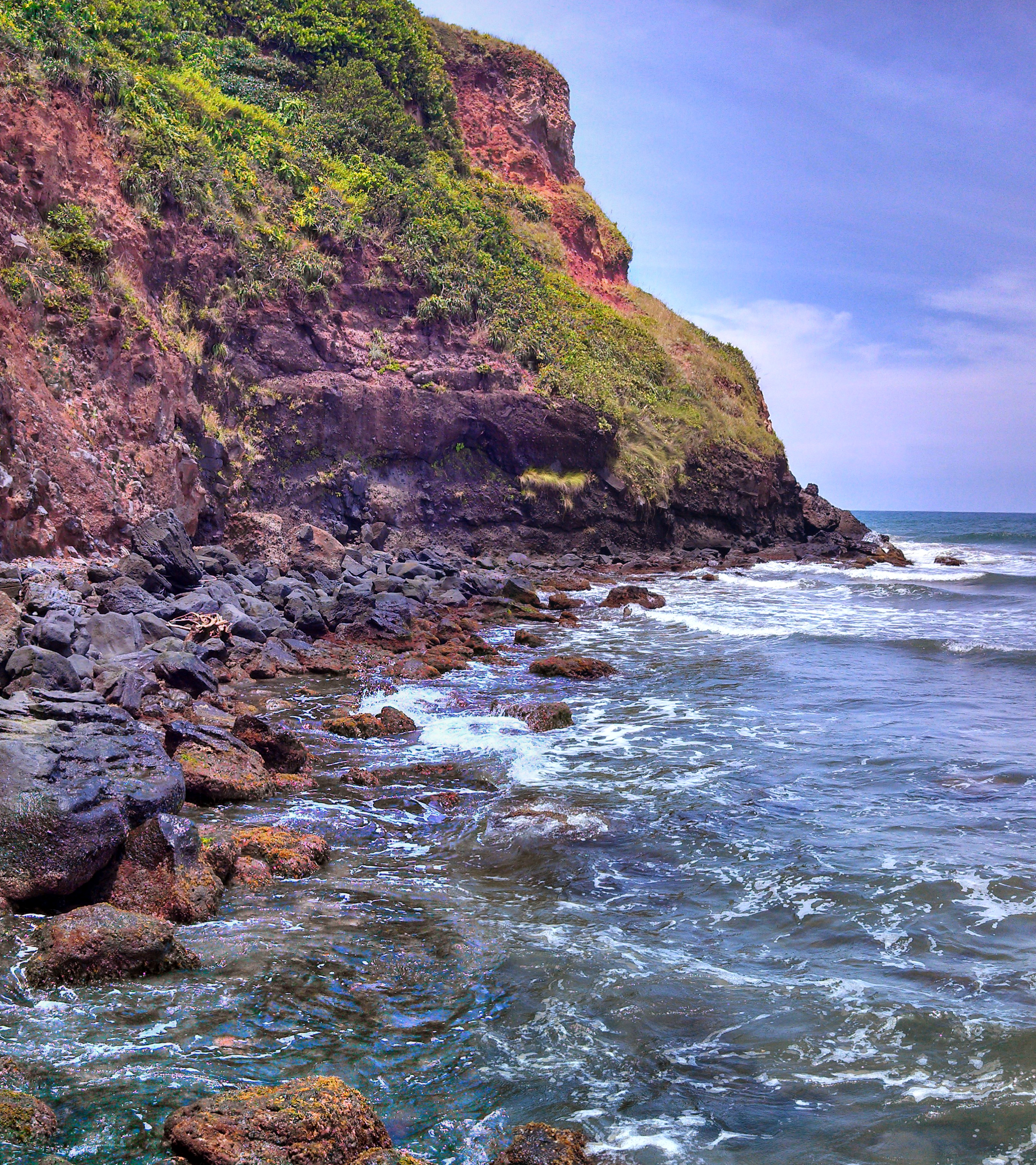

- Location in Mexico Tatahuicapan (Mexico)
- Country: Mexico
- State: Veracruz
- Demonym: (in Spanish)
- Time zone: UTC−6 (CST)

Tatahuicapan de Juárez or Tatahuicapan is a municipality located in the south-east of the Mexican state of Veracruz. It was created in 1997 with an area of 208.06 km^{2}.

== Geography ==
The municipality of Tatahuicapan is delimited to the north, south and east by Mecayapan, and to the west by Soteapan. The rivers Tatahuicapán, Zapoapan, Piedra Labrada, Texizapan, and Temoloapan run through the region.

=== Climate ===
The weather in Tatahuicapan is typically warm all year round, with regular rains in summer and autumn.

== Celebrations ==
A celebration takes place in March in honour of San Gabriel, patron saint of the town, and another in December in honour of the Virgen de Guadalupe.
