= Sontecomapan Lagoon =

Coastal lagoon in Mexico

Designations

Ramsar Wetland
- Official name: Manglares y humedales de la Laguna de Sontecomapan
- Designated: 2 February 2004
- Reference no.: 1342

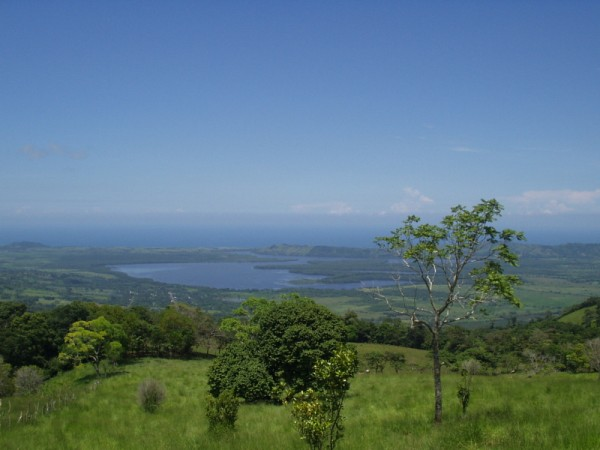
Laguna Sontecomapan, looking north from the Sierra de Los Tuxtlas. The Gulf of Mexico is in the distance.

Sontecomapan Lagoon (Laguna Sontecomapan also Laguna de Sontecomapan) occupies an alluvial plain in the center of the Sierra de Los Tuxtlas, 18°33′N 95°1′W, in southeast central Veracruz, east central Mexico on the edge of the Gulf of Mexico. The laguna is part of the Catemaco municipio stretching from the Gulf of Mexico to the foothills of the San Martin Tuxtla Volcano and the Sierra Santa Marta.

Tourism is concentrated on sightseeing the environmentally threatened mangroves of the laguna by rental lancha (boat) from the embarcadero (dock) in the village of Sontecomapan, watching kids dive at the shallow spring Poza de los Enanos and visiting the beaches of La Barra and Jicacal.

In 2004 Laguna Sontecomapan was designated as a Ramsar site.
