= Laguna Catemaco =

Freshwater lake near Catemaco, Veracruz, Mexico

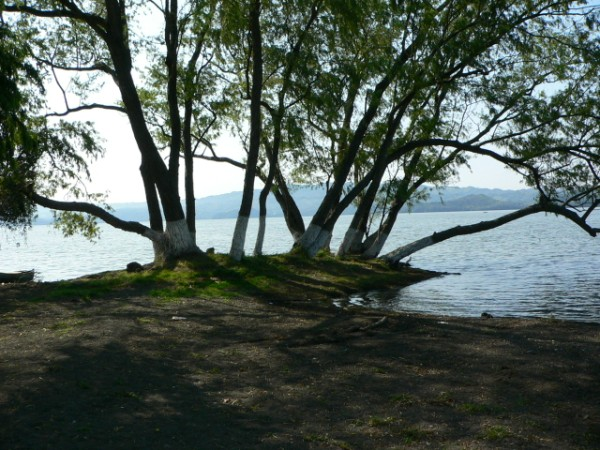

- Location within Veracruz
- Location: Catemaco Municipality, Veracruz
- Coordinates: 18°25′N 95°05′W
- Type: polymictic, eutrophic
- Primary outflows: Rio Grande de Catemaco (→San Juan River→Papaloapan River→Gulf of Mexico)
- Basin countries: Mexico
- Surface area: 72.54 km^{2} (28.01 sq mi)
- Average depth: 7.6 m (25 ft)
- Max. depth: 22 m (72 ft)
- Surface elevation: 340 m (1,120 ft)

Laguna Catemaco (Spanish: Laguna de Catemaco) is a freshwater lake located at the center of the Sierra de Los Tuxtlas in south central Veracruz near the city of Catemaco, in east central Mexico.

== Name ==
The word lagoon in English, and laguna in Spanish, generally describes a body of shallow brackish water, usually next to the sea. Thus despite the name, Laguna de Catemaco is not a lagoon, but an actual fresh water lake. Common usage in Mexico is Laguna de Catemaco, though scientific articles tend to use the correct and less ambiguous name of Lake Catemaco in English, and Lago Catemaco in Spanish.

== Hydrology ==
Laguna Catemaco was formed millennia ago, when lava flow from San Martin Tuxtla volcano blocked its current northern end, and stands now at 340 meters (1,120 ft) above sea level. It is shallow, averaging 7.6 meters (25 ft), with a maximum depth of 22 meters (72 ft) located in the channel between Isla Agaltepec and the city of Catemaco. The circulation pattern is clockwise. The laguna drains via the Rio Grande de Catemaco and its water level is controlled by several dams which replaced historic waterfalls. The change in water level is more than can be explained by evaporation and outflow. Apparently the laguna sits upon fissures permitting water to percolate down.

The Rio Grande de Catemaco is a tributary of the Papaloapan River, via the San Juan River. Eyipantla Falls (Salto de Eyipanlta) is a 45-meter (148 ft) high waterfall on the Rio Grande, located 11 kilometers (6.8 mi) downstream from the lake.

The lake is polymictic (water turns over more than twice a year), well oxygenated, and contains excessive nutrients (eutrophic) because of fertilizer runoff from the neighboring farms and nurseries. Because of the excessive nutrients, Laguna Catemaco is one of the more productive lakes in Mexico, up to 1,800 tons annually. Large netting is prohibited to assure the livelihood of more than a thousand registered fishermen. A perch-like fish called Oreochromis aureus was introduced from Africa, while a sardine like Topote, and the snail Tegogolo are the most common catches.

== Ecology ==
According to Miller and Conner (1997) there are 14 species of fish in Lake Catemaco. Two species, Micropterus salmoides Lacepède and Oreochromis aureus Steindachner have been introduced into the lake, and another two species, Vieja fenestrata Günther and Ophisternon aenigmaticum Rosen & Greenwood, are widespread throughout eastern Mexico and Central America. Of the remaining 10 species, five are endemic to the lake and five may represent undescribed species endemic to the lake (Miller and Conner 1997, Meyer and Schartl 2003).

Endemic species include the Catemaco characin (Bramocharax caballeroi), Heterandria tuxtlaensis, Catemaco molly (Poecilia catemaconis), Catemaco livebearer (Poeciliopsis catemaco), and Xiphophorus milleri. Non-endemic native fish species include Pseudoxiphophorus bimaculatus and Xiphophorus hellerii.

Biologically, Eyipantla Falls effectively isolates the rest of the Papaloapan basin from the lake. The high rate of endemicity suggests that Lake Catemaco has been biogeographically isolated for some time, possibly since its origin up to 2 million years ago.

== Fishery ==
Because of the excessive nutrients, Laguna Catemaco is one of the more productive lakes in Mexico, up to 1,800 tons annually. Large netting is prohibited to assure the livelihood of more than a thousand registered fishermen. Blue tilapia (Oreochromis aureus), a perch-like fish, was introduced from Africa, while a sardine-like Topote, and the snail Tegogolo are the most common catches.

== Geology ==
Laguna Catemaco has a surface area of 72.54 km^{2} (28.01 sq mi), is formed like an elliptical parabola and is almost square with maximum width and axis of a little more than 10 km (6.2 mi), (10,250-meter [33,630 ft] width and a WSW-ENE axis of 12,320 meters [40,420 ft]). It contains 552,000,000 cubic meters (448,000 acre⋅ft) of water. The laguna is Mexico's eighteenth in size of water bodies, seventh in size of lakes and lagunas, third in size of lakes.

Prevailing climate is hot and humid with average temperature of 23.4 °C (74.1 °F). Rainfall varies seasonally with averages of 206.8 cm (81.4 in) recorded at Catemaco and 461.4 cm (181.7 in) at Coyame. Winds from the Gulf of Mexico enter the Catemaco watershed through an opening in the surrounding mountains located to the north of the town of Coyame, and cross the lake in a NE-SW direction, blowing strongly over the lake throughout the year. From February to October, northeast winds are dominant. Colder and faster northern winds blow from November to January.

The tropical rainforest that once covered all the watershed of the lake has been severely decimated in the last few decades. Consequently, sedimentation has greatly increased, affecting the clarity of its waters and if left uncontrolled will possibly fill in the lake in the far future.

The shoreline is irregular, with remnants of several volcanic cones and its perimeter is about 50 km (31 mi). The lake is almost completely circumnavigated by roads, except for a gap in the lake shore road at the Tepeyaga peninsula.

There are several volcanic islands within the lake. Several of these islands are stocked with native and imported monkeys as a University of Veracruz research project. This has led to more than 70 small boats scurrying tourists from Catemaco city across the lake to view the free ranging monkeys. The lake has been the backdrop for movies, including Sean Connery's Medicine Man.
