= Catemaco =

- City and municipal seat
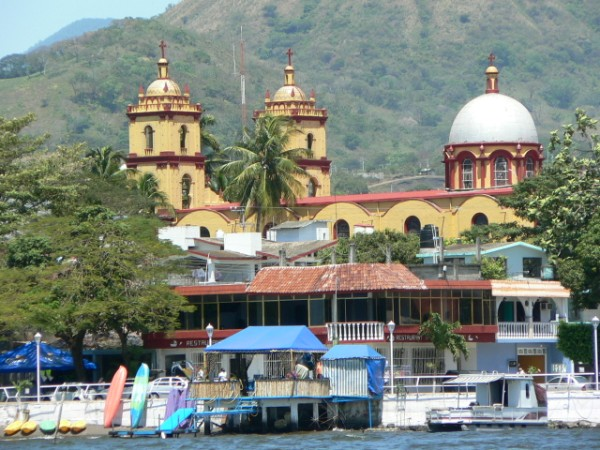
- Catemaco seen from the lake

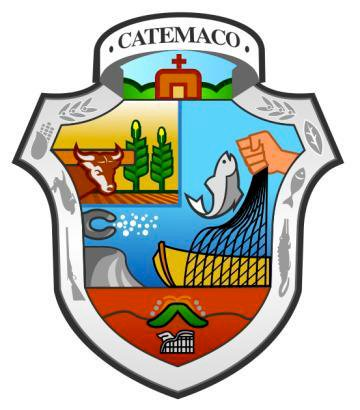
- Seal

- Location within Veracruz Location within Mexico
- Coordinates: 18°25′0″N 95°07′0″W
- Country: Mexico
- State: Veracruz
- Region: Los Tuxtlas
- Municipality: Catemaco
- Founded: 1774
- Declared city: 1966

Government
  - Municipal President: Jorge Alberto Gonzalez Azamar
- Elevation: 340 m (1,120 ft)

Population (2020)
  - Total: 28,655
  - Municipality: 49,451
- Time zone: UTC-6 (Central Standard Time)
- Postal code: 95870
- Area code: 294

Catemaco (Spanish: [kate'mako]) is a city in the south of the Mexican state of Veracruz. It serves as the municipal seat for the municipality of the same name. The city is located on Lake Catemaco, with the municipality stretching north to the Gulf of Mexico. Catemaco is a tourist destination, with its main attractions being the lake, remnants of the region's rainforest and a tradition of sorcery/witchcraft that has its roots in the pre-colonial period and is mostly practiced by men. This tradition is well-known in Mexico and attracts clients from various walks of life, including businessmen and national-level politicians. Catemaco holds an annual event in March dedicated to sorcery, which can draw up to 5,000 visitors.

== The city ==
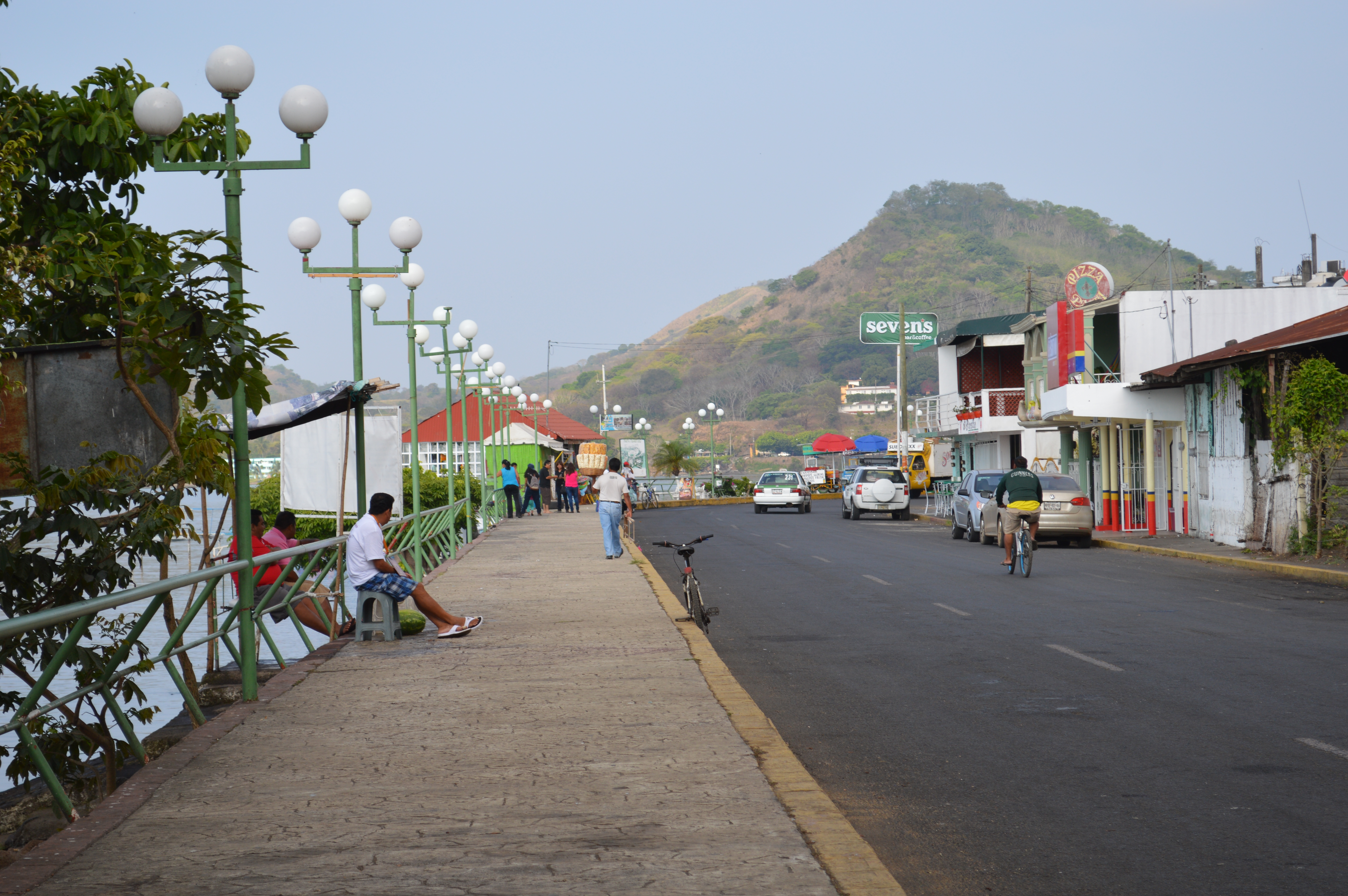
Breakwater/boardwalk along Lake Catemaco

The city of Catemaco is located in southern Veracruz, about 160 km from the port of Veracruz and 220 km from the state capital at Xalapa. It is located inland, extending 2.5 km along the shore of Lake Catemaco, a large freshwater lake, which is one of the city's main tourist attractions, along with its cuisine and its tradition of sorcery. Along the lake, the city has a 1.5 km breakwater/boardwalk, which is frequently crowded with both visitors and vendors, especially those selling charms and a local freshwater snail called tegogolo. The city's docks are located in the center of this area, classified as a fishing and tourism port by the federal government. Most of the boat traffic is for tourism, especially during vacation periods.

The other main section of the city is the main plaza, popular with both residents and visitors. The main structure here is the Basilica of Our Lady of Mount Carmel. Veneration of this version of the Virgin Mary, the patroness of the municipality, began in the early colonial period, as a substitute for the local worship of Chalchiuhtlicue, the goddess of water and fishermen. This basilica contains an image of Our Lady of Mount Carmel, which has been credited with miracles. It is rivaled in devotion only by a shrine on an island in Lake Catemaco called El Tegal, where the Virgin Mary is said to have appeared. The current structure was begun in 1799 but was not finished until 1961. The church is a combination of Baroque and Neoclassical with a cupola 21 meters high. The surrounding stained glass windows depict the lives of Jesus and Mary. Each year, Our Lady of Mount Carmel is celebrated at this basilica, a launching of boats in procession to Agaltepec Island and traditional music including danzón, Son Jarocho and other tropical music, using guitars, violins, the vihuela and double bass.

Other landmarks in the city include the Statue of the Fisherman, the Torre del Reloj (Clock Tower), the Brizuela Absalón House, the Gasca Blanco House and the Herrera García House. The Casa de los Tesoros is a large gift shop, which offers bagels, bizcochos and Mexican handcrafts and folk art.

There is a bus station principally connecting the city with the ports of Veracruz and Coatzacoalcos.

== The "witches" of Catemaco ==
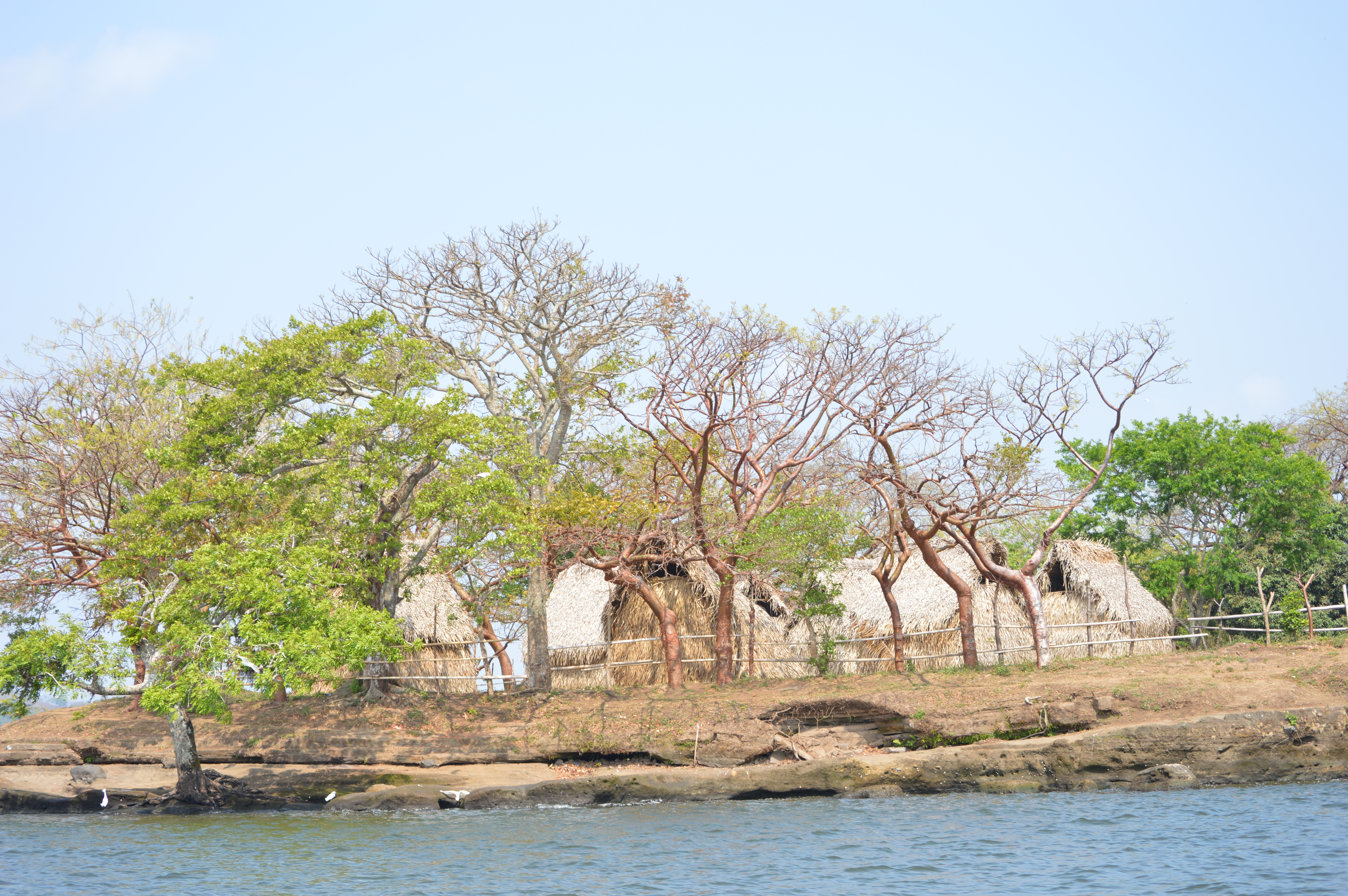
Grounds where the annual "brujo" reunion is held in Catemaco

Catemaco is known in Mexico for its community of brujos and brujas, which can be translated as 'witches' or 'sorcerers', as most are men but some are woman. The history of magical practices here extends back to the pre-Hispanic period and may have survived because of its relative isolation, but Lake Catemaco is said to emit a kind of energy, along with the Mono Blanco Mountain that rises above it.

These magical practices are an uneasy mix of Catholic rite, especially the invocation of saints and pre-Hispanic beliefs and rituals. Though many tourists are simply amused by the kitschy T-shirts of witches or other souvenirs or attractions, some do take the practice seriously. There are practitioners of both “white” and “black” magic, with the white version being more acceptable. Those who practice the black version charge more.

Sorcery is one of the main attractions of Catemaco. The belief in magical practices has attracted people from all walks of life, from waiters and taxi drivers to national-level politicians. Veracruz governor Fidel Herrera Beltrán even pushed for a national school for sorcery in Catemaco, without success and is a regular at the annual event. Visitors usually seek limpias (ritual cleansings), healing or something to give them an edge in business. These magical practices have also migrated out of the Catemaco area as residents move to other places such as Ciudad Juárez to work.

Although the sorcery is a main attraction, it is not promoted as part of Halloween or Day of the Dead. The main event for practitioners is the annual Congreso Nacional de Brujos de Catemaco (officially called the Ritos, Ceremonias y Artesanías Mágicas because of objections from the Catholic Church) . The main event is the opening, on the first Friday of March. This begins with a “black mass” held at midnight the night before, formerly held on the edge of Lake Catemaco by the “brujo mayor” (loosely translated as “high witch or sorcerer”), which has attracted up to 5,000 people. More recently this large public black mass has been replaced by private ceremonies held separately by each of the main brujos in the grounds of their own property. The next afternoon (on the first Friday of March) there is a public procession where each brujo and their followers process through the town, culminating in a public celebration involving traditional dance. The event was founded in the 1970s by former brujo mayor Gonzalo Aguirre and today attracts around 200 shamans, healers (curanderos), herbalists, psychics and fortune tellers. It also brings in as much as three million pesos to the local economy.

The popularity of the brujos and the event has created problems as well. Many con artists have taken advantage of the situation, making the finding of genuine practitioners difficult. There have been disputes among the practitioners over clients, tourism, and who leads the rites at the annual gathering. There has also been controversy related to those who sacrifice animals or petition Santa Muerte or the Devil.

== History ==
In the early pre Hispanic period, the area was dominated by the Olmecs, but the name is derived from Nahuatl, meaning "place of the burned houses". This name is probably in reference to an eruption of the San Martin Volcano. However, the assumed meaning “place of the burned houses” is grammatically impossible per Nahuatl. Consider Alexis Wimmer’s basic form ācaltēma to mean ‘load (something) into a boat’ to produce a derived but unattested form *[a]ca[l]tema[h]co ‘at the place where boats are loaded’. Another but less likely idea is that Catemaco is from Nahuatl cal-temactli ‘a house/houses that is/are given to someone’. Caltemaco would then be the nonactive form of the verb.

From the 16th century, the area was part of the province of Santiago Tuxtla, which became a municipality after Independence. The city itself was founded in 1774. In 1881, it officially became a town and in 1966 it was declared a city.
