= Veracruz =

State of Mexico

Veracruz Kuetlaxkoapan (Huasteca Nahuatl)
- State
- Free and Sovereign State of Veracruz de Ignacio de la Llave; Estado Libre y Soberano de Veracruz de Ignacio de la Llave (Spanish); Tlahtohcayotl Cuetlaxcoapan (Nahuatl)
- Coat of arms
- Motto: Plus Ultra (Beyond)
- Anthem: Himno Veracruzano
- State of Veracruz within Mexico
- Coordinates: 19°50′22″N 96°03′20″W
- Country: Mexico
- Capital: Xalapa-Enríquez
- Largest city: Heroica Veracruz
- Largest metro: Greater Veracruz
- Municipalities: 212
- Admission: December 22, 1823
- Order: 7th
- Founder: Hernán Cortés
- Seat: Palacio de Gobierno del Estado de Veracruz

Government
  - Governor: Rocío Nahle García
  - Senators: Raquel Bonilla Herrera (Note: Substitute for Claudia Tello Espinosa, who requested a leave from the Senate on November 26, 2024 to occupy the State's Secretariat of Education in the government of Rocío Nahle.); Manuel Huerta Ladrón de Guevara; Miguel Ángel Yunes Márquez (Note: After having voted in favor of president López Obrador's Judicial Reform, Senator Yunes was expelled from the PAN on September 11, 2024.)
  - Deputies: Federal deputies: • Armando Antonio Gómez Betancourt (1st); • María del Carmen Pinete Vargas (2nd); • Rocío Hernández Villanueva (3rd); • Rosa Hernández Espejo (4th); • Raquel Bonilla Herrera (5th); • Jaime Humberto Pérez Bernabé (6th); • Mónica Herrera Villavicencio (7th); • Natalia García Molina (8th); • José Francisco Yunes Zorrilla (9th); • Rafael Hernández Villalpando (10th); • Flora Tania Cruz Santos (11th); • María Josefina Gamboa Torales (12th); • Angélica Peña Martínez (13th); • Rosalba Valencia Cruz (14th); • Dulce María Corina Villegas Guarneros (15th); • Martha Rosa Morales Romero (16th); • Valentín Reyes López (17th); • Itzel Aleli Domínguez Zopiyactle (18th); • Paola Tenorio Adame (19th); • Esteban Bautista Hernández (20th)

Area
  - Total: 71,826 km^{2} (27,732 sq mi)
- Ranked 11th
- Highest elevation (Pico de Orizaba): 5,610 m (18,410 ft)

Population (2020)
  - Total: 8,062,579
  - Rank: 4th
  - Density: 112.25/km^{2} (290.73/sq mi)
  - Rank: 10th
- Demonyms: Veracruzano, -na (formal); Jarocho, -cha (colloquial)

GDP
  - Total: MXN 1.467 trillion (US$80.1 billion) (2024)
  - Per capita: US$9,900 (2024)
- Time zone: UTC−06:00 (CST)
- Postal code: 91–96
- Area code: Area codes: • 1; • 1; • 1; • 1; • 1
- ISO 3166 code: MX-VER
- HDI: ▲0.757 high Ranked 28th of 32
- Website: www.veracruz.gob.mx

Veracruz, (Note: Latin American Spanish: [beɾaˈkɾus]) officially the Free and Sovereign State of Veracruz de Ignacio de la Llave, (Note: Spanish: Estado Libre y Soberano de Veracruz de Ignacio de la Llave) is one of the 31 states that, along with Mexico City, comprise the 32 Federal Entities of Mexico. Located in eastern Mexico, it is bordered by seven states: Tamaulipas, San Luis Potosí, Hidalgo, Puebla, Oaxaca, Chiapas, and Tabasco. Veracruz is divided into 212 municipalities, and its capital city is Xalapa-Enríquez, commonly called just Xalapa.

Eastern Veracruz has a significant share of the coastline of the Gulf of Mexico. The state is noted for its mixed ethnic and Indigenous populations, and its cuisine reflects the many cultural influences that have come through the state because of the importance of the port of the city of Veracruz. In addition to Xalapa-Enríquez, the state's largest cities include Boca Del Río, Coatzacoalcos, Córdoba, Minatitlán, Orizaba, Poza Rica, and Veracruz.

== Etymology ==
The official name of the state is Veracruz de Ignacio de la Llave, named after its largest city and main port, Veracruz, which was originally founded as Villa Rica de la Vera Cruz (Rich Town of the True Cross) by Spanish conquistadores (conquerors) in 1519. The name Vera Cruz combines Latin and Spanish elements meaning "True Cross." The suffix is in honor of Ignacio de la Llave y Segura Zevallos (1818–1863), governor of Veracruz from 1855 to 1857 and once again from 1861 to 1863.

The state's official seal, adopted in 1954 by the state legislature through Law No. 92, is based on the colonial coat of arms granted by King Charles I of Spain to Villa Rica de la Vera Cruz in 1523, recognizing Veracruz as the first Spanish settlement in New Spain.

== History ==
=== Pre-Columbian ===
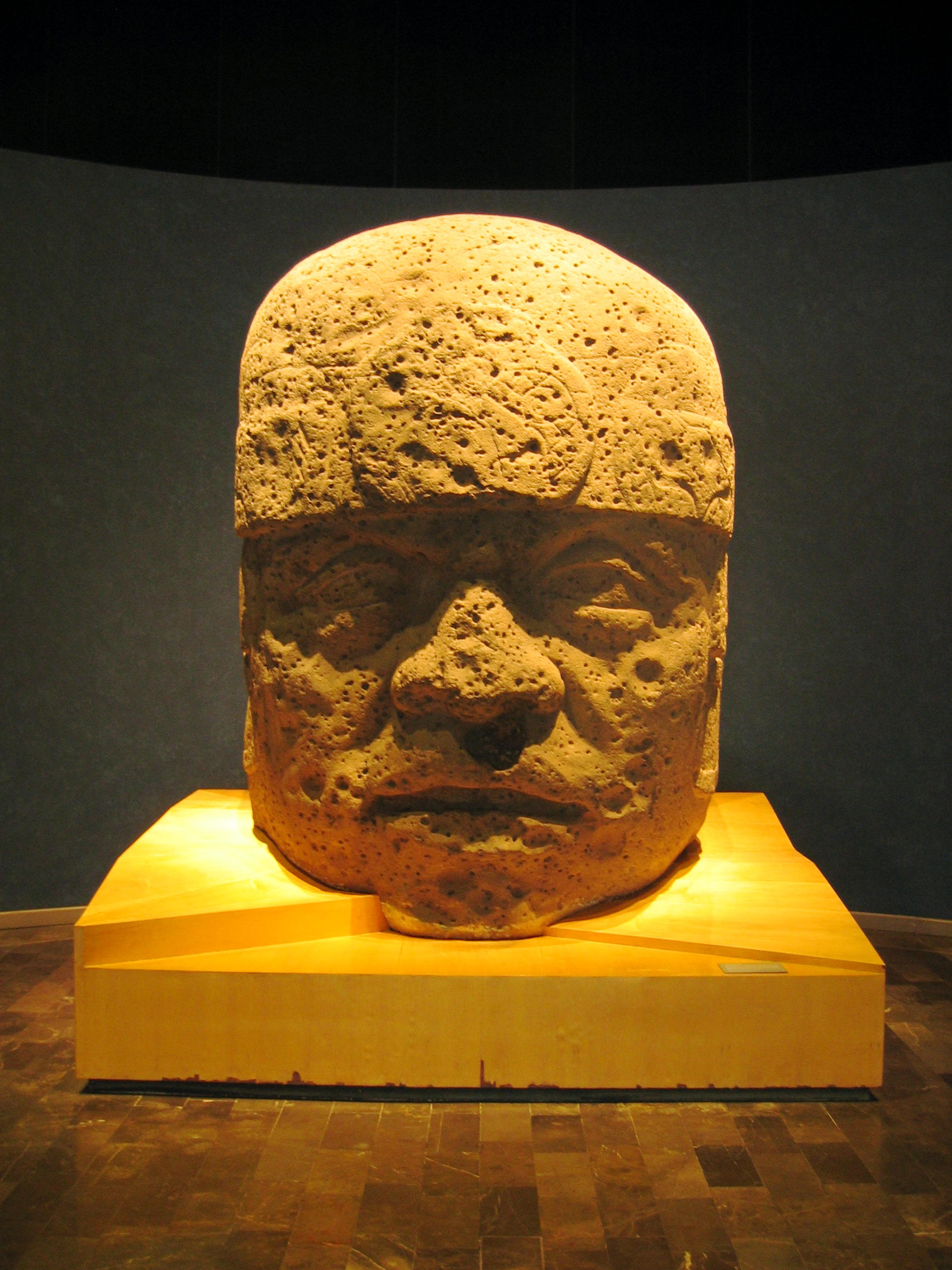
Colossal Olmec stone head from around 900 BC

During the pre-Columbian era, Veracruz was populated mainly by four Indigenous groups: the Huastecs and Otomis in the north, the Totonacs in the center north, and the Olmecs in the south. Archaeological remains of these civilizations are preserved at sites including Cempoala, Castillo de Teayo, El Tajín, El Zapotal, Las Higueras, Quiahuiztlan, Pánuco, San Lorenzo Tenochtitlán, and Tres Zapotes.

The first major civilization in the territory of the current state was that of the Olmecs, centered in the Coatzacoalcos River region. Its principal ceremonial site was San Lorenzo Tenochtitlán, with other important centers including Tres Zapotes in the city of Veracruz and La Venta in Tabasco. Olmec civilization reached its peak about 2,600 years ago, producing colossal stone heads that remain its most recognizable artistic achievement. These ceremonial sites were among the most complex of their era, leading many anthropologists to regard the Olmecs as the "mother culture" of Mesoamerican civilizations. Nevertheless, historian John Schmal notes that by 300 BCE, the Olmecs had been "eclipsed by other emerging civilizations in Mesoamerica."

The Totonacs, who continue to exist as a distinct group today, traditionally inhabited a region known as Totonacapan, located between the Cazones and Papaloapan Rivers in northern Veracruz. Pre-Columbian Totonacs subsisted on hunting, fishing, and agriculture, cultivating maize, beans, chili peppers, and squash.Vanilla beans are also native to the region. Characteristic artifacts include clay sculptures depicting smiling faces. El Tajín, located near Papantla, is a major Totonac archaeological site; however, the culture reached its peak at Cempoala, situated about five miles (8.0 km) inland from the modern port of Veracruz, before falling under Aztec control. At the time of the Spanish arrival in 1519, the Totonac population numbered approximately 250,000, distributed across 50 settlements and speaking four dialects, with about 25,000 inhabitants in Cempoala alone.

The Huastecs traditionally inhabited the far north of Veracruz, and still do, extending into Tamaulipas, Hidalgo, San Luis Potosí, Querétaro, and Puebla. Their language and agricultural practices are similar to those of the Maya, but only limited architectural and ceramic remains survive from the early Huastec culture. The civilization reached its height between 1200 and 1519 CE, prior to Spanish conquest.

During the 15th and early 16th centuries, the Aztecs established control over much of Veracruz, dividing the territory into the tributary provinces of Cempoallan, Cuetlaxtlan, Misantla, Quauhtochco, Tochtepec, Tlatlauhquitepec, and Xalapan. They valued the region for its vegetation and crops such as cedar, fruit, cotton, cacao, maize, beans, and vanilla. The Huastecs were incorporated into the provinces of Atlan and Tochpan. Due to frequent Totonac resistance to Aztec rule, however, rulers from Axayacatl in 1480 to Moctezuma II in the early 1500s were forced to dispatch troops to suppress uprisings.

=== Colonial period, 1519–1821 ===
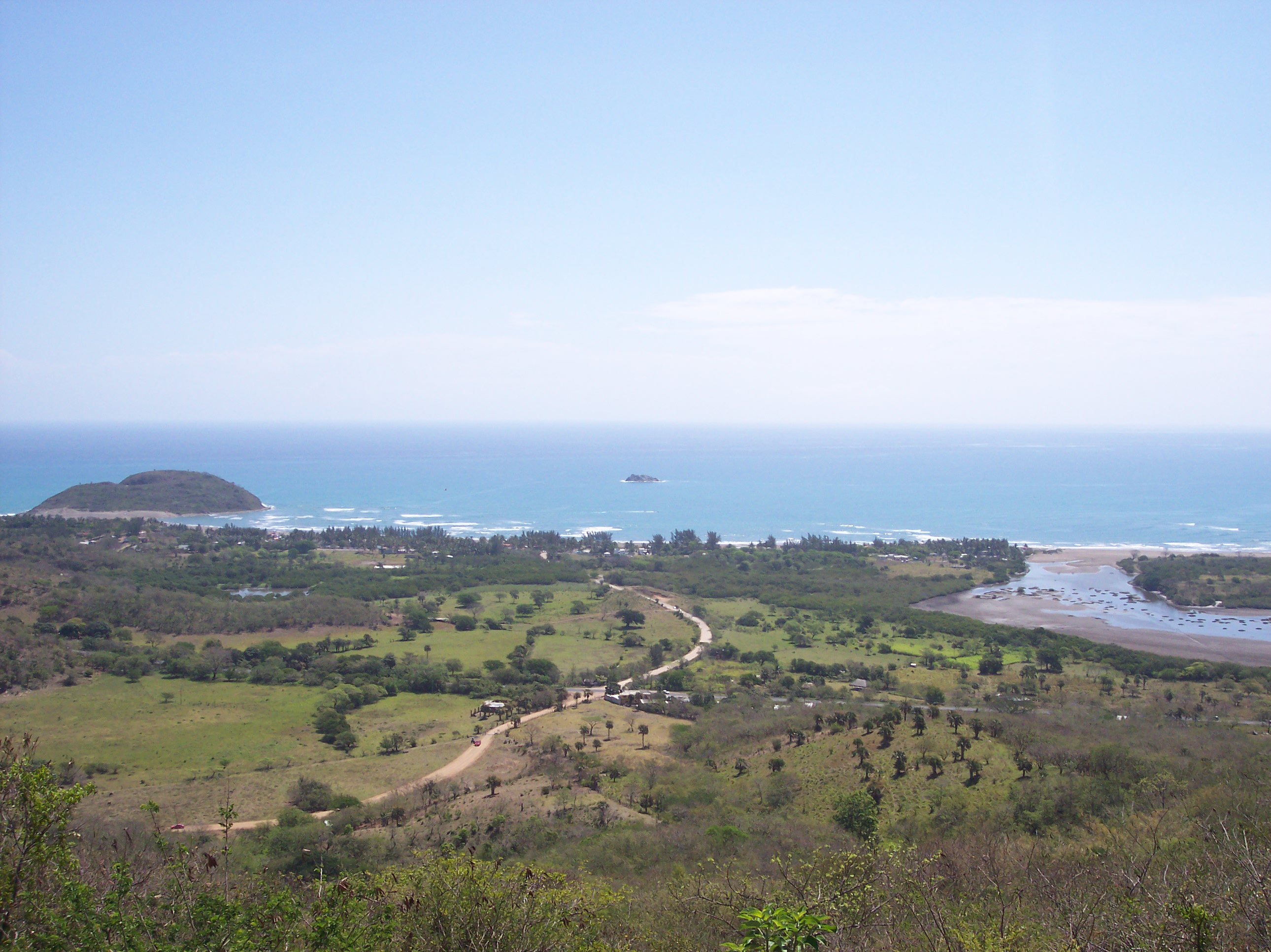
Playa Villa Rica (Villa Rica Beach), where the Spanish built the first city of Veracruz

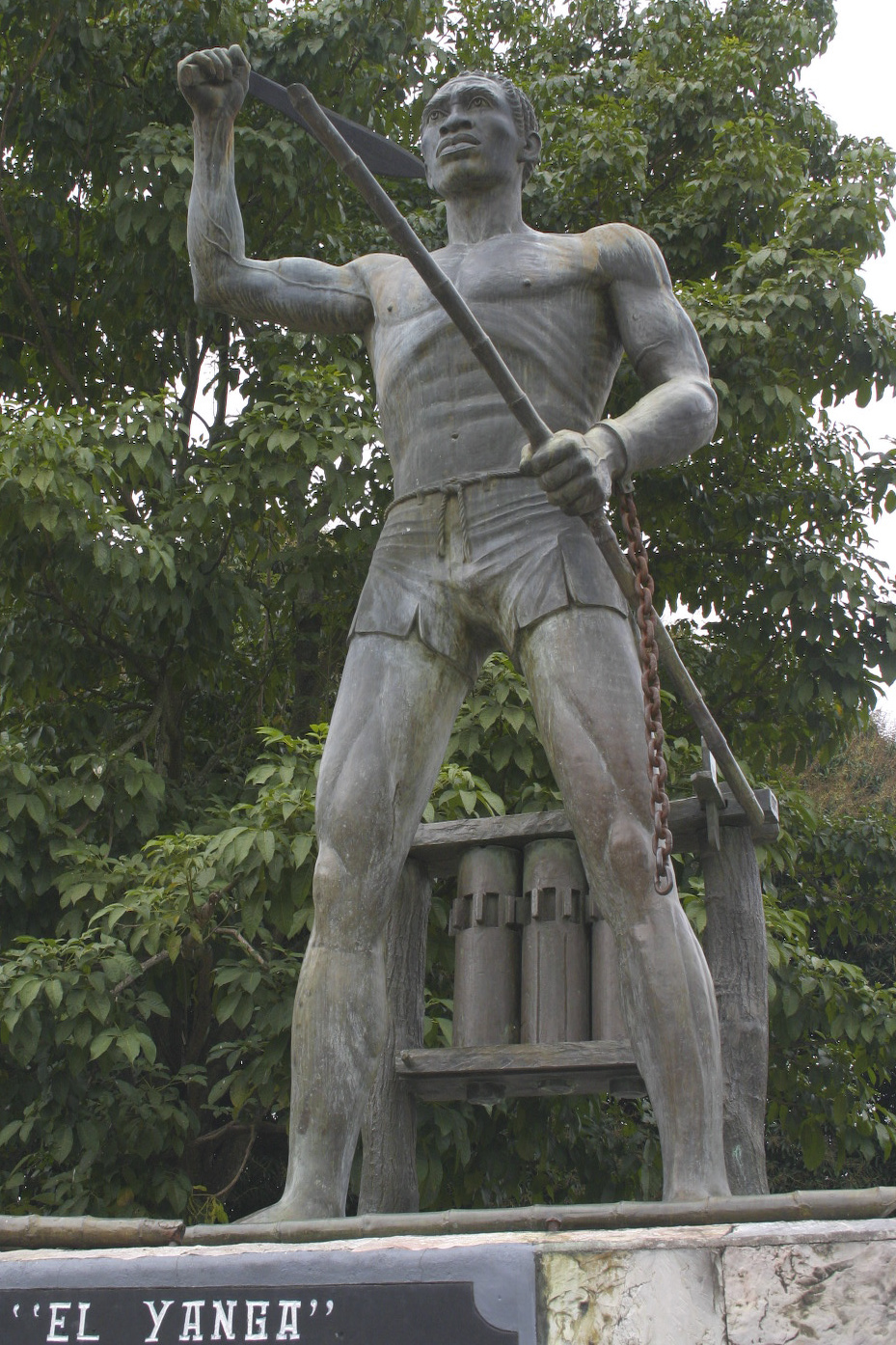
Statue of rebel leader Gaspar Yanga, a fugitive slave

Veracruz played an important part in the Spanish conquest of the Aztec Empire by Hernán Cortés and his expedition members. They founded Villa Rica de la Vera Cruz on May 18, 1519, as the first Spanish town in what is now Mexico. By doing so, Cortés overthrew the authority of the governor of Cuba, Diego Velázquez, claiming authority directly from the Spanish Crown. A small contingent of the expedition remained at Veracruz, but the main body of conquerors moved inland.

Among the first groups encountered by the Spanish in the Americas were the Totonacs. Juan de Grijalva was the first Spaniard to make contact with them near present-day Veracruz. Seeking to free his people from Aztec rule, Totonac ruler Tlacochcalcatl offered conquistador Cortés 50,000 warriors to take Tenochtitlan. With Spanish assistance, the Totonacs expelled Aztec tax collectors and took over some Aztec outposts. The city of Veracruz was established as the first Spanish-controlled municipality on the coast. Cortés then advanced towards Tenochtitlan, initiating the Spanish conquest. As Cortés's campaign progressed, certain Totonac factions sided with the Spanish, but the Huastecs, also under Aztec rule, resisted Cortés's forces. After the Aztecs were defeated at Tenochtitlan, Cortés sent a unit to conquer the Huastecs as well.

During the early conquest era, Cortés established encomiendas (literally "parcels" but in actual meaning, "forced labor grants"), which rewarded the conquerors with the labor of conquered Indigenous people. The Indigenous ruler of a settlement was charged with mobilization of labor and tribute owed to the holder of the encomienda. Multiple encomiendas were established in Veracruz, which changed ownership over time but early on came under the direct control of the Spanish Crown rather than individual encomenderos.

During the Colonial Era, Veracruz was the main port of entry for immigrants from Spain, enslaved Africans, and luxury goods for import and export. The first group of Franciscans arrived in Veracruz in 1524, walking barefoot to the capital of the Spanish colony of New Spain. The route between Veracruz and the Spanish capital of Mexico City, built on the site of the Aztec capital Tenochtitlan, was the key trade route during the colonial era.

Much of the state's history is involved with the port city of the same name founded by Cortés in 1519. Veracruz became the principal, and often only, port to export and import goods between the colony of New Spain and Spain itself. To ensure the port's monopoly, Veracruz established control over almost all of New Spain's Gulf coastline. New Spain's silver and cochineal red dye were the two most important exports from the port, along with chocolate, vanilla, and chili peppers. Imports included livestock (sheep, cows, goats, horses), wheat and other cultivars. Slaves, pineapple, and sugar cane were introduced from the Caribbean. Such valuable trade made the port a highly prized target for pirates during the Colonial Period, resulting in frequent attacks and sackings. This led to the building of the fort of San Juan de Ulúa, a site Juan de Grijalva visited in 1518, and the fortification of the city overall.

Much of Totonac and Huastec culture has survived the colonial period into the present day, largely due to northern Veracruz's rugged terrain and thick vegetation and lack of resources that the Spanish sought. Veracruz is considered to be where the mestizo or mixed European/Indigenous ethnicity began, which is a large part of Mexican cultural identity.

Arriving with the Spanish conquerors, new diseases made their first appearance in the continent. European diseases decimated the native population of the state, prompting the importation of enslaved Africans during the Colonial Period, starting in the 16th century. The Spanish imported between 500,000 and 1,000,000 West African slaves into Mexico between 1535 and 1767. As New Spain had no laws prohibiting interracial marriage, miscegenation between Indigenous and African populations began almost immediately. People of this mixed heritage are called Afro-Mestizo, which includes all three ethnicities: Indigenous, African, and Spanish.

Runaway slaves (cimarrones) became problematic to public order because they frequently formed robber bands that attacked travelers on highways. The Spanish Crown took action against these groups beginning in the late 16th century, but a major rebellion broke out in 1606 in the Villa Rica, Nueva Veracruz, Antón Lizardo, and Rio Blanco (White River) areas. The most consequential rebellion occurred in the Orizaba area, involving about 500 fugitive slaves. In 1609, Gaspar Yanga, a fugitive slave, led an insurrection against the Spanish. Unrest continued until 1618, when the Spanish government eventually signed an amnesty pact that gave the Africans the right to form their own community in exchange for suppressing bandit activity. The town of San Lorenzo de Zerral was established, later renamed the municipality of Yanga. Yanga's rebellion marked the first time slavery was abolished in the Americas.

In the first half of the 17th century, cities such as Córdoba, Orizaba, and Xalapa were established or expanded to safeguard the trade route between Mexico City and the port of Veracruz. During this time, the Spanish and mixed-ethnicities population increased as the purely Indigenous population continued to fall to a fraction of pre-Conquest levels—this time due to ethnic mixing rather than disease. Trade through Veracruz was restricted mainly to Spain, and only limited commerce permitted with England and other Spanish colonies until the Decreto de Libre Comercio (Decree of Free Commerce) authorized free trade within Spanish-held realms in 1778, opening up more of Europe. The reform increased the importance of the port and the prosperity of its inhabitants.

Beyond the port in other areas of the state, the economy was based on agriculture, livestock, and commerce. In 1720, Xalapa hosted its first trade fair, establishing the city as a key point of exchange between inland Mexican goods and foreign imports. This role contributed to iXalapa's later designation as the state capital.

In 1746, the state was divided into 14 civil jurisdictions: Córdoba, Cosamaloapan, Cotaxtla, Huayacocotla, Huauchinango, Jalacingo, Misantla, Pánuco, Papantla, Orizaba, Tampico, Tuxtla, Veracruz, and Xalapa.

In 1824, soldiers loyal to the Spanish Crown made their last stand against the independence movement at the port city of Veracruz and the fort of San Juan de Ulúa, where Cortés had landed 300 years earlier.

=== Independence ===
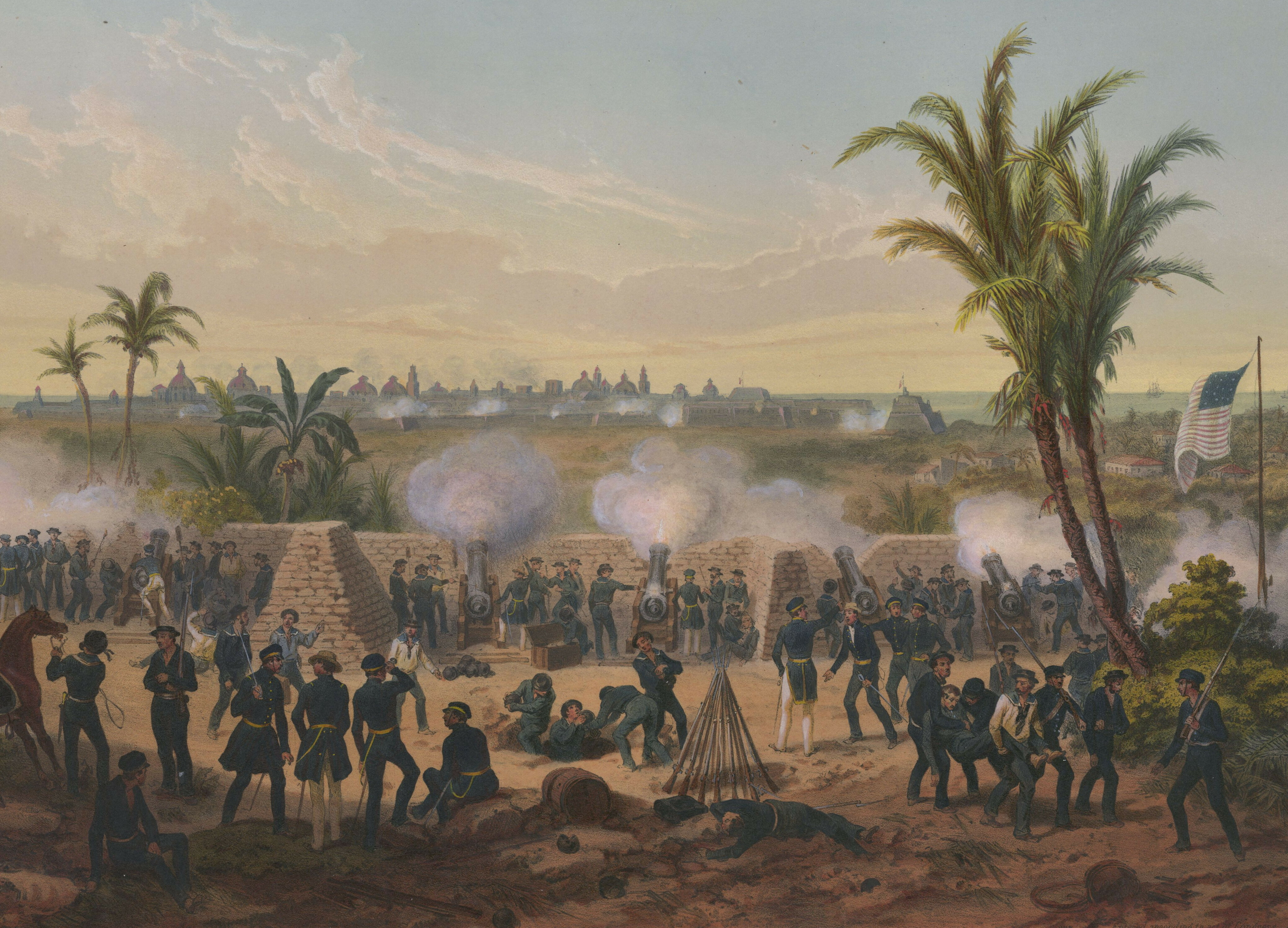
Depiction of the siege of Veracruz during the Mexican–American War

During the Mexican War of Independence, there was support for the insurgents in many parts of the state, with skirmishes erupting in various parts as early as 1811. A major conspiracy against the colonial government was discovered in the port in 1812, with rebels taking Ayahualulco and Ixhuacán during the same year, forcing royalist troops to withdraw to Xalapa. Eventually, this city and the port were cut off from Mexico City. Most of the state remained in rebel hands during the rest of the war, although the port's commercial class did not support the effort.

In 1821, Juan de O'Donojú, the last viceroy of New Spain, came to the port to leave for Spain. However, until 1823, Spanish troops continued to occupy San Juan de Ulúa Fort. In 1826, the city would receive the first of its four titles of "heroic city" for confronting these remaining Spanish troops.

Although the last of the Spanish held on in San Juan de Ulúa, Agustín de Iturbide had been declared emperor of Mexico in 1822. His reign quickly encountered resistance from those favoring a republican form of government, including from Antonio López de Santa Anna from his stronghold in Veracruz state. Months later, Iturbide went into exile and Santa Anna held nine terms as president.

The French intervened in Mexico through Veracruz for the first time in the 1838, in what became the Pastry War. The port was blockaded. Efforts to defend the country were coordinated from Xalapa. The port was bombarded, but eventually a settlement was reached.

During the Mexican–American War, the port was again blockaded, this time by the Americans. Initial American attempts in 1847 to land in Alvarado were checked, but the Americans then landed a few miles south of Veracruz, which surrendered after a 20-day siege; defeated General Santa Anna's forces at the Battle of Cerro Gordo; and marched inland through Xalapa towards Mexico City, led by General Winfield Scott. Mexico surrendered shortly after.

The municipalities of Tuxpan and Chicontepec belonged to Puebla until 1853, when they were annexed to Veracruz to give the state its final form. In 1855, the State Government Palace was constructed. During the Reform War, the major player was Ignacio de la Llave, whose name is part of the state's official designation. In 1858, the port became the site for the liberal government under Benito Juárez after he was forced out of Mexico City during the Reform War. Control of the port and its customs duties allowed liberal forces to gather resources. Conservative forces attacked the state but were repelled from both the port and Xalapa.

The Reform War devastated Mexico's economy, leaving it unable to repay its European debts. As a result, Juárez annulled the country's foreign debt, prompting Britain, Spain, and France to occupy the Mexican Gulf Coast in October 1861 to force repayment. Under normal conditions, this move would have been blocked by the United States under the Monroe Doctrine; however, the United States was occupied with a Civil War at the time, and the European powers believed that the Americans could not act. Spanish troops under General Manuel Gasset occupied the port of Veracruz without local resistance. Then, in November, the port was also occupied by British and French forces. The Spanish and the British withdrew after making deals with Juárez, but the French pushed on to establish the reign of Maximilian I of Mexico. However, this was short-lived and the French were expelled through Veracruz in 1866-1867.

In 1863, the state was officially named Veracruz-Llave. After the French were expelled, the state government was in the port of Veracruz. In 1878, the capital was transferred to Orizaba but later moved to Xalapa in 1885.

By the end of the century, many infrastructure improvements such as roads and railways—especially the Ferrocarril Interoceánico (Interoceanic Railway)—had been completed with the major cities being Veracruz, Orizaba, Xalapa, Córdoba, Jalacingo, Chicontepec and Tantoyuca. Discovery of oil in the north of the state attracted foreign firms, which brought machinery needed for its extraction. These companies included Huasteca Company Petroleum and El Aguila along with American and English firms. During the same time period, uprisings against the government under Porfirio Díaz in the agricultural south of the state were brutally repressed.

=== 20th century to the present ===
Unrest against Díaz's regime continued until the outbreak of the Mexican Revolution ousted him from power. The major event leading up to this war in Veracruz was the cigar-makers strike of 1905, when more than 5,000 workers of the El Valle Nacional company walked off the job. The governor, Teodoro A. Dehesa, unsuccessfully tried to negotiate a settlement. The strike went on for months until the strikers won. This victory encouraged more actions, until strikes at the factories in Rio Blanco, Nogales, Santa Rosa, and Contón de Orizaba resulted in dramatic violence in January 1907. No major battles of the Mexican Revolution were fought in the state, although there were skirmishes and attacks on the port. By 1914 the rebel Cándido Agular occupied a number of municipalities in the state and in 1917, Venustiano Carranza transferred the federal government there temporarily.

In April 1914, the Tampico Affair, which concerned US sailors in the city of Tampico, caused President Woodrow Wilson to send American troops to Veracruz for six months, following which Mexico severed diplomatic relations with the United States.

After the Revolution, agrarian reform, including the redistribution of land and the creation of ejidos (communal lands) took place. The oil companies in the north of the state were nationalized and consolidated into PEMEX in the 1930s by Lázaro Cárdenas. In the 1950s, more roads, such as the Mexico City-Poza Rica, Veracruz-Alvarado-Coatzacoalco, and Tinajas-Ciudad Aleman-Tlacoatalpan highways, were constructed and the Universidad Veracruzana (Veracruz University) expanded. In 1960, the Xalapa Museum of Anthropology was inaugurated as well as the Coatzacoalco-Salina Cruz highway. The Veracruz City International Airport was opened in the 1970s.

In the 10 years after 2006, at least 3,600 people have disappeared within the state and multiple mass graves have been found. They are viewed as connected with the over 28,000 individuals missing during the Mexican drug war. Within the state, the Gulf Cartel and Los Zetas have battled for control, which has led to journalists there being targeted and killed.

== Geography ==
=== Political geography ===
The state is a crescent-shaped strip of land wedged between the Sierra Madre Oriental (Eastern Sierra Madre) to the west and the Gulf of Mexico to the east. Its total area is 78,815 km^{2} (30,431 mi^{2}), accounting for about 3.7% of Mexico's total territory. It stretches about 650 km (403.9 mi) north to south, but its width varies from between 212 and 36 km (132 and 22 mi), with an average of about 100 km (62 mi) in width. Its coastline along the Gulf of Mexico extends for 690 km (429 mi).

Veracruz borders the states of Tamaulipas to the north; Chiapas and Oaxaca to the south; Tabasco to the southeast; and Hidalgo, Puebla, and San Luis Potosí to the west.

=== Natural geography ===
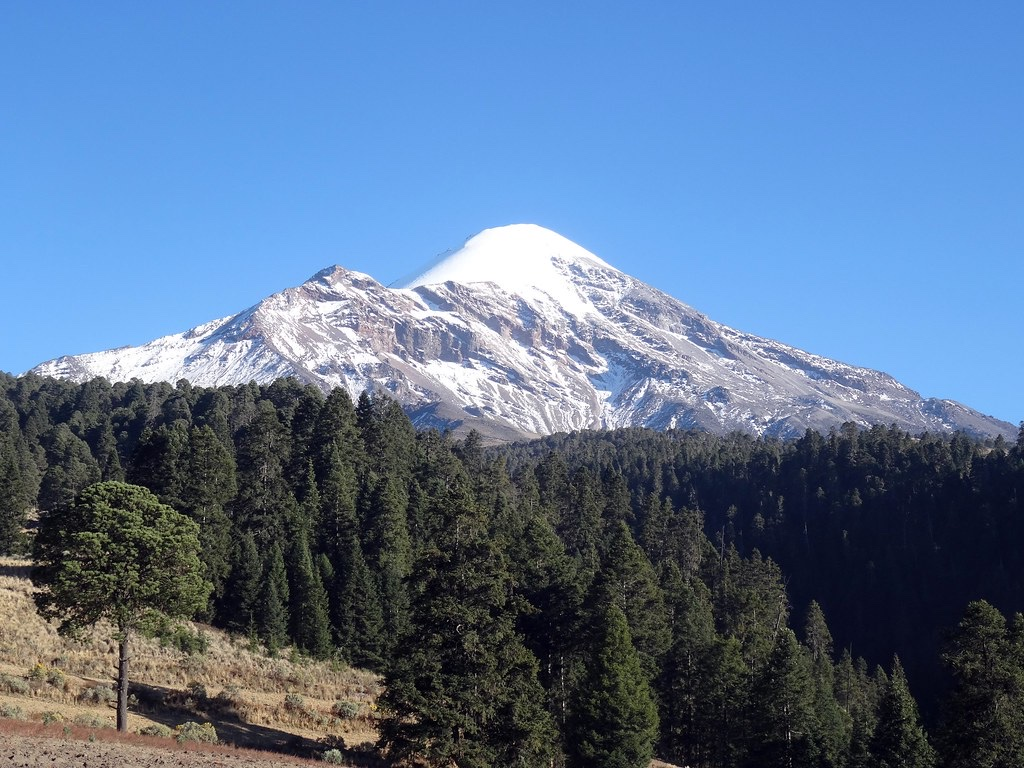
Citlaltépetl, the highest mountain in Mexico at 5,636 m (18,490.81 ft)

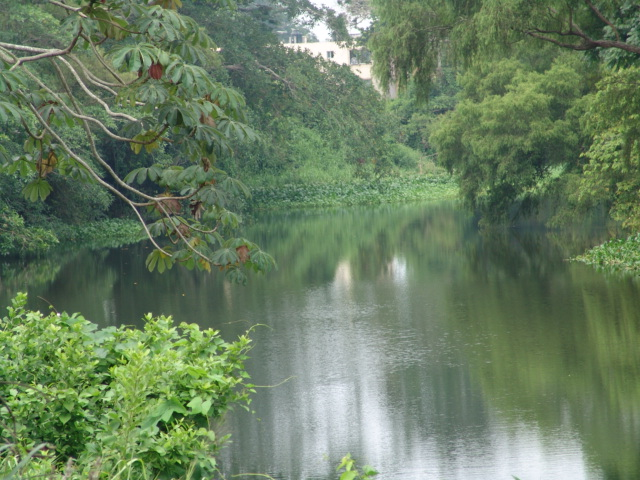
The Jamapa River

The state's natural geography can be categorized into nine regions: the Central Region; the Laguna de Alvarado Region; the Laguna del Castillo Region; the Metlac River area; the Pueblo Viejo-Tamiahua Region; the Sierra de Zongolica; the Tecolutla Region; and the Tuxtlas Region.

The topography of Veracruz changes drastically, rising from the narrow coastal plains to the highlands of the eastern Sierra Madre. Elevation varies from sea level to the Pico de Orizaba (Orizaba Peak), Mexico's highest peak, at 5,636 m (18,491 ft) above sea level. The coast is home to numerous tidewater streams and lagoons alternating with low strips of sand. Most of the long coastline is narrow and sandy with unstable dunes, small shifting lagoons, and points.

The mountains are of the Sierra Madre Oriental and the Trans-Mexican Volcanic Belt. Mountain ranges include the Sierra de Axocuapan; the Sierra de Chiconquiaco; the Sierra de Coxquihui; the Sierra de Huatusco; the Sierra de Huayacocotla; the Sierra de Jalacingo; the Sierra de Los Tuxtlas; the Sierra de Otontepec; the Sierra de Topila; and the Sierra de Zongolica. Major peaks include the Cofre de Perote (Perote’s Coffer) (4,282 m; 14,048.6 ft); the Cerro de Tecomates (Tecomates Hill) (3,227 m; 10,587 ft); the Cerro del Vigía Alta (High Watch Hill) (3,055 m; 10,023 ft); the Cerro de 3 Tortas (Three Cake Hill) (2,997 m; 9,833 ft); and the Pico de Orizaba (5,636 m; 18,491 ft)—of which the Pico de Orizaba is covered in snow year round and the Cofre de Perote in winter. Major valleys include the Acultzingo; the Córdoba, the Maltrata; the Orizaba; and the San Andrés.

Veracruz has over 40 rivers and tributaries, which transport rich silt from the state's highlands to its coastal regions and valleys and also provide water for hydroelectric power and irrigation. All rivers and streams that cross the state begin in the Sierra Madre Oriental or in the Central Mesa, flowing eastward to the Gulf of Mexico. The important rivers include the Actopan; the Acuatempan; the Río Blanco; the Cazones; the Coatzacoalcos; the Río de La Antigua; the Ayyappan; the Jamapa; the Nautla; the Pánuco; the Papaloapan; the Tecolutla; the Tonalá; the Tuxpan; and the Xoloapa. The largest rivers in terms of water discharge are the Coazocoalcos; the Pánuco; the Papaloapan; the Tuxpan; and the Uxpanapa—of which all but the Uxpanapa are navigable. Two of Mexico's most polluted rivers, the Coatzacoalcos and the Río Blanco, are located in Veracruz. Much of the pollution comes from industrial sources, but discharge of sewage and uncontrolled garbage disposal are also major contributors. The state has very few sewage treatment plants, with only 10% of sewage being treated before discharge.

The state has only one significant lake: Lake Catemaco, but there also 10 major waterfalls and 10 major coastal lagoons.

Offshore islands include Isla del Ídolo (Idol Island); Isla Frijoles (Bean Island); Isla de Lobos (Wolf Island); Isla de los Burros (Donkey Island); Isla de Sacrificios (Island of Sacrifices); Isla de Salmendina (Salmendina Island); Isla del Toro (Bull Island); Isla Juan A. Ramírez (Juan A. Ramírez Island); Isla Pajaros (Bird Island); and Isla Terrón (Terrón Island). Ocean reefs include Anegada de Adento; Anegada de Afuera; Blanquilla; Cabezo; Gallega; Gualleguilla; Medio; Tangüillo; and Tuxpan.

=== Major communities ===
- Acayucan
- Alvarado
- Boca del Río
- Camarón de Tejeda
- Catemaco
- Coatepec
- Coatzacoalcos
- Córdoba
- El Jícaro, Veracruz
- Martínez de la Torre
- Minatitlán
- Orizaba
- Papantla (Papantla de Olarte)
- Poza Rica
- Santiago Tuxtla
- San Andrés Tuxtla
- Tuxpan (Túxpam/Túxpam de Rodríguez Cano)
- Veracruz
- Xalapa (Xalapa-Enríquez)

==== Localities ====
- La Martucha
- Rinconada

=== Climate ===
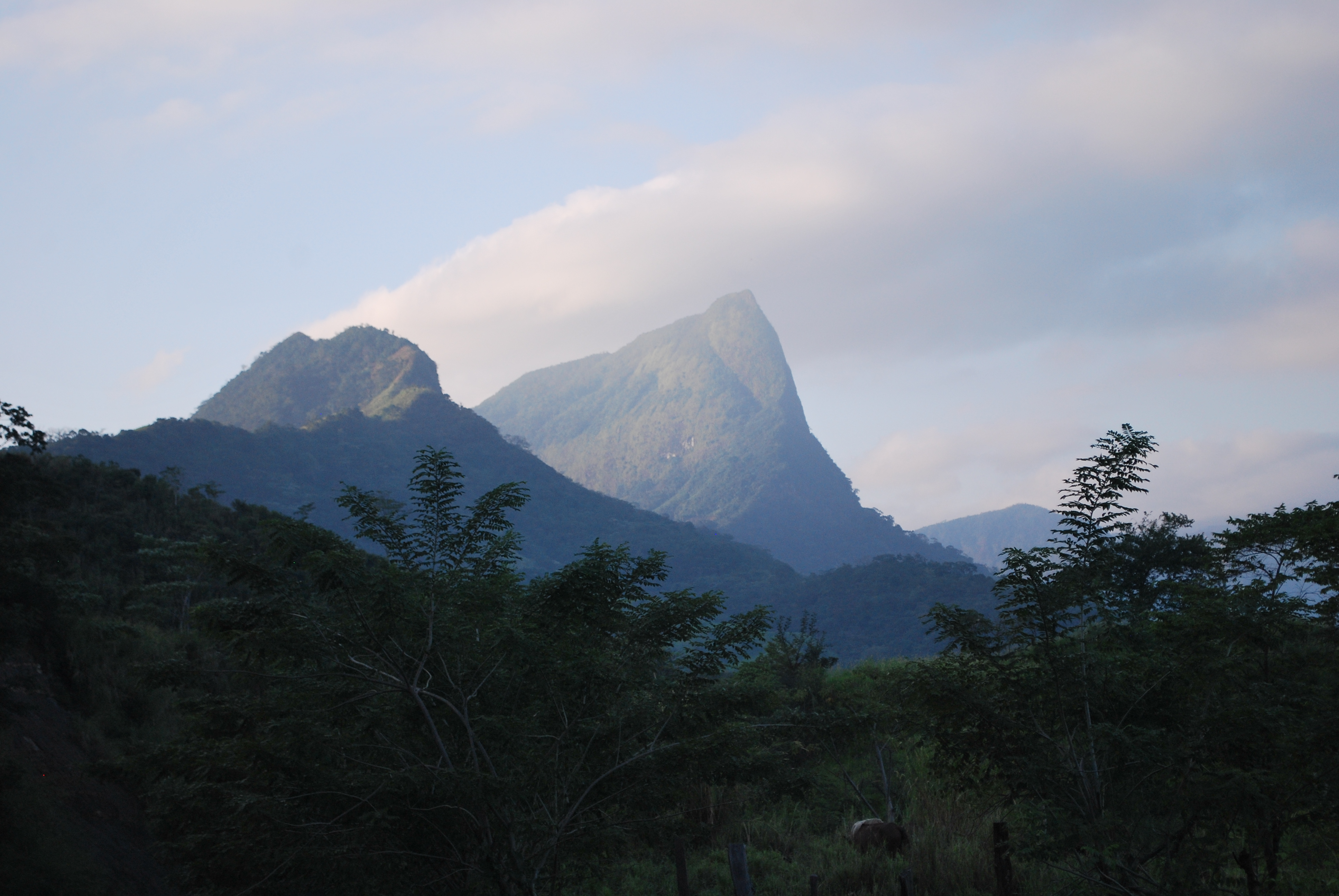
Mountain formation in southern Veracruz

Veracruz

Climate chart (precipitation, max. and min. temperature)
| J | F | M | A | M | J | J | A | S | O | N | D |
| 50 24 14 | 32 28 16 | 18 28 16 | 48 31 19 | 73 33 21 | 308 29 20 | 250 29 19 | 125 31 21 | 387 28 20 | 204 27 18 | 54 25 14 | 36 25 14 |
- █ Average max. and min. temperatures in °C
- █ Precipitation totals in mm
- Source: Comisión Nacional del Agua
Imperial conversion
| J | F | M | A | M | J | J | A | S | O | N | D |
| 2 75 57 | 1.3 82 61 | 0.7 82 61 | 1.9 88 66 | 2.9 91 70 | 12 84 68 | 9.8 84 66 | 4.9 88 70 | 15 82 68 | 8 81 64 | 2.1 77 57 | 1.4 77 57 |
- █ Average max. and min. temperatures in °F
- █ Precipitation totals in inches

The large variation of altitude results in a wide mixture of climates, ranging from cold, snow-topped mountain peaks to hot, humid tropical areas on the coast. Thirty-two percent of the state is classified as hot and humid; 52% as hot and semi humid; 9% as warm and humid; 6% as temperate and humid; and 1% as cold.

Hot/humid and hot/semi-humid climates dominate from sea level to about 1,000 m (3,281 ft) above sea level. Average annual temperature ranges from 22 to 26 °C (72 to 79 °F), with precipitation varying from 2,000 mm (79 in) to just over 3,500 mm (138 in) per year.

Cooler and humid climates are found at elevations between 1,000 and 1,600 m (3,281 and 5,249 ft), with an average temperature between 18 and 22 °C (64 and 72 °F) and precipitation varying between 2,000 and 2,500 mm (79 and 98 in).

Temperate climates are found at higher altitudes, between 1,600 and 2,800 m (5,249 and 9,186 ft), with temperatures varying from 12 to 18 °C (54 to 64 °F) and precipitation even more—between 500 and 2,500 mm (20 and 98 in).

Cold climates are found at the highest elevations, reaching up to the Cofre de Perote and the Pico de Orizaba.

There is also a small semiarid region around the city of Perote and west of the Huasteca area, due to a rain shadow caused by the Trans-Mexican Volcanic Belt and the Sierra Madre Oriental that prevent the flow of moist Gulf air to this region.

=== Ecosystems ===
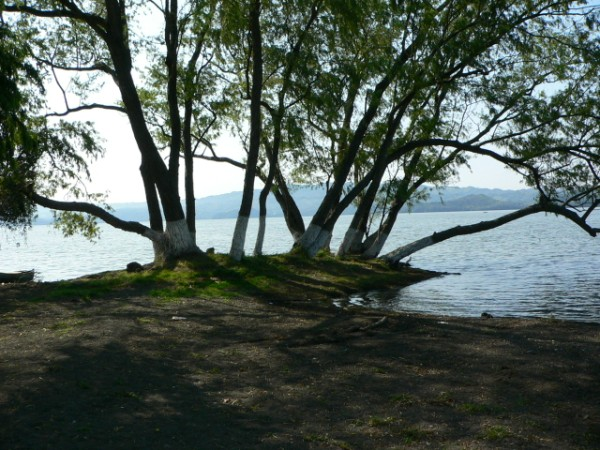
Shore of Lake Catemaco

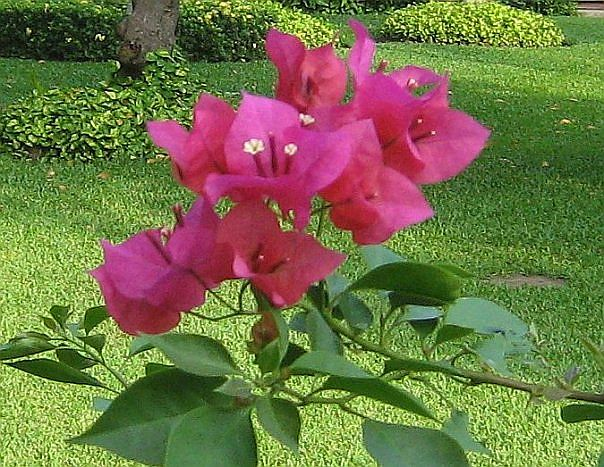
Bougainvillea

The state's ecology is of great importance for many plant and animal species. It is a center of plant endemism and also has two separate endemic bird areas.

Various types of forest cover the state, dominated by evergreen tropical forest. The northern part of the state and higher mountain areas are convergence zones between lowland evergreen tropical forests and more temperate flora and fauna. It is also the northernmost location of subhumid tropical forest in Mexico, although little of it remains, and mostly on steep slopes. The tropical forests of the Veracruz moist forests ecoregion are situated in the northeastern coastal plain and extend into southern Tamaulipas state, on the east side of the Sierra Madre Oriental. The soils here are volcanic and shallow, but with rich organic matter. Predominant species include Mayan breadnut (Brosimum alicastrum); sapodilla (Manilkara zapota); rosadillo (Celtis monoica); gumbo-limbo (Bursera simaruba); white gumbo-limbo (Dendropanax arboreus); and tempisque (Sideroxylon capiri). This ecoregion extends into the central part of the state, with vegetation changing to include mahogany (Swietenia macrophylla); sapodilla (Manilkara zapota); red poinsettia tree (Bernoullia flammea); and glassywood (Astronium graveolens). In the central part of the state, the Veracruz dry forests extend from the Sierra to the coast, south of the Sierra de Chiconquiaco. The Petén–Veracruz moist forests occupy the southern part of the state, extending eastward through neighboring Chiapas and Tabasco states into Guatemala.

Veracruz is described as one of the richest varieties of wildlife in the Western Hemisphere. There is a diverse array of endemic insects like the giant silkworm moth (Arsenura armida). The state is also known for its many arachnids, including over 25 species of tarantula (Theraphosidae), of which many are endemic.

The state is part of Birdlife International's Endemic Bird Area (EBA) project, including the green-cheeked amazon (Amazona viridigenalis); the Tamaulipas crow (Corvus imparatus); the Altamira yellowthroat (Geothlypis flavovelata); and the crimson-collared grosbeak (Rhodothraupis celaeno). Despite much deterioration of the forest areas, Veracruz is still an important stopover for migratory birds.

Wildlife species includes 102 mammal, 49 amphibian, 109 reptilian, 561 bird, and more. Species in danger of extinction include the jaguar, the spider monkey, and the anteater. Many endangered mammal species can be found here, including two endemic rodents (Peromyscus ochraventer and Neotoma angustapalata); the jaguar (Panthera onca); the ocelot (Leopardus pardalis); the jaguarundi (Herpailurus yaguarondi); and the white-nosed coati (Nasua narica). The endangered Baird's tapir may occasionally be spotted in the state's southern jungle regions, such as Biósfera Los Tuxtlas. This region is also the northernmost extent of the primate mantled howler (Alouatta palliata).

Most of Veracruz's native forests have been destroyed and replaced by scrub and secondary communities of trees. From 1900 to 1987, over 18,553 km^{2} (7,163.4 mi^{2}) of forest were logged, resulting in loss of habitat and biodiversity. Much of the logging is for commercial timber, the search for tropical hardwoods, and the clearing of land for local farmers, especially for cattle grazing. Only 20% of the state's original ecosystem remains, with 64% transformed by human exploitation. Despite some efforts at conservation and reclamation, exploitation continues to put pressure on remaining wild areas.

The state has 31 environmentally protected areas in 21 different municipalities. Nine are urban parks; three are national parks (Pico de Orizaba, Cofre de Perote, and San José de los Molinos). The Cofre de Perote National Park, created in 1937, is 11,700 hectares (19,027.1 acres) of pine and oyamel (a species of conifer) forest. The Los Tuxtlas Biosphere Reserve covers the municipalities of Ángel R. Cabada, Catemaco, Mecayapan, Pajapan, San Andrés Tuxtla, Santiago Tuxtla, Soteapan, and Tatahuicapan for a total of 155,122 hectares (383,314.8 acres). It contains various volcanoes, such as San Martín and Santa Marta, and rich biodiversity as it stretches from sea level to higher elevations, with 16 climate regions grouped into four climate types.

Forest types range from evergreen tropical rainforest to pine. Seventy-five percent of the species here are also found in Central America and there is a total of 2,368 plant species. Some—such as Costus dirzoi; Daphnopsis megacarpa; Eugenia sotoesparzae; Inga sinacae; Miconia ibarrae; Mormodes tuxtlensis; and Thelypteris rachyflexuosa—are native only to this area.

The Veracruz Reef System—mostly off the coast of the city of Veracruz, Boca del Río, and Alvarado—is also considered a national park. The area includes coral reefs, seaweed beds, and other marine vegetation, covering an area of 52,239 hectares (129,085.4 acres). There are 17 reefs in total, some of which jut above the surface to form small islands. This system links with the reef systems of Campeche and Yucatán.

== Economy ==
Veracruz has one of Mexico's leading economies, based on agriculture and petroleum.

=== Agriculture ===
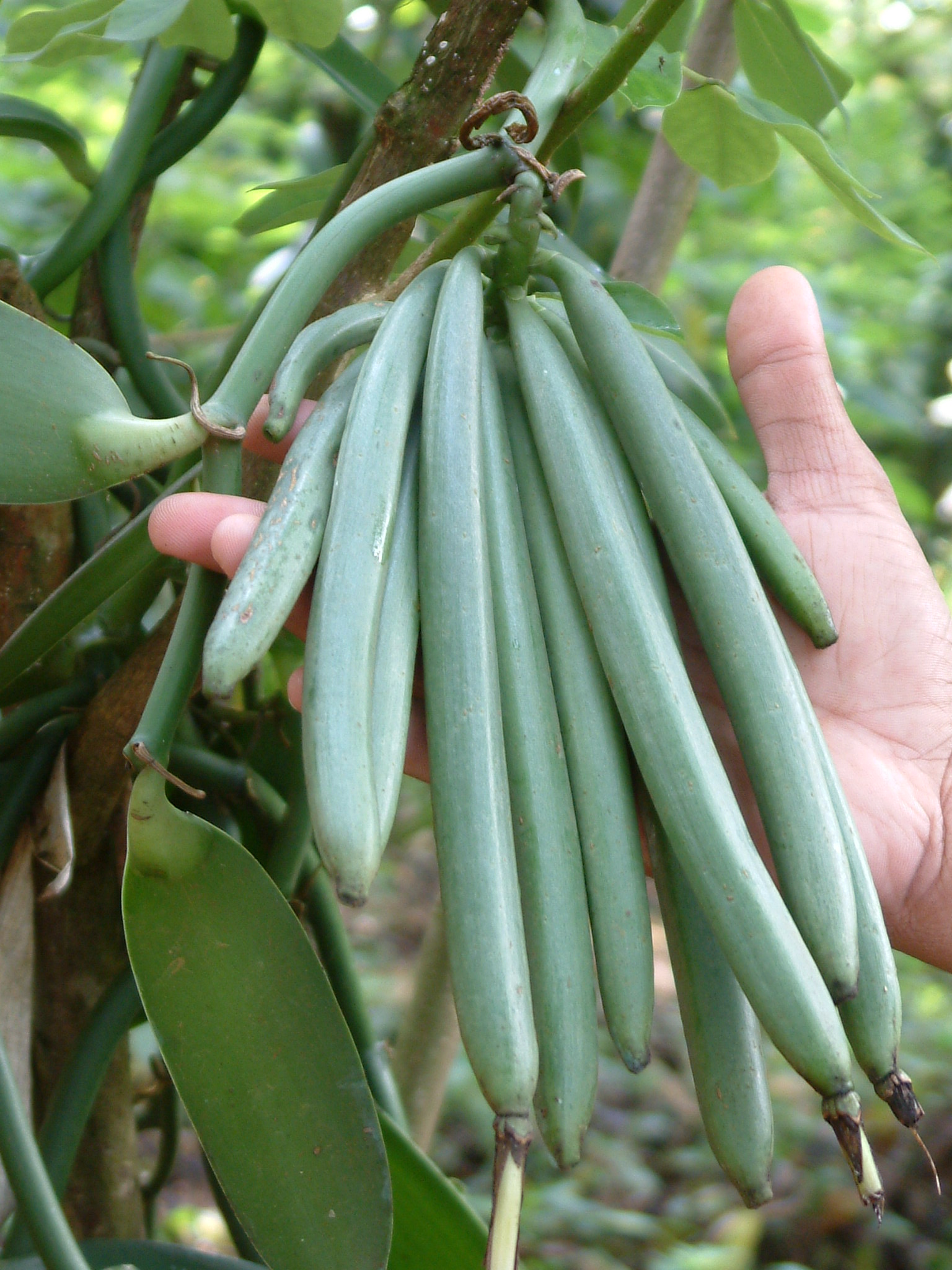
Vanilla beans, one of Veracruz's main crops

The primary sector of the economy (agriculture, forestry, and fishing) has been important since pre-Hispanic times and continues to be so both as a source of income as well as culturally. The state has abundant rainfall and extremely fertile soils, as well as a long coastline and forest containing a wide variety of trees and other plants.

Cultivable land covers about 1 million hectares (2,471,053.8 acres), half of which are privately owned and 43% are ejido or communal. The rest is occupied by human settlements. There are 3,620 units are parceled out to 270,000 ejido members. Fifty-two and a half percent of agricultural land is used for the growing of crops or used as pasture; 43.1% is forest or rainforest.

The chief agricultural products include coffee, vanilla, sugarcane, tobacco, bananas, coconuts, and vegetables, but local farmers depend mainly on corn and beans. Two corn crops are generally produced annually, planted on 644,936 hectares (1,593,671.6 acres) with a production of 1,114,325 tons. The state is the leading national producer of coffee, sugarcane, corn, and rice. Coffee is grown on 152,993 hectares (378,053.9 acres), producing 400,575 tons. Export earnings from this crop are about US$232 million annually. Most coffee is grown in the mountain areas of Córdoba-Huatusco, Coatepec-Teocelo-Cosautlán, and Misantla-Tlapacoyan-Atzalan. Sugarcane is cultivated on 254,000 hectares (627,647.7 acres), producing 16,867,958 tons annually. Veracruz is the largest producer of rice with 24,000 hectares (59,305.3 acres) producing 120,000 tons. Much of this crop is protected by import bans from Asia.

The state grows half of Mexico's citrus fruit and produces the largest number of citrus varieties. Citrus cultivation occupies 180,577 hectares (446,215.5 acres) and yields 2,575,140 tons annually, including oranges, tangerines, mandarins, limes, and grapefruit. The majority of citrus is grown in the northern part of the state. Most of the limes grown are exported, which supports the packing and shipping industry. Veracruz is the largest mango producer in the country, with 31,640 hectares (78,184.1 acres) in cultivation, producing 287,000 tons, primarily of the manila variety that is preferred in Mexico. Ninety-five percent of mangoes grown in Veracruz are consumed fresh within Mexico, although exports to Canada have begun. Vanilla beans, another major Mexican crop, are native to Veracruz, grown mostly in the area known as Totonacapan in and around Papantla.

Livestock raising is critical to the state's economy. There are over 300,000 production units in the state, most of which raise cattle. Veracruz is Mexico's main beef producer, producing 14% of the country's total beef. In addition to beef cattle, other livestock species include dairy cattle, pigs, sheep, goats, and domestic fowl, as well as horses and bees.

The state's inland tropical forests supply dyewoods, hardwoods, and rubber. About 20% of Veracruz is forested, with 220,000 hectares of temperate forest and 1,200,000 hectares (2,965,265.6 acres) of tropical forests. Logging in the state produces 128,254 cubic m (4,529,247.2 cubic ft) of wood products per year. The most exploited species include pine, oyamel, cypress, and oak. Some tropical hardwoods are harvested as well.

Veracruz's long coastline supports a large fishing industry, producing 20% of Mexico's catch. Most of the country's mojarra, oysters, and shrimp come from the state. Other major seafood catches include crab, sea bass, and red snapper.

Agroindustry focuses on the processing of coffee and sugar products, with citrus packers holding an important position as well.

=== Natural resources ===
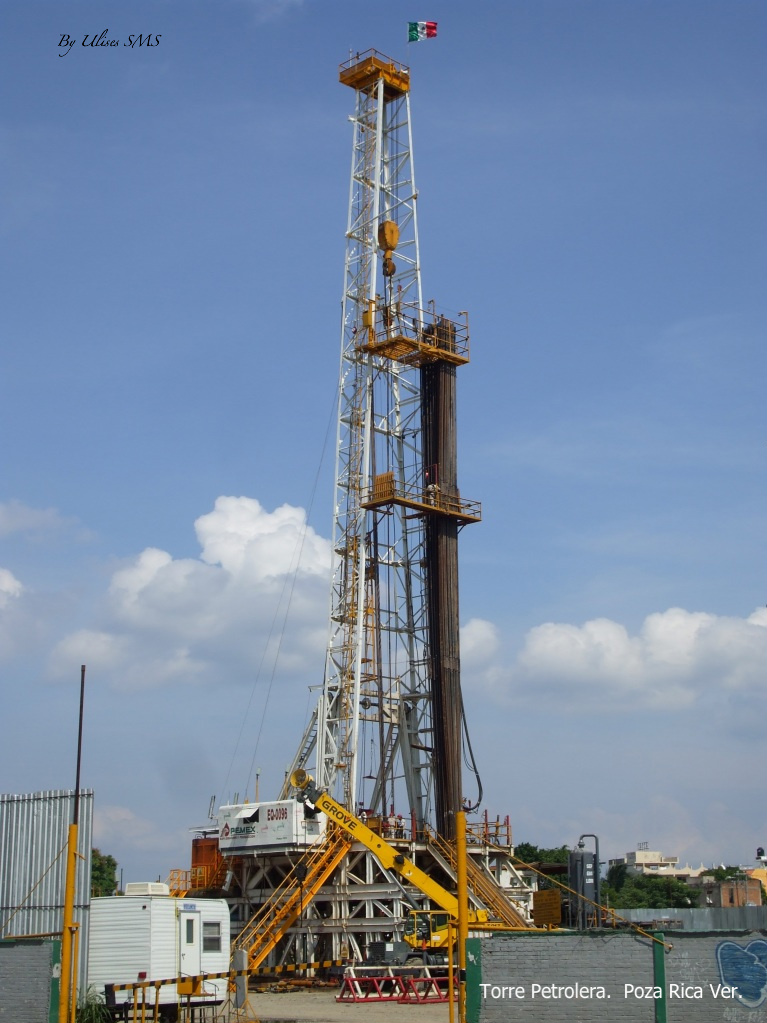
Petroleum tower, Poza Rica

As a resource-rich state, Veracruz plays a significant role in Mexico's economy. It has about 35% of the country's water supply, and is a key hub for oil production. Although the state's mountains contain unexploited coal, iron, gold, and silver reserves, its mining activity focuses primarily on non-metallic minerals such as calcium, feldspar, kaolin, marble, and silica. The state ranks fourth in the country for non-metallic mineral output. In total, mining contributes 1.5% to the state's economy.

Veracruz was a pioneer in both the extraction and refining of petroleum products. The state has about one-fourth of Mexico's petroleum reserves and ranks third in petroleum production. Most of this production is concentrated in the northern part of the state. Approximately 40,000,000 barrels (6,400,000 cubic meters) of oil are produced each year and 109,870,000,000 cubic feet (3.111×10^{9} m^{3}) of natural gas. Petrochemicals represent 28.1% of the state's manufacturing, in which Veracruz ranks first nationally. There are 22 petrochemical plants, with the most important being Cosoleacaque, Jáltipan de Morelos, La Cangrejera, Poza Rica, Pajaritos, and Minatitlán.

==== Golden Lane Oil Fields ====
Map of the Golden Lane Oil Fields

The "Golden Lane" ("Dos Bocas-Alamo structure" or "The Ridge") refers to a series of oil fields aligned in an arc onshore and a symmetrical alignment offshore, forming two sides of an atoll from the Cretaceous period,180 km (111.9 mi) long. The structure was discovered in 1908 by Weetman Pearson's Mexican Eagle Petroleum Company's San Diego de la Mar No. 1 well, which produced 2,500 barrels per day.

The Golden Lane oil fields penetrate a massive elliptical reef platform, identified as the Sierra del Abra limestone (consisting of reef, backreef, and lagoonal facies), which dips southeast. Selection of the discovery well site was opportune, due to the presence of petroleum seeps, as had been Edward Laurence Doheny's La Pez No. 1 well in the Ebano-Panuco petroleum district west of Tampico, Tamaulipas, which was the first Mexican discovery well in 1904. In 1908, the infamous Dos Bocas oil fire occurred after the San Diego de la Mar No. 3 blowout. This fire was followed by another at the Potrero del Llano No. 4 well, which produced 100,000 barrels per day during the three months it was out of control. Doheny's Cerro Azul No. 4 well, located by Ezequiel Ordonez, became the largest daily production record holder in 1916 at 260,000 barrels.

Geophysical studies, in particular gravimetry, starting in 1920, led to discovery of the Poza Rica Field in 1932 and Moralillo Field in 1948, on the west flank of the Golden Lane in the Tamabra fore-reef facies. Refraction seismography surveys started in 1930, augmented in 1948 by reflection seismography, leading to the discovery of the atoll's southern extent, with the Ezequiel Ordonez No. 1 well in 1952 and additional discoveries through 1968. Marine seismic and magnetometer surveys starting in 1957 showed the extent of the atoll offshore and led to the first offshore well, Isla de Lobos No. 1-B, in 1963. The well depths are on the order of 500 meters onshore and 2,000 meters offshore.

=== Industry, transportation and commerce ===
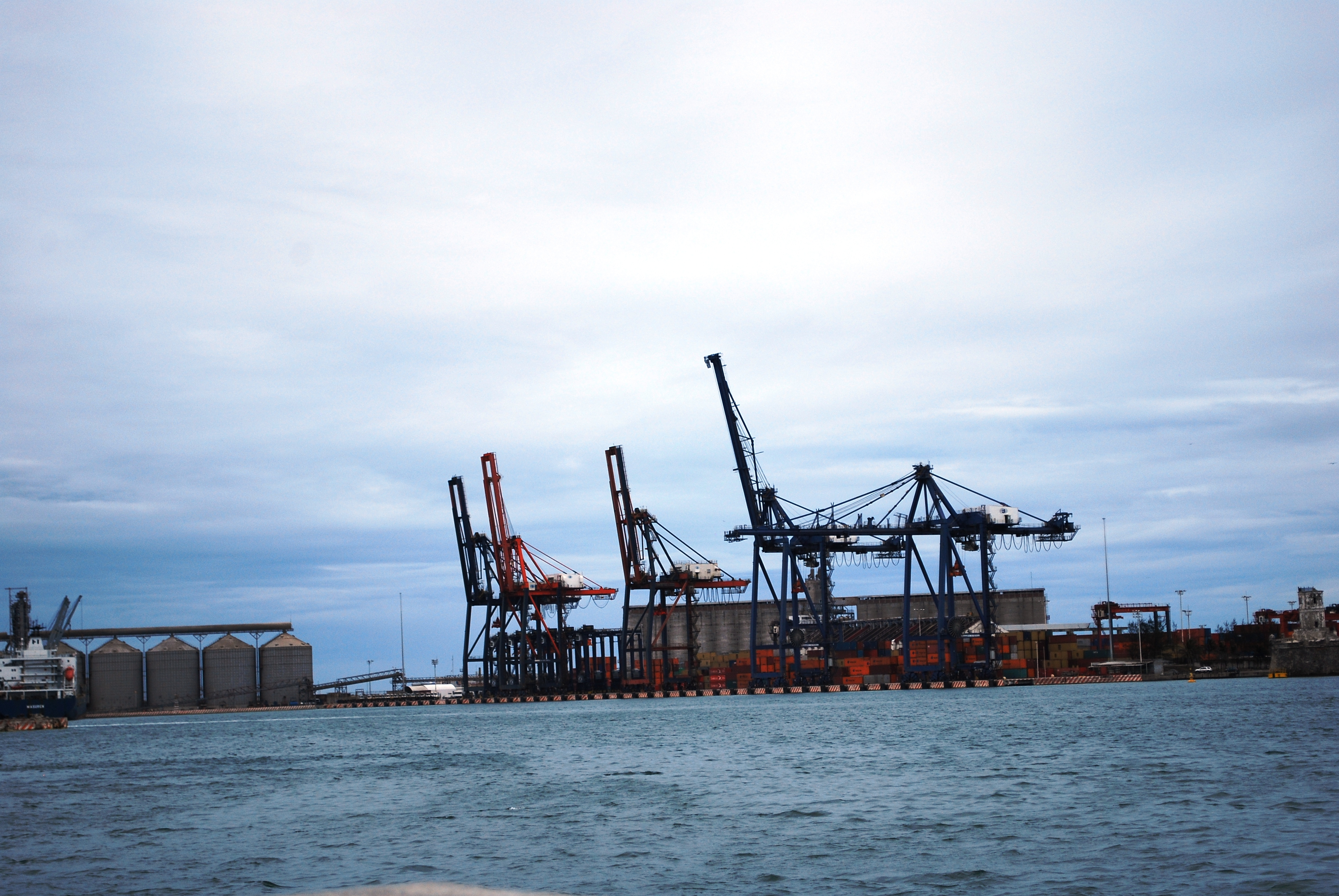
Portion of the port of Veracruz

Laguna Verde Nuclear Power Plant (Green Lagoon Nuclear Power Plant) in Alto Lucero, Veracruz, produces about 4.5% of Mexico's electrical energy. Twenty-one percent to 33% of the state's gross domestic product (GDP) is derived from manufacturing, with the chemical and petrochemical sectors contributing about 64% of the manufacturing GDP. Other products include metals, processed foods, beverages, printing and publishing, textiles, and machinery. Most of the state's industry takes place in the municipalities of Coatzacoalcos, Córdoba, Cosoleacaque, Minatitlán, Orizaba, Poza Rica, Tuxpan, and Veracruz with over 5,000 establishments. The rest is divided among nearly 11,000 smaller establishments. There are five major industrial parks: Bruno Pagliai, Ixtac, Petroquímico Morelos, Córdoba-Amatlán, and Parque 2000. The largest of these is Bruno Pagliai, covering 300.8 hectares (743 acres).

Transportation and commerce are important forces in the state, mostly linked to importing and exporting through Veracruz's four deepwater ports. The focus of most of these activities is the port city, the location of which on the Gulf Coast of Mexico makes it a key export hub. The port of Veracruz handles 75% of Mexico's port activity, with exports going elsewhere in Latin America as well as to Europe and the United States. The state's primary exports include coffee, fertilizer, fish, crustaceans, and fresh fruits. Other ports include those in Tuxpan and Coatzacoalcos. Most highway, rail, and air connections link to the port of Veracruz and other ports to the south. The state has 73 companies classified as high-volume exporters, and it is ranked sixth in the country for exports.

Veracruz contains five major food wholesale markets, 146 government-sponsored markets, about 75,000 private stores, and 201 supermarkets. Wholesale vendors focus on agricultural products such as wood, livestock, and food products. The major focal point for international business is the World Trade Center Veracruz, also known as EXPOVER, in Boca del Río. Inaugurated in 1989, the center has facilities to accommodate 5,000 people in 7,000 square metres (75,000 sq ft); an exhibition hall of 12,000 square metres (130,000 sq ft); a business center; and parking for over 800 vehicles.

In the industrial sector, relatively poor municipios (municipalities) are not catching up to relatively rich ones, although the latter are not diverging, either. A policy of encouraging much more domestic and/or foreign investment has been recommended for poorer areas to prosper and the outflow of residents is to stop.

=== Handicrafts ===
In the more rural and Indigenous areas of the state, a number of handicrafts are still made and sold to local buyers and tourists alike. Many of these crafts are produced by communities that specialize in one or more types. Wood furniture and other items are made by the Huasteca people, mostly from cedar and palm, although the best work comes from the towns of Ozulama and Castillo de Teayo. Teocelo and Monte Blanco are known for bamboo furniture and other items. Musical instruments of wood, such as a type of guitar called a jarana, are constructed in the Los Tuxtlas area, especially in Catemaco, and flutes made in Papantla. Wooden masks are made in Teocelo, and items made of coffee wood are made in Misantla, Coatepec, Huastusco, and Xico. Corn husks are used to make decorative figures, often religious, in Nautla and Naranjos de Amatlán. Palm fronds are woven into fans, shoes, and baskets in Jalcomulco, Ozulama, and Tlalixcoyan.

Ceramics have been made in almost all parts of Veracruz since the time of the Olmecs. One area known for its ceramic work is Papantla, which also includes life-sized representations of folk dancers from the area, along with more mundane glazed and unglazed pottery items. Minatitlán is known for its production of ceramic cooking utensils that are also popular in the neighboring municipalities of Actopan and Naolinco. San Miguel Aguasuelos and Jalcomulco are known for their white clay ware, including water jars, toys, nativity scenes, bells, and more.

Traditional clothing and embroidery can be most easily found in the La Huasteca area, where elaborately decorated women's blouses can be seen, especially in the El Higo and Tlalixcoyan area. In Totonacalpan, men are still often seen in white shirts and pants with a bag to hold personal items. This dress dates back to the early colonial period and has changed little since then. Other areas like Naranjos de Amatlán, Minatilán, and the city of Veracruz specialize in wool items such as dresses, skirts, and jackets, often decorated with cross-stitching as are other textile crafts like tablecloths and napkins. Leather items include shoes, jackets, bags, wallets, belts, and boots and are usually made in the La Huasteca region, Teocolo, Citlaltépetl, and Naolinco.

== Culture ==
=== Cuisine ===
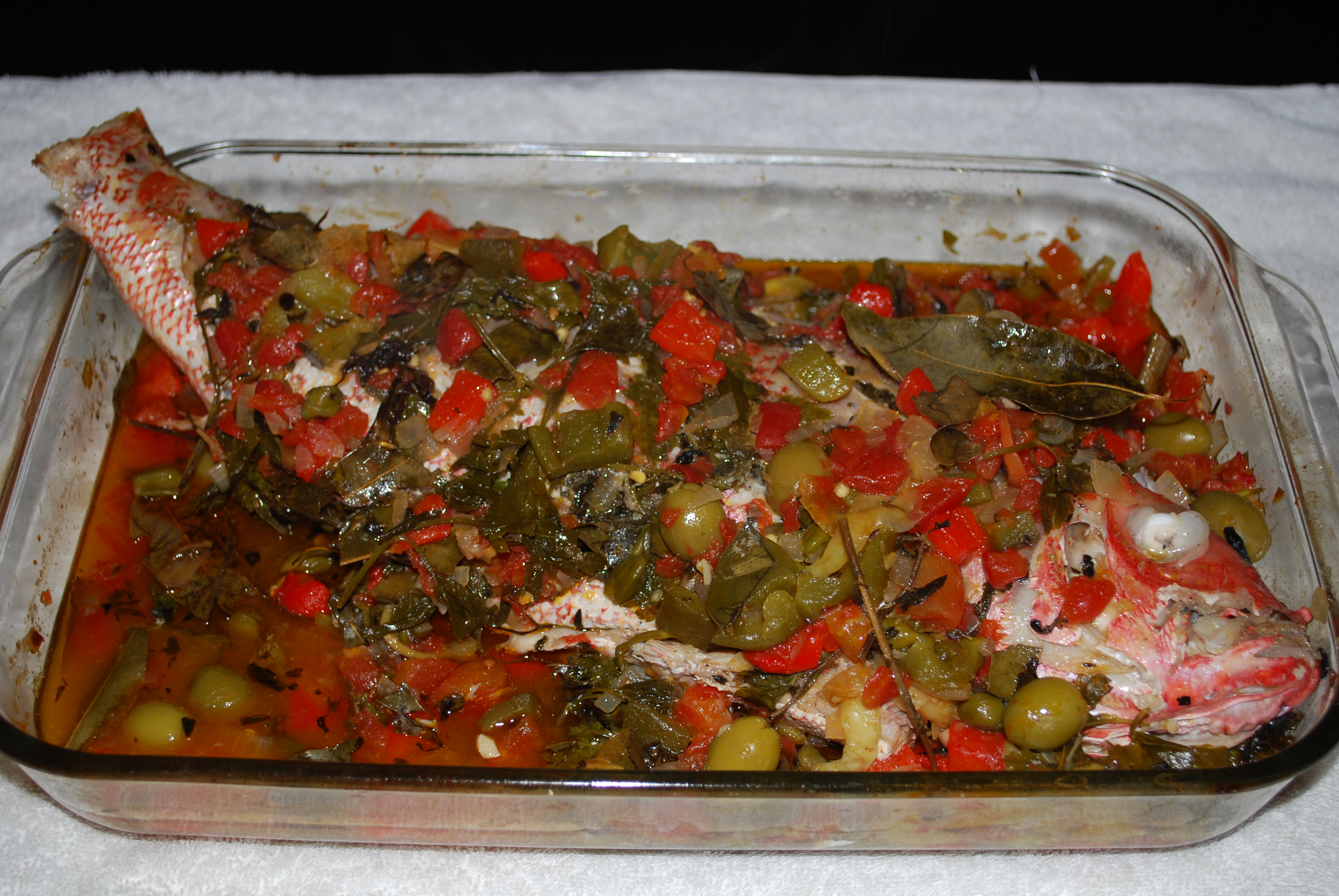
Huachinango (red snapper) a la Veracruzana

The cuisine of the state is unique in Mexico, mixing Spanish, Indigenous, and Caribbean influences and dating back to the pre-Hispanic period. The staple food triumvirate of corn, beans, and squash is supplemented by tropical fruits, vanilla beans, and an herb called acuyo or hoja santa. Another important native contribution is seafood, which is featured in many dishes such as arroz a la tumbada, a soupy seafood rice, and caldo de mariscos, a seafood soup.

During the colonial period, a variety of spices and ingredients were introduced to Veracruz, which made a significant impact on the local cuisine. Among spices introduced by the Spanish were bay laurel, cilantro, parsley, and thyme from Europe and cloves, cinnamon, and black pepper from Asia. They also brought almonds, capers, garlic, olives, olive oil, rice, and wheat. Capers, garlic, and olive oil are essential ingredients in what is perhaps the most famous specialty of the region, huachinango a la Veracruzana (red snapper in a spicy tomato sauce). Caribbean imports such as sugar cane and pineapple were adapted, as well as the peanut, brought from Africa by the Portuguese although it is originally from South America.

Veracruz cuisine divides into six regions, each with its own specialties: Centro Norte (North Central), Centro Sur (South Central), Costa Norte (North Coast), Los Tuxtlas, Sierra, and Sotavento:

- The Centro Norte is centered on Xalapa, with dishes that tend to be more Indigenous in nature, strongly flavored with mild chili peppers. Common dishes include chilehuates (similar to tamales), stuffed chile peppers, and enchiladas, with less seafood and more pork and domestic fowl.
- The Centro Sur area is mostly Indigenous, encompassing the area of Amatlán; Córdoba; Coscomatepec; Cotaxtla; Fortín de las Flores; Huatusco; Huilango, Orizaba; Negra Yanga; and San Lorenzo de los Negros. Dishes there are similar to Centro Norte, but chayotes (a type of gourd) appear more often because this region is a major producer of the vegetable. Meats in adobo (a type of dressing) are common as well.
- The Costa Norte and Sierra area encompass the northern part of the state, such as the Pánuco River area and Totonacapan. This area is noted for a number of unique dishes such as frijoles en achuchutl, which is made with black beans, pork rind, chayotes, squash seeds, and jalapeño peppers. Bocoles are a kind of filled tortilla made with corn dough and stuffed with black beans, chorizo (pork sausage), eggs, or seafood, and then fried in lard. Tamales are often made with banana leaves. The area is also known for its breads, especially anise–flavored rolls.
- The Los Tuxtlas area encompasses the communities of Santiago, San Andrés, and Catemaco, an area that was once the center of Olmec civilization. There the cuisine features yucca; chocos (a type of edible flower); fish, especially mojarra; and exotic meats such as monkey and iguana.
- The Sotovento area is in the south of the state, and dishes there are heavily based on rice. Common dishes include arroz a la tumbada (rice cooked with seafood or meat) and rice with fried bananas. Seafood dishes are also prominent, based mostly on fish and shrimp. Hoja santa or hierba santa, a plant of the family Piperaceae, is a common ingredient..

=== Museums ===
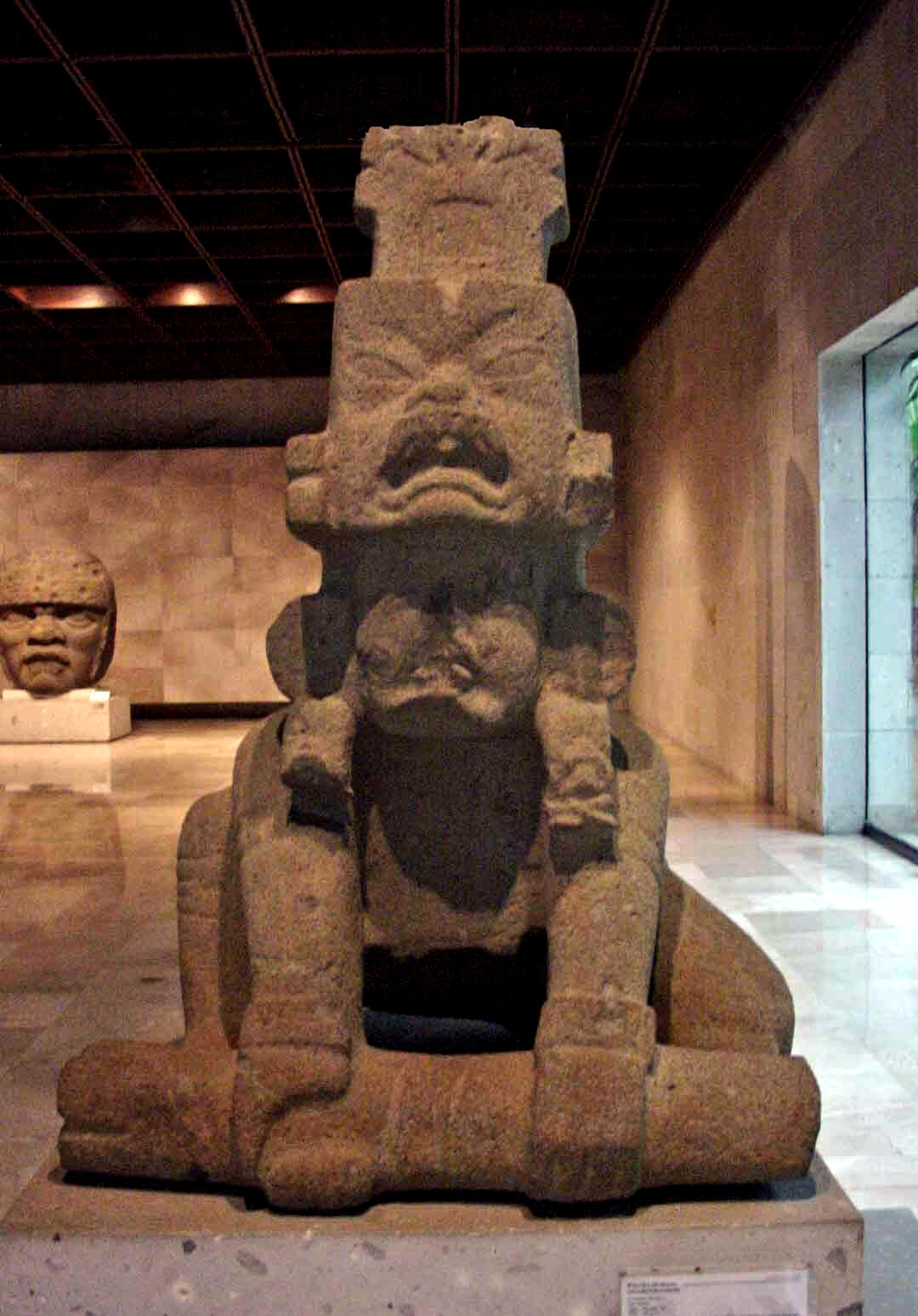
The Olmec San Martín Pajapan Monument 1, on exhibit at the Museum of Anthropology, Xalapa

The Veracruz state capital of Xalapa is also home to a number of important museums:

- The Xalapa Museum of Anthropology contains the second most important collection of Mesoamerican artifacts in the country. Building began in 1959 on 6 hectares (15 acres). The complex is divided into various halls and galleries by theme, focusing on the Olmec and Totonac cultures. The Patio Olmeca (Olmec Patio) contains the colossal head known as El Rey (The King), found in 1945. Other important artifacts include giant stelae and the San Martín Pajapan Monument 1 (at right).
- The Xalapa Museum of Science and Technology, contains more than 400 exhibitions in eight halls: Life, Ecology, Space, Transportation, Sciences, Energy, Water, and Earth.
- The Pinoteca Diego Rivera (Diego Rivera Public Art Gallery) was established by the state in the former Monastery of San Francisco in Xalapa, primarily to preserve and display Rivera's works owned by the state;but it also contains early works by José María Velasco, Jorge Cuesta, and Teodoro A. Dehesa.
- The Hacienda del Lencero, which was the home and headquarters of President Antonio López de Santa Anna in the 19th century, preserved and converted into a museum near Xalapa.

Other museums are scattered across the state:

- The Regional Museum of Anthropology in Tuxpan displays imore than 400 pieces in four halls from pre-Hispanic groups in the region, most of which from the center of the state and the Huasteca region on the edge of the Tuxpan River.
- Tuxpan also has the Mexican-Cuban Museum, containing a collection of photographs from the Cuban Revolution and a statue of José Martí.
- The Tuxteco Regional Museum in Santiago de Tuxtla contains Olmec and Totonac artifacts including art objects, farming implements, utensils, and more, with giant stone sculptures in the garden from the Tres Zapotes site.
- The Salvador Ferrando Museum, located in Tlacotalpan in the 19th-century home of local painter Salvador Ferrando, displays regional art, colonial history, and everyday items from the 16th to the 19th centuries.
- The Jardín Central (Central Garden) of the municipality of Tierra Blanca has a number of Totonac archeological pieces on display.
- The Archeological Museum of Córdoba, located in the city of the same name, has three exhibition halls containing artifacts from the Maya, Olmec, Toltec, and Huastec cultures, as well as a collection of historical photographs of the city.
- The Veracruz State Art Museum (Museo de Arte del Estado de Veracruz), located in Orizaba in what was the monastery associated with the Concordia Church, has a collection including works by Diego Rivera, Ignacio Rosas, and Gonzalo Argüelles, as well as a collection of historical photographs related to Veracruz and to art.
- The Malintzin Archeological Museum in the municipality of Nogales, a small museum with one hall containing photographs and documents, is located in the church where La Malinche and Juan de Jaramillo were reportedly married.

=== Fairs and festivals ===
The state is noted for its quantity and variety of festivals. The most important of these is Carnival, a Christian festival just before the season of Lent in the city of Veracruz. This city's version of the event begins with the "burning of bad humor," which is represented in effigy. A number of kings and queens are "crowned," including categories for children; but the most important of these is the Rey Feo (Ugly King) and the Reina del Carnaval (Queen of the Carnival). The latter is accompanies by cadets from the Naval Academy during the parade. This celebration is repeated all along the Veracruz coastline, with other significant festivities taking place in Alvarado, Coatzacoalcos, San Rafael, and Villa José Cardel. Minatitlán's celebration draws people from the nearby states of Oaxaca and Tabasco.

The Day of the Dead is celebrated in almost all of Mexico from October 31 to November 2, but there are local variances in Veracruz. In some places, the festival is commemorated during the months of August and September. In Papantla, boards or tables adorned with flowers, plant matter, and more on rooftops. In Tantoyuca, the festival is commemorated with costumes and music, similar to Carnival.

The Christian celebration of Candlemas, commemorating the presentation of Jesus at the Temple by St. Joseph and the Virgin Mary, is fused with traditions associated with Chalchiuhtlicua, the goddess of water, rivers, lakes, and ocean. She was replaced by the Virgin of Candlemas, protectress of fishermen, which has made this celebration particularly important on the coast—especially in Tlacotalpan, where it is celebrated with much pomp. In Jáltipan de Morelos, ethnic Nahuas and Popolucas dress in elaborate costumes and arrange their hair in intricate styles.

In Santa María Magdalena on July 22, the commemoration day of St. Mary Magdalene, bulls are set free to roam the streets.

Corn harvest festivals are prominent in the Huasteca region in municipalities such as Chontla, Chicontepec, and Ixhuatlán de Madero, which generally include native dances and corn-based foods.

=== Dance and music ===
"La malagueña"
"Son huasteco," performed by Los Hijos de la Malinche of Jáltipan, Veracruz

Veracruz is well known in the country for its music and dance. The fandango is a dance brought over from Spain. Today the state has two varieties: the jarocho and the huasteco. Indigenous and folk dances in the state are most often associated with rituals and religious festivals. These include a dance called los lisceres (a local dialectical variation of los leopardos (the leopards or the jaguars), also called los tigres (the tigers, from the Los Tuxtlas region, in which participants wear Olmec style masks representing the rain god Tlalóc. Another dance is los guaguas (the buses), in which the participants pay homage to the sun, and los Santiagos, which is related to the veneration of Saint James, the patron saint of Cortés. Still another dance is los negritos (the little black ones), created by African slaves and according to tradition, originating from a story about a boy who was bitten by a snake and the rituals done by his family for his healing.

The state's most famous dance, la danza de los voladores (the dance of the flyers), is as much a ritual and daredevil act as movements performed to music. The dance is a ceremony/ritual with roots in the pre-Hispanic period, presently best known as associated with the town of Papantla. It is believed to have originated with the Nahuas, Huastec, and Otomi in central Mexico, and then spread throughout most of Mesoamerica. The ritual consists of the dance and the climbing of a 30-meter (98.43-ft) pole from which four of the five participants tied with ropes then launch themselves to descend to the ground while the fifth remains on top of the pole, dancing and playing a flute and drum. According to myth, the ritual was created to petition the gods to end a severe drought. Although the ritual did not originate with the Totonacs, today it is most strongly associated with them, especially those in and around Papantla, as the ceremony has died off in most other places. The ceremony was named an Intangible Cultural Heritage by UNESCO in order to help the ritual survive and thrive in the modern world.

The state's best-known musical style is called the son, a musical variation that traces its origins to Spain and was developed during the 17th and 18th centuries. It is the state's most popular musical style shows, with influences from the many peoples who have lived there, including Indigenous groups, Portuguese, Italians, Africans, French, and others. The music is generally performed on harps, violins, and guitars, with an occasional wind instrument. Son Huasteco (also called Son Huapango) is a variety of son played in the north of the state, mostly among the Totonacs; Son Jarocho is the better known and more popular variety played in the south. The famous Grammy award-winning song "La Bamba" by the Los Lobos rock band is said have its roots in a traditional folk song from Veracruz—hence the reference to the marinero sailor in that song).

The state has produced a number of musicians famous in the country. One of the best known is Francisco Gabilondo Soler. Gabilondo Soler is best known for creating a character known as Cri-cri, a singing cricket for a radio show in the first half of the 20th century. As a musician, he specialized in writing children's songs such as "Abuelito" (an affectionate way to refer to a grandfather); "Caminito de la escuela" ("On the Way to School"); "El baile de los muñecos" ("The Dance of the Dolls)"; "El burrito" (The Little Donkey"); and "La negrita Cucurumbé" ("Cucurumbé, the Little Black Girl"). A number of Gabilondo Soler's works have been translated into other languages.

Another famous musician from Veracruz is Agustín Lara, who has had even more international fame. Nicknamed "Flaco de oro" ("Skinny Golden One"), he always insisted that he was born in Tlacotalpan, Veracruz and not Mexico City as shown by records. Lara formed his first band in 1930 called El Son de Marabú and toured almost continuously in Mexico and abroad during his career. His most famous compositions include "Veracruz," "Noche de Ronda" ("Nighttime Rounds"), and "Solamente una vez" ("Only Once").

Other prominent musicians of the state include Toña La Negra or María Antonia del Carmen Peregino; Narcisco Serradel; Lorenzo Barcelata; and María Greever.

=== Art and architecture ===
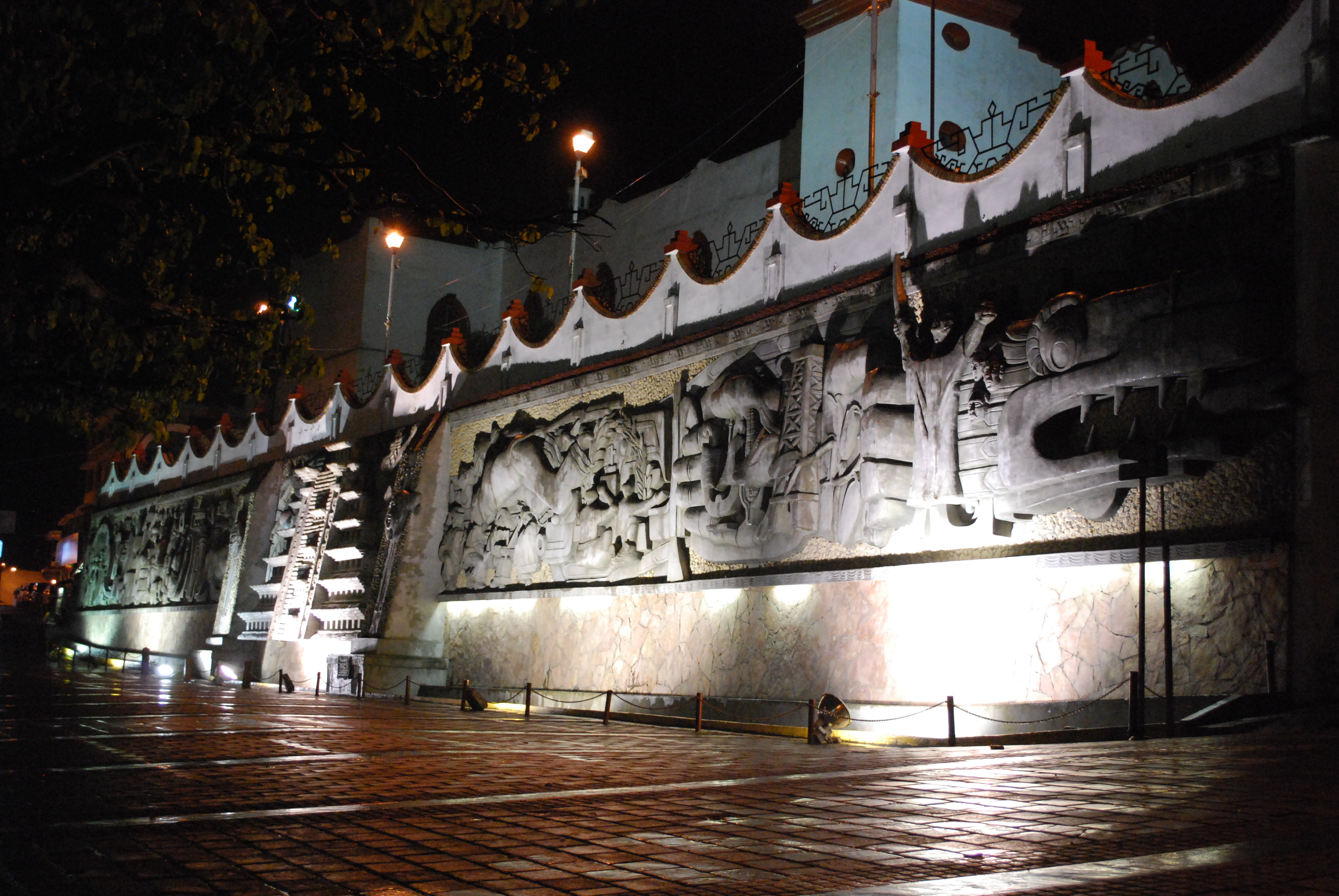
Mural by Teodoro Cano García depicting history of Papantla in the town square

During the colonial era, a movement called the estilo veracruzano (Veracruz style) developed mostly by focusing on landscapes in the state with a certain amount of Indigenous influence, although the painters themselves were criollo or Mexico-born Spanish. These paintings focus on mountains, valles, coasts, volcanoes, and other natural phenomena in the state. Most of the proponents of this style were born in Veracruz itself, including José Justo Montiel; Gonzalo Argüelles Bringas; Eugenio Landecio (the teacher of José María Velasco); Natal Pesado; and Ignacio Rosas.

However, most of Veracruz's best-known artists have come from the 19th and 20th centuries. In the 19th century, these include Miguel Mata Reyes, Salvador Ferrando, José María Jara, Enrique Guerra, and Alberto Fuster.

- Miguel Mata Reyes is best known for his contributions to the design of the Palacio de Bellas Artes as well a portrait of Antonio López de Santa Anna.
- Salvador Ferrando was a portrait and landscape artist from the north of the state. Until recently, most of his work had been hidden in a museum named after him in the Tlacotalpan region. Much of it now is on display at the Museo de Arte de Veracruz (Veracruz Art Museum) in Orizaba.
- José María Jara is noted for his paintings of Veracruz customs, whose works include El Velorio (The Wake), which was presented at the World's Fair in Paris.
- Enrique Guerra was an important sculptor at the end of the 19th century. His best-known works are bas reliefs and include Asesinato de César (Assassination of Caesar), Coroliano (Coriolanus), Thais, and Crisálida (Chrysalis).
- Alberto Fuster was most active at the end of the century, noted for bringing symbolism painting to Mexico from his stay in Europe. His works include El progreso (Progress), Safo en el templo de Delfos (Sappho at the Temple of Delphi), and Nativa con loro (Native Woman with a Parrot).

From the 20th century, there are three important artists, Carlos Bracho, Norberto Martínez, and Teodoro Cano García.

- Carlos Bracho, active in the first half of the century, was a sculptor. His works have been done in plaster, bronze, terracotta and green onyx and include monumental works which can be found in the cities of Xalapa, Puebla, Pachuca, and Mexico City. His best-known works are El abrazo (The Embrace); Cabeza verde (Green Head), and El campesino se apodera de la tierra (The Peasant Takes Possession of the Land).
- Norberto Martínez lived only 45 years but is considered one of the most prolific Mexican painters, dedicating most of his works to social themes. A number of these are early murals such as El comercio (Commerce) in the Jáuregi de Xalapa market as well as an untitled work in a private home in Córdoba that deals with the fusion of the Spanish, Indigenous, and African ethnicities in Mexico. Later works include three murals in the main stairwell of the School of Law at the University of Xalapa and El hombre y el conocimiento (Man and Knowledge) at the Universidad Veracruzana..
- Teodoro Cano García is one of Mexico's most famous muralists of the late 20th century, famous for promotion of the Totonac culture of his home town of Papantla. He has created paintings, sculptures, etchings, photography, and mixed media works with his murals and sculptures most acclaimed. Examples of his work can be seen in various parts of public buildings in Papantla.

Most of Veracruz's older architecture can be found in the inland cities of Xalapa and Córdoba rather than the city of Veracruz, because although it was the first Spanish settlement in Mexico, it lost most its older structures to various invasions. Architecture from the 16th to the 19th century includes colonial Spanish, Moorish, Neo-gothic, and Neoclassical. From the 20th century on, a number of names stand out, including Armando Bravo Ramírez, who remodeled the State Government Palace and the facade of the Capillas de Ánimas, both in Xalapa. Other prominent names responsible for many projects in the state include Luis González Aparicio, Bernal Lascuraín Rangel, and Luis Manuel Tello Deschamps.

=== Literature ===
The literary arts reached their peak in Veracruz starting in the 19th century and extending to the "Generation of the 1950s."

- Salvador Díaz Mirón is one of Veracruz's most-distinguished poets. Over his lifetime from the late 19th to early 20th centuries, he worked as a professor, politician, and journalist, contributing to periodicals such as El Veracruzano (The Veracruz Native), El Orden (The Order), and El Imparcial (The Impartial). His creative works include some of the first Romantic pieces produced in Mexico, such as Oda a Víctor Hugo (Ode to Victor Hugo); Ojos verdes (Green Eyes); Gloria (Glory); and Voces interiores (Inner Voices). Other of his works include Poesías A Tirsa (Poems to Tirsa); Nox (Latin for Night, although the poem is also known as Claudia); and his last works such as Al buen cura (To the Good Priest) and La mujer de nieve (The Snow Woman). Mirón became a member of the Academia Mexicana de la Lengua (Mexican Academy of Language) and is buried at the Rotonda de las Personas Ilustres (Rotunda of Illustrious Persons; originally named the Rotonda de los Hombres Ilustres [Rotunda of Illustrious Men]) in Mexico City.
- María Enriqueta Camarillo was one of a number of women writers to gain prominence in Mexico at the end of the 19th century. Although she wrote a number of works such as Jirón del mundo (Fragment of the World), Sorpresas de la vida (Surprises of Life), and El Secreto (The Secret), she is best known for Rosas de la infancia (Roses of Childhood), with which many Mexicans learned to read.

Writers born at the end of the 19th century, such as Gregorio López y Fuentes, Manuel Maples Arce, and Jorge Mateo Cuesta Porte-Petit were often concerned with social issues: for instance, El Indio (The Indian) by López; Metrópolis by Maples; and Canto a un dios mineral (Song to a Mineral God) by Cuesta. The next generation, born in the first decades of the 20th century, became known as the Generation of the 1950s.

During this time, Veracruz's literary tradition consolidated and decided to break type. One example is Juan Hernández Ramírez's writing of poetry in the Nahuatl spoken in the La Huasteca area of Veracruz. One important name from this generation is Emilio Carballido, who wrote some 100 plays as well as scripts for radio and television. Among his works are Rosalba y los llaveros (Rosalba and the Keychains), Felicidad (Happiness), and Las visitaciones del Diablo (The Visitations of the Devil). In 1996, he won the Premio Nacional de Literatura (National Literature Prize) and in 2002 the Ariel de Oro (Golden Ariel) for his work in cinema.

=== Religion ===
The overwhelming majority of people in the state are Catholic, however, there is a significant Protestant minority and a number who profess Judaism. The patron saint of Veracruz is Rafael Guízar y Valencia, a Mexican Catholic bishop canonized as a saint in 2006.

== Education ==
Public education in the state is supervised by the state's Dirección General de Educación Popular (General Directorate of Popular Education) and the Dirección General de Educación Media Superior y Superior (General Directorate of Upper Secondary and Higher Education). The current system is the result of a number of reforms made in the 1980s and 1990s. In the late 1990s, 302 new school campuses were created statewide and 257 were remodeled. The new ones included new schools for special education and distance learning, as well as technological institutes, giving the state one of the country's highest number of school campuses for a total of 20,479, with nearly 2 million students and about 85,000 teachers.

Ninety-three percent of the schools are in the basic education category (preschool, primary, and middle schools). Preschools also include those geared towards the Indigenous populations, focusing on bilingual and bicultural education in both the Indigenous language and Spanish. A major focus of these and other schools is to eliminate illiteracy in Indigenous communities. The Medio Superior level includes vocational high school and technical colleges, which account for 6.6% of schools in the public system. The Superior level includes teachers' colleges and universities, with 166 institutes at this level and about 68,000 students studying 221 different majors. There are also 63 master's degree programs and six PhD programs. These institutions serve about 135,000 students, about 19% of the college-aged population (19-to 24-year-olds), slightly below the national average of 24%.

The major state university is the Universidad Veracruzana in the capital of Xalapa—offering 56 bachelor's degrees, 37 master's degrees, and five PhDs, and noted for its large and varied sports programs—with campuses in 14 other cities. About 37% of university students attend the main public university, with a student population of 47,000 undergraduates and 2,000 postgraduates. Other important schools in the state include the Instituto Tecnologico de Veracruz (Veracruz Institute of Technology), in Veracruz; the Universidad Anáhuac (Anahuac University), in Xalapa; the Universidad de Xalapa (University of Xalapa), in Xalapa; the Instituto Tecnológico y de Estudios Superiores de Monterrey (Monterrey Institute of Technology and Higher Education), in Córdoba; the Universidad Cristóbal Colón (Christopher Columbus University), in Veracruz; the Heroica Escuela Naval Militar (Veracruz Naval Academy), in Antón Lizardo; and the Instituto Tecnológico del Mar (Marine Technology Institute), in Boca del Rio.

== Demographics ==
=== Largest cities ===
Largest cities or towns in Veracruz, as of 2020 Source:
| Rank | | Municipality | Pop. |
|---|---|---|---|
| 1 | Veracruz | Veracruz/ Boca del Río | 537,963 |
| 2 | Xalapa-Enríquez | Xalapa | 443,063 |
| 3 | Coatzacoalcos | Coatzacoalcos | 212,540 |
| 4 | Poza Rica | Poza Rica | 180,057 |
| 5 | Minatitlán | Minatitlán/ Cosoleacaque | 149,192 |
| 6 | Córdoba | Córdoba | 139,075 |
| 7 | Orizaba | Orizaba | 120,500 |
| 8 | Túxpam de Rodríguez Cano | Tuxpan | 89,557 |
| 9 | Martínez de la Torre | Martínez de la Torre | 64,692 |
| 10 | San Andrés Tuxtla | San Andrés Tuxtla | 64,445 |

Historical population
| Year | Pop. | ±% |
|---|---|---|
| 1895 | 863,220 | — |
| 1900 | 981,030 | +13.6% |
| 1910 | 1,132,859 | +15.5% |
| 1921 | 1,159,935 | +2.4% |
| 1930 | 1,377,293 | +18.7% |
| 1940 | 1,619,338 | +17.6% |
| 1950 | 2,040,231 | +26.0% |
| 1960 | 2,727,899 | +33.7% |
| 1970 | 3,815,422 | +39.9% |
| 1980 | 5,387,680 | +41.2% |
| 1990 | 6,228,239 | +15.6% |
| 1995 | 6,737,324 | +8.2% |
| 2000 | 6,908,975 | +2.5% |
| 2005 | 7,110,214 | +2.9% |
| 2010 | 7,643,194 | +7.5% |
| 2015 | 8,112,505 | +6.1% |
| 2020 | 8,062,579 | −0.6% |

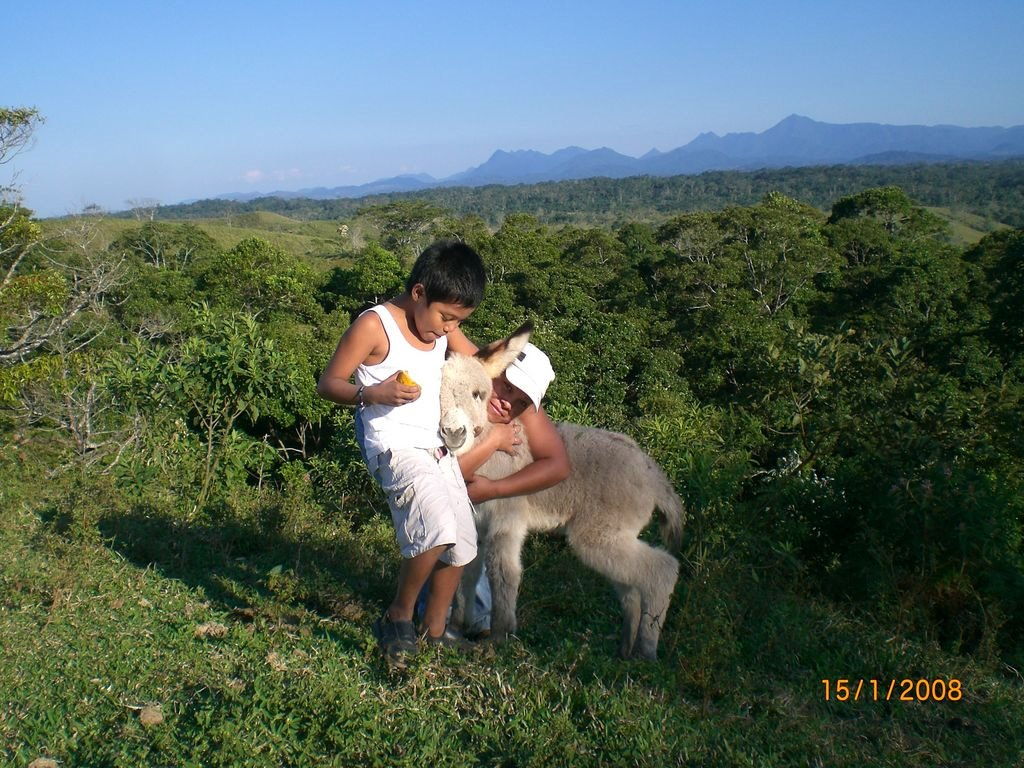
Two children with their donkey in the state of Veracruz, 2008

The state of Veracruz, especially its port, has been a crossroads for various cultures since the very early colonial period. The port of Veracruz has brought cargo, sailors, seamen, and slaves from various parts of the world, especially from the Caribbean and Europe. The state has Indigenous cultural influences mixed with those from Europe, Africa, and the Afro-Caribbean. These can be best found in the state's music, its culinary traditions, and the people themselves.

The number of ethnic communities in the state has been calculated at 2,062. The most numerous include the Nahuas, Totonacs, Huastecs, Popoluca, Zapotecas, Chinantecas, Otomi, Mazatec, Tepehuas, Mixtecs, Zoque, Mixes, Mayas, and Tzotzils, all Indigenous groups. The largest community is the Nahuas, who make up over half the Indigenous population. Most native communities can be found in 68 municipalities, especially Tehuipango, Mixtla de Altamirano, Astacinga, Soledad Atzompa, Atlahuilco, Tequila, Tlaquilpan, Los Reyes, Magdalena, San Andres Tenejapan, Tantoyuca, Zongolica, Chicontepec, Papantla, Ixhuatlán de Madero, Soteapan, Playa Vicente, Mecayapan y Coyutla, Benito Juárez, Coxquihi, Espinal, Filomeno Mata, Ixcatepec, Mecatlán, and Zozocolco de Hidalgo.

In 1998, about 10% of the population reportedly spoke an Indigenous language; however, this does not take into account all Indigenous peoples. The census of 2005 counted 605,135 as speaking an Indigenous language.

There are also small immigrant communities of Spaniards, Basques, Italians, and Lebanese in the state. Africans were first brought to Mexico through slavery to the Veracruz port. At one point, they outnumbered Europeans. A significant number ran away from haciendas (estates) and plantations to form their own communities, sometimes allied with Indigenous groups, including the rebellion led by Gaspar Yanga, who successfully negotiated a free African community with Spanish authorities in 1609. Like other groups, many of African descent intermarried with other groups, with the category of mulatto existing in the old colonial caste system for those with African blood. Today, the vast majority of Afro-Mexicans in Veracruz and other parts of the country are spread out and intermixed with the rest of the population. According to the 2020 Census, 2.67% of Veracruz's population identified as Black, Afro-Mexican, or of African descent.

With a population of 7,110,214 in 2005, Veracruz is the third most populous entity in the country, after the Federal District of Mexico City and the State of Mexico. Population growth has slowed in the state in the last decades, due to lower birthrates and the exodus of migrants, mostly men. Women outnumber men. The migration of men outside the state has put more women into the state's workforce. The decline in birthrates is the elevation of education levels, especially among women, and urbanization, with about one-third of the state's population living in urban centers, especially Veracruz, Xalapa, Coatzacoalcos, Minatitlán, and Papantla. Most (90%) of the state's communities outside of municipal seats have fewer than 500 people, containing only 21% of the total population. Approximately 75% of the population is under 45 years of age, and 30% under the age of 15.

Life expectancy is just under the norm for the rest of the country.

== Tourism ==
Tourism mostly centers on the port city of Veracruz, but other tourist destinations exist throughout the state as well. There are over 1,000 hotels in the state, over half of which are small, family-owned enterprises. Almost all of the four- and five-star establishments are located in metropolitan areas of Veracruz. Many of the state's major historical and cultural monuments are located in the port of Veracruz, including the aquarium (Acuario de Veracruz); the Museum of the City (Museo de la Ciudad); the Agustín Lara Museum; the Santiago Fortress (Baluarte de Santiago); the Museo de Las Atarazanas (Royal Shipyards Museum; and the San Juan de Ulúa Fort.

To the north of the port city is the Sierra or Totonacalpan area of the state, home to the Totonac people, including the important pre-Hispanic city of El Tajín and the present day city of Papantla. The modern city is best known as the home of the Totonac version of the dance of the flyers, in which dancers spin from poles 80 ft (24.4 m) high. The area is also the native habitat of the vanilla bean.

Catemaco, another prominent tourist city, is located along the coast to the south of the port city. The area's two main features are Lake Catemaco, located in the crater of an extinct volcano, and Isla Tanaxpillo, located just off the coast, which is also called the "island of the monkeys" or "island of the baboons" due to a group of feral monkeys that escaped and found refuge there.

Inland is the coffee-growing region in and around the cities of Coatepec and Xalapa. Another inland city, Orizaba, is best known for a nearby volcano, but also has a large waterfall called El Elefante (The Elephant) and a canyon called the Cañon de Río Blanco (Río Blanco Canyon, or White River Canyon).

== Archeological sites ==
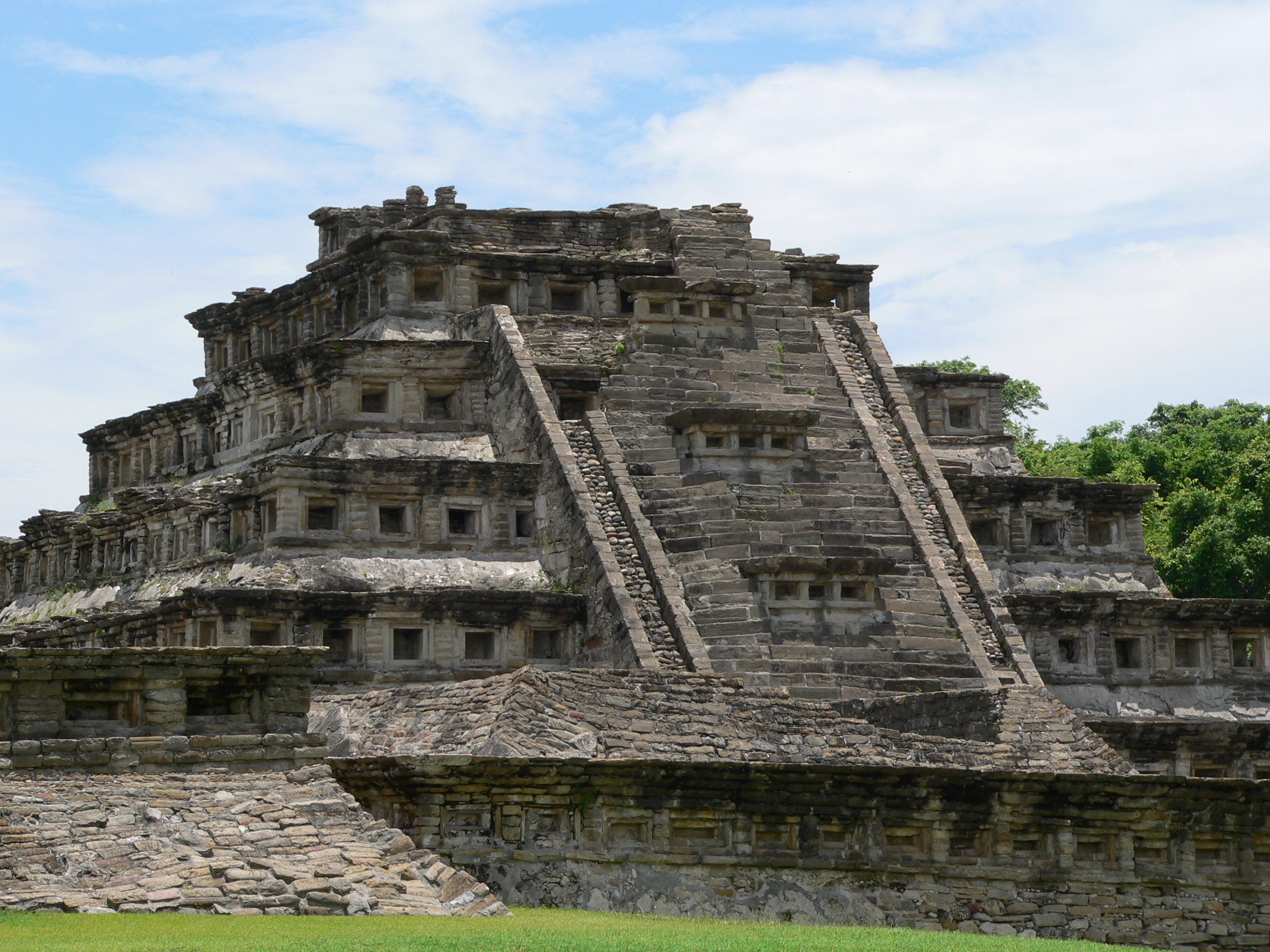
Pyramid of the Niches, El Tajín

The remnants of pre-Hispanic Huastec, Olmec, and Totonac sites can be found in Veracruz. The ruins of one city, El Tajín, the apex of which occurred between the 9th and 13th centuries CE, were designated a UNESCO World Heritage site in 1992.

- El Zapotal is an archeological site discovered in 1971 in the Mixtequilla region, between the Blanco (White) and Papaloapan Rivers. This site is noted for its clay figurines with smiling faces, part of an very large offering in honor of the god of death, Mictlantecuhtli.
- Cempoala is an archeological site located on the coast between the modern settlements of La Antigua (The Ancient) and Ciudad Cardel (Cardel City). It was occupied when Cortés arrived, and he managed to form an alliance with the Totonacs here against the Aztecs. In the center of the site is a large plaza surrounded by temples and the palace of the Totonac chief. There is also a small museum.
- Quiahuiztlán is on the coast on a small mountain named Bernal, cut into the mountain as a series of terraces, located very close to where Cortés founded the initial Spanish settlement of Villa Rica de la Vera-Cruz.
- The Castillo de Teayo (Teayo Castle) is really a pyramid, the original name of which was Zapotitlán, located on the border between Huasctec and Totonac lands. It was abandoned in the 19th century.
- El Tajín, located near the city of Papantla, is the largest and most important archeological site. The name is from the Totonac language and means "thunder," but no one knows what the true name of this city was. It is also unknown whether the Totonac built the site, but they lay claim to it because they have dominated the region for centuries. The city developed from the end of the Classic Period and the beginning of the Post-Classic Period, between 800 and 1150 CE. It is divided into five zones: the Plaza del Arroyo Group, the Central Zone, the Gran Xicalcoliuhqui (Great Xicalcoliuhqui), Tajín Chico (Little Tajín), and the Column Complex. Its signature building is the Pyramid of the Niches (see above), named after the 365 niches built into the levels of the structure. The site has a large number of Mesoamerican ball game courts, one with details reliefs showing the beheading of a ballplayer and his role in the afterlife.

The Tres Zapotes site is located the community of the same name. Covering 1.5 hectares (3.71 acres), the square-based main building is surrounded by gardens and trees. The most important find at this site is Stele C, won display at the Museo Nacional de Antropología (National Museum of Anthropology) in Mexico City, because it contains one of the oldest-known Mesoamerican Long Count dates.

El Pital, a site in the municipality of Martínez de la Torre, consists of a mound with a pyramid base and stairs on the east side. The culture of the site is considered a link between the coastal and highland cultures of the region.

Los Ídolos (The Idols), a site in the municipal city of Misantla, was an important ceremonial site for the Totonacapan region. It consists of four rectangular patios linked by platforms and flat-topped mounds. Many of the structures are decorated with smooth river stone, thought to have come from the Misantla River.

The Centro Ceremonial Cuajilote (Cuajilote Ceremonial Center), located on the Bobos River, consists of a large plaza 400 m (1,312.34 ft) long, lined with structures. In the center of the plaza are three shrines, one of which contains phallic figures.

== Administrative hierarchy ==
Veracruz was officially established as a state in 1824. Its government consists of a governor, elected to a single six-year term, and a unicameral State Congress, the members of which serve three-year terms.

The state is divided into 212 municipios (municipalities), the newest of which are the municipalities of San Rafael and Santiago Sochiapan, created in 2003. The municipalities are grouped into regions:

- Capital (33 municipalities)
- De las Montañas (57 municipalities)
- De los Tuxtlas (4 municipalities)
- Huasteca Alta (10 municipalities)
- Huasteca Baja (23 municipalities)
- Nautla (11 municipalities)
- Olmeca (25 municipalities)
- Papaloapan (22 municipalities)
- Sotavento (12 municipalities)
- Totonac (15 municipalities)

== Infrastructure ==
=== Transport ===
The road system in the state covers 16,039 km (9,966.2 mi), representing 5.1% of the roads nationwide. For each 100 sq km (38.6 sq mi) of territory, there are 22 km (13.7 mi) of roads. Of these 3,144.5 km (1,953.9 mi) are part of the federal highway system. State roads comprise 2,176 km (1,352.1 mi), and the rest are maintained by local authorities. Although there are over 3,000 km (1,864.1 mi) of rural roads, only 71.5 km (44.4 mi) are paved.

The state also contains 1,675.3 km (1,041.0 mi) of railway. Most of it is conceded by the federal government to private companies, including Kansas City Southern de México and Ferrosur, although strategic stretches of rail are maintained directly by the government. These lines are used almost exclusively for the transportation of freight, which in 1999 added up to 37 million tons. Three rail lines serve the port of Veracruz exclusively, and one is dedicated to the port of Coatzacalcos.

The ports of the state are Alvarado, Coatzacoalcos, Minatitlán-Nanchital, Nautla, Pajaritos, Tecolutla, Tlacotalpan, Tuxpan, and Veracruz. Coatzacoalcos, Tuxpan, and Veracruz are the ports for heavy cargo ships, with Veracruz the most important. The others are small ports for small ships, fishing boats, and tourism. All ports are operated privately except Pajaritos, which is operated by PEMEX. Port traffic in Veracruz accounts for 10% of all commercial traffic in the country, 23.4% of the port traffic of Mexico, and 21% of all port traffic in the Gulf of Mexico and Caribbean. Goods imported through the state reach 16 out of Mexico's 31 states plus Mexico City. The port of Veracruz alone handles over 12 million tons of freight per year. Coatzacoalcos is important for its handling of petroleum products.

The state contains three major airports. El Tajín in Tihuatlán, serving Poza Rica, and Canticas in Minatitlán provide national service; Heriberto Jara Corona in the city of Veracruz provides national and international service. There are also 31 smaller regional airfields in municipalities such as Acayucán, Cazones de Herrera, Córdoba, Indigenous, Juán Rodríguez Clara, Ozuluama, Platón Sánchez, Playa Vicente, Soconusco, Tamalín, Tamiahua, Tecolutla, Temapache, Tempoal, and Tierra Blanca.

=== Media ===
Fifty-nine local newspapers and 40 magazines are published in the state, includin El Dictamen (The Ruling); El Sol del Centro (The Sun of the Center); La Opinión de Minatitlán (The Minatitlán Opinion; Diario de Xalapa (Xalapa Daily); El Diario de Minatitlán (The Minatitlán Daily); El Mundo de Córdoba (The Córdoba World); El Mundo de Orizaba (The Orizaba World); El Sol de Córdoba (The Córdoba Sun); El Sol de Orizaba (The Orizaba Sun); Esto de Veracruz (The Situation in Veracruz); Imagen de Veracruz (The Image of Veracruz); La Jornada Veracruz (The Veracruz Day); La Opinión de Poza Rica (The Poza Rica Opinion); Liberal del Sur (Southern Liberal); Milenio El Portal (Milenio The Portal); Noreste Diario Regional Independiente (Northeast Independent Regional Daily); and Sotavento (Leeward).

According to many journalist organizations, Veracruz is one of the most dangerous places for journalists, especially after Governor Javier Duarte de Ochoa came to power in December 2010.

There are 202 radio stations in the state: 57 AM, 35 FM. Most are commercial or private, although some are operated by non-profits and governmental agencies. There are 22 television station, of which two channels are local, and the rest are repeaters from national broadcasters. Five companies provide cable and satellite television. The Mexican telecommunications agency Telmex controls over 75% of the telephone service in Veracruz state.

== Notable people ==
- Lorena Alarcon-Casas Wright, endocrinologist and associate professor at the University of Washington School of Medicine
- Raquel Torres Cerdán, anthropologist and restaurateur
- Eduardo Santamarina, telenovela actor
- Salma Hayek, actress and film producer
- Verónica Valerio, singer, harpist, and composer
- Adolfo Ruiz Cortines, president of Mexico from 1952 to 1958
- Irán Castillo, actress, singer

== See also ==
- Misantla Totonac
- Municipalities of Veracuz
