= Lorena Alarcon-Casas Wright =

Physician-endocrinologist

- Born: Veracruz, Mexico
- Education: Universidad Veracruzana (MD) University of Southern California (Residency) University of Washington (Fellowship)
- Occupations: Physician of Internal Medicine and Endocrinology, Diabetes, and Metabolism
- Known for: Clinical Director of the Latinx Diabetes Clinic at the UW Diabetes Institute Advocate for Latinx representation in Medicine Advocate for culturally appropriate healthcare for the Latinx community

Lorena Alarcon-Casas Wright (MD, FACE) is a physician (endocrinologist) and an Associate Professor at the University of Washington School of Medicine who serves as the Clinical Director of the LatinX Diabetes Clinic at UW Medicine's Diabetes Institute. Wright specializes in Metabolism, Endocrinology, and Nutrition at the UW Medical Center, Harborview Medical Center, and the UW Diabetes Institute Clinic.

In addition to clinical practice, Wright performs clinical research in different areas of Diabetes care. Wright cares about eradicating health disparities and promoting health equity.

== Early life and education ==
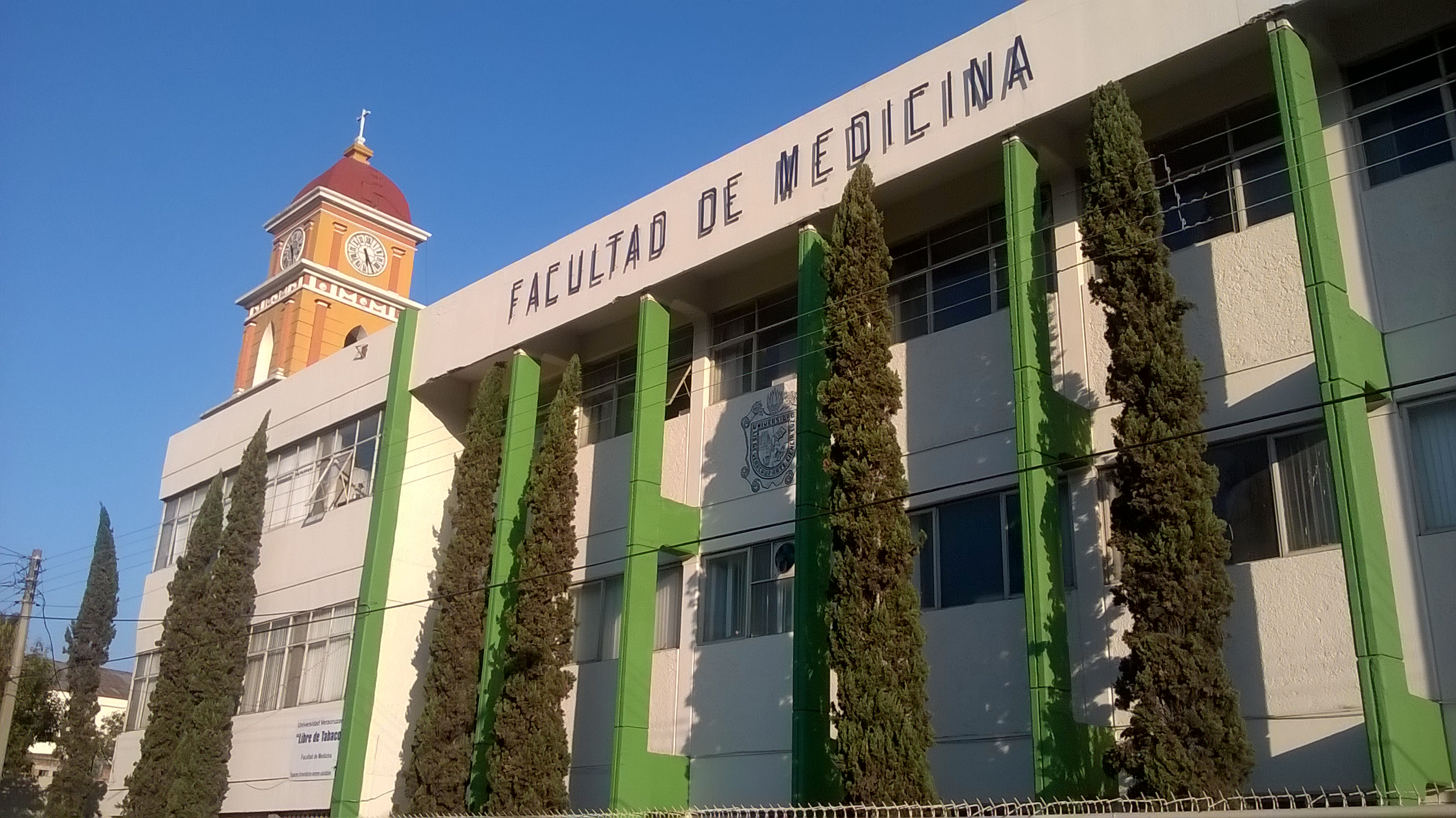
Universidad Veracruzana Facultad de Medicine (Faculty of Medicine) where Wright attended Medical School.

Wright was born in Veracruz, Mexico and grew up seeing many of her family members suffer from diabetes in her home country. This motivated Wright at a young age to provide care for people in the LatinX community with diabetes.

In 1994, Wright moved to France and attended the Université Bordeaux Montaigne. In 1996, she graduated with a Diplôme Superieur (Higher Diploma) in French studies.

Afterward, Wright moved back to her hometown in Mexico where she attended medical school at Universidad Veracruzana Facultad de Medicina (Faculty of Medicine). In 2004, she graduated with a medical degree (MD).

Following her MD, Wright moved to California and attended the University of Southern California, where she completed her medical Internship at the Santa Barbara Cottage Hospital in 2007. In 2009, Wright obtained her medical Residency at the same institution.

After completing her medical residency, Wright attended the University of Washington School of Medicine where she pursued her medical Fellowship under the Division of Metabolism/Endocrinology. Wright completed her medical fellowship in 2012 and has continued to practice medicine in the Seattle area.

== Personal life ==
Wright is fluent in English, Spanish, and French.

Outside of being a physician and scientist, Wright enjoys cooking and spending time with family, friends, and her pets. She also likes outdoor activities such as running and gardening.

== Career ==
Wright is a licensed physician in the states of Washington and California, and is a board certified physician in Internal Medicine and Endocrinology, Diabetes, and Metabolism. Wright has clinical experience and passions in Diabetes care and Transgender care. Currently, her most recognized work in the clinical setting is serving as a Clinical Director and physician at the LatinX Diabetes Clinic.

=== LatinX Diabetes Clinic ===
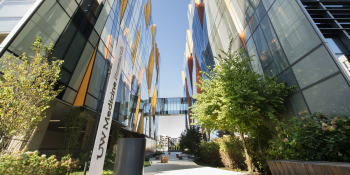
The UW Diabetes Institute located in South Lake Union, Seattle is home to the LatinX Diabetes Clinic.

Wright established the LatinX Diabetes Clinic in November 2020 at the UW Diabetes Institute, located in Seattle's South Lake Union. The LatinX Diabetes Clinic creates culturally sensitive care for LatinX patients with Diabetes. The clinic welcomes all LatinX patients, including those without a referral from a healthcare professional. The clinic is composed of physicians, like Wright, nutritionists, patient care specialists, and a clinic manager who are all bilingual in Spanish and English. With bilingual staff, the clinic aims to bridge the language barrier between clinical staff and LatinX patients. As a Clinical Associate Professor at UW Medicine, Wright is also using the LatinX Diabetes Clinic as a learning opportunity for medical students and residents. The goal is to teach medical students and residents about culturally appropriate care and social factors affecting prevention and management of Diabetes in the LatinX community.

==== Future plans for the LatinX Diabetes Clinic ====
The LatinX Diabetes Clinic plans on expanding and providing additional resources to its LatinX patients in the future. Planned improvements include hiring social workers who can help connect patients to social, nutritional, and financial support services, along with cultural navigators, who can aid in scheduling, transportation, and completing health forms for patients. Currently, the LatinX Diabetes Clinic is only open on Tuesdays from 7:45 am to 4:45 pm, but there are plans for the clinic to open its doors longer. Wright's future plan for the LatinX Diabetes Clinic includes connecting patients to clinical trials, which will help improve representation of LatinX populations in medical research. Another future plan for the LatinX Diabetes Clinic is creating community outreach.

Wright plans on using community outreach to expand the clinic's care to more LatinX people in Washington state. This plan comes at a critical time during the COVID-19 pandemic where people with Diabetes are more likely to suffer severe complications from COVID-19, and LatinX people are more likely to suffer from Diabetes in the United States. The LatinX Diabetes Clinic has started expanding to Harborview Medical Center and looks to reach rural communities in eastern Washington. Wright also plans on connecting the LatinX Diabetes Clinic with local churches and community leaders in order for patients to follow recommendations made by health professionals.

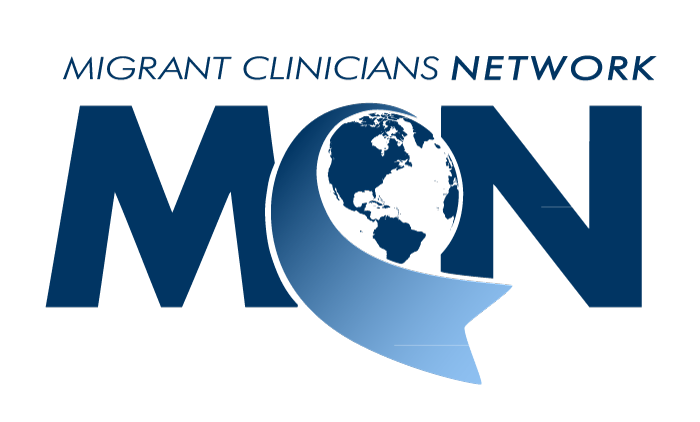
In May 2017, Wright collaborated with the Migrant Clinicians Network and Project ECHO to co-host a Webinar on Diabetes care and the control of Hypertension in rural settings.

=== UW Diabetes Institute ===
At the UW Diabetes Institute, Wright is member of the UW Diabetes ECHO Project, a partnership between the University of Washington and Project ECHO (Extension for Community Healthcare Outcomes). Wright is part of a team of Endocrinologists and physicians from different medical specialties like Psychiatry and Emergency Medicine to increase primary care provider and clinic access for underserved people with Diabetes in the WWAMI (Washington, Wyoming, Alaska, Montana, Idaho) region. The ECHO Project offers classes and trainings for primary care providers on the use of technology to strengthen primary care teams and centers in rural and urban settings. In May 2017, Wright and Dr. Maura Garcia hosted a webinar with Project ECHO and the Migrant Clinicians Network on the importance of clinical teams and community leaders to help control Hypertension, a major complication in Diabetes. The online course mainly focused on cases of Diabetes in rural areas of Texas.

=== LGBTQ+ Medicine ===
In addition to serving people with Diabetes, Wright serves many transgender patients at Harborview Medical Center and UW Roosevelt. Wright provides gender affirming hormone therapy for transgender patients and teaches medical students, residents, and fellows about transgender care. Wright serves the transgender community. She finds supporting her transgender patients towards their identified gender as a humbling and rewarding experience.

=== Academia ===
As an associate professor at University of Washington School of Medicine, Wright is also an instructor for medical and health professional students. Currently, she teaches FAMED 556, Spanish for the Health Professional, which is a 1 credit course teaching students basic and intermediate medical terms in Spanish and skills when performing physical exams on Spanish-speaking patients. The course also emphasizes cultural considerations when interacting with Spanish-speaking patients. This emphasis helps both the physician and patient feel more comfortable in a clinical setting.

== Advocacy work ==
In addition to Wright's health equity work at the LatinX Diabetes Clinic, she is also actively involved in increasing diversity in medical education. Wright does this by mentoring underrepresented pre-meds and medical students, and by serving as Chair of Equity, Diversity, and Inclusion at UW's Division of Metabolism, Endocrinology, and Nutrition. She is also a committee member of UW Medicine's Diversity Council. Wright has used her platform to speak on news outlets about the lack of LatinX physicians in Washington state and the lack of cultural awareness for LatinX patients. According to Wright, when it comes to eradicating health disparities that are disproportionately impacting LatinX communities in Diabetes care, knowledge of not just language but also culture is important. These inequities have led Wright to advocate for more LatinX Spanish-speaking doctors in the United States.

== Scientific contributions ==
Wright is also involved in clinical research mainly related to Diabetes care. She has published work covering a number of topics in Diabetes care such as management and treatment of Type 1 and Type 2 Diabetes, the impacts of pregnancy on patients with Diabetes, and Diabetes care for African-American and LatinX communities. Wright's scientific contributions to Diabetes care also includes research in health disparities. In 2018, Wright was the recipient of a $20,000 research grant by UW's Latino Center for Health for her pilot research titled, "Compañeros en Salud". The project tests the efficacy of a culturally sensitive Diabetes self-management program for LatinX patients in urban areas. Wright has shared her expertise in Diabetes care on various media outlets including U.S. News & World Report, STAT, and HealthCentral. On these media outlets, Wright has written about monitoring blood sugar levels in patients with Diabetes and has offered advice to people with Diabetes.

== Selected publications ==
- Wei ET, Koh E, Kelly MS, Wright LA, Tylee TS Patient errors in use of injectable antidiabetic medications: A need for improved clinic-based education. Journal of the American Pharmacists Association 2020 Sep - Oct; 60; 5; e76-e80;
- Wright LA, Hirsch IB Non-insulin treatments for Type 1 diabetes: critical appraisal of the available evidence and insight into future directions. Diabetic Medicine 2019 Jun; 36; 6; 665–678;
- Howe CG, Eckel SP, Habre R, Girguis MS, Gao L, Lurmann FW, Gilliland FD, Breton CV Association of Prenatal Exposure to Ambient and Traffic-Related Air Pollution With Newborn Thyroid Function: Findings From the Children's Health Study. JAMA Network Open 2018 Sep 7; 1; 5; e182172;
- Wright LA, Hirsch IB Metrics Beyond Hemoglobin A1C in Diabetes Management: Time in Range, Hypoglycemia, and Other Parameters. Diabetes Technology & Therapeutics 2017 May; 19; S2; S16-S26;
- Ruzevick J, Koh EK, Gonzalez-Cuyar LF, Cimino PJ, Moe K, Wright LA, Failor R, Ferreira M Clival paragangliomas: a report of two cases involving the midline skull base and review of the literature. Journal of Neuro-Oncology 2017 May; 132; 3; 473–478;
- Wright LA, Hirsch IB, Gooley TA, Brown Z 1,5-ANHYDROGLUCITOL AND NEONATAL COMPLICATIONS IN PREGNANCY COMPLICATED BY DIABETES. Endocrine Practice 2015 Jul; 21; 7; 725–33;
- Faulenbach MV, Wright LA, Lorenzo C, Utzschneider KM, Goedecke JH, Fujimoto WY, Boyko EJ, McNeely MJ, Leonetti DL, Haffner SM, Kahn SE, American Diabetes Association GENNID Study Group. Impact of differences in glucose tolerance on the prevalence of a negative insulinogenic index. Journal of Diabetes and Its Complications 2013 Mar-Apr; 27; 2; 158–61;
- Kahn SE, Suvag S, Wright LA, Utzschneider KM Interactions between genetic background, insulin resistance and β-cell function. Diabetes, Obesity & Metabolism 2012 Oct; 14 Suppl 3; 46–56;
- Marina AL, Utzschneider KM, Wright LA, Montgomery BK, Marcovina SM, Kahn SE Colesevelam improves oral but not intravenous glucose tolerance by a mechanism independent of insulin sensitivity and β-cell function. Diabetes Care 2012 May; 35; 5; 1119–25;
- Smits MM, Boyko EJ, Utzschneider KM, Leonetti DL, McNeely MJ, Suvag S, Wright LA, Fujimoto WY, Kahn SE Arm length is associated with type 2 diabetes mellitus in Japanese-Americans. Diabetologia 2012 Jun; 55; 6; 1679–84;
