= Coat of arms of Veracruz =

Coat of Arms of Veracruz

The coat of arms of the state of Veracruz is a representation of a legend of the conquest of New Spain.

== Symbolism ==
The following coat of arms is adopted as the emblem of the Free and Sovereign State of Veracruz Llave, whose heraldic characteristics are the following: A cut shield, the upper part in a sinople field and a gold tower superimposed on a Latin cross in gules, and in sable and in the center of it the word Vera, and below in a blue field the columns of Plus Ultra, a device that at the time was granted to the Villa de Veracruz as a high honor; the shield is bordered with thirteen azure stars in a gold field, and the whole is in the background of an ornamentation with its volutes and two intertwined flowery garlands.

=== Historical coats ===
The symbol is used by all successive regimes in Veracruz, in different forms.

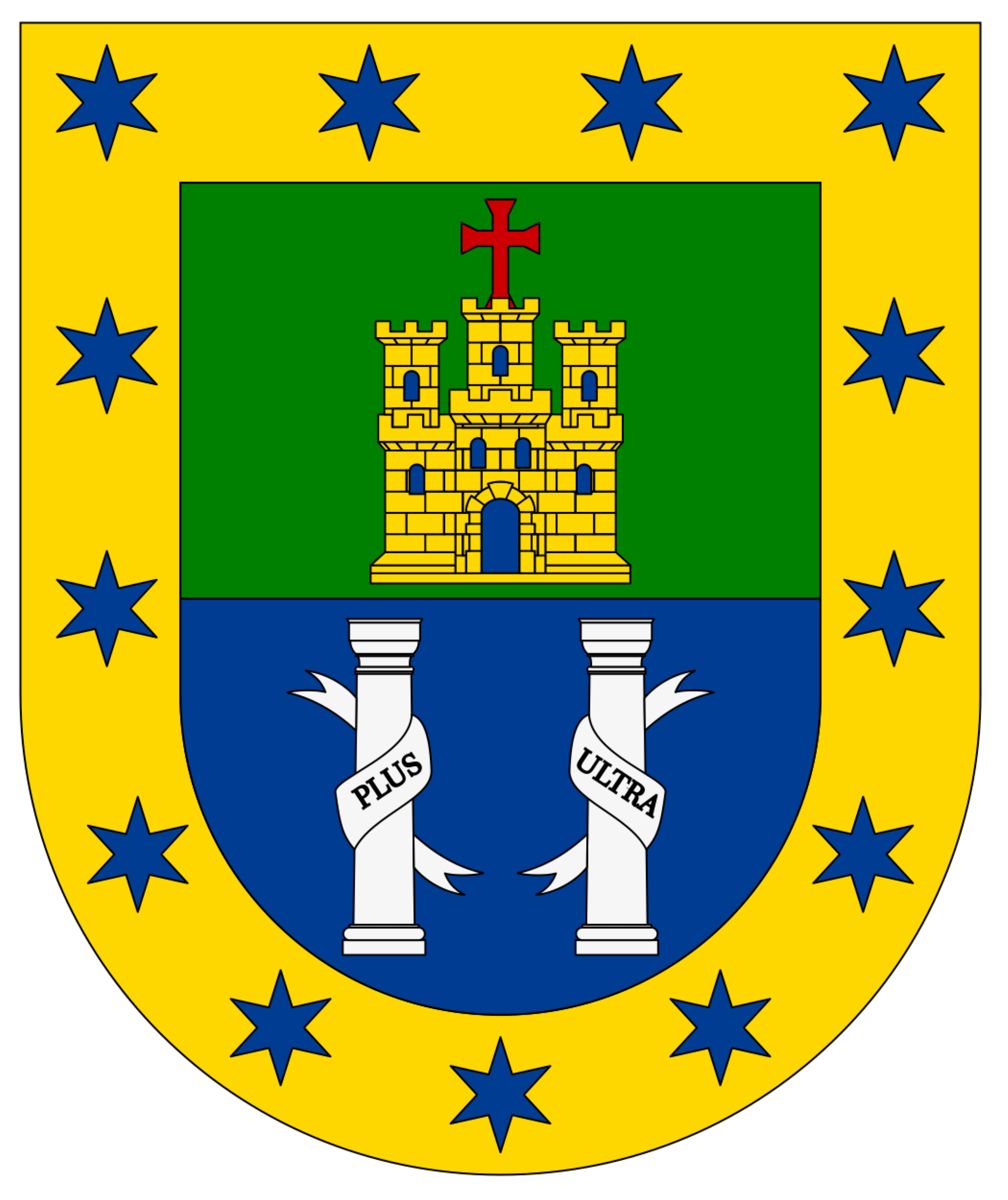
Coat of arms since 1712 to 1979.

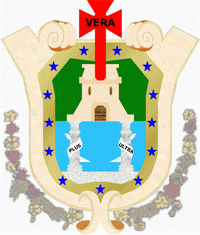
Coat of arms since 1979 to 2009.

Coat of arms since 2015.

== See also ==
- Coat of arms of Mexico
