= La Martucha =

Coordinates: 19°05′N 96°18′W

″La Martucha″ La Martucha is a community in the Mexican state, Veracruz de Ignacio de la Llave, part of Manlio Fabio Altamirano town. La Martucha is located in the central area of Sotaventoplainnear by Veracruz Port and about five kilometers southwest of the county seat, Manlio Fabio Altamirano. La Martucha has 19 ° 04 ' 39 " N and 96 ° 17'36 " W geographic coordinates, at an altitude of 30 meters above sea level. According to the results with the 2005 Census of Population and Housing conducted by the National Institute of Statistics and Geography. The population of Martucha is a total of 83 citizens, which 42 are men and 41 are women. On September 17, 2010, La Martucha town was severely affected by the flooding of the nearby river, Jamapa, which destroyed about 80% of buildings, as a consequence of heavy rainfall, Hurricane Karl.
