= Ángel R. Cabada (municipality) =

- Municipality
- Municipality of Ángel R. Cabada
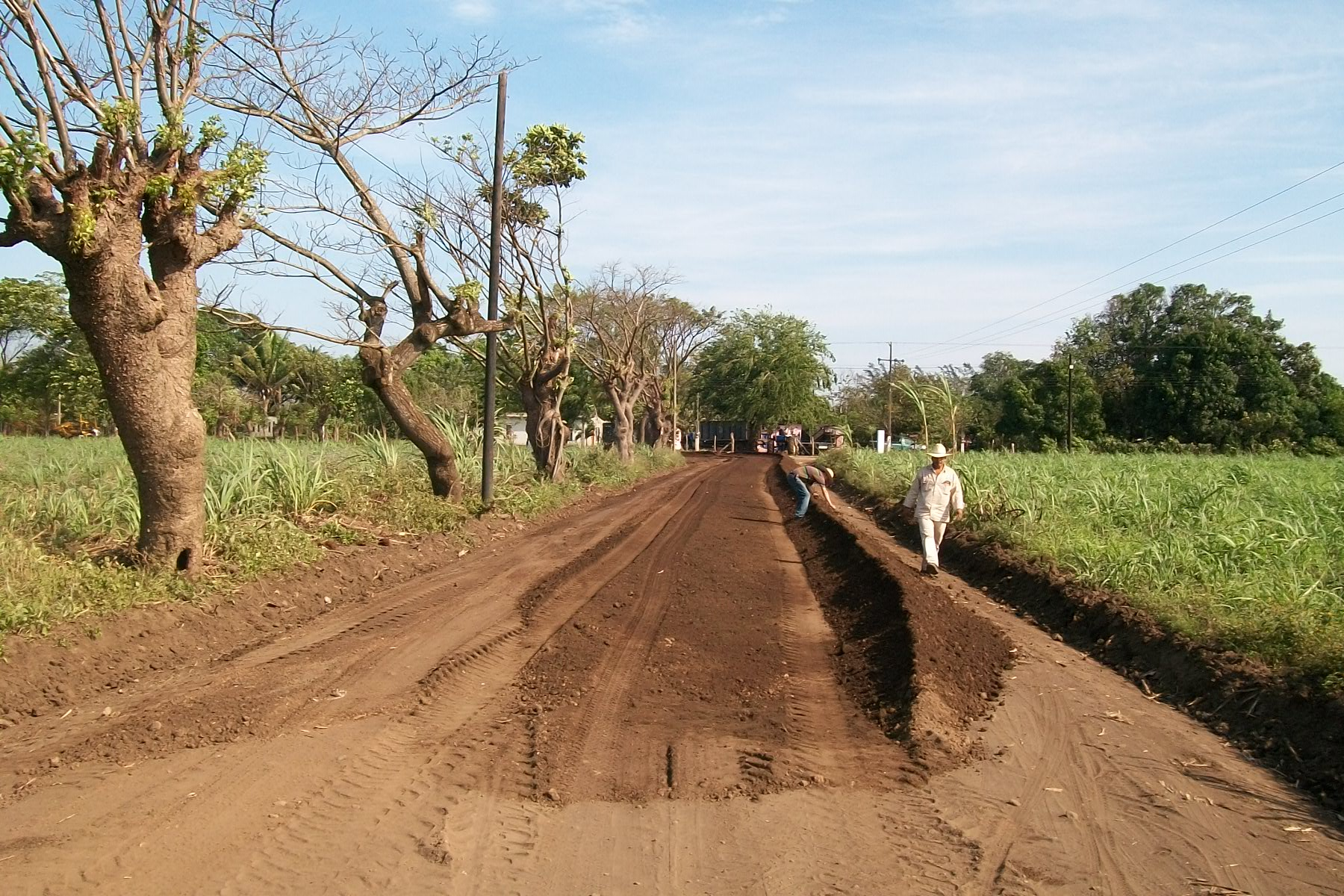
- Road in Ángel R. Cabada

- Coat of arms

- Location in Mexico Ángel R. Cabada (Mexico)
- Coordinates: 18°36′N 95°27′W
- Country: Mexico
- State: Veracruz
- Region: Papaloapan
- Named for: Ángel Rosario Cabada
- Municipal seat: Ángel R. Cabada

Government
  - Mayor: Julio César García Machucho (2022-2025)

Area
  - Total: 497.63 km^{2} (192.14 sq mi)

Population (2020)
  - Total: 33,839
  - Density: 68.000/km^{2} (176.12/sq mi)

Ángel R. Cabada is a municipality in the Mexican state of Veracruz. The municipal seat is at Ángel R. Cabada.

The municipality of Ángel R. Cabada is located about 207 km southeast from the state capital Xalapa, and is in the Papaloapan River region between Lerdo de Tejada and San Andrés Tuxtla on the Federal Highway. It is bordered to the north by the Gulf of Mexico, to the south by Santiago Tuxtla, and to the west by Saltabarranca and Lerdo de Tejada.

The municipality produces maize and beans.
