= Pueblo a Pueblo =

- Formation: 2001
- Legal status: 501(c)(3)
- Purpose: Provides programs in health, education, and food security in rural communities in Latin America

Pueblo a Pueblo is a 501(c)(3) organization that provides programs in health, education, and food security in rural communities in Latin America, especially Mayan communities in Guatemala.

== Background ==
Pueblo a Pueblo is a 501(c) organization launched in 2001 to provide educational opportunities for children in rural Mayan communities in Guatemala.

== Hospital ==
Pueblo a Pueblo received international mention in 2005 for relief efforts in the aftermath of Hurricane Stan in which a mudslide swept through Panabaj, leaving over 200 people dead and 300 missing. Six months prior, Pueblo a Pueblo had facilitated refurbishment, reopening and staffing of a local hospital closed for 15 years because of the civil war. Pueblo a Pueblo helped establish a local firefighting group to drive emergency relief, and provided education scholarships for students in families that relocated to Chuk Muk, a settlement east of Santiago along the shore of Lake Atitlán.

== Schools ==
Since 2005, Pueblo a Pueblo has started programs in health, education, and food security for communities in rural Guatemala like Panabaj. It focuses on coffee communities and works mostly out of primary schools.

== Awards ==
In 2013, Pueblo a Pueblo was awarded the Specialty Coffee Association of America's Sustainability Award for its Organic School Garden Project, which introduces primary school children to the basics of nutrition and sustainable agriculture.

Pueblo a Pueblo has been featured in magazines such as Fresh Cup, Coffee Talk, The Specialty Coffee Chronicle and Qué Pasa.

In 2012–13 Pueblo a Pueblo was chosen by Catalogue for Philanthropy as one of 24 high-impact non-profit organizations in the greater Washington, DC area.

== Funding ==
Pueblo a Pueblo is funded by Green Mountain Coffee Roasters, the Research Triangle Institute, and by a number of small foundations and individuals.
