= 19th federal electoral district of Veracruz =

Federal electoral district of Mexico

Veracruz's 19th
- Electoral district of the Chamber of Deputies of Mexico

- 19th district since 2023

Incumbent
- Member: Paola Tenorio Adame
- Party: ▌Morena
- Congress: 66th (2024–2027)

District
- State: Veracruz
- Head town: San Andrés Tuxtla
- Coordinates: 18°27′N 95°12′W
- Covers: Ángel R. Cabada, Catemaco, Hueyapan de Ocampo, Mecayapan, Pajapan, San Andrés Tuxtla, Santiago Tuxtla, Soteapan, Tatahuicapan
- PR region: Third
- Precincts: 217
- Population: 429,137 (2020 census)

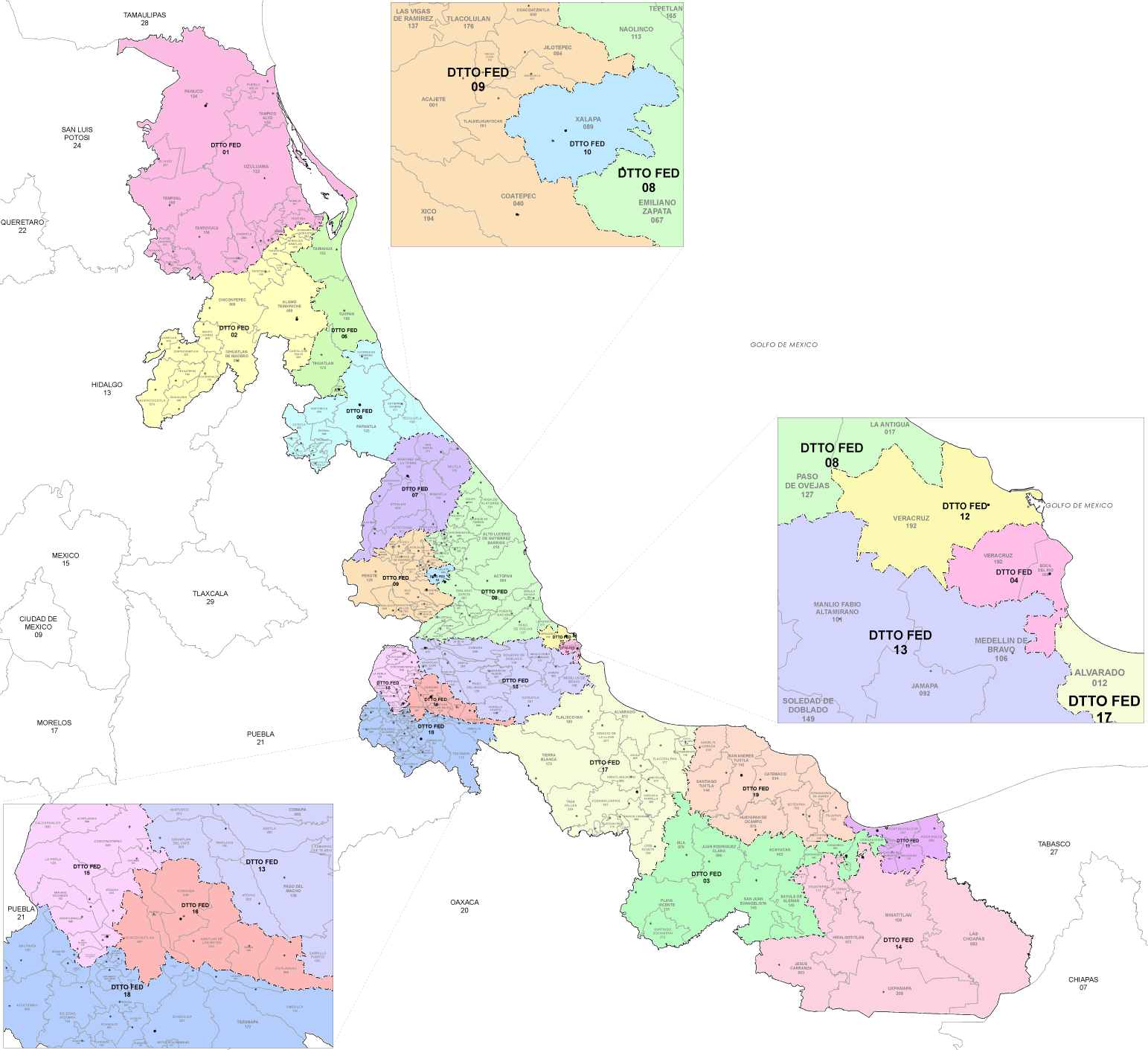
Veracruz's 2023 districts

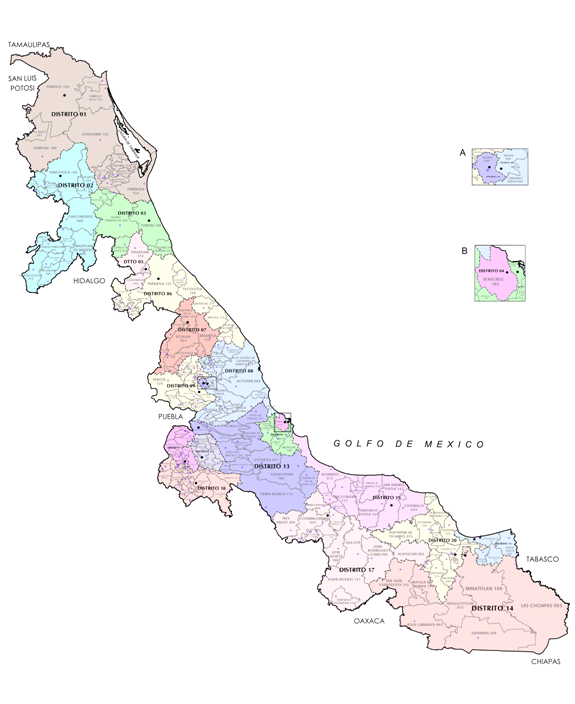
Veracruz under the 2017–2022 districting plan

The 19th federal electoral district of Veracruz (Spanish: Distrito electoral federal 19 de Veracruz) is one of the 300 electoral districts into which Mexico is divided for elections to the federal Chamber of Deputies and one of 19 such districts in the state of Veracruz.

It elects one deputy to the lower house of Congress for each three-year legislative session by means of the first-past-the-post system. Votes cast in the district also count towards the calculation of proportional representation ("plurinominal") deputies elected from the third region.

The 19th district was re-established in 1978 and was first contested in the 1979 mid-term election.

The current member for the district, re-elected in the 2024 general election, is Paola Tenorio Adame of the National Regeneration Movement (Morena).

== District territory ==
Veracruz lost a congressional district in the 2023 districting plan adopted by the National Electoral Institute (INE), which is to be used for the 2024, 2027 and 2030 elections. The reconfigured 19th district covers 217 electoral precincts (secciones electorales) across nine municipalities in the state's southern Papaloapan and Los Tuxtlas regions:

- Ángel R. Cabada, Catemaco, Hueyapan de Ocampo, Mecayapan, Pajapan, San Andrés Tuxtla, Santiago Tuxtla, Soteapan and Tatahuicapan.

The head town (cabecera distrital), where results from individual polling stations are gathered together and tallied, is the city of San Andrés Tuxtla. The district reported a population of 429,137 in the 2020 census.

== Previous districting schemes ==
Evolution of electoral district numbers
	1974	1978	1996	2005	2017	2023
Veracruz	15	23	23	21	20	19
Chamber of Deputies	196	300				

Because of shifting demographics, Veracruz currently has four fewer districts than the 23 the state was allocated under the 1977 electoral reforms.

2017–2022

Between 2017 and 2022, Veracruz was assigned 20 electoral districts. The 19th district comprised ten municipalities:
- Catemaco, San Andrés Tuxtla and Santiago Tuxtla (in the Los Tuxtlas region) and Acula, Alvarado, Amatitlán, Angel R. Cabada, Lerdo de Tejada, Saltabarranca and Tlacotalpan (in the Papaloapan region).
The head town was the city of San Andrés Tuxtla.

2005–2017

Veracruz's allocation of congressional seats fell to 21 in the 2005 redistricting process. Between 2005 and 2017 the 19th district had its head town at San Andrés Tuxtla and it comprised nine municipalities in the same region as the later schemes:
- Acula, Amatitlán, Angel R. Cabada, Catemaco, Lerdo de Tejada, Saltabarranca, San Andrés Tuxtla, Santiago Tuxtla and Tlacotalpan.

1996–2005

Under the 1996 districting plan, which assigned Veracruz 23 districts, the head town was at San Andrés Tuxtla and the district covered 19 municipalities.

1978–1996

The districting scheme in force from 1978 to 1996 was the result of the 1977 electoral reforms, which increased the number of single-member seats in the Chamber of Deputies from 196 to 300. Under that plan, Veracruz's seat allocation rose from 15 to 23. The newly created 19th district had its head town at Martínez de la Torre, to the north of the state capital at Xalapa, and it covered the municipalities of Altotonga, Jalacingo, Martínez de la Torre, Tecolutla and Tlapacoyan.

== Deputies returned to Congress ==
(Mexico) National parties
- Current
- PAN
- PRI
- PT
- PVEM
- MC
- Morena
- PAZ
- Somos
- Defunct or local only
- PLM
- PNR
- PRM
- PNM
- PP
- PPS
- PARM
- PFCRN
- CON
- PANAL
- PSD
- PES
- PES
- PRD

Veracruz's 19th district
Election	Deputy	Party	Term	Legislature
1916	Fernando A. Pereira		1916–1917	Constituent Congress of Querétaro
1917	Pablo Medina		1917–1918	27th Congress
1918	Juan Manuel Giffard		1918–1920	28th Congress
1920	Aurelio P. Márquez		1920–1922	29th Congress
1922	José Manuel Puig Casauranc		1922–1924	30th Congress
...
1979	Gonzalo Morgado Huesca	Institutional Revolutionary Party	1979–1982	51st Congress
1982	Roque Spinoso Foglia (Note: Spinoso Foglia was murdered on 25 November 1984.); Seth Cardeña Luna	Institutional Revolutionary Party	1982–1984; 1984–1985	52nd Congress
1985	Cirilo José Rincón Aguilar	Institutional Revolutionary Party	1985–1988	53rd Congress
1988	Luis Antonio Pérez Fraga	Institutional Revolutionary Party	1988–1991	54th Congress
1991	Froylán Ramírez Lara	Institutional Revolutionary Party	1991–1994	55th Congress
1994	Primo Rivera Torres	Institutional Revolutionary Party	1994–1997	56th Congress
1997	Augusto Carrión Álvarez	Institutional Revolutionary Party	1997–2000	57th Congress
2000	Nemesio Domínguez Domínguez	Institutional Revolutionary Party	2000–2003	58th Congress
2003	Jorge Uscanga Escobar	Institutional Revolutionary Party	2003–2006	59th Congress
2006	Nemesio Domínguez Domínguez	Institutional Revolutionary Party	2006–2009	60th Congress
2009	Fernando Santa María Prieto	National Action Party (Mexico)	2009–2012	61st Congress
2012	Marina Garay Cabada	Institutional Revolutionary Party	2012–2015	62nd Congress
2015	Jorge Carvallo Delfín	Institutional Revolutionary Party	2015–2018	63rd Congress
2018	Paola Tenorio Adame	National Regeneration Movement	2018–2021	64th Congress
2021	Paola Tenorio Adame	National Regeneration Movement	2021–2024	65th Congress
2024	Paola Tenorio Adame	National Regeneration Movement	2024–2027	66th Congress

== Presidential elections ==
Veracruz's 19th district
Election	District won by	Party or coalition	%
2018	Andrés Manuel López Obrador	Juntos Haremos Historia	51.0058
2024	Claudia Sheinbaum Pardo	Sigamos Haciendo Historia	68.9877
