= Cabada =

Cabada is a Spanish surname, prevalent in Mexico and the United States. Notable people with this surname include:

- Ángel Rosario Cabada (1872–1921), Mexican agrarian leader
- Fernando Cabada Jr. (born 1982), Mexican-American distance runner
- Héctor Armando Cabada Alvídrez (born 1967), Mexican politician
- Javier Cabada (born 1931), Spanish-American artist
- Marina Garay Cabada (born 1953), Mexican politician
- Moisés Cabada (born 1985), Peruvian footballer
