= Nemesio =

Nemesio, from the Spanish name for Nemesis, is a Spanish given name. Notable people with the name include:

- Nemesio Camacho (1869–1929), Colombian businessman and politician
- Nemesio Canales (1878–1923), Puerto Rican writer and politician
- Nemesio E. Caravana (1901–?), Filipino film director and actor
- Nemesio Antúnez (1918–1993), Chilean painter
- Nemesio Rivera Meza (1918–2007), Peruvian Roman Catholic bishop
- Nemesio Prudente (1927–2008), Filipino educator and activist
- Nemesio Fernández-Cuesta (1928–2009), Spanish businessman, journalist and politician
- Nemesio Jiménez (born 1946), Spanish cyclist
- Nemesio Miranda (born 1949), Filipino painter
- Nemesio Domínguez Domínguez (born 1950), Mexican politician
- Nemesio Oseguera Cervantes (1966–2026), Suspected founder and leader of multinational drug cartel CJNG

== See also ==
- Vitorino Nemésio (1901–1978), Portuguese writer and intellectual
