= Hurricane Stan =

Category 1 Atlantic hurricane in 2005

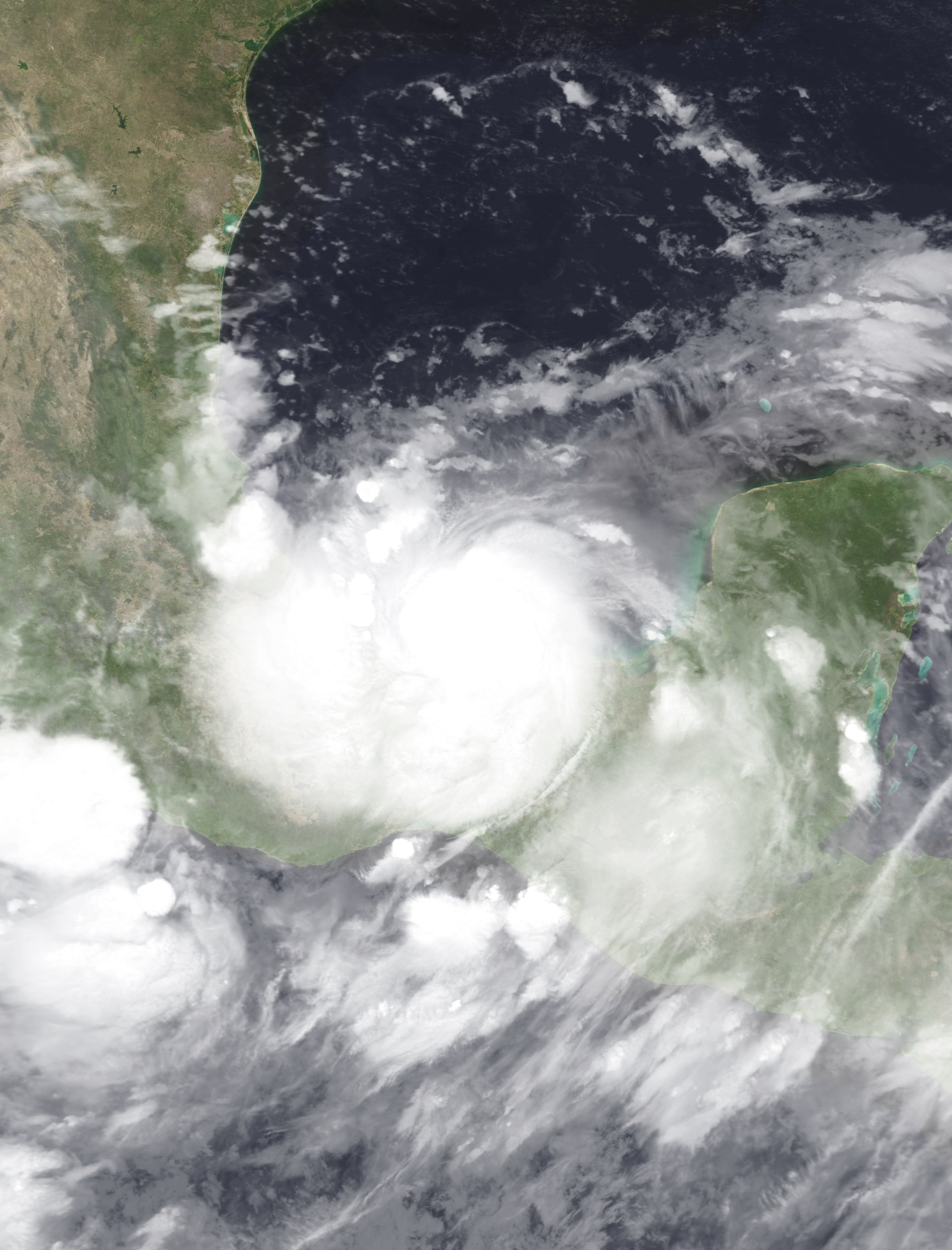
- Hurricane Stan at peak intensity while northeast of Veracruz on October 4

Meteorological history
- Formed: October 1, 2005
- Dissipated: October 5, 2005

Category 1 hurricane
- 1-minute sustained (SSHWS/NWS)
- Highest winds: 80 mph (130 km/h)
- Lowest pressure: 977 mbar (hPa); 28.85 inHg

Overall effects
- Fatalities: 1,673 (Note: 80-100 of the deaths were estimated to have been as a result of Stan; the rest were not caused by Stan itself but were the result of the large system of non-tropical rains that had spawned the hurricane.)
- Damage: $3.96 billion (2005 USD)
- Areas affected: Costa Rica, Nicaragua, Honduras, El Salvador, Belize, Guatemala, Yucatan Peninsula and Southern Mexico
- IBTrACS
- Part of the 2005 Atlantic hurricane season

Hurricane Stan was the deadliest tropical cyclone of the 2005 Atlantic hurricane season. A relatively weak system that affected areas of Central America and Mexico in early October 2005, Stan was the eighteenth named storm and eleventh hurricane of the 2005 season, having formed from a tropical wave on October 1 after it had moved into the western Caribbean. The depression slowly intensified, and reached tropical storm intensity the following day, before subsequently making its first landfall on the Yucatán Peninsula. While traversing the peninsula, the tropical storm weakened, but was able to re-intensify once it entered the Bay of Campeche. Under favorable conditions for tropical cyclogenesis, Stan attained hurricane strength on October 4, and later reached peak intensity with winds of 80 mph (130 km/h) and a minimum barometric pressure of 977 mbar (28.9 inHg). The hurricane maintained this intensity until landfall in the Mexican state of Veracruz later the same day. Once over the mountainous terrain of Mexico, however, Stan quickly weakened, and dissipated on October 5.

Due to Stan's position within a large area of convective activity and thunderstorms, the hurricane's effects were far-reaching and widespread across Central America. Flash floods generated by the hurricane caused severe crop losses, particularly to coffee crops. Overall, Stan caused at least 1,673 deaths across six countries, with many others unaccounted for. Most of these fatalities occurred in Guatemala, and were mostly caused by mudslides triggered by torrential rainfall. The floods in Guatemala destroyed entire towns and disrupted exportation of petroleum. In Mexico, the heavy rains triggered additional mudslides and caused rivers to overflow, flooding nearby villages. Despite being relatively far from Stan as opposed to other countries, El Salvador was also severely affected by the hurricane. The Santa Ana Volcano erupted while Stan was producing heavy rains in the country, which contributed to the damage already wrought by mudslides. Transportation in the country was disrupted. Across the region, Stan caused $3.9 billion in damages, primarily due to torrential rainfall.

== Meteorological history ==
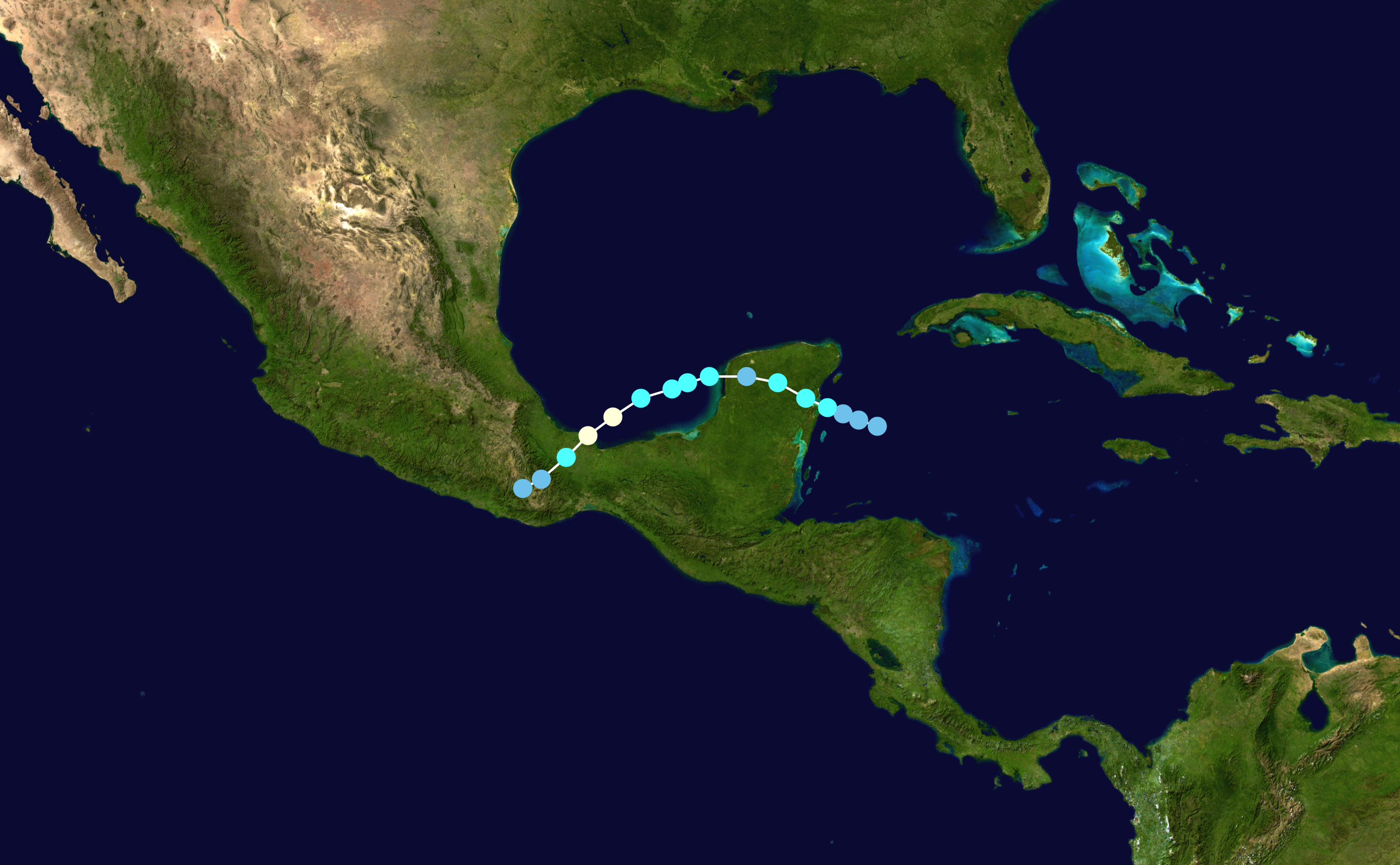
Map plotting the storm's track and intensity, according to the Saffir–Simpson scale Map key Saffir–Simpson scale Tropical depression (≤38 mph, ≤62 km/h) Tropical storm (39–73 mph, 63–118 km/h) Category 1 (74–95 mph, 119–153 km/h) Category 2 (96–110 mph, 154–177 km/h) Category 3 (111–129 mph, 178–208 km/h) Category 4 (130–156 mph, 209–251 km/h) Category 5 (≥157 mph, ≥252 km/h) Unknown Storm type Tropical cyclone Subtropical cyclone Extratropical cyclone, remnant low, tropical disturbance, or monsoon depression

A tropical wave left the west coast of Africa on 17 September 2005, which the US National Hurricane Center (NHC) considered the likely origin of Hurricane Stan. For several days, the wave moved westward across the tropical Atlantic Ocean without any signs of development. The associated thunderstorms, or convection, increased on September 22, although the presence of wind shear prevented further organization. The wave entered the eastern Caribbean Sea on September 25. Around that time, the NHC identified the wave in their tropical weather outlook, noting that "any development [would] be slow to occur." The thunderstorms became more consolidated by September 27, as upper-level conditions became more favorable. The system's organization fluctuated, developing a weak circulation and broad low-pressure area on September 28 over the western Caribbean Sea. The Hurricane Hunters flew into the system on September 29, observing a broad area of thunderstorms with insufficient organization to be classified a tropical cyclone. Over several days, the system failed to consolidate and was "slowly festering", as described by NHC forecaster Stacy Stewart. On October 1, the circulation became more defined, developing into Tropical Depression Twenty about 215 km (130 mi) southeast of Cozumel.

Upon its development, the depression's circulation was broad, with several small vorticities. The associated convection developed outflow as the overall system moved generally westward, steered by a ridge over the northern coast of the Gulf of Mexico. The NHC anticipated that the system's passage over the Yucatán Peninsula would tighten the wind field and allow for further development in the Bay of Campeche. Early on October 2, the depression intensified into Tropical Storm Stan, and at 10:00 UTC that day it made landfall in eastern Mexico near Punta Hualaxtoc, Mexico, roughly 35 mi (55 km) south of Tulum. For much of its duration, Stan was associated with a Central American gyre, which was a much larger circulation covering eastern Mexico and Central America. After moving ashore the Yucatán, Stan traversed the peninsula in about 18 hours, emerging into the Bay of Campeche as a tropical depression on October 3.

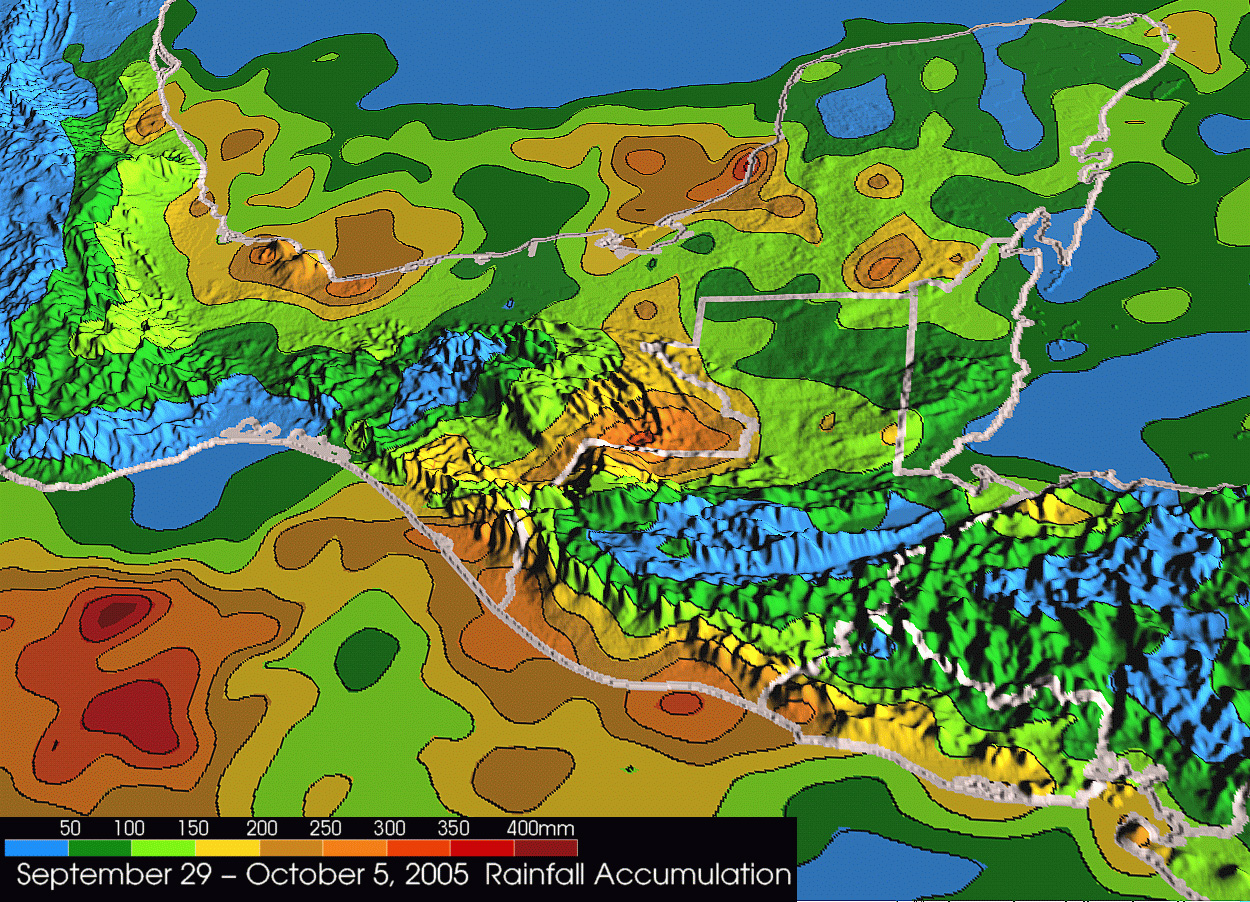
Tropical Rainfall Measuring Mission estimate of rainfall from Hurricane Stan; 29 September – 5 October

After emerging into the Bay of Campeche, Stan had a well-defined circulation with an anticyclone aloft, and was moving over an area of nearly 30 °C (86 °F) waters. Thunderstorms soon redeveloped, and the depression quickly reattained tropical storm status. A strong area of high pressure over the western Gulf of Mexico forced the storm to turn southwestward, back to the Mexican coastline. Initially, the convection was mostly limited to the eastern periphery. Early on October 4, the convection increased significantly over the center as well-defined rainbands organized into an eyewall. At 06:00 UTC that day, Stan intensified into a hurricane, and around that time it turned more to the southwest. Six hours later, the hurricane made landfall in the Mexican state of Veracruz near Punta Roca Partida, about 150 km (90 mi) east-southeast of the city of Veracruz. It was the first hurricane landfall in the state since Hurricane Gert in 1993. Stan moved ashore with sustained winds of 80 mph (130 km/h), and a minimum pressure of 28.85 inHg. The storm rapidly weakened over the mountainous terrain, and Stan dissipated early on October 5 over the state of Oaxaca.

== Preparations ==
After Stan's development, the Government of Mexico issued tropical storm warnings from Chetumal to Cabo Catoche along the eastern Yucatán peninsula, with a tropical storm watch issued westward to the city of Campeche. These were dropped after Stan moved over the Yucatán peninsula. After the storm moved over the Bay of Campeche, Mexico issued hurricane warnings between Cabo Rojo to Punta El Lagarto on October 3, about 27 hours before landfall. Additional warnings were expanded to include more of the coast. The NHC had anticipated that landfall would not occur for 48 hours; it later wrote that the agency had "not predicted very well", describing the southwest path as "unexpected".

Ahead of the storm, state oil company Pemex evacuated 270 employees from five platforms in the Gulf of Mexico, while also closing three oil exporting ports.

In Veracruz state where Stan moved ashore, about 38,000 people evacuated their homes, utilizing thousands of shelters. Schools were canceled in the state. Elsewhere, about 600 families evacuated in Chiapas in areas near the Guatemalan border.

Some 100,000 inhabitants of the Sierra de los Tuxtlas region on the Gulf Coast were evacuated from their homes, and incidents of mild flooding as well as wind damage (such as uprooted trees and roofs ripped off houses) were reported from coastal areas of Veracruz, including the port of Veracruz, Boca del Río, San Andrés Tuxtla, Santiago Tuxtla, Minatitlán and Coatzacoalcos, as well as state capital Xalapa further inland. The armed forces evacuated the inhabitants of a dozen or so towns on the coastal plain, between World Heritage Site Tlacotalpan in the west and the lakeside resort of Catemaco in the east.

== Impact ==
Impact by country
Country	Fatalities	Damage (USD)	Refs
Costa Rica	1	20 million	
El Salvador	69	356 million	
Guatemala	1,513	996 million	
Honduras	7	100 million	
Mexico	80	2.5 billion	
Nicaragua	3	N/A	
Total	1,673	3.96 billion	

Throughout its duration, Hurricane Stan was embedded within a larger Central American gyre, which resulted in a large area of thunderstorms across Mexico and Central America. This led to torrential rainfall and flooding that killed thousands of people, mostly in Guatemala.

Hundreds were reported missing and were feared dead throughout the region. One estimate put the death toll above 2,000 in Guatemala alone. The final death toll will likely never be known due to the extensive decomposition of bodies in the mud.

Greenpeace blamed rampant deforestation for exacerbating the disaster, and called on governments to do more to protect local woods and mangroves. The United Nations and the Center for International Forestry Research deny the claim that the heavy flooding was caused by deforestation.

=== Mexico ===
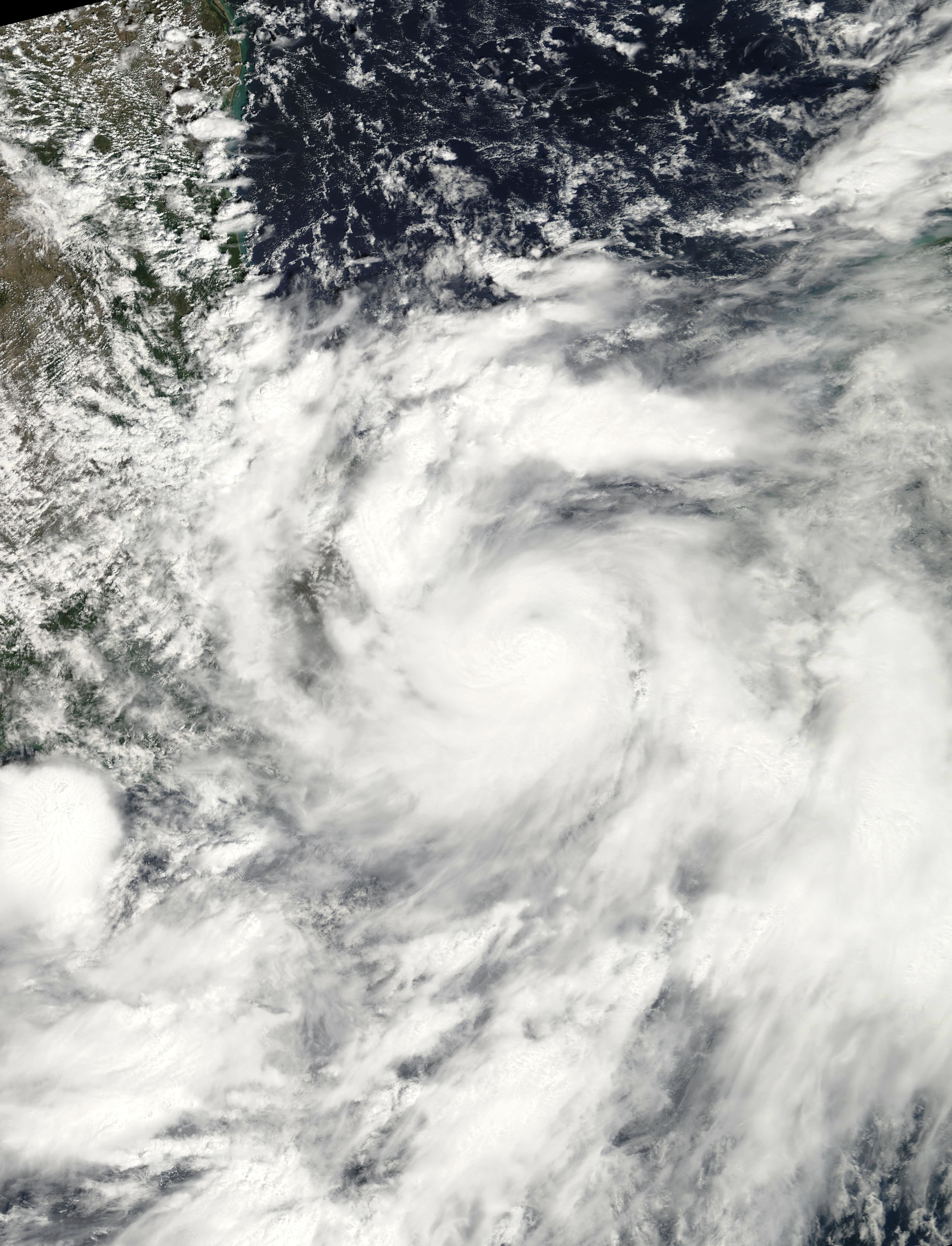
Hurricane Stan over the state of Veracruz in October 4

Across southeastern Mexico, Hurricane Stan dropped heavy rainfall, resulting in damaging floods that killed 98 people. The hurricane produced a peak 24 hour rainfall total of 307 mm (12.1 in) in Novillero, Chiapas. When it struck the Yucatán, Stan became the record sixth storm of the year to hit Mexico. As it moved across the peninsula, it dropped 137.5 mm (5.41 in) of precipitation in Cancún. The storm produced floods and landslides across eight states in southeastern Mexico, with the most severe effects in Chiapas, Veracruz, Oaxaca, Puebla and Quintana Roo. The hurricane's damage across the five states was estimated at Mex$13.7 billion (US$1.28 billion), with the most damage and fatalities occurring in Chiapas, where 86 people died. In addition to the direct damage, Stan resulted in another Mex$7.29 billion (US$670 million) worth of indirect damages, such as loss of productivity to businesses. Across the region, the hurricane damaged 55,038 houses, as well as 1,553 schools, and had damaging effects to an estimated 326,621.1 hours (1,175,836 ks) worth of crops or grasslands. Stan's passage also disrupted the transportation network, damaging 17,569.5 km (10,917.2 mi) worth of roadways.

The most damage and fatalities occurred in Chiapas, where the rainfall amounts were six times the October average. In mountainous portions of the state, the intense rainfall caused 98 rivers to overflow. Floods and mudslides affected much of Chiapas, with monetary damage costs estimated at Mex$8.8 billion (US$819 million), representing about 5% of the state's Gross Domestic Product (GDP). An additional Mex$6.2 billion (US$582 million) in economic losses resulted from loss of productivity caused by the hurricane's effects. The hurricane damaged or destroyed 32,514 houses, and flooded thousands more, which displaced about 92,000 people from their homes, with the most damage in Tapachula, Huixtla, Siltepec, and Motozintla. About 68% of the damaged houses occurred in small towns in rural areas. Officials opened 41 emergency shelters across the state, which housed 83,825 people. The storm also damaged 2,307 businesses, mostly impacting machinery and the supplies of small companies. Disrupted or blocked roads temporarily isolated about 700,000 people, which impacted search-and-rescue efforts, with 38 bridges damaged. The hurricane also damaged 114 health centers, including six rural clinics that were destroyed. Of the 305 schools damaged across the state, 111 were destroyed, with 12% of the students across Chiapas affected by the storm. Water and sewage systems were also damaged, affecting 353,000 people. The storm knocked down 2,300 power poles and another 585 transmission towers across the state, affecting more than 81,000 people. The floods inundated the boardwalk at Chiapa de Corzo with 1 m (3.3 ft) of mud. Across the state, the storm heavily damaged the corn, coffee, and banana crops, while also killing thousands of livestock and beehives.

Outside of Chiapas, the hurricane damage was heaviest in the state of Veracruz, with economic costs estimated at Mex$2.535 billion (US$236 million). Rainfall in the state reached 566 mm (22.3 in) at a station called El Tejar, located near where Stan moved ashore.

As a tropical storm, Stan brought torrential rainfall and gusty winds to parts of the Yucatán Peninsula. Flash flooding took place in several areas; however, no loss of life was reported.

As the system progressed inland towards the Sierra Madre del Sur to the west of the Isthmus of Tehuantepec, the states of Oaxaca and Chiapas were affected with torrential rains.

Some areas in the Sierra Norte, in the central state of Puebla, were also flooded. Three people died in a mudslide at Xochiapulco Hill.

The Ministry of the Interior declared states of emergency in the worst hit municipalities of five states: Chiapas, Hidalgo, Oaxaca, Puebla, and Veracruz. According to Mexican president Vicente Fox, Hurricane Stan wrought roughly 20 billion pesos (US$1.9 billion) in damage throughout the country.

=== Guatemala ===
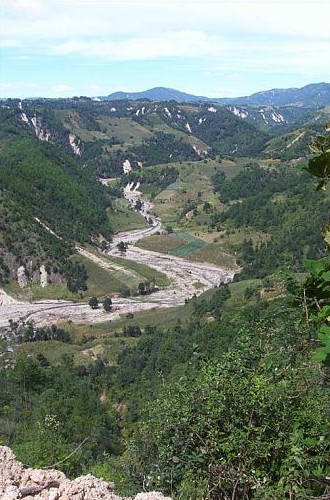
Landslides affecting infrastructure, crops, and water sources in Guatemala

By 11 October 2005, at least 1,500 people were confirmed to have died, and up to 3,000 were believed missing. Many communities were overwhelmed, and the worst single incident appears to have occurred in Panabaj, an impoverished Maya village in the highlands near Lake Atitlán in Sololá department. This volcanic lake was so overwhelmed by the torrential rains that many of the small, Mayan villages covering the shores experienced landslides from above. Some of the towns were so overwhelmed by the slides that the mayor has declared them graveyards, and all people who are missing are counted as dead. Piedra Grande, a hamlet in the municipality of San Pedro Sacatepéquez, was also destroyed. Floods and mudslides obliterated the community of about 1,400 people, and it was feared that most or all of the population of the community lost their lives. The government stated that it did not know what was going on in the southwest of the country, and particularly in the San Marcos department because a vital bridge was destroyed at El Palmar, Quetzaltenango, cutting the region off from the rest of the country. There were reported petrol shortages, including in Quetzaltenango.

A large portion of the figure comes from one village alone, as a mudslide completely destroyed the village of Panabaj in Guatemala's Sololá department.

=== El Salvador ===
The October 1 eruption of the Santa Ana Volcano, located near the capital San Salvador, compounded the problems, which led to even more destructive floods and mudslides from Stan.

Damage from Stan and the volcano was estimated at $355.6 million (2005 USD), equivalent to 2.2% of the country's GDP from the previous year.

A state of emergency was declared. According to the director of El Salvador's National Emergency Centre, 300 communities were affected by the floods, with over 54,000 people forced to flee their homes. A state of emergency also was called for in Guatemala by President Óscar Berger where 36,559 people were reported in emergency shelters. Some looting was also reported, a scene reminiscent of Hurricane Katrina five weeks previous.

A spokesman for the Salvadoran Red Cross said that "the emergency is bigger than the rescue capacity, we have floods everywhere, bridges about to collapse, landslides and dozens of roads blocked by mudslides". The Pan-American Highway was cut off by mudslides leading into the capital, San Salvador, as well as several other roads. 72 deaths were confirmed in El Salvador.

=== Elsewhere ===
Eight of the deaths in Nicaragua were as a result of a boat carrying migrants from Ecuador and Peru that ran ashore.

Throughout Honduras, heavy rains produced by Hurricane Stan resulted in seven fatalities and roughly $100 million in losses.

== Aftermath ==
Because of the severe damage and extensive loss of life wrought by the storm, the name Stan was retired from the Atlantic hurricane naming lists in April 2006 by the World Meteorological Organization. The name will never again be used for another tropical cyclone in the Atlantic basin. It was replaced with Sean for the 2011 Atlantic hurricane season.

The widespread damage across Mexico resulted in a state of emergency across five states, including 41 municipalities in Chiapas. There, relief supplies utilized Port Chiapas to distribute more than 2,000 tons of relief supplies. Helicopters airlifted supplies to 16,434 people across Chiapas, and occurred with such frequency that in Tapachula, helicopters left every five minutes in the weeks following the storm. Thousands of workers cleared and repaired roads. Mexico's Secretariat of Social Development hired 1,804 cooks and set up 270 temporary kitchens to feed people in the aftermath of the storm. Also in the state, officials encouraged a "Host Family" program, in which friends, family, or neighbors would temporarily house people left homeless by Stan, and in exchange receive food and cleaning supplies; about 1,200 families ultimately participated in the program. Hundreds of medical teams provided about 220,000 consultations to affected people across Chiapas. This included a program that helped more than 6,000 people deal with the psychological stresses of the storm. Health workers also cleaned water wells and fumigated areas to prevent the spread of dengue fever. Following the damaging effects in the state of Hidalgo, officials sent medical teams to 1,556 houses to stop the spread of diseases. In January and February 2006, workers from Mexico's Centro Nacional de Prevención de Desastres, or CENAPRED, visited the five most affected states to assess and assess the effects from the storm.

== See also ==
- List of Category 1 Atlantic hurricanes
- List of retired Atlantic hurricane names
- Hurricane Mitch (1998) – Second-deadliest Atlantic hurricane on record.
- Hurricane Karl (2010) – Similar storm that affected the same areas as Stan.
- Hurricane Ingrid (2013) – Another storm that, combined with another, brought devastation across Mexico.
- Timeline of the 2005 Atlantic hurricane season
