= Jorge Uscanga =

Mexican politician

- Born: 30 January 1944 (age 82); Catemaco, Veracruz, Mexico
- Occupation: Politician
- Political party: PRI

Jorge Uscanga Escobar (born 30 January 1944) is a Mexican politician affiliated with the Institutional Revolutionary Party (PRI). In the 2003 mid-terms he was elected to the Chamber of Deputies to represent Veracruz's 19th district during the 59th session of Congress.
