= Fernando Santamaría Prieto =

Mexican politician

- Born: 12 December 1952 (age 73); Veracruz, Mexico
- Occupation: Politician
- Political party: PAN

Fernando Santamaría Prieto (born 12 December 1952) is a Mexican politician from the National Action Party (PAN). In the 2009 mid-terms he was elected to the Chamber of Deputies to represent Veracruz's 19th district during the 61st session of Congress. He had previously served in the Congress of Veracruz.
