= Nemesio Domínguez Domínguez =

Mexican politician

- Born: 14 September 1950 (age 75); Santiago Tuxtla, Veracruz, Mexico
- Education: Universidad Veracruzana
- Occupation: Politician
- Political party: PRI

Nemesio Domínguez Domínguez (born 14 September 1950) is a Mexican politician from the Institutional Revolutionary Party.

He has served two terms in the Chamber of Deputies representing Veracruz's 19th district: during the 58th Congress (2000–2003), and during the 60th Congress (2006–2009).
