= Marina Garay Cabada =

Mexican politician (born 1953)

- Born: 6 December 1953 (age 72); Veracruz, Mexico
- Education: Universidad Veracruzana
- Occupation: Deputy
- Political party: PRI

Marina Garay Cabada (born 6 December 1953) is a Mexican politician affiliated with the Institutional Revolutionary Party (PRI). In the 2012 general election she was elected to the Chamber of Deputies to represent Veracruz's 19th district during the 62nd session of Congress. She previously served as a local deputy in the Congress of Veracruz from 2004 to 2007 and as the municipal president of San Andrés Tuxtla from 2008 to 2010.
