= Ángel Rosario Cabada =

Ángel Rosario Cabada (1872–1921) was an agrarian leader whose name was given to a town and municipality in the Mexican state of Veracruz.
