= Panabaj =

Village in Sololá, Guatemala

Coordinates: 14.752°N 91.173°W

Panabaj is a small village on the edge of Lake Atitlán in the western highlands of Guatemala. Prior to the disaster of Hurricane Stan in which over 400 persons from Panabaj and nearby Tzanchaj were killed or left missing, the town's population had numbered over 3,000, though a census has not been taken since.

== Geography ==
The village is in the municipality of Santiago Atitlán, bordering the city of Santiago Atitlán proper, in the department of Sololá. Most of the residents are Tz'utujil Maya people, one of the 21 Maya ethnic groups who live in Guatemala, often noted for their steadfastness in maintaining their clothing styles (especially the women's clothing) and traditional cultural and religious practices. Evangelical Protestantism and Roman Catholicism are also practiced among a large percentage of them.

== History ==
=== Political conflicts ===
Like many indigenous populations around the lake, many residents of Panabaj suffered during the 36-year-long on-again off-again Guatemalan Civil War that ended in 1996. Often spurred and taught by revolutionary political groups from abroad, many considered it to be merely a continuation of the age-old conflict between the Spaniards and the indigenous peoples of the New World. In 1990, 13 unarmed civilians were gunned down while protesting and throwing rocks into an army base located in Panabaj. International media attention forced the Guatemalan government to close the base and declare Santiago Atitlán and its environs, which include Panabaj and the bordering town of Tzanchaj, a "military-free zone."

=== 2005 landslide ===
During the early-morning hours of October 5, 2005, the town was flooded in a landslide triggered by torrential rains associated with Hurricane Stan. Mud poured off the saturated slopes of the volcano that loomed over the village, burying people and buildings. According to one report, the flow was "four kilometers long and up to 12 meters deep in places" while another said it was a "half-mile wide mudflow as much as 15 to 20 feet thick". Streets were inundated with mud, keeping rescue workers from reaching the area for two days. Rescue work was discontinued later in the week. From Panabaj and Tzanchaj, rescuers recovered 160 bodies, while 250 remained missing from both towns. Overall, more than a thousand people were killed.

Relief provision was hampered by a large number of major disasters in 2005, in particular by diversion of resources to deal with a severe earthquake in Pakistan that occurred just a few days after the mudslide .

=== Reconstruction ===
After the disaster, the mayor of Santiago Atitlán requested that Panabaj be declared a cemetery, not to be reinhabited; however, most of the townspeople returned, and the majority of the houses and stores were rebuilt for occupation by their original residents. Many of the residents subsequently relocated to settlements east of Santiago along the shore, named Chuk Muk I, II, and III.

Crops were replanted in the region on the shoreward side of the main road, which now, due to the earth deposits from the mudslide, extends farther out into the southern watershed of Lake Atitlán on the east side of the inlet, and the town is once again thriving much as it did before the catastrophe.

In addition to the crops planted on the massive now-solidified mud deposit, the highly fertile volcanic soil—as is the soil in most parts of Guatemala—has since sprouted grass, weeds and verdure, leaving little visual evidence that a mudslide took place, other than the occasional deep gulleys that were gouged out by rain water within weeks of the deluge when the mud was still soft, leaving the appearance now of thousands of years of erosion. The trees that were already there are still standing, though the ground level at their bases is now higher.

Many of the townspeople, with their skilled weaving and art, are benefiting financially from tourism, mainly from the U.S., Canada and European countries. Some of this work is included in the UNESCO-sponsored book, ‘'Arte Naif: Contemporary Guatemalan Mayan Painting, 1998.'‘ Many others continue to subsist with farming according to the traditional methods and net-fishing in their traditional homemade wooden boats.
