= San Andrés Tuxtla =

- City and municipality
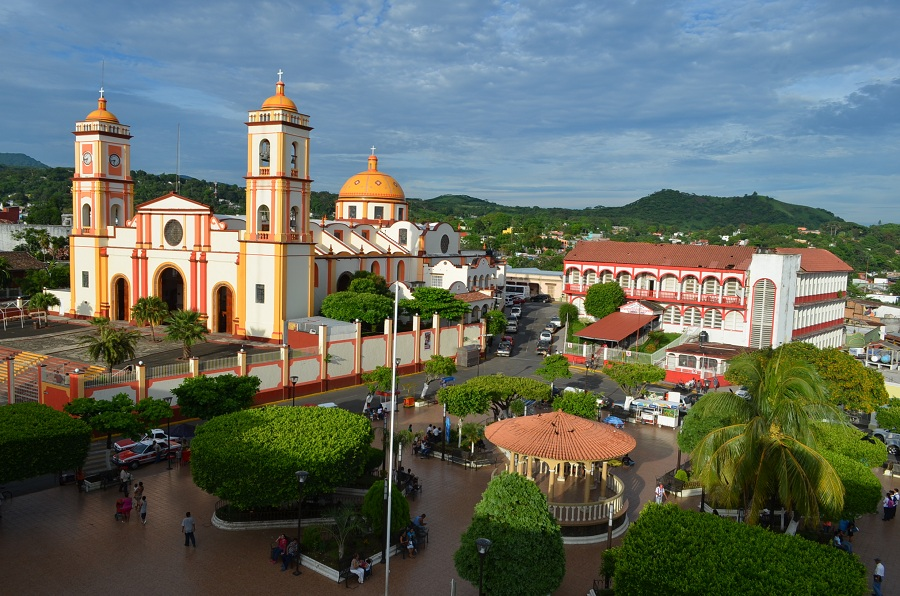
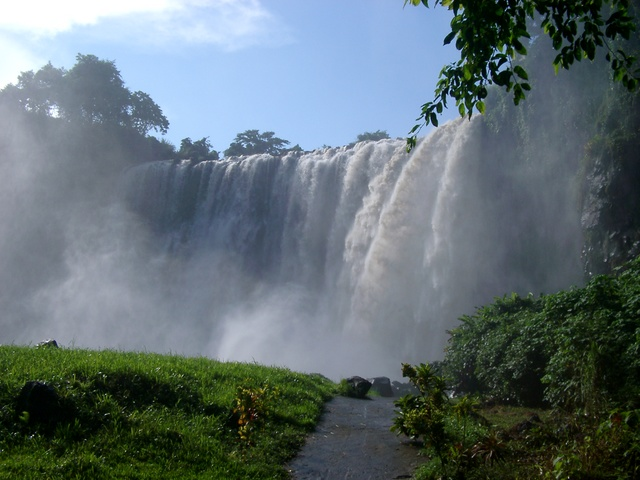
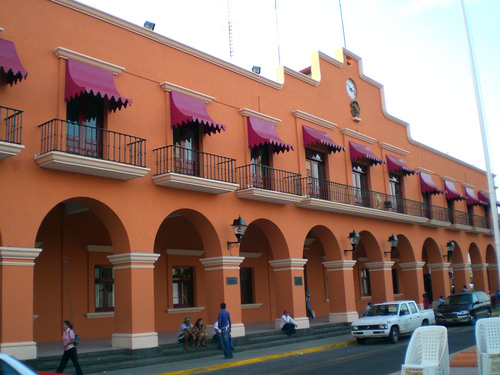
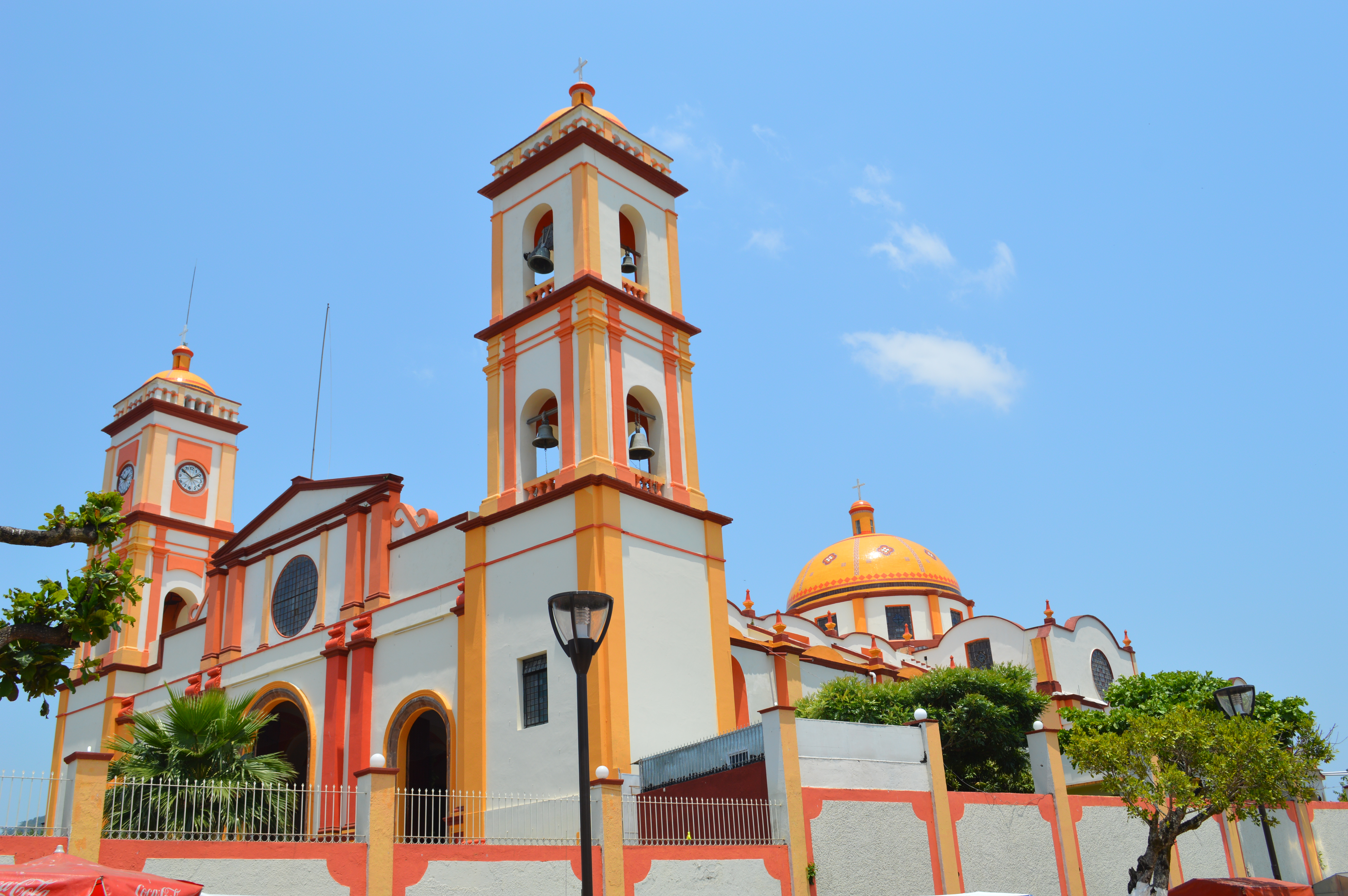
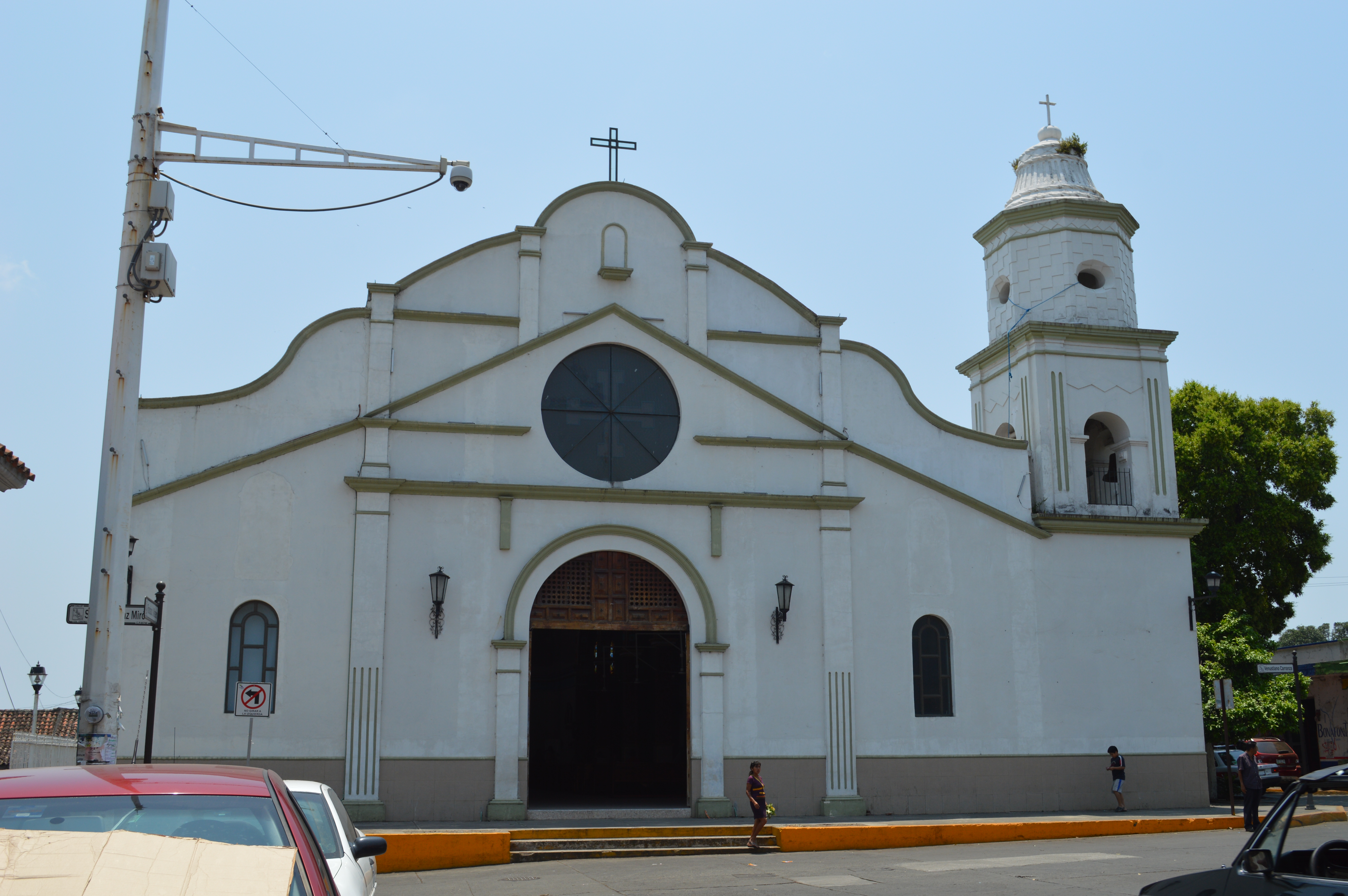
- Top: Panoramic view of the main plaza; Middle: Eyipantla Falls, San Andrés Tuxtla Municipal Hall; Bottom: San Andrés y San José Cathedral, Santa Rosa de Lima Church

- Coat of arms
- Interactive map of San Andrés Tuxtla
- Coordinates: 18°26′54″N 95°12′44″W
- Country: Mexico
- State: Veracruz
- Region: Los Tuxtlas

Government
  - Mayor: Rafael Gustavo Fararoni Magaña (MORENA)
  - Federal electoral district: Veracruz's 19th
- Elevation: 360 m (1,180 ft)

Population (2020)
  - Total: 162,428
  - Seat: 64,445
- Time zone: UTC-6 (Zona Centro)
- Website: sanandrestuxtla.gob.mx

San Andrés Tuxtla is a city and municipality in the south of the Mexican state of Veracruz. The city is the largest in the Los Tuxtlas region. It was founded after an eruption of the San Martín Volcano pushed people into this valley during the early colonial period. Since the 19th century, the area has been the center of Mexico's production of fine tobacco, mostly used in the making of cigars.

== The city ==
The city of San Andrés Tuxtla is the largest city in the municipality of the same name and in the entire Los Tuxtlas region. It is located in a small valley with the San Martín Volcano towering above it.

The city is centered on a square called Parque Lerdo, which has a circular kiosk in the center. Every Sunday the city sponsors cultural events such as art exhibitions and traditional music and dance, such and fandango and zapateado dance. Much of this reflects Afro-Mexican influence.

The main structure is the Cathedral of Saint Joseph and Saint Andrew, built in 1870 with sleek bell towers and a sober facade with Neoclassical influence. The patron saint of the city is Saint Andrew, who is celebrated on November 29 and 30. On the 29th, the main event is the running a bull figure made of reeds with the local youth. This is followed by a parade of mojigangas, large figures of hollow cartonería (papier-mâché)on a frame, worn on the shoulders of a dancer. The prototypes of these figures were brought to the area by the Spanish, and over time have been modified to a unique Tuxtla style. On November 30, there is mass and a procession with a large image of the saint pulled by tractor and surrounded by mojigangas. There are also releases of sky lanterns. Another important annual event is Las Ramas on December 16, which begin Las Posadas, a type of caroling event carrying branches.

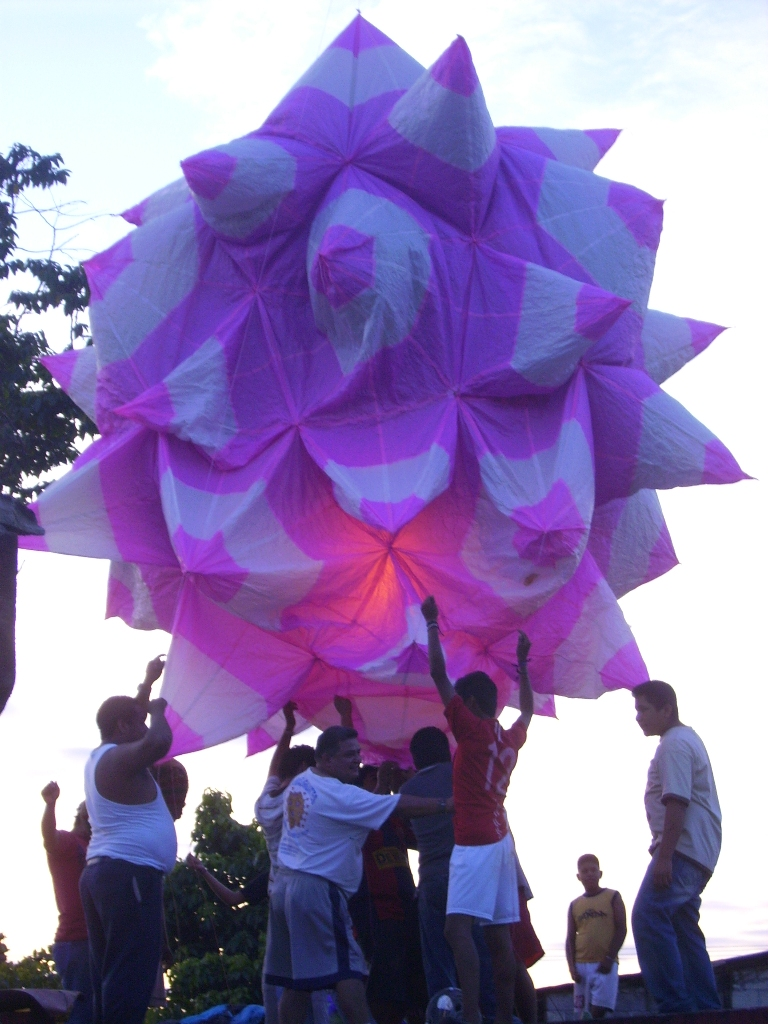
Sky lantern in the city

The main museum is the Regional Museum of San Andrés Tuxtla, which contains objects from the region, many of which were donated by residents. It was opened in 2008, and features artifacts from its pre-Hispanic history as far back as the Olmecs, and the development of the tobacco industry, especially in the 19th century. One important piece is a crucified Christ image called El Señor de Matacapan, whose pieces were found in Matacapan and reconstructed by the Instituto Nacional de Antropología e Historia.

The Casa de Cultura is on Hernandez y Hernandez Street and holds cultural events mostly attended by city residents. It also has a collection of pre-Hispanic artifacts.

The city has a number of old houses with gardens and patios from the city's heyday, and Parque Chichipilco is popular with families and holds cultural events.

La Maquina Vieja is an old industrial structure dating from 1840, located just outside the city.

== The municipality ==
Historical population
Year	Pop.	±%
1995	137,435	—
2000	142,343	+3.6%
2005	148,447	+4.3%
2010	157,364	+6.0%
2015	164,834	+4.7%
2020	162,428	−1.5%

The city of San Andrés Tuxtla is the local government for 261 communities, with a population of 64,445 inhabitants as 2020, which together extend over an area of 957.2 km^{2} (369.6 sq mi). It borders the municipalities of Santiago Tuxtla, Ángel R. Cabada, Catemaco, Hueyapan de Ocampo and Isla, extending to the Gulf of Mexico to the north and east. Five of the communities are considered urban and the rest are rural. Outside the seat, the largest communities are Comoapan (pop. 5,426), Calería (4,066), Salto de Eyipantla (4,008) and Sihuapan (3,930). Overall, the population density if 164.4 people per square km, and an estimated indigenous population of 1,505 with 540 of these speaking an indigenous language. The municipal government consists of a municipal president, a syndic and eleven representatives for the communities. There are 413 schools, most of which serves preschool and primary school students. There are high schools, vocational schools two university level schools and adult education. The Instituto Tecnológico Superior de San Andrés Tuxtla was founded in 1983 with three majors. Today it offers eight, mostly in engineering and computers. Theilliteracy rate is 15.7 percent.

Most of the cigar making establishments are in the Matacapan area, between the cities of San Andres Tuxtla and Catemaco off Highway 180. The area is dotted with large house-like structure in which tobacco is cured.

The coastline has a number of beaches which are promoted under the name of Costa de Oro, along with Puerto de Balzapote, a fishing village.

== Socioeconomics ==
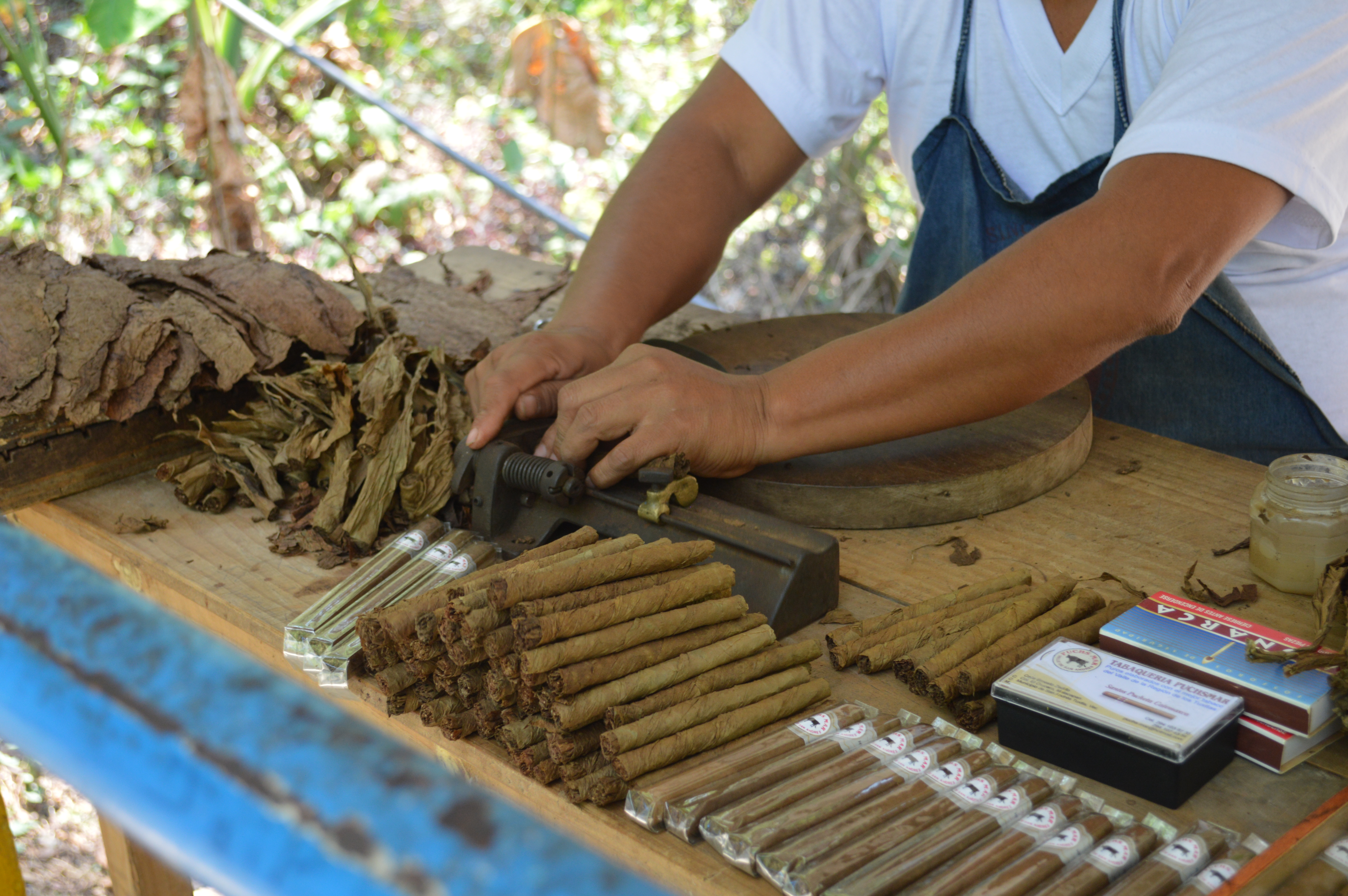
Vendor rolling cigars in San Andrés Tuxtla

The municipality is classified as having a medium level of socioeconomic marginalization, with 75.2% living in poverty and 24.7 living in extreme poverty. Agriculture employs 25.9% of the working population, with 21.8 working in industry and 51.4% in commerce and services.

Main crops by volume are corn, mango and sugar cane. Most livestock is cattle, followed by domestic fowl, pigs and goats. Traditional dishes are based on local agriculture and include frijoles con chonegui, Puerco al acuyo, tamales, momocho, chochogo, chagalapoli, ilama and malanga.

San Andrés Tuxtla is best known for the production of tobacco and cigars and cigarettes with their cigars considered the best in Mexico, and Winston Churchill is said to have favored cigars from the area. The area's tobacco history began in the 19th century when Cuban and German immigrants and decided that they could grow fine tobacco and make cigars here for export to Europe. Today, the area produces some of the finest cigars in the world. All steps from the growing of tobacco, to curing to wrapping are all done in the municipality with San Andres's own experts to assure quality. Torcedores, or those who create the cigars from cured tobacco leaves, apprentice for two years. Many families have worked in the industry for generations, with children learning the work as children in family workshops which make both cigars and cigarettes.

The best known local producer of cigars is Te Amo in Sihuapan, ranked as among the best cigar producers in the world. The enterprise employs and average of 350 people although times of peak demand can raise this number to 1,200. Te Amo and other producers have large "houses" in which tobacco leaves are dried and fermented using firewood and steam over a course of fifteen days. The dried and fermented leaves are rehydrated for deveining and rolling. After this, the cigars are stored for one or two years before going to market. The flavor of the cigar depends on the selected leaves. Te Amo produces five kinds of cigars which vary in diameter and length.

Other notable tobacco producers include Matacapan, Sihuapan, La Constancia and El Salto.

There are 161 km of main highway, mostly state-maintained roads. The main highway through the area is Federal Highway 180.

== Geography ==
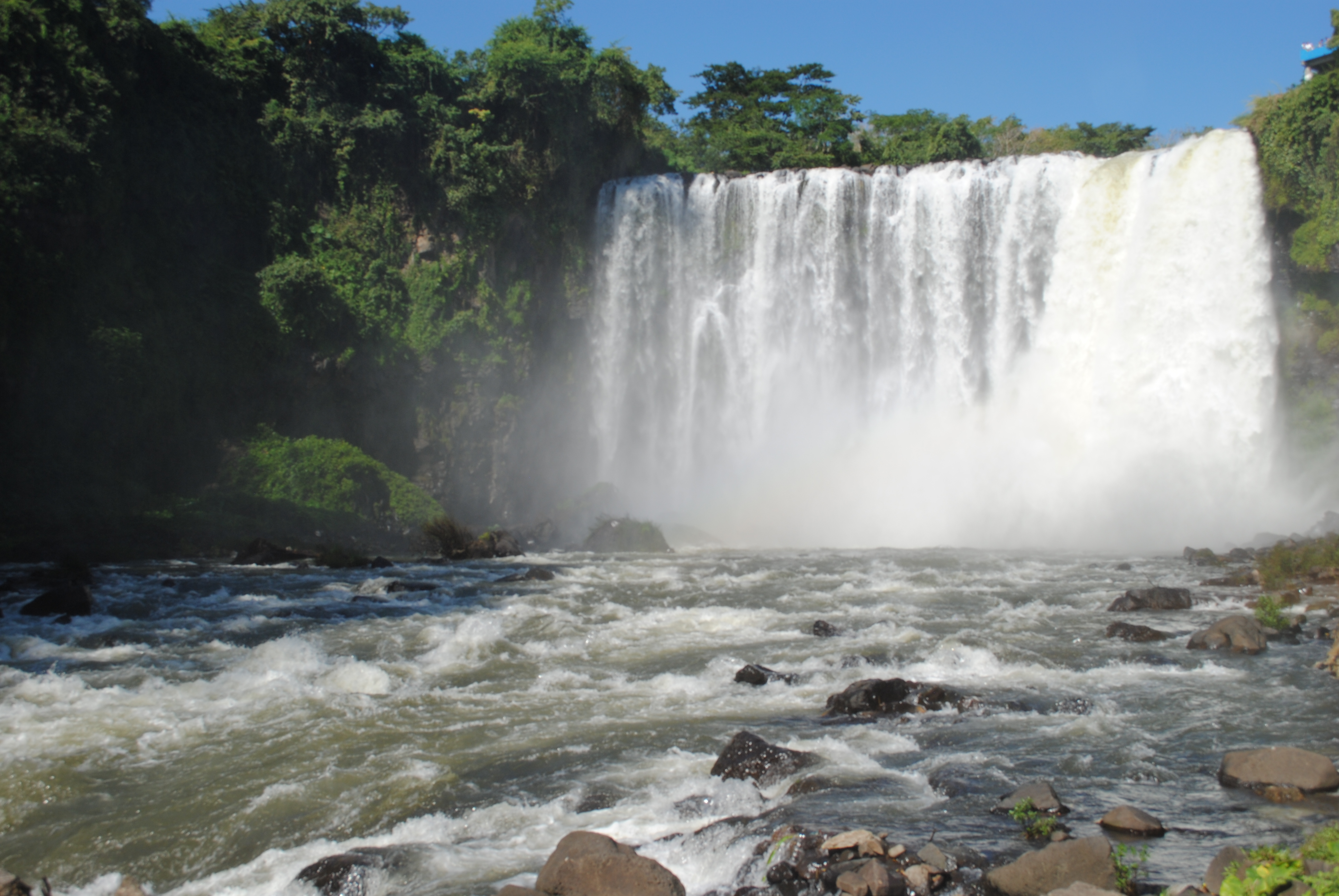
View of the Eyipantla Falls

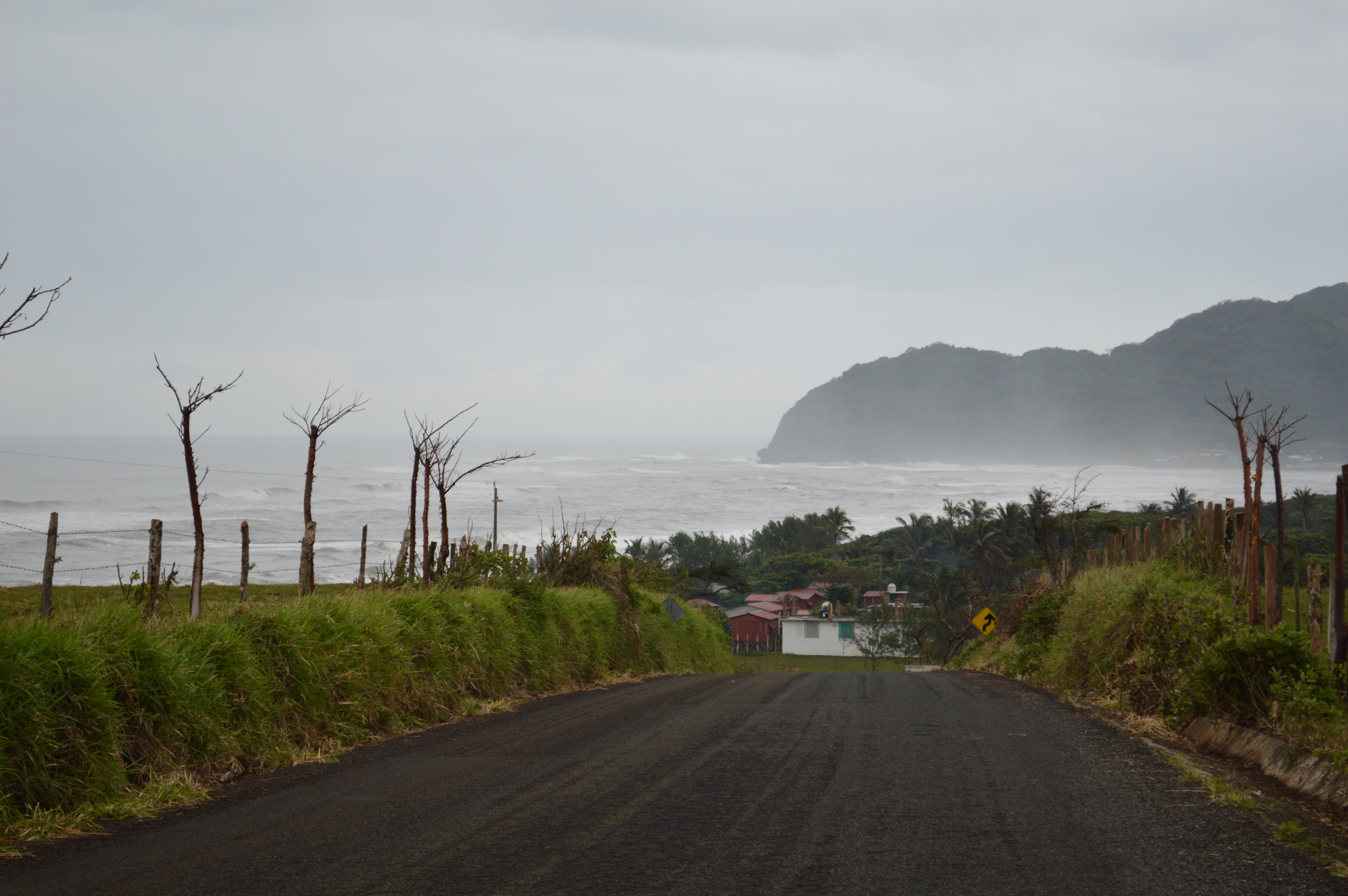
Playa de Revolución

The municipality is located in the south of Veracruz in the San Martin Mountain Range in the Los Tuxtlas region. It has rugged terrain of volcanic origin that extends to the Gulf of Mexico and an average altitude of 300 meters above sea level. The main elevations are San Martín, Mastagaga, Vigía and El Chilar. There are caverns at Roca Partida, De la Encantas, the Cerro del Borrego and Arrecife de la Poza.

Along the Gulf shore there are beaches such as Salinas Roca Partida, Toro Prieto, Arroyo de Lisa, Costa de Oro, Playa Hermosa, Los Organos, Dos de Abril, Monte Pio and Balzapote (which is also a fishing port). There are cliffs at Roca Partida.

=== Hydrography ===
Most of the municipality's surface water is in the San Andrés River, streams such as the Sihuapan and San Juan and various small lakes. Laguna Encantada (Enchanted Lake) is an isolated lake, off the highway between the city and Sontecomapan in the neighboring Catemaco municipality. The road does not reach the lake, so it is necessary to walk about a kilometer over a rise. The name comes from the fact that its water level rises in the dry season and lowers during the rainy season. Its circumference is 1,500 meters. Other lakes include De Cuyapan, De Tizatal, Los Manantiales, Delicia and Carrizal.

On the San Andrés River is the Eyipantla Falls, located twelve km from the municipal seat. The name comes from Nahuatl and means "three furrows of water." Legend has it that Tlaloc, Aztec god of rain, governed the Los Tuxtlas area and the waterfall was his home. The falls are part of the San Andres River, which drains Lake Catemaco on its way to the Gulf of Mexico. The falls itself is forty meters wide and fifty meters high. It is popular with tourists, to descent 400 stairs to the foot of the falls. At the top of the falls, there is a lookout point which gives view of the surrounding mountains along with the falls. The entrance to the falls is crowded with restaurants and tourist shops. Another important waterfall in the municipality is Los Organos, located between Playa Hermosa and Costa de Oro. Other waterfalls include Del Río Revolución, Salto Maquina Vieja and Tres Chorros.

=== Flora and fauna ===
Most of the natural vegetation of the area has been destroyed with 410.1 km^{2} (158.3 sq mi) used for agriculture, 398.3 km^{2} (153.8 sq mi) for pasture and 7.7 km^{2} (3.0 sq mi) is urban. About 36 km2 contains secondary vegetation, 10.8 km^{2} (4.2 sq mi) is forest and 94.1km2 is rainforest. The soil is poor in nutrients and is susceptible to erosion. Despite this, much of the municipality is part of the second most important biosphere reserve in Mexico, the San Andres Tuxtla Reserve. The remaining dominant natural foliage is mostly high perennial rainforest, with dunes and secondary vegetation near the coast.

Wildlife consists of armadillos, rabbits, opossums, skunks and anteaters.

=== Climate ===
The climate of the municipality varies depending on location. It is warm in all parts but the amount of rain varies to areas with most rain in the summer to those that receive abundant rainfall year-round. Average annual temperature varies from 18 to 28C and average annual rainfall varies from 1,100 to 4,600mm.

== History ==
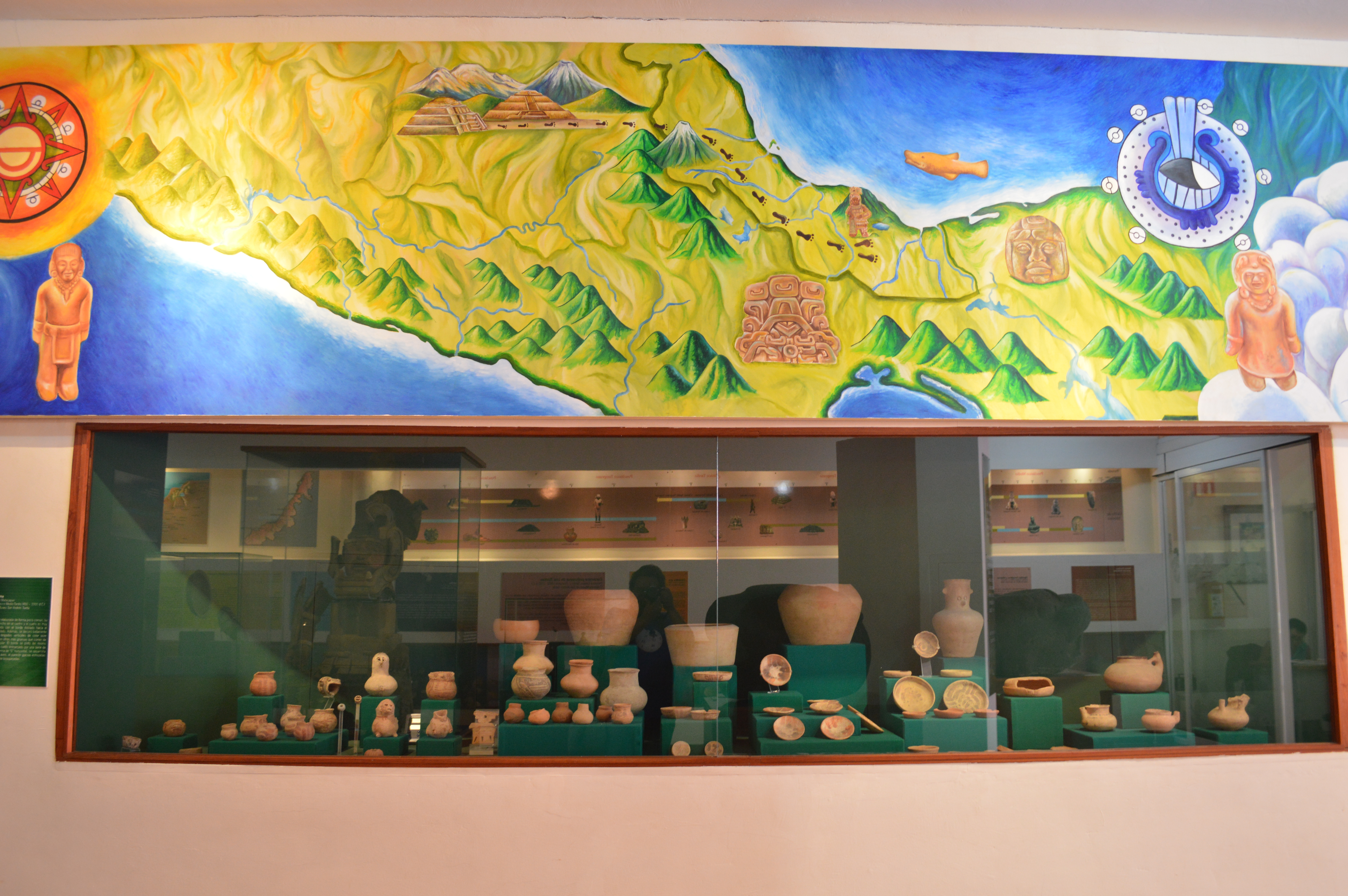
Display of area pre-Hispanic ceramics at the regional museum

The name "Tuxtla" is derived from Nahuatl and means "place of the rabbit". San Andrés refers to the patron saint, Saint Andrew.

In the 16th century, the area belonged to the Santiago Tuxtla province. In 1530 there was an eruption of the San Martín Volcano, which prompted the movement of people from Ixtlán to what is now the city of San Andrés Tuxtla, then called Tuzacoalco (land between the mountains). The settlement was recognized in 1580 by the head of the Tlacotalpan, Tuztla and Cotaxtla region.

Its tobacco history began in 1830 when a slow influx of Cubans and Europeans made their way here and decided that the climate was apt for the growing of fine tobacco. Today, the area produces some of the finest cigars in the world. Just prior to the Mexican Revolution the industry experienced strikes by workers, with the first occurring at the El Destino factory in 1896.

The municipality was defined in 1825 and in 1826 the city was declared its seat. In 1830 the seat was declared a town, and in 1893 a city.

In 1932, the city and municipality's name was changed to Los Tuxtlas, but this was changed back to San Andrés Tuxtla in 1938.

== Sister city ==
San Andrés Tuxtla has one sister city:

- (United States) - Pharr, Texas, USA

== See also ==
- Montepío, a coastal village in the municipality
