= Ángel R. Cabada =

- Town
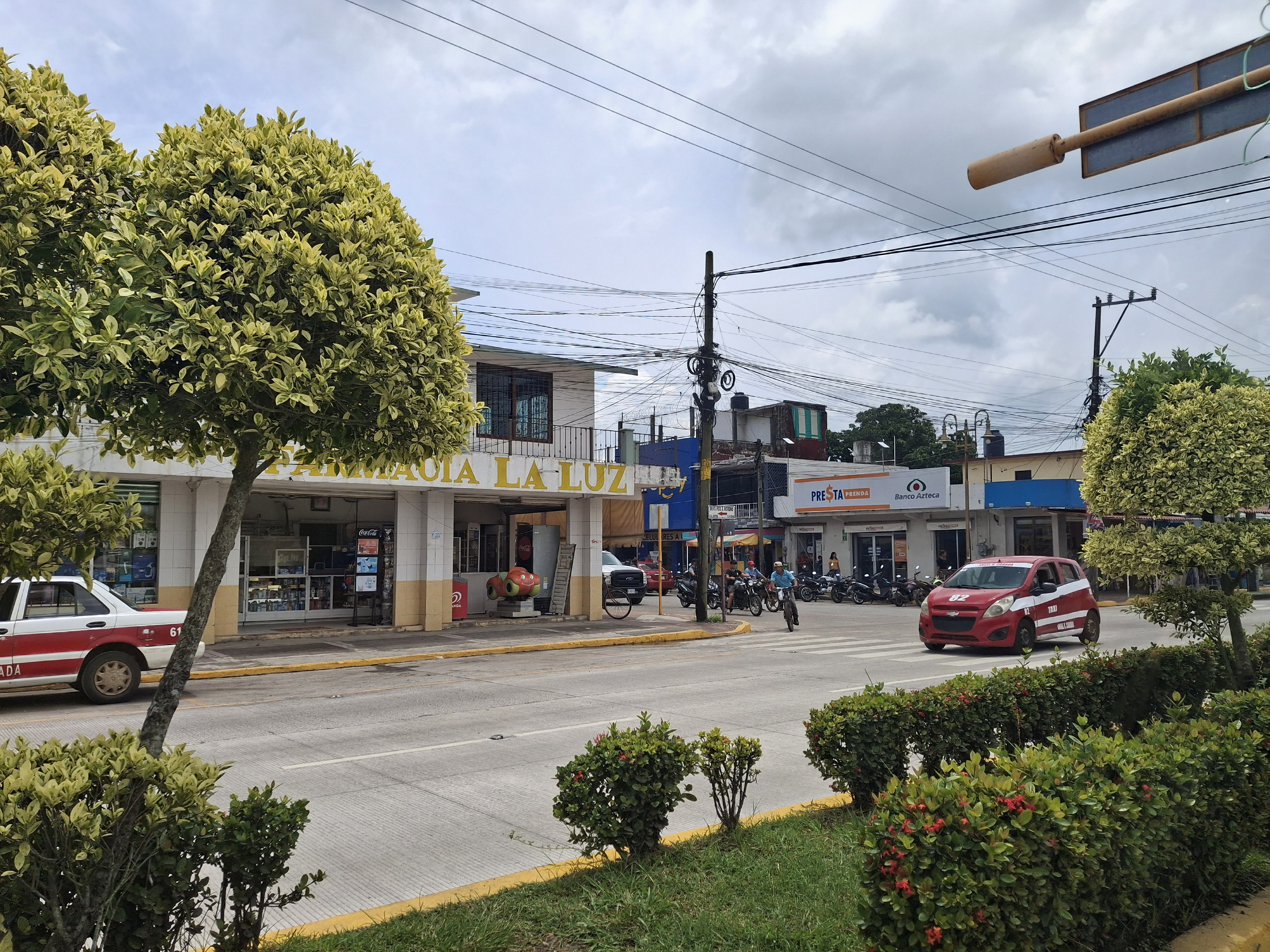
- Street of Ángel R. Cabada

- Location within Veracruz Location within Mexico
- Coordinates: 18°35′49″N 95°26′43″W
- Country: Mexico
- State: Veracruz
- Region: Papaloapan
- Municipality: Ángel R. Cabada
- Decreed as villa: 14 December 1966
- Named for: Ángel Rosario Cabada

Population (2005)
  - Total: 11,689
- Time zone: UTC-6 (Central)
- Climate: Am

Ángel R. Cabada is a town (villa) in the Mexican state of Veracruz. Located in the state's Papaloapan River region, it serves as the municipal seat for the surrounding municipality of the same name.

In the 2005 INEGI Census, the town reported a total population of 11,689.

The town is named after Ángel Rosario Cabada (1872-1921), an agrarian leader. Previously, the town was named El Mesón. El Mesón had been a small regional center of the Olmec or Epi-Olmec culture during a period between 400 BCE and 100 CE. Local farmers found the El Mesón Stela in the 1950s. (Tres Zapotes, about 15 km south of El Mesón, was part of the Olmec heartland.)

== Climate ==
Climate data for Ángel R. Cabada (1991–2020 normals, extremes 1956–present)
Month	Jan	Feb	Mar	Apr	May	Jun	Jul	Aug	Sep	Oct	Nov	Dec	Year
Record high °C (°F)	36.5 (97.7)	39 (102)	41.5 (106.7)	42.5 (108.5)	44 (111)	42.5 (108.5)	38.5 (101.3)	37.5 (99.5)	38.5 (101.3)	39 (102)	38 (100)	36.5 (97.7)	44 (111)
Mean daily maximum °C (°F)	26.6 (79.9)	28.1 (82.6)	30.7 (87.3)	33.3 (91.9)	34.6 (94.3)	33.8 (92.8)	32.9 (91.2)	32.8 (91.0)	31.8 (89.2)	30.5 (86.9)	28.7 (83.7)	27.3 (81.1)	30.9 (87.6)
Daily mean °C (°F)	21.7 (71.1)	22.8 (73.0)	24.8 (76.6)	27.3 (81.1)	28.7 (83.7)	28.5 (83.3)	27.8 (82.0)	27.8 (82.0)	27.2 (81.0)	25.9 (78.6)	23.9 (75.0)	22.4 (72.3)	25.7 (78.3)
Mean daily minimum °C (°F)	16.8 (62.2)	17.4 (63.3)	18.9 (66.0)	21.2 (70.2)	22.8 (73.0)	23.2 (73.8)	22.6 (72.7)	22.7 (72.9)	22.6 (72.7)	21.3 (70.3)	19.2 (66.6)	17.5 (63.5)	20.5 (68.9)
Record low °C (°F)	9.5 (49.1)	9 (48)	10.5 (50.9)	12 (54)	15.5 (59.9)	18.5 (65.3)	19 (66)	19 (66)	17.5 (63.5)	12.5 (54.5)	10.5 (50.9)	7 (45)	7 (45)
Average precipitation mm (inches)	101.8 (4.01)	56.2 (2.21)	29.2 (1.15)	33.9 (1.33)	54.5 (2.15)	155.9 (6.14)	259.6 (10.22)	291.3 (11.47)	547.1 (21.54)	494.9 (19.48)	285.6 (11.24)	123.2 (4.85)	2,433.2 (95.80)
Average precipitation days	16.5	11.1	9.4	7.3	7.8	15.2	18.0	19.4	20.7	18.7	17.2	16.5	177.8
Source: Servicio Meteorológico Nacional
