= Santiago Tuxtla =

- City and municipality
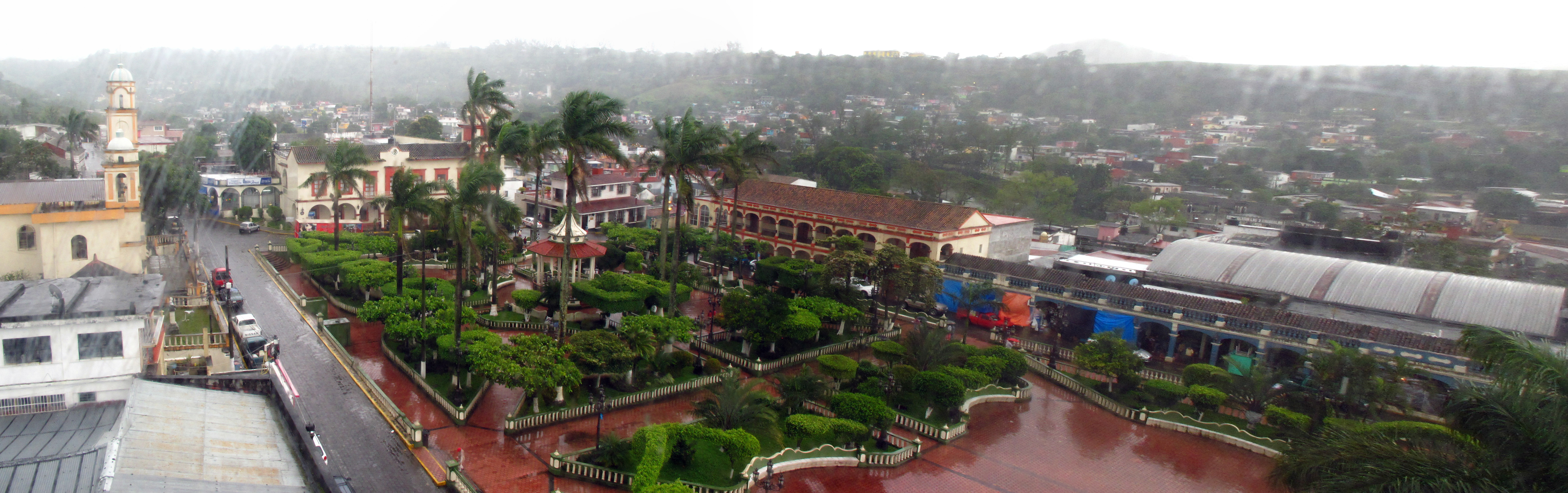
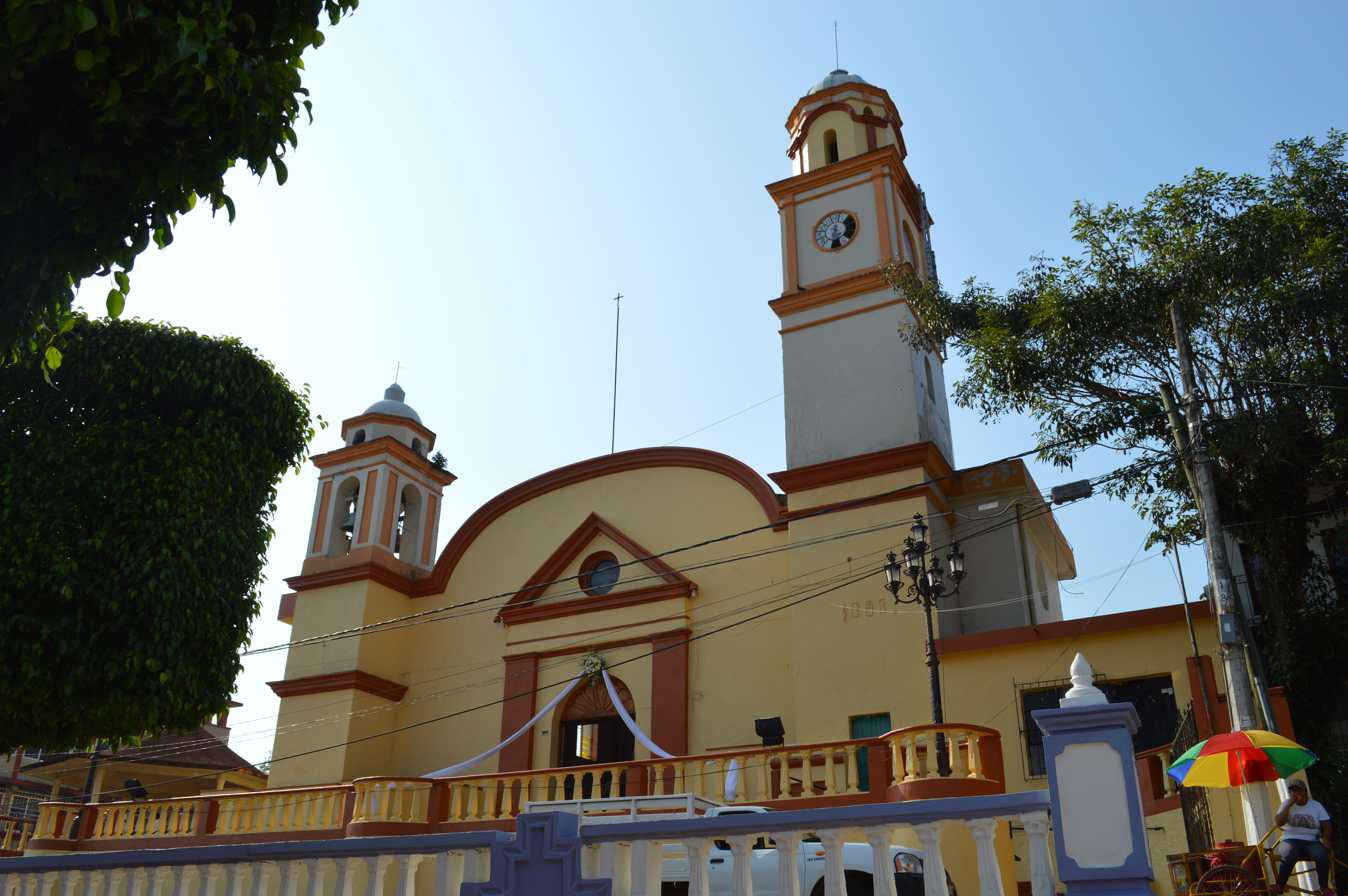
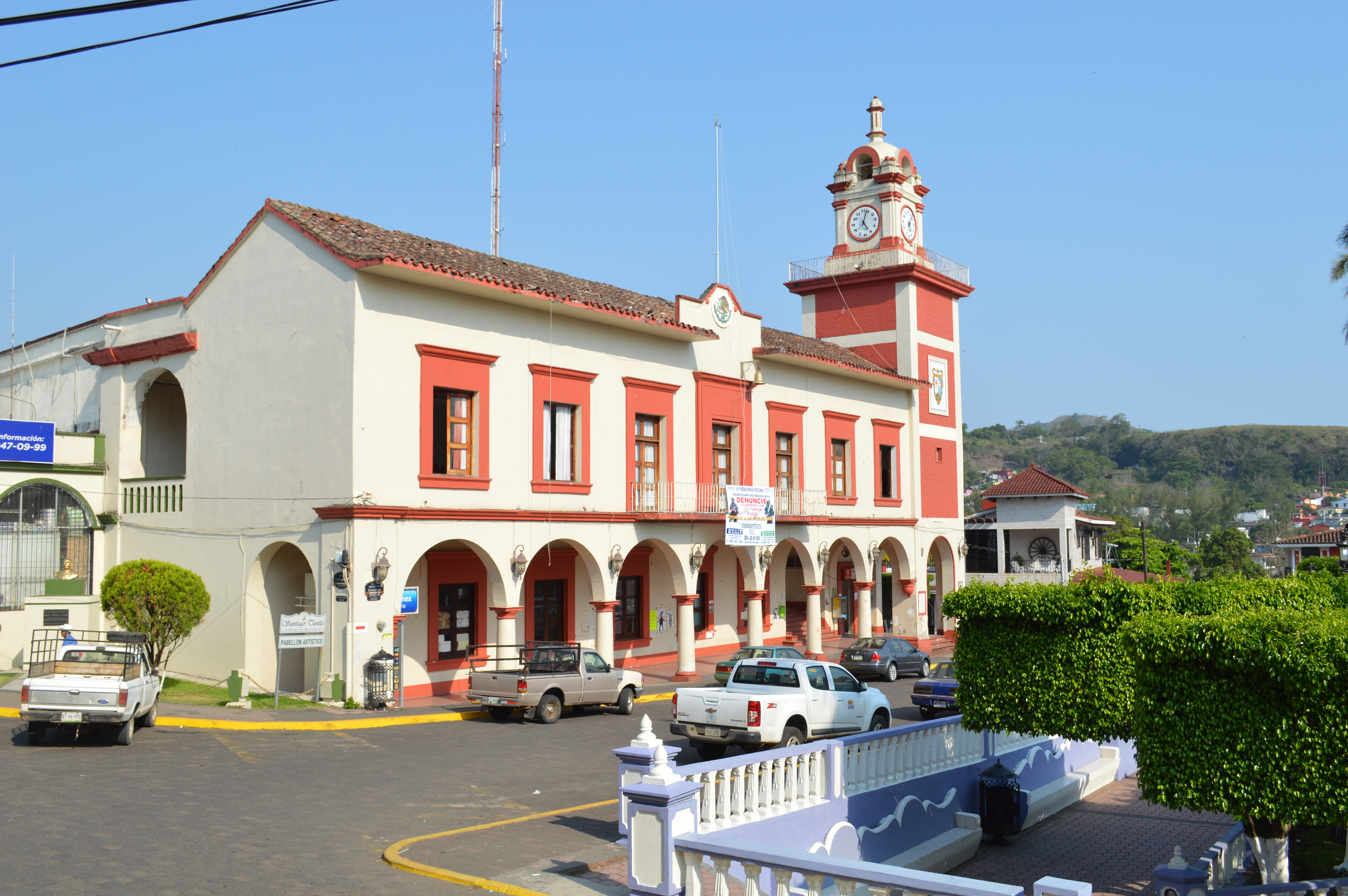
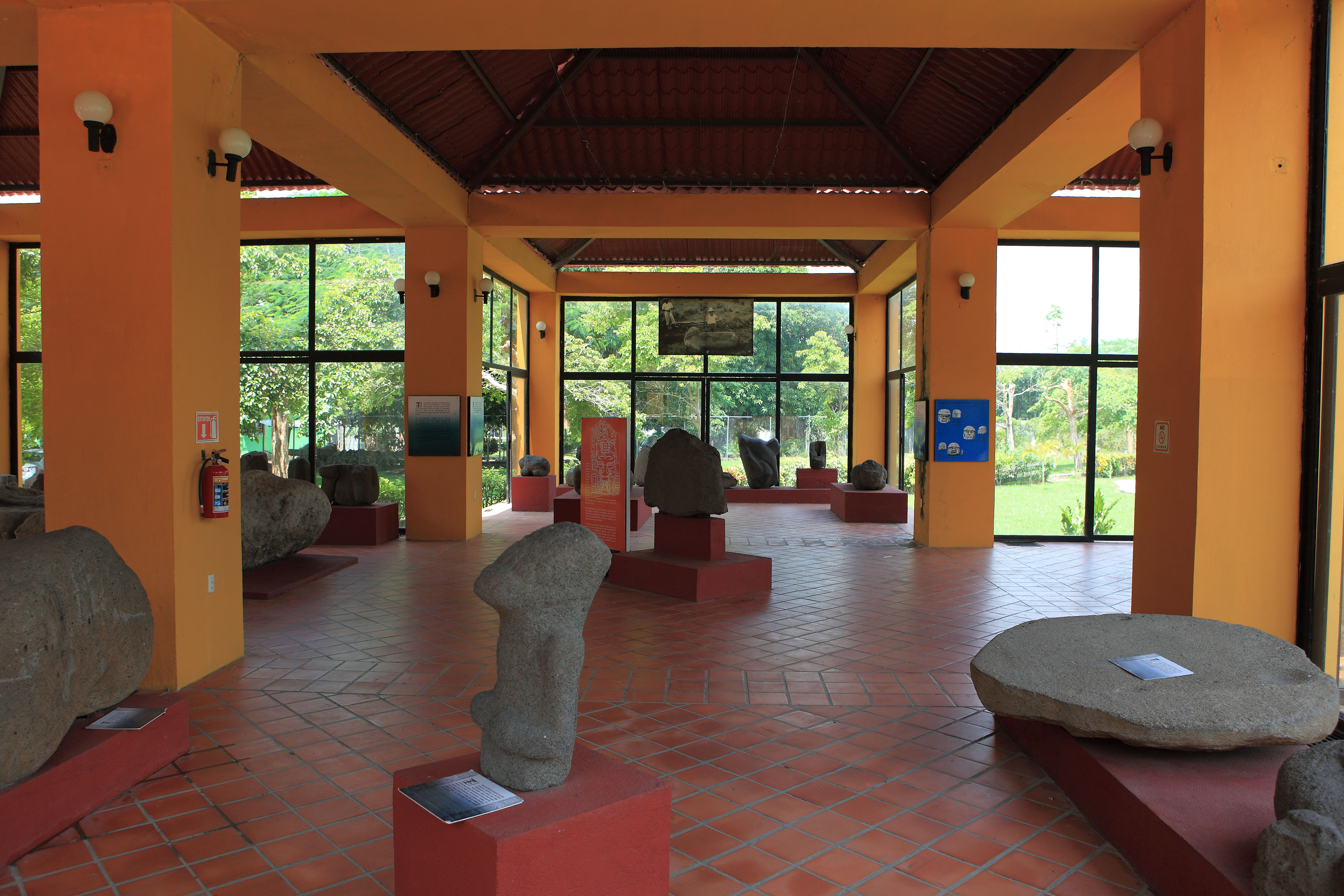
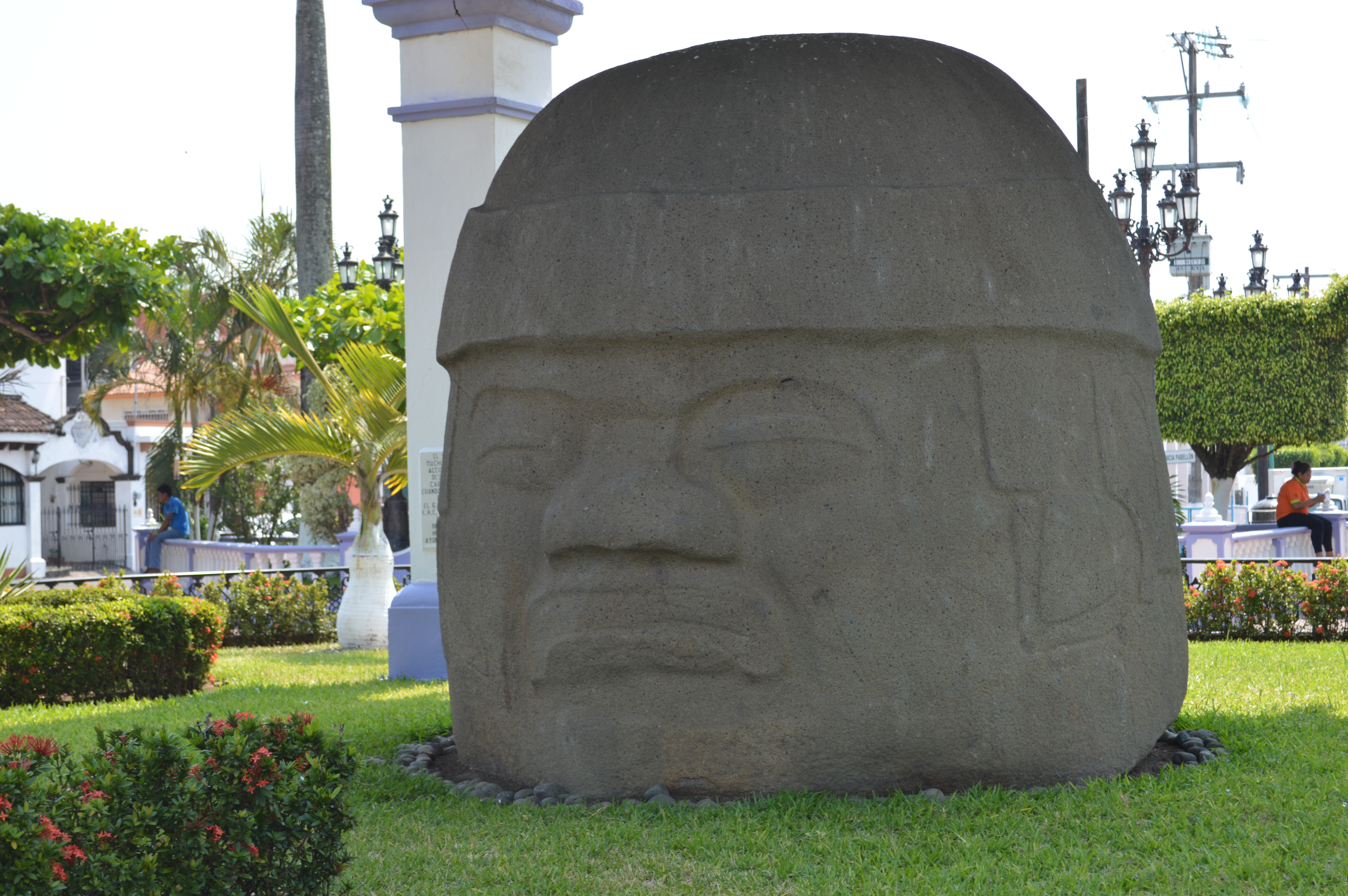
- Top: Panoramic view of the main plaza; Middle: Santiago Apóstol Church, Santiago Tuxtla Municipal Hall; Bottom: Tres Zapotes site museum, La Corbata colossal head

- Coat of arms
- Interactive map of Santiago Tuxtla
- Coordinates: 18°27′55″N 95°18′9″W
- Country: Mexico
- State: Veracruz
- Region: Los Tuxtlas

Government
  - Mayor: Kristel Hernández Topete (PRD)

Area
  - Total: 619.4 km^{2} (239.2 sq mi)
- Elevation: 300 m (980 ft)

Population (2020)
  - Total: 57,085
  - Seat: 15,733
- Time zone: UTC-6 (Central Standard Time)
- Postal code: 95830
- Website: Official website

Santiago Tuxtla is a small city and municipality in the Mexican state of Veracruz. The area was originally part of lands granted to Hernán Cortés by the Spanish Crown in 1531. The city was founded in 1525, but it did not gain municipal status until 1932. Today, the municipality is poor and agricultural but is home to several unique traditions such as the Santiago Tuxtla Fair and the Acarreo de Niño Dios, when images of the Child Jesus are carried in procession several times during the Christmas season. It is also home to the Museo Regional Tuxteco (Tuxtla Regional Museum) which houses much of the area's Olmec artifacts, including a number of colossal heads and other monumental stone works. The city's main plaza hosts the largest Olmec colossal head in Mexico, thus making it famous.

== The city ==
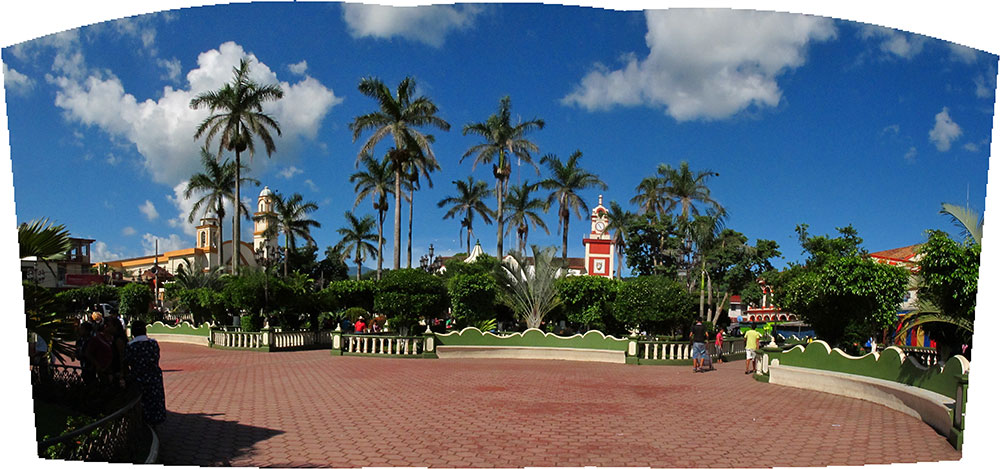
Panorama of the main plaza

The city of Santiago Tuxtla is centered on a large square called Parque Juarez, which contains the largest of the Olmec colossal heads in Mexico, La Corbata.

The other main focus of the city center is the Museo Regional Tuxteco (Tuxtla Regional Museum). This museum was founded in 1961 to display and preserve the area's pre Hispanic and colonial heritage, coming under the management of the Instituto Nacional de Antropología e Historia in 1975. The museum building was renovated in the 2010s. The museum building is the former "municipal palace" (city hall) which was constructed in 1880 with an arched portico. Inside there are three main halls. Two of these are dedicated mostly to Olmec pieces, including colossal stone sculptures as well as some Totonac pieces, all from Veracruz. One of the most important pieces is the Hueyapan Head, a 20-ton colossal head in volcanic stone. The third hall is dedicated to pieces related to the area's colonial history.

== The municipality ==
Historical population
Year	Pop.	±%
1995	54,522	—
2000	54,539	+0.0%
2005	54,939	+0.7%
2010	56,427	+2.7%
2015	57,466	+1.8%
2020	57,085	−0.7%

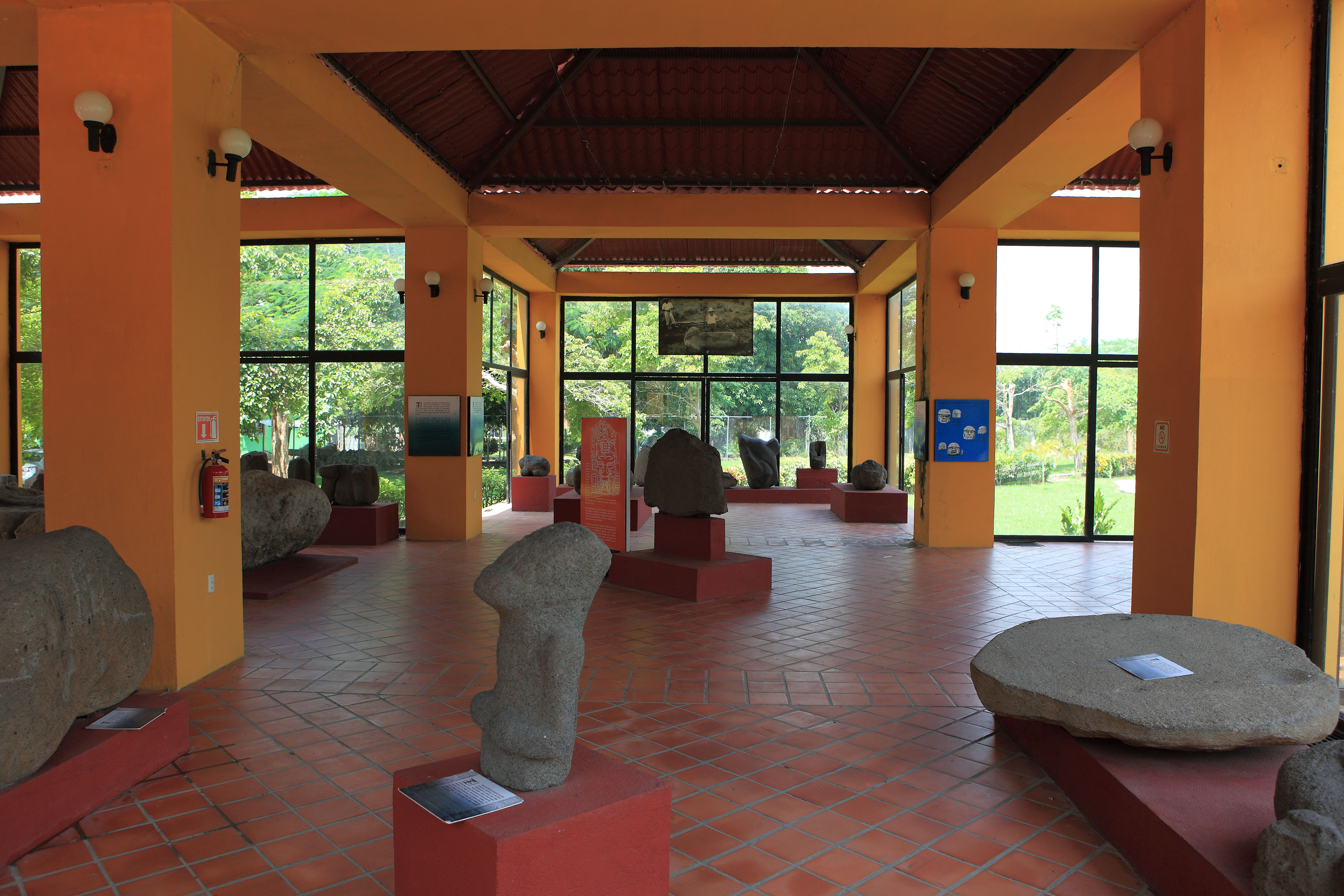
Inside the Tres Zapotes Site Museum

The city of Santiago Tuxtla, with a population of 15,733, is the local government for 242 communities, which combined have a territory of 619.4 km^{2} (239.2 sq mi) and a population of 57,085 inhabitants as 2020. It is mostly rural, with only three communities considered to be urban and a population density of 92.16 people per km^{2}. 348 people are classed as living in "indigenous homes" with only 147 speaking an indigenous language.

Outside the seat, other important communities include Tres Zapotes (pop. 3,670), Tlapacoyan (2,834), Tapalapan (2,521) and Francisco I. Madero (1,820). The municipality borders the municipalities of San Andrés Tuxtla, Isla, Tlacotalpan, Saltabarranca and Ángel R. Cabada as well as the Gulf of Mexico. The government consists of a president, a syndic and five representatives for the communities of the municipality.

The municipality has 218 schools, mostly preschools and primary schools, with 35 middle schools and 15 high schools. The level of illiteracy is 18.2%.

The municipality is home to three colossal Olmec head and the Tres Zapotes Museum/Archeological Site . This site was occupied from about 900 BCE to somewhere between 400 and 300 BCE, contemporary with La Venta in Tabasco. It is centered on a hill used to astronomical observations and mathematical calculations related to the Olmec calendar system. The site is named after the community of Tres Zapotes, 21 km from the city of Santiago Tuxtla. Originally the land was part of the Hueyapan de Mimendi Hacienda, dedicated to the growing of zapote fruit. The site was opened to the public in 1974, focusing on the site museum which contains a number of important artifacts.

The most notable areas on the municipality's coast, which is part of the Costa de Oro, is Punta Roca Partida (Parted Rock Point) and Terrón Island. Punta Roca Partida is noted for its rock formations. One of the most popular for visitors is the Lorencillo Cave, which is the size of a house and named after a Dutch pirate who used it as a hideout. Terrón Island is uninhabited but it used to house prisoners. There are also beaches such as Salinas and Toro Prieto.

The municipality has 98.2 km of major paved roads, most of which are maintained by the state.

== Geography ==
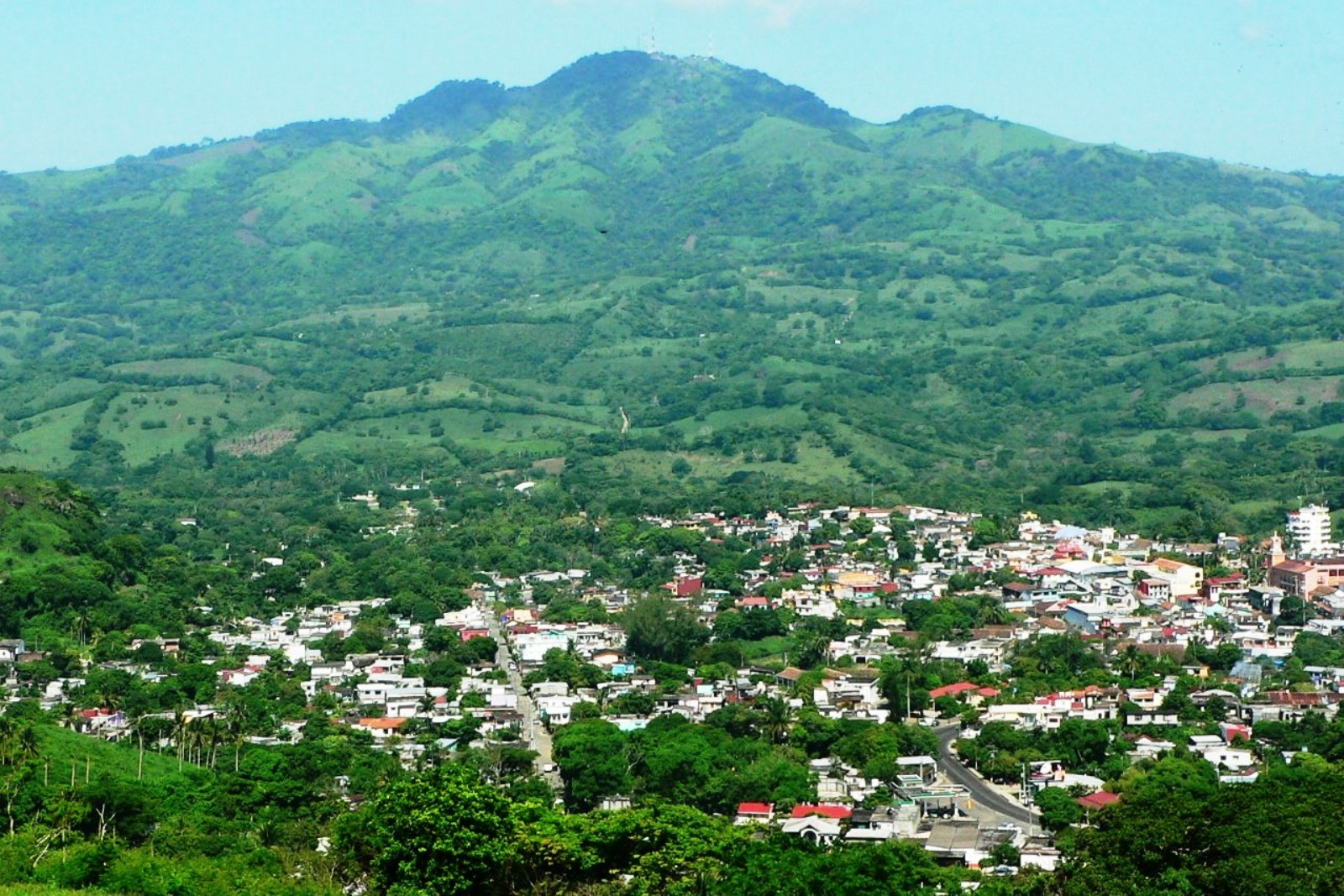
City and surrounded farm/pasture land

The municipality is located in the south of Veracruz, about 260 km from the state capital of Xalapa. It is part of the Sierra de los Tuxtlas Region, a somewhat mountainous area created by volcanic activity. Most of the territory lives on an extinct volcano named El Vigía along with the plains of the San Juan River, with an average altitude of 200 meters above sea level.

=== Hydrography ===
It is part of the Papaloapan River Basin, with the main river being the Pixixiapan or Tuxtla River.

=== Climate ===
Most of the municipality is hot and humid with most rain falling in the summer. About 30% is relatively drier. The average annual temperature is between 24 and 26C and the average annual precipitation varies from 1,400 to 3,600mm.

=== Flora and fauna ===
Most of the territory is converted into farmland (330.9 km^{2} (127.8 sq mi)) or pasture (277.5 km^{2} (107.1 sq mi)) with 1.7 km^{2} (0.66 sq mi) urbanized and 7.3 km^{2} (2.8 sq mi) is covered in secondary vegetation. Only 0.7 km^{2} (0.27 sq mi) still contains the native high perennial rainforest. Wildlife mostly consists of small animals such as squirrels, raccoons and opossums.

== Socioeconomics ==
The municipality is poor and agricultural, with 74.9% living in poverty and 22.9% living in extreme poverty. However, there are a number of medical and other social services, classifying the area as having only a medium level of socio-economic marginalization.

Most of the working population (52.8 %) is dedicated to agriculture, with 13.2 % in manufacturing and mining and 33.9 % in commerce and services. Main crop by volume is corn, followed by sugar cane and beans. Livestock is mostly cattle followed by pigs, sheep and domestic fowl. There are deposits of sand and clay.

== Culture ==
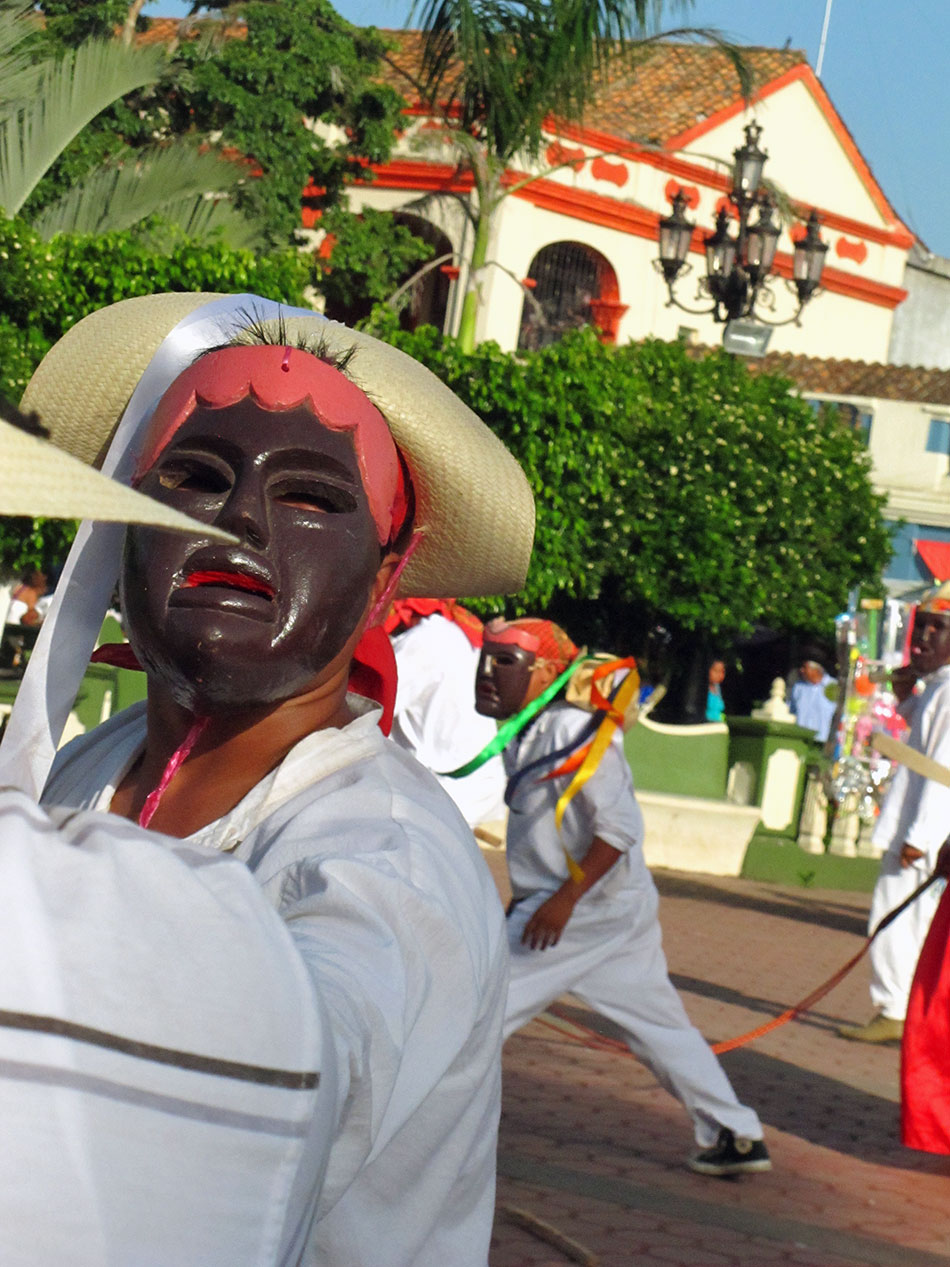
Dancer in "Negritos" mask

The municipality home to a number of unique traditions and celebrations. One aspect is that traditional music includes that of Huasteca influence such as sons and huapangos, played on jaranas and violins.

The patron saint, Saint James the Moor-slayer, is celebrated at the end of July with both religious and secular events. The concurrent Santiago Tuxtla Fair runs from 22 to 30 July, with the saint's day being the 25th. This is preceded for several Sundays beforehand with traditional dances such as "Negros" and "Cristianos." The fair includes more traditional dance, such as "Toros de Petate" and "Líceres," which have pre Hispanic origins, horse races, exhibitions, vendors' booths and concerts. It also includes the crowning of a festival queen on the 22nd, a major procession in honor of the saint with representatives of the city's nine neighborhoods, and the State Fandango Competition. The events attracts thousands of visitors as well as Veracruz state officials.

The Christmas season is characterized here with a unique tradition called the "Acarreo de Niño Dios" (Carrying of the Child Jesus). This is a series of processions, with participants carrying images of the infant Jesus. The first occurs on 24 December, which the figures are brought to Christmas Even midnight mass accompanied by people dressed as shepherds and traditional music. The figures on this occasion are brought nude to represent the recent birth. This is the most popular procession, drawing crowds of spectators. The images are carried again on December 31, this time dressed and brought to nativity scenes to be seated. The last "carrying" is on February 2, although this has almost disappeared due to many families packing nativity scenes on January 6. For all three, carryings, each image as a female sponsor called a "madrina" (godmother) who provides food and drink such as tamales and rompope and new clothing for the Jesus image.

One last tradition is "The Quema del Viejo" (Burning of the Old (Man)) occurs at midnight on December 31 after that evening's Acarreo.

== History ==
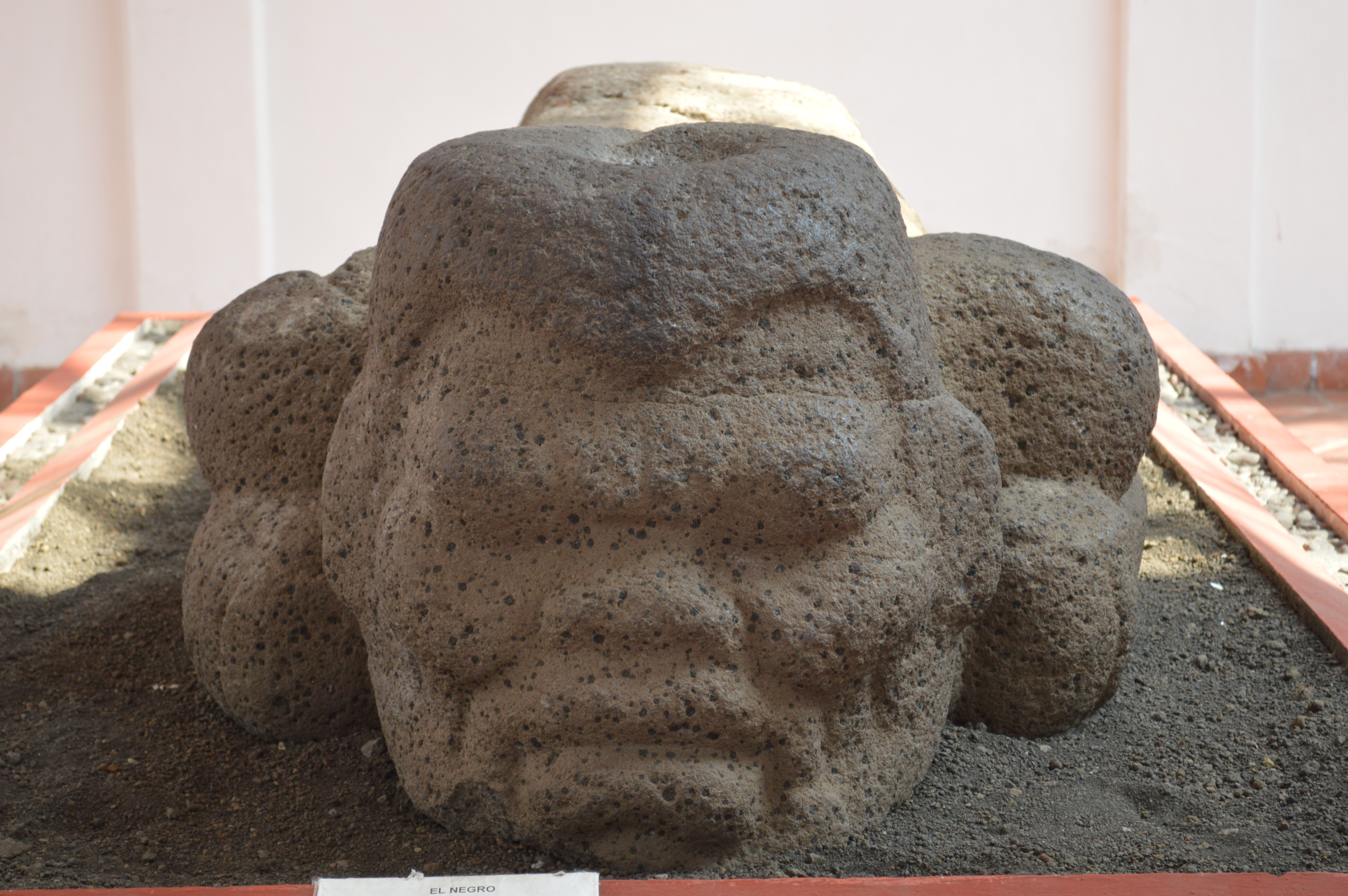
Colossal Olmec sculpture named "Negro" at the Museo Regional Tuxteco

Santiago refers to Saint James Moorslayer, the patron saint. The name "Tuxtla" (originally Toxtla) is derived from Nahuatl and means "place of the rabbit" in reference to the year of the Aztec calendar when the Empire conquered the area. Nahuatl was the main language of this area. According to the Tuxtla relación of 1580, the people of this area worshipped Huitzilopochtli (probably a result of Mexica influence), and they made stone and ceramic figures of him and sacrificed slaves to him. Priests were required to keep chaste.

In 1522, Cortés arrived to Totogatl, and established the Spanish town of Tepeaca. Here he installed a sugar mill. Santiago Tuxtla itself was founded in 1525. The area was part of Cortés' private lands given to him as the Marques del Valle by royal decree in 1531. The annual Santiago Tuxtla Fair began as a religious festival in 1525 and was converted to the current version in 1880.

The current main plaza was created in 1881, and in 1890 the Tower and Parish Clock were inaugurated. In 1931, the Angel R Cabada municipality separated from Santiago Tuxtla. The current municipality was created in 1932 with the name of Juan de la Luz Enríquez, with the seat at Santiago Tuxtla. In 1936, the municipality name was changed to match that of the seat. In 1950 the seat was officially designated a city and in 1974 it was declared a "colonial city."
