= Acajete, Veracruz =

Acajete
- Municipality
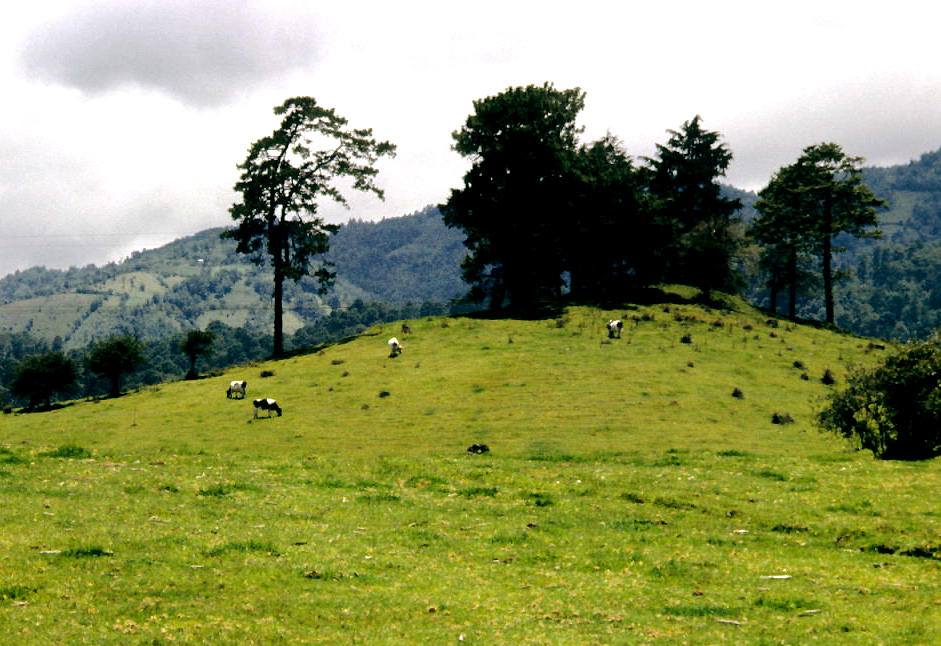
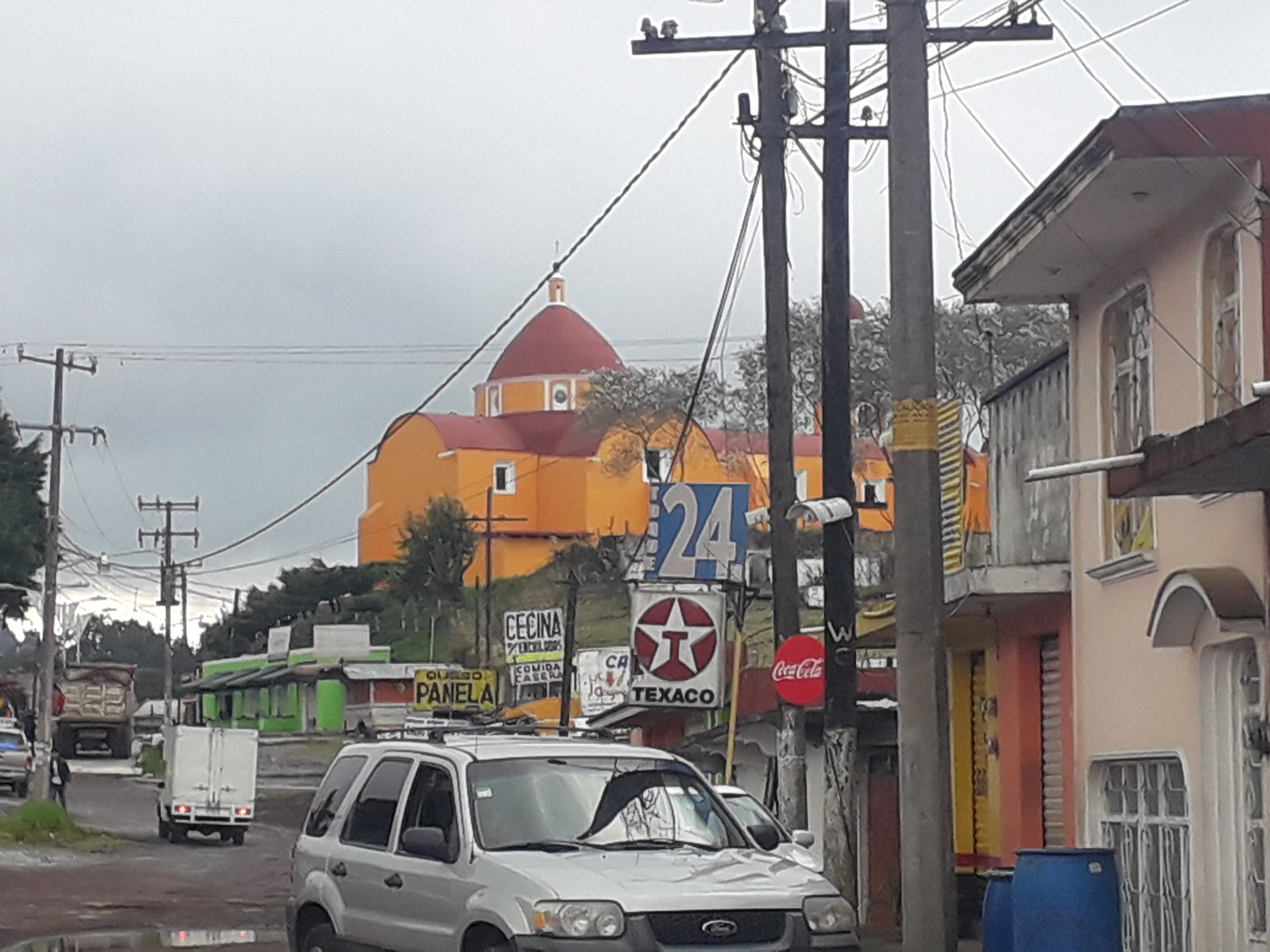
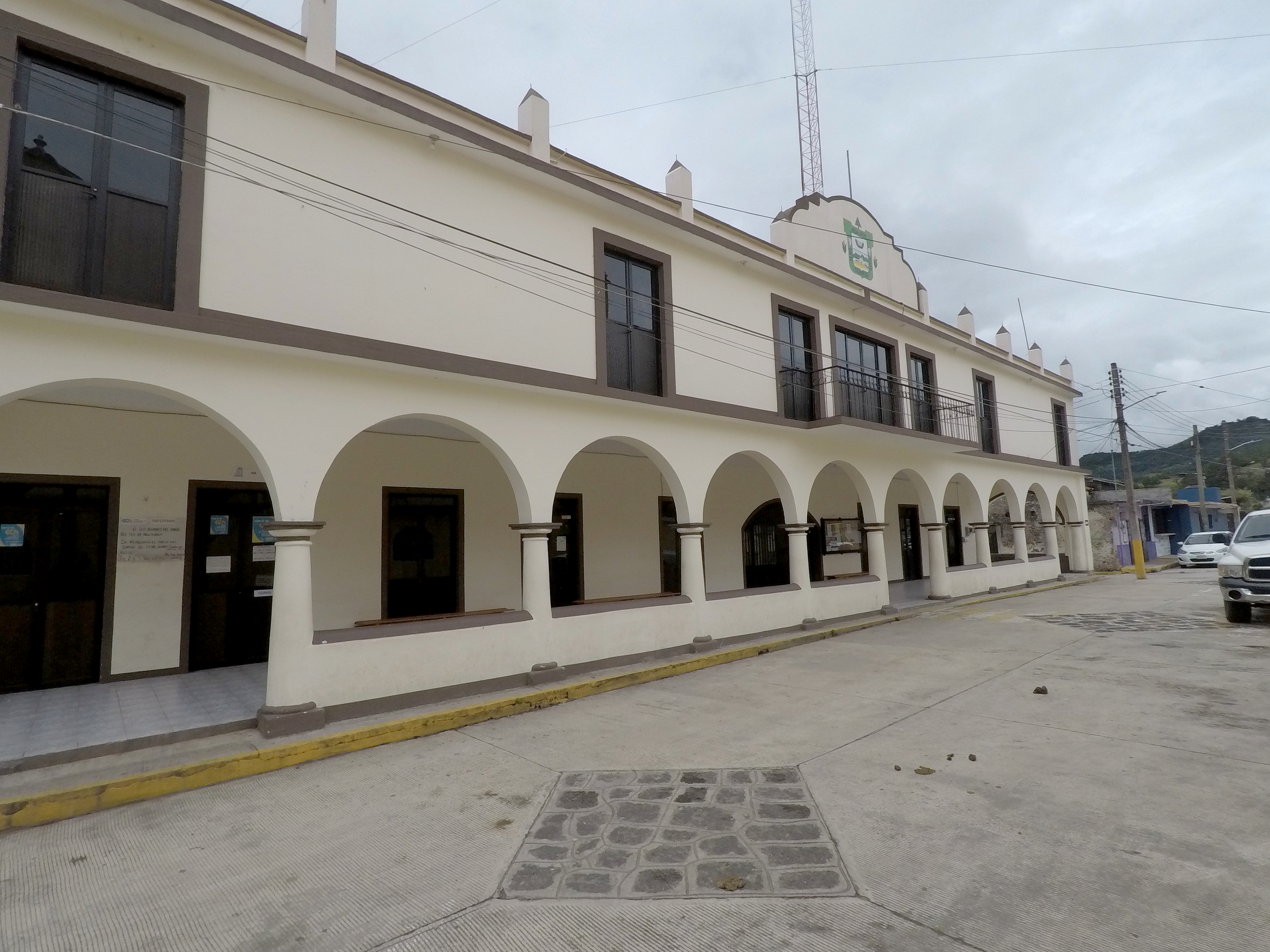
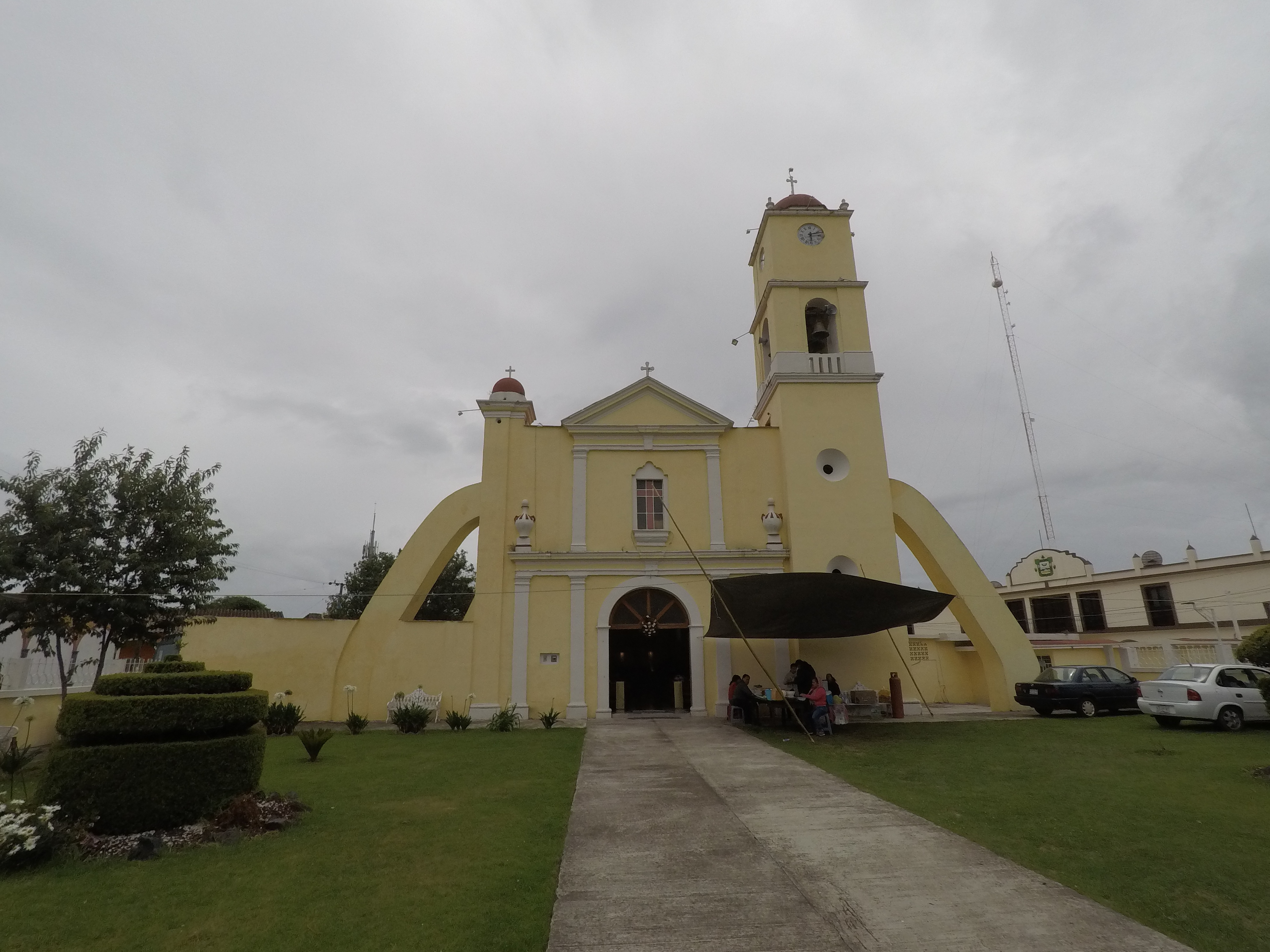
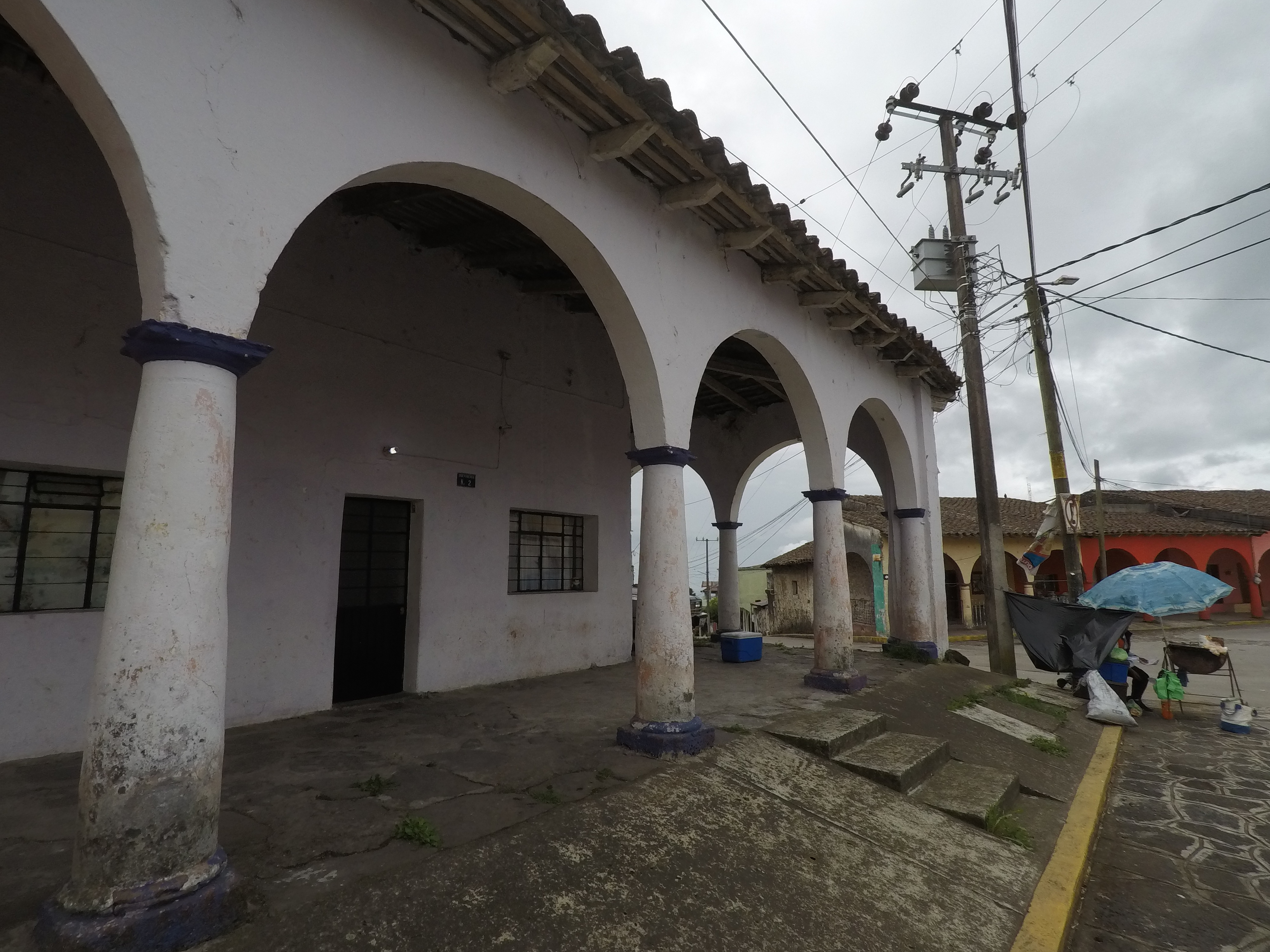
- Top: Acateje rural landscape; Middle: La Joya downtown, Acajete Municipal Palace; Bottom: San Salvador Parish, Acatepec Downtown

- Location in Mexico Acajete (Mexico)
- Coordinates: 19°34′59″N 97°00′00″W
- Country: Mexico
- State: Veracruz
- Region: Capital Region

Government
  - Mayor: Salvador Hernández Hernández (RSP)

Area
  - Total: 97.7 km^{2} (37.7 sq mi)
- Elevation (of seat): 2,374 m (7,789 ft)

Population (2020)
  - Total: 9,701
  - Density: 99.3/km^{2} (257/sq mi)
  - Seat: 1,854
- Time zone: UTC-6 (Central (US Central))
- Postal code (of seat): 30001
- Climate: ET
- Website: (in Spanish)

Historical population
| Year | Pop. | ±% |
|---|---|---|
| 1995 | 7,161 | — |
| 2000 | 7,514 | +4.9% |
| 2005 | 7,558 | +0.6% |
| 2010 | 8,223 | +8.8% |
| 2015 | 8,819 | +7.2% |
| 2020 | 9,701 | +10.0% |

Acajete is a municipality located in the central zone in the Mexican state of Veracruz, about 20 km from state capital Xalapa. It has a surface of 90.48 km^{2}. It is located at 19°58′N 97°00′W. In the middle of 1586 this village was formed, on one of the adjoining old men of Tlacolulan's dominion. The decree N ° 64 of November 3, 1893, extinguished the municipality of La Hoya, annexing its territory to San Salvador Acajete. On November 5, 1932, the municipal head-board San Salvador Acajete changes the name to Acajete.

== Agriculture ==
It produces principally maize, potatoes, apples, pears, and plums.

== Celebrations ==
In Acajete, a celebration in honor of San Salvador, the Patron of the town, takes place in August. In December, the residents celebrate in honor of Virgen de Guadalupe.

== Geography ==
Acajete Municipality is delimited to the north by Tlacolulan and Las Vigas de Ramírez to the east by Rafael Lucio, to the south by Tlalnelhuayocan and to the west by Perote. It is watered by affluent creeks of the Río Sedeño, which are tributaries of the Actopan. The principal creek is the Pixquiac.

=== Climate ===
Despite being in the tropics, due to its high altitude (2023 m or 6637 ft.), Acajete features a humid subtropical highland climate (Köppen climate classification: Cfb).

Climate data for Acajete
| Month | Jan | Feb | Mar | Apr | May | Jun | Jul | Aug | Sep | Oct | Nov | Dec | Year |
|---|---|---|---|---|---|---|---|---|---|---|---|---|---|
| Mean daily maximum °C (°F) | 17.3 (63.1) | 19.1 (66.4) | 21.4 (70.5) | 23.3 (73.9) | 23.7 (74.7) | 22.4 (72.3) | 21.3 (70.3) | 21.7 (71.1) | 20.4 (68.7) | 19.4 (66.9) | 18.2 (64.8) | 17.5 (63.5) | 20.5 (68.9) |
| Daily mean °C (°F) | 11.4 (52.5) | 13.0 (55.4) | 15.0 (59.0) | 16.8 (62.2) | 17.3 (63.1) | 16.8 (62.2) | 15.8 (60.4) | 16.0 (60.8) | 15.6 (60.1) | 14.3 (57.7) | 12.7 (54.9) | 11.8 (53.2) | 14.7 (58.5) |
| Mean daily minimum °C (°F) | 5.6 (42.1) | 6.9 (44.4) | 8.6 (47.5) | 10.4 (50.7) | 11.0 (51.8) | 11.2 (52.2) | 10.4 (50.7) | 10.4 (50.7) | 10.9 (51.6) | 9.2 (48.6) | 7.3 (45.1) | 6.2 (43.2) | 9.0 (48.2) |
| Average precipitation mm (inches) | 46 (1.8) | 50 (2.0) | 45 (1.8) | 63 (2.5) | 81 (3.2) | 251 (9.9) | 243 (9.6) | 219 (8.6) | 326 (12.8) | 148 (5.8) | 87 (3.4) | 62 (2.4) | 1,621 (63.8) |
| Average precipitation days (≥ 0.1 mm) | 16.4 | 20.1 | 21.4 | 23.7 | 28.1 | 28.7 | 28.9 | 30.4 | 29.3 | 28.7 | 27.4 | 23.8 | 306.9 |
| Average relative humidity (%) | 67 | 63 | 63 | 60 | 63 | 68 | 67 | 66 | 69 | 69 | 67 | 68 | 66 |
| Mean monthly sunshine hours | 143 | 133 | 166 | 155 | 159 | 138 | 215 | 168 | 132 | 145 | 154 | 142 | 1,850 |
Source: climate-data.org"NORMALES CLIMATOLÓGICAS".

== Demographics ==
As of 2020, the municipality had a population of 9,701 inhabitants. 20 % resides in the municipal seta of the same name (1,854 hab. Other localities includes La Joya (1,489 hab.), Mazatepec (1,234 hab.), Plan de Sedeño (654 hab.) and Acocota (646 hab.)
