= Tatatila =

- Municipality
- Location in Mexico Tatatila (Mexico)
- Coordinates: 19°42′00″N 97°07′00″W
- Country: Mexico
- State: Veracruz
- Region: Capital Region
- Municipal seat and largest town: Tatatila

Government
  - Mayor: Margarita Hernández Martínez (PRI)

Area
  - Total: 92 km^{2} (36 sq mi)
- Elevation (of seat): 1,100 m (3,600 ft)

Population (2020)
  - Total: 6,041
  - Density: 65.7/km^{2} (170/sq mi)
  - Seat: 1,072
- Time zone: UTC-6 (Central)
- Postal codes: 93760
- Area code: 282
- Website: www.tatatila.gob.mx/Official

Tatatila is a municipality located in the mountainous central zone of the Mexican state of Veracruz, about 26 km from the state capital Xalapa. It has a surface area of 82.25 km^{2}. It is located at 19°42′N 97°07′W.

== Geography ==
The municipality of Tatatila is delimited to the north by Altotonga, to the north-east by Tenochtitlan, to the east by Tlacolulan and Tenochtitlan, to the south by Las Vigas de Ramírez, and to the west by Las Minas and Villa Aldama. It is watered by small creeks tributaries of the river Nautla.

The weather in Tatatila is cold and wet all year with rains in summer and autumn.

== Demographics ==
Historical population
| Year | Pop. | ±% |
|---|---|---|
| 1995 | 3,961 | — |
| 2000 | 4,881 | +23.2% |
| 2005 | 5,273 | +8.0% |
| 2010 | 5,584 | +5.9% |
| 2015 | 5,767 | +3.3% |
| 2020 | 6,041 | +4.8% |

In 2020, Tatatila recorded population of 6,041 inhabitantes in 44 localities, all of them classified as rural. Tatatila, the municipal seat, contains nearly 20% of the population (1,072 hab.). Other localities include La Mancuerna (737 hab.), Pilhuatepec (532 hab.), Tenexpanoya (497 hab.) and Piedra Parada (483 hab.).

== Agriculture ==
It produces principally maize, beans and coffee.

== Celebrations ==
The celebration in honor of St. Peter the Apostle, patron of the town, occurs at the end of June, and the celebration in honor of the Virgin of Guadalupe occurs in December.
