= Municipalities of Veracruz =

List of municipalities of Mexican state

- Category: Second-level administrative divisions
- Location: State of Veracruz
- Found in: Mexico
- Created by: Constitution of 1824; Constitution of 1857; Constitution of 1917
- Created: 4 October 1824; 5 February 1857; 5 February 1917
- Abolished by: Site Leyes; Constitution of 1917
- Abolished: 15 December 1835; 5 February 1917
- Number: 212
- Populations: 1543–607,209 (Landero y Coss–Veracruz)
- Areas: 4.6–3,508.9 km^{2} (1.78–1,354.79 sq mi) (Oteapan–Las Choapas)
- Government: Ayuntamiento
- Subdivisions: Municipal seat; Manzanas; Congregaciones; Rancherías and caseríos

Veracruz is a state in eastern Mexico that is divided into 212 municipalities. According to the 2020 INEGI census, it is the fourth most populated state with 8,062,579 inhabitants and the 11th largest by land area spanning 71,823.5 square kilometres (27,731.2 sq mi).

Municipalities in Veracruz are administratively autonomous of the state according to the 115th article of the 1917 Constitution of Mexico. Every four years, citizens elect a municipal president (Spanish: presidente municipal) by a plurality voting system who heads a concurrently elected municipal council (ayuntamiento) responsible for providing all the public services for their constituents. The municipal council consists of a variable number of trustees and councillors (regidores y síndicos). Municipalities are responsible for public services (such as water and sewage), street lighting, public safety, traffic, and the maintenance of public parks, gardens and cemeteries. They may also assist the state and federal governments in education, emergency fire and medical services, environmental protection and maintenance of monuments and historical landmarks. Since 1984, they have had the power to collect property taxes and user fees, although more funds are obtained from the state and federal governments than from their own income.

The largest municipality by population is Veracruz, with 607,209 residents (7.53% of the state's total), while the smallest is Landero y Coss with 1,543 residents. The largest municipality by land area is Las Choapas which spans 3,508.90 km^{2} (1,354.79 sq mi), and the smallest is Oteapan with 4.60 km^{2} (1.78 sq mi). The newest municipalities were created in 2003: San Rafael and Santiago Sochiapan.

== Municipalities ==
Largest municipalities in Veracruz by population

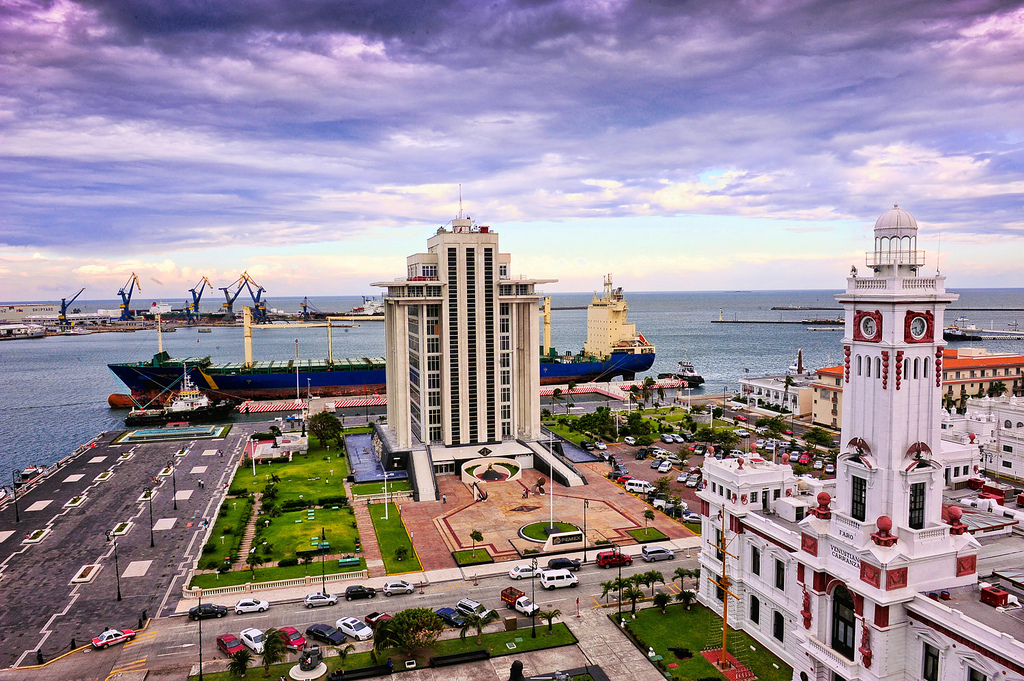
Veracruz, largest municipality by population in Veracruz

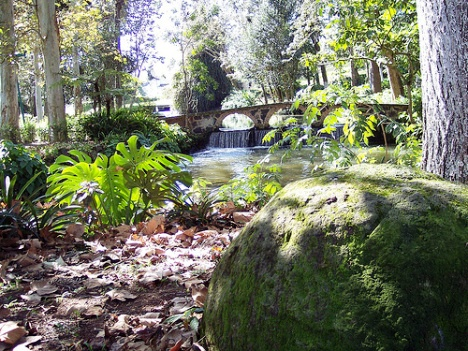
Xalapa, capital and second largest municipality by population

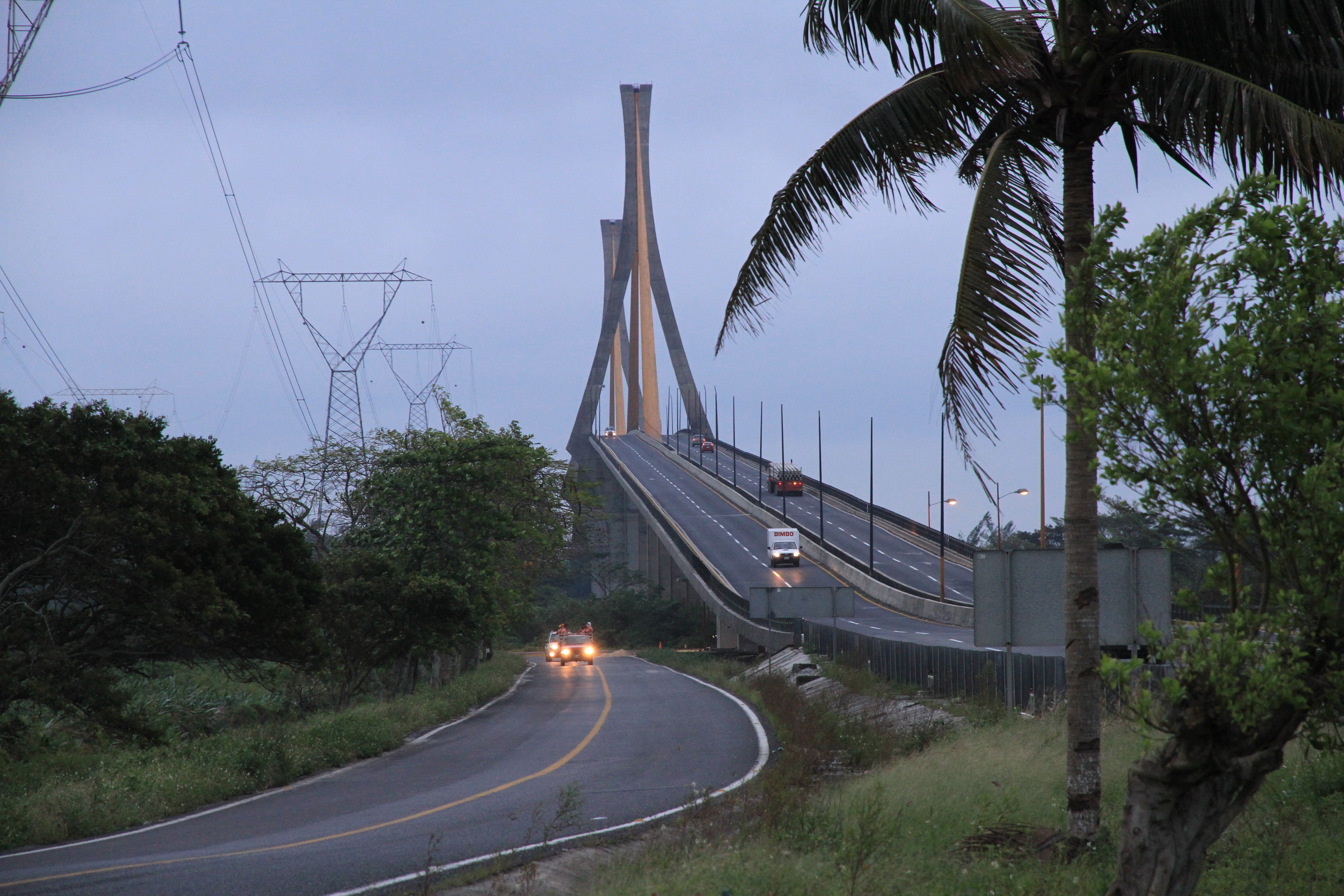
Coatzacoalcos is the third largest municipality by population.

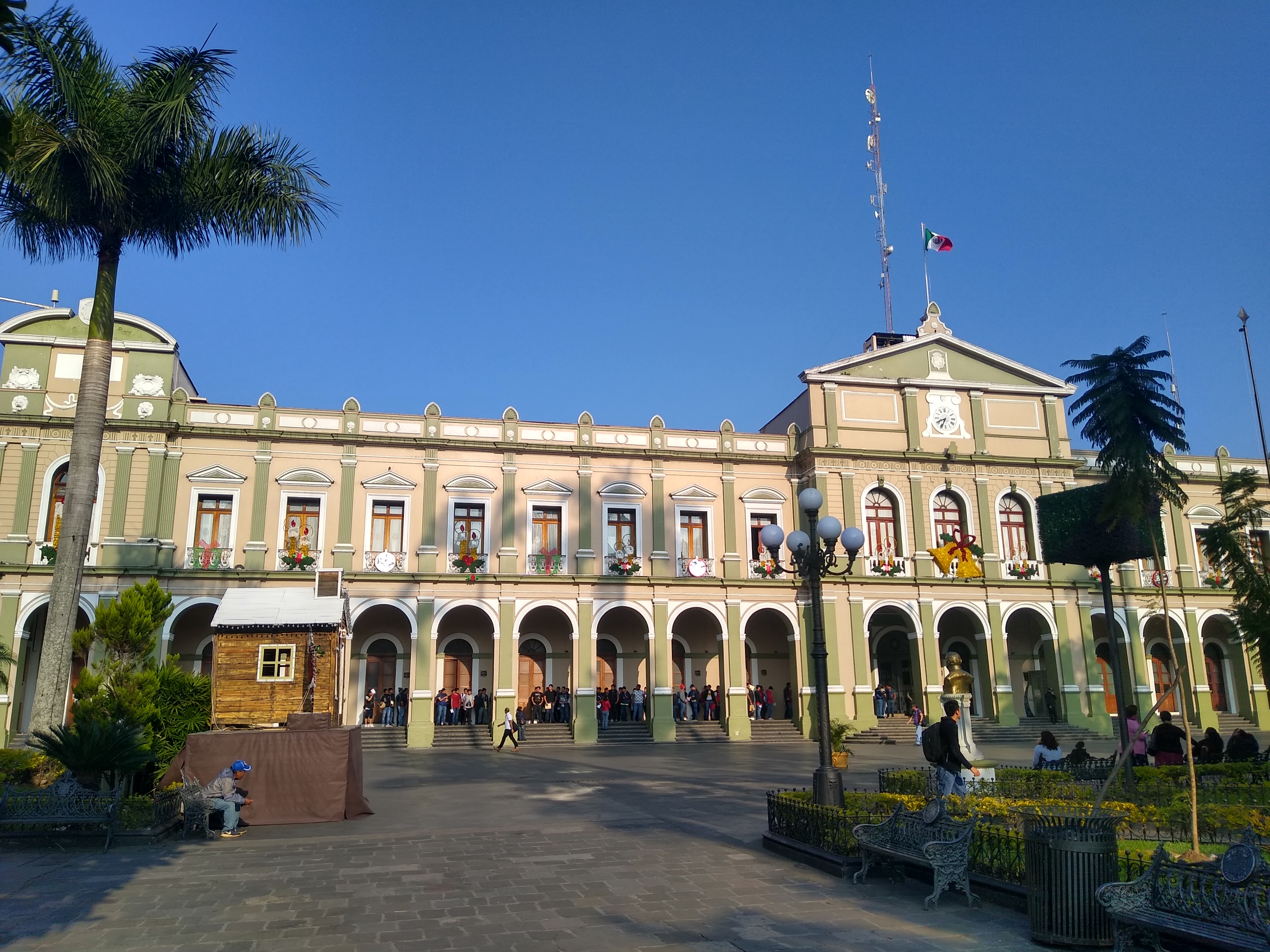
Córdoba, fourth largest municipality by population

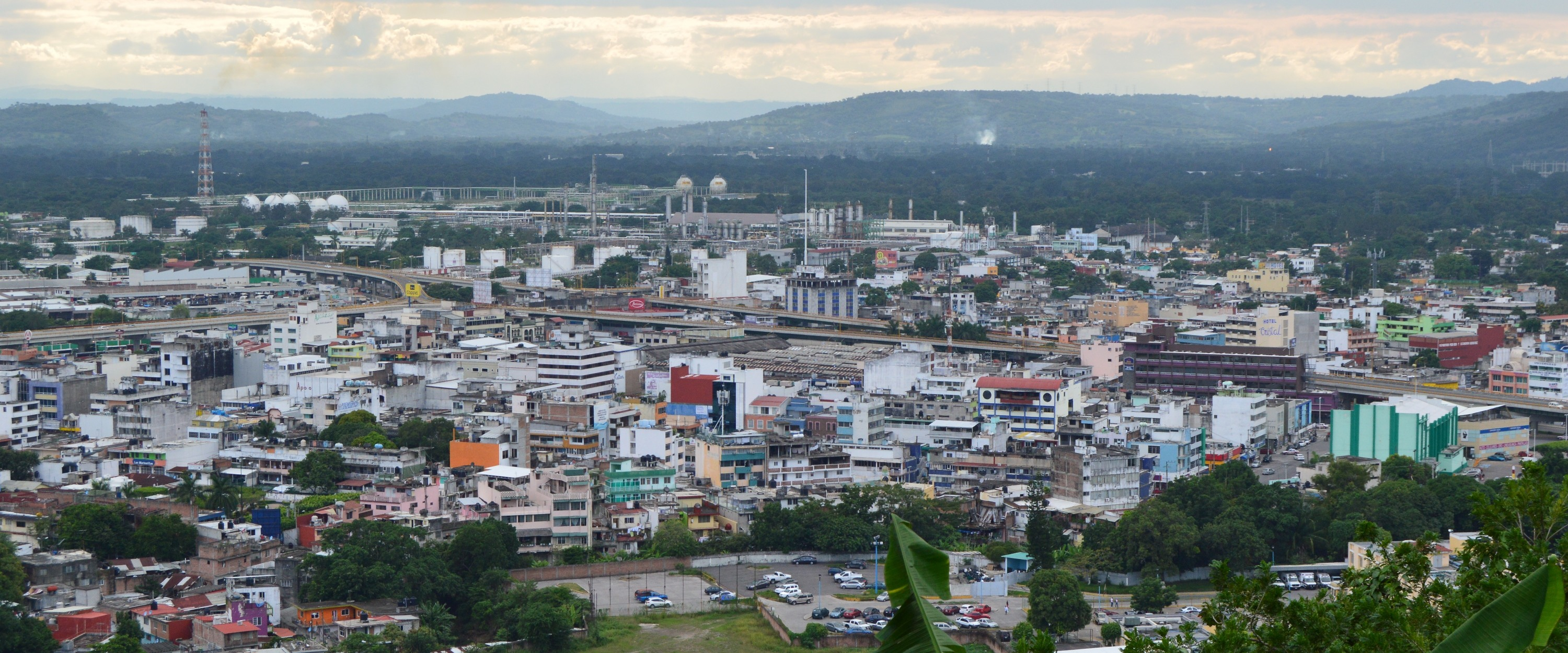
Poza Rica is the fifth largest municipality by population.

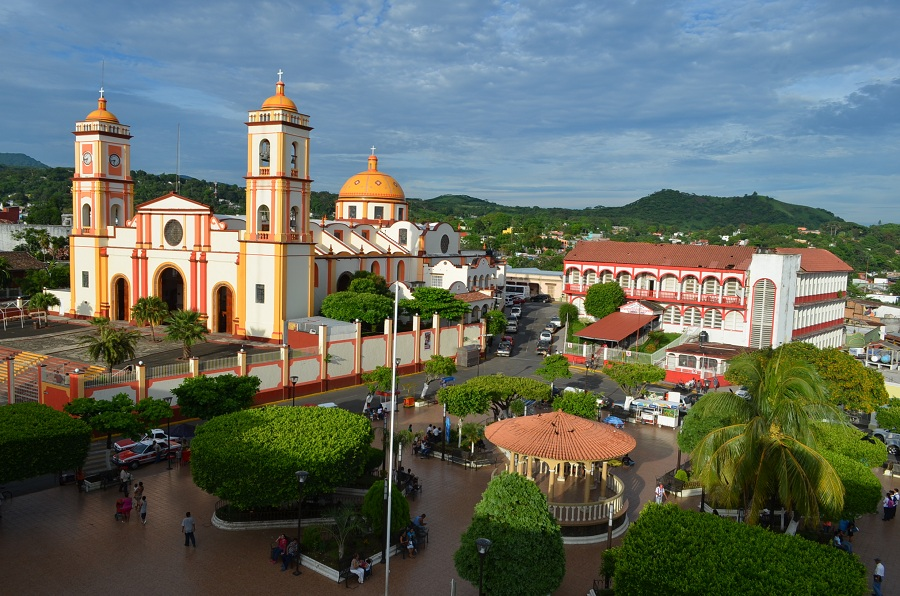
San Andrés Tuxtla is the sixth largest municipality by population.

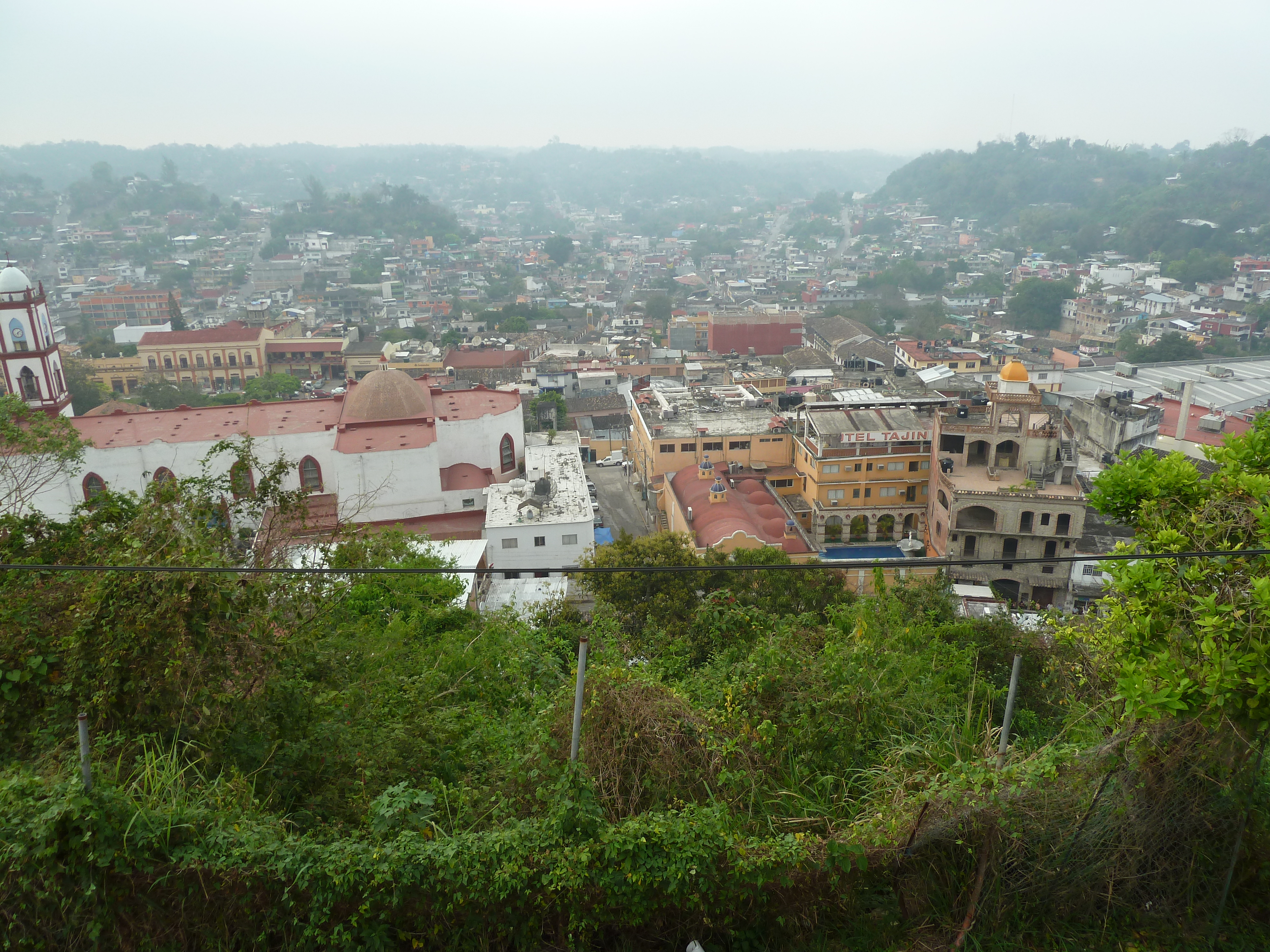
Papantla, the seventh largest municipality by population

† State capital

Municipalities of Veracruz
Municipal code	Name	Municipal seat	Population (2020)	Population (2010)	Change	Land area		Population density (2020)	Incorporation date
Municipal code	Name	Municipal seat	Population (2020)	Population (2010)	Change	km^{2}	sq mi	Population density (2020)	Incorporation date
001	Acajete	Acajete	9,701	8,223	+18.0%	97.5	37.6	99.5/km^{2} (257.7/sq mi)	December 1, 1868
002	Acatlán	Acatlán	3,441	3,085	+11.5%	18.3	7.1	188.0/km^{2} (487.0/sq mi)	December 1, 1868
003	Acayucan	Acayucan	80,815	83,817	−3.6%	655.7	253.2	123.2/km^{2} (319.2/sq mi)	September 27, 1824
004	Actopan	Actopan	41,742	40,994	+1.8%	859.5	331.9	48.6/km^{2} (125.8/sq mi)	March 28, 1831
005	Acula	Acula	5,253	5,129	+2.4%	195.0	75.3	26.9/km^{2} (69.8/sq mi)	March 28, 1831
006	Acultzingo	Acultzingo	23,100	20,973	+10.1%	168.9	65.2	136.8/km^{2} (354.2/sq mi)	March 28, 1831
204	Agua Dulce	Agua Dulce	44,104	46,010	−4.1%	372.4	143.8	118.4/km^{2} (306.7/sq mi)	November 26, 1988
160	Álamo Temapache (Note: Alamo Temapache was originally incorporated as Temapachi, changing its name on August 15, 2007.)	Álamo	107,270	104,499	+2.7%	1,277.1	493.1	84.0/km^{2} (217.5/sq mi)	May 27, 1837
008	Alpatláhuac	Alpatláhuac	10,338	9,691	+6.7%	70.9	27.4	145.8/km^{2} (377.6/sq mi)	March 28, 1831
009	Alto Lucero	Alto Lucero de Gutiérrez Barrios	28,184	28,017	+0.6%	648.3	250.3	43.5/km^{2} (112.6/sq mi)	January 25, 1930
010	Altotonga (Note: Altotonga was originally incorporated as Agua Caliente, changing its name on May 18, 1881.)	Altotonga	64,234	60,396	+6.4%	328.5	126.8	195.5/km^{2} (506.4/sq mi)	March 28, 1831
011	Alvarado	Alvarado	57,035	51,955	+9.8%	826.9	319.3	69.0/km^{2} (178.6/sq mi)	August 2, 1824
012	Amatitlán (Note: Amatitlán was originally incorporated as San Pedro Amatlán, changing its name on January 15, 1918.)	Amatitlán	7,866	7,487	+5.1%	135.1	52.2	58.2/km^{2} (150.8/sq mi)	March 28, 1831
014	Amatlán de los Reyes (Note: Amatlán de los Reyes was originally incorporated as Amatlán, changing its name on January 15, 1918.)	Amatlán de los Reyes	46,955	42,268	+11.1%	151.4	58.5	310.1/km^{2} (803.3/sq mi)	April 27, 1825
015	Angel R. Cabada	Angel R. Cabada	33,839	33,528	+0.9%	430.5	166.2	78.6/km^{2} (203.6/sq mi)	July 9, 1931
017	Apazapan	Apazapan	4,709	4,027	+16.9%	67.7	26.1	69.6/km^{2} (180.2/sq mi)	December 1, 1868
018	Aquila	Aquila	1,978	1,797	+10.1%	20.7	8.0	95.6/km^{2} (247.5/sq mi)	March 28, 1831
019	Astacinga	Astacinga	6,909	5,995	+15.2%	29.8	11.5	231.8/km^{2} (600.5/sq mi)	March 28, 1831
020	Atlahuilco	Atlahuilco	11,577	9,824	+17.8%	62.2	24.0	186.1/km^{2} (482.1/sq mi)	March 28, 1831
021	Atoyac	Atoyac	23,461	22,986	+2.1%	122.8	47.4	191.1/km^{2} (494.8/sq mi)	January 12, 1916
022	Atzacan	Atzacan	22,651	20,063	+12.9%	65.4	25.3	346.3/km^{2} (897.0/sq mi)	January 18, 1825
023	Atzalán	Atzalán	49,180	48,397	+1.6%	521.9	201.5	94.2/km^{2} (244.1/sq mi)	March 28, 1831
025	Ayahualulco	Ayahualulco	27,217	25,456	+6.9%	173.0	66.8	157.3/km^{2} (407.5/sq mi)	December 1, 1868
026	Banderilla	Banderilla	25,993	21,546	+20.6%	19.8	7.6	1,312.8/km^{2} (3,400.1/sq mi)	December 1, 1868
027	Benito Juárez (Note: Benito Juárez was originally incorporated as Cececapa, changing its name on July 2, 1889. It merged with Chicontepec in 1934-37.)	Benito Juárez	16,120	16,692	−3.4%	232.6	89.8	69.3/km^{2} (179.5/sq mi)	May 27, 1837
028	Boca del Río	Boca del Río	144,550	138,058	+4.7%	38.1	14.7	3,794.0/km^{2} (9,826.3/sq mi)	December 1, 1868
029	Calcahualco	Calcahualco	13,701	12,929	+6.0%	134.1	51.8	102.2/km^{2} (264.6/sq mi)	March 28, 1831
007	Camarón de Tejeda (Note: Camarón de Tejeda was originally incorporated as San José Temascal, changing its name on January 15, 1918.)	Camarón de Tejeda	6,538	6,224	+5.0%	124.1	47.9	52.7/km^{2} (136.4/sq mi)	March 28, 1831
030	Camerino Z. Mendoza (Note: Camerino Z. Mendoza was originally incorporated as Necoxtla, changing its name on November 19, 1932.)	Ciudad Mendoza	41,835	41,778	+0.1%	20.9	8.1	2,001.7/km^{2} (5,184.3/sq mi)	March 28, 1831
208	Carlos A. Carrillo	Carlos A. Carrillo	23,376	22,907	+2.0%	244.2	94.3	95.7/km^{2} (247.9/sq mi)	November 29, 1996
031	Carrillo Puerto (Note: Carrillo Puerto was originally incorporated as Santiago Huatusco, changing its name on November 29, 1932.)	Tamarindo	18,888	16,313	+15.8%	249.7	96.4	75.6/km^{2} (195.9/sq mi)	March 28, 1831
157	Castillo de Teayo	Castillo de Teayo	20,145	18,663	+7.9%	272.6	105.3	73.9/km^{2} (191.4/sq mi)	December 14, 1877
032	Catemaco	Catemaco	49,451	48,593	+1.8%	659.1	254.5	75.0/km^{2} (194.3/sq mi)	November 30, 1870
033	Cazones	Cazones de Herrera	24,421	23,483	+4.0%	272.3	105.1	89.7/km^{2} (232.3/sq mi)	June 9, 1936
034	Cerro Azul	Cerro Azul	25,011	25,801	−3.1%	91.0	35.1	274.8/km^{2} (711.8/sq mi)	December 3, 1963
054	Chacaltianguis	Chacaltianguis	11,461	11,683	−1.9%	290.5	112.2	39.5/km^{2} (102.2/sq mi)	March 28, 1831
055	Chalma	Chalma	13,527	12,626	+7.1%	152.0	58.7	89.0/km^{2} (230.5/sq mi)	November 24, 1938
056	Chiconamel	Chiconamel	6,610	6,752	−2.1%	92.6	35.8	71.4/km^{2} (184.9/sq mi)	March 28, 1831
057	Chiconquiaco (Note: Chiconquiaco merged with Acatlán in 1899-1911.)	Chiconquiaco	13,881	13,190	+5.2%	133.7	51.6	103.8/km^{2} (268.9/sq mi)	December 1, 1868
058	Chicontepec	Chicontepec de Tejeda	53,858	54,982	−2.0%	936.5	361.6	57.5/km^{2} (148.9/sq mi)	March 22, 1824
059	Chinameca	Chinameca	22,638	15,214	+48.8%	192.3	74.2	117.7/km^{2} (304.9/sq mi)	April 22, 1825
060	Chinampa	Chinampa de Gorostiza	16,283	15,286	+6.5%	140.2	54.1	116.1/km^{2} (300.8/sq mi)	October 16, 1874
062	Chocamán	Chocamán	20,839	18,601	+12.0%	44.3	17.1	470.4/km^{2} (1,218.3/sq mi)	July 13, 1826
063	Chontla	Chontla	13,359	14,688	−9.0%	390.5	150.8	34.2/km^{2} (88.6/sq mi)	December 1, 1868
064	Chumatlán (Note: Chumatlán merged with Coxquihui in 1890-1922 and with Coyutla in 1922-1936.)	Chumatlán	4,008	3,889	+3.1%	23.0	8.9	174.3/km^{2} (451.3/sq mi)	November 30, 1870
035	Citlaltépetl	Citlaltépetl	11,165	11,081	+0.8%	81.3	31.4	137.3/km^{2} (355.7/sq mi)	June 12, 1872
036	Coacoatzintla	Coacoatzintla	11,018	9,416	+17.0%	43.9	16.9	251.0/km^{2} (650.0/sq mi)	December 1, 1868
037	Coahuitlán	Progreso de Zaragoza	8,176	7,810	+4.7%	41.8	16.1	195.6/km^{2} (506.6/sq mi)	November 30, 1870
038	Coatepec	Coatepec	93,911	86,696	+8.3%	202.3	78.1	464.2/km^{2} (1,202.3/sq mi)	March 28, 1831
039	Coatzacoalcos	Coatzacoalcos	310,698	305,260	+1.8%	311.9	120.4	996.1/km^{2} (2,580.0/sq mi)	December 22, 1881
040	Coatzintla (Note: Coatzintla was originally incorporated as Coaquitla, changing its name on January 15, 1918.)	Coatzintla	55,016	48,351	+13.8%	277.7	107.2	198.1/km^{2} (513.1/sq mi)	November 30, 1870
041	Coetzala	Coetzala	2,355	2,144	+9.8%	9.4	3.6	250.5/km^{2} (648.9/sq mi)	March 28, 1831
042	Colipa	Colipa	5,743	5,728	+0.3%	130.4	50.3	44.0/km^{2} (114.1/sq mi)	December 1, 1868
043	Comapa	Comapa	19,876	18,713	+6.2%	310.9	120.0	63.9/km^{2} (165.6/sq mi)	March 28, 1831
044	Córdoba	Córdoba	204,721	196,541	+4.2%	159.9	61.7	1,280.3/km^{2} (3,316.0/sq mi)	January 3, 1825
045	Cosamaloapan	Cosamaloapan	54,737	57,366	−4.6%	519.1	200.4	105.4/km^{2} (273.1/sq mi)	May 26, 1825
046	Cosautlán	Cosautlán de Carvajal	16,167	15,668	+3.2%	76.6	29.6	211.1/km^{2} (546.6/sq mi)	December 1, 1868
047	Coscomatepec	Coscomatepec de Bravo	59,471	52,510	+13.3%	158.1	61.0	376.2/km^{2} (974.3/sq mi)	March 28, 1831
048	Cosoleacaque	Cosoleacaque	130,903	117,725	+11.2%	276.8	106.9	472.9/km^{2} (1,224.8/sq mi)	February 4, 1825
049	Cotaxtla	Cotaxtla	22,050	19,710	+11.9%	537.3	207.5	41.0/km^{2} (106.3/sq mi)	December 1, 1868
050	Coxquihui	Coxquihui	16,333	15,492	+5.4%	80.3	31.0	203.4/km^{2} (526.8/sq mi)	November 30, 1870
051	Coyutla	Coyutla	23,096	21,822	+5.8%	234.0	90.3	98.7/km^{2} (255.6/sq mi)	November 30, 1870
052	Cuichapa	Cuichapa	11,869	11,645	+1.9%	34.7	13.4	342.0/km^{2} (885.9/sq mi)	March 28, 1831
053	Cuitláhuac (Note: Cuitláhuac was originally incorporated as San Juan de la Punta, changing its name on November 29, 1932.)	Cuitláhuac	28,075	26,265	+6.9%	150.3	58.0	186.8/km^{2} (483.8/sq mi)	March 28, 1831
205	El Higo	El Higo	19,402	19,128	+1.4%	391.1	151.0	49.6/km^{2} (128.5/sq mi)	November 26, 1988
065	Emiliano Zapata (Note: Emiliano Zapata was originally incorporated as El Chico, changing its name on July 14, 1932.)	Dos Ríos	85,489	61,718	+38.5%	415.8	160.5	205.6/km^{2} (532.5/sq mi)	April 28, 1827
066	Espinal	Espinal	26,830	25,548	+5.0%	240.9	93.0	111.4/km^{2} (288.5/sq mi)	November 30, 1870
067	Filomeno Mata (Note: Filomeno Mata was originally incorporated as Santo Domingo, changing its name on November 29, 1932.)	Filomeno Mata	19,179	16,418	+16.8%	43.3	16.7	442.9/km^{2} (1,147.2/sq mi)	November 30, 1870
068	Fortín	Fortín de las Flores	66,372	59,761	+11.1%	61.2	23.6	1,084.5/km^{2} (2,808.9/sq mi)	July 15, 1930
069	Gutiérrez Zamora	Gutiérrez Zamora	24,085	24,353	−1.1%	179.5	69.3	134.2/km^{2} (347.5/sq mi)	July 21, 1877
070	Hidalgotitlán	Hidalgotitlán	18,275	18,277	0.0%	1,011.0	390.3	18.1/km^{2} (46.8/sq mi)	December 1, 1868
071	Huatusco	Huatusco	59,920	54,561	+9.8%	202.9	78.3	295.3/km^{2} (764.9/sq mi)	August 6, 1824
072	Huayacocotla	Huayacocotla	21,796	20,765	+5.0%	522.3	201.7	41.7/km^{2} (108.1/sq mi)	May 27, 1837
073	Hueyapan	Hueyapan de Ocampo	41,670	41,649	+0.1%	709.9	274.1	58.7/km^{2} (152.0/sq mi)	July 3, 1923
074	Huiloapan	Huiloapan de Cuauhtémoc	7,293	6,750	+8.0%	18.7	7.2	390.0/km^{2} (1,010.1/sq mi)	December 18, 1859
075	Ignacio de la Llave (Note: Ignacio de la Llave was originally incorporated as San Cristóbal de la Llave, changing its name on November 29, 1932.)	Ignacio de la Llave	16,525	17,121	−3.5%	396.9	153.2	41.6/km^{2} (107.8/sq mi)	July 3, 1885
076	Ilamatlán	Ilamatlán	13,377	13,575	−1.5%	155.3	60.0	86.1/km^{2} (223.1/sq mi)	May 27, 1837
077	Isla	Isla	42,807	42,205	+1.4%	926.9	357.9	46.2/km^{2} (119.6/sq mi)	December 7, 1967
078	Ixcatepec (Note: Ixcatepec was originally incorporated as Santa María, changing its name on January 15, 1918.)	Ixcatepec	12,379	12,713	−2.6%	176.9	68.3	70.0/km^{2} (181.2/sq mi)	December 1, 1868
079	Ixhuacán	Ixhuacán de los Reyes	11,387	10,724	+6.2%	149.8	57.8	76.0/km^{2} (196.9/sq mi)	March 28, 1831
083	Ixhuatlán de Madero	Ixhuatlán de Madero	50,836	49,820	+2.0%	669.2	258.4	76.0/km^{2} (196.7/sq mi)	May 27, 1837
080	Ixhuatlán del Café (Note: Ixhuatlán del Café was originally incorporated as San Pedro Ishuatán, changing its name on December 4, 1956.)	Ixhuatlán del Café	23,132	21,407	+8.1%	129.4	50.0	178.8/km^{2} (463.0/sq mi)	March 28, 1831
082	Ixhuatlán del Sureste (Note: Renamed Chapopotla in 1938-1960.)	Ixhuatlán del Sureste	15,831	14,903	+6.2%	156.7	60.5	101.0/km^{2} (261.7/sq mi)	December 1, 1868
081	Ixhuatlancillo	Ixhuatlancillo	27,295	21,150	+29.1%	52.4	20.2	520.9/km^{2} (1,349.1/sq mi)	March 28, 1831
084	Ixmatlahuacan	Ixmatlahuacan	5,574	5,727	−2.7%	347.3	134.1	16.0/km^{2} (41.6/sq mi)	March 28, 1831
085	Ixtaczoquitlán (Note: Ixtaczoquitlán was originally incorporated as Escamela, changing its name to Zoquitlán in 1831 and to its current name on June 25, 1885.)	Ixtaczoquitlán	74,004	65,385	+13.2%	137.4	53.1	538.6/km^{2} (1,395.0/sq mi)	August 3, 1824
086	Jalacingo	Jalacingo	46,794	40,747	+14.8%	208.1	80.3	224.9/km^{2} (582.4/sq mi)	May 26, 1825
088	Jalcomulco	Jalcomulco	5,054	4,940	+2.3%	72.7	28.1	69.5/km^{2} (180.1/sq mi)	December 1, 1868
089	Jáltipan	Jáltipan de Morelos	38,669	39,673	−2.5%	316.8	122.3	122.1/km^{2} (316.1/sq mi)	March 28, 1831
090	Jamapa	Jamapa	11,132	10,376	+7.3%	132.1	51.0	84.3/km^{2} (218.3/sq mi)	December 1, 1868
091	Jesús Carranza (Note: Jesús Carranza was originally incorporated as Suchilápam, changing its name to Santa Lucrecia in 1918 and to its current name on November 29, 1932.)	Jesús Carranza	28,524	27,080	+5.3%	1,413.0	545.6	20.2/km^{2} (52.3/sq mi)	December 4, 1879
093	Jilotepec	Jilotepec	16,585	15,313	+8.3%	56.3	21.7	294.6/km^{2} (763.0/sq mi)	March 28, 1831
169	José Azueta (Note: José Azueta was originally incorporated as Tesechoacán, changing its name on January 19, 1974.)	Villa Azueta	22,709	23,999	−5.4%	535.5	206.8	42.4/km^{2} (109.8/sq mi)	March 28, 1831
094	Juan Rodríguez Clara	Juan Rodríguez Clara	38,367	37,193	+3.2%	992.1	383.1	38.7/km^{2} (100.2/sq mi)	December 22, 1960
095	Juchique	Juchique de Ferrer	15,059	16,387	−8.1%	187.8	72.5	80.2/km^{2} (207.7/sq mi)	December 1, 1868
016	La Antigua	José Cardel	28,682	25,500	+12.5%	131.3	50.7	218.4/km^{2} (565.8/sq mi)	December 1, 1868
127	La Perla	La Perla	28,258	23,648	+19.5%	137.9	53.2	204.9/km^{2} (530.7/sq mi)	March 28, 1831
096	Landero y Coss (Note: Landero y Coss was originally incorporated as San Juan Miacatlán, changing its name on November 29, 1932.)	Landero y Coss	1,543	1,546	−0.2%	17.6	6.8	87.7/km^{2} (227.1/sq mi)	December 1, 1868
061	Las Choapas	Las Choapas	81,080	77,426	+4.7%	3,508.9	1,354.8	23.1/km^{2} (59.8/sq mi)	December 28, 1961
107	Las Minas	Las Minas	2,934	2,897	+1.3%	50.8	19.6	57.8/km^{2} (149.6/sq mi)	December 1, 1868
132	Las Vigas	Las Vigas de Ramírez	20,300	17,958	+13.0%	99.8	38.5	203.4/km^{2} (526.8/sq mi)	December 2, 1873
097	Lerdo de Tejada (Note: Lerdo de Tejada was originally incorporated as El Naranjal, changing its name on August 11, 1923.)	Lerdo de Tejada	19,123	20,141	−5.1%	84.0	32.4	227.7/km^{2} (589.6/sq mi)	January 23, 1923
137	Los Reyes	Los Reyes	6,308	5,484	+15.0%	34.2	13.2	184.4/km^{2} (477.7/sq mi)	March 28, 1831
098	Magdalena	Magdalena	3,299	2,920	+13.0%	13.8	5.3	239.1/km^{2} (619.2/sq mi)	March 28, 1831
099	Maltrata	Maltrata	18,327	16,898	+8.5%	110.6	42.7	165.7/km^{2} (429.2/sq mi)	March 28, 1831
100	Manlio Fabio Altamirano	Manlio Fabio Altamirano	23,918	22,585	+5.9%	247.1	95.4	96.8/km^{2} (250.7/sq mi)	June 17, 1937
101	Mariano Escobedo (Note: Mariano Escobedo was originally incorporated as Jesus María, changing its name on November 29, 1932.)	Mariano Escobedo	38,670	33,941	+13.9%	69.5	26.8	556.4/km^{2} (1,441.1/sq mi)	December 1, 1868
102	Martínez de la Torre	Martínez de la Torre	108,842	101,358	+7.4%	398.7	153.9	273.0/km^{2} (707.0/sq mi)	October 27, 1882
103	Mecatlán	Mecatlán	12,799	11,808	+8.4%	43.6	16.8	293.6/km^{2} (760.3/sq mi)	November 30, 1870
104	Mecayapan	Mecayapan	17,134	17,333	−1.1%	296.5	114.5	57.8/km^{2} (149.7/sq mi)	December 1, 1868
105	Medellín	Medellín	95,202	59,126	+61.0%	397.3	153.4	239.6/km^{2} (620.6/sq mi)	December 1, 1868
106	Miahuatlán	Miahuatlán	4,841	4,429	+9.3%	29.5	11.4	164.1/km^{2} (425.0/sq mi)	December 1, 1868
108	Minatitlán	Minatitlán	144,776	157,840	−8.3%	2,118.0	817.8	68.4/km^{2} (177.0/sq mi)	November 18, 1857
109	Misantla	Misantla	65,761	62,919	+4.5%	523.4	202.1	125.6/km^{2} (325.4/sq mi)	May 26, 1825
110	Mixtla	Mixtla de Altamirano	12,125	10,387	+16.7%	66.5	25.7	182.3/km^{2} (472.2/sq mi)	March 28, 1831
111	Moloacán	Moloacán	16,493	16,120	+2.3%	249.6	96.4	66.1/km^{2} (171.1/sq mi)	December 1, 1868
206	Nanchital	Nanchital de Lázaro Cárdenas del Río	29,209	27,094	+7.8%	28.3	10.9	1,032.1/km^{2} (2,673.2/sq mi)	November 26, 1988
112	Naolinco	Naolinco de Victoria	22,835	20,255	+12.7%	108.4	41.9	210.7/km^{2} (545.6/sq mi)	January 21, 1825
113	Naranjal	Naranjal	4,614	4,507	+2.4%	18.6	7.2	248.1/km^{2} (642.5/sq mi)	March 28, 1831
13	Naranjos Amatlán (Note: Naranjos Amatlán was originally incorporated as Amatlán Tuxpan, changing its name on June 22, 1996.)	Naranjos	26,843	27,548	−2.6%	136.0	52.5	197.4/km^{2} (511.2/sq mi)	May 27, 1837
114	Nautla	Nautla	10,130	9,974	+1.6%	355.6	137.3	28.5/km^{2} (73.8/sq mi)	December 1, 1868
115	Nogales	Nogales	37,314	34,688	+7.6%	64.4	24.9	579.4/km^{2} (1,500.7/sq mi)	March 28, 1831
116	Oluta	Oluta	17,027	14,784	+15.2%	78.0	30.1	218.3/km^{2} (565.4/sq mi)	December 1, 1868
117	Omealca (Note: Omealca was originally incorporated as San Antonio Tenejapa, changing its name on November 29, 1962.)	Omealca	23,773	22,561	+5.4%	213.8	82.5	111.2/km^{2} (288.0/sq mi)	March 28, 1831
118	Orizaba	Orizaba	123,182	120,995	+1.8%	27.7	10.7	4,447.0/km^{2} (11,517.7/sq mi)	May 26, 1825
119	Otatitlán	Otatitlán	5,651	5,250	+7.6%	49.8	19.2	113.5/km^{2} (293.9/sq mi)	March 28, 1831
120	Oteapan	Oteapan	10,343	14,965	−30.9%	4.6	1.8	2,248.5/km^{2} (5,823.5/sq mi)	December 1, 1868
121	Ozuluama (Note: Ozuluama was originally incorporated as Tampico, changing its name on February 18, 1871.)	Ozuluama de Mascareñas	22,756	23,276	−2.2%	2,391.6	923.4	9.5/km^{2} (24.6/sq mi)	May 26, 1825
122	Pajapan	Pajapan	18,051	15,909	+13.5%	311.7	120.3	57.9/km^{2} (150.0/sq mi)	December 1, 1868
123	Pánuco	Pánuco	96,185	97,290	−1.1%	3,168.1	1,223.2	30.4/km^{2} (78.6/sq mi)	March 28, 1831
124	Papantla	Papantla de Olarte	159,910	158,599	+0.8%	1,456.5	562.4	109.8/km^{2} (284.4/sq mi)	May 25, 1824
126	Paso de Ovejas	Paso de Ovejas	33,442	32,576	+2.7%	388.1	149.8	86.2/km^{2} (223.2/sq mi)	December 1, 1868
125	Paso del Macho	Paso del Macho	31,894	29,165	+9.4%	400.6	154.7	79.6/km^{2} (206.2/sq mi)	October 9, 1884
128	Perote	Perote	77,432	68,982	+12.2%	609.1	235.2	127.1/km^{2} (329.3/sq mi)	March 28, 1831
129	Platón Sánchez	Platón Sánchez	18,053	17,888	+0.9%	244.8	94.5	73.7/km^{2} (191.0/sq mi)	December 10, 1868
130	Playa Vicente	Playa Vicente	39,327	40,984	−4.0%	1,192.7	460.5	33.0/km^{2} (85.4/sq mi)	August 2, 1873
131	Poza Rica	Poza Rica de Hidalgo	189,457	193,311	−2.0%	64.1	24.7	2,955.6/km^{2} (7,655.1/sq mi)	November 13, 1951
133	Pueblo Viejo	Ciudad Cuauhtémoc	57,909	55,358	+4.6%	288.7	111.5	200.6/km^{2} (519.5/sq mi)	January 25, 1825
134	Puente Nacional	Puente Nacional	23,544	21,603	+9.0%	384.1	148.3	61.3/km^{2} (158.8/sq mi)	December 1, 1868
135	Rafael Delgado (Note: Rafael Delgado was originally incorporated as San Juan del Río, changing its name on November 29, 1923.)	Rafael Delgado	24,127	20,245	+19.2%	26.4	10.2	913.9/km^{2} (2,367.0/sq mi)	March 28, 1831
136	Rafael Lucio (Note: Rafael Lucio was originally incorporated as San Miguel del Soldado, changing its name on November 29, 1923.)	Rafael Lucio	8,343	7,023	+18.8%	11.5	4.4	725.5/km^{2} (1,879.0/sq mi)	December 1, 1868
138	Río Blanco (Note: Río Blanco was originally incorporated as Tenango, changing its name on January 15, 1918.)	Río Blanco	41,795	40,634	+2.9%	15.2	5.9	2,749.7/km^{2} (7,121.6/sq mi)	December 18, 1859
139	Saltabarranca (Note: Saltabarranca merged with Veracruz in 1831-1868.)	Saltabarranca	6,126	5,908	+3.7%	108.5	41.9	56.5/km^{2} (146.2/sq mi)	September 15, 1824
140	San Andrés Tenejapan (Note: San Andrés Tenejapan was renamed Ciriaco Vázquez in 1932-1940.)	San Andrés Tenejapan	3,134	2,715	+15.4%	21.9	8.5	143.1/km^{2} (370.6/sq mi)	March 28, 1831
141	San Andrés Tuxtla (Note: San Andrés Tuxtla was renamed Los Tuxtlas in 1932-38.)	San Andrés Tuxtla	162,428	157,364	+3.2%	956.9	369.5	169.7/km^{2} (439.6/sq mi)	May 26, 1825
142	San Juan Evangelista (Note: San Juan Evangelista was renamed Santana Rodríguez in 1932-39.)	San Juan Evangelista	32,631	33,435	−2.4%	1,261.7	487.1	25.9/km^{2} (67.0/sq mi)	December 1, 1868
211	San Rafael	San Rafael	30,351	29,277	+3.7%	291.9	112.7	104.0/km^{2} (269.3/sq mi)	December 15, 2003
212	Santiago Sochiapan	Xochiapa	13,062	12,409	+5.3%	399.1	154.1	32.7/km^{2} (84.8/sq mi)	December 15, 2003
212	Santiago Tuxtla (Note: Santiago Tuxtla was renamed Juan de la Luz Enríquez in 1932-36.)	Santiago Tuxtla	57,085	56,427	+1.2%	617.8	238.5	92.4/km^{2} (239.3/sq mi)	May 1, 1829
144	Sayula	Sayula de Alemán	32,400	31,974	+1.3%	662.5	255.8	48.9/km^{2} (126.7/sq mi)	December 1, 1868
146	Sochiapa	Sochiapa	3,925	3,502	+12.1%	16.3	6.3	240.8/km^{2} (623.7/sq mi)	March 28, 1831
145	Soconusco (Note: Soconusco was merged with Acayucan in 1922-26.)	Soconusco	16,574	14,395	+15.1%	96.3	37.2	172.1/km^{2} (445.8/sq mi)	March 28, 1831
147	Soledad Atzompa	Soledad Atzompa	24,578	21,380	+15.0%	114.7	44.3	214.3/km^{2} (555.0/sq mi)	March 28, 1831
148	Soledad de Doblado	Soledad de Doblado	28,130	27,008	+4.2%	416.1	160.7	67.6/km^{2} (175.1/sq mi)	December 1, 1868
149	Soteapan (Note: Soteapan was originally incorporated as San Pedro Joteapa, changing its name on January 15, 1918.)	Soteapan	34,385	32,596	+5.5%	479.8	185.3	71.7/km^{2} (185.6/sq mi)	March 28, 1831
150	Tamalín	Tamalín	11,631	11,211	+3.7%	400.0	154.4	29.1/km^{2} (75.3/sq mi)	November 13, 1875
151	Tamiahua (Note: Tamiahua was originally incorporated as Tamahoa, changing its name on November 1, 1881.)	Tamiahua	21,902	23,588	−7.1%	1,017.9	393.0	21.5/km^{2} (55.7/sq mi)	May 27, 1837
152	Tampico Alto	Tampico Alto	11,561	12,242	−5.6%	874.8	337.8	13.2/km^{2} (34.2/sq mi)	May 26, 1825
153	Tancoco	Tancoco	5,795	5,873	−1.3%	156.2	60.3	37.1/km^{2} (96.1/sq mi)	December 1, 1868
154	Tantima	Tantima	11,991	12,814	−6.4%	333.6	128.8	35.9/km^{2} (93.1/sq mi)	December 1, 1868
155	Tantoyuca	Tantoyuca	99,959	101,743	−1.8%	1,302.3	502.8	76.8/km^{2} (198.8/sq mi)	November 4, 1845
209	Tatahuicapan	Tatahuicapan de Juárez	15,044	14,297	+5.2%	295.0	113.9	51.0/km^{2} (132.1/sq mi)	March 19, 1997
156	Tatatila	Tatatila	6,041	5,584	+8.2%	91.9	35.5	65.7/km^{2} (170.3/sq mi)	December 1, 1868
158	Tecolutla	Tecolutla	24,551	25,126	−2.3%	531.1	205.1	46.2/km^{2} (119.7/sq mi)	December 15, 1879
159	Tehuipango	Tehuipango	29,686	23,479	+26.4%	87.9	33.9	337.7/km^{2} (874.7/sq mi)	March 28, 1831
161	Tempoal	Tempoal	34,408	34,956	−1.6%	1,152.4	444.9	29.9/km^{2} (77.3/sq mi)	December 1, 1868
162	Tenampa	Tenampa	6,448	6,247	+3.2%	65.2	25.2	98.9/km^{2} (256.1/sq mi)	December 1, 1868
163	Tenochtitlán	Tenochtitlán	5,040	5,222	−3.5%	86.8	33.5	58.1/km^{2} (150.4/sq mi)	July 9, 1931
164	Teocelo	Teocelo	16,957	16,327	+3.9%	60.8	23.5	278.9/km^{2} (722.3/sq mi)	March 28, 1831
165	Tepatlaxco	Tepatlaxco	8,925	8,249	+8.2%	60.2	23.2	148.3/km^{2} (384.0/sq mi)	March 28, 1831
166	Tepetlán	Tepetlán	9,405	9,004	+4.5%	95.5	36.9	98.5/km^{2} (255.1/sq mi)	December 1, 1868
167	Tepetzintla	Tepetzintla	14,619	13,949	+4.8%	227.3	87.8	64.3/km^{2} (166.6/sq mi)	December 1, 1868
168	Tequila (Note: Tequila was renamed Roa Bárcena in 1932-45.)	Tequila	16,343	14,648	+11.6%	100.0	38.6	163.4/km^{2} (423.3/sq mi)	July 22, 1824
170	Texcatepec (Note: Texcatepec was merged with Huayacocotla, Zontecomatlán, Zacualpan and Tlachichilco in 1891-1918.)	Texcatepec	10,824	10,627	+1.9%	195.2	75.4	55.5/km^{2} (143.6/sq mi)	December 1, 1868
171	Texhuacán	Texhuacán	5,575	5,292	+5.3%	42.7	16.5	130.6/km^{2} (338.2/sq mi)	March 28, 1831
172	Texistepec	Texistepec	19,925	20,199	−1.4%	449.0	173.4	44.4/km^{2} (114.9/sq mi)	March 28, 1831
173	Tezonapa	Tezonapa	54,537	52,584	+3.7%	522.5	201.7	104.4/km^{2} (270.3/sq mi)	December 22, 1960
174	Tierra Blanca	Tierra Blanca	95,602	94,087	+1.6%	1,517.9	586.1	63.0/km^{2} (163.1/sq mi)	June 19, 1915
175	Tihuatlán	Tihuatlán	92,726	89,774	+3.3%	718.4	277.4	129.1/km^{2} (334.3/sq mi)	December 1, 1868
180	Tlachichilco	Tlachichilco	10,900	11,276	−3.3%	225.7	87.1	48.3/km^{2} (125.1/sq mi)	May 27, 1837
176	Tlacojalpan	Tlacojalpan	4,489	4,632	−3.1%	102.7	39.7	43.7/km^{2} (113.2/sq mi)	March 28, 1831
177	Tlacolulan	Tlacolulan	11,685	10,299	+13.5%	133.5	51.5	87.5/km^{2} (226.7/sq mi)	December 1, 1868
178	Tlacotalpan	Tlacotalpan	12,898	13,284	−2.9%	578.5	223.4	22.3/km^{2} (57.7/sq mi)	July 28, 1824
179	Tlacotepec	Tlacotepec de Mejía	4,284	3,965	+8.0%	65.3	25.2	65.6/km^{2} (169.9/sq mi)	December 1, 1868
181	Tlalixcoyan	Tlalixcoyan	37,795	37,037	+2.0%	917.9	354.4	41.2/km^{2} (106.6/sq mi)	June 17, 1825
182	Tlalnelhuayocan	Tlalnelhuayocan	19,664	16,311	+20.6%	36.7	14.2	535.8/km^{2} (1,387.7/sq mi)	December 1, 1868
024	Tlaltetela (Note: Tlaltetela was originally incorporated as Axocuápam, changing its name on July 14, 1979.)	Tlaltetela	16,485	14,613	+12.8%	277.8	107.3	59.3/km^{2} (153.7/sq mi)	December 1, 1868
183	Tlapacoyan	Tlapacoyan	61,377	58,084	+5.7%	168.0	64.9	365.3/km^{2} (946.2/sq mi)	May 30, 1826
184	Tlaquilpa	Tlaquilpa	7,933	7,151	+10.9%	56.4	21.8	140.7/km^{2} (364.3/sq mi)	March 28, 1831
185	Tlilapan	Tlilapan	5,548	4,879	+13.7%	11.2	4.3	495.4/km^{2} (1,283.0/sq mi)	March 28, 1831
186	Tomatlán	Tomatlán	7,197	6,763	+6.4%	18.8	7.3	382.8/km^{2} (991.5/sq mi)	January 18, 1825
187	Tonayán	Tonayán	6,105	5,696	+7.2%	50.2	19.4	121.6/km^{2} (315.0/sq mi)	December 1, 1868
188	Totutla	Totutla	17,217	16,403	+5.0%	97.9	37.8	175.9/km^{2} (455.5/sq mi)	March 28, 1831
207	Tres Valles	Tres Valles	44,978	45,095	−0.3%	547.7	211.5	82.1/km^{2} (212.7/sq mi)	November 26, 1988
189	Tuxpan	Túxpam de Rodriguez Cano	154,600	143,362	+7.8%	964.3	372.3	160.3/km^{2} (415.2/sq mi)	December 7, 1825
190	Tuxtilla	Tuxtilla	2,258	2,177	+3.7%	56.1	21.7	40.2/km^{2} (104.2/sq mi)	December 1, 1868
191	Úrsulo Galván (Note: Úrsulo Galván was originally incorporated as San Carlos, changing its name on November 29, 1932.)	Úrsulo Galván	30,097	29,005	+3.8%	124.2	48.0	242.3/km^{2} (627.6/sq mi)	December 1, 1868
210	Uxpanapa	Poblado 10	30,891	27,346	+13.0%	1,960.6	757.0	15.8/km^{2} (40.8/sq mi)	January 31, 1997
192	Vega de Alatorre	Vega de Alatorre	20,204	19,541	+3.4%	338.6	130.7	59.7/km^{2} (154.5/sq mi)	December 1, 1868
193	Veracruz	Veracruz	607,209	552,156	+10.0%	247.1	95.4	2,457.3/km^{2} (6,364.5/sq mi)	May 26, 1825
194	Villa Aldama	Villa Aldama	12,492	10,851	+15.1%	51.5	19.9	242.6/km^{2} (628.2/sq mi)	June 18, 1929
087	Xalapa	Xalapa-Enríquez†	488,531	457,928	+6.7%	124.6	48.1	3,920.8/km^{2} (10,154.8/sq mi)	May 26, 1825
092	Xico (Note: Xico was originally incorporated as Jicochimalco, changing its name on August 13, 1875.)	Xico	39,623	35,188	+12.6%	179.0	69.1	221.4/km^{2} (573.3/sq mi)	March 28, 1831
195	Xoxocotla	Xoxocotla	5,900	5,163	+14.3%	37.4	14.4	157.8/km^{2} (408.6/sq mi)	November 30, 1870
196	Yanga (Note: Yanga was originally incorporated as San Lorenzo Serralvo, changing its name on November 29, 1932.)	Yanga	17,902	17,462	+2.5%	87.9	33.9	203.7/km^{2} (527.5/sq mi)	March 28, 1831
197	Yecuatla	Yecuatla	11,205	11,357	−1.3%	112.5	43.4	99.6/km^{2} (258.0/sq mi)	December 1, 1868
198	Zacualpan	Zacualpan	6,788	6,784	+0.1%	263.7	101.8	25.7/km^{2} (66.7/sq mi)	November 13, 1875
199	Zaragoza	Zaragoza	11,899	10,720	+11.0%	21.7	8.4	548.3/km^{2} (1,420.2/sq mi)	December 1, 1868
200	Zentla	Colonia Manuel González	12,581	12,379	+1.6%	178.1	68.8	70.6/km^{2} (183.0/sq mi)	December 1, 1868
201	Zongolica	Zongolica	45,028	41,923	+7.4%	282.6	109.1	159.3/km^{2} (412.7/sq mi)	May 4, 1825
202	Zontecomatlán	Zontecomatlán de López y Fuentes	14,644	13,866	+5.6%	242.1	93.5	60.5/km^{2} (156.7/sq mi)	May 27, 1837
203	Zozocolco	Zozocolco de Hidalgo	14,524	13,434	+8.1%	68.9	26.6	210.8/km^{2} (546.0/sq mi)	November 30, 1870
	Veracruz	—	8,062,579	7,643,194	+5.5%	71,823.5	27,731.2	112.3/km^{2} (290.7/sq mi)	—
	Mexico	—	126,014,024	112,336,538	+12.2%	1,960,646.7	757,010	64.3/km^{2} (166.5/sq mi)	—
