= Cosautlán de Carvajal =

- Municipality
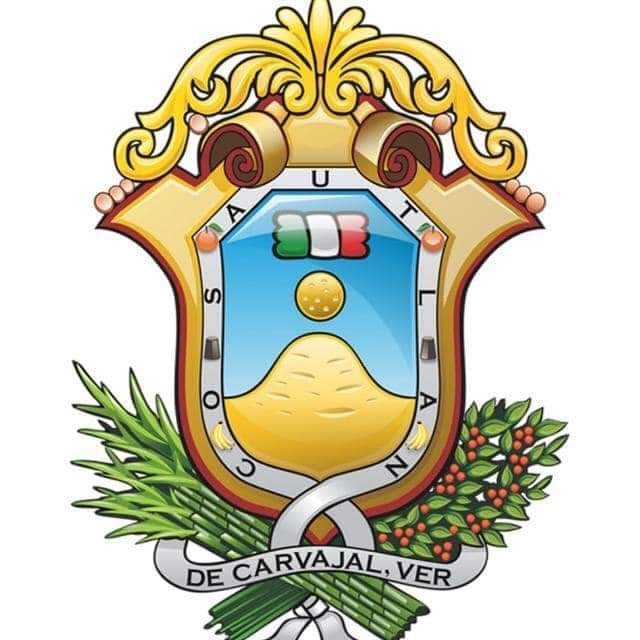
- Coat of arms

- Location in Mexico Cosautlán de Carvajal (Mexico)
- Coordinates: 19°20′00″N 96°59′00″W
- Country: Mexico
- State: Veracruz
- Region: Capital Region
- Municipal seat and largest town: Cosautlán de Carvajal

Government
  - Mayor: José Antonio Valdivia Huerta (MC)

Area
  - Total: 76.6 km^{2} (29.6 sq mi)
- Elevation (of seat): 1,172 m (3,845 ft)

Population (2020)
  - Total: 16,167
  - Density: 211.1/km^{2} (547/sq mi)
  - Seat: 4,768
- Time zone: UTC-6 (Central (US Central))
- Postal code (of seat): 91620
- Website: (in Spanish)

Historical population
Year	Pop.	±%
1995	14,268	—
2000	15,303	+7.3%
2005	14,724	−3.8%
2010	15,668	+6.4%
2015	16,353	+4.4%
2020	16,167	−1.1%

Cosautlán is a municipality in the Mexican state of Veracruz. It is located in the montane central zone of the state, about 23.5 km from Xalapa, the state capital. It has a surface of 72.38 km^{2}. It is located at 19°20′N 96°59′W. The town has 2224 men and 2393 women.

== Geography ==
The municipality of Cosautlán is delimited to the north by Teocelo, to the south by Tlaltetela, to the east by Tlaltetela, to the south by Oteapan, and to the west by Ixhuacán de los Reyes.

The weather in Cosautlán is cold all year with rains in summer and autumn.

== Demographics ==
As of 2020, the municipality had a population of 16,167inhabitants in 29 localities. About 25%, resides in the municipal seat; other localities include Limones (2,369 hab.), Piedra Parada (1,474 hab.), San Miguel Tlapéxcatl (1,098 hab.) and Emiliano Zapata (1,094 hab.).

== Economy ==
It produces principally maize and beans.

== Culture ==
In Cosautlán, in May takes place the celebration in honor to San Isidro Labrador, Patron of the town.
