= Texhuacán =

Municipality in Mexico

Texhuacán is a municipality located in the montane central zone in the Mexican state of Veracruz, about 205 km from the state capital Xalapa. It has a surface of 32.90 km^{2}. It is located at 18°37′N 97°02′W.

== Geography ==
The municipality of Texhuacán is delimited to the north by Los Reyes, to the east by Zongolica to the south by Mixtla de Altamirano, to the west by Astacinga and Tlaquilpa.

It is watered by the river Talcoco and several permanent or temporary creeks, which are tributaries of the Silly, affluent Rio of the Papaloapan.

== Agriculture ==
It produces principally maize and coffee.

== Celebrations ==
The celebration in honor of San Juan Bautista, Patron of the town, takes place in Texhuacán in June, while the celebration in honor of Virgen de Guadalupe takes place in December.
