= Ayahualulco =

- Municipality
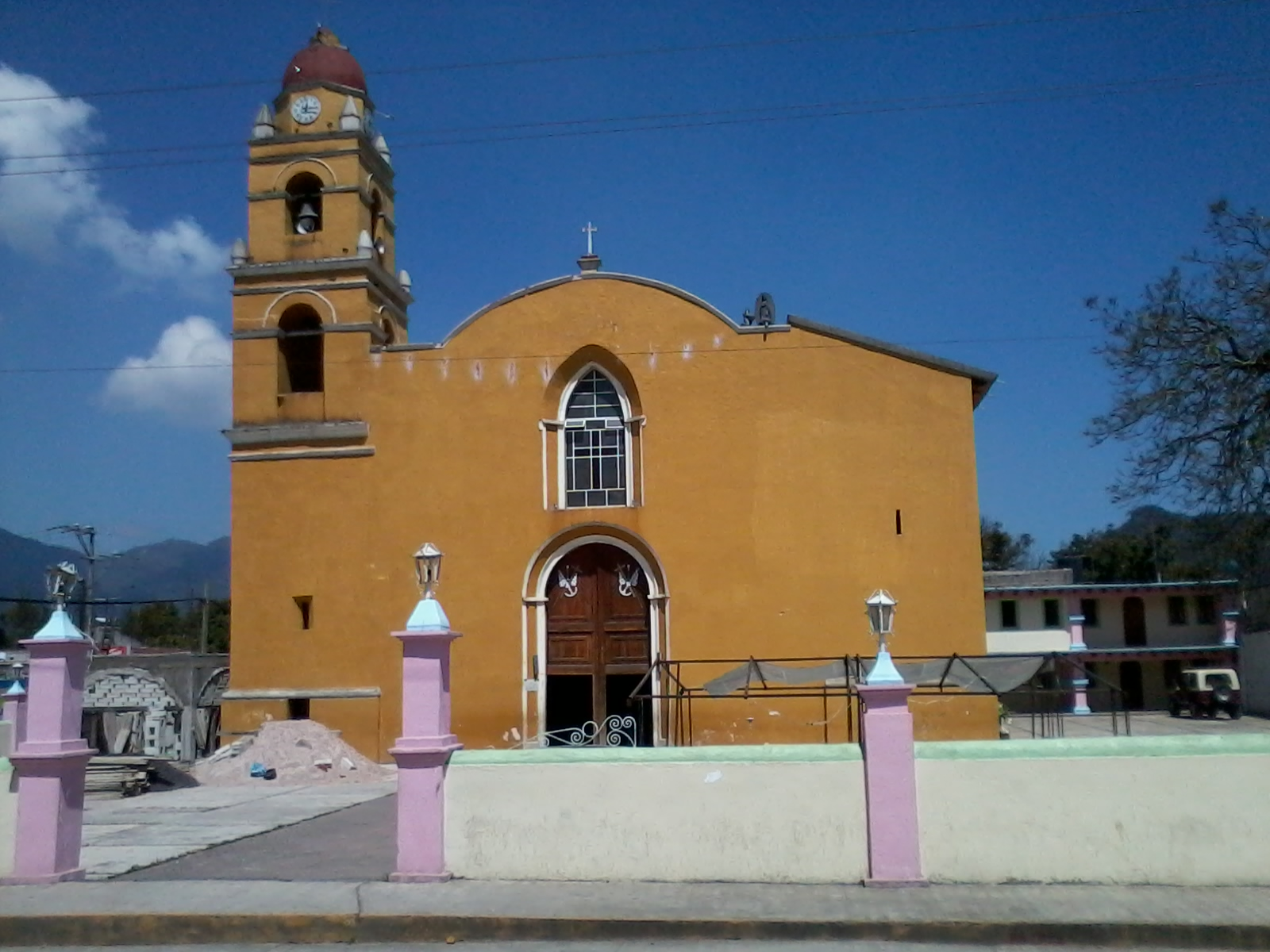
- Santiago Apóstol Church

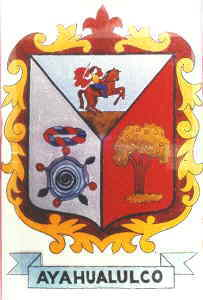
- Coat of arms

- Location in Mexico Ayahualulco (Mexico)
- Coordinates: 19°21′00″N 97°09′00″W
- Country: Mexico
- State: Veracruz
- Region: Capital Region
- Municipal seat: Ayuahualulco
- Largest town: Los Altos

Government
  - Mayor: José Arturo Morales Rosas (PRI)

Area
  - Total: 172.8 km^{2} (66.7 sq mi)
- Elevation (of seat): 2,416 m (7,927 ft)

Population (2020)
  - Total: 27,217
  - Density: 157.5/km^{2} (408/sq mi)
  - Seat: 2,823
- Time zone: UTC-6 (Central (US Central))
- Postal code (of seat): 92160
- Website: (in Spanish) https://www.ayahualulco.gob.mx/

Historical population
| Year | Pop. | ±% |
|---|---|---|
| 1995 | 20,931 | — |
| 2000 | 20,230 | −3.3% |
| 2005 | 23,431 | +15.8% |
| 2010 | 25,456 | +8.6% |
| 2015 | 26,694 | +4.9% |
| 2020 | 27,217 | +2.0% |

Ayahualulco is a municipality in the Mexican state of Veracruz.

== Geography ==
The municipality is located about 80 km from state capital Xalapa. It has a surface of 148.06 km^{2} (57.17 sq mi). It is located at 19°21′N 97°09′W.

The municipality of Ayahualulco is delimited to the north by Perote, to the north-east by Xico, to the east by Ixhuacán de los Reyes and to the south by Puebla.

== Demographics ==
As of 2020, the municipality had a population of 27,127 inhabitants in 34 localities. Ayahualulco, the municipal seat had a population of 2,823 inhabitants, other localities include Los Altos (4,556 hab.), Xololoyan (2,274 hab.), El Triunfo (2,015 hab.) and Apanteopan (1,658 hab.).

== Economy ==
It produces principally maize and potatoes.

== Culture ==
In Ayahualulco, in June takes place the celebration in honor to San Juan Bautista, Patron of the town.
