= Las Minas, Veracruz =

Las Minas
- Municipality
- Location in Mexico Las Minas (Mexico)
- Coordinates: 19°41′29″N 97°08′48″W
- Country: Mexico
- State: Veracruz
- Region: Capital Region
- Municipal seat: Las Minas
- Largest Town: Rinconada
- Established: 1 December 1868

Government
  - Mayor: Humberto Udiel Olano Carballo (MC)

Area
  - Total: 50.6 km^{2} (19.5 sq mi)
- Elevation (of seat): 1,327 m (4,354 ft)

Population (2020)
  - Total: 2,934
  - Density: 57.9/km^{2} (150/sq mi)
  - Seat: 219
- Time zone: UTC-6 (Central)
- Postal code: 93740
- Area code: 282
- Website: Official website

Las Minas (Spanish: 'the mines') is a municipality in the Mexican state of Veracruz, located 28 kilometres (17 mi) northeast of the state capital Xalapa.

== Geography ==
The municipality of Las Minas is located in central Veracruz at an altitude between 700 and 2,400 metres (2,300–7,900 ft). It borders the municipalities of Altotonga to the west and north, Tatatila to the east, Las Vigas de Ramírez to the south, and Villa Aldama to the southwest. The municipality covers an area of 51.157 square kilometres (19.752 sq mi) and comprises 0.1% of the state's area.

The land in Las Minas is mostly either forested (47%) or used as farmland (46%). The municipality is located in the Nautla River basin and the main stem of the Nautla flows through it from south to north. Known as the arroyo Borregos as it enters the municipality, it changes its name to the Trinidad River as it flows past the hydroelectric plant near the municipal seat, and then becomes the Bobos River as its course bends northwest on the municipality's border with Tatatila.

Las Minas's climate is generally temperate and humid. Average temperatures in the municipality range between 12 and 20 °C (54–68 °F), and average annual precipitation ranges between 1,100 and 1,600 millimetres (43–63 in).

Climate data for Las Minas weather station at 19°41′23″N 97°08′51″W, 1415 m above sea level (1981–2010 averages, 1951–2010 extremes)
Month	Jan	Feb	Mar	Apr	May	Jun	Jul	Aug	Sep	Oct	Nov	Dec	Year
Record high °C (°F)	32.0 (89.6)	34.0 (93.2)	35.5 (95.9)	37.5 (99.5)	39.0 (102.2)	36.0 (96.8)	30.0 (86.0)	34.5 (94.1)	32.5 (90.5)	32.5 (90.5)	32.0 (89.6)	33.5 (92.3)	39.0 (102.2)
Mean daily maximum °C (°F)	18.8 (65.8)	20.5 (68.9)	22.9 (73.2)	25.2 (77.4)	26.4 (79.5)	25.1 (77.2)	23.7 (74.7)	23.7 (74.7)	22.5 (72.5)	21.1 (70.0)	20.4 (68.7)	19.1 (66.4)	22.5 (72.5)
Daily mean °C (°F)	14.2 (57.6)	15.6 (60.1)	17.6 (63.7)	19.9 (67.8)	21.2 (70.2)	20.5 (68.9)	19.3 (66.7)	19.3 (66.7)	18.8 (65.8)	17.3 (63.1)	16.1 (61.0)	14.8 (58.6)	17.9 (64.2)
Mean daily minimum °C (°F)	9.7 (49.5)	10.6 (51.1)	12.3 (54.1)	14.5 (58.1)	16.0 (60.8)	15.8 (60.4)	14.8 (58.6)	14.9 (58.8)	15.0 (59.0)	13.4 (56.1)	11.9 (53.4)	10.6 (51.1)	13.3 (55.9)
Record low °C (°F)	−1.5 (29.3)	−0.5 (31.1)	1.0 (33.8)	6.0 (42.8)	8.0 (46.4)	6.0 (42.8)	2.0 (35.6)	4.5 (40.1)	5.5 (41.9)	4.5 (40.1)	2.5 (36.5)	−2.0 (28.4)	−2.0 (28.4)
Average precipitation mm (inches)	62.8 (2.47)	57.9 (2.28)	44.3 (1.74)	57.8 (2.28)	99.9 (3.93)	158.2 (6.23)	114.1 (4.49)	137.2 (5.40)	322.5 (12.70)	240.3 (9.46)	129.0 (5.08)	63.4 (2.50)	1,487.4 (58.56)
Average precipitation days (≥ 0.1 mm)	12.9	10.7	10.2	9.9	9.7	15.6	15.6	17.5	19.4	16.7	12.5	13.3	164.0
Source: Servicio Meteorológico National

== History ==
The original name for the area was Zomelahuacan (Nahuatl: "slippery place of elderberries"). The discovery of rich mineral deposits in the area of Zomelahuacan and Tatatila dates back to 1680 and gold and copper mining took place in the 18th and 19th centuries. In 1803 the town of Las Minas de Zomelahuacan was founded; its name was eventually shortened to Las Minas.

On 1 December 1868, Las Minas became a municipality in the canton of Jalacingo in the state of Veracruz. On 28 October 1881 it was separated from Jalacingo and attached to the canton of Xalapa. It became a free municipality on 15 January 1918.

== Administration ==
The municipal government comprises a president, a councillor (Spanish: síndico), and a trustee (regidor). The current president of the municipality is María Magdalena Hernández Condado.

== Demographics ==
Historical population
Year	Pop.	±%
1995	2,161	—
2000	2,582	+19.5%
2005	2,824	+9.4%
2010	2,897	+2.6%
2015	2,920	+0.8%
2020	2,934	+0.5%

In the 2020 INEGI census, the municipality of Las Minas recorded a population of 2,934 inhabitants living in 614 households.

There are 12 localities in the municipality, all of the classified as rural. The municipal seat, Las Minas, recorded a population of 219 inhabitants. Other localities include Rinconada (539 hab.), Molinillo (439 hab.), Landaco (348 hab.), Quiahuixcuautla (304 hab.) and Pueblo Nuevo (242 hab.).

== Economy and infrastructure ==
The main economic activity in Las Minas is farming. Corn, beans and coffee are the main crops grown, and pastures are maintained for the grazing of goats and sheep. Mineral exploration in the area is ongoing as of 2018. The Las Minas hydroelectric plant is located near the municipal seat and has a capacity of 15 MW.
