= Ixhuatlán =

Ixhuatlán may refer to:

Mexico:

- Ixhuatlán del Café, Veracruz
- Ixhuatlán del Sureste, Veracruz
- Ixhuatlán de Madero
