= Ixmatlahuacan =

Municipality in Veracruz, Mexico

- Municipality
- Location in Mexico Ixmatlahuacan (Mexico)
- Country: Mexico
- State: Veracruz
- Demonym: (in Spanish)
- Time zone: UTC−6 (CST)

Ixmatlahuacan is a municipality in the Mexican state of Veracruz. It is located in the south zone of Veracruz, about 175 km from the state capital Xalapa. It has an area of 335.59 km^{2}. It is located at 18°27′N 95°50′W.

== Geography ==
Ixmatlahuacan is delimited to the northeast by Acula, to the east by Amatitlán, to the south by Cosamaloapan, to the west by Tierra Blanca, and to the north by Ignacio de la Llave.

The weather in Ixmatlahuacan is warm year-round with rains in summer and autumn.

== Economy ==
It produces principally maize, beans, rice, sugarcane, watermelon and mango.

== Culture ==
In May, Ixmatlahuacan celebrates the Ascención del Señor, patron of the town.
