= Oluta =

Municipality in the Mexican state of Veracruz

- City and municipality
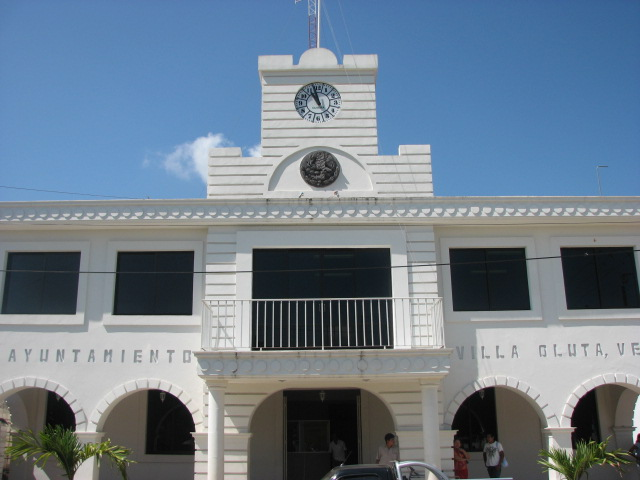
- Municipal palace of Oluta

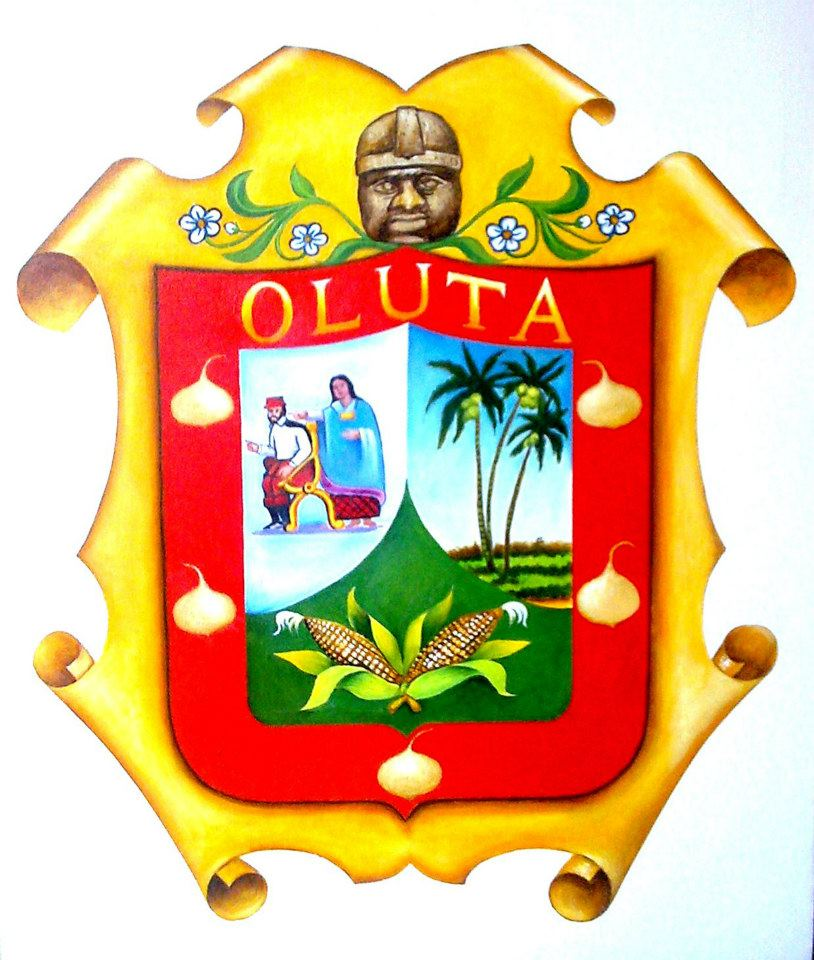
- Coat of arms

- Location in Veracruz Oluta (Mexico)
- Coordinates: 17°56′N 94°54′W
- Country: Mexico
- State: Veracruz
- Region: Olmeca Region

Area
  - Total: 90 km^{2} (35 sq mi)

Population (2020)
  - Total: 17,027
  - Seat: 12,709

Oluta is a city and municipality in the Mexican state of Veracruz. It is located in the south-east zone of the state, about 371 km from the state capital Xalapa. It has a surface of 90.48 km^{2}. It is located at 17°56′N 94°54′W.

== Geography ==
The municipality of Oluta is delimited to the north by Acayucan and Soconusco to the east by Texistepec, to the south-west by Sayula de Alemán and to the west by Acayucan.

== Economy ==
It produces principally maize, rice, orange fruit, coffee and mango.

== Culture ==
A celebration in honor of San Juan Bautista, the town's Patron Saint, takes place every June 24th.
