= Aquila, Veracruz =

Municipality in Veracruz, Mexico

Aquila
- Municipality
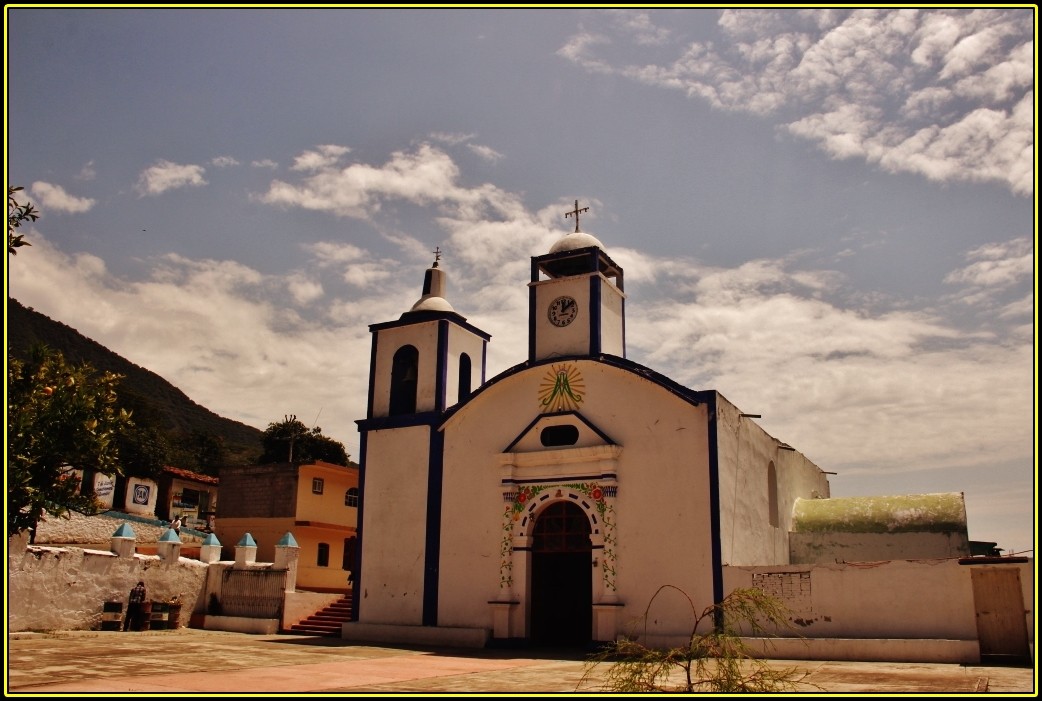

- Location in Mexico Aquila (Mexico)
- Country: Mexico
- State: Veracruz
- Demonym: (in Spanish)
- Time zone: UTC−6 (CST)

Aquila is a municipality in the Mexican state of Veracruz. It is located about 136 km from state capital Xalapa to the south-west. It has a surface of 35.37 km^{2}. It is located at 18°48′N 97°18′W.

== Geography ==
The municipality of Aquila is delimited to the north by the state of Puebla, to the east by Maltrata, to the south by Acultzingo and to the west by Puebla.

== Products ==
It produces maize.
