= Tehuipango =

Municipality in the Mexican state of Veracruz

- Municipality
- Location in Mexico Tehuipango (Mexico)
- Country: Mexico
- State: Veracruz
- Demonym: (in Spanish)
- Time zone: UTC−6 (CST)

Tehuipango is a municipality located in the montane central zone in the Mexican state of Veracruz, about 110 km from the state capital Xalapa. It has a surface of 111.04 km^{2}. It is located at 18°31′N 97°03′W. Santiago Tehuipango, it was a people belonging to Zongolica's federation, during the 16th century, later it tried to form its own town hall; in 1831 a municipality was consisting already of basics schools and parish of masonry. It was bordering on Mixtla, Eloxitlan, Alcomunga, Astacinga and Texhuacán.

== Geography ==
The municipality of Tehuipango is delimited to the north by Astacinga, Mixtla de Altamirano and Zongolica and to the south by Puebla State. It is watered by the Rio Moyoteampa that is a tributary of the affluent Idiot of the river Papaloapan.

== Agriculture ==
It produces principally maize, plum, apple, pea and faba bean.

== Celebrations ==
In Tehuipango, the celebration in honor to Santiago Apostol, Patron of the town, takes place in July, and the celebration in honor to Virgen de Guadalupe takes place in December.
