= Mixtla de Altamirano =

- City and municipality
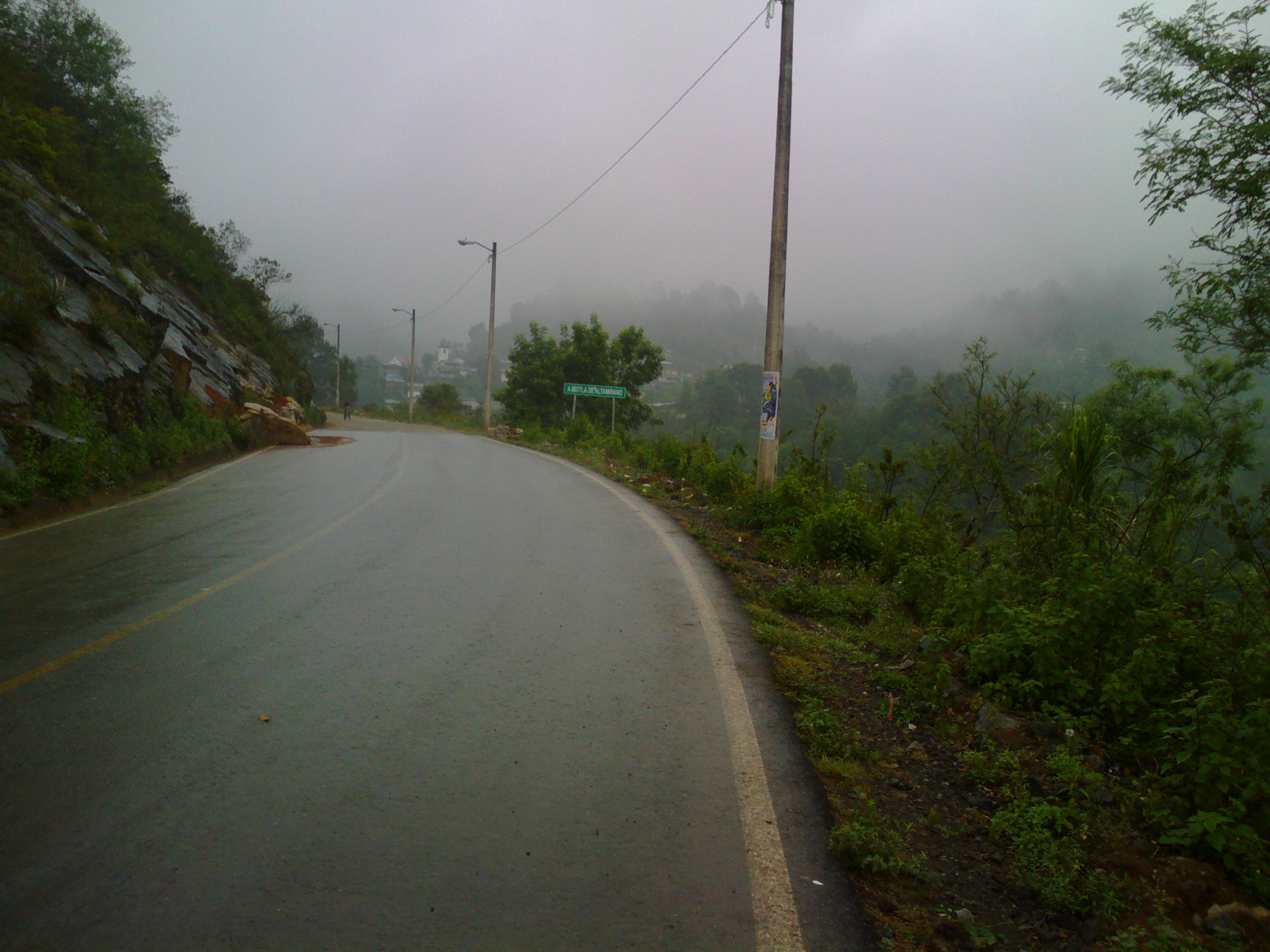
- Una carretera en un día nublado

- Location in Veracruz Mixtla de Altamirano (Mexico)
- Coordinates: 18°55′N 97°08′W
- Country: Mexico
- State: Veracruz

Population (2020)
  - Total: 10,387
  - Seat: 405
- Time zone: UTC-6 (Central Standard Time)

Mixtla de Altamirano is a municipality in the Mexican state of Veracruz. It is in the central zone of the state, about 247 kilometres (153 mi) from the state capital Xalapa. It has an area of 60.87 square kilometres (23.50 sq mi).

== Geography ==
The municipality of Mixtla de Altamirano is delimited to the north by Texhuacán, to the east by Zongolica, to the south by Tehuipango and to the west by Astacinga.

The weather in Mixtla de Altamirano is very cold all year with rains in summer and autumn.

== Economy ==
It produces principally maize and coffee.

== Culture ==
In Mixtla de Altamirano, a celebration to honor San Andrés Apostol, patron of the town, takes place in December.
