= Zaragoza, Veracruz =

Zaragoza
- Municipality
- Location in Mexico
- Coordinates: 17°57′11″N 94°38′29″W
- Country: Mexico
- State: Veracruz
- Established: 1 December 1868
- Seat: Zaragoza

Government
  - Municipal president: Miguel Ángel Grajales Mateo

Area
  - Total: 21.767 km^{2} (8.404 sq mi)
- Elevation (of seat): 19 m (62 ft)

Population (2010 Census)
  - Total: 10,720
  - Estimate (2015 Intercensal Survey): 11,354
  - Density: 492.5/km^{2} (1,276/sq mi)
  - Seat: 9,639
- Time zone: UTC-6 (Central)
- Postal codes: 96320–96324
- Area code: 922
- Website: Official website

Zaragoza is a municipality in the Mexican state of Veracruz, located 297 kilometres (185 mi) southeast of the state capital of Xalapa and 10 kilometres (6.2 mi) southwest of the city of Minatitlán.

== Geography ==
The municipality of Zaragoza is located on the coastal plain of southern Veracruz. It borders the municipalities of Cosoleacaque to the east and south, Jáltipan to the west, and Oteapan to the northwest. The municipality covers an area of 264.418 square kilometres (102.092 sq mi) and comprises 0.03% of the state's area.

Zaragoza's terrain is flat and is composed of pastureland (51%), farmland (36%) and built-up areas (14%). It is located in the Coatzacoalcos River basin.

Zaragoza's climate is humid with rain throughout the year. Average temperatures in the municipality range between 24 and 26 °C (75–79 °F), and average annual precipitation ranges between 1,900 and 2,100 millimetres (75–83 in).

== History ==
It is conjectured that a group of Popoluca settlers from Oteapan founded a settlement in this location in the early 19th century, which was then called San Isidro Xumuapan. Zaragoza was incorporated on 1 December 1868 as a municipality in the canton of Minatitlán in the state of Veracruz. It became a free municipality on 15 January 1918.

== Administration ==
The municipal government comprises a president, a councillor (Spanish: síndico), and a trustee (regidor). The current president of the municipality is Miguel Ángel Grajales Mateo.

== Demographics ==
In the 2010 census, the municipality of Zaragoza recorded a population of 10,720 inhabitants living in 2393 households. The 2015 Intercensal Survey estimated a population of 11,354 inhabitants in Zaragoza, of whom 93.58% reported being of indigenous ancestry and 11.45% reported being of African ancestry. In the 2010 Census, 3401 people or 32% of the population in Tepetzintla reported speaking an indigenous language, of which 3341 spoke Nahuatl.

There are 18 localities in the municipality, of which only the municipal seat, also known as Zaragoza, is classified as urban. It recorded a population of 9639 inhabitants in the 2010 Census. In the 2020 census, the municipiality of Zaragoza recorded a population of 11,899 inhabitants, of whom 52.63% are female, and 47.37% are male.

== Economy ==
Many of Zaragoza's inhabitants work in nearby cities such as Minatitlán, Jáltipan or Cosoleacaque, either in the service industry or for Pemex-related companies. The farming of pigs and cattle also contributes to the local economy.
