= Magdalena Municipality =

Magdalena Municipality may refer to:

- Magdalena Municipality, Beni, Bolivia
- Magdalena Municipality, Jalisco, Mexico
- Magdalena Municipality, Veracruz, Mexico
- Magdalena de Kino Municipality, Sonora, Mexico
