= Soconusco, Veracruz =

Municipality in Veracruz State, Mexico

Soconusco
- Municipality
- Coat of arms

- Location in Mexico Soconusco (Mexico)
- Country: Mexico
- State: Veracruz
- Demonym: (in Spanish)
- Time zone: UTC−6 (CST)

Soconusco is a municipality in the Mexican state of Veracruz, about 275 kilometres (171 mi) from the state capital Xalapa. It has an area of 94.59 square kilometres (36.52 mi^{2}). It is located at 17°58′N 94°53′W.

== Geography ==
The municipality of Soconusco is delimited to the north by Soteapan and Chinameca, to the east by Jaltipan de Morelos, to the south by Texistepec and Oluta and to the west by Acayucan. It is watered by a creek and tributary creeks of the Chacalapa river, tributary of the Coatzacoalcos river.

The weather in Soconusco is warm and wet all year with rains in summer and autumn.

== Agriculture ==
It produces principally maize, beans, rice and orange fruit.

== Celebrations ==
Every May in Soconusco there is a celebration in honor of Virgen de la Concepción, and in June there´s a celebration in honor of San Antonio de Padua and in July the biggest celebration is in honor of Santa Ana de mother of the virgin Mary does are the Patrons of the town, in April the 26 there´s a celebration almost like a tradition of choosing the pretties Young Lady of town a couple of them around five choose to participate in the contest to win the crown this is for La Reyna de La Sal (Queen of Pink Salt) and a couple of young males participate in the contest too for one of them to be the Ugly King (El Rey Feo) this all belongs to a tradition in the way of a small town in the outsides of Soconusco. Benito Juarez is a small town with a salt water well, the water from which is boiled to produce Pink Salt, which is rich in sodium and helps to prevent diabetes and other issues. In December there is a celebration in honor of Virgen de Guadalupe.
