= Villa Aldama =

- Municipality and town
- Coat of arms

- Location in Mexico
- Coordinates: 19°39′N 97°14′W
- Country: Mexico
- State: Veracruz

Area
  - Total: 78.96 km^{2} (30.49 sq mi)

Population (2005)
  - Total: 9,573
- Time zone: UTC-6 (Central Standard Time)

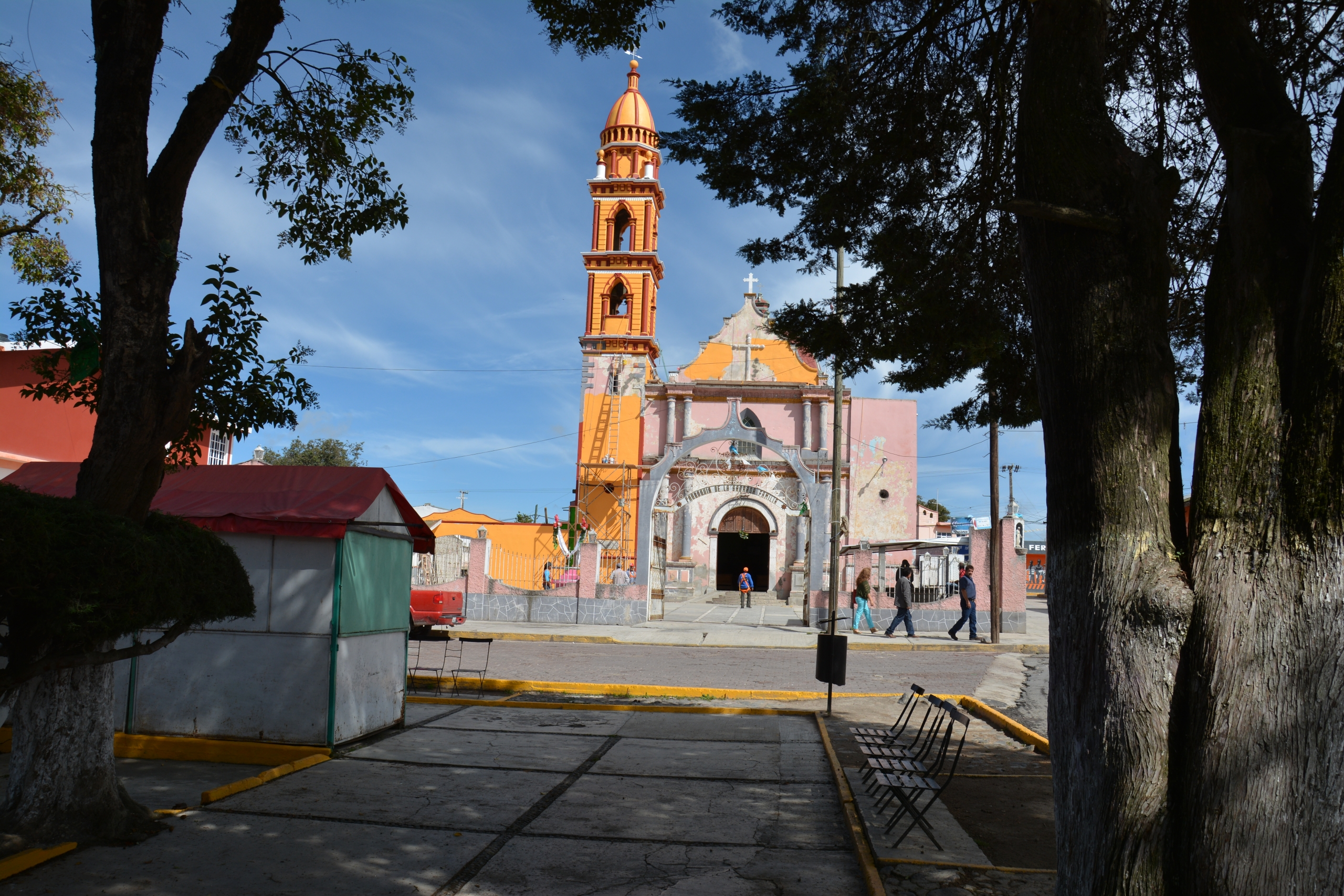
Sagrada Familia Church in Villa Aldama, Veracruz, Mexico.

Villa Aldama is a municipality located in the central zone in the Mexican state of Veracruz, about 33 km from the state capital Xalapa. It has a surface of 78.96 km^{2}. It is located at 19°39′N 97°14′W. The municipality takes this name in honor of Don Juan Aldama, who was one of the revolutionary commanders in the Mexican War of Independence.

== Geography ==
The municipality of Villa Aldama is bordered to the north by Las Minas and Altotonga, to the east by Las Vigas and to the south by Perote.

The weather in Villa Aldama is cold and wet all year with rains in summer and autumn.

== Agriculture ==
It produces principally maize, beans and potatoes.

== Celebrations ==
Every July, a festival is held to celebrate Saint John the Apostle, patron of the town, and in December there is a festival held in honor of the Virgin of Guadalupe.
