= Oteapan =

Municipality in the Mexican state of Veracruz

- Municipality
- Location in Mexico Oteapan (Mexico)
- Country: Mexico
- State: Veracruz
- Demonym: (in Spanish)
- Time zone: UTC−6 (CST)

Oteapan is a municipality in the Mexican state of Veracruz. It is in the south-east zone of the state, about 394 km from the state capital Xalapa. It has an area of 27.97 km^{2}. It is located at 18°00′N 94°40′W.

== Geography ==
The municipality of Oteapan is delimited to the north by Chinameca to the east by Cosoleacaque, to the south by Zaragoza and to the south-west by Jaltipan State. The weather in Oteapan is warm all year with rains in summer and autumn.

== Products ==
It produces principally maize, rice and green chile.

== Culture ==
In Oteapan, in May takes place the celebration in honor to Santa Cecilia, patron of the town.
