= Tlalnelhuayocan =

- Locality
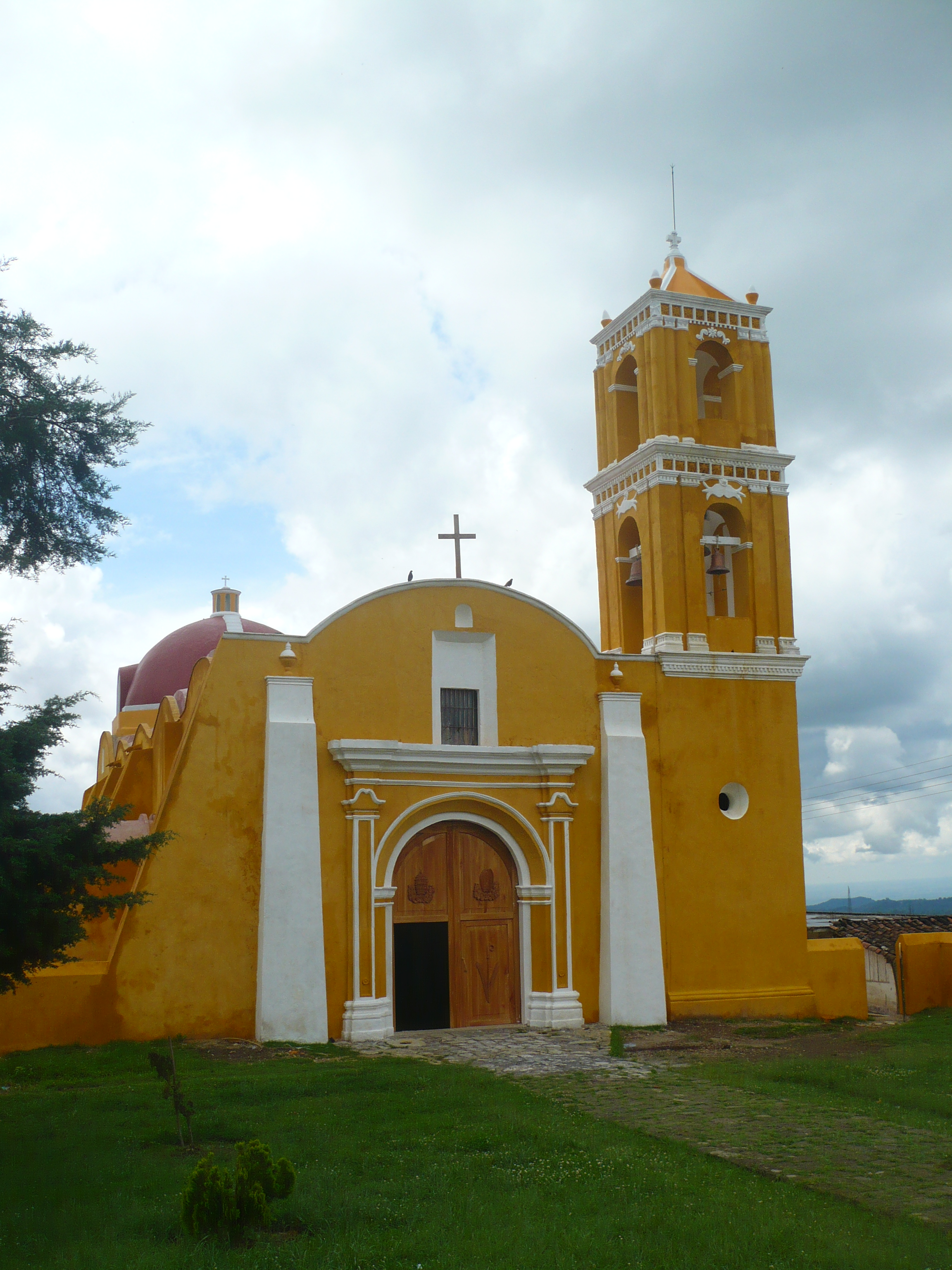
- Iglesia San Andrés Tlalnelhuayocan

- Location within Veracruz Location within Mexico
- Coordinates: 19°33′52″N 96°58′26″W
- Country: Mexico
- State: Veracruz
- Municipality: Tlalnelhuayocan
- Elevation: 1,619 m (5,312 ft)

Population (2020)
  - Total: 1,129
- Time zone: UTC-6 (Central)

Tlalnelhuayocan is a municipality in the Mexican state of Veracruz, located 2 kilometres from the state capital Xalapa. It stands on the Mexico City–Veracruz railway and on Federal Highways 180 and 125. Its name was San Andrés Tlalnelhuayocan, who is the first name was used to the Nahuatl and the people of Jilotepec. Tlalnelhuayocan is formed by various localities, being, San Andres, Otilpan, Palenquillo, San Antonio, Xocotla and Xolostla the most known of them.

== Vegetation ==
There are reported more than 123 species, of which 95 are epiphytes. These numbers represents the 24% of the epiphyitic flora of central Veracruz.
