= Astacinga =

Municipality of Mexico

- Municipality
- Location in Mexico Astacinga (Mexico)
- Country: Mexico
- State: Veracruz
- Demonym: (in Spanish)
- Time zone: UTC−6 (CST)

Astacinga is a municipality in the Mexican state of Veracruz. It is located about 213 km from state capital Xalapa to the south. It has a surface of 69.09 km^{2}. It is located at 18°34′N 97°06′W.

== Geography ==
The municipality of Astacinga is delimited to the north by Tlaquilpa, to the north-east by Mixtla de Altamirano, to the south-east by Tehuipango and to the west by Puebla.

In Astacinga the ecosystems that coexist in the municipality are the one of cold forest with species like the pine.

== Products ==
It produces maize and beans.
