= Tlaquilpa =

Municipality in the Mexican state of Veracruz

- Municipality
- Location in Mexico Tlaquilpa (Mexico)
- Country: Mexico
- State: Veracruz
- Demonym: (in Spanish)
- Time zone: UTC−6 (CST)

Tlaquilpa is a municipality located in the south zone in the Mexican state of Veracruz, about 105 km from the state capital of Xalapa. It has a surface of 58.40 km^{2}. It is located at 18°36′N 97°07′W. The name comes from Náhuatl, and means "bricklayers' place". Tlaquilpa is a very ancient village, which existed before the Spanish conquest. In the 16th century, it came under Zongolica's jurisdiction, with the name of Santa Maria Magdalena. In 1831 it was constituted as a municipality. Tlaquilpa borders on Mixtla de Altamirano, Astacinga and Texhuacán.

== Geography ==
The municipality of Tlaquilpa is delimited to the north by Xoxocotla and Atlahuilco, to the east by Los Reyes, to the south by Astacinga, and to the west by Vicente Guerrero in the state of Puebla. The municipality is watered by different creeks and springs taking the names of the localities where they are situated.

The weather in Tlaquilpa is very warm and wet all year with rains in summer and autumn.

== Agriculture ==
Maize, beans and rice are the principal agricultural products.

From July 21 to 22, a celebration in honor of Santa María Magdalena, patroness of the town, takes place. On 12 December there is the celebration in honor of the Virgin of Guadalupe.
