= Ixhuatlán del Café =

- City and municipal seat
- Location in Veracruz
- Country: Mexico
- State: Veracruz
- Region: Mountains Region

Area
  - Total: 132 km^{2} (51 sq mi)

Population (2020)
  - Total: 23,232
  - Seat: 6,946

Ixhuatlán del Café is a city in the Mexican state of Veracruz. It serves as the municipal seat of the municipality of the same name.

The municipality covers a total surface area of 134.07 km^{2} and, in the 2020 census, reported a population of 23,232. It is located at 19°03′N 96°59′W.

Its chief products are corn, coffee and fruits.
