= Ixhuacán =

Ixhuacán de los Reyes
- Municipality
- Location in Mexico Ixhuacán de los Reyes (Mexico)
- Coordinates: 19°21′22″N 97°07′01″W
- Country: Mexico
- State: Veracruz
- Region: Capital Region
- Municipal seat and largest town: Ixhuacán de los Reyes

Government
  - Municipal President: Fortunato Ruiz Vargas (PRI)

Area
  - Total: 149.8 km^{2} (57.8 sq mi)
- Elevation (of seat): 1,754 m (5,755 ft)

Population (2020)
  - Total: 11,387
  - Density: 76/km^{2} (200/sq mi)
  - Seat: 2,692
- Time zone: UTC-6 (Central (US Central))
- Postal code (of seat): 91250
- Website: (in Spanish)

Historical population
Year	Pop.	±%
1995	9,104	—
2000	9,517	+4.5%
2005	9,933	+4.4%
2010	10,724	+8.0%
2015	11,442	+6.7%
2020	11,387	−0.5%

Ixhuacán, or Ixhuacán de los Reyes, is a city in the Mexican state of Veracruz. It is located approximately 36 km (22 mi) from Xalapa Enríquez; Federal Highway 123 runs through it. It is bordered by Teocelo, Xico and Coatepec. Coffee is the chief product of Ixhuacán de los Reyes.

It serves as the municipal seat for the surrounding municipality of the same name.

== History ==
In August 1519 Hernán Cortés passed through Ixhuacán on his way to Tenochtitlan. Both Cortes and his chronicler Francisco Lopez de Gomara described the town as having a fort.

== Climate ==
Ixhuacán de los Reyes has a subtropical highland climate (Cfb) with cool to mild weather year-round. It experiences heavy monsoonal precipitation from June to September.

Climate data for Ixhuacán de los Reyes
Month	Jan	Feb	Mar	Apr	May	Jun	Jul	Aug	Sep	Oct	Nov	Dec	Year
Mean daily maximum °C (°F)	17.6 (63.7)	19.1 (66.4)	21.4 (70.5)	23.1 (73.6)	23.9 (75.0)	22.7 (72.9)	22.3 (72.1)	22.8 (73.0)	22.3 (72.1)	21.5 (70.7)	19.9 (67.8)	18.9 (66.0)	21.3 (70.3)
Daily mean °C (°F)	12.1 (53.8)	13.3 (55.9)	15.2 (59.4)	16.9 (62.4)	17.6 (63.7)	16.7 (62.1)	16.3 (61.3)	16.8 (62.2)	16.5 (61.7)	15.7 (60.3)	14.1 (57.4)	13.1 (55.6)	15.4 (59.7)
Mean daily minimum °C (°F)	6.6 (43.9)	7.5 (45.5)	9.0 (48.2)	10.7 (51.3)	11.3 (52.3)	10.6 (51.1)	10.3 (50.5)	10.8 (51.4)	10.7 (51.3)	9.8 (49.6)	8.3 (46.9)	7.4 (45.3)	9.4 (48.9)
Average rainfall mm (inches)	60.3 (2.37)	55.4 (2.18)	54.6 (2.15)	82.9 (3.26)	149.5 (5.89)	507.6 (19.98)	530.0 (20.87)	514.4 (20.25)	514.5 (20.26)	248.4 (9.78)	109.5 (4.31)	78.8 (3.10)	2,905.9 (114.4)
Average rainy days	8.7	8.0	7.5	8.4	11.0	20.9	23.6	23.4	23.2	16.9	10.5	9.2	171.3
Source: SERVICIO METEOROLÓGICO NACIONAL

== Demographics ==
As of 2020, the municipality had a population of 11,387 inhabitants in 141 localities. About 20% resides in the municipal seat (2,692 hab.). Other localities includes Monte Grande (926 hab.), Barranca Nueva (808 hab.), Tlalchy (625 hab.) and Caltzontepec (554 hab.).
