= Las Vigas de Ramírez =

City in Veracruz, Mexico

- Municipality
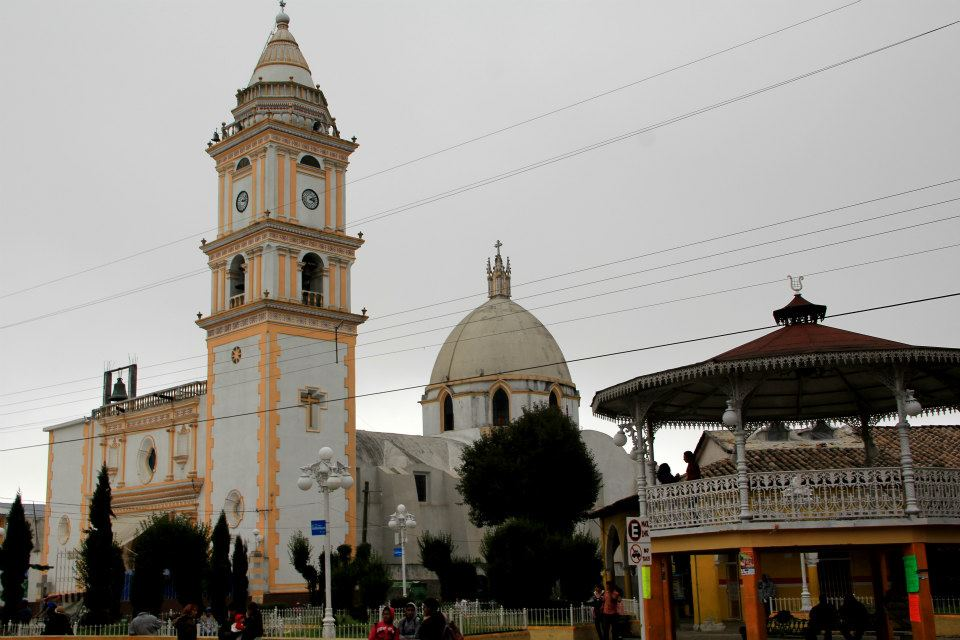
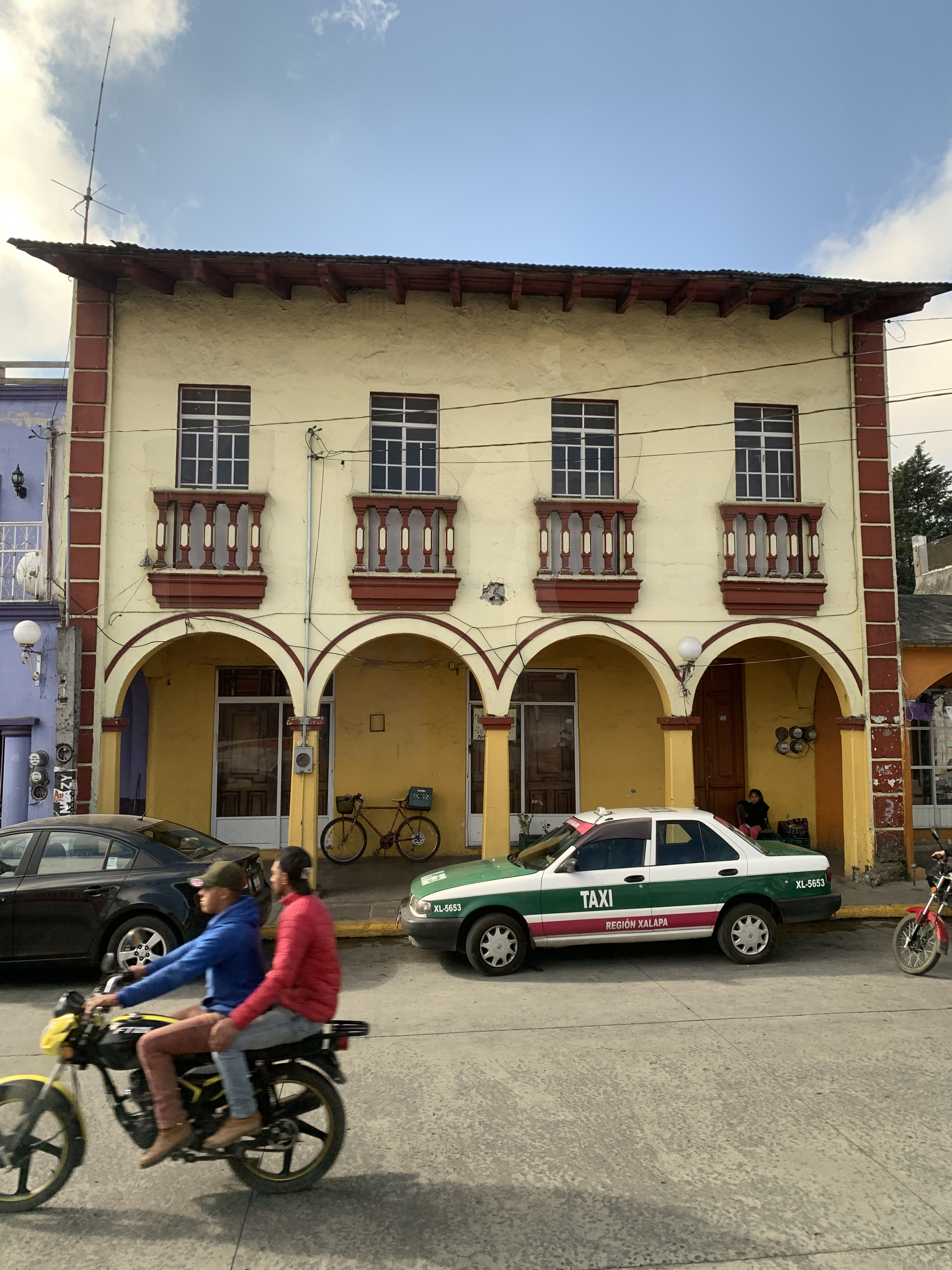
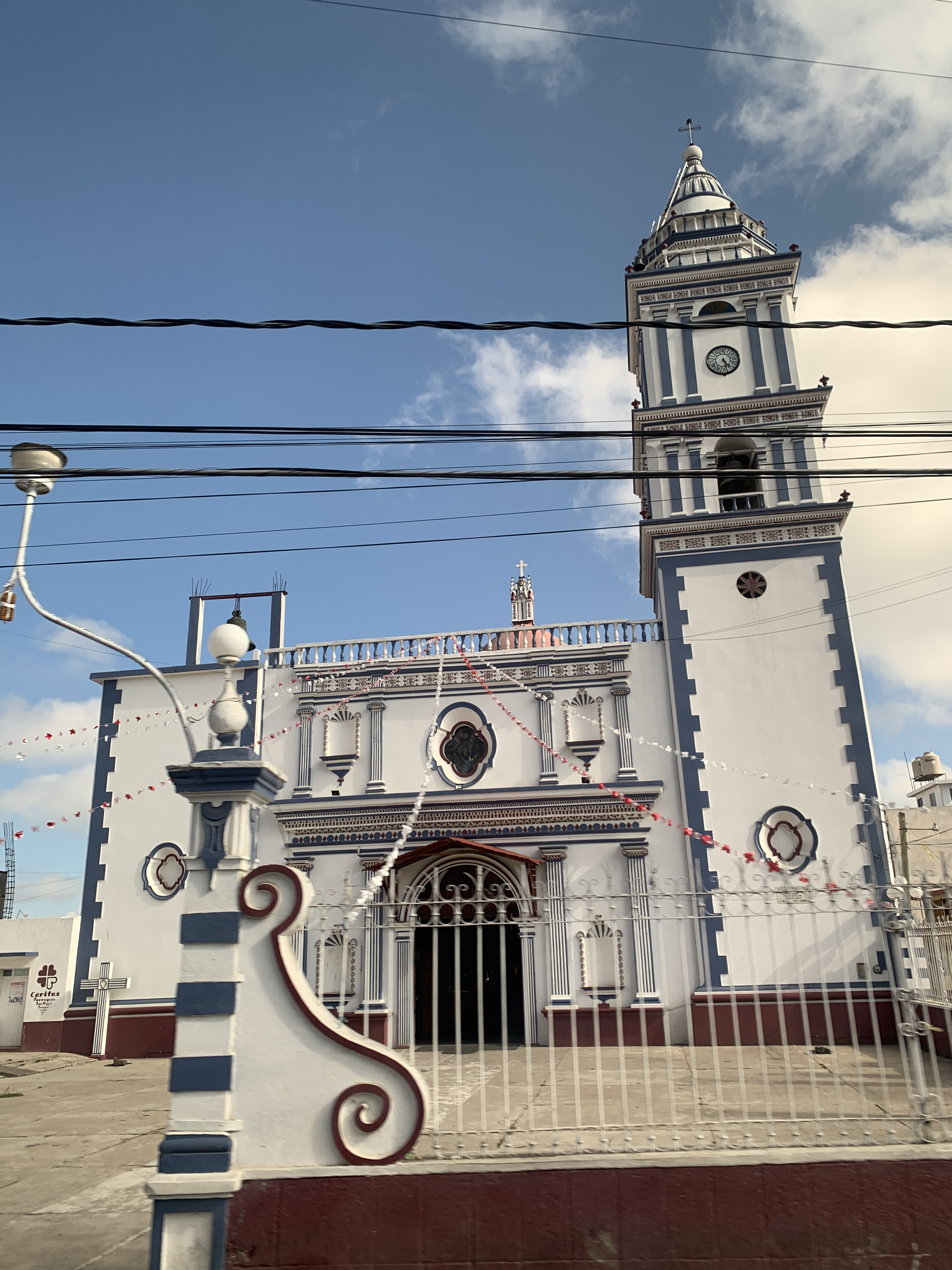
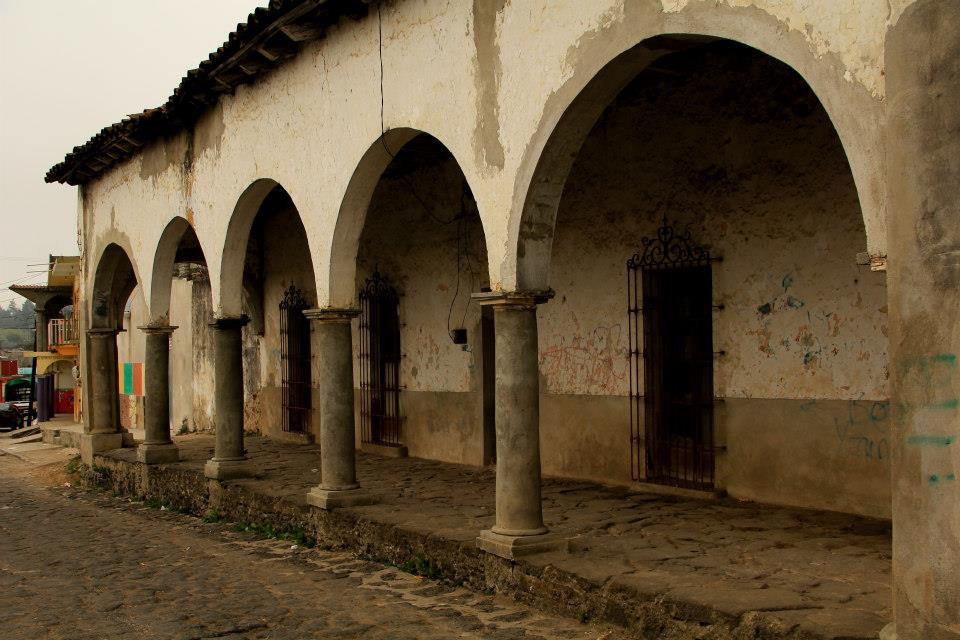
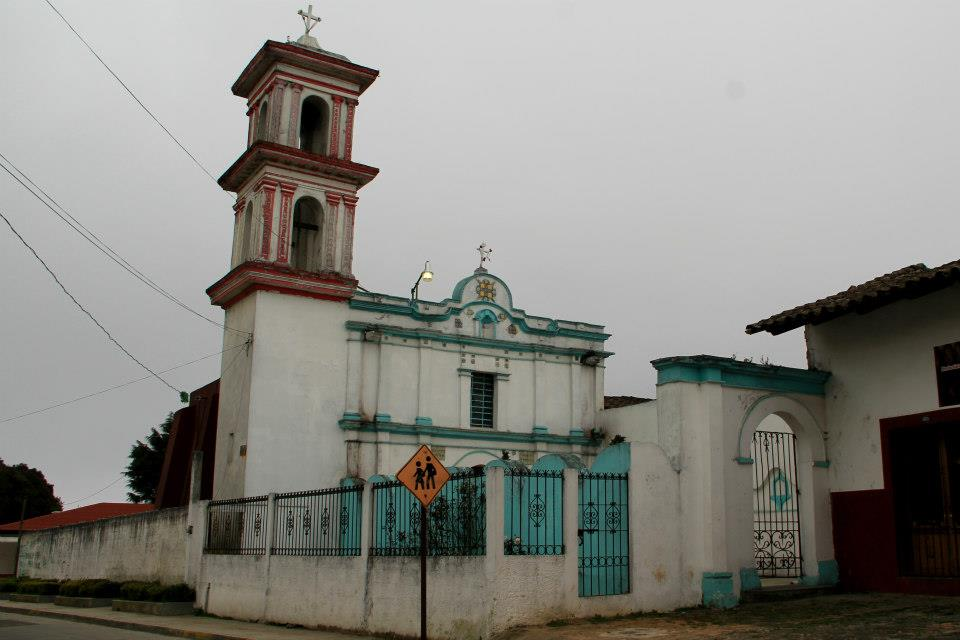
- Top: Las Vigas main plaza; Middle: Las Vigas de Ramírez Downtown, San Miguel Parish; Bottom: Old Buildings at Las Vigas de Ramírez, Our Lady of Dolores Church

- Location in Mexico Las Vigas de Ramírez (Mexico)
- Coordinates: 19°38′13″N 97°06′00″W
- Country: Mexico
- State: Veracruz
- Region: Capital Region
- Municipal seat and largest town: Las Vigas de Ramírez

Government
  - Municipal President: José de Jesús Landa Hernández (Unidad Ciudadana)

Area
  - Total: 99.7 km^{2} (38.5 sq mi)
- Elevation (of seat): 2,500 m (8,200 ft)

Population (2020)
  - Total: 20,300
  - Density: 203.7/km^{2} (528/sq mi)
  - Seat: 9,924
- Time zone: UTC-6 (Central (US Central))
- Postal code (of seat): 91330-91336
- Website: http://www.lasvigas.gob.mx/

Las Vigas de Ramírez is a city in the Mexican state of Veracruz. It serves as the municipal seat for the surrounding municipality of the same name. The city was established by decree on 23 November 1523, named after the teacher Rafael Ramírez Castañeda (1884–1959).

== Geography ==
It is located 40 km from the state capital, Xalapa; it stands on the Mexico City to Veracruz railway and on Federal Highways 180 and 122.

== Demographics ==
Historical population
Year	Pop.	±%
1995	13,535	—
2000	14,161	+4.6%
2005	15,036	+6.2%
2010	17,958	+19.4%
2015	19,725	+9.8%
2020	20,300	+2.9%

As of 2020, the municipality had a population of 20,300 inhabitants in 47 localities. Las Vigas de Ramírez, the municipal seat, it's the only considered urban with a population of 9,924 inhabitants. Other localities include Barrio de San Miguel (1,762 hab.), El Paisano (1,114 hab.), El Llanillo Redondo (1,113 hab.) and Toxtlacuaya (657 hab.).

== Economy ==
Major agricultural products include corn, coffee, fruits, and rice.
