= Papaloapan Region (Veracruz) =

Papaloapan Region Región del Papaloapan
- Region
- Papaloapan Region in the state of Veracruz
- Country: Mexico
- State: Veracruz
- Largest city: Tierra Blanca
- Named for: Papaloapan River
- Municipalities: 22: Acula; Alvarado; Amatitlán; Ángel R. Cabada; Carlos A. Carrillo; Chacaltianguis; Cosamaloapan de Carpio; Ignacio de la Llave; Isla; Ixmatlahuacan; José Azueta; Juan Rodríguez Clara; Lerdo de Tejada; Otatitlán; Playa Vicente; Saltabarranca; Santiago Sochiapan; Tierra Blanca; Tlacojalpan; Tlacotalpan; Tres Valles; Tuxtilla

Area (Note: Although public, some statistical information about Veracruz provided on the INEGI's website may not be conspicuously displayed and additional steps (query the database, download files) may be required to access it.)
  - Total: 10,477.02 km^{2} (4,045.20 sq mi)
  - Rank: 3rd
- Lowest elevation (Gulf of Mexico): 0 m (0 ft)

Population (2020)
  - Total: 563,063
  - Rank: 7th
  - Density: 53.7427/km^{2} (139.193/sq mi)
- Time zone: UTC−6 (CST)

Papaloapan Region is one of the regions of Veracruz, Mexico.

== Geography ==
Papaloapan Region occupies a portion of the southern Gulf Coastal Plain, in the lower basins of the Papaloapan and Blanco rivers.

It is bounded on the north by the Gulf of Mexico, on the northwest by Sotavento Region, on the west by Mountains Region, on the south by the state of Oaxaca, on the east by Olmeca and Los Tuxtlas regions.

== Municipalities ==
The Papaloapan region is conformed by the following 22 municipalities.

Municipality code	Name	Population		Land Area			Population density	
Municipality code	Name	2020	Rank	km^{2}	sq mi	Rank	2020	Rank
005	Acula	5,253	20	195.02	75.30	16	27/km^{2} (70/sq mi)	20
011	Alvarado	57,035	2	826.93	319.28	5	69/km^{2} (179/sq mi)	7
012	Amatitlán	7,866	16	135.07	52.15	17	58/km^{2} (151/sq mi)	9
015	Ángel R. Cabada	33,839	8	430.55	166.24	10	79/km^{2} (204/sq mi)	6
045	Cosamaloapan de Carpio	54,737	3	519.13	200.44	9	105/km^{2} (273/sq mi)	3
054	Chacaltianguis	11,461	15	290.46	112.15	14	39/km^{2} (102/sq mi)	16
075	Ignacio de la Llave	16,525	12	396.92	153.25	12	42/km^{2} (108/sq mi)	14
077	Isla	42,807	5	926.87	357.87	4	46/km^{2} (120/sq mi)	11
084	Ixmatlahuacan	5,574	19	347.25	134.07	13	16/km^{2} (42/sq mi)	22
094	Juan Rodríguez Clara	38,367	7	992.11	383.06	3	39/km^{2} (100/sq mi)	17
119	Otatitlán	5,651	18	49.84	19.24	22	113/km^{2} (294/sq mi)	2
130	Playa Vicente	39,327	6	1,192.74	460.52	2	33/km^{2} (85/sq mi)	18
139	Saltabarranca	6,126	17	108.49	41.89	18	56/km^{2} (146/sq mi)	10
169	José Azueta	22,709	10	535.49	206.75	8	42/km^{2} (110/sq mi)	13
174	Tierra Blanca	95,602	1	1,517.86	586.05	1	63/km^{2} (163/sq mi)	8
176	Tlacojalpan	4,489	21	102.72	39.66	19	44/km^{2} (113/sq mi)	12
178	Tlacotalpan	12,898	14	578.54	223.38	6	22/km^{2} (58/sq mi)	21
190	Tuxtilla	2,258	22	56.12	21.67	21	40/km^{2} (104/sq mi)	15
207	Tres Valles	44,978	4	547.66	211.45	7	82/km^{2} (213/sq mi)	5
208	Carlos A. Carrillo	23,376	9	244.16	94.27	15	96/km^{2} (248/sq mi)	4
212	Santiago Sochiapan	13,062	13	399.12	154.10	11	33/km^{2} (85/sq mi)	19
	Papaloapan Region	563,063	—	10,477.02	4,045.20	—	54/km^{2} (139/sq mi)	—
Source: INEGI

=== Largest cities ===
Largest cities or towns in Papaloapan Region Source:
Rank		Municipality	Pop.
1	Tierra Blanca	Tierra Blanca	47,035
2	Cosamaloapan	Cosamaloapan de Carpio	29,081
3	Isla	Isla	25,608
4	Alvarado	Alvarado	20,797
5	Carlos A. Carrillo	Carlos A. Carrillo	17,919
6	Tres Valles	Tres Valles	16,758
7	Juan Rodríguez Clara	Juan Rodríguez Clara	15,512
8	Ángel R. Cabada	Ángel R. Cabada	13,225
9	Playa Vicente	Playa Vicente	8,969
10	Tlacotalpan	Tlacotalpan	7,287
