= Guaspaltepec =

Prehispanic settlement in Mexico

Guaspaltepec was a conquest-era prehispanic settlement located in the municipality of Playa Vicente in the Mexican state of Veracruz. It was the capital of a prehispanic state, and later a colonial corregimiento, and was abandoned around 1600 CE. The name continued to be used for a corregimiento and later an Alcaldía mayor until the beginning of the 18th century.

== Etymology ==
Guaspaltepec is a Nahuatl placename, probably meaning "hill of lizards".

This name has been spelled many ways over time. Some of the most common variations include Guaspaltepec, Guaspaltepeque, Huaspaltepec, Huaxpala, Acuazpaltepec, Cuauhcuetzpaltepec. All of these variations have been used in publications, and sometimes multiple have even been used in the same document. The correct Nahuatl form has not been determined for certain, but it may have been Cuauhcuetzpaltepec.

== Location ==
The precise location of Guaspaltepec has been lost to time. One theory says that it was located at what is now the rancho of Huaxpala, located approximately two kilometers west of the town of Playa Vicente. However, the Archivo General de la Nación contains a map from 1791 depicting the former town of Guaspaltepec on the other side of the river, specifically at an intermediate point, not exactly defined, between Las Cruces, El Mirador and Playa Vicente.

== Ethnolinguistic composition ==
The wider territory ruled by Guaspaltepec had a multiethnic population, consisting of Popolucas, Mixtecs, Zapotecs and Mixes. The Nahuatl language was spoken in this territory, either by native speakers or simply as a lingua franca.

Popoluca is a generic Nahuatl term for other languages. In this case, it most likely refers to a Mixean language. This Popoluca language and its ethnic identity has since disappeared from this region, but a Popoluca language was reported as late as 1746 at Chacaltianguis.

The 1600 relación of Francisco Pacheco y Carvajal details the ethnic affiliation of some of the towns that were subject to Guaspaltepec. According to the report, Guaspaltepec itself and Mixtlan were inhabited by both Popolucas and Mixtecs; while Chacaltianguis, Tlacojalpa and Tesechoacan were inhabited by Popolucas.

The Mixteca Tachixca was inhabited by Mixtecs, Mixes, and possibly Mazatecs. Latani and Xochiapa were inhabited by Zapotecs, who may have been recent arrivals to the region.

== Prehispanic era and Conquest ==
The town and state were possibly subject to the Aztec Empire at the time that the Spanish arrived. Colonial-era records imply that the state of Guaspaltepec was rich and populous, probably having a population of around eighty thousand.

The list of subject towns of Guaspaltepec varies. One list comprises Latani, Xochiapa, Mixtlan, the Mixteca Tachixca, Chacaltianguizco (now Chacaltianguis), Tlacojalpa and Tesechoacan. Another list comprises Tesechoacan, Mecatepec, Chacaltianguis, Tlacojalpa, Otatitlan, Amatlan and possibly the Mixteca Tachixca.

In 1519, Moctezuma sent the governor of this area to be one of the ambassadors to receive Hernán Cortés at San Juan de Ulúa. Following the fall of Mexico-Tenochtitlan, Cortés sent Gonzalo de Sandoval to conquer the tributary province of Tuxtepec. After achieving this, Sandoval went on to conquer the other towns of the Papaloapan basin.

== Encomienda ==
Sandoval split the Papaloapan basin into different encomiendas, reserving the town of Guaspaltepec for himself because of its economic importance. After Sandoval left for Spain, the president of the first Audiencia, Nuño de Guzmán, reassigned this town to the cabildo of Veracruz and later to the contador Rodrigo de Albornoz. After 1531, half of the encomienda passed to the ownership of the Spanish crown, and the other half remained in the hands of Jorge de Alvarado, who passed it on to his heirs.

== Corregimiento ==
In 1531, following the second Audiencia, Guaspaltepec was declared a corregimiento. Guaspaltepec became the capital and home to the corregidor. Around 1560, this corregimiento was unified with the corregimiento of Cosamaloapan, as well as other encomienda towns such as Otatitlán.

== Congregación de 1600 ==
By 1600, the town was depopulated. The inhabitants had moved to Mixtan by order of the local priest. The last inhabitants were the Indian leaders and 12 tributary Indians. That same year, the judge Francisco Pacheco y Carvajal determined that these townspeople would form a congregation at a place called Cacahuaxuchitlan, together with the inhabitants of the other towns of the right bank of the Papaloapan. This finally prevented the repopulation of Guaspaltepec.

== Religion ==
The town was visited by a chaplain by 1543 at the latest. It belonged to the Diocese of Oaxaca.

Around 1600, the priest of Guaspaltepec was Pedro Fernández de Quevedo, who emigrated to the town of Chacaltianguis, though he kept using the name Guaspaltepec at least until the middle of the seventeenth century. By the eighteenth century, it was called the parish of Chacaltianguis.
