= Tres Valles =

- City and municipality
- Coat of arms

- Location of Tres Valles within Veracruz State

- Location of Tres Valles within Mexico
- Coordinates: 18°10′N 96°01′W
- Country: Mexico
- State: Veracruz
- Region: Papaloapan
- Municipality: Tres Valles

Government
  - Mayor: José Manuel Díaz Rodríguez

Area
  - Total: 378.1 km^{2} (146.0 sq mi)
- Elevation: 40 m (130 ft)

Population (2010)
  - Total: 45 097
  - Density: 82.3/km^{2} (213/sq mi)
- Time zone: UTC-6 (CST)
- Postal code: 95300
- Area code: 288
- Website: http://www.tresvalles.gob.mx/

Tres Valles (transl. Three valleys) is a town and municipality in the Mexican state of Veracruz, created as a free municipality by decree on November 25, 1988. It is located in the lower reaches of the Papaloapan, and borders the state of Oaxaca and the towns of Tierra Blanca and Cosamaloapan.

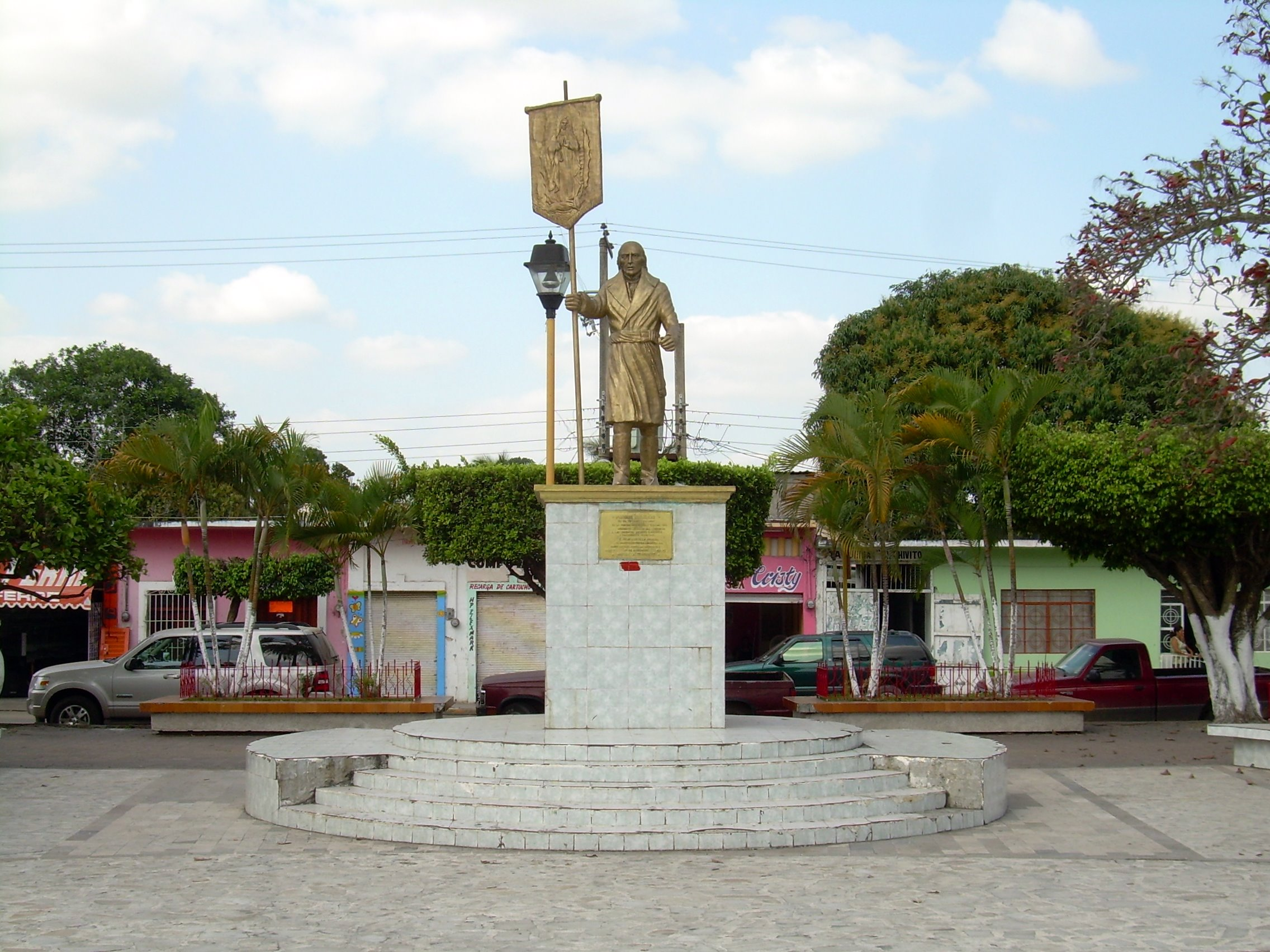
Monument of Miguel Hidalgo y Costilla

The main source of income is agriculture, particularly sugar cane cultivation, but rice, corn, beans, pineapples, sorghum, and mangoes are also grown here.

== Etymology ==
The historical origin of the name Three Valleys is uncertain, but the generally accepted version is that it was named after three valleys in the region: Valle Nacional, the Valley of Tesechoacán (currently José Azueta) and Playa Vicente. The earliest known version of the "Three Valleys" dates from 1962.

=== Prehispanic era ===
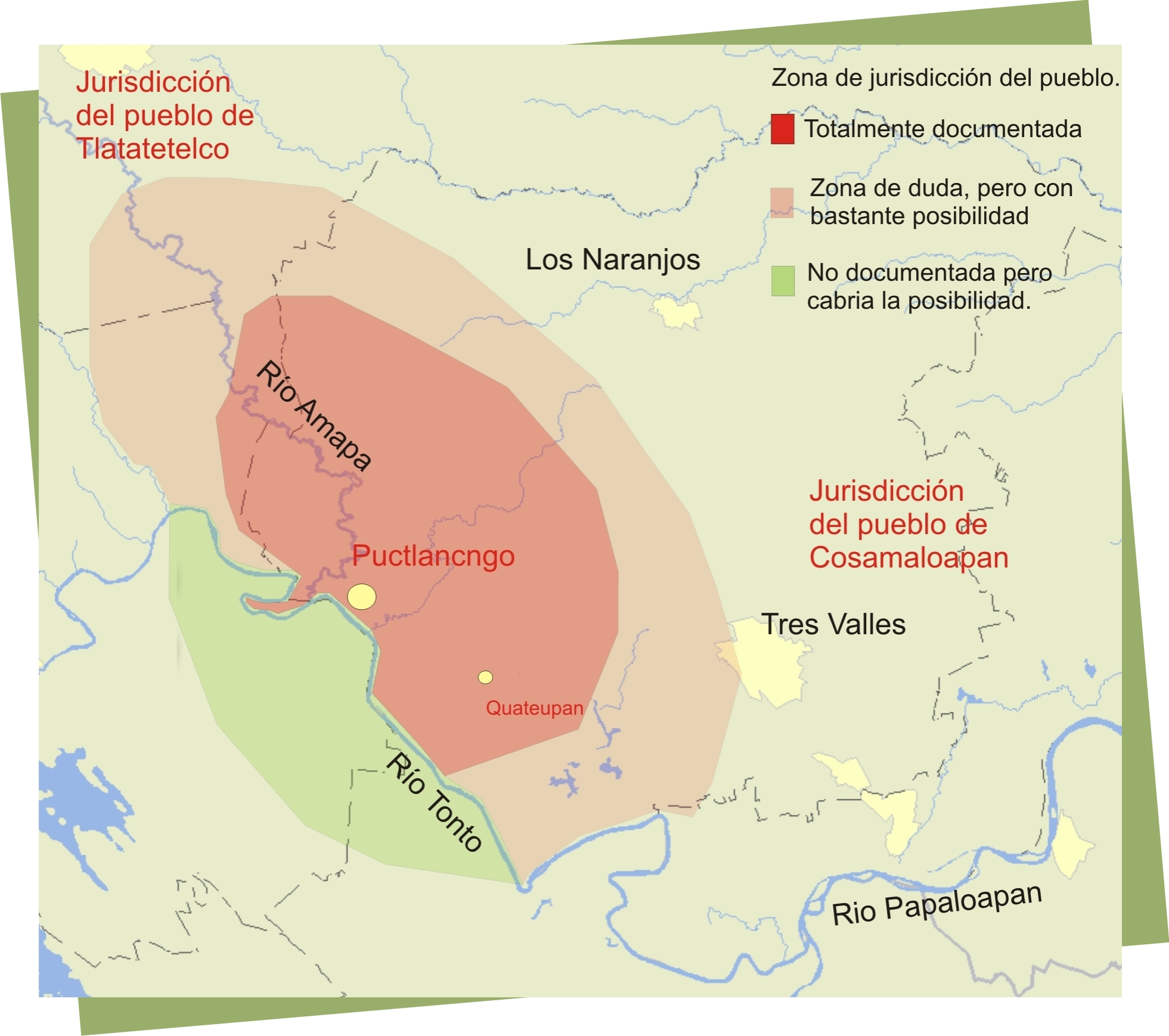
Approximate territory under jurisdiction of Puctlancingo in the 16th century.

This area of the lower Papaloapan was populated primarily by the Olmec, who disappeared for unknown reasons. Later, the area was inhabited by the Totonac, from approximately 500–100 BCE. By the time the Spanish arrived, the area had been conquered by the Mexicas, as with much of the Mesoamerican peoples.

The current municipality of Tres Valles was divided between the jurisdictions of Cosamaloapan and Puctlancingo, but the only people on record within the current limits were the Puctlancingo, located at the confluence of the Amapa and Tonto rivers. It is likely that there were other small settlements at the time of conquest. A 1584 map showed a hill with ruins called Quateupan south of the Coapilla creek, near the river Tonto.

=== Colonial period ===
After the fall of Tenochtitlan, Cortés sent Gonzalo de Sandoval to the conquest of the Tuxtepec garrison. Achieving his mission, he subjected the people of the Papaloapan basin to the encomienda system. Cosamaloapan joined the jurisdiction of the district of Guaspaltepec to form one corregimiento (township).

In 1600, Tuxtepec and Puctlancingo were added to the congregation of the province Guaspaltepec. That same year, Guaspaltepec was abandoned, its inhabitants were living in Mixtlan, the head priest moved to Chacaltianguis and the fate of the township was in the air. After the disappearance of Guaspaltepec the district came under the power of Cosamaloapan.

In 1786 the Spanish crown ordered the creation of the Municipality of Veracruz. The area remained a Canton until 1917. Consequently, the municipality became important for political and administrative organization.

=== Foundation ===
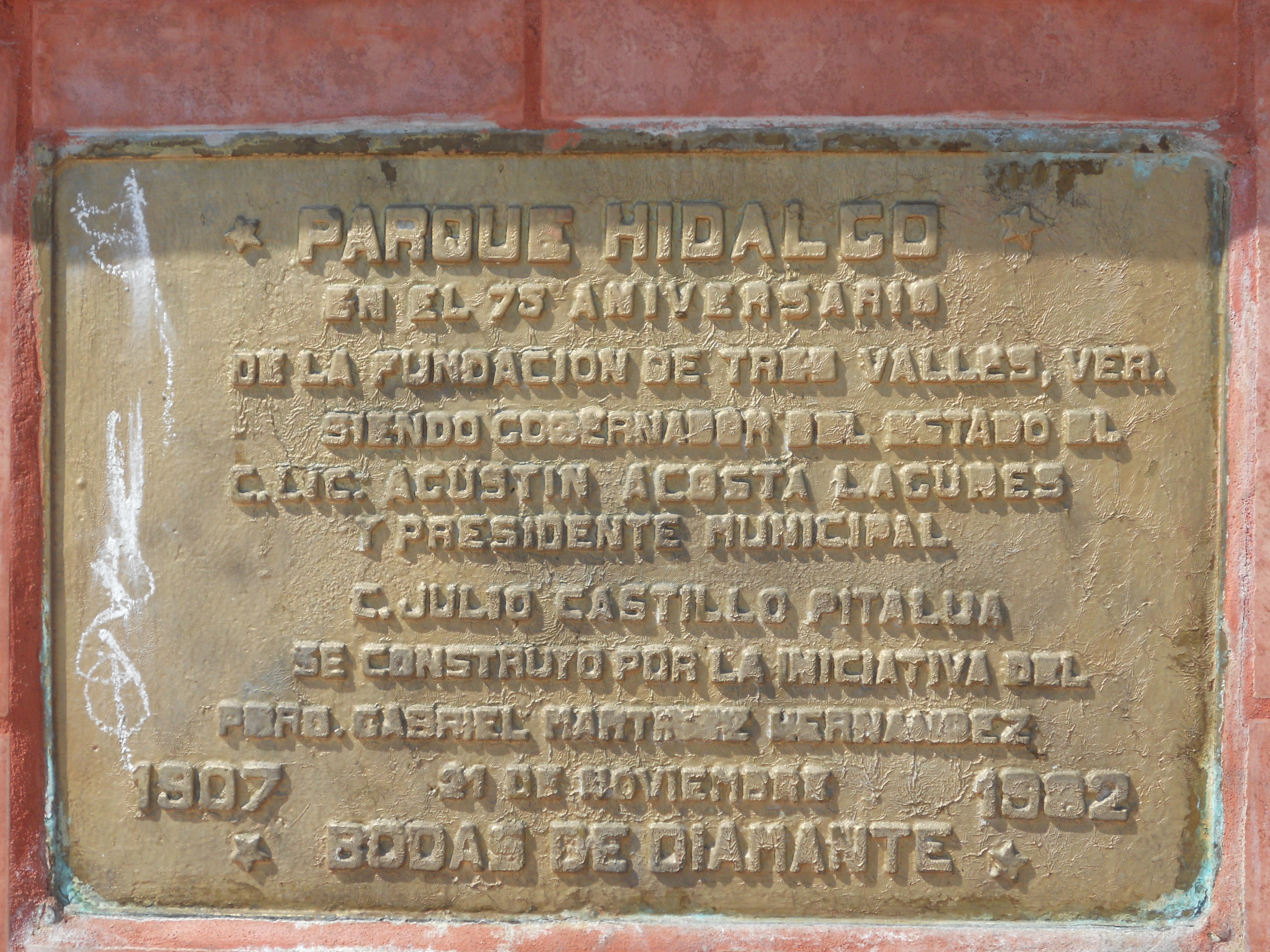
Monument to Miguel Hidalgo

November 21, 1907, is considered the founding date of the city of Tres Valles. However, the exact date is unknown. The earliest record with that date in 1982, when a commemorative monument to Miguel Hidalgo was placed in the city's central park. It seems that during the process of building the monument, the date was established. There's also a document dated November 24, 1939, stating that the founding was "32 years ago", that is, around 1907.

According to historians the settlement has existed since at least 1900, when a camp was created for builders of the Pacific Veracruz railway. The only relevant fact pointing to this period is the 1907 arrival of the Martinez family, owners of the land where the town was settled. Perhaps this and other facts have survived in the collective memory and over the passage of time, this has become the year considered the foundation of the community.

=== Post-Revolutionary era ===
In 1921, Three Valleys had a population of 791 persons (399 men and 392 women).

In 1924, the first school was established (which now houses the School "March 18") which was directed by Prof. "Nacha", originally from Tierra Blanca, Veracruz. It was built by Ignacio Martinez, who also donated the land.

Also in 1924, Martinez built the first Catholic chapel, in honor of Our Lady of Guadalupe. This location is now the Municipal Agency, as the chapel was stripped during the Cristero War.

The banana boom ended with the plague the Sigatoka fungus. Soon after came the expropriation of the three banana companies, decreed by President Lázaro Cárdenas, which were merged into the "Transcontinental" company.

The municipality of Tres Valles was created by decree on November 25, 1988, from territory segregated from the municipality of Cosamaloapan.

== Geography ==
Geographical Maps of Tres Valles
hidrología	Climas

=== Location ===
The municipal territory covers an area of approximately 378.1 km^{2} (146.0 sq mi), and is located in the south-central area of Veracruz, bounded by 96 ° 01 'and 96 ° 18' west of Greenwich and between 18 ° 10 '18 25' north latitude, in the region of Papalopan. The municipality of Tres Valles borders Tierra Blanca to the north, east, and west; the municipality of Cosamaloapan to the east and south; and the state of Oaxaca to the south and west.

=== Hydrography ===
The main rivers are the Amapa and Tonto, followed in importance by the Hondo, Mondongo, the Coyote, Zapote, and Jobo.

=== Climate ===
The climate in Tres Valles is tropical with an average temperature of 25°C and an average annual rainfall of 1,307 mm. The municipality's climate is classified as warm subhumid with summer rains and warm humid with abundant summer rains. Tres Valles has a warm humid climate, with winter rainfall makingup less than 5% of the annual rainfall. The rainy season is in autumn, and June is the hottest month of the year. There is no weather station in the municipality, and the nearest station is in located in Ciudad Alemán.

Climate data for CD. Alemán, Veracruz
Month	Jan	Feb	Mar	Apr	May	Jun	Jul	Aug	Sep	Oct	Nov	Dec	Year
Record high °F	97.7	103.1	107.6	109.4	113.9	112.1	104.0	101.3	102.2	99.5	96.8	95.0	113.9
Mean daily maximum °F	81.1	83.5	89.6	93.9	96.8	93.2	90.7	90.7	89.8	87.4	84.6	81.9	88.5
Mean daily minimum °F	63.0	63.7	67.1	70.7	73.9	74.1	72.7	72.7	72.9	70.9	68.0	64.9	69.6
Record low °F	50.0	32.0	51.8	57.2	64.4	66.2	66.2	66.2	65.3	58.1	54.5	45.5	32.0
Average precipitation inches	1.37	1.07	0.83	1.06	4.09	13.04	16.57	14.95	14.20	6.33	3.26	1.86	78.63
Record high °C	36.5	39.5	42.0	43.0	45.5	44.5	40.0	38.5	39.0	37.5	36.0	35.0	45.5
Mean daily maximum °C	27.3	28.6	32.0	34.4	36.0	34.0	32.6	32.6	32.1	30.8	29.2	27.7	31.4
Mean daily minimum °C	17.2	17.6	19.5	21.5	23.3	23.4	22.6	22.6	22.7	21.6	20.0	18.3	20.9
Record low °C	10.0	0.0	11.0	14.0	18.0	19.0	19.0	19.0	18.5	14.5	12.5	7.5	0.0
Average precipitation mm	34.9	27.2	21.0	27.0	103.9	331.1	420.8	379.8	360.8	160.7	82.8	47.2	1,997.2

== Demographics ==
Tres Valles is one of the most populated municipalities in the region, behind only Tierra Blanca (94 090) and Cosamaloapan (57 336).

Its population centres include:

Population Centres
Population Centre	Coordinates	Population 2005	Distance from municipal seat(km)
Tres Valles	18°14′00″N 96°08′00″W	16030	0
Los Naranjos	18°21′14″N 96°09′59″W	3444	13
Novara	18°12′00″N 96°06′32″W	2650	5
Poblado 3	18°17′24″N 96°05′33″W	2186	7
Col. Obrera	18°15′24″N 96°09′42″W	1821	3
Sources: INEGI

=== Ethnic groups ===
According to the results of Population and Housing Census conducted by the National Institute of Statistics and Geography in 2010, the population over three years in the municipality of Tres Valles is 42,846 inhabitants, of which 3364 belong to an [Indigenous peoples of Mexico | indigenous group], being speakers of any dialect. This represents 7.85% of the population.

Indigeonous Population by Dialect
Dialect	Speakers	Males	Females
Chinantecan	1989	895	1094
Mazatecan	804	398	406
Zapotec	48	22	26
Náhuatl	35	17	18
Mixtecan	27	10	17
Mayan	6	6	0
Cuicatec	3	1	2
Ixcatec	2	1	1
Popoluca	2	1	1
Huave	1	1	0
None Specified	43	23	20
Total	2960	1375	1585

== Government and administration ==
=== Municipal administration ===
The Three Valleys government consists of a mayor, a trustee, and a council consisting of five council members: two elected by a relative majority and three by proportional representation.

The current mayor, Dr. Carlos Alberto Córdova Morales, started office on January 1, 2011, representing the National Action Party.

Municipal Presidents of Tres Valles
Period	Name	Party
1988–1991	Fernando Cano Cano	CM
1992–1994	Pedro Aguilar Ibáñez	PRI
1995–1997	Helen B. Fernández López	PPS
1998–2000	Francisco Ochoa Cortés	PRI
2001–2004	Valentín Reyes López	Coal. PT–PRD
2005–2007	Adriana Loreto Leal Zatarain	Coal. PRD–PT -Convergence
2008–2010	Juan Manuel Maus Martínez	Coal. PRI–PVEM

=== Legislative Representation ===
==== State ====
The municipality is located in the 18th Electoral District of Veracruz with headquarters in the city of Cosamaloapan. The current representative is Elena Aguirre Zamorano of PRI.

==== Federal ====
In the 17th Electoral District of Veracruz, headquartered in Cosamaloapan, the representative is José Luis Álvarez Martínez of PRI.

== Infrastructure ==
=== Highways ===
Principal roads of Tres Valles.

The municipal area has many roads, both paved and gravel, used for intra- and inter- municipality travel.

==== Federal ====
The main federal road passing through is Highway 145, which connects La Tinaja, Ciudad Alemán, and Sayula. The entire route is a paved two-lane road, crossing through some important towns such as La Granja, Three Valleys and Novara. On this road are the municipality's main industries: the sugar, and paper mills, the pork processor and rice fields.

==== State ====
• Tres Valles – Poblado 3 Road, two lanes and paved.

• Tres Valles – Los Naranjos Road, with a paved stretch from Tres Valles to Loma San Juan.

• Loma San Juan – Los Naranjos Road, two-laned dirt road.

==== Interstate ====
• La Granja – Temascal Road, two-laned and paved.

== Popular festivals ==
•Last week of March and beginning of April: The Festival of Flowers

•April: Carnival

•November 20: Feast of Christ the King

•Last week of November: Agricultural, Livestock, Cultural and Industrial Fair.

== Notable people ==
Ignacio Martínez Gutiérrez

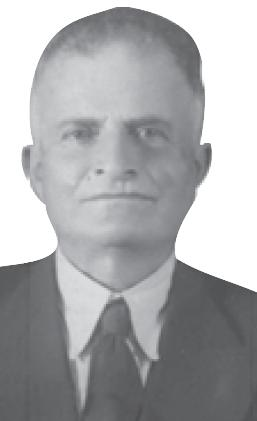
Ignacio Martínes.

Born in 1884 and died in 1966. Son of Dona Refugio Gutierrez Gil and Jesús Martínez Ochoa, a native of Chavinda, Michoacán. Former Tres Valles Municipal Agent. When smallpox lashed the region, he founded the school which would later be called "March 18". He married Dona Trinidad Hernández Huerta of Tehuacan, Puebla on May 25, 1906, in the parish of San Juan Bautista, San Juan de la Punta, now Cuitlahuac. From there they moved to the Tres Valles area, taking possession of 2,500 acres (10 km^{2}) of land, where he created a plantation and founded Tres Valles. He had several sons and daughters, some of whom chose the priesthood, including Father Jesus (Otatitlán pastor for many years), Ignacio (Brother Marist) and Father Gabriel Martinez (pastor of Tres Valles).

Gabriel Martínez Hernández

Born on January 6, 1921, known as Father Gabriel.

At an early age he went to study at a boarding school with his older brothers at a Marist College in Tlalpan, Mexico, where he heard the call of God at 13 years, thereby going to a seminary in 1933. He was ordained priest in the parish of San Miguel de Orizaba, Veracruz, on March 25, 1944, and was sent to service the ministry entrusted to him, the people of Naolinco, Veracruz, where he spent two and a half years.

Subsequently appointed by the bishop as the Vicar of Tres Valles on September 21, 1946. He came to the city as a spiritual father on 22 October of that year. Conditions for undertaking the mission of evangelization in the town of Tres Valles were unfavorable, because the authorities in times of religious persecution were given the task of abolishing the faith of the people. The people themselves were excited to have a spiritual guide. Tres Valles only had a rustic chapel in the outskirts of the city, so there was the need to erect a chapel in a central location. This was built on December 5, 1976, on the land opposite the park.

Francisco Sánchez Contreras

Born in Tres Valles on September 23, 1938. With a degree in Law from the University of Veracruz. In 1963 he served as a promoter of civic activities of the Department of Social Action. In 1969 was appointed Organising Secretary of the CDE, PRI.

He has published several articles on socio-political topics. On February 16, 1987, he served as Secretary of the Joint Land Commission. He died on May 30, 2011, in Xalapa, Veracruz.

Ignacio Villaseñor Arano

Born in Tres Valles on December 6, 1942. With degrees in International Relations from UNAM and the Catholic University of Leuven. In 1973 he became Deputy Director General of the Foreign Service, and in 1976 he became the Deputy Director General of Foreign Service and Director of the Mexican Embassy in Britain in 1977. He became Managing Director of Regional Organizations in 1979. In 1982 he was minister and chargé d'affaires in the U.S. and then Senior Director for Bilateral Affairs, and became Ambassador to Ecuador in 1989. He has been decorated by many countries.

== Economy ==
=== Industry ===
==== Sugar Mill ====
The Tres Valles sugar mill was built by the Federal Government in 1978 to meet the requirements of refined sugar in the production of soft drinks. It has been operated since 1988 by PIASA and has a milling capacity of approximately 11,000 tons of cane a day, generating more than 1500 tons of sugar per 24 hours.

==== Pulp and Paper ====
On June 22, 1972, saw the creation of Papel Periódico on the instructions of then-president of Mexico, Luis Echeverría Álvarez, for the manufacture of newsprint, using sugarcane as the basic raw material.

=== Agriculture ===
==== Sugarcane ====
Tres Valles is the largest producer of sugarcane in the state and the fifth largest nationally. According to SAGARPA. In 2009, 28,000 hectares were under cultivation with 24,000 being crushed by the Tres Valles mill. The sugar industry is the most important generator of jobs in the local economy, and the main source of income for at least 14,000 people.

==== Rice ====
Within Mexico, Veracruz and Campeche are the major producers of rice. Tres Valles is the largest producer of rice in the state of Veracruz and the first nationally.

==== Other ====
As an extremely fertile municipality, there are many agricultural products grown for personal consumption or for sale. These include:

State Position	Product	Area under cultivation (Hectares)	Production (Tonnes)	Value (Mexican Pesos)
83	Corn	1 330.00	2940.00	5 810 880
7	Sorghum	750.00	2100.00	3 150 000
9	Pineapples	30.00	1245.00	3 703 880

== Tourism ==
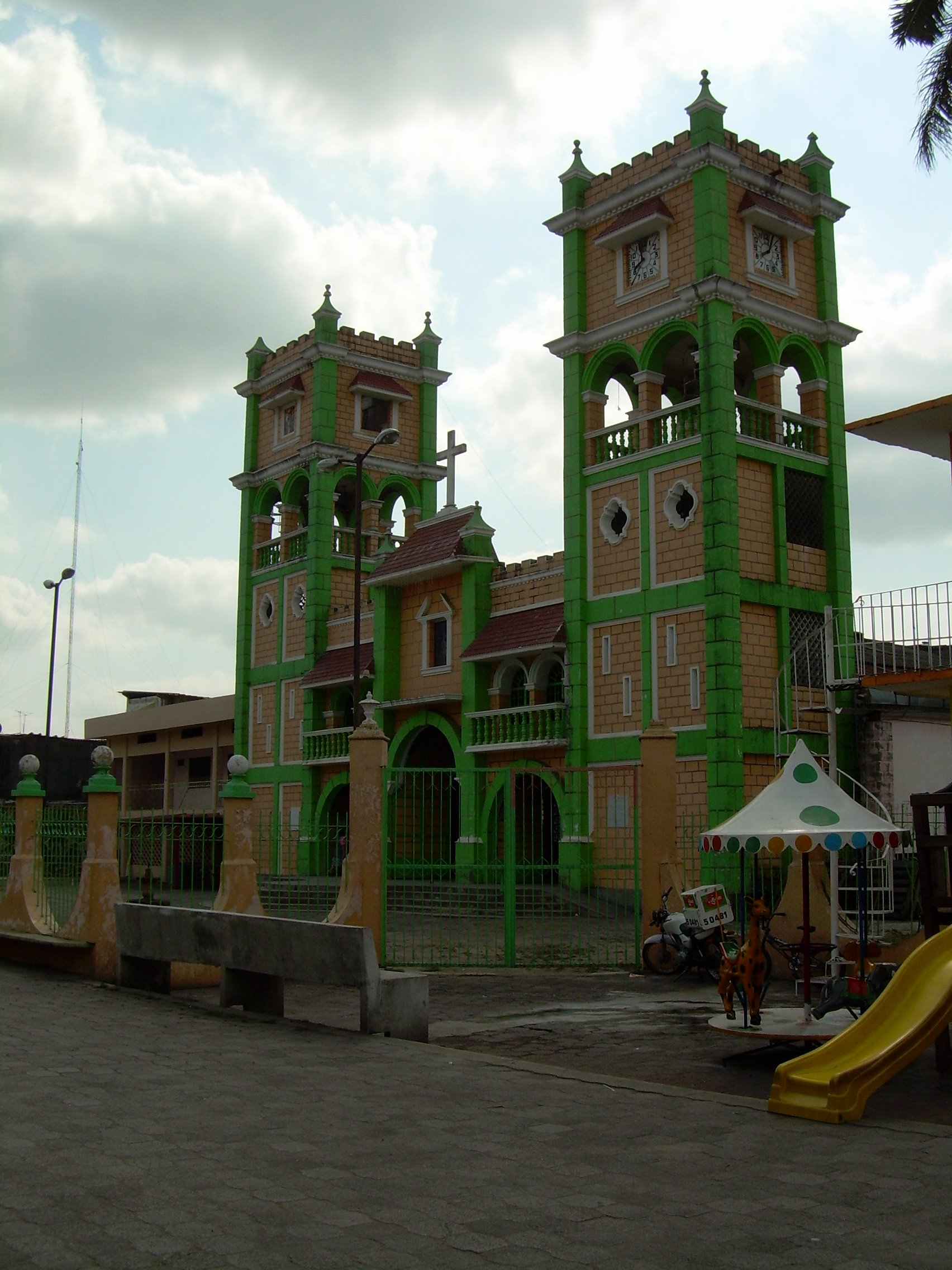
Catholic Church of Christ the King.

The most important buildings are the Three Valleys Municipal Palace (built after 1988) and the parish church of Christ the King.

Monuments include: a statue of Don Miguel Hidalgo y Costilla, a bust of Benito Juárez, the "Father of the Americas", a bust of Emiliano Zapata, and a monument dedicated to mothers.

== Gastronomy ==
Tres Valles has extensive gastronomic heritage, which over the years has been enriched by the influence of the Chinantec and Mazatec people who have settled in this county. Delicacies include: the corn tamale with both fresh and red sauce, pudding, coconut candies, sweet cocoa, rice, dumplings, and stuffed plantains.
