= Lerdo de Tejada, Veracruz =

Lerdo de Tejada
- Municipality
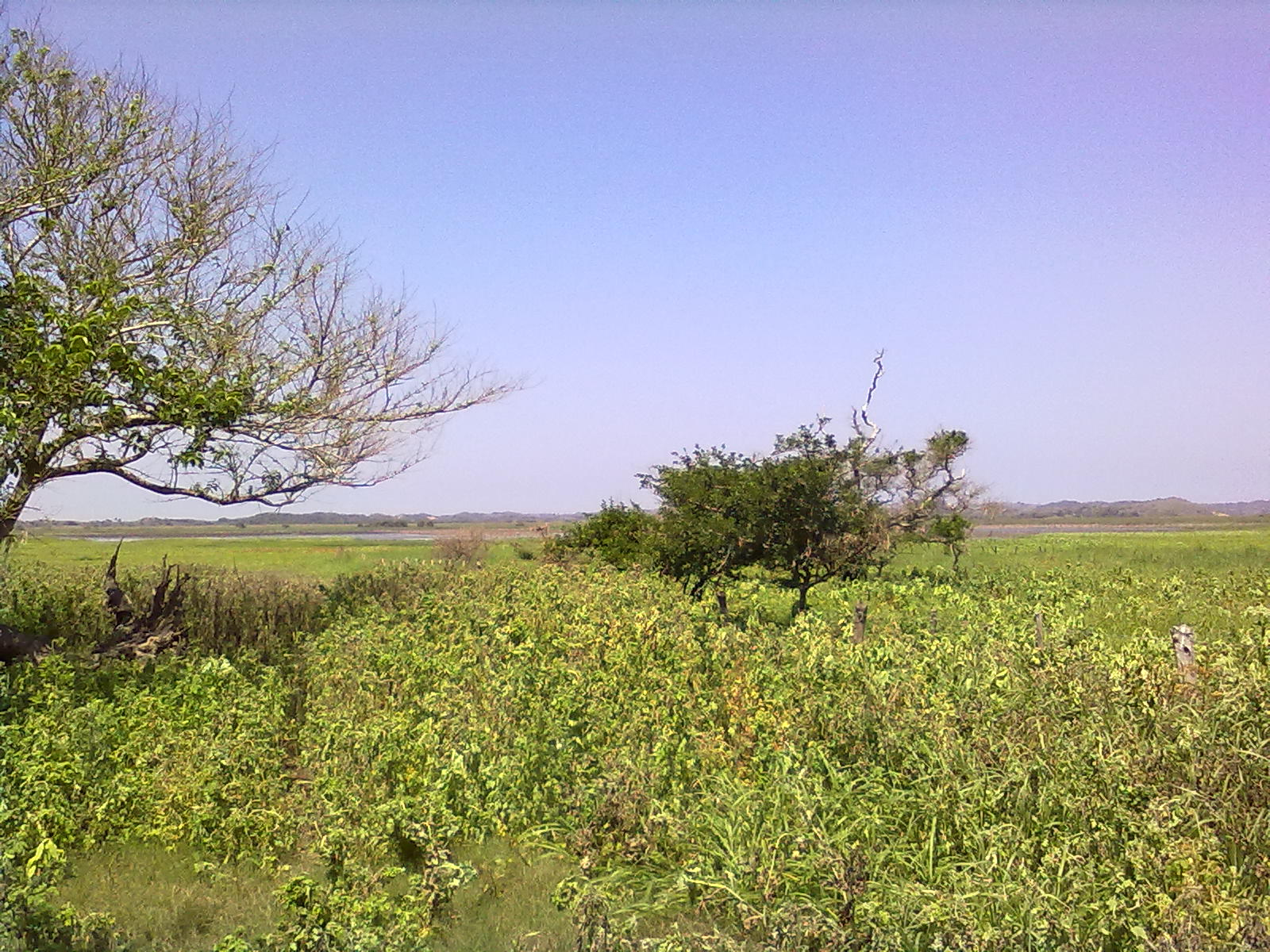

- Location in Mexico Lerdo de Tejada (Mexico)
- Coordinates: 18°37′26″N 95°30′51″W
- Country: Mexico
- State: Veracruz
- Region: Papaloapan
- Established: 23 January 1923
- Named for: Sebastián Lerdo de Tejada
- Municipal seat: Lerdo de Tejada

Government
  - Mayor: Hermas Cortes García

Area
  - Total: 84.245 km^{2} (32.527 sq mi)
- Elevation (of seat): 10 m (33 ft)

Population (2010 Census)
  - Total: 20,141
  - Estimate (2015 Intercensal Survey): 19,606
  - Density: 239.08/km^{2} (619.21/sq mi)
  - Seat: 18,715
- Time zone: UTC-6 (Central)
- Postal codes: 95280–95295
- Area code: 284
- Website: lerdodetejada.gob.mx

Lerdo de Tejada is a municipality in the Mexican state of Veracruz, located 207 kilometres (129 mi) southeast of the state capital Xalapa. It is named after Sebastián Lerdo de Tejada, the 27th President of Mexico.

== Geography ==
The municipality of Lerdo de Tejada is located in southern Veracruz on the coastal plain of the Gulf of Mexico. It borders the municipalities of Ángel R. Cabada to the east, Saltabarranca to the south, Tlacotalpan to the southwest and Alvarado to the west. The municipality covers an area of 84.245 square kilometres (32.527 sq mi) and comprises 0.1% of the state's area.

The wetland La Popotera is located in Lerdo de Tejada and the adjacent municipality of Alvarado. It is protected as a Ramsar site. La Popotera is drained by the San Agustín River, which is a tributary of the Papaloapan River and also serves as the municipality's southwestern border. There is also a small lake known as the Laguna del Márquez located on the municipality's eastern border with Ángel R. Cabada.

Lerdo de Tejada's climate is warm and humid with abundant rain in the summer. Average temperatures in the municipality range between 24 and 28 °C (75–82 °F), and average annual precipitation ranges between 2,000 and 2,500 millimetres (79–98 in).

Climate data for Naranjal weather station at 18°38′47″N 95°31′55″W (1981–2010 averages, 1951–2010 extremes)
Month	Jan	Feb	Mar	Apr	May	Jun	Jul	Aug	Sep	Oct	Nov	Dec	Year
Record high °C (°F)	36.0 (96.8)	39.0 (102.2)	42.0 (107.6)	43.0 (109.4)	44.0 (111.2)	41.5 (106.7)	38.0 (100.4)	39.0 (102.2)	38.5 (101.3)	37.5 (99.5)	36.0 (96.8)	36.0 (96.8)	44.0 (111.2)
Mean daily maximum °C (°F)	25.9 (78.6)	27.4 (81.3)	30.2 (86.4)	32.7 (90.9)	34.1 (93.4)	33.2 (91.8)	32.1 (89.8)	32.0 (89.6)	31.2 (88.2)	30.1 (86.2)	28.5 (83.3)	26.4 (79.5)	27.0 (80.6)
Daily mean °C (°F)	21.2 (70.2)	22.5 (72.5)	24.6 (76.3)	27.0 (80.6)	28.6 (83.5)	28.2 (82.8)	27.4 (81.3)	27.3 (81.1)	26.9 (80.4)	25.8 (78.4)	23.9 (75.0)	22.0 (71.6)	25.5 (77.9)
Mean daily minimum °C (°F)	16.5 (61.7)	17.6 (63.7)	19.1 (66.4)	21.3 (70.3)	23.1 (73.6)	23.2 (73.8)	22.7 (72.9)	22.6 (72.7)	22.5 (72.5)	21.5 (70.7)	19.2 (66.6)	17.5 (63.5)	20.6 (69.1)
Record low °C (°F)	1.5 (34.7)	8.0 (46.4)	10.0 (50.0)	0.0 (32.0)	3.0 (37.4)	18.0 (64.4)	18.0 (64.4)	2.5 (36.5)	17.0 (62.6)	15.0 (59.0)	10.5 (50.9)	6.5 (43.7)	0.0 (32.0)
Average precipitation mm (inches)	97.1 (3.82)	46.0 (1.81)	22.2 (0.87)	32.1 (1.26)	72.7 (2.86)	181.7 (7.15)	287.9 (11.33)	312.9 (12.32)	493.2 (19.42)	313.2 (12.33)	196.3 (7.73)	120.3 (4.74)	2,175.6 (85.65)
Average precipitation days (≥ 0.1 mm)	9.0	5.2	2.9	3.2	4.2	10.5	14.9	14.7	16.8	13.7	10.5	10.9	116.5
Source: Servicio Meteorológico Nacional

== History ==
The Codex Mendoza mentions a calpulli of Tlacotalpan called Tlazintla located in what is now Lerdo de Tejada.

After the Spanish conquest of the Aztec Empire, Tlazintla served as a port for one of New Spain's first sugarcane mills built by Hernán Cortés near San Andrés Tuxtla, which remained in operation for over fifty years. In the 1800s, the San Pedro and San Francisco sugarcane mills were built in the area. Around 1876, the ranchería of San Francisco Naranjal was founded by settlers from San Andrés and Santiago Tuxtla. On 31 December 1901, San Francisco Naranjal became the seat of the municipality of Saltabarranca. On 23 January 1923, San Francisco Naranjal was separated from the rest of Saltabarranca and became its own municipality, which on 11 August 1923 was renamed Lerdo de Tejada.

== Administration ==
The municipal government comprises a president, a councillor (Spanish: síndico), and two trustees (regidores), one elected by relative majority and one by proportional representation. The current president of the municipality is Hermas Cortes García.

== Demographics ==
In the 2010 Census, the municipality of Lerdo de Tejada recorded a population of 20,141 inhabitants living in 5987 households. It recorded a population of 19,606 inhabitants in the 2015 Intercensal Survey.

There are 30 localities in the municipality, of which only the municipal seat is classified as urban. Also called Lerdo de Tejada, it recorded a population of 18,715 inhabitants in the 2010 Census.

== Economy ==
Sugarcane is the main crop grown in Lerdo de Tejada and sugarcane processing is the main industrial activity. Declining sugar prices since 2011 have caused a crisis in the local economy and forced the closure of the San Francisco Naranjal mill. The remaining San Pedro mill, located southwest of the municipal seat at 18°36′39.7″N 95°31′47.8″W, produced 119,150 tonnes of sugar in the 2014–2015 season.
