= Gregorio Barradas Miravete =

Mexican politician

- Born: February 8, 1982; Juan Rodríguez Clara, Veracruz, Mexico
- Died: November 8, 2010 (aged 28); Isla, Veracruz, Mexico
- Cause of death: Homicide
- Occupation: Politician
- Spouse: Xochitl

Gregorio Barradas Miravete (8 February 1982 – 8 November 2010) was a Mexican peasant and politician, affiliated with the National Action Party (PAN).

He was born in Juan Rodríguez Clara, Veracruz, in 1982.

In the 2006 general election he was elected to the Chamber of Deputies to represent Veracruz's 20th district for a three-year term.

He was elected municipal president (mayor) of Juan Rodríguez Clara in 2010. On 8 November 2010, however, he was kidnapped and killed before taking office. Omar Manzur, his substitute for the mayoral position, was killed along with him.

He was survived by his widow, Xóchitl.

== See also ==
- Mexican drug war
- List of kidnappings
- List of politicians killed in the Mexican drug war
- List of unsolved murders (2000–present)
