= Santiago Sochiapan =

- Municipality and town
- Location in Mexico
- Coordinates: 18°39′N 95°44′W
- Country: Mexico
- State: Veracruz
- Region: Papaloapan

Area
  - Total: 40.04 km^{2} (15.46 sq mi)

Population (2005)
  - Total: 7,639
- Time zone: UTC-6 (Central Standard Time)

Santiago Sochiapan is a municipality located in the south of the Papaloapan zone in the central zone of the Mexican state of Veracruz, about 240 km from the state capital Xalapa. It has a surface of 40.04 km^{2}. It is located at 18°39′N 95°44′W.

== Name ==
The name comes from the language Náhuatl, Xochi-apa-tlan; that means "Place with blue flowers".

== Geography ==
The municipality of Santiago Sochiapan is bordered to the north and east by Playa Vicente and to the south and west by Oaxaca.

== Agriculture ==
It produces principally maize, beans, green chile, watermelon, coffee and tomato.

== Celebrations ==
Every May, a festival is held to celebrate Aposto Santiago, patron of the town and in December there is a festival held in honor of the Virgin of Guadalupe.
