= Ignacio de la Llave (municipality) =

Ignacio de la Llave La Mixtequilla
- Municipality
- Villa de Ignacio de la Llave
- Location in Veracruz
- Coordinates: 18°39′42″N 95°58′20″W
- Country: Mexico
- State: Veracruz
- Region: Papaloapan
- Established: 1838
- Named for: Ignacio de la Llave
- Municipal Seat: Ignacio de la Llave

Government
  - Mayor: Juan Jose Flores Lira (PRI)

Area
  - Total: 397.13 km^{2} (153.33 sq mi)
- Elevation: 7 m (23 ft)

Population (2010)
  - Total: 17,370
- Time zone: UTC-6 (CST)
- Website: www.ignaciodelallave.gob.mx

Ignacio de la Llave, previously known as San Cristobal de la Llave, is a municipality located in the region of La Mixtequilla, which is near the western limit of the Papaloapan river, going through the Blanco, Limón and Las Pozas rivers. The climate of the region varies between hot-humid and tropical-humid, with frequent summer rains between July and September. The average temperature is from 64 and 72 °F, with a maximum registered in the high 70s °F (24-26°C) and the lowest in the high 40 °F (7-9°C). Ignacio de la Llave is a neighbor to and has deep political, social and trading relationships with: Alvarado, Acula, Ixmatlahuacan, Tlalixcoyan and Tierra Blanca.

The municipality celebrates its carnival in the month of March were music, dances and joy are spread by its inhabitants.

Mayor Juan José Flores Lira died of a heart attack on April 24, 2017.

== Toponymy ==
The municipality's is named after General Ignacio de la Llave, who was governor for the state of Veracruz from 1861 to 1862. It shares its name with the state of Veracruz, just in a different order.

== Physical medium ==
=== Location ===
It's located in the central zone of the state of Veracruz, in the previously known zone named Las llanuras del sotavento, in the economic-administrative region called the Papaloapan Region.

=== Borders ===
It borders on the north with the municipalities of Tlalixcoyan and Alvarado, to the south with Ixmatlahuacan and Tierra Blanca, to the west with Tierra Blanca and Tlalixcoyan and to the east with Alvarado and Ixmatlahuacan.
