= Playa Vicente =

Municipality in Veracruz, Mexico

- City and municipality
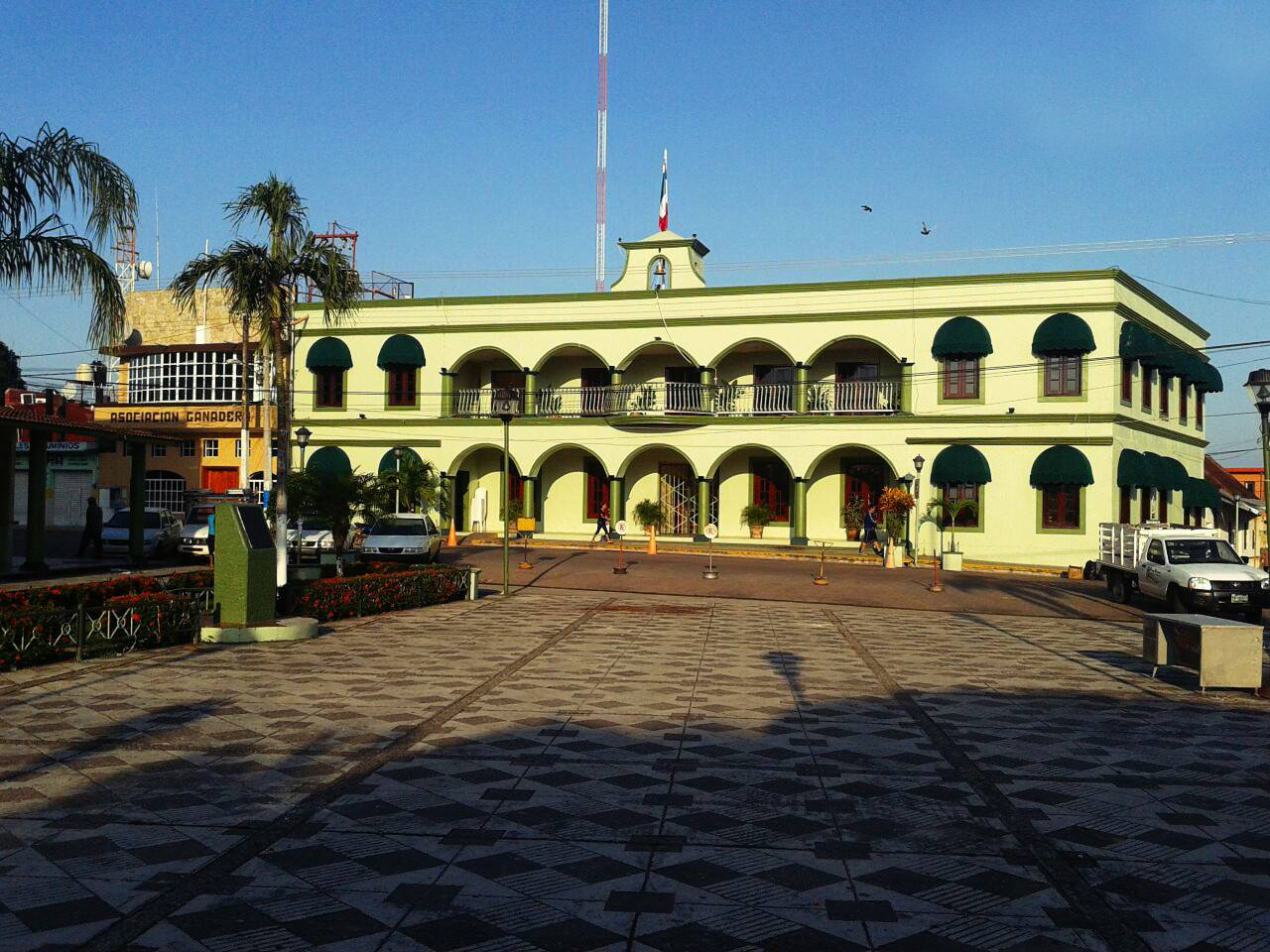
- Palacio municipal de Playa Vicente

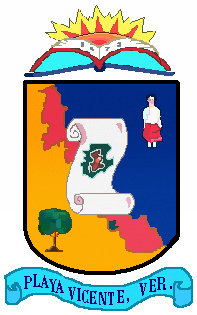
- Coat of arms

- Location in Veracruz

- Location within Veracruz Location within Mexico
- Coordinates: 17°49′52″N 95°48′43″W -->
- Country: Mexico
- State: Veracruz
- Region: Papaloapan Region
- Founded: 1873

Area
  - Municipality: 1,196 km^{2} (462 sq mi)
- Elevation: 150 m (490 ft)

Population (2020)
  - Municipality: 39,327
  - Seat: 8,969 (2020)
- Time zone: UTC-6 (Central (US Central))

Playa Vicente is a municipality located in the south zone of the Mexican state of Veracruz, about 220 km from the state capital Xalapa. It has a surface of 2,122.14 km^{2}. It is located at 17°50′N 95°49′W.

== History ==
The prehispanic state of Guaspaltepec was located in the vicinity of Playa Vicente.

Playa Vicente was declared a city by decree on January 14th, 1930 and its name changed to Venustiano Carranza, after the revolutionary leader. The former name of Playa Vicente was reinstituted by decree on December 14th, 1937.

== Geography ==
The municipality of Playa Vicente is delimited to the north by José Azueta and Isla, to the east by Juan Rodríguez Clara and to the south and west by Oaxaca State. Playa Vicente is watered by the rivers La Lana and Playa Vicente.

The weather in Playa Vicente is warm and wet all year with rains in summer and autumn.

== Agriculture ==
It produces principally maize, beans, orange fruit, coffee and mango.

== Culture ==
The patron of the town is the Virgen de la Candelaria. A celebration in her honor takes place in February, and a celebration in honor of Virgen de Guadalupe takes place in December.
