= Tlacojalpan =

Municipality in Veracruz, Mexico

- Municipality
- Location in Mexico Tlacojalpan (Mexico)
- Country: Mexico
- State: Veracruz
- Demonym: (in Spanish)
- Time zone: UTC−6 (CST)

Tlacojalpan is a municipality in the Mexican state of Veracruz, about 175 km (109 mi) from the state capital Xalapa. It has a surface of 91.30 km2. It is located at 18°14′N 95°57′W.

== Name ==
The name comes from the language Náhuatl, Tlahco-xal-pan; that means "In the half of the sandbank".

== Geography ==
The municipality of Tlacojalpan is delimited to the north by Cosamaloapan, to the east by Tuxtilla, to the south by Oaxaca State and to the west by Otatitlán. It is watered by creeks that are tributaries of the Papaloapan River.

The weather in Tlacojalpan is very warm and wet all year with rains in summer and autumn.

== Agriculture ==
It produces principally maize, beans, rice, sugarcane and mango.

== Celebrations ==
In Tlacojalpan, in January takes place the celebration in honor to San Cristobal, Patron of the town, and in December takes place the celebration in honor to Virgen de Guadalupe.
