= Isla, Veracruz =

- Municipality and seat
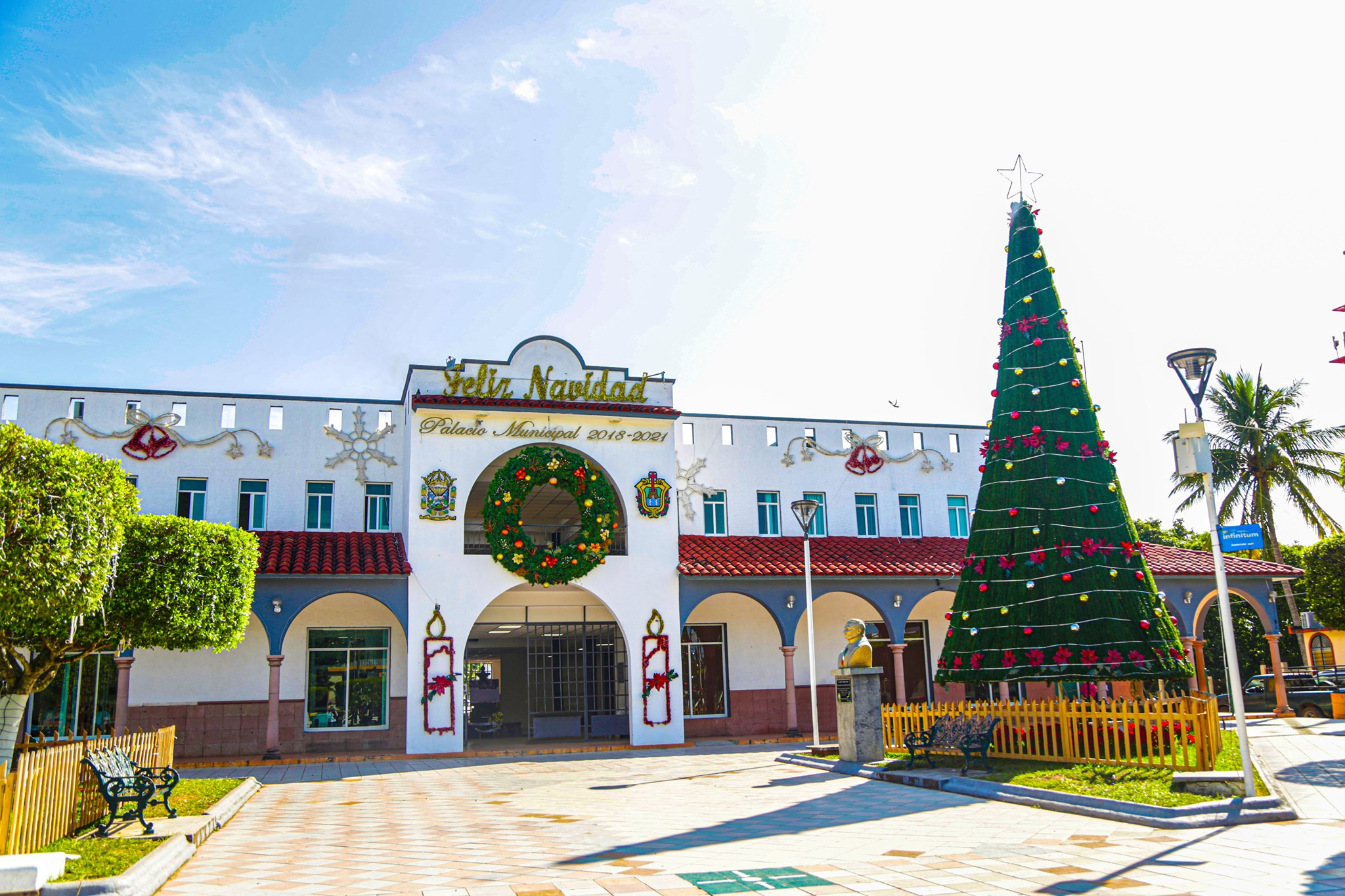
- Municipal palace

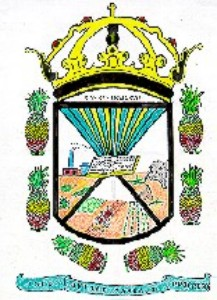
- Coat of arms

- Location in Veracruz Isla, Veracruz (Mexico)
- Coordinates: 18°02′N 95°32′W
- Country: Mexico
- State: Veracruz
- Region: Papaloapan Region (Veracruz)

Government
  - Federal electoral district: Veracruz's 3rd

Population (2020 census)
  - Total: 42,807

Isla is a municipality in the Mexican state of Veracruz. It is located in the south zone of the state, about 370 km from the state capital Xalapa. It has a surface of 714.80 km^{2}. It is located at 18°02′N 95°32′W.

== Etymology ==
In Spanish, the word "Isla" means "Island".

== Geography ==
The municipality of Isla is delimited to the north by the municipalities of Tlacotalpan and Santiago Tuxtla, to the east by Hueyapan de Ocampo and Juan Rodríguez Clara, to the south by Playa Vicente and to the west by José Azueta.

The weather in Isla is warm all year with rains in summer and autumn.

== Products ==
It produces principally maize, beans, rice, watermelon and pineapple.

== Events ==
In Isla, in May takes place the celebration in honor to Sagrado Corazón, Patron of the town.
