= Tlacotalpan (municipality) =

- Municipality
- Municipality of Tlacotalpan
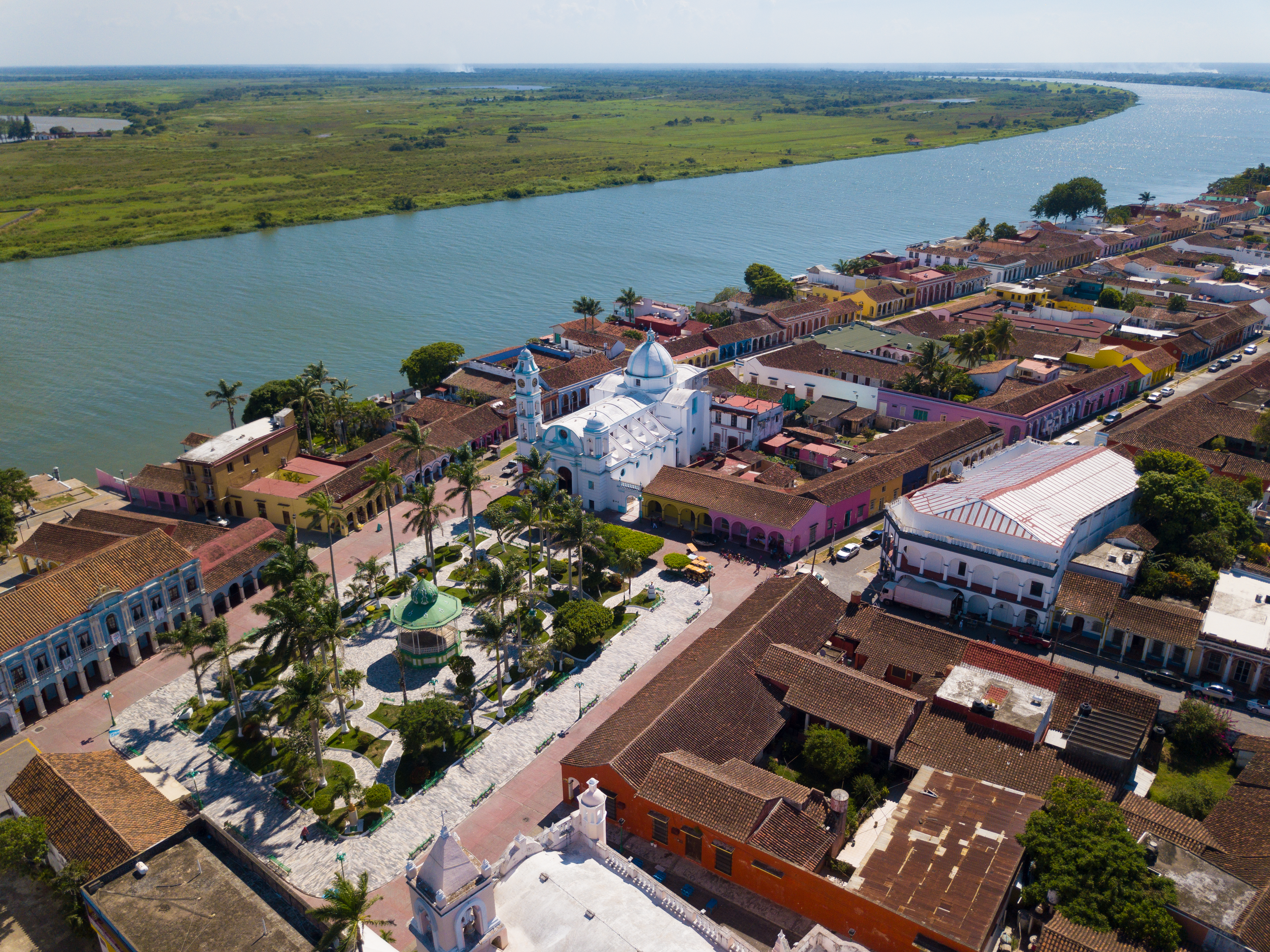

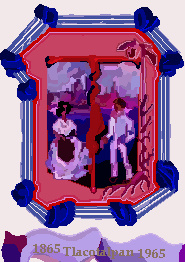
- Coat of arms

- Location within Veracruz Location within Mexico
- Coordinates: 18°37′N 95°40′W
- Country: Mexico
- State: Veracruz
- Region: Papaloapan
- Municipal seat: Tlacotalpan

Government
  - Mayor: Luis Medina Aguirre (Independent)

Area
  - Total: 646.51 km^{2} (249.62 sq mi)
- Elevation: 10 m (33 ft)

Population (2005)
  - Total: 13,845
  - Density: 21.415/km^{2} (55.465/sq mi)
- (municipality)
- Time zone: UTC-6 (CST)

Tlacotalpan is a municipality located in the eastern coastal region of the Mexican state of Veracruz. It covers a total surface area of 646.51 km^{2} (250 sq mi), accounting for 0.89% of the state total. The municipal seat is the city of Tlacotalpan, Veracruz, a UNESCO World Heritage Site.

== Geography ==
Tlacotalpan borders the municipalities of Alvarado to the north; José Azueta and Isla to the south; Santiago Tuxtla to the southeast; Lerdo de Tejada and Saltabarranca to the east; and Acula and Amatitlán to the West.

The municipality is drained by the San Juan and Tuxpan rivers, which are tributaries of the larger Papaloapan River.

== The municipality ==
The town of Tlacotalpan served as the local government for 143 other communities, which cover a territory of 577.59 km^{2} (223.01 sq mi). The municipal government includes a president, a syndic the five representatives called regidors. Of these communities, only the seat of the municipality is classified as urban; the rest are rural. The seat also contains almost all of the population of the municipality, followed by Boca de San Miguel with 394 people, Pérez y Jiménez with 374, San Francisco los Cocos with 347 and Las Amapolas with 216. The municipality borders that of Alvarado, Lerdo de Tejada and Isla.

== Socioeconomics and culture ==
The municipality is classed by the federal government with having a medium level of economic marginalization, with 56.6% of the population living in poverty and 14.1% living in extreme poverty. The main economic activities are tourism and fishing, with 28.4% working in fishing and agriculture, 18.9% in industry and handcrafts, and 50.9% working in tourism, commerce and services.

Local fisherman generally work in the municipality area, with some traveling as far as Alvarado to open ocean. Catches include sea bass, chuchumite, mojarra, crabs, shrimp and crayfish. Some agriculture takes place, with the main crops being sugar cane, corn and beans, but also including almonds, peanuts, coconuts, bananas, pineapple and guava. Livestock is almost entirely cattle with some pigs and goats.

Traditional handcrafts include cedar furniture, especially chairs with woven backs, along with musical instruments.

There are 79 schools which all but seven serving preschool and primary school students. There are three high schools, one university level campus and one teachers' college. The illiteracy rate is 14.5%.

One of the main tourism draws for the municipality are its festivals, especially that for Our Lady of Candlemas. All of the traditional celebrations of the municipality include traditional music such as the fandango and son jarocho, "mojigangas" (large puppet-like figures made from cartonería), traditional dishes such as those made from "jolote" (a local catfish), duck, tismiche (fish larvae), turtle and other fish as well as the "torito" an alcoholic beverage in flavors such as peanut, guava and coconut.

By far the most important annual event honors Our Lady of Candlemas, a Virgin Mary image which has its own Sanctuary in the town. The official feast day of this image is February 2, but celebrations last from January 31 to February 9. One important event related to this celebration is the La Cabalgata, a parade of couples in traditional dress on horseback. There is also a running of bulls similar to that of Pamplona. The image travels in procession across the Papaloapan.

Other important annual events include the Tlacotalpan Carnival in early May, the feast honoring the patron saint of the San Miguelito neighborhood from September 26–29 and the "Rama" starting December 16, when groups of youths wander the streets singing holiday songs with improvised verses.

== Demographics ==
The 2005 INEGI census reported a population of 13,845. Speakers of indigenous languages were few, numbering only 42 (predominantly Zapotec).

Population centres in the municipality include:

- Tlacotalpan, the municipal seat, with 8006 inhabitants
- Boca de San Miguel (391 inhabitants)
- Pérez y Jiménez (369)
- Las Amapolas (231)
- Linda Vista (170)
