= Ignacio de la Llave =

Mexican politician (1818–1863)

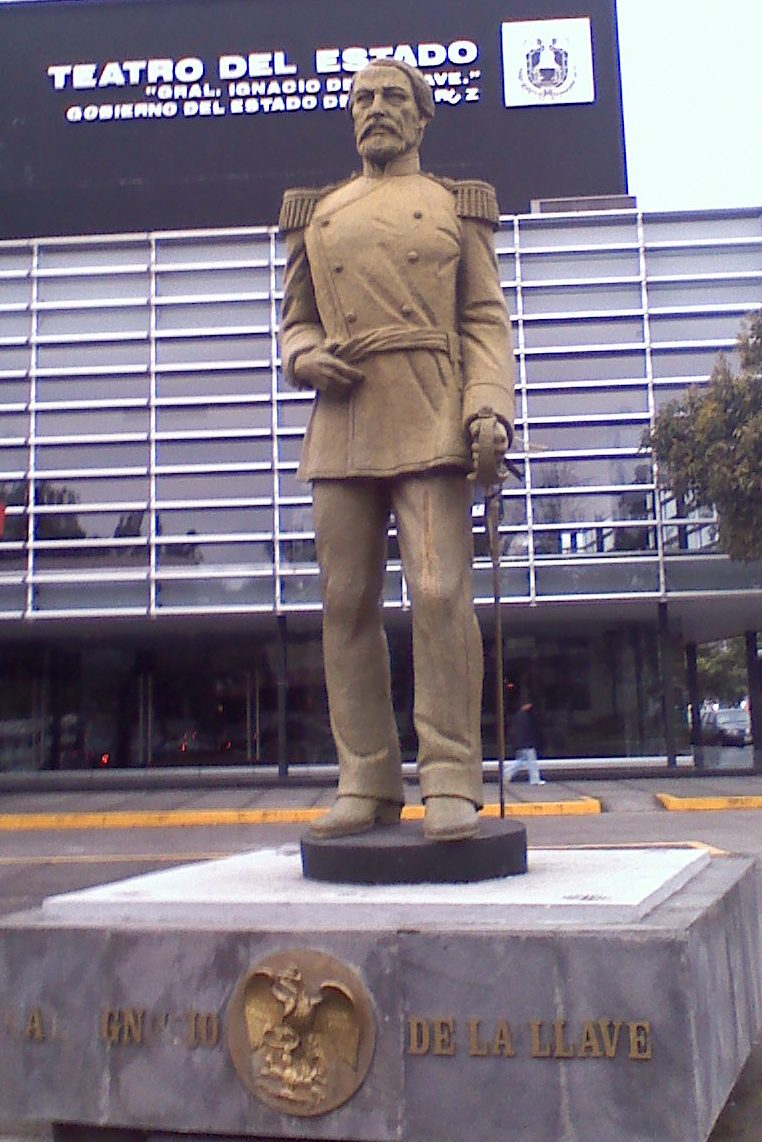
- Statue of Ignacio de La Llave in Xalapa

Governor of Veracruz
- In office 27 June 1861 – 4 July 1862
- Preceded by: Fernando J. Corona
- Succeeded by: José Juan Landero y Cos
- In office 26 August 1855 – 2 November 1855
- Preceded by: Antonio Corona
- Succeeded by: Juan Soto Ramos

7th Minister of the Interior
- In office 1 February 1857 – 17 June 1857
- President: Ignacio Comonfort
- Preceded by: José María Lafragua
- Succeeded by: Jesús Terán Peredo

Personal details
- Party: Liberal
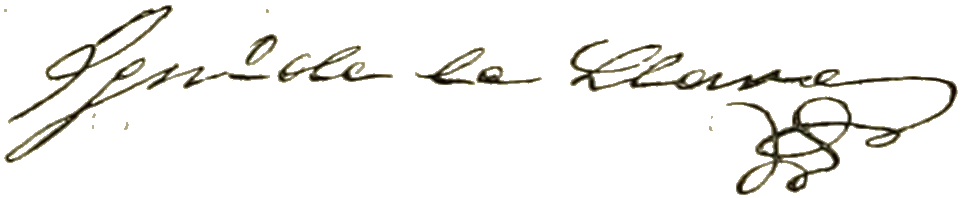
- Signature

Ignacio de la Llave y Segura Zevallos (26 August 1818 – 23 June 1863) was a general and the governor of the Mexican state of Veracruz (1861–1862).

== Life ==
He was born in Orizaba, Veracruz, a nephew of the prominent politician Pablo de la Llave. He participated in the Mexican–American War, in the 1851 revolution against Antonio López de Santa Anna, in the Reform War (against the conservatives), and (on the nationalist side) against the usurper Maximilian of Mexico. He died as a result of battle injuries sustained in 1863 in the aftermath of the Siege of Puebla.

== Honors ==
There is a municipality of Ignacio de la Llave in the state of Veracruz, named after him. In 1932, it was renamed from San Cristóbal de la Llave.

Also, the state of Veracruz was known as Veracruz-Llave from 1863 to 2004, and since 2004, it has been officially known as Veracruz de Ignacio de la Llave.

Preceded by Manuel Gutiérrez Zamora	Governor of Veracruz; 1861–1862	Succeeded by Francisco Hernández y Hernández
