= Otatitlán =

- Town and municipality
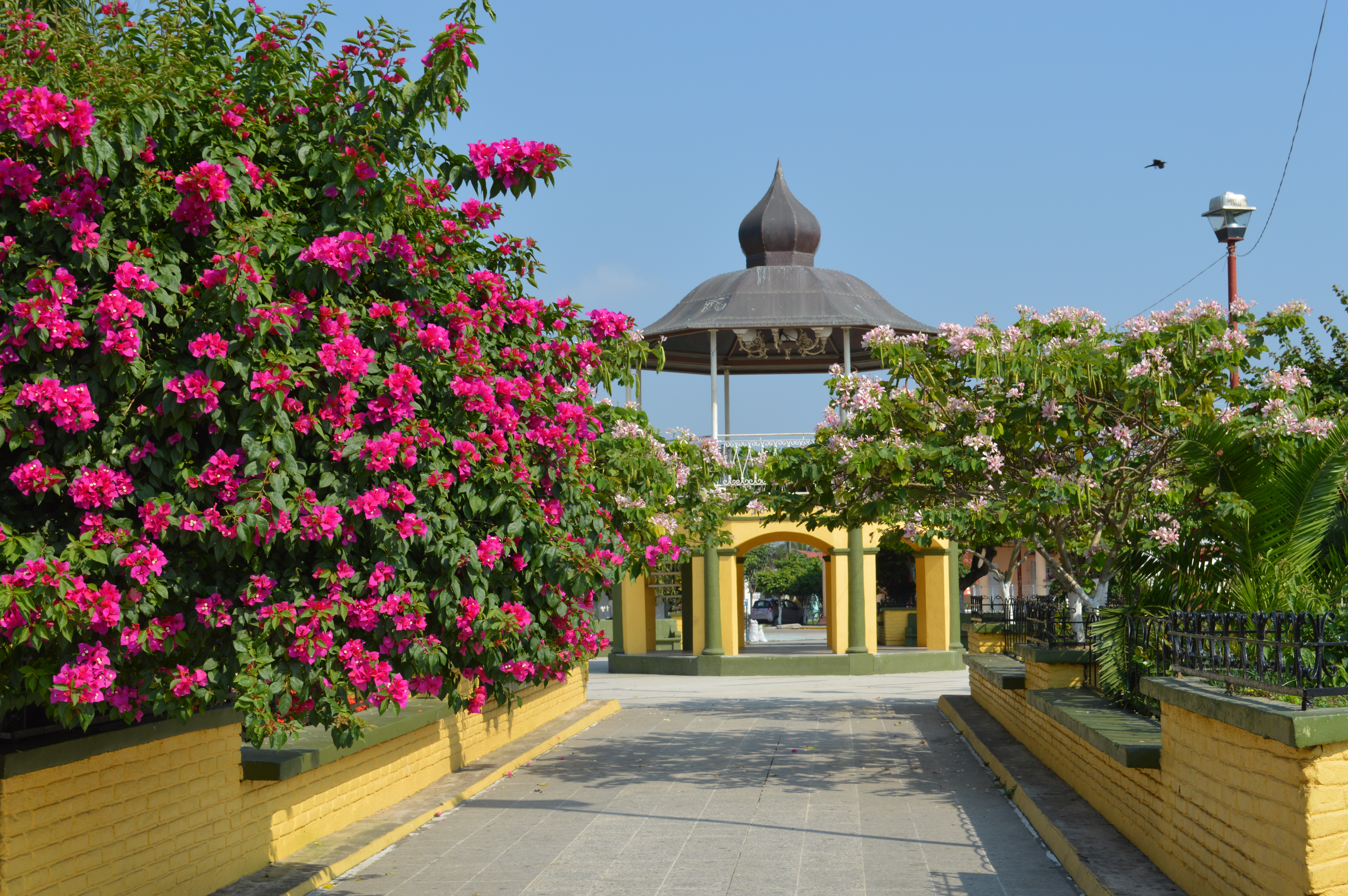
- Main plaza and kiosk
- Interactive map of Otatitlán
- Coordinates: 18°10′38″N 96°2′3″W
- Country: Mexico
- State: Veracruz
- Region: Papaloapan

Government
  - Mayor: Jorge Guerrero García

Area
  - Total: 53.46 km^{2} (20.64 sq mi)
- Elevation: 10 m (33 ft)

Population (2010)
  - Total: 4,659 (town) 5,250 (municipality)
- Time zone: UTC-6 (Central Standard Time)
- Area code: 287

Otatitlán is a town and municipality in the Mexican state of Veracruz, in the south of the state along the border with the state of Oaxaca. The town is best known for its large black image of a crucified Christ, one of three notable images of this type. Most of the population in Otatitlán is poor and the area is dedicated to agriculture, especially sugar cane and bananas.

== The town ==
The town of Otatitlán is about 180 km south of the state capital, near the state's border with Oaxaca. All but a couple hundred of the municipality's population lives here. It is centered on a large plaza surrounded by wide streets. The main church is San Andrés, which contains the image of the Cristo Negro, or Black Christ that the town is noted for.

Traditional music and dance of Otatitlán include Son Jarocho and Danzón. Traditional dishes include machuco (plantains fried with green chile and garlic) and tapistes, a dish with plantains, chicken, acuyo (Piper auritum), tomato and chili pepper.

== The municipality ==
As a municipality, the town of Otatitlán is the local government for thirty other communities, which combined have a territory of 53.46 km^{2}. The municipality borders those of Cosamaloapan and Tlacojalpan with the state of Oaxaca to the south. The municipal government consists of a municipal president, a syndic and one representative for the other communities.

The municipality is rural with a population density of 104.8 people/km^{2}, with only the seat considered urban. Outside the seat the only communities of any size are El Peladiente (pop. 111), Jesus Urueta (pop. 90), La Conchita (pop. 72) and La Isleta (pop. 58). Only 210 people are considered to live in indigenous households, where the head speaks an indigenous language. Only 81 speak an indigenous language, of which Mazateco dominates.

The municipality has eight schools - two preschools, four primary schools, one middle school and one high school - with an illiteracy rate of 11.8%. It also has 16 km of federal highway.

== Black Christ of Otatitlán ==
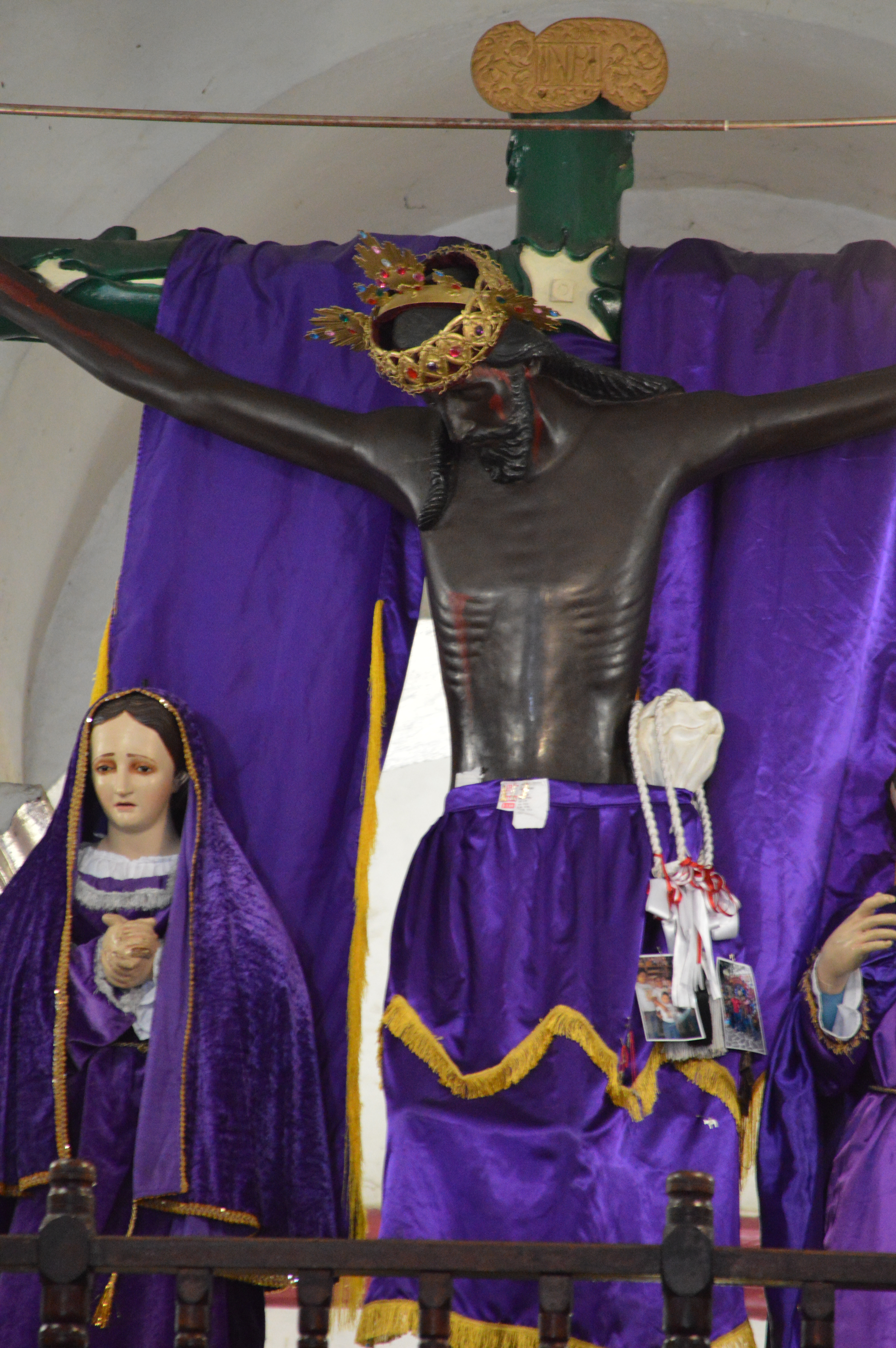
The "Black Christ" of Otatitlán

Otatitlán is best known for a large image of a crucified Christ which is black, known as a "Cristo Negro" or Black Christ. It is one of three well known images of this type, with the others in Chalma, State of Mexico and Esquipulas, Guatemala.

There are two stories of the origin of this particular image. One states the Spanish king Philip II had the three Black Christ images commissioned, which then went on to their current locations. Another story says that the image was found on the Day of the Cross by an indigenous person at the foot of a tree in the village of Puctlanzingo, which was then claimed by the Mazatecos of the region. Later it was moved on the Papaloapan River on a raft to its current location.

According to researcher Carlos Navarrete, the phenomenon of "Black Christ" images follows known Aztec merchant (pochteca) routes. It is possible that these images were a substitution for the deity Yacatgecutli, the god of commerce, which was also black.

During the Cristero War in the 1930s, the image was taken by men allied with then governor of Veracruz, Adalberto Tejada, who tried unsuccessfully to burn it. Instead it was decapitated. The headless image returned to Otatitlán and a replacement was made. In 1950, the original head was found and returned, with the replacement head now kept in a glass case.

The devotion to this image is a syncretism. It is not unusual for there to be a mass followed by a ritual cleansing by a local "brujo" (roughly witch doctor). The major feast day for this image is 3 May, Day of the Cross, with events beginnings on 28 April and extending to 7 May. The event can attract up to 150,000 people from Veracruz and other parts of Mexico.

== Geography ==
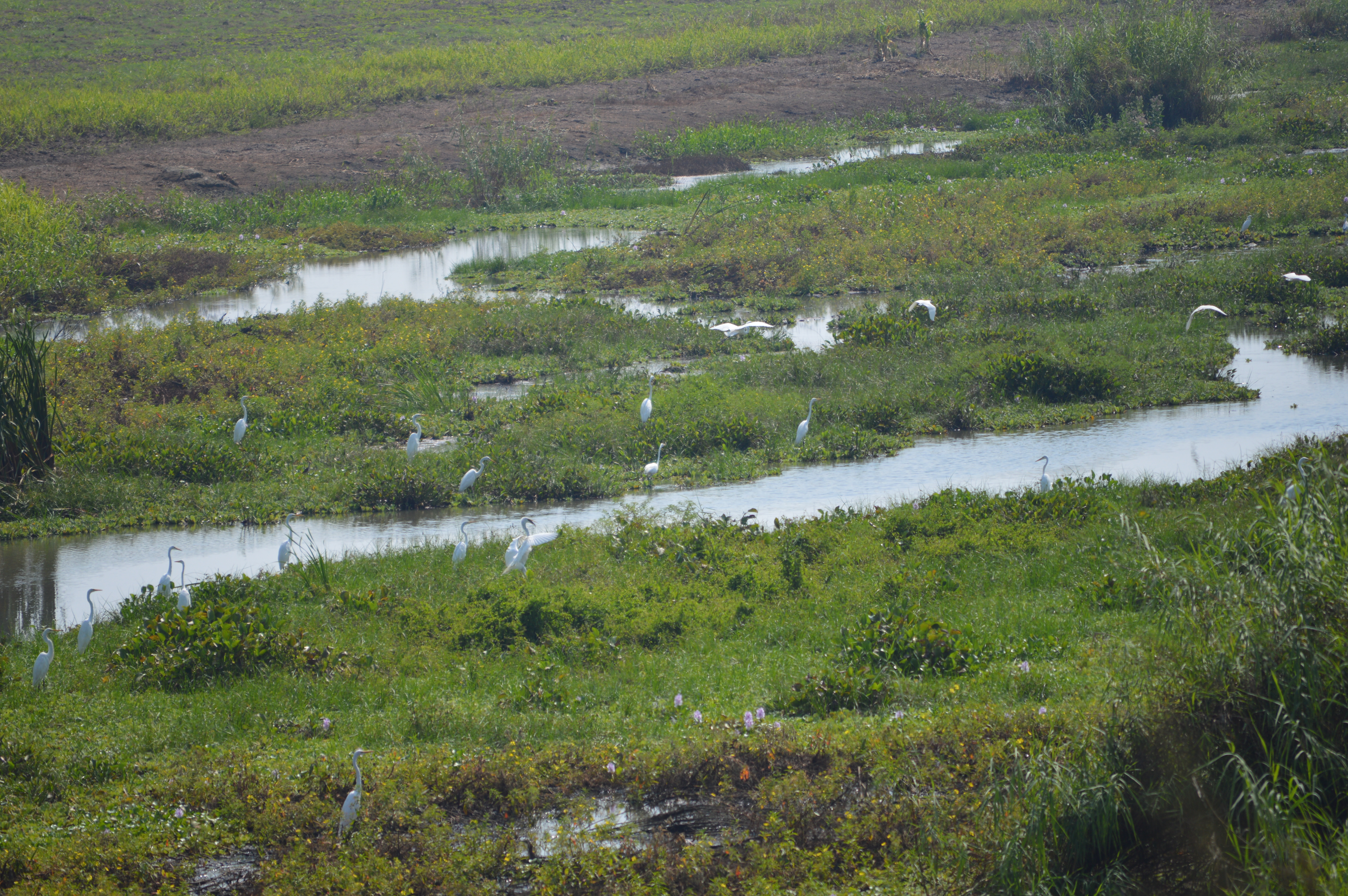
irrigation canal with egrets

The area of the Otatitlán town is flat with a few small hills and an average altitude of ten meters above sea level. The soil is loose and susceptible to erosion. The territory is defined by the Papaloapan River, with the only other river of note, the Obispo, a tributary.

=== Climate ===
In 84% of the municipality, the climate is warm and mostly moist with rains in the summer. In the rest it is warm and very moist with very abundant rain in the summer. Average annual temperature is between 24 and 26C with the average annual rainfall varying between 1900 and 2100mm.

=== Flora and fauna ===
The wild vegetation here was high and medium tropical forest, but today almost all of the territory (45.9 km^{2}) is dedicated to agriculture, 2.8 km^{2} is covered by water and 1.4 km^{2} is urban. Wildlife includes rabbits, coatis, raccoons, coyotes, doves, parrots, egrets and various reptiles.

== Socioeconomics ==
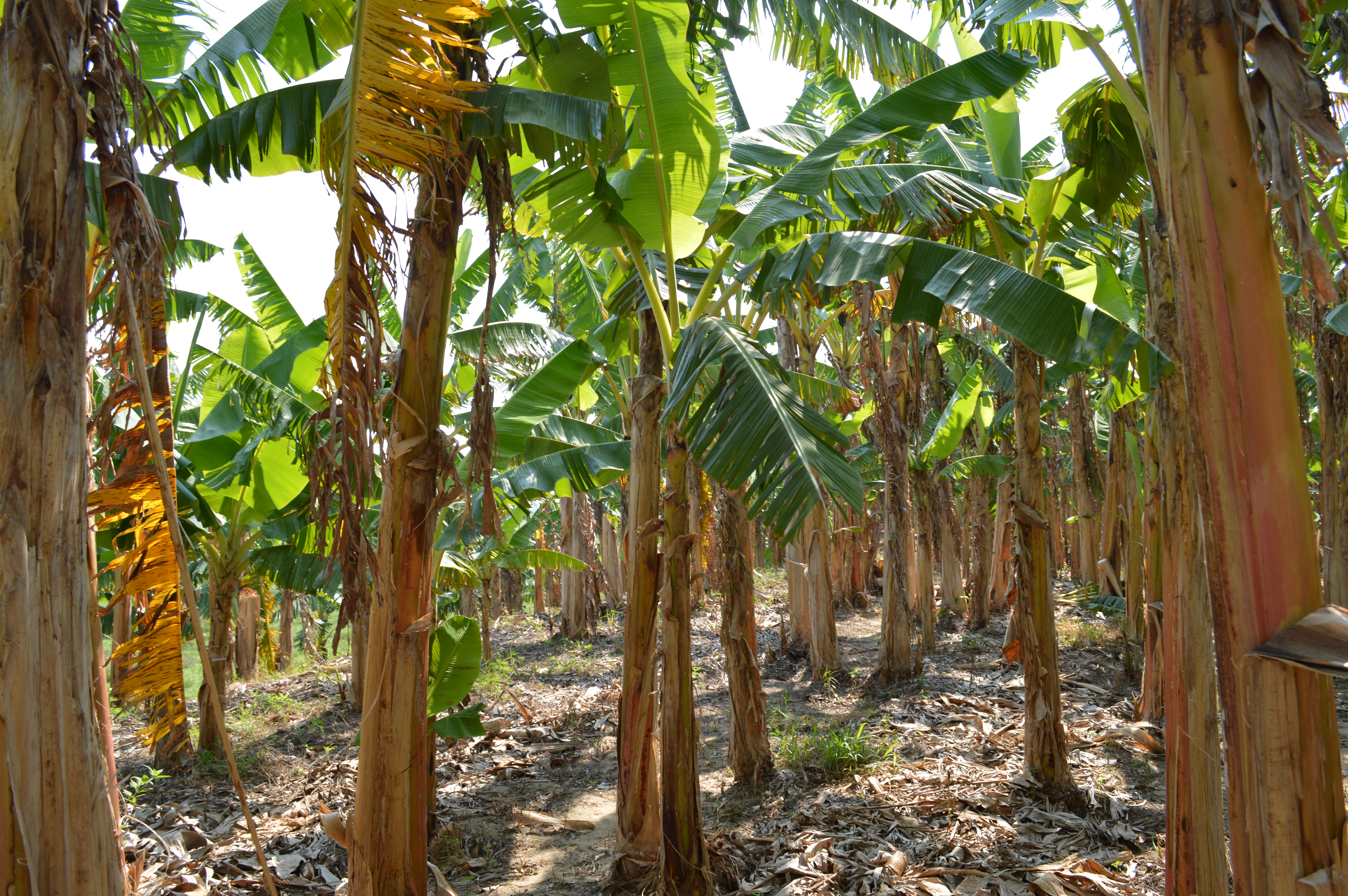
Banana trees in the municipality

The municipality is rural with 32.2% of the workforce involved in agriculture and livestock, 18.8% in industry (mostly sugar cane processing) and 48.8% in commerce and services. It is poor with 61.4% of the population under the poverty line and 12.1% living in extreme poverty. However, because of the availability of schools, medical care, running water, electricity, the area is considered to have only a medium level of socioeconomic marginalization.

Main crops are sugar cane, bananas and corn. Livestock is split between cattle and pigs, followed by domestic fowl and sheep.

== History ==
The name "Otatitlán" comes from Nahuatl and means "place of the otates (Mexican weeping bamboo)," given by traveling merchants when the Aztecs reached here. The pre Hispanic population was Popoluca, which changed to Mazateco during the colonial period. From the pre Hispanic into the colonial period, it was a trading post for the indigenous population.

Jesuit missionaries founded the mission of San Ignacio Otatitlan.

The town itself was founded by the Marquis of Guadalcazar, Diego Fernández de Córdoba, dedicated to the Apostle Andrew. The village gained municipality status in 1831, bordering Tlacojalpan, Tuxtepec, Tsochoacan and Las Lomas. Otatitlán was officially recognized as a town in 1958 and its coat of arms approved in 1985.
