= Saltabarranca =

Municipality in the Mexican state of Veracruz

- Municipality
- Location in Mexico Saltabarranca (Mexico)
- Country: Mexico
- State: Veracruz
- Demonym: (in Spanish)
- Time zone: UTC−6 (CST)

Saltabarranca is a municipality located in the south zone of the Mexican state of Veracruz, about 180 kilometres (110 mi) from the state capital Xalapa. It has an area of 91.3 km^{2} (35.3 sq mi). It is located at 18°22′N 95°48′W.

The origin of the name of this existing municipality is not known from the creation of the State of Veracruz (1824).

== Geography ==
The municipality of Saltabarranca is delimited to the north by Lerdo de Tejada to the east by Angel R. Cabada, to the south and west by Tlacotalpan. There is watered by the rivers San Juan, Ingenio and others, which are tributaries of the Papaloapan river, being outlined the renowned San Agustín and the Tecolapan.

The weather in Saltabarranca is warm and wet all year with rains in summer and autumn.

== Agriculture ==
It produces principally maize, beans, sugarcane, watermelon and green chile.

== Celebrations ==
In Saltabarranca, the celebration in honor to Virgen de la Concepción, Patron of the town, takes place in May, and the celebration in honor to Virgen de Guadalupe takes place in December.
