= Tuxtilla =

- Municipality and town
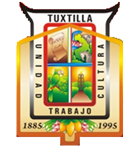
- Coat of arms

- Location in Mexico
- Coordinates: 18°14′N 95°8′W
- Country: Mexico
- State: Veracruz
- Region: Papaloapan
- Municipality: Tuxtilla

Area
  - Total: 168.62 km^{2} (65.10 sq mi)

Population (2005)
  - Total: 2,126
- Time zone: UTC-6 (Central Standard Time)

Tuxtilla is a municipality located in the south zone in the Mexican state of Veracruz, about 175 km from the state capital Xalapa. It has a surface of 168.62 km^{2}. It is located at 18°14′N 95°8′W. The name comes from the language Náhuatl, Tuz-Tlan.

== Geography ==
Tuxtilla is bounded by Cosamaloapan to the north, Chacaltianguis to the east and the state of Oaxaca to the south.

The weather in Tuxtilla is very warm and wet all year with rains in summer and autumn.

== Agriculture ==
It produces principally maize, beans, mango and sugarcane.

== Celebrations ==
In May, the municipality hosts a celebration to honor San Isidro Labrador, Patron of the town. In December, the town holds a celebration to honor the Virgen de Guadalupe.
