= Amatitlán (municipality) =

- City and municipal seat
- Coordinates: 18°26′N 95°44′W
- Country: Mexico
- State: Veracruz

Area
  - Total: 135 km^{2} (52 sq mi)
- Elevation: 6 m (20 ft)

Population (2020)
  - Total: 7,866

Amatitlán is a municipality in the Mexican state of Veracruz. It is located about 231 km from state capital Xalapa to the south-east. It has a surface of 169.4 km^{2}. It is located at 18°26′N 95°44′W.

== Geography ==
=== Borders ===
The municipality of Amatitlán is delimited to the north-east by Tlacotalpan, to the south-east by José Azueta, to the south-west by Cosamaloapan, to the west by Ixmatlahuacan, and to the north-west by Acula.

== Products ==
It produces maize and beans.
