= Juan Rodríguez Clara =

- City and municipal seat
- Coordinates: 18°00′N 95°24′W
- Country: Mexico
- State: Veracruz
- Region: Papaloapan Region
- Established: 1960

Government
  - Federal electoral district: Veracruz's 3rd

Area
  - Total: 995 km^{2} (384 sq mi)

Population (2020 census)
  - Total: 15,512
  - Municipality: 38,367
- Time zone: UTC-6 (Zona Centro)
- Website: http://juanrodriguezclara.gob.mx/

Juan Rodríguez Clara is a city and its surrounding municipality in the Mexican state of Veracruz. It is located in the south of the state, about 335 km from the state capital Xalapa. The municipality covers a surface are of 934.20 km^{2} and the municipal seat is located at 18°00′N 95°24′W. Formerly known as El Burro and Nopalapan de Zaragoza, the current name commemorates a local martyr to the cause of agrarianism and was adopted in 1925. The municipality was established on 22 December 1960 from land belonging to San Juan Evangelista.

The municipality of Juan Rodríguez Clara is delimited to the north by Hueyapan de Ocampo, to the east by Acayucan and San Juan Evangelista, to the south by the state of Oaxaca, and to the west by Playa Vicente and Isla.

It principally produces maize, beans, rice, watermelon, green chile, sugarcane and pineapple.

Juan Rodríguez Clara celebrates the Virgin of Guadalupe, the town's patron saint, in December.

The weather in Juan Rodríguez Clara is warm all year with rains in summer and autumn.
