= Chacaltianguis =

Municipality in Veracruz, Mexico

- Municipality
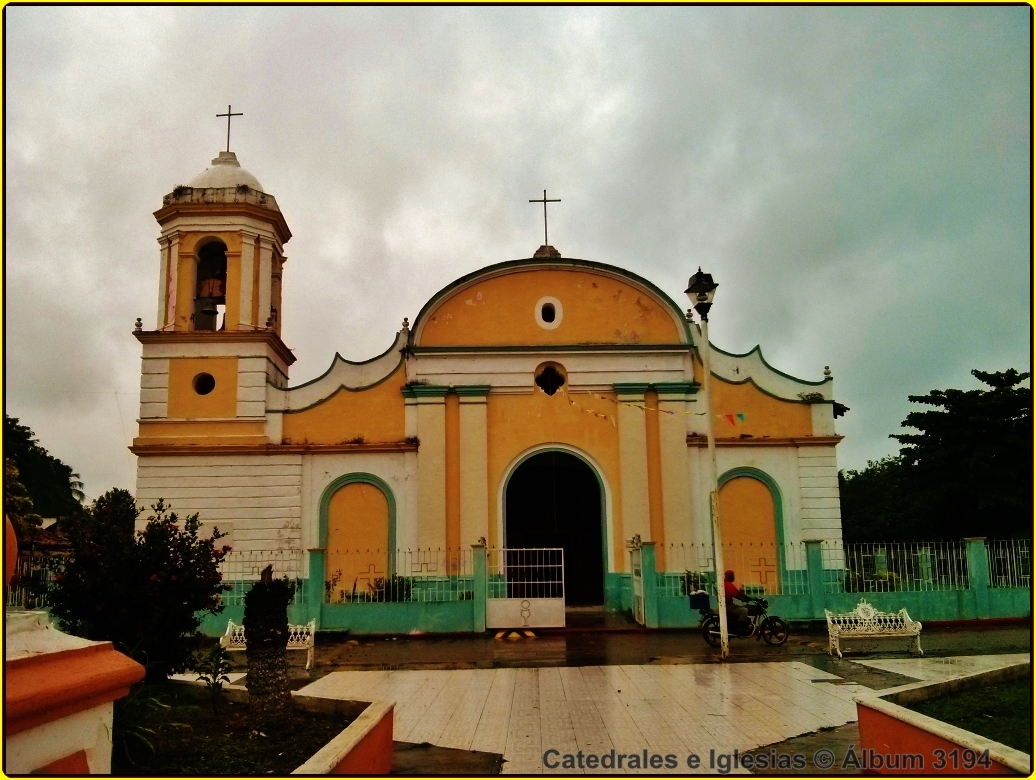

- Location in Mexico Chacaltianguis (Mexico)
- Country: Mexico
- State: Veracruz
- Demonym: (in Spanish)
- Time zone: UTC−6 (CST)

Chacaltianguis is a municipality in the Mexican state of Veracruz. It is located in the south of the state of Veracruz. It has a surface of 557.69 km^{2}. It is located at 18°18′N 95°50′W.

== Geography ==
The municipality of Chacaltianguis is delimited to the north by Cosamaloapan, to the east and south-east by José Azueta, to the west by Tuxtilla, and to the south-west by Oaxaca.

The weather in Chacaltianguis is warm all year with rain in summer.

== Economy ==
It produces principally maize and beans.

== Culture ==
In May, the celebration of the Mango festival takes place; this is the main festivity of the town.
