= Alvarado (municipality) =

- Municipality
- Municipality of Alvarado
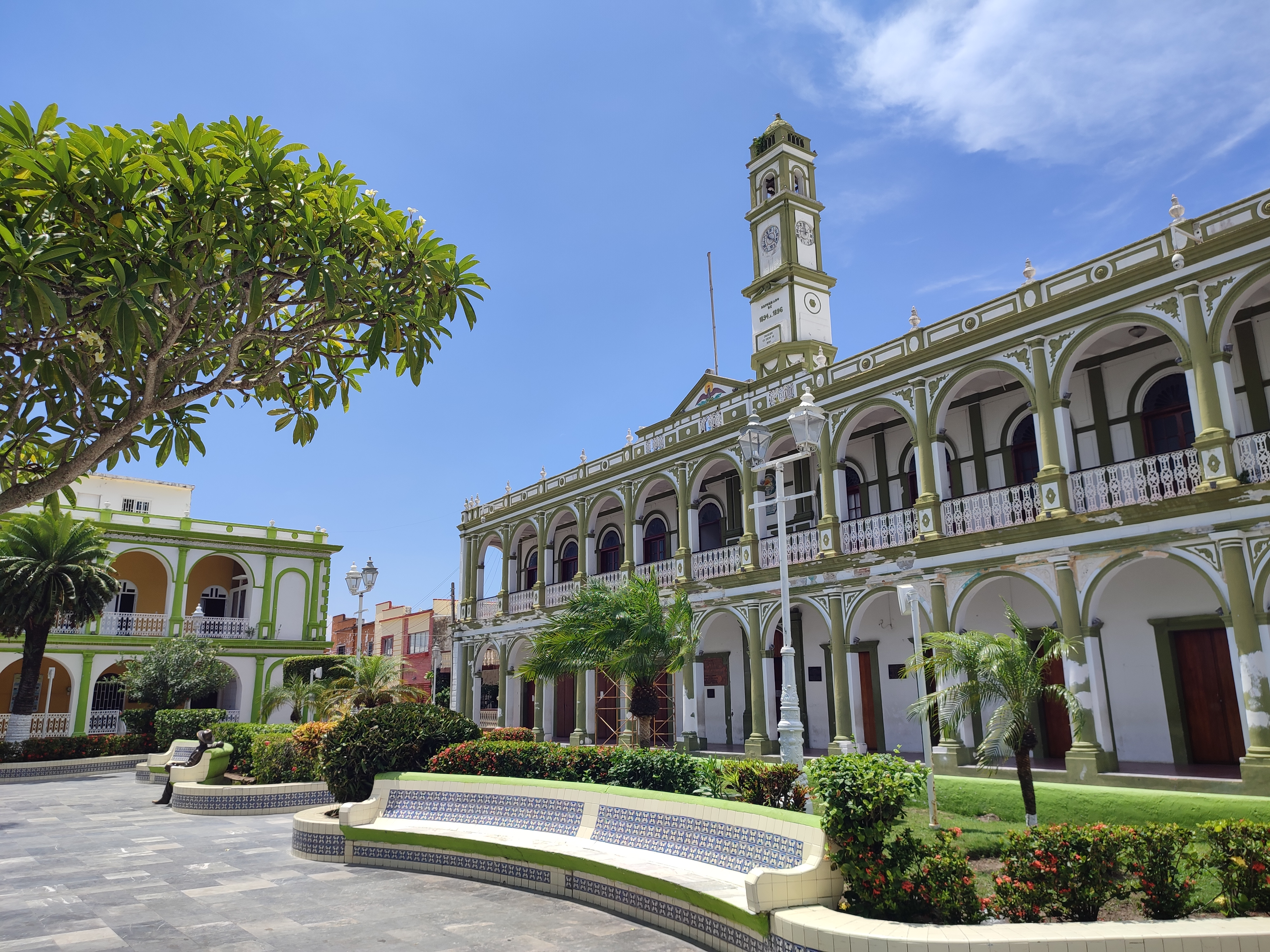
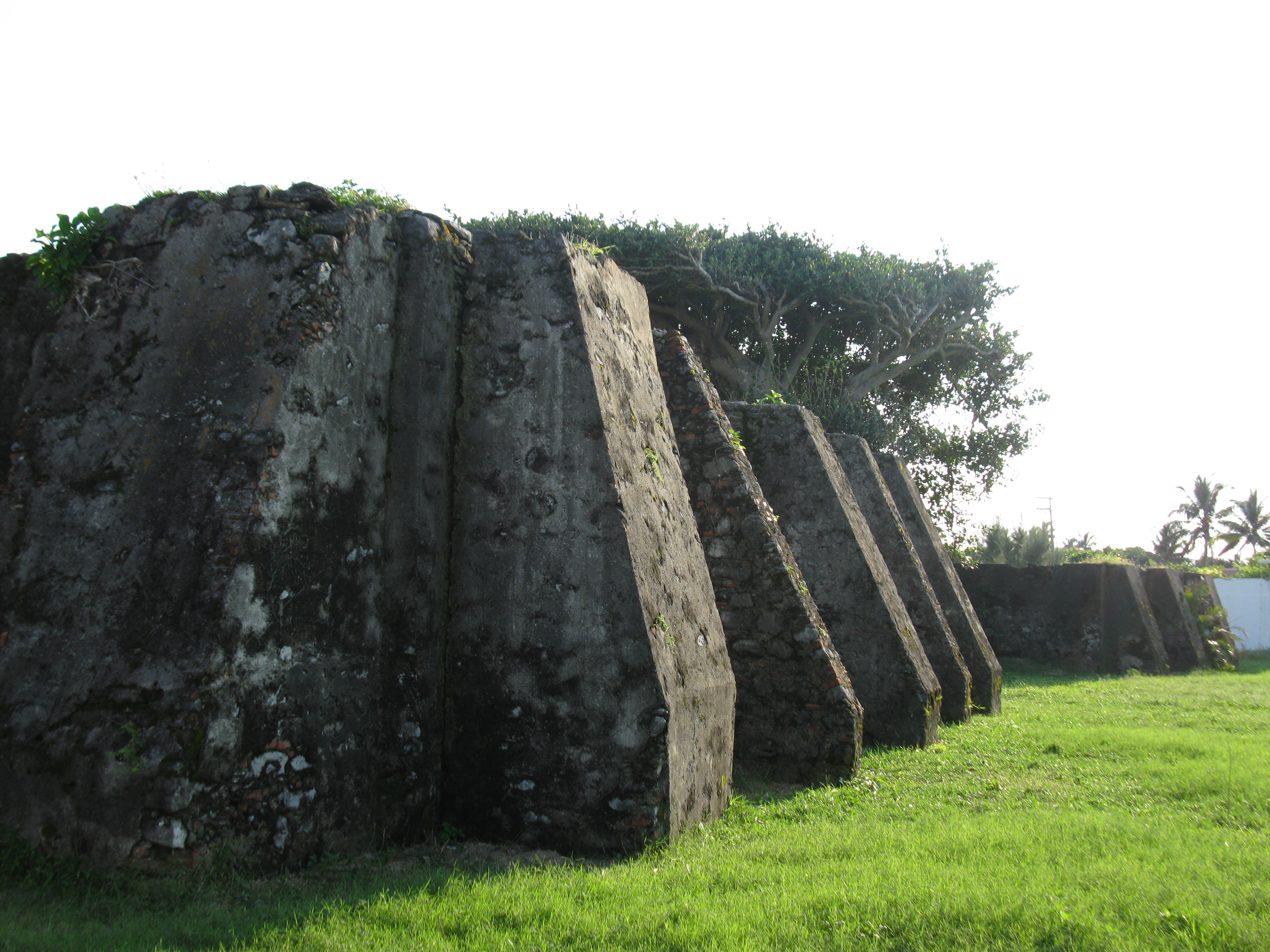
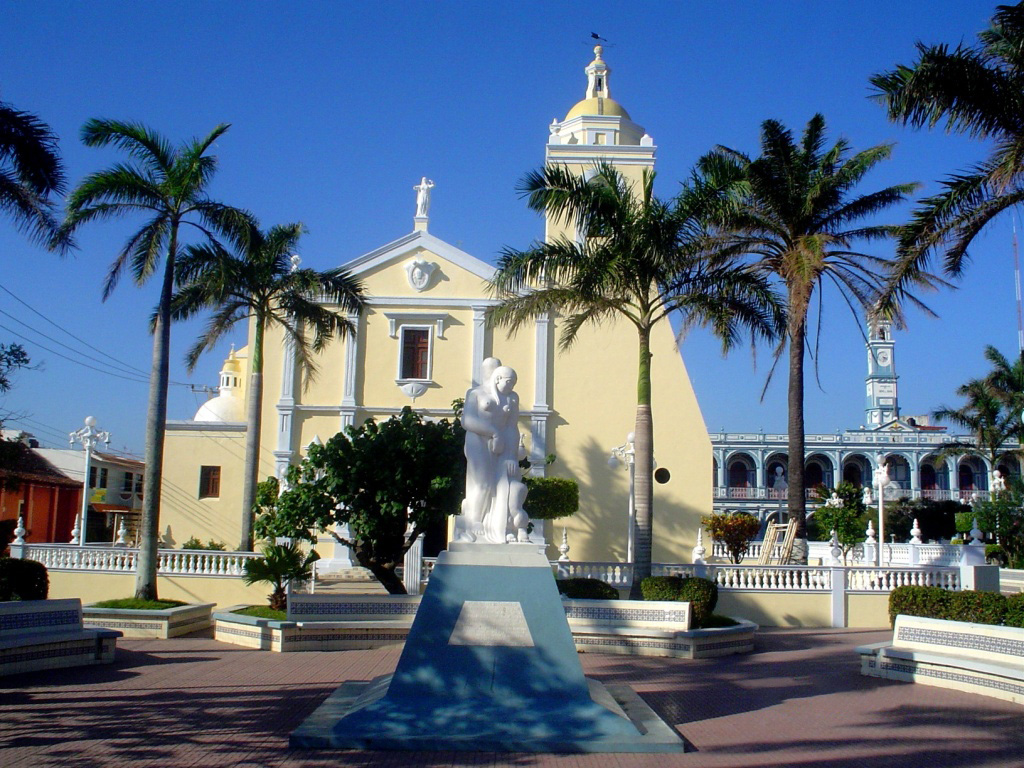
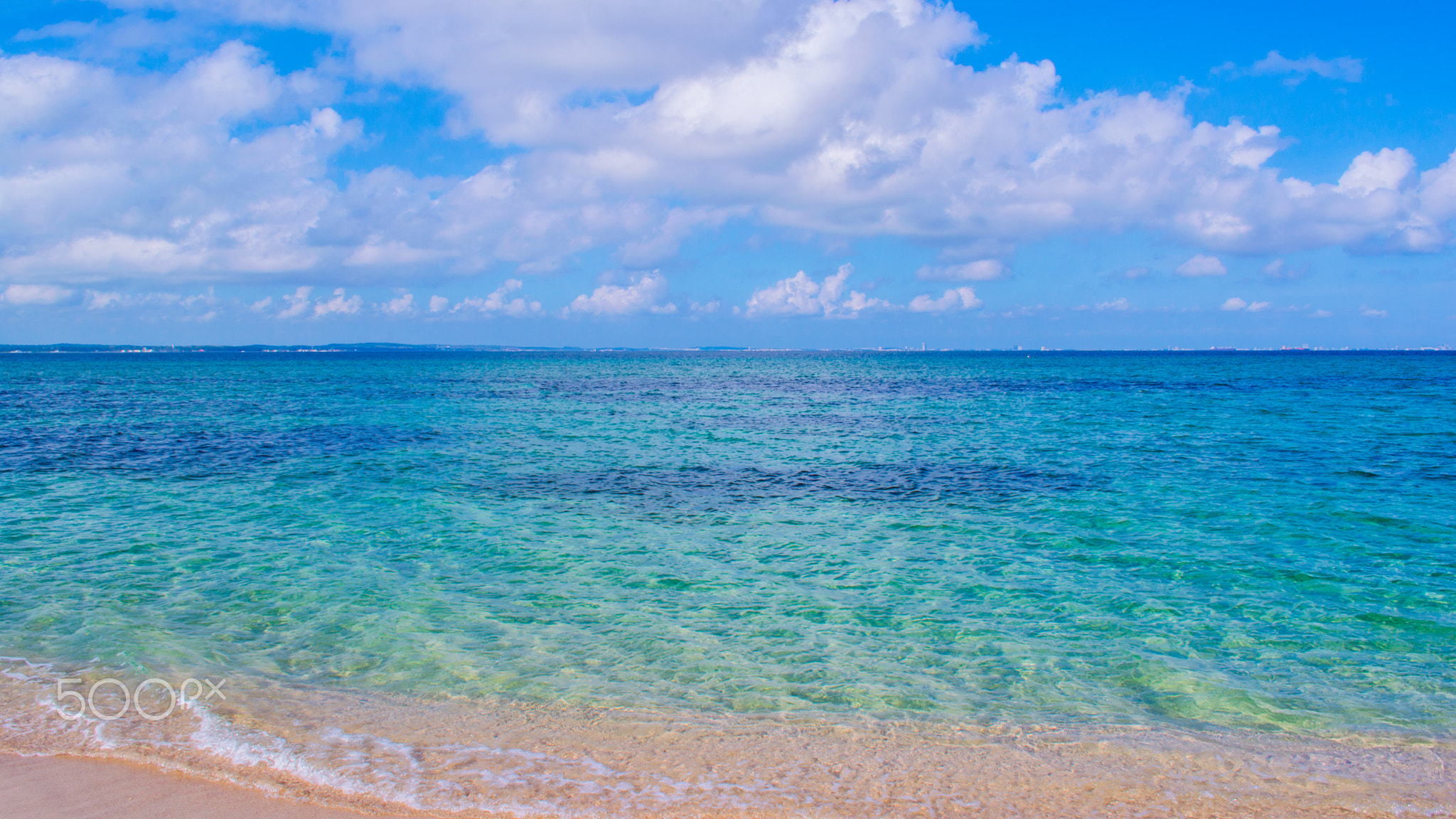
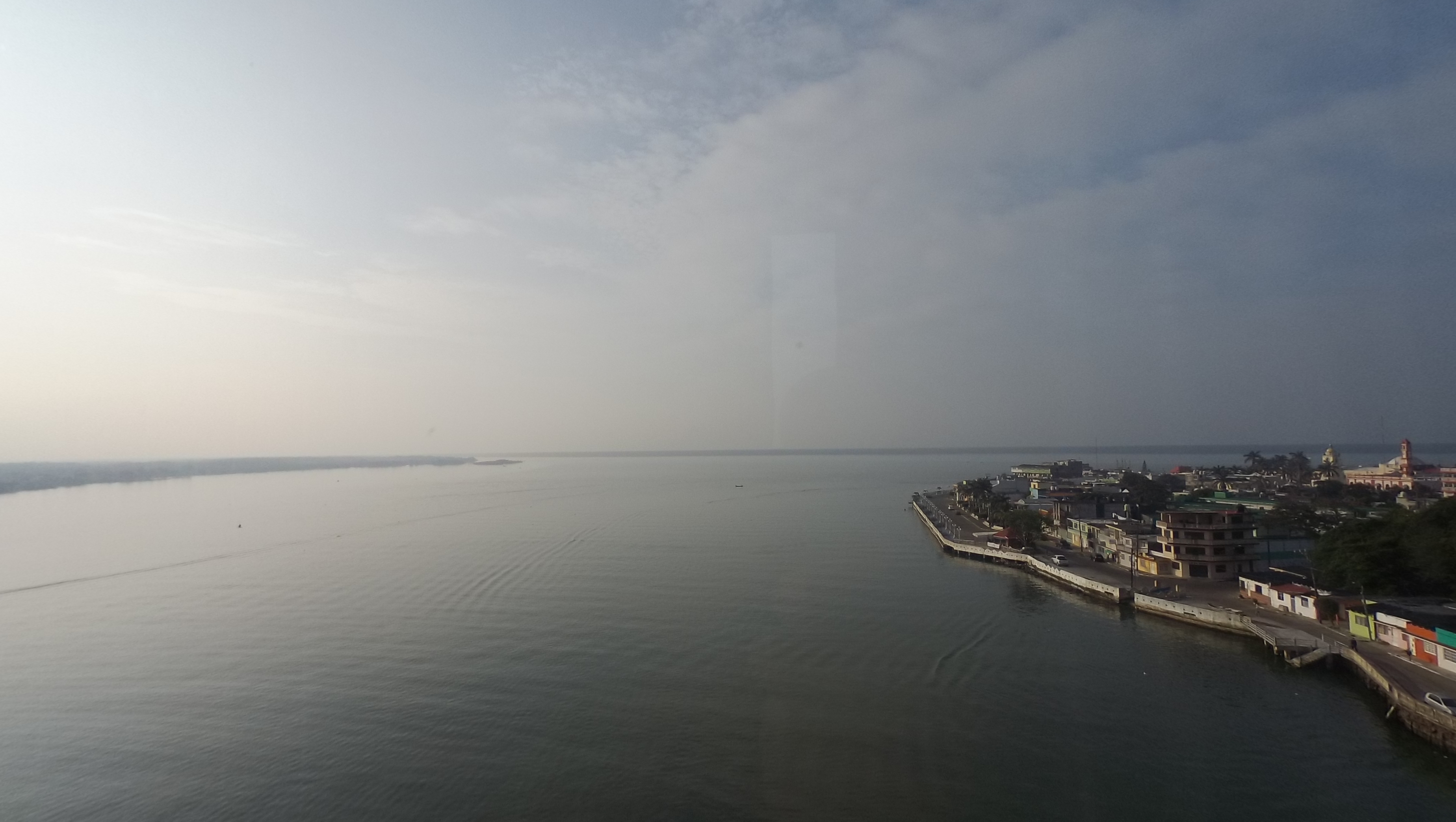
- Top: Alvarado Municipal Palace; Middle: Antón Lizardo Fort, Our Lady of the Rosary Church; Bottom: Enmedio Island, Papaloapan River

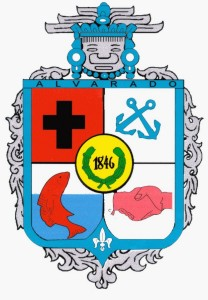
- Coat of arms
- Motto: El futuro nos une ("The future unite us")
- Municipality of Alvarado in Mexico Alvarado (Veracruz)
- Coordinates: 18°46′52″N 95°45′26″W
- Country: Mexico
- State: Veracruz
- Region: Papaloapan
- Municipal code: 011
- Established: 5 September 1818
- Incorporated: 2 August 1824
- Named for: Pedro de Alvarado
- Municipal seat: Alvarado
- Settlements: 265

Government
  - Type: Municipal Council
  - Mayor: Lizette Álvarez Vera (Morena, PVEM, PT)
  - Syndic: Jaime Abel Tiburcio Herrera
  - Regidores: Councillors: Víctor Manuel Palacios Rosas; José Manuel Herrera; Pedro Gamboa Rosas; Karina Lira Hernández; Olivia Herrera Carmona; Yeni Ivon Domínguez Alfonso; Gerardo Adrián Cano García

Area (Note: Most statistical information provided by the INEGI on its website, albeit public, does not have direct access links and it is not conspicuously displayed. Additional steps (query the database, download files, or multiple clicks) may be required to access datasets.)
  - Municipality: 826.9 km^{2} (319.3 sq mi)
  - Land: 663.9 km^{2} (256.3 sq mi)
  - Water: 163.8 km^{2} (63.2 sq mi) 19.8%
  - Urban: 4.6 km^{2} (1.8 sq mi)
  - Rural: 659.3 km^{2} (254.6 sq mi)
- Elevation: 10 m (33 ft)
- Lowest elevation (Gulf of Mexico): 0 m (0 ft)

Population (2020)
  - Municipality: 57,035
  - Density: 85.91/km^{2} (222.5/sq mi)
  - Urban: 27,081
  - Urban density: 5,900/km^{2} (15,000/sq mi)
  - Rural: 29,954
  - Rural density: 45.43/km^{2} (117.7/sq mi)
- Demonyms: Alvaradian; Spanish: Alvaradeño, -ña (formal); Jarocho, -cha (colloquial)
- Time zone: UTC-6 (CST)
- Postal codes: 95250; 95270
- Area code: 297
- Federal Highway(s): 175; 180
- Website: alvarado.gob.mx

Alvarado is a municipality in the Mexican state of Veracruz. The municipality is part of the state's Papaloapan Region and its municipal seat is established at the homonymous city of Alvarado.

== History ==
In 1816, the citizens of the village of San Cristóbal de Alvarado sought the designation of Town from Ferdinand VII, King of Spain. The King granted the village the title of Town on 8 September 1816 by Royal Decree, at a cost of 92,800 maravedís. Almost two years later, on 5 September 1818, Ferdinand VII authorized the first Honorable Ayuntamiento or city council. On 3 October 1818, the first City Council was established with Tomás Hondal serving as first Mayor.

Once the Independence War was over, the State enacted its own Constitution in which the state territory was divided in 4 departments and 12 cantons. The municipality of Alvarado was assigned to the Canton of Veracruz in the Department of Veracruz.

== Geography ==
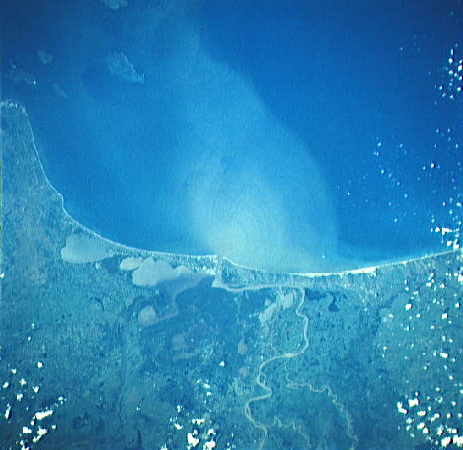
Alvarado Lagoon complex and the Papaloapan River

The municipality has an area of 826.9 km^{2} (319.3 sq mi) and an elevation of 10 m (33 ft). It is located in the state's Papaloapan region and is bordered by the municipalities of Boca del Río, Tlalixcoyan, Medellín, Ignacio de la Llave, Ixmatlahuacan, Acula, Tlacotalpan and Lerdo de Tejada.

=== Hydrography ===
The municipality is crossed by the Papaloapan and Blanco rivers, both of which drain into the Alvarado Lagoon complex.

The Alvarado Lagoon complex is formed, from north to south, by the Camaronera, Buen País, Alvarado and Tlalixcoyan lagoons.

=== Orography ===
Alvarado is located in the state's central coastal zone, within the Sotavento plains. Dunes are common in rural and urban areas; an example of this is the neighborhood of Lomas del Rosario (lit. 'Rosary Hills'), built on the Rosary dunes which are inside the city of Alvarado.

=== Climate ===
In this region there is hot/sub-humid —the wetter of the sub-humids— weather with abundant rains in summer. The maximum average temperature is 26 °C (79 °F) and 18 °C (64 °F) as minimum average temperature, varying from 5 °C (41 °F) to 7 °C (45 °F) every year. The dry season is from January to May and the period of rains starts in June. The norte (Note: A norte (lit. 'north') is, most of the time, a cold wind mass coming from the North that can reach sustained wind speeds and gusts of well over 60 km/h (37 mph). Nortes can last from a couple of hours to several days.) season starts in November and intensifies in January.

== Infrastructure ==
=== Roads ===
The municipality is connected mainly through two Mexican Federal Highways and a few state and municipal roads.

- Highway 180 covers much of the municipality from north to south, connecting Alvarado with the municipalities of Medellín and Boca del Río to the north, and Lerdo de Tejada to the south. Prior to the building of the Alvarado toll bridge in the 1960s, ferries were used at the Papaloapan River's mouth to cross the river.
- Highway 175 starts at Buenavista, at the south end of the municipality, connecting with Tlacotalpan to the west. Highway 175 passes over an upstream section of the Papaloapan River via the Tlacotalpan toll bridge.

Regarding state and municipal roads, the small network connects a few locations in the north and northwest areas of the municipality.

== Demographics ==
Historical population
Year	Pop.	±%
1995	48,490	—
2000	49,499	+2.1%
2005	48,178	−2.7%
2010	51,995	+7.9%
2015	52,927	+1.8%
2020	57,035	+7.8%

As of 2020, Alvarado had a population of 57,305 and 216 localities. The municipal seat, Alvarado is the biggest locality with a population of 20,797. Other important localities are Antón Lizardo (6,284 hab.), Lomas del Sol (2,177 hab.), Playas del Conchal (1,889 hab.) and Paso Nacional (1,828 hab.).

== Government ==
=== Municipal ===
Local government, or Ayuntamiento (English: Municipal council), is led by the Presidente municipal (English: Mayor, lit. 'municipal president') with support of the Syndic, and the Regidores (English: councillors, lit. 'regents'). The mayor is elected by popular election for a 4-year term with non-limited, non-consecutive re-elections.

=== State and Federal ===
The municipality is part of the XXIII State Electoral district and XIX Federal Electoral District.

== See also ==
- City of Alvarado
- Veracruz
