= Amapa River =

Coordinates: 18°15′30″N 96°17′14″W

Location
- Country: Mexico
- States: Oaxaca and Veracruz

Physical characteristics
- Mouth
  - location: Tonto River

The Amapa River is a river in the Mexican states of Oaxaca and Veracruz.

The river originates in the foothills of the Sierra Madre de Oaxaca in Veracruz. It flows southeastwards, forming the border between Oaxaca and Veracruz, before emptying into the Tonto River, a tributary of the Papaloapan.

== See also ==
- List of rivers of Mexico
