= Acula =

Municipality in Veracruz, Mexico

- Municipality
- Location in Mexico Acula (Mexico)
- Coordinates: 18°31′N 95°47′W
- Country: Mexico
- State: Veracruz
- Demonym: (in Spanish)
- Time zone: UTC−6 (CST)

Acula is a municipality in the Mexican state of Veracruz. It is located about 230 km south-east from the state capital of Xalapa.

== Geography ==
=== Borders ===
The municipality of Acula is delimited to the east by Tlacotalpan, to the south by the Amatitlán, to the west by the Ignacio de la Llave, and to the north by Alvarado.

== Products ==
It produces maize, rice, beans, mangos, and sugar cane.
