= Carlos A. Carrillo, Veracruz =

Municipality in Veracruz, Mexico

Carlos A. Carrillo
- Municipality
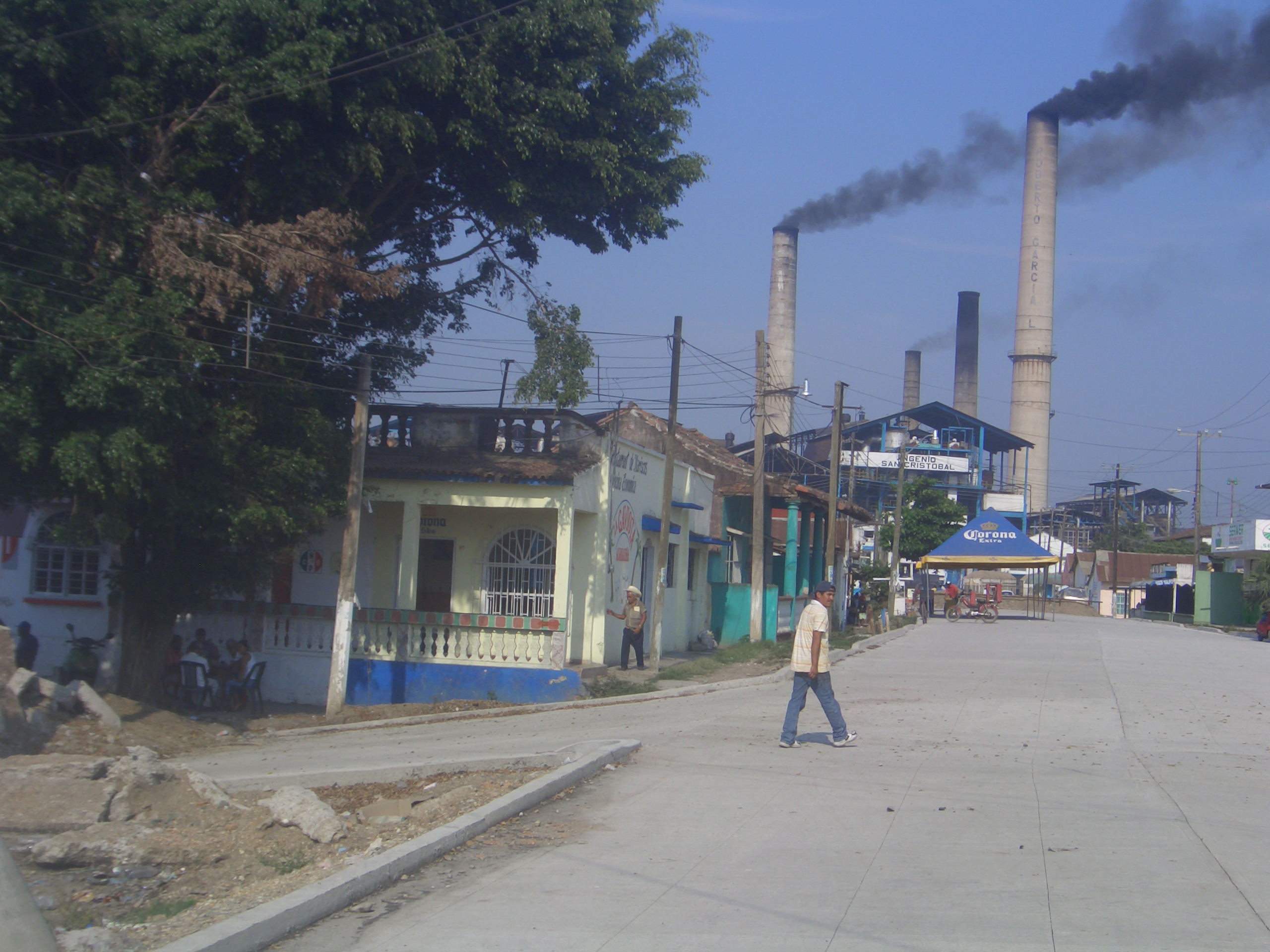

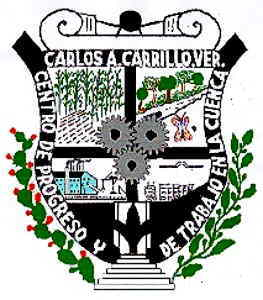
- Coat of arms

- Location in Mexico Carlos A. Carrillo (Mexico)
- Country: Mexico
- State: Veracruz
- Demonym: (in Spanish)
- Time zone: UTC−6 (CST)

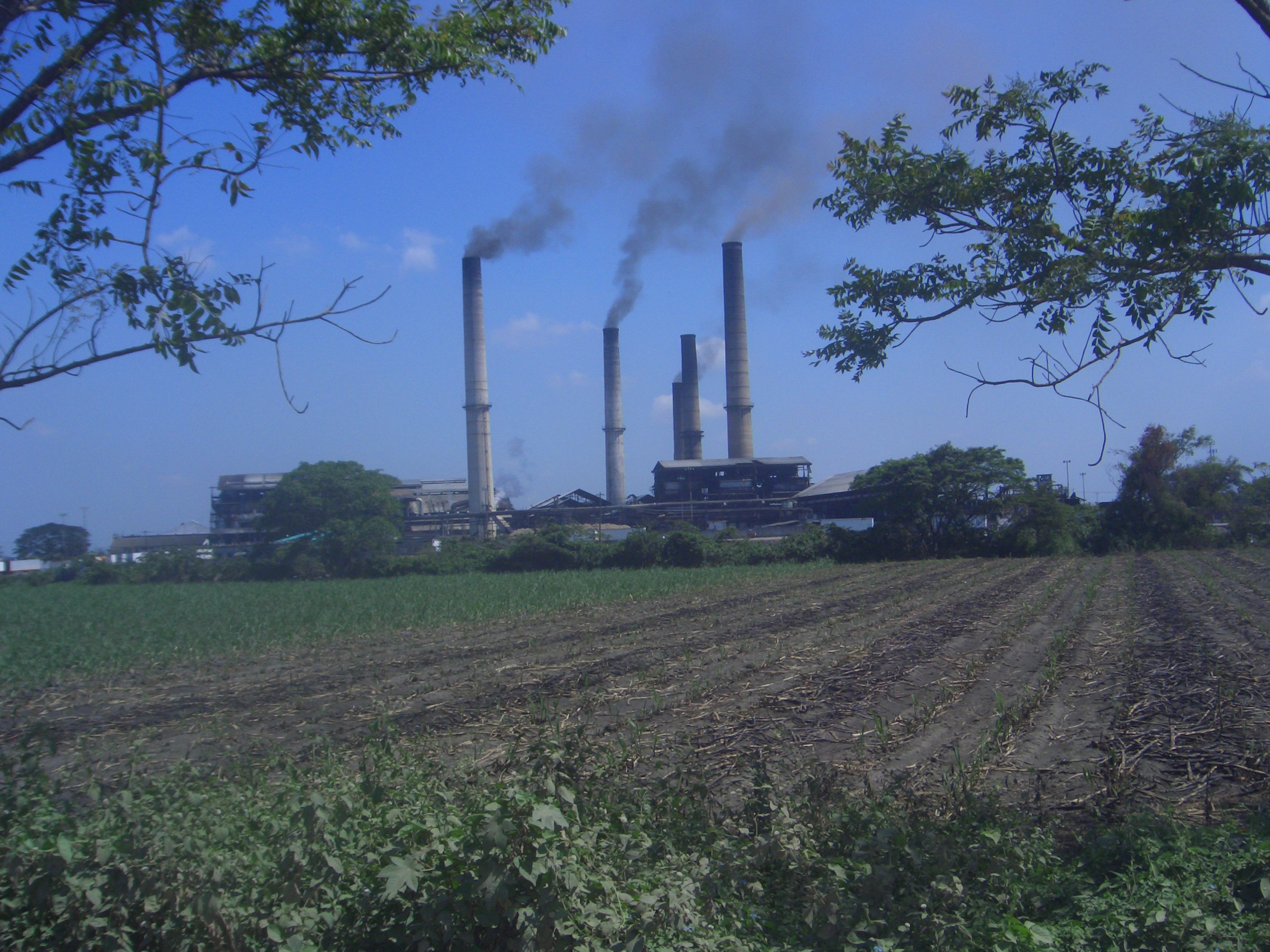
San Cristóbal Sugar Mill

Carlos A. Carrillo is a municipality in the Mexican state of Veracruz.

== Geography ==
It is located about 245 km from state capital Xalapa. It has a surface of 239.59 km^{2}. It is located at 18°22′N 95°45′W.

Carlos A. Carrillo Municipality is delimited to the north by Amatitlán Municipality, to the east by José Azueta Municipality, to the south by Chacaltianguis Municipality, to the west by Cosamaloapan Municipality and to the north-west by Ixmatlahuacan Municipality.

=== Weather ===
The weather in Carlos A. Carrillo is warm in all the year and has rains in summer and autumn.

== Products ==
It produces principally maize, beans, chili pepper, sugarcane and sweet potato.

== Events ==
In July, the town celebrates San Cristobal patron saint of the town.
