= Cosamaloapan =

City in Veracruz, Mexico

- City and municipality
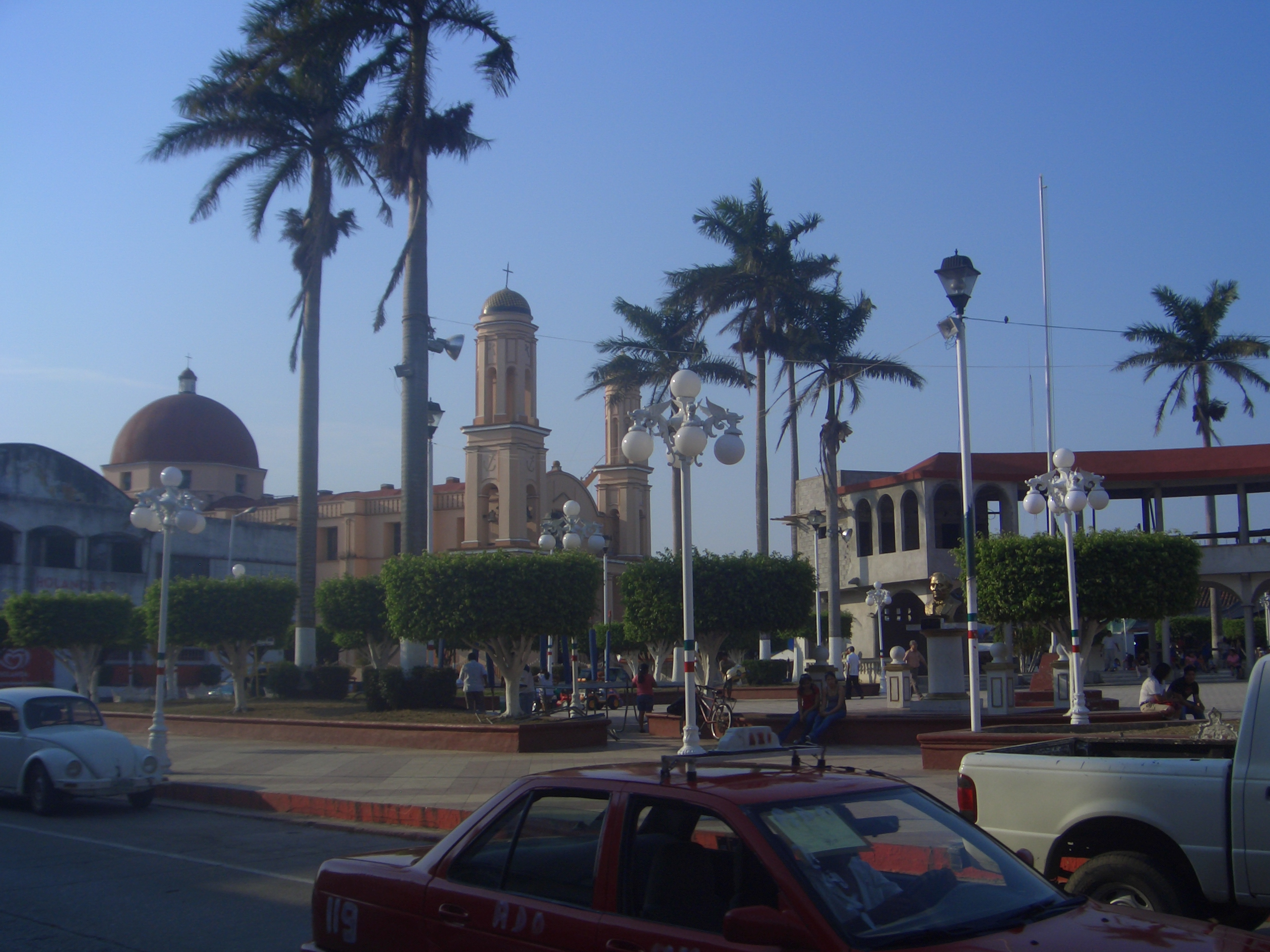
- Marcos Carrillo Herrera Park

- Location in Veracruz Cosamaloapan (Mexico)
- Coordinates: 18°22′N 95°48′W
- Country: Mexico
- State: Veracruz
- Region: Papaloapan Region (Veracruz)

Population (2020)
  - Total: 54,737

Cosamaloapan is a city and municipality located along the Papaloapan river in the central part of the Mexican state of Veracruz, about 240 km from Xalapa, the state capital. It has a surface of 323.26 km^{2}. It is located at 18°22′N 95°48′W.

The poet Manuel Carpio was born in Cosamaloapan. Cosamaloapan serves as the municipal seat of the municipality of Cosamaloapan de Carpio, which was so renamed in honour of its most famous son in 1918.

== Geography ==
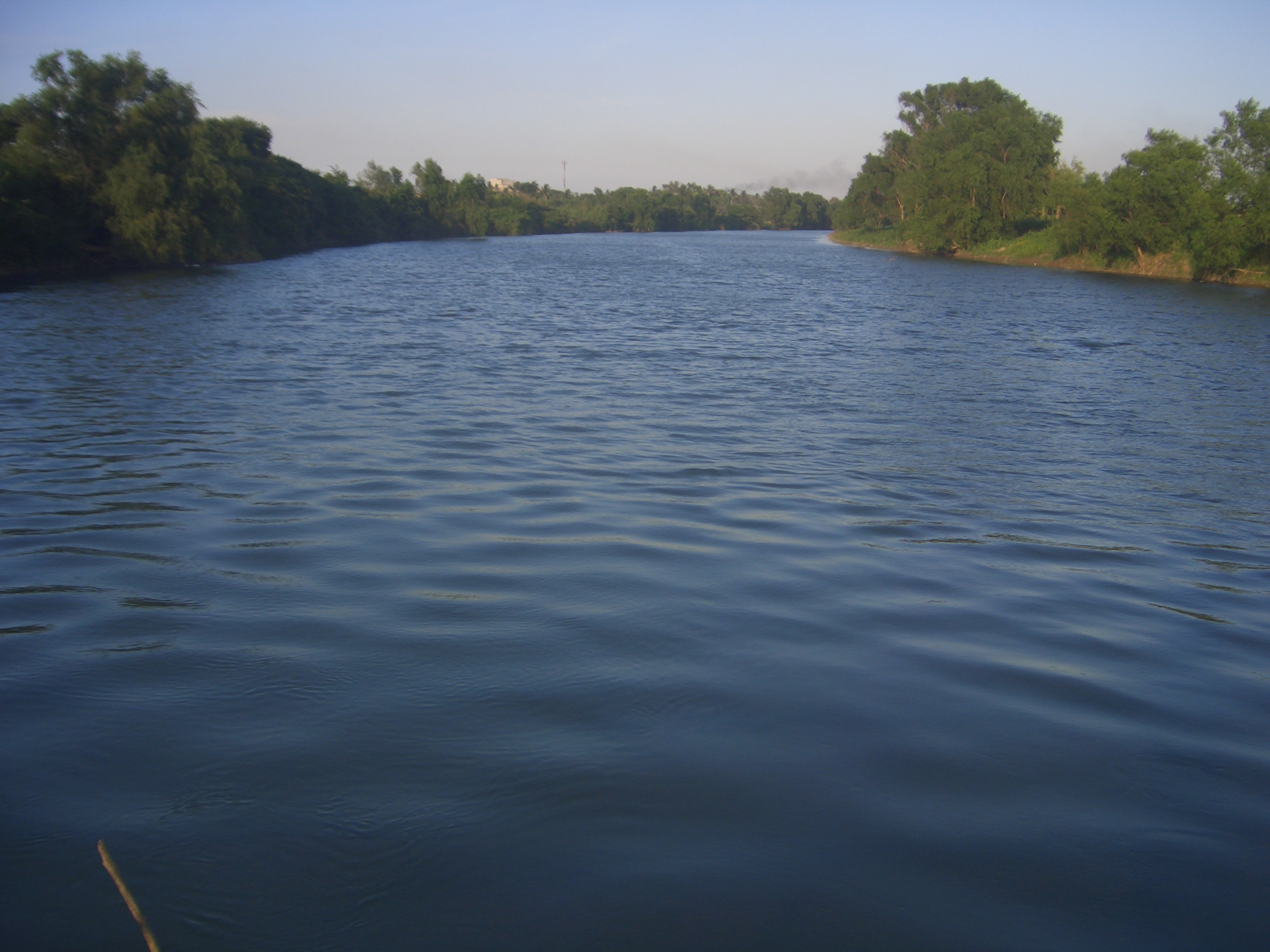
Papaloapan river in front of Cosamaloapan city

The municipality of Cosamaloapan is delimited to the north by Tierra Blanca and Ixmatlahuacan to the south by Chacaltianguis and Tuxtilla to the east by Carlos A. Carrillo and to the west by Tres Valles. It is watered by small creeks of the river Papaloapan.

The weather in Cosamaloapan is warm and wet all year with rains in summer and autumn.

== Agriculture ==
It produces principally maize, beans, sugarcane, watermelon and green chile.

== Celebrations ==
In Cosamaloapan, in May takes place the celebration in honor of the Virgen de la Concepción, Patron of the town, and in December takes place the celebration in honor of the Virgen de Guadalupe.
