= José Azueta, Veracruz =

José Azueta
- City and municipal seat
- Location in Mexico José Azueta (Mexico)
- Coordinates: 18°04′N 95°42′W
- Country: Mexico
- State: Veracruz
- Seat: Villa Azueta

Area
  - Total: 585 km^{2} (226 sq mi)
- Elevation: 30 m (98 ft)

Population (2010)
  - Total: 24,000
- Website: www.joseazueta.gob.mx

José Azueta is a municipality in the Mexican state of Veracruz.

== Geography ==
It is located in south zone of the State of Veracruz, about 205 km from state capital Xalapa. It has a surface of 582.63 km^{2}. It is located at 18°04′N 95°42′W.

=== Borders ===
José Azueta Municipality is delimited to the north by Tlacotalpan Municipality and Amatitlán Municipality to the east by Isla Municipality, to the south by Playa Vicente Municipality, to the west by Chacaltianguis Municipality, Cosamaloapan Municipality and Oaxaca State.

=== Weather ===
The weather in José Azueta is warm all year with rains in summer and autumn.

== Products ==
It produces principally maize, beans, rice, watermelon, green chile and sugarcane.

== Events ==
In José Azueta, the celebration in honor to Cristo Rey, Patron of the town takes place in November.
