= 8th federal electoral district of Veracruz =

Federal electoral district of Mexico

Veracruz's 8th
- Electoral district of the Chamber of Deputies of Mexico

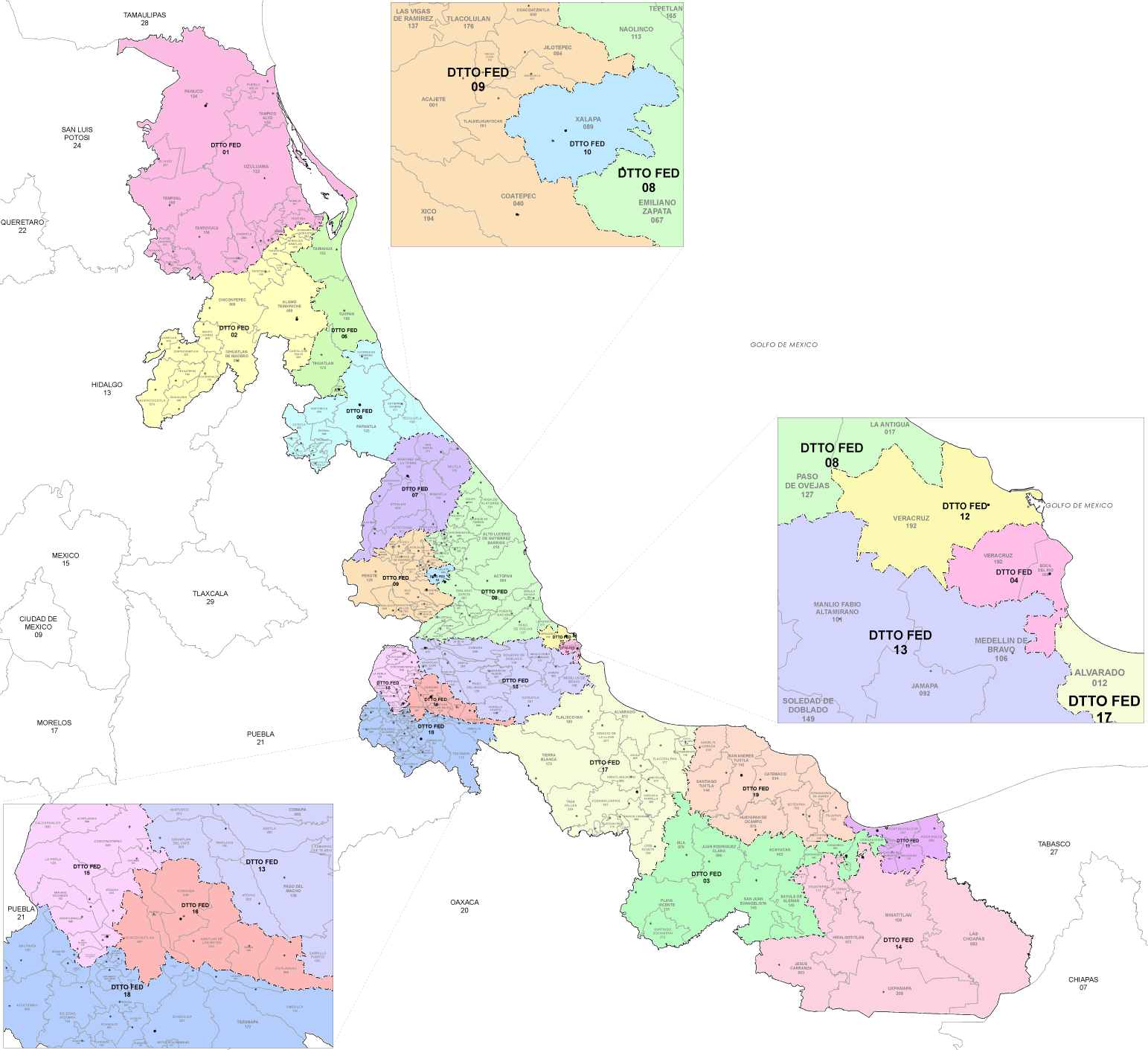
- 8th district since 2023

Incumbent
- Member: Jorge Alberto Mier Acolt
- Party: ▌Morena
- Congress: 66th (2024–2027)

District
- State: Veracruz
- Head town: Las Trancas, Xalapa
- Coordinates: 19°30′N 96°52′W
- Covers: 22 municipalities: Acatlán, Actopan, Alto Lucero de Gutiérrez Barrios, Apazapan, Chiconquiaco, Colipa, Emiliano Zapata, Jalcomulco, Juchique de Ferrer, La Antigua, Landero y Coss, Miahuatlán, Naolinco, Paso de Ovejas, Puente Nacional, Tenampa, Tlaltetela, Tonayán, Totutla, Vega de Alatorre, Yecuatla, Úrsulo Galván
- PR region: Third
- Precincts: 309
- Population: 439,061 (2020 census)

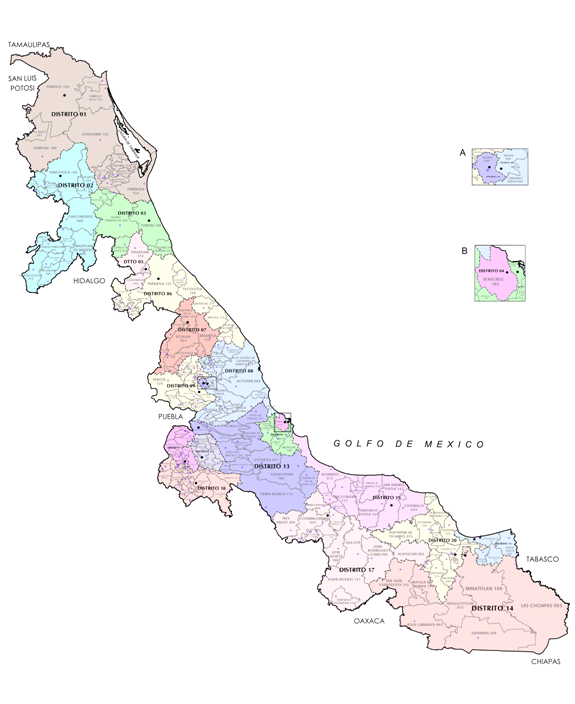
Veracruz under the 2017–2022 districting plan

The 8th federal electoral district of Veracruz (Spanish: Distrito electoral federal 08 de Veracruz) is one of the 300 electoral districts into which Mexico is divided for elections to the federal Chamber of Deputies and one of 19 such districts in the state of Veracruz.

It elects one deputy to the lower house of Congress for each three-year legislative session by means of the first-past-the-post system. Votes cast in the district also count towards the calculation of proportional representation ("plurinominal") deputies elected from the third region.

The current member for the district, elected in the 2024 general election, is Jorge Alberto Mier Acolt of the National Regeneration Movement (Morena).

== District territory ==
Veracruz lost a congressional district in the 2023 districting plan adopted by the National Electoral Institute (INE), which is to be used for the 2024, 2027 and 2030 elections. The reconfigured 8th district covers 309 electoral precincts (secciones electorales) across 22 municipalities to the east of the state capital, Xalapa:

- Acatlán, Actopan, Alto Lucero de Gutiérrez Barrios, Apazapan, Chiconquiaco, Colipa, Emiliano Zapata, Jalcomulco, Juchique de Ferrer, La Antigua, Landero y Coss, Miahuatlán, Naolinco, Paso de Ovejas, Puente Nacional, Tenampa, Tlaltetela, Tonayán, Totutla, Vega de Alatorre, Yecuatla and Úrsulo Galván.

The head town (cabecera distrital), where results from individual polling stations are gathered together and tallied, is Las Trancas (a south-eastern suburb of Xalapa). The district reported a population of 439,061 in the 2020 census.

== Previous districting schemes ==
Evolution of electoral district numbers
	1974	1978	1996	2005	2017	2023
Veracruz	15	23	23	21	20	19
Chamber of Deputies	196	300				

Because of shifting demographics, Veracruz currently has four fewer districts than the 23 the state was allocated under the 1977 electoral reforms.

2017–2022

Between 2017 and 2022, Veracruz was assigned 20 electoral districts. The 8th district comprised 22 municipalities in broadly the same region of the state:
- Acatlán, Actopan, Alto Lucero de Gutierrez Barrios, Apazapan, Chiconquiaco, Emiliano Zapata, Jalcomulco, Juchique de Ferrer, La Antigua, Landero y Coss, Miahuatlán, Naolinco, Puente Nacional, Tenampa, Tepetlán, Tlacotepec de Mejía, Tlaltetela, Tonayán, Totutla, Úrsulo Galván, Xalapa (partial, split with the 10th district) and Yecuatla.
Its head town was at Xalapa.

2005–2017

Veracruz's allocation of congressional seats fell to 21 in the 2005 redistricting process. Between 2005 and 2017 the district had its head town at Xalapa. It covered 33 precincts in the municipality of Xalapa and 18 other municipalities in their entirety:
- Acatlán, Actopan, Alto Lucero de Gutiérrez Barrios, Apazapan, Banderilla, Colipa, Chiconquiaco, Emiliano Zapata, Jalcomulco, Jilotepec, Juchique de Ferrer, Miahuatlán, Naolinco, Tepetlán, Tonayán, Úrsulo Galván, Vega de Alatorre and Yecuatla.

1996–2005

Under the 1996 districting plan, which allocated Veracruz 23 districts, the head town was at Misantla and the district covered 16 municipalities.

1978–1996

The districting scheme in force from 1978 to 1996 was the result of the 1977 electoral reforms, which increased the number of single-member seats in the Chamber of Deputies from 196 to 300. Under that plan, Veracruz's seat allocation rose from 15 to 23. The 8th district had its head town at Huatusco and it covered the municipalities of Camarón de Tejeda, Alpatláhuac, Axocuapan, Ayahualulco, Calcahualco, Carrillo Puerto, Comapan, Cosautlán, Coscomatepec, Cotaxtla, Chocamán, Huatusco, Ixhuacán, Ixhuatlán, Paso del Macho, Sochiapa, Soledad de Doblado, Tenampa, Teocelo, Tepatlaxco, Tlacotepec, Tomatlán, Totutla and Zentla.

== Deputies returned to Congress ==
(Mexico) National parties
- Current
- PAN
- PRI
- PT
- PVEM
- MC
- Morena
- PAZ
- Somos
- Defunct or local only
- PLM
- PNR
- PRM
- PNM
- PP
- PPS
- PARM
- PFCRN
- CON
- PANAL
- PSD
- PES
- PES
- PRD

Veracruz's 8th district
Election	Deputy	Party	Term	Legislature
1916	Josafat F. Márquez		1916–1917	Constituent Congress of Querétaro
...
1973	Lilia Berthely Jiménez	Institutional Revolutionary Party	1973–1976	49th Congress
1976	Celeste Castillo Moreno	Institutional Revolutionary Party	1976–1979	50th Congress
1979	Hesiquio Aguilar de la Parra	Institutional Revolutionary Party	1979–1982	51st Congress
1982	José Nassar Tenorio	Institutional Revolutionary Party	1982–1985	52nd Congress
1985	María Aurora Munguía Archundia	Institutional Revolutionary Party	1985–1988	53rd Congress
1988	Fernando Córdoba Lobo	Institutional Revolutionary Party	1988–1991	54th Congress
1991	Miguel Ángel Yunes Linares	Institutional Revolutionary Party	1991–1994	55th Congress
1994	Felipe Amadeo Flores Espinosa	Institutional Revolutionary Party	1994–1997	56th Congress
1997	Félix Hadad Aparicio	Institutional Revolutionary Party	1997–2000	57th Congress
2000	Juan Nicolás Callejas Arroyo	Institutional Revolutionary Party	2000–2003	58th Congress
2003	Gustavo Moreno Ramos	Institutional Revolutionary Party	2003–2006	59th Congress
2006	Marcos Salas Contreras	National Action Party (Mexico)	2006–2009	60th Congress
2009	Silvio Lagos Galindo	Institutional Revolutionary Party	2009–2012	61st Congress
2012	José Alejandro Montano Guzmán	Institutional Revolutionary Party	2012–2015	62nd Congress
2015	Adolfo Mota Hernández	Institutional Revolutionary Party	2015–2018	63rd Congress
2018	Claudia Tello Espinosa (Note: Tello Espinosa was originally the alternate of Daniela Griego Ceballos; she assumed the seat in her own right after Griego's candidacy was ruled invalid.)	National Regeneration Movement	2018–2021	64th Congress
2021	Claudia Tello Espinosa	National Regeneration Movement	2021–2024	65th Congress
2024	Jorge Alberto Mier Acolt	National Regeneration Movement	2024–2027	66th Congress

== Presidential elections ==
Veracruz's 8th district
Election	District won by	Party or coalition	%
2018	Andrés Manuel López Obrador	Juntos Haremos Historia	49.1947
2024	Claudia Sheinbaum Pardo	Sigamos Haciendo Historia	69.0239
