= Jilotepec, Veracruz =

Jilotepec
- Municipality
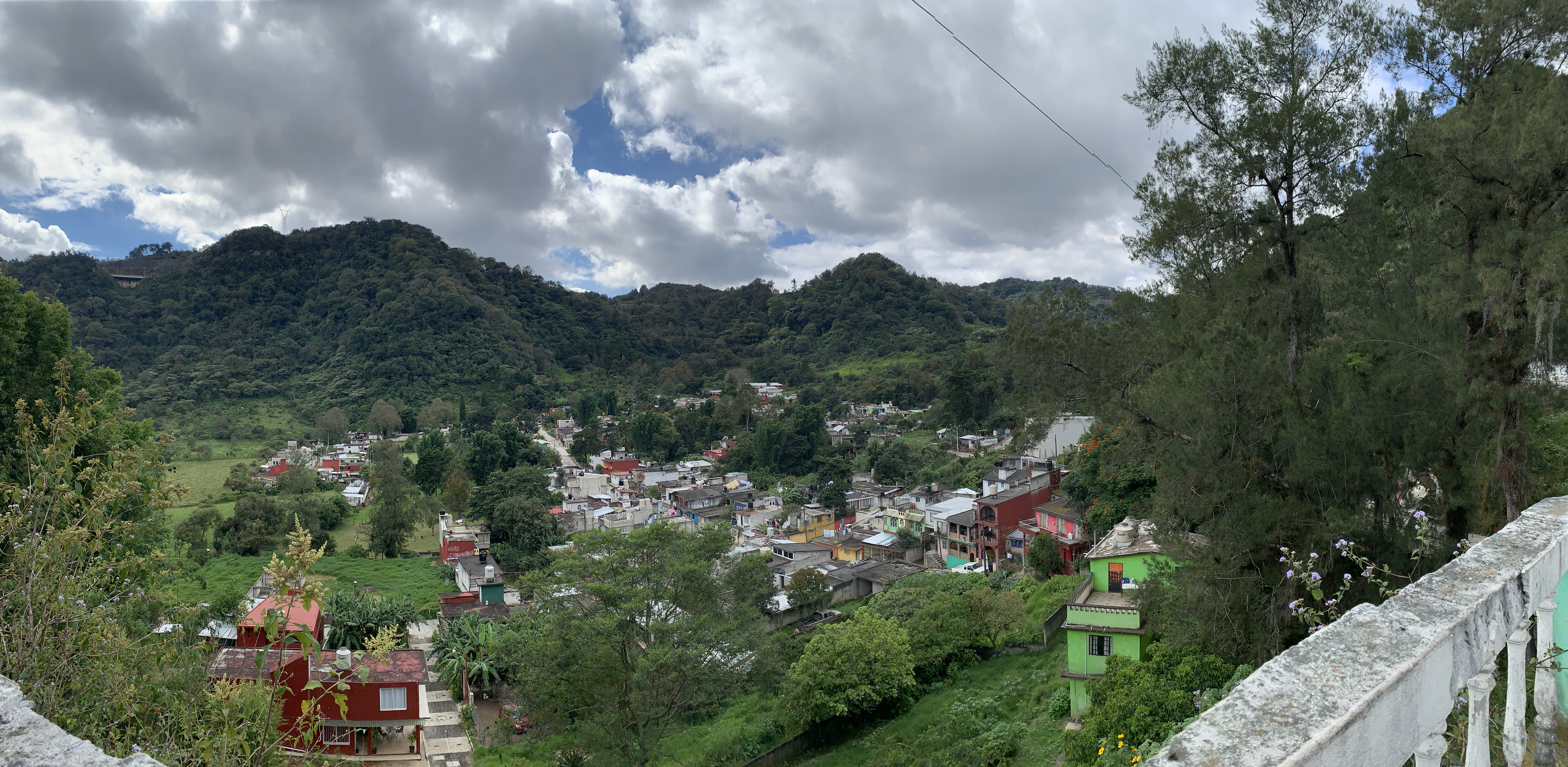
- Panoramic view of Jilotepec

- Location in Veracruz

- Location in Mexico
- Coordinates: 19°36′35″N 96°57′04″W
- Country: Mexico
- State: Veracruz
- Region: Capital Region
- Municipal seat and largest town: Jilotepec

Government
  - Mayor: Balbino Castillo Murrieta (PVEM)

Area
  - Total: 56.2 km^{2} (21.7 sq mi)
- Elevation (of seat): 1,368 m (4,488 ft)

Population (2020)
  - Total: 16,585
  - Density: 295.2/km^{2} (765/sq mi)
  - Seat: 4,309
- Time zone: UTC-6 (Central)
- Postal codes: 91380–91396
- Area code: 228
- Website: Official website

Jilotepec (Nahuatl: "on the hill of jilotes") is a municipality in the Mexican state of Veracruz, located 11 kilometres (6.8 mi) north-northwest of the state capital Xalapa.

== Geography ==
The municipality of Jilotepec is located in central Veracruz at an altitude between 860 and 1,900 metres (2,820–6,230 ft). It borders the municipalities of Coacoatzintla to the north, Naolinco to the northeast, Xalapa to the southeast, Banderilla to the south, Rafael Lucio to the southwest, and Tlacolulan to the northwest. The municipality covers an area of 56.437 square kilometres (21.790 sq mi) and comprises 0.1% of the state's area.

The municipality is drained by upper tributaries of the Actopan River. The perennial Naolinco River forms part of Jilotepec's border with the municipality of Naolinco.

Jilotepec's climate is generally humid with rain throughout the year. Average temperatures in the municipality range between 16 and 22 °C (61–72 °F), and average annual precipitation ranges between 1,400 and 1,600 millimetres (55–63 in).

Climate data for La Concepción weather station at 19°36′17″N 96°54′00″W, 1000 m above sea level (1981–2010 averages, 1951–2010 extremes)
Month	Jan	Feb	Mar	Apr	May	Jun	Jul	Aug	Sep	Oct	Nov	Dec	Year
Record high °C (°F)	33.0 (91.4)	32.5 (90.5)	36.0 (96.8)	40.0 (104.0)	40.0 (104.0)	42.0 (107.6)	40.0 (104.0)	36.0 (96.8)	36.0 (96.8)	39.0 (102.2)	35.0 (95.0)	32.5 (90.5)	42.0 (107.6)
Mean daily maximum °C (°F)	20.0 (68.0)	21.3 (70.3)	23.4 (74.1)	26.1 (79.0)	27.4 (81.3)	26.7 (80.1)	25.9 (78.6)	26.0 (78.8)	25.3 (77.5)	24.2 (75.6)	22.5 (72.5)	20.9 (69.6)	24.1 (75.4)
Daily mean °C (°F)	15.6 (60.1)	16.6 (61.9)	18.4 (65.1)	20.9 (69.6)	22.2 (72.0)	21.9 (71.4)	21.1 (70.0)	21.2 (70.2)	20.9 (69.6)	19.7 (67.5)	18.0 (64.4)	16.4 (61.5)	19.4 (66.9)
Mean daily minimum °C (°F)	11.2 (52.2)	11.9 (53.4)	13.5 (56.3)	15.7 (60.3)	17.1 (62.8)	17.1 (62.8)	16.3 (61.3)	16.4 (61.5)	16.4 (61.5)	15.1 (59.2)	13.5 (56.3)	12.0 (53.6)	14.7 (58.5)
Record low °C (°F)	3.0 (37.4)	3.0 (37.4)	4.5 (40.1)	6.5 (43.7)	10.5 (50.9)	11.0 (51.8)	9.0 (48.2)	11.0 (51.8)	11.0 (51.8)	8.0 (46.4)	6.5 (43.7)	2.0 (35.6)	2.0 (35.6)
Average precipitation mm (inches)	67.9 (2.67)	59.7 (2.35)	63.0 (2.48)	73.0 (2.87)	125.2 (4.93)	285.5 (11.24)	239.2 (9.42)	203.7 (8.02)	260.0 (10.24)	146.4 (5.76)	59.6 (2.35)	56.8 (2.24)	1,640 (64.57)
Average precipitation days (≥ 0.1 mm)	9.4	8.3	7.9	8.0	9.8	16.0	14.7	14.4	16.0	12.1	8.8	9.3	134.7
Source: Servicio Meteorológico Nacional

== History ==
Jilotepec was founded by the Totonac people in 980 as part of the confederation of Tlacolulan. The Teochichimecas controlled Jilotepec from 1380 to 1489, when Jilotepec switched its allegiance to the Aztec Empire. A hacienda was established at La Concepción at the end of the 16th century. The parish of Jilotepec was inaugurated in 1811.

On 28 March 1831, Jilotepec became a municipality in the canton of Xalapa in the state of Veracruz. It became a free municipality on 15 January 1918. From 1995 to the beginning of the 21st century a wave of emigration occurred from central Veracruz to the United States; inhabitants from Jilotepec in particular preferred to emigrate to New York City.

== Administration ==
The municipal government comprises a president, a councillor (Spanish: síndico), and a trustee (regidor). The current president of the municipality is Sergio Fernández Lara.

== Demographics ==
Historical population
Year	Pop.	±%
1995	12,743	—
2000	13,025	+2.2%
2005	13,653	+4.8%
2010	15,313	+12.2%
2015	16,682	+8.9%
2020	16,585	−0.6%

In the 2020 INEGI census, the municipality of Jilotepec recorded a population of 16,585 inhabitants living in 3474 localities. The 2015 Intercensal Survey estimated a population of 16,682 inhabitants in Jilotepec, of which 3.97% reported being of African descent.

There are 34 localities in the municipality, of which two are classified as urban:

- The municipal seat, also called Jilotepec, which recorded a population of 4,309 inhabitants in the 2020 Census.
- La Concepción, located 6 kilometres (3.7 mi) east of the municipal seat, which recorded 3,707 inhabitants in 2020.

Other localities include Vista Hermosa (1,649 hab.), Paso de San Juan (1,214 hab.) and El Pueblito (1,198 hab.).

== Economy ==
The main economic activity in Jilotepec is agriculture, involving mainly the cultivation of coffee, sugarcane, corn and beans. Cattle and pigs are also raised.
