= Rafael Lucio =

- Municipality
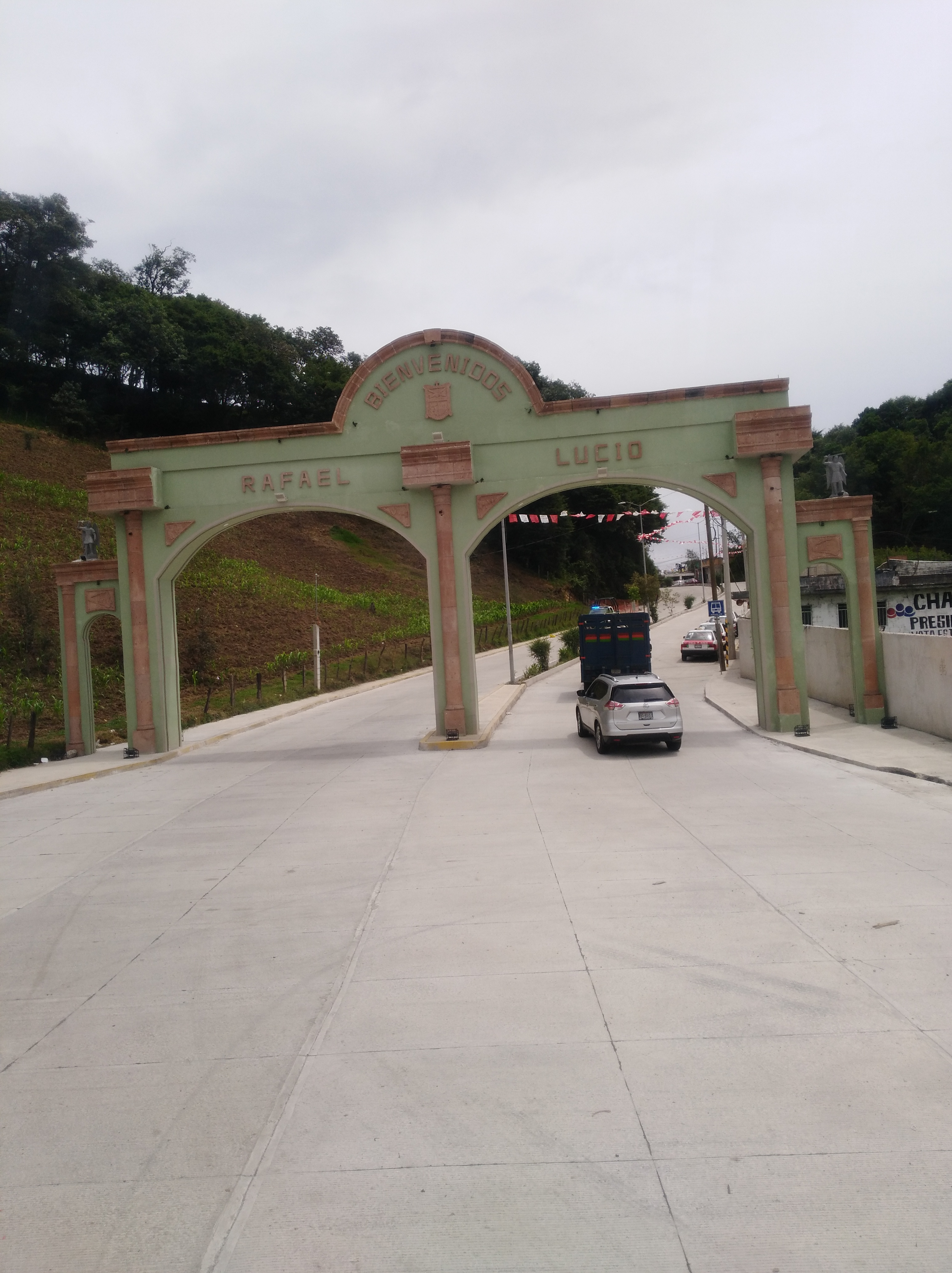
- Rafel Lucio main gate

- Location in Veracruz

- Location in Mexico
- Coordinates: 19°35′32″N 96°58′55″W
- Country: Mexico
- State: Veracruz
- Region: Capital Region
- Municipal seat and largest town: Rafael Lucio

Government
  - Mayor: Damián Hernández Hernández (RSP)

Area
  - Total: 11.5 km^{2} (4.4 sq mi)
- Elevation (of seat): 1,600 m (5,200 ft)

Population (2020)
  - Total: 8,343
  - Density: 723/km^{2} (1,870/sq mi)
  - Seat: 4,837
- Time zone: UTC-6 (Central)
- Postal codes: 91315
- Area code: 228
- Website: website

Rafael Lucio is a municipality located in the montane central zone of the Mexican state of Veracruz, about 9 km from the state capital Xalapa. It has a surface of 24.68 km^{2}. It is located at 19°35′N 96°59′W.

By Decree of November 5, 1932 Rafael Lucio's municipality and the head-board is created they are named Rafael Lucio, in honor of the illustrious doctor of Xalapa.

== Geography ==
The municipality of Rafael Lucio is delimited to the north by Tlacolulan and Jilotepec, to the southeast by Banderilla, to the south by Tlalnelhuayocan and to the west by Tres Valles. It is watered by small tributaries of the Actopan River.

The weather in Rafael Lucio is cold and wet all year with rains in summer and autumn.

== Demographics ==
Historical population
Year	Pop.	±%
1995	4,657	—
2000	5,342	+14.7%
2005	5,966	+11.7%
2010	7,023	+17.7%
2015	8,068	+14.9%
2020	8,343	+3.4%

In 2020, Rafael Lucio recorded population of 8,343 inhabitantes in 17 localities. Rafael Lucio, the municipal seat, it's the only one classified as urban, with a population of 4,837 hab. Other localities include Piletas (1,498 hab.), Teapan (725 hab.) and Tres de Mayo (258 hab.).

== Agriculture ==
It produces principally maize.

== Celebrations ==
In September the celebration honoring San Miguel Archangel, patron of the town, takes place, and in December there occurs the celebration in honor of Virgin of Guadalupe.
