= Claudia Tello Espinosa =

Mexican politician

Senator for Veracruz
- Incumbent
- Assumed office 27 July 2026
- Preceded by: Raquel Bonilla Herrera
- In office 1 September 2024 – 20 November 2024
- Preceded by: Gloria Sánchez Hernández
- Succeeded by: Raquel Bonilla Herrera

Secretary of the Veracruz Education Secretariat
- In office 1 December 2024 – 27 July 2026
- Governor: Rocío Nahle
- Preceded by: Víctor Vargas Barrientos
- Succeeded by: Raquel Bonilla Herrera

Member of the Chamber of Deputies for Veracruz's 8th district
- In office 1 September 2018 – 31 August 2024
- Preceded by: Adolfo Mota Hernández
- Succeeded by: Jorge Alberto Mier Acolt

Personal details
- Born: 16 October 1964 (age 61)
- Party: National Regeneration Movement

Claudia Tello Espinosa (Note: In this Mexican name, the surname is Tello and the second or maternal family name is Espinosa.) (born 16 October 1964) is a Mexican politician from the National Regeneration Movement (Morena). She has sat in both chambers of Congress.

== Political career ==
Tello Espinosa earned a bachelor's degree in sociology from the Universidad Veracruzana. She also holds a master's in educational science and a doctorate in rational education and biolearning. She worked as a secondary school teacher for more than 20 years and, as a member of the National Union of Education Workers (SNTE), opposed the reforms to the education system proposed by President Enrique Peña Nieto in 2012. In 2013 she joined the National Regeneration Movement (Morena).

In the 2018 general election she was the alternate of Daniela Griego Ceballos, who successfully contended Veracruz's 8th electoral district (Xalapa Rural) for a seat in the federal Chamber of Deputies. Shortly after the election, however, Griego's candidacy was ruled invalid and Tello assumed the seat for the duration of the 64th session of Congress. She was re-elected to the seat in the 2021 mid-terms.

Tello was elected as one of Veracruz's senators in the 2024 Senate election, occupying the first place on the Sigamos Haciendo Historia coalition's two-name formula. After the election, however, incoming governor of Veracruz Rocío Nahle García announced that she wanted Tello to head the Veracruz state education department during her term in office; Tello's seat in the Senate was taken up by her alternate, Raquel Bonilla Herrera, on 26 November 2024.

On 27 July 2026, Governor Nahle reshuffled her cabinet: Bonilla was appointed state education secretary, with which Tello returned to her seat in the Senate.
