= Acatlán =

Acatlán (Nahuatl: acatl for "cane or reed" and tlan for "together or close") may refer to:

- Acatlán, Hidalgo, town
- Acatlán, Veracruz
- Acatlán Municipality, Veracruz
- Acatlán de Juárez, Jalisco
- Acatlán de Osorio, Puebla
- Acatlán de Pérez Figueroa, Oaxaca
- San Luis Acatlán, Guerrero
- Facultad de Estudios Superiores Acatlán at the National Autonomous University of Mexico
