= Apazapan =

- Municipality
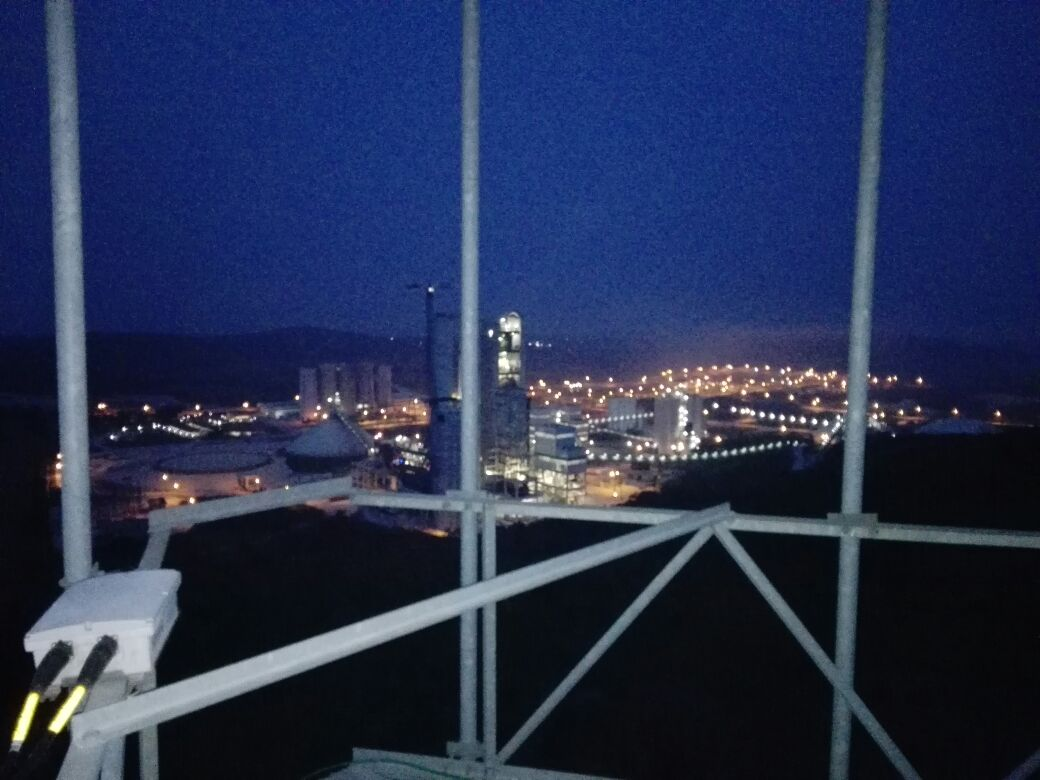

- Location in Mexico Apazapan (Mexico)
- Coordinates: 19°19′00″N 96°43′00″W
- Country: Mexico
- State: Veracruz
- Region: Capital Region

Government
  - Mayor: Gustavo Flores Colorado (!Podemos¡)

Area
  - Total: 67.3 km^{2} (26.0 sq mi)
- Elevation (of seat): 408 m (1,339 ft)

Population (2020)
  - Total: 4,709
  - Density: 70/km^{2} (180/sq mi)
  - Seat: 833
- Time zone: UTC-6 (Central (US Central))
- Postal code (of seat): 30001
- Website: (in Spanish)

Historical population
Year	Pop.	±%
1995	3,952	—
2000	3,611	−8.6%
2005	3,534	−2.1%
2010	4,027	+14.0%
2015	4,009	−0.4%
2020	4,709	+17.5%

Apazapan is a municipality in the Mexican state of Veracruz. It is located about 65 km from state capital Xalapa. It has a surface of 65.80 km^{2}. It is located at 19°19′N 96°43′W. Apazapan was a population totonac in the days of the Spanish conquest that preserved the indigenous language up to the 19th century and there was one of the points marked in the Codex Dehesa, when the Nonoalcos de Zongolíca, crossed Cocolapa, Coscomatepec, Tepeyehualco, Chiconquiaco and for Apazapan they returned to Zongolíca. During the 16th century, it belonged to the marquisate of Paxaca's Valley started to Hernán Cortés.

== Geography ==
The municipality of Apazapan is delimited to the north and to the east by Emiliano Zapata, to the south-east by Puente Nacional, to the south-west by Tlaltetela and to the west by Jalcomulco. It is watered by the river of Los Pescados or of La Antigua.

The weather in Apazapan is warm and wet all year with rains in summer and autumn.

== Demographics ==
As of 2020, the municipality had a population of 4,709 inhabitants in 11 localities. About 17% resides in the municipal seat; other localities include Chahuapan (931 hab.), Cerro Colorado (911 hab.), Tigrillos (719 hab.) and Agua Caliente (599 hab.).

== Agriculture ==
1,245 ha of the municipality are used for agricultural activity. Main products include maize, lemons and mangoes.

== Celebrations ==
In Apazapan , in July takes place the celebration in honor to Santo Tomás Apostol, Patron of the town, and in December takes place the celebration in honor to Virgen de Guadalupe.
