= Juchique de Ferrer =

Municipality in Veracruz, Mexico

- Municipality
- Location in Mexico Juchique de Ferrer (Mexico)
- Country: Mexico
- State: Veracruz
- Demonym: (in Spanish)
- Time zone: UTC−6 (CST)

Juchique de Ferrer is a municipality in the Mexican state of Veracruz. It is located in the central zone of the state, about 259.10 km from the state capital Xalapa. It has a surface of 934.20 km^{2}. It is located at 19°50′N 96°42′W.

== Geography ==
The municipality of Juchique de Ferrer is delimited to the north by Colipa to the east by Vega de Alatorre, to the south-east by Alto Lucero, to the south by Tepetlán, to the north-west by Yecuatla and to the south-west by Chiconquiaco.

The weather in Juchique de Ferrer is warm all year with rains in summer and autumn.

== Economy ==
It produces principally maize, beans, coffee and green chile.

== Culture ==
In Juchique de Ferrer, in March takes place the celebration in honor to San José Patron of the town.
