= Coacoatzintla =

- Municipality
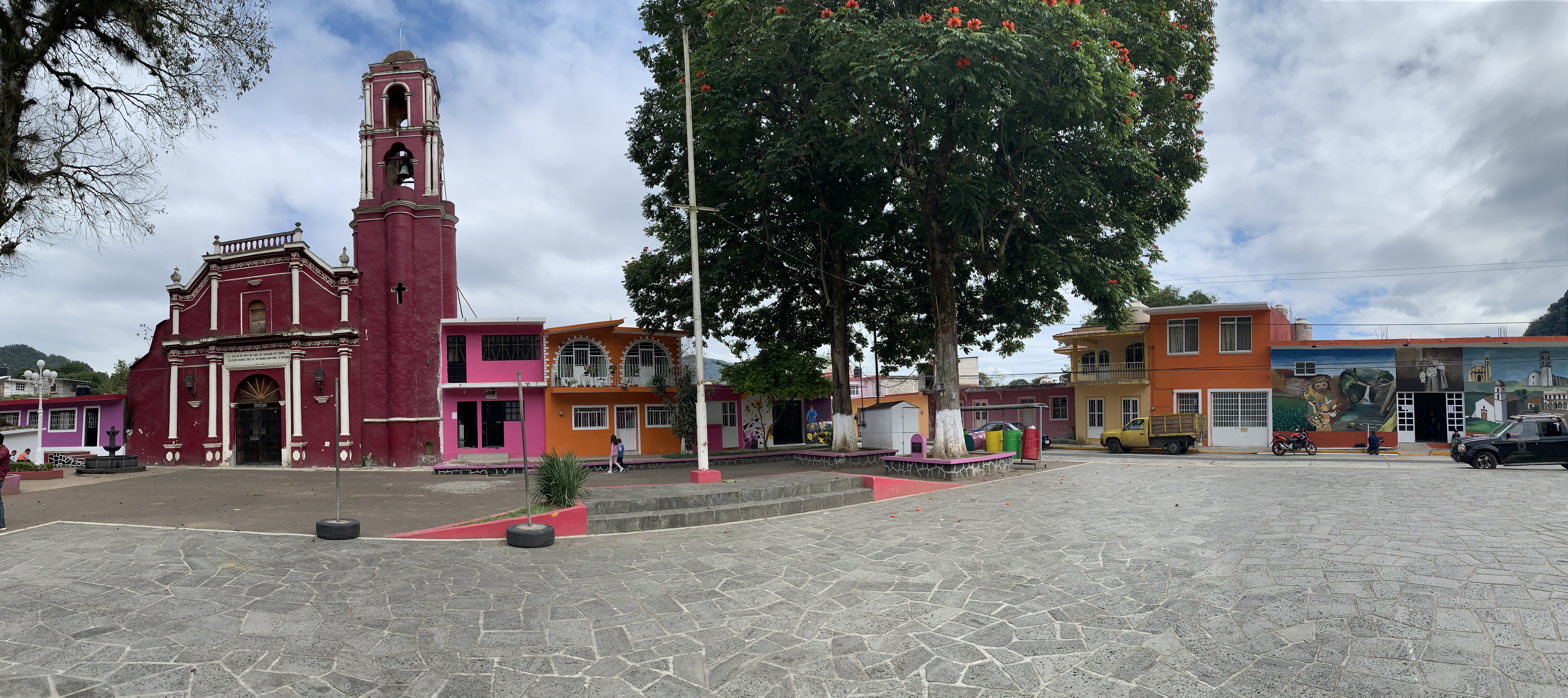
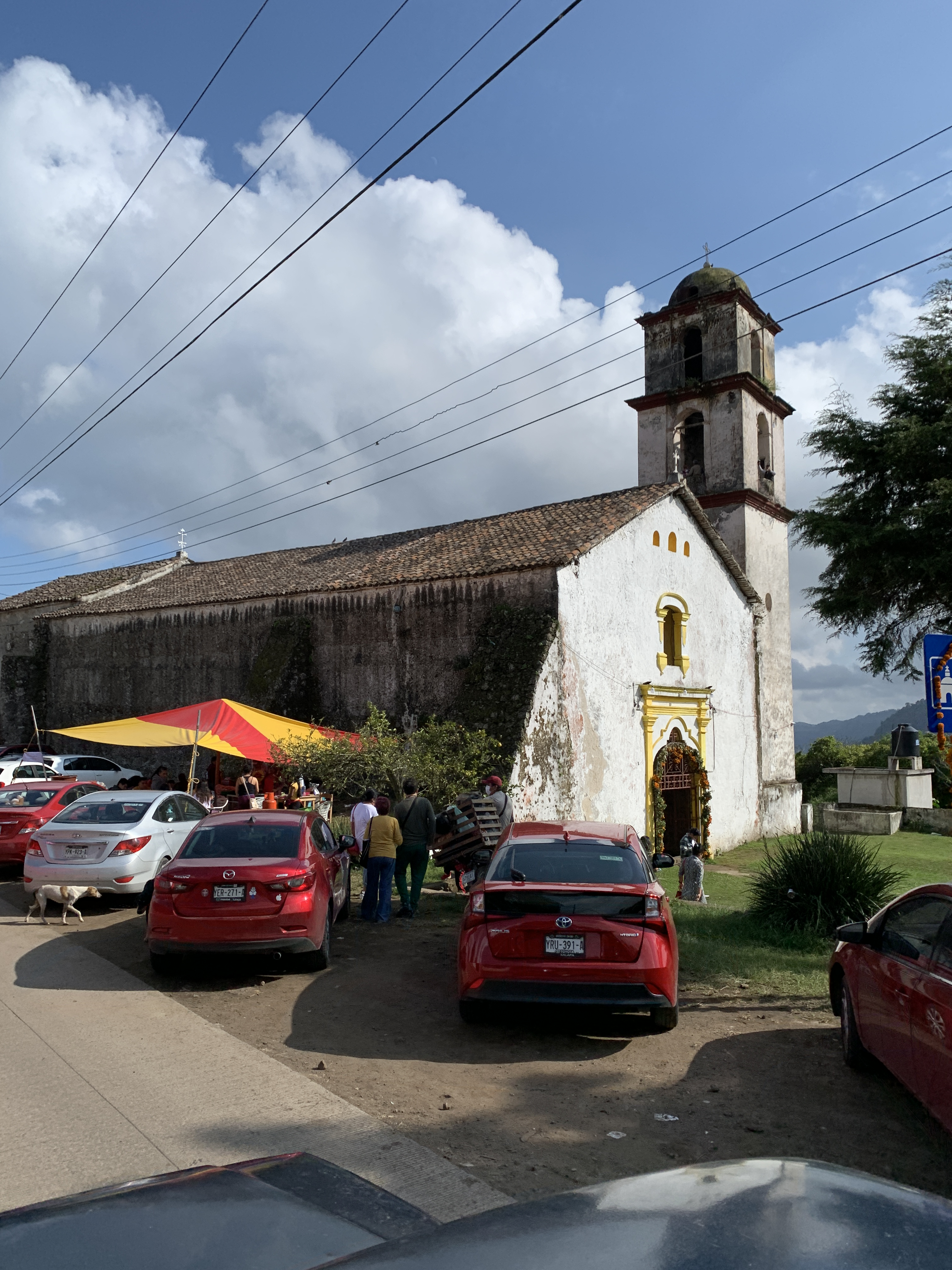
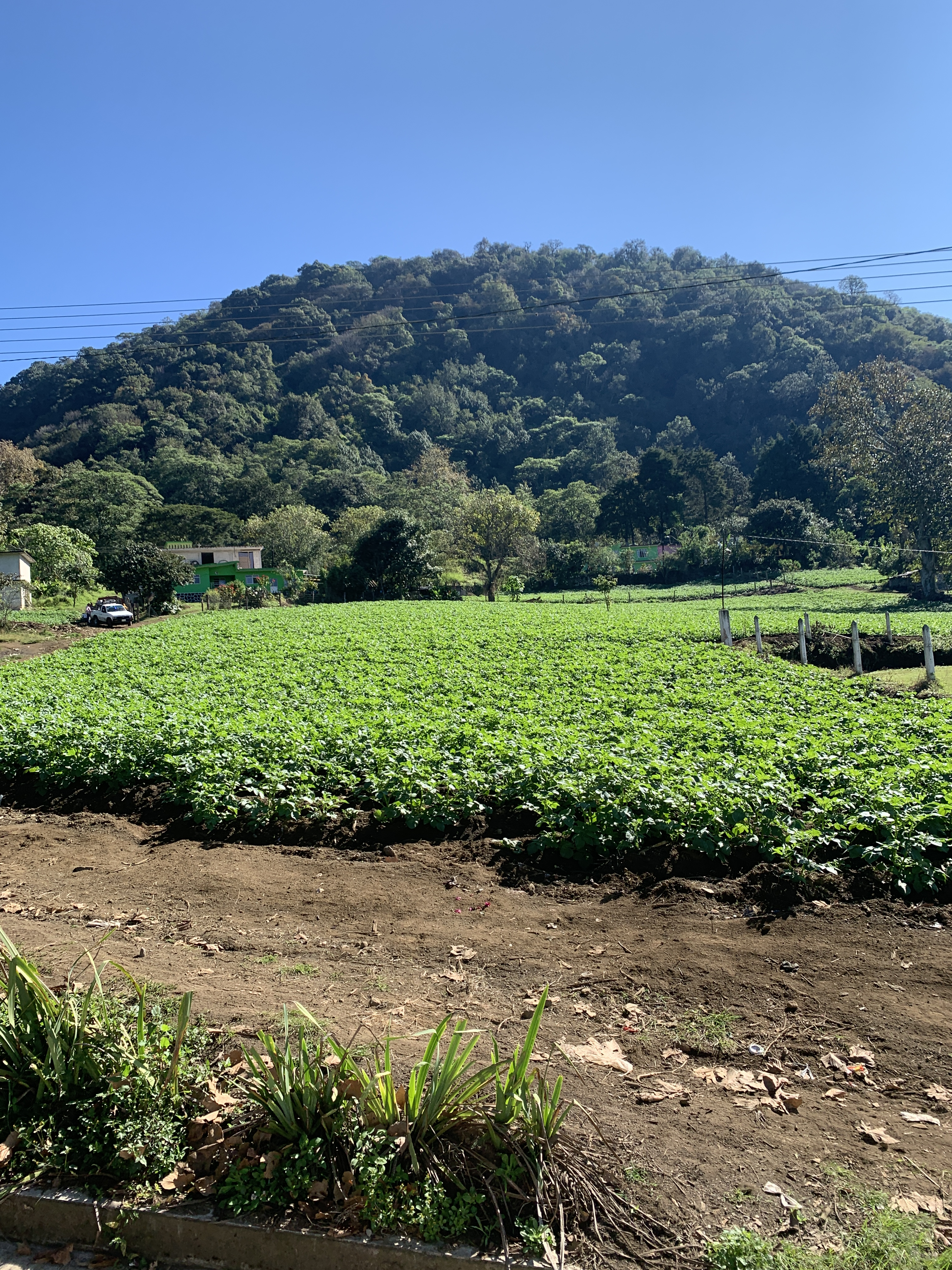
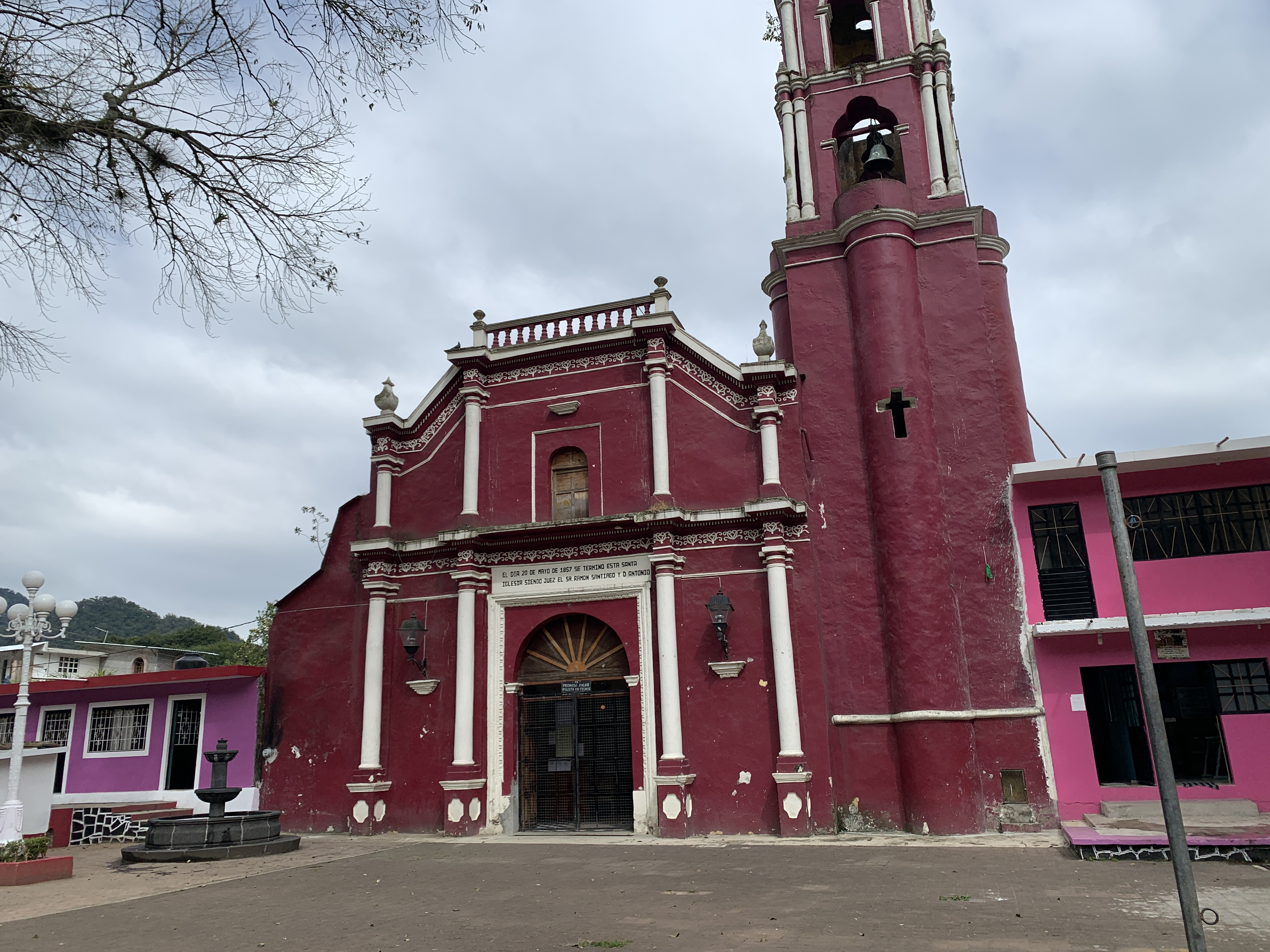
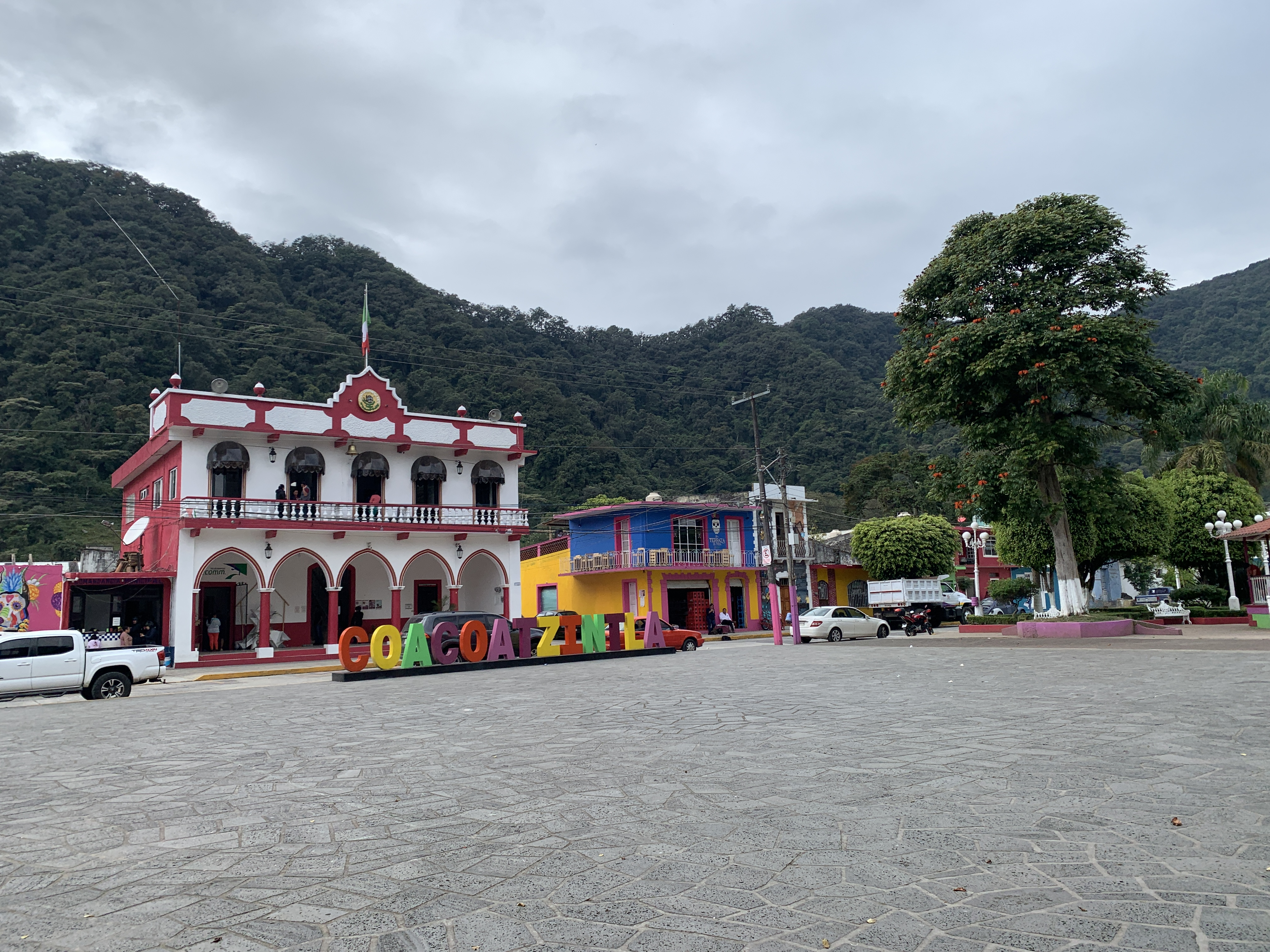
- Top: Coacoatzintla main plaza; Middle: Paxtepec Town, Coacoatzintla rural landscape; Bottom: Santiago Apóstol Church, Coacoatzintla Municipal Palace

- Location in Mexico Coacoatzintla (Mexico)
- Coordinates: 19°39′00″N 96°56′00″W
- Country: Mexico
- State: Veracruz
- Region: Capital Region
- Municipal seat and largest town: Coacoatzintla

Government
  - Mayor: José Rodolfo Durán Méndez (!Podemos¡)

Area
  - Total: 43.9 km^{2} (16.9 sq mi)
- Elevation (of seat): 1,722 m (5,650 ft)

Population (2020)
  - Total: 11,018
  - Density: 250.9/km^{2} (650/sq mi)
  - Seat: 7,977
- Time zone: UTC-6 (Central (US Central))
- Postal code (of seat): 91370
- Website: (in Spanish)

Historical population
Year	Pop.	±%
1995	6,584	—
2000	7,301	+10.9%
2005	8,294	+13.6%
2010	9,416	+13.5%
2015	10,482	+11.3%
2020	11,018	+5.1%

Coacoatzintla in a municipality in the Mexican state of Veracruz. It is located in the mountainous central zone of the state, about 11.5 km from the state capital Xalapa. It has a surface of 43.9 km^{2}. It is located at 19°39′N 96°56′W.

== Geography ==
The municipality of Coacoatzintla is delimited to the north by Tonayan, to the north-east by Miahuatlán, to the east by Naolinco, to the south-east by Jilotepec, to the south by Banderilla and to the west by Tlacolulan. The climate in Coacoatzintla is wet and cold with rains all year round.

== Demographics ==
As of 2020, the municipality had a population of 11,018 inhabitants in 20 localities. More than 70% resides in the municipal seat; other localities include Los Planes (616 hab.), Pueblo Viejo (325 hab.) and Tlachinola (265 hab.).

== Economy ==
It produces principally maize and potatoes.

== Culture ==
The celebration in honor to Santiago Apostol, patron of the town, occurs in July.
