= Gustavo Moreno Ramos =

Mexican politician

- Born: 2 August 1948 (age 77); Misantla, Veracruz, Mexico
- Occupation: Politician
- Political party: PANAL

Gustavo Moreno Ramos (born 2 August 1948) is a Mexican politician affiliated with the New Alliance Party. In the 2003 mid-terms he was elected to the Chamber of Deputies to represent the eighth district of Veracruz during the 59th Congress. He previously served as municipal president of Misantla from 1997 to 2000 and as a local deputy in the 59th session of the Congress of Veracruz.
