= José Alejandro Montano =

Mexican politician

José Alejandro Montano Guzmán
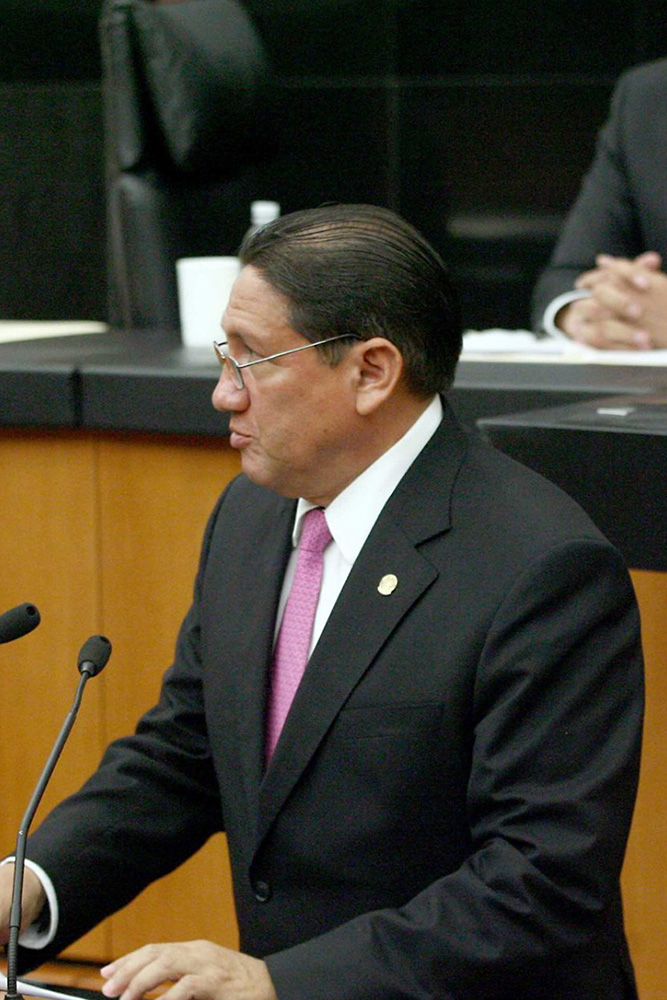
- Born: 26 November 1956 (age 69); Xalapa, Veracruz, Mexico
- Occupation: Deputy
- Political party: PRI

José Alejandro Montano Guzmán (born 26 November 1956) is a Mexican politician affiliated with the Institutional Revolutionary Party (PRI). In the 2012 general election he was elected to the Chamber of Deputies to represent the eighth district of Veracruz during the 62nd Congress.
