= Silvio Lagos Galindo =

Mexican politician

- Born: 9 January 1978 (age 48); Xalapa, Veracruz, Mexico
- Occupation: Politician
- Political party: PRI

Silvio Lagos Galindo (born 7 January 1978) is a Mexican politician from the Institutional Revolutionary Party (PRI). In the 2009 mid-terms he was elected to the Chamber of Deputies to represent the eighth district of Veracruz during the 61st Congress.
