= Tenampa =

Municipality in Veracruz, Mexico

- Municipality
- Interactive map of Tenampa
- Coordinates: 19°15′N 96°53′W
- Country: Mexico
- State: Veracruz

Area
  - Total: 69.92 km^{2} (27.00 sq mi)

Tenampa is a municipality located in the montane central zone in the Mexican state of Veracruz, about 30 km from the state capital Xalapa. It has a surface area of 69.92 km^{2}. It is located at 19°15′N 96°53′W. In 1455 war came to the municipality by means of the emperor Moctezuma. In 1514, the Spanish conquest resulted in the area being renamed, baptized as Xampala-Tenampa. In 1912 general Jiménez fought the battle of Cotlamanes's hill against the Government of Victoriano Huerta.

== Geography ==
The municipality of Tenampa is delimited to the north by Tlaltetela and to the south by Totutla. It is watered by several rivers as Huitzilapan river and La Antigua river.

The weather in Tenampa is warm and wet all year with rains in summer and autumn.

== Agriculture ==
It produces principally maize, coffee and mango.

== Celebrations ==
In Tenampa, the celebration in honor to San Francisco de Asís, Patron of the town takes place in October, and the celebration in honor to Virgen de Guadalupe takes place in December.
