= Marcos Salas Contreras =

Mexican politician

- Born: 25 April 1955 (age 71); Veracruz, Mexico
- Occupation: Politician
- Political party: PAN

Marcos Salas Contreras (born 25 April 1955) is a Mexican politician from the National Action Party (PAN). In the 2006 general election he was elected to the Chamber of Deputies to represent the eighth district of Veracruz during the 60th Congress.
