= Landero y Coss =

- Municipality
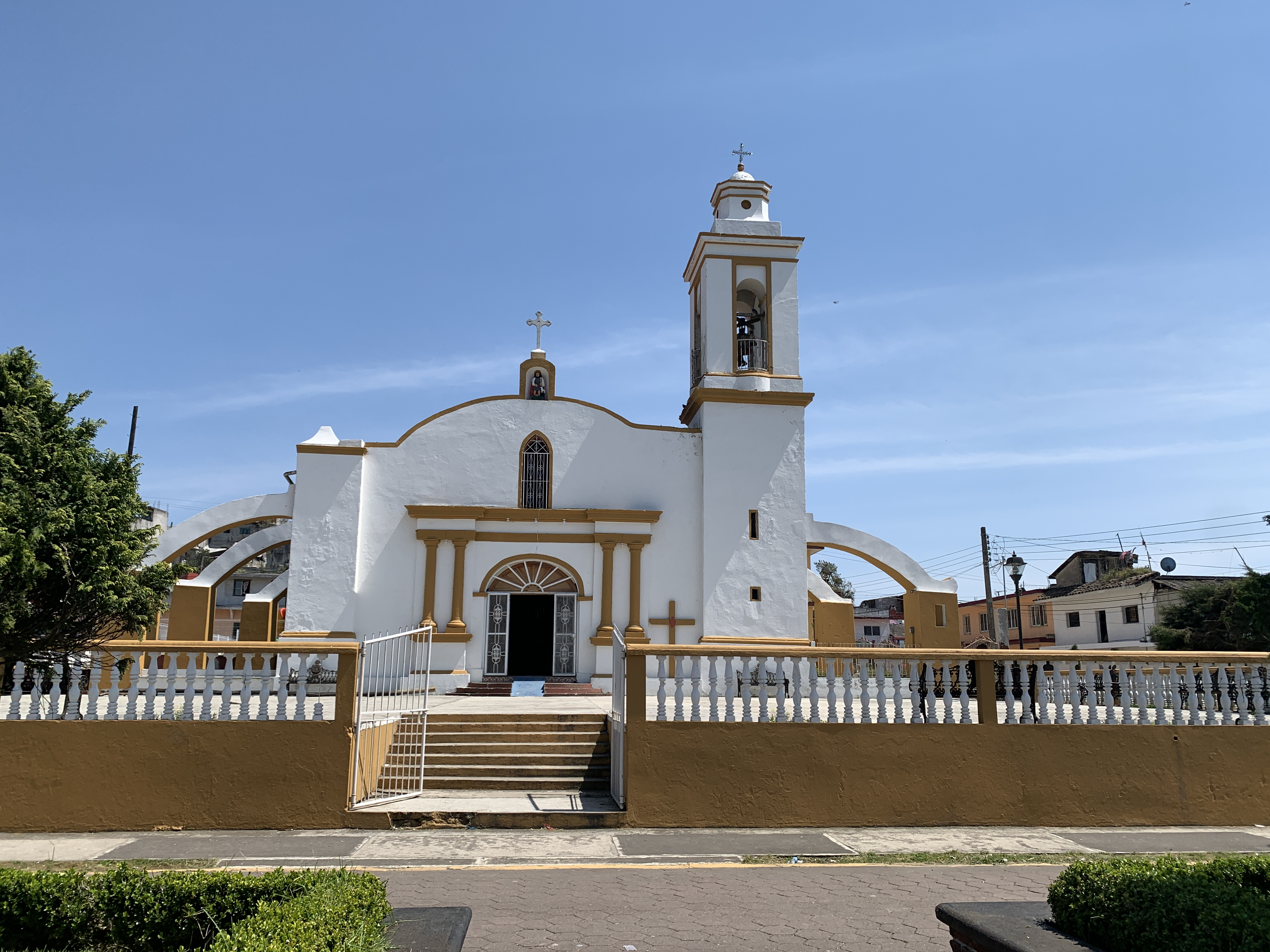
- San Juan Bautista Church

- Location in Mexico Landero y Coss (Mexico)
- Coordinates: 19°44′00″N 96°51′00″W
- Country: Mexico
- State: Veracruz
- Region: Capital Region
- Municipal seat and largest town: Landero y Coss

Government
  - Mayor: Xóchitl Domínguez Rosado (PAN)

Area
  - Total: 17.6 km^{2} (6.8 sq mi)
- Elevation (of seat): 2,029 m (6,657 ft)

Population (2020)
  - Total: 1,543
  - Density: 87.9/km^{2} (228/sq mi)
  - Seat: 1,117
- Time zone: UTC-6 (Central (US Central))
- Postal code (of seat): 93860
- Website: (in Spanish)

Landero y Coss is a municipality in the Mexican state of Veracruz.

== Geography ==
The municipality is located in the central zone of the state, about 33 km from the state capital Xalapa. It has a surface of 21.39 km^{2}. It is located at 19°44′N 96°51′W.

The municipality of Landero y Coss is delimited to the north-east by Misantla to the east by Chiconquiaco, to the south-east by Acatlán, to the south by Miahuatlán and to the west by Tonayan.

The weather in Landero y Coss is warm all year with rains in summer and autumn.

== Demographics ==
Historical population
Year	Pop.	±%
1995	1,599	—
2000	1,432	−10.4%
2005	1,549	+8.2%
2010	1,546	−0.2%
2015	1,534	−0.8%
2020	1,543	+0.6%

With a population of 1,543 inhabitants as of 2020, Landero y Coss is the smallest municipality of Veracruz in terms of population. There are only 3 localities, all of them classified as rural: Landero y Coss, the municipal seat, contains more than 70% of the population (1,117 hab.). The other two localities are Buena Vista (421 hab.); and Raicero (5 hab.).

== Products ==
It produces principally maize, beans, coffee and green chile.

== Culture ==
In Landero y Coss, in June takes place the celebration in honor to San Juan Bautista Patron of the town.
