= Vega de Alatorre =

- Municipality and town
- Interactive map of Vega de Alatorre
- Location in Mexico
- Coordinates: 20°01′43.5065″N 96°38′44.0459″W
- Country: Mexico
- State: Veracruz

Area
  - Total: 310.92 km^{2} (120.05 sq mi)

Population (2005)
  - Total: 18,507
- Time zone: UTC-6 (Central Standard Time)

Vega de Alatorre is a municipality located in the central zone in the Mexican state of Veracruz, about 60 km from the state capital, Xalapa. It has an area of 310.92 km^{2}. It is located at 20°01′43.5065″N 96°38′44.0459″W.

In 2017, the total population of the municipality of Vega de Alatorre was 20,490.

== Geography ==
The municipality of Vega de Alatorre is bordered to the north by Nautla, to the east by Gulf of Mexico, to the south by Juchique de Ferrer and Alto Lucero de Gutiérrez Barrios and to the west by Misantla.

== Economy ==
It produces principally maize, beans, watermelon, green chile, banana, and orange fruit.

== Notable people ==
- Rafael Hernández Ochoa, Governor of Veracruz from 1974-1980.
