= Totutla =

- Municipality and town
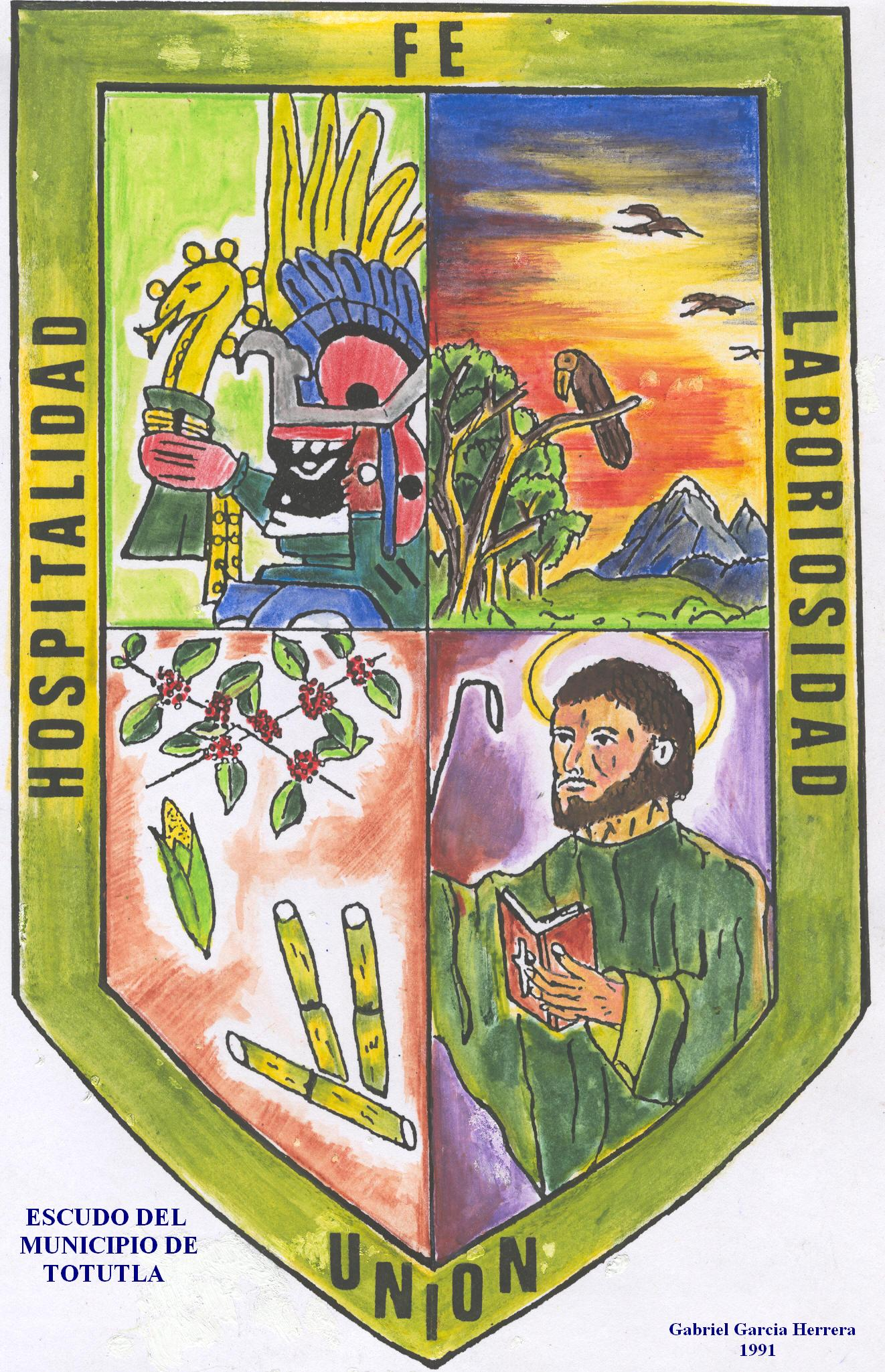
- Coat of arms

- Location in Mexico
- Coordinates: 19°13′N 96°58′W
- Country: Mexico
- State: Veracruz

Area
  - Total: 80.61 km^{2} (31.12 sq mi)

Population (2005)
  - Total: 15,016
- Time zone: UTC-6 (Central Standard Time)

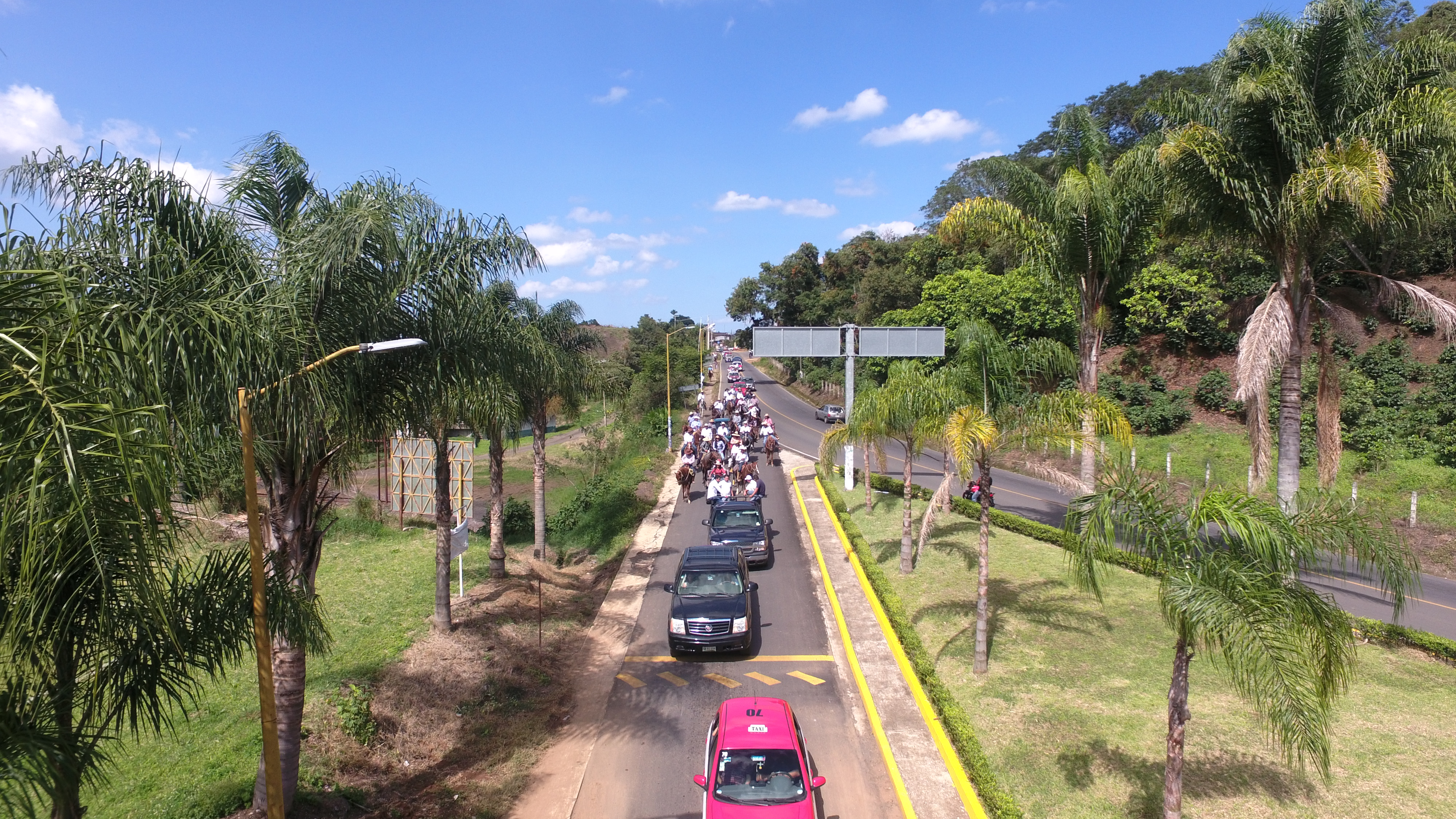
Traditional Horseback Parade in Honor of Saint James the Apostle on July 25th, Totutla

Totutla is a municipality located in the south zone in the Mexican state of Veracruz, about 40 km from the state capital Xalapa. It has an area of 80.61 km^{2}. It is located at 19°13′N 96°58′W. The name comes from the language Náhuatl, Toto-tlan; that means "Among the birds".

== Geography ==
The municipality of Totutla is bordered to the north by Tenampa, to the north-east by Tlacotepec de Mejía and to the south-west by Chiapas State.

=== Climate ===
The weather in Totutla is cold and wet all year with rains in summer and autumn.

Climate data for Totutla (1991–2020 normals, extremes 1959–present)
Month	Jan	Feb	Mar	Apr	May	Jun	Jul	Aug	Sep	Oct	Nov	Dec	Year
Record high °C (°F)	32 (90)	34 (93)	37 (99)	37 (99)	37 (99)	36 (97)	36 (97)	36 (97)	38.5 (101.3)	33 (91)	32 (90)	33 (91)	38.5 (101.3)
Mean daily maximum °C (°F)	20.0 (68.0)	21.5 (70.7)	23.2 (73.8)	25.2 (77.4)	25.7 (78.3)	25.1 (77.2)	24.6 (76.3)	24.4 (75.9)	23.9 (75.0)	23.0 (73.4)	21.5 (70.7)	20.9 (69.6)	23.2 (73.8)
Daily mean °C (°F)	15.5 (59.9)	16.6 (61.9)	18.2 (64.8)	20.2 (68.4)	21.0 (69.8)	20.7 (69.3)	20.1 (68.2)	20.2 (68.4)	19.9 (67.8)	18.8 (65.8)	17.3 (63.1)	16.3 (61.3)	18.7 (65.7)
Mean daily minimum °C (°F)	11.0 (51.8)	11.8 (53.2)	13.2 (55.8)	15.2 (59.4)	16.4 (61.5)	16.3 (61.3)	15.7 (60.3)	15.9 (60.6)	16.0 (60.8)	14.6 (58.3)	13.0 (55.4)	11.8 (53.2)	14.2 (57.6)
Record low °C (°F)	1 (34)	0.5 (32.9)	4 (39)	4 (39)	7.5 (45.5)	6 (43)	10 (50)	10 (50)	9 (48)	7.5 (45.5)	0 (32)	1 (34)	0 (32)
Average precipitation mm (inches)	41.9 (1.65)	41.3 (1.63)	57.8 (2.28)	72.7 (2.86)	162.0 (6.38)	396.5 (15.61)	331.2 (13.04)	381.6 (15.02)	374.9 (14.76)	193.5 (7.62)	80.7 (3.18)	45.1 (1.78)	2,179.2 (85.80)
Average precipitation days	18.6	16.4	17.2	16.0	18.9	24.5	24.4	26.2	26.2	23.8	20.4	20.6	253.2
Source: Servicio Meteorológico Nacional

== Agriculture ==
It produces principally maize, beans, coffee and sugarcane.

== Celebrations ==
In Totutla , in July takes place the celebration in honor to Santiago Apostol, Patron of the town, and in December takes place the celebration in honor to Virgen de Guadalupe.
