= Adolfo Mota Hernández =

Mexican politician

- Born: 31 January 1976 (age 50); Coatepec, Veracruz, Mexico
- Occupation: Politician
- Political party: Institutional Revolutionary Party

Adolfo Mota Hernández (born 31 January 1976) is a Mexican politician from the Institutional Revolutionary Party (PRI). He has served in the Chamber of Deputies on two occasions: during the 60th Congress (2006–2009), and during the 63rd Congress (2015–2018).

== Life ==
Mota graduated with degrees in economics and law from the Universidad Veracruzana and quickly started his political career. In 1998, he became a local deputy to the 58th session of the Congress of Veracruz, where he sat on commissions including Youth and Sports, Economic Development, and Special for Constitutional Reform. During this time, he also taught courses in political communication, civil procedure and business administration at the Universidad Anáhuac and presided over the Veracruz branch of the PRI's Revolutionary Youth Front.

After exiting the state legislature, Mota shifted to the state PRI leadership. He was the state PRI's general secretary—the second-highest position—between 2001 and 2002 and was promoted to president, an office he held until 2004. He left the state party to take a post in the state government as subsecretary of educational and cultural development, which he held from 2004 to 2006.

In 2006, voters in Mota's birthplace of Coatepec sent him back to a legislature, this time the federal Chamber of Deputies, for its 60th Congress, representing Veracruz's 9th district. He was the vice coordinator of the PRI parliamentary group in the Chamber of Deputies and sat on work commissions as well as those dealing with water rights, education, youth and sports, and government. While a federal deputy, he wrote several books, including The Protection of Personal Data in Mexico (2007), and in that same year, he was honored by the National Coalition of Speakers, Poets and Writers United for Mexico with the Guerrero Águila Medal. While a federal deputy, in 2007, Mota watched as PRI supporters toppled a statue of Vicente Fox in Boca del Río, just six hours after it was installed, saying that the statue would "fall just like Saddam Hussein".

In 2010, coinciding with the new state government of Javier Duarte, Mota was named the secretary of education of Veracruz. He served in that capacity until early 2015.

In June 2015, voters in the eighth district of Veracruz — which at the time consisted primarily of rural areas of Xalapa – returned Mota to San Lázaro as a deputy to the 63rd Congress. He presided over the Population Committee and additionally served on those dealing with Culture and Film, as well as Public Education and Educational Services.
