= Tonayán =

- City and municipal seat
- Location in Veracruz Tonayán (Mexico)
- Coordinates: 19°43′12″N 96°54′36″W
- Country: Mexico
- State: Veracruz
- Region: Capital Region

Area
  - Total: 75 km^{2} (29 sq mi)
- Elevation: 1,960 m (6,430 ft)

Population (2020)
  - Total: 5,293

Tonayán is a municipality located in the south zone in the Mexican state of Veracruz, about 20 km from the state capital Xalapa. It has a surface of 74.03 km^{2}. It is located at 19°43′12″N 96°54′36″W.

== Name ==
The name comes from the language Náhuatl, Tonali-tona-yan; that means “Place where it dawns".

== History ==
Tonayán was founded as village between the year 1552 and 1564 when a group of inhabitants of the old village of Misantla established in this place to take care of its boundaries that were feeling threatened by the agrarian invasions of the village of Chapultepec.

== Geography ==
The municipality of Tonayán is delimited to the north by Tenochtitlán, to the east by Landero y Coss, to the south-east by Naolinco and to the west by Coacoatzintla and Tlacolulan. It is watered by small tributary rivers of the river Actopan.

== Agriculture ==
It produces principally maize, beans, potatoes and coffee.

== Celebrations ==
In Tonayán, in June takes place the celebration in honor to San Pedro Apostol, Patron of the town, and in December takes place the celebration in honor to Virgen de Guadalupe.
