= Tepetlán =

- Municipality
- Location in Mexico Tepetlán (Mexico)
- Coordinates: 19°40′00″N 96°48′00″W
- Country: Mexico
- State: Veracruz
- Region: Capital Region
- Municipal seat: Tepetlán
- Largest town: Alto Tío Diego

Government
  - Mayor: Leonardo Daniel Aguilar Hernández (PT)

Area
  - Total: 95.5 km^{2} (36.9 sq mi)
- Elevation (of seat): 2,100 m (6,900 ft)

Population (2020)
  - Total: 9,405
  - Density: 98.5/km^{2} (255/sq mi)
  - Seat: 1,533
- Time zone: UTC-6 (Central)
- Postal codes: 91430
- Area code: 228
- Website: website

Tepetlán is a municipality located in the montane central zone in the Mexican state of Veracruz. It has a surface of 83.90 km^{2}. During the Pre-Hispanic epoch it was inhabited by the Totonac, the most ancient date in the one that one alludes as municipality in that of the 1 °. Of December 1868 in the Cologne it named the village San Antonio Tepetlán, for decree of November 5, 1932, the head-board is called Tepetlán, remaining suppressed the first part of the name.

== Geography ==
The municipality of Tepetlán is delimited by Acatlán, Chiconquiaco, Alto Lucero de Gutiérrez Barrios and Naolinco. The territory of the municipality is watered by small tributary rivers of the river Actópan.

== Agriculture ==
It produces principally maize, beans, green chile, sugarcane and coffee.

== Celebrations ==
In Tepetlán, in June takes place the celebration in honor to San Antonio, Patron of the town, and in December takes place the celebration in honor to Virgen de Guadalupe.

== Demographics ==
Historical population
Year	Pop.	±%
1995	8,155	—
2000	8,455	+3.7%
2005	8,703	+2.9%
2010	9,004	+3.5%
2015	9,668	+7.4%
2020	9,405	−2.7%

In 2020, Teocelo recorded population of 9,405 inhabitantes in 27 localities, all of them rural. Tepetlán, the municipal seat, had a population of 1,533 hab. Other localities include Alto Tío Diego (1,785 hab.), Mafafas (1,465 hab.), Vicente Guerrero (1,019 hab.) and Colonia Ejidal (743 hab.).
