= Chiconquiaco =

Municipality in Mexican state of Veracruz

- Municipality
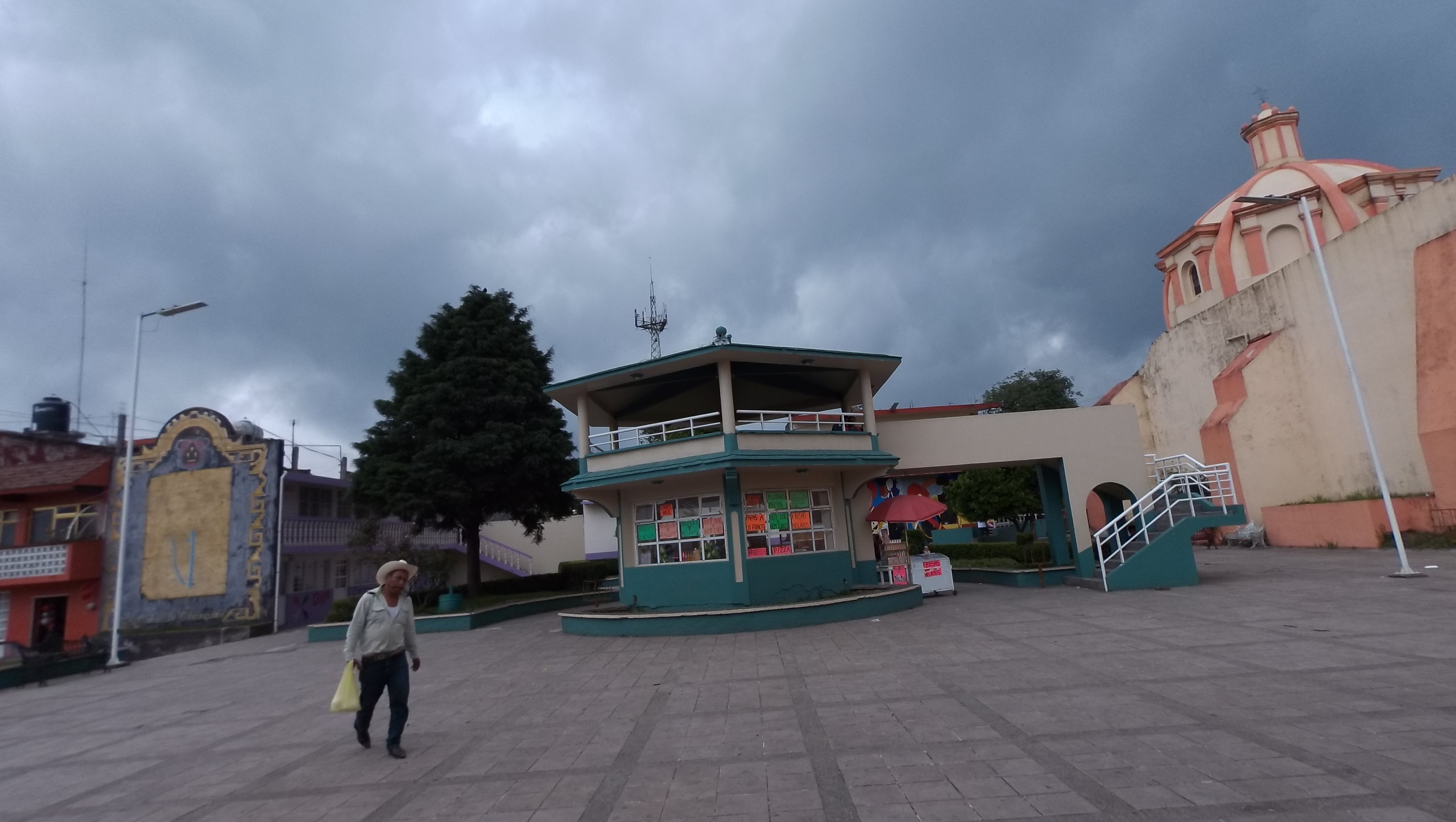
- Chiconquiaco main plaza

- Location in Mexico Chiconquiaco (Mexico)
- Coordinates: 19°45′00″N 96°49′00″W
- Country: Mexico
- State: Veracruz
- Region: Capital Region
- Municipal seat and largest town: Chiconquiaco

Government
  - Mayor: Luis Silvestre Morales Viveros (PVEM)

Area
  - Total: 133.9 km^{2} (51.7 sq mi)
- Elevation (of seat): 2,236 m (7,336 ft)

Population (2020)
  - Total: 13,881
  - Density: 103.7/km^{2} (269/sq mi)
  - Seat: 3,500
- Time zone: UTC-6 (Central (US Central))
- Postal code (of seat): 93880
- Website: (in Spanish) https://www.chiconquiaco.gob.mx/

Historical population
Year	Pop.	±%
1995	11,951	—
2000	12,981	+8.6%
2005	12,516	−3.6%
2010	13,190	+5.4%
2015	14,394	+9.1%
2020	13,881	−3.6%

Chiconquiaco is a municipality in the Mexican state of Veracruz. It is located in the Sierra de Chiconquiaco in the middle of the State of Veracruz. It has a total area of 68.27 km^{2}. It is located at 19°45′N 96°49′W.

== Demographics ==
As of 2020, the municipality had a population of 13,881 inhabitants in 52 localities. About 3,500 inhabitants reside in the municipal seat. Other localities include El Huérfano (pop. 1,694), El Capulín (pop. 937), La Sombra (pop. 901) and Las Paredes (pop. 694).

== Economy ==
It produces principally maize, beans and coffee.

== Culture ==
In Chiconquiaco, in June takes place the celebration in honor of San Pedro and San Pablo, the patron saints of the place.

== Geography ==
The municipality of Chiconquiaco is delimited to the north-west by Misantla, to the north by Yecuatla, to the east by Juchique de Ferrer, to the south-east by Tepetlán, to the south by Acatlán and to the west by Landero y Coss.

=== Climate ===
According to the Köppen climate classification system, Chiconquiaco has a subtropical highland climate (Cfb). Fog occurs on an average of 120.6 days per year, while lightning occurs on 3.6 days. The record high and record low temperatures of 35.0 °C (95.0 °F) and −6.0 °C (21.2 °F) were recorded on September 20, 1967, and January 4, 1979, respectively.

Climate data for Chiconquiaco, Veracruz, Mexico, 1951-2010 normals, extremes 1965-1985
Month	Jan	Feb	Mar	Apr	May	Jun	Jul	Aug	Sep	Oct	Nov	Dec	Year
Record high °C (°F)	26.0 (78.8)	28.0 (82.4)	33.0 (91.4)	32.0 (89.6)	35.0 (95.0)	31.0 (87.8)	30.0 (86.0)	33.0 (91.4)	35.0 (95.0)	32.0 (89.6)	32.0 (89.6)	25.5 (77.9)	35.0 (95.0)
Mean daily maximum °C (°F)	15.3 (59.5)	15.9 (60.6)	19.5 (67.1)	21.2 (70.2)	22.2 (72.0)	20.5 (68.9)	19.6 (67.3)	19.9 (67.8)	19.5 (67.1)	18.0 (64.4)	17.0 (62.6)	15.6 (60.1)	18.7 (65.6)
Daily mean °C (°F)	11.1 (52.0)	11.6 (52.9)	14.4 (57.9)	16.0 (60.8)	17.0 (62.6)	15.9 (60.6)	15.1 (59.2)	15.2 (59.4)	15.1 (59.2)	13.9 (57.0)	12.9 (55.2)	11.7 (53.1)	14.2 (57.5)
Mean daily minimum °C (°F)	6.9 (44.4)	7.2 (45.0)	9.2 (48.6)	10.9 (51.6)	11.8 (53.2)	11.4 (52.5)	10.7 (51.3)	10.6 (51.1)	10.7 (51.3)	9.8 (49.6)	8.8 (47.8)	7.8 (46.0)	9.7 (49.5)
Record low °C (°F)	−6.0 (21.2)	−1.0 (30.2)	−1.0 (30.2)	1.0 (33.8)	5.5 (41.9)	7.0 (44.6)	7.0 (44.6)	8.0 (46.4)	3.0 (37.4)	0.0 (32.0)	1.0 (33.8)	−3.0 (26.6)	−6.0 (21.2)
Average precipitation mm (inches)	72.6 (2.86)	74.9 (2.95)	52.2 (2.06)	46.5 (1.83)	90.7 (3.57)	218.6 (8.61)	195.0 (7.68)	196.3 (7.73)	373.2 (14.69)	165.0 (6.50)	112.5 (4.43)	83.4 (3.28)	1,680.9 (66.19)
Average rainy days	14.4	12.1	9.6	7.9	8.4	14.8	18.2	19.1	19.6	17.0	12.5	13.4	167.0
Source: Servicio Meteorológico Nacional
