= Miahuatlán, Veracruz =

Miahuatlán
- Municipality
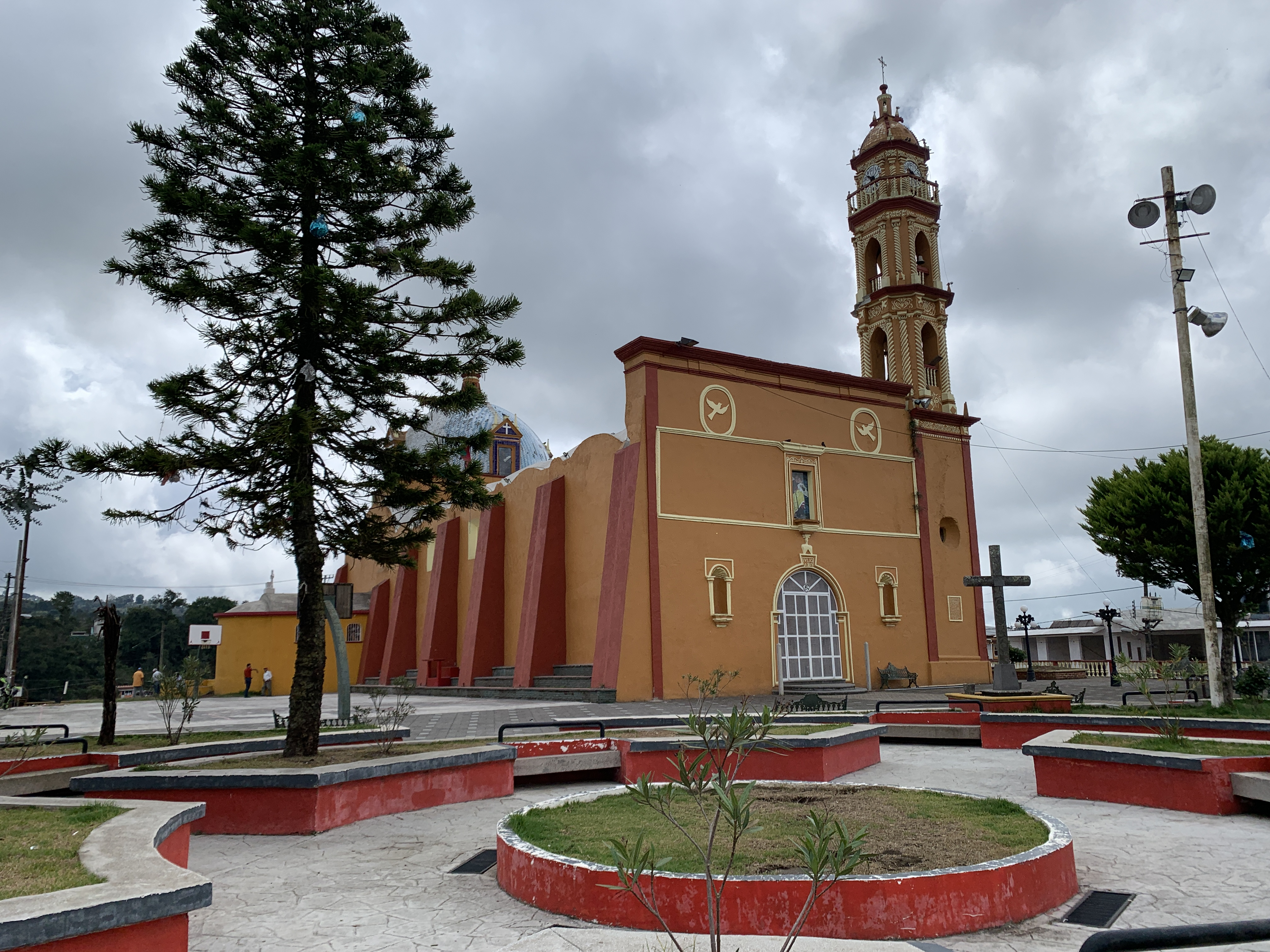
- San José Church

- Location in Mexico Miahuatlán (Mexico)
- Coordinates: 19°42′00″N 96°52′00″W
- Country: Mexico
- State: Veracruz
- Region: Capital Region
- Municipal seat and largest town: Miahuatlán

Government
  - Mayor: Héctor Óscar Suárez Sánchez (FM)

Area
  - Total: 29.4 km^{2} (11.4 sq mi)
- Elevation (of seat): 1,970 m (6,460 ft)

Population (2020)
  - Total: 4,841
  - Density: 164.8/km^{2} (427/sq mi)
  - Seat: 3,667
- Time zone: UTC-6 (Central (US Central))
- Postal code (of seat): 91410
- Website: (in Spanish)

Miahuatlán is a municipality in the Mexican state of Veracruz.

== Geography ==
It is located in montane central zone of the State of Veracruz, about 28 km from state capital Xalapa. It has a surface of 20.56 km^{2}.

Miahuatlán Municipality is delimited to the north by Landero y Coss, to the east by Acatlán Municipality, to the south by Naolinco Municipality and to the west by Tonayán Municipality.

The weather in Miahuatlán is cold all year with rains in summer and autumn.

== Demographics ==
Historical population
Year	Pop.	±%
1995	3,598	—
2000	3,807	+5.8%
2005	4,083	+7.2%
2010	4,429	+8.5%
2015	4,685	+5.8%
2020	4,841	+3.3%

As of 2020, the municipality had a population of 4,841 inhabitants in 13 localities. Miahuatlán, the municipal seat, it's the only considered urban, where 75% of the population resides (3,667 hab.). Other localities include Dos Jacalaes (370 hab.), Cumbre de Jonotal (285 hab.), Yerbabuena (135 hab.) and Carolino Anaya (105 hab.).

== Products ==
It produces principally maize, rice and coffee.

== Events ==
In Miahuatlán, the celebration in honor to San José, Patron of the town takes place in March.
