= Tlaltetela =

Municipality in Mexico

- Municipality
- Coat of arms

- Location in Mexico Tlaltetela (Mexico)
- Country: Mexico
- State: Veracruz
- Demonym: (in Spanish)
- Time zone: UTC−6 (CST)

Tlaltetela is a municipality located in the montane central zone in the Mexican state of Veracruz, about 25 km from the state capital Xalapa. It has a surface of 266.50 km^{2}. It is located at 19°19′N 96°54′W. The name comes from the Náhuatl language tlal- (land) and tetl (rocks). It was formerly called Axocuapan (from Nahuatl Atl-Xoxoc-Apan, meaning "in the acid water". By the decree 373 of May 8, 1979, Axocuapan was renamed Tlaltetela. In 1998, the first recreational park and the municipal library were opened. On July 12, 2020, a curfew was decreed, due to the increase of COVID-19 cases in the municipality, as the first formal quarantine in Mexico.

== Geography ==
The municipality of Tlaltetela is delimited to the north by Jalcomulco, Coatepec and Teocelo, to the east by Puente Nacional, to the south by Huatusco and to the orient by Puebla State. La Antigua is watered by the river.

== Agriculture ==
The area produces principally limes, maize, beans, coffee, sugar cane and mango.

== Celebrations ==
In Tlaltetela, the celebration in honor to San José, Patron of the town, takes place in March, and the celebration in honor to Virgen de Guadalupe takes place in December.
