= Tlacolulan =

Municipality in Veracruz, Mexico

- Municipality
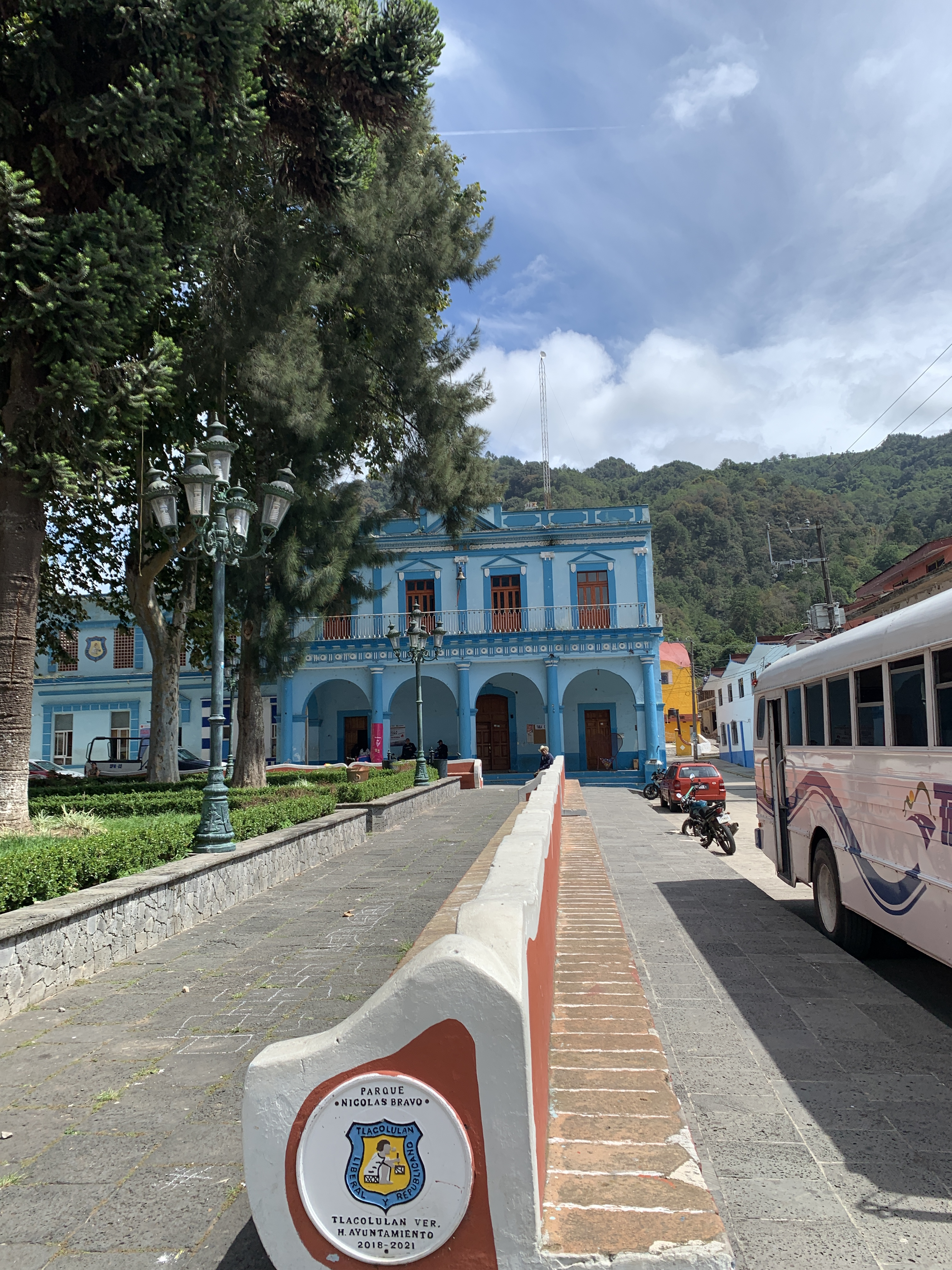

- Location in Mexico Tlacolulan (Mexico)
- Country: Mexico
- State: Veracruz
- Demonym: (in Spanish)
- Time zone: UTC−6 (CST)

Tlacolulan is a municipality in the Mexican state of Veracruz, about 17 km from the state capital Xalapa. It has a surface of 137.36 km^{2}. It is located at 19°40′N 97°00′W. It was inhabited by the totonac pre-Hispanic, of the former ones of Xalapa's region. For decree number 25 of April 14, 1861 the Government of the State, ordered that the people head-board of this municipality names Tlacolulan of the Free ones.

== Geography ==
The municipality of Tlacolulan is delimited to the north by Tenochtitlán, to the east by Coacoatzintla and Tonayan and to the south by Acajete. It is watered by small creeks that are tributaries of the river Actópan.

The weather in Tlacolulan is cold and wet all year with rains all year round.

== Agriculture ==
It produces principally maize.

== Celebrations ==
In Tlacolulan, the celebration in honor to Virgen de la Concepción, Patron of the town, takes place in December, and the celebration in honor to Virgen de la Natividad takes place in September.
