= Actopan River =

River in Mexico

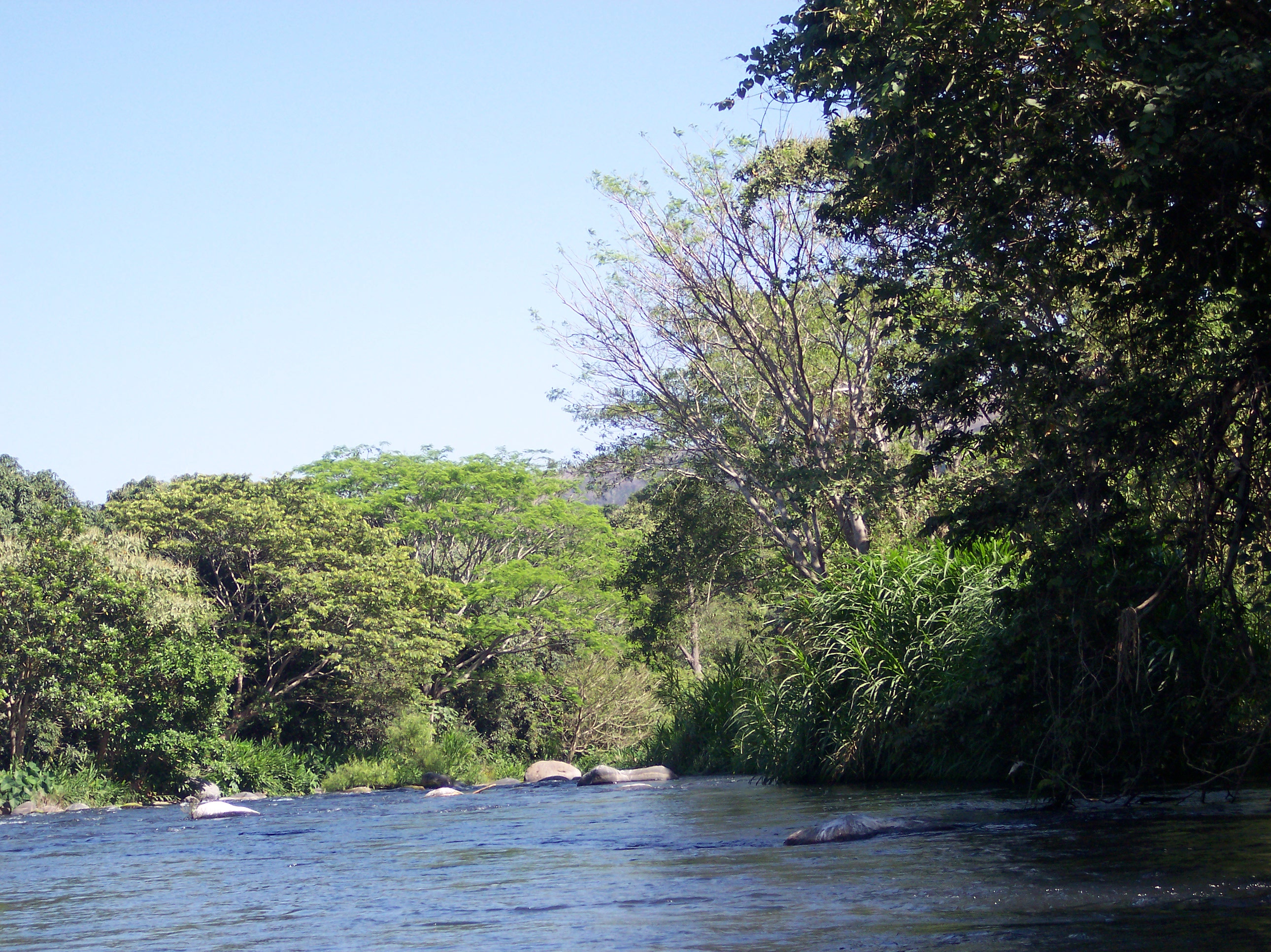

- Location of the mouth Actopan River (Mexico)

Location
- Country: Mexico
- State: Veracruz

Physical characteristics
- Source
  - coordinates: 19.535687°N 96.694279°W
- Mouth: Gulf of Mexico
  - coordinates: 19.417454°N 96.321824°W

The Actopan River is a river of Mexico that reaches the Gulf of Mexico in the state of Veracruz.

== See also ==
- List of rivers of Mexico
