= Acatlán, Veracruz =

Acatlán Municipality
- Municipality
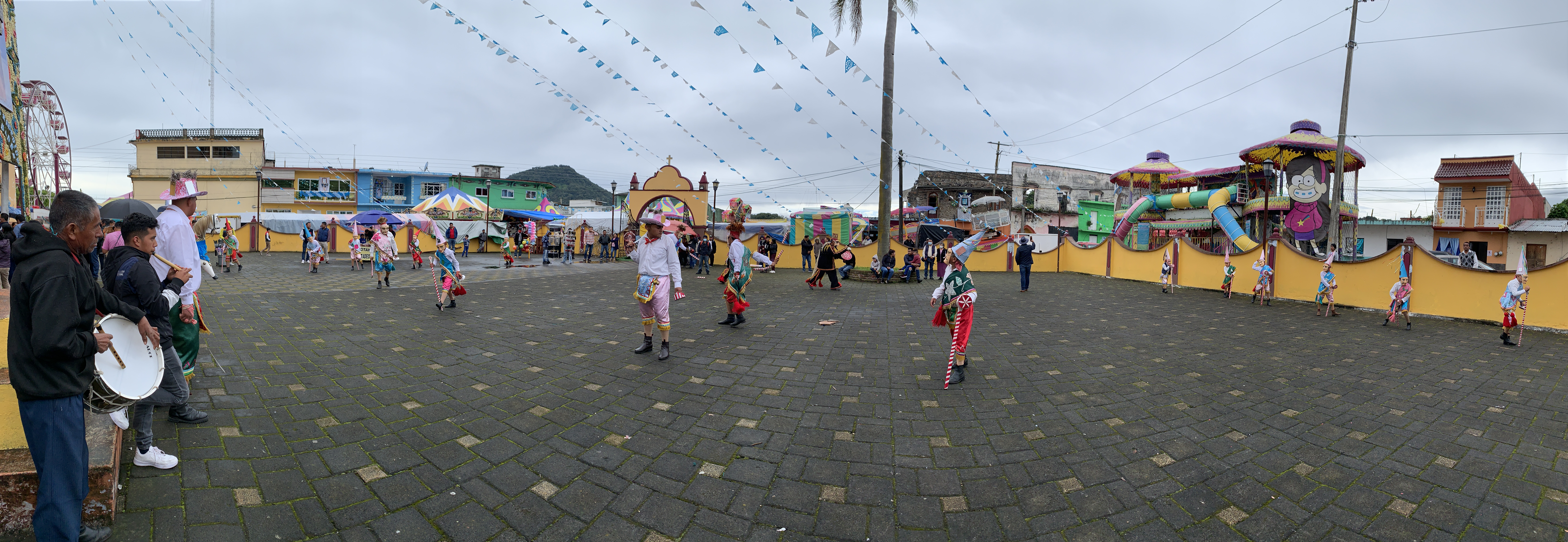
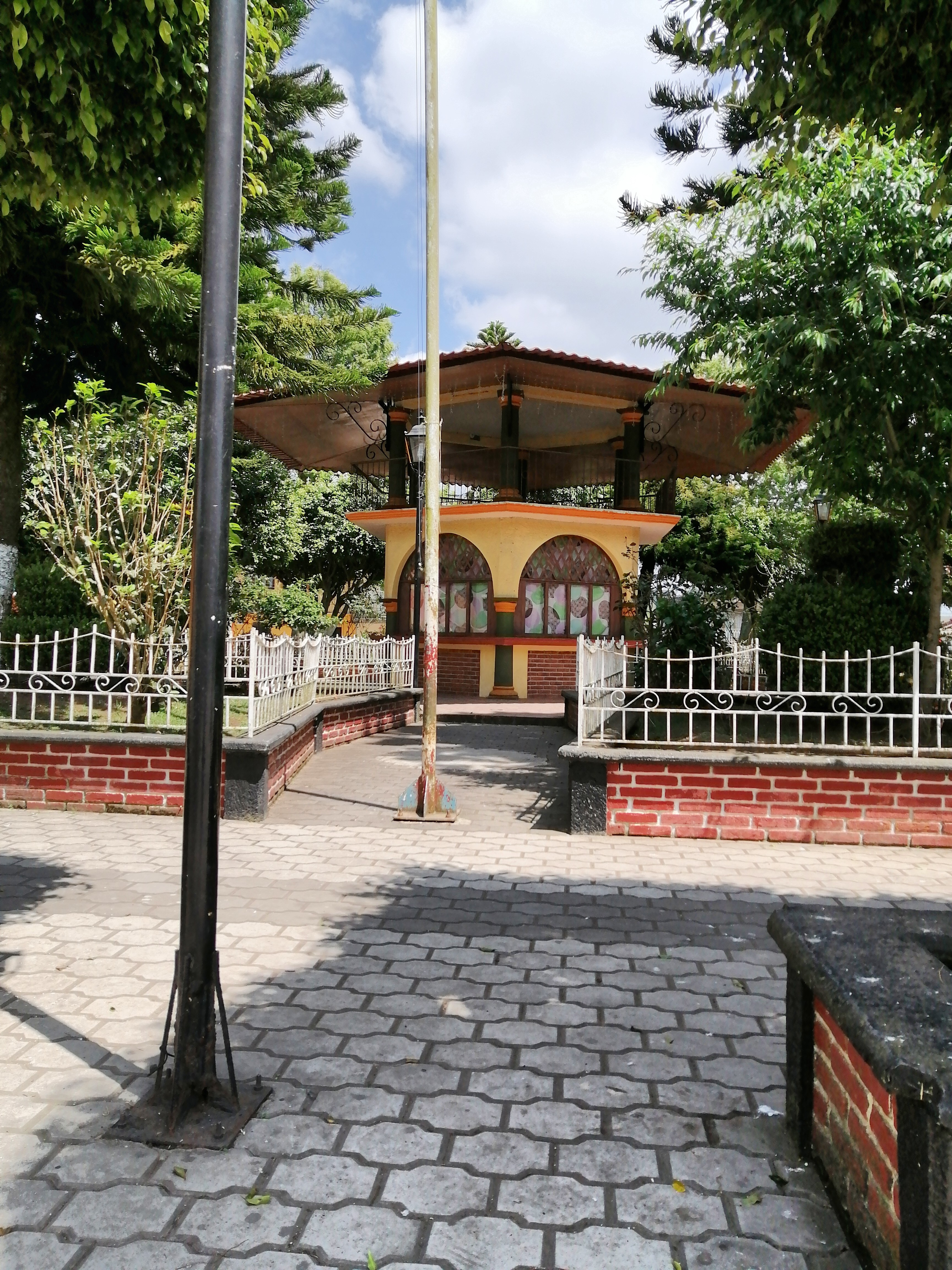
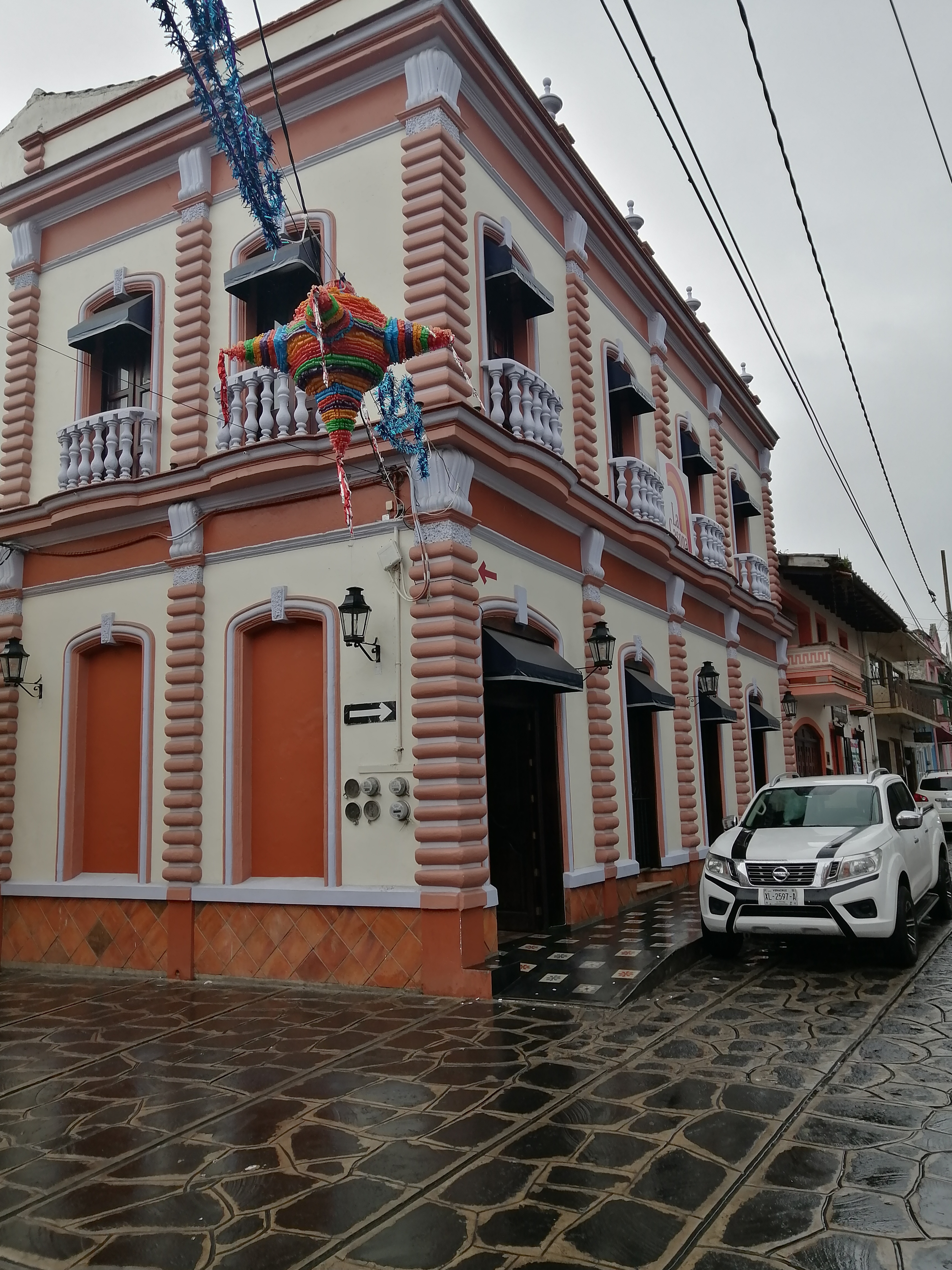
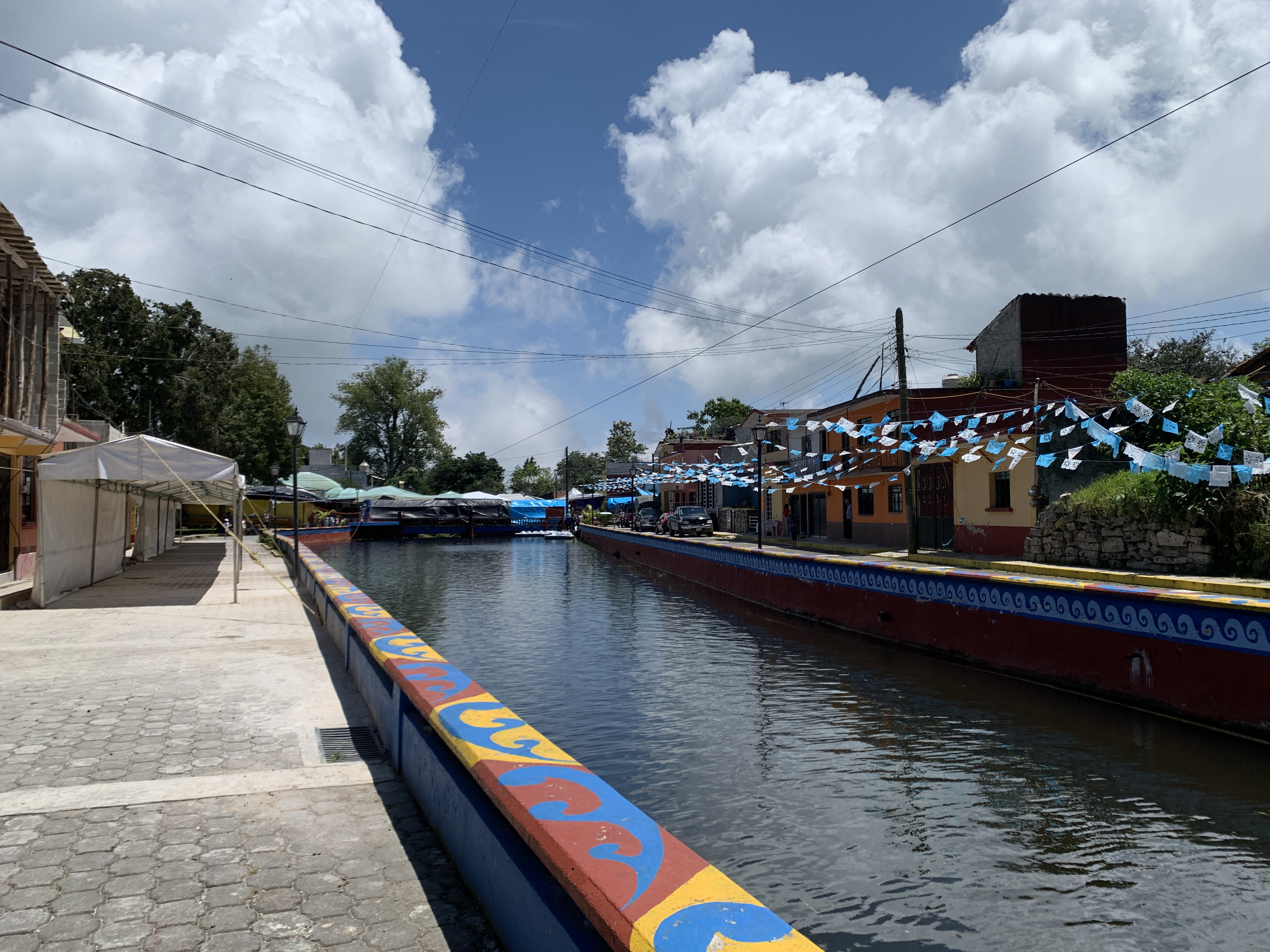
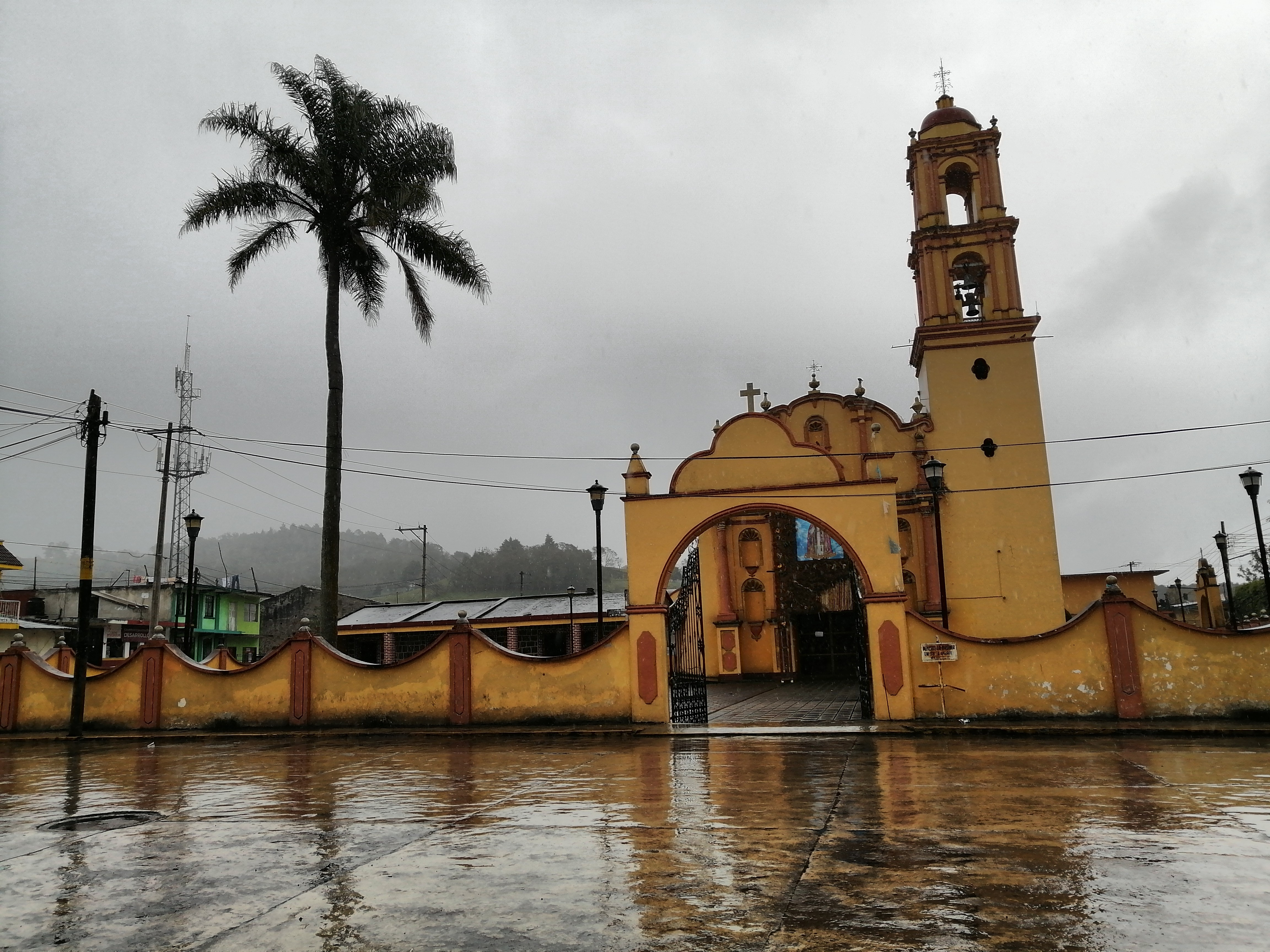
- Top: Acatlán main plaza; Middle: Park at Acatlán downtown, Acatlán Municipal Palace; Bottom: Actopan river, San Pedro Apóstol Church

- Location in Mexico Acatlán Municipality (Mexico)
- Coordinates: 19°41′50″N 96°50′31″W
- Country: Mexico
- State: Veracruz
- Region: Capital Region

Government
  - Mayor: Aquilino Rodríguez Sánchez (PT)

Area
  - Total: 18.1 km^{2} (7.0 sq mi)
- Elevation (of seat): 1,200 m (3,900 ft)

Population (2020)
  - Total: 3,441
  - Density: 189.7/km^{2} (491/sq mi)
  - Seat: 3,253
- Time zone: UTC-6 (Central (US Central))
- Postal code (of seat): 91420
- Climate: ET
- Website: (in Spanish)

Historical population
Year	Pop.	±%
1995	2,644	—
2000	2,658	+0.5%
2005	2,893	+8.8%
2010	3,058	+5.7%
2015	3,147	+2.9%
2020	3,441	+9.3%

Acatlán is a municipality and village located in the central zone of the Mexican state of Veracruz, about 35 kilometres (22 mi) from the state capital Xalapa. The municipality has an area of 18.1 km^{2} (7.0 sq mi). As of 2020, the municipality had a population of 3,441 inhabitants, and more than 94% of the population resided in the municipal seat.

== Geography ==
The municipality of Acatlán is delimited to the east by the Tepetlán, to the south by the Naolinco, to the west by the Miahuatlán, and to the north by Chiconquiaco. It is watered by the rivers Actopan and Pájaro Verde.
