= Puente Nacional, Veracruz =

Municipality in Veracruz, Mexico

- City and municipality
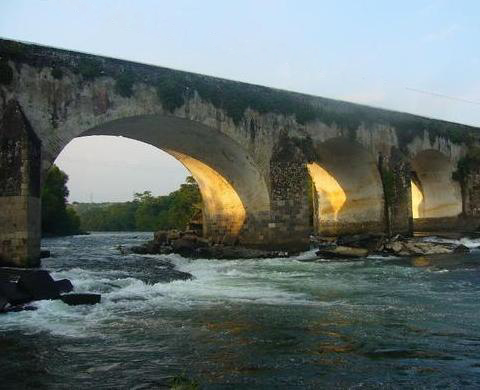
- Puente del Rey

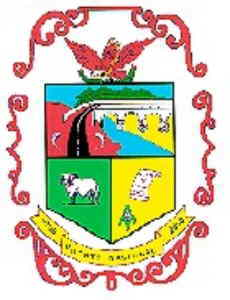
- Coat of arms

- Location in Veracruz Puente Nacional, Veracruz (Mexico)
- Coordinates: 19°18′46″N 96°32′53″W
- Country: Mexico
- State: Veracruz
- Region: Sotavento Region

Area
  - Total: 385 km^{2} (149 sq mi)

Population (2020)
  - Total: 23,544

Puente Nacional is a municipality in the Mexican state of Veracruz. Puente Nacional is bordered by Actopan, the port of Veracruz, and La Antigua. It stands on the railway and on Federal Highways 140 and 125.

== History ==
Nearby the town of Puente Nacional, to its south, is the old National Bridge (Puente Nacional) it is named for. Originally named the Puente del Rey, it was constructed over the Antigua River by the Spanish in 1806 on the camino del Rey (highway of the king), later the National Road, between Veracruz and Mexico City.

During the Mexican–American War the bridge was a key point on the National Road, the American line of communications of their army advancing on Mexico City and a site of several engagements in June, July and August 1847, between Mexican guerrillas and U.S. troops guarding trains of supply wagons that crossed this bridge on their to and from the interior of Mexico in 1847–1848. The location was a bottleneck on the route with topography that lent itself to an ambush by guerrilla forces. Following the capture of Mexico City, General Winfield Scott established posts along the National Road to protect the route from guerrillas, one with 750 men, was located at the Puente Nacional.

== Economy ==
In Puente Nacional the major products are coffee, fruits, and sugar.
