= Alto Lucero =

Alto Lucero Municipality
- City and municipality
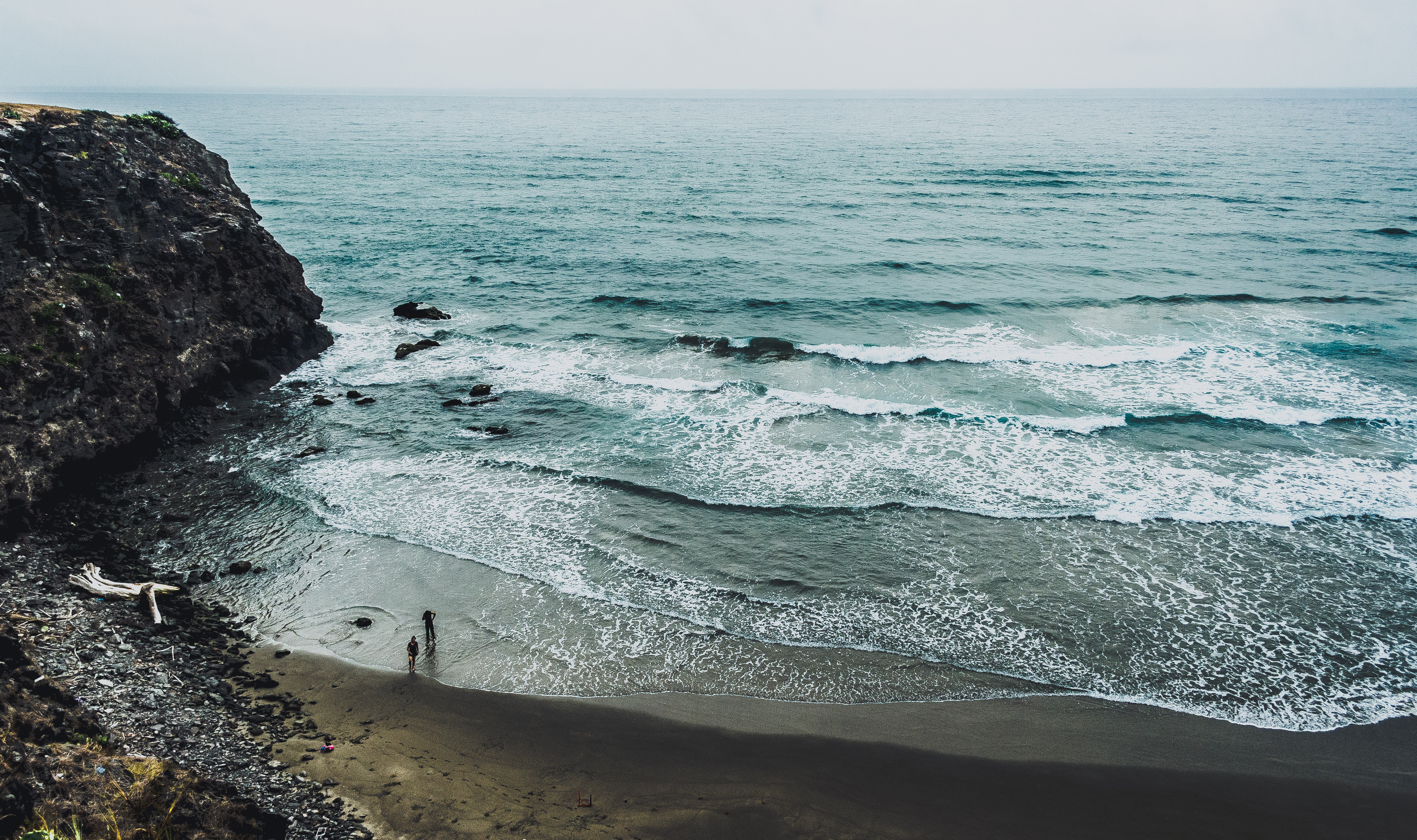
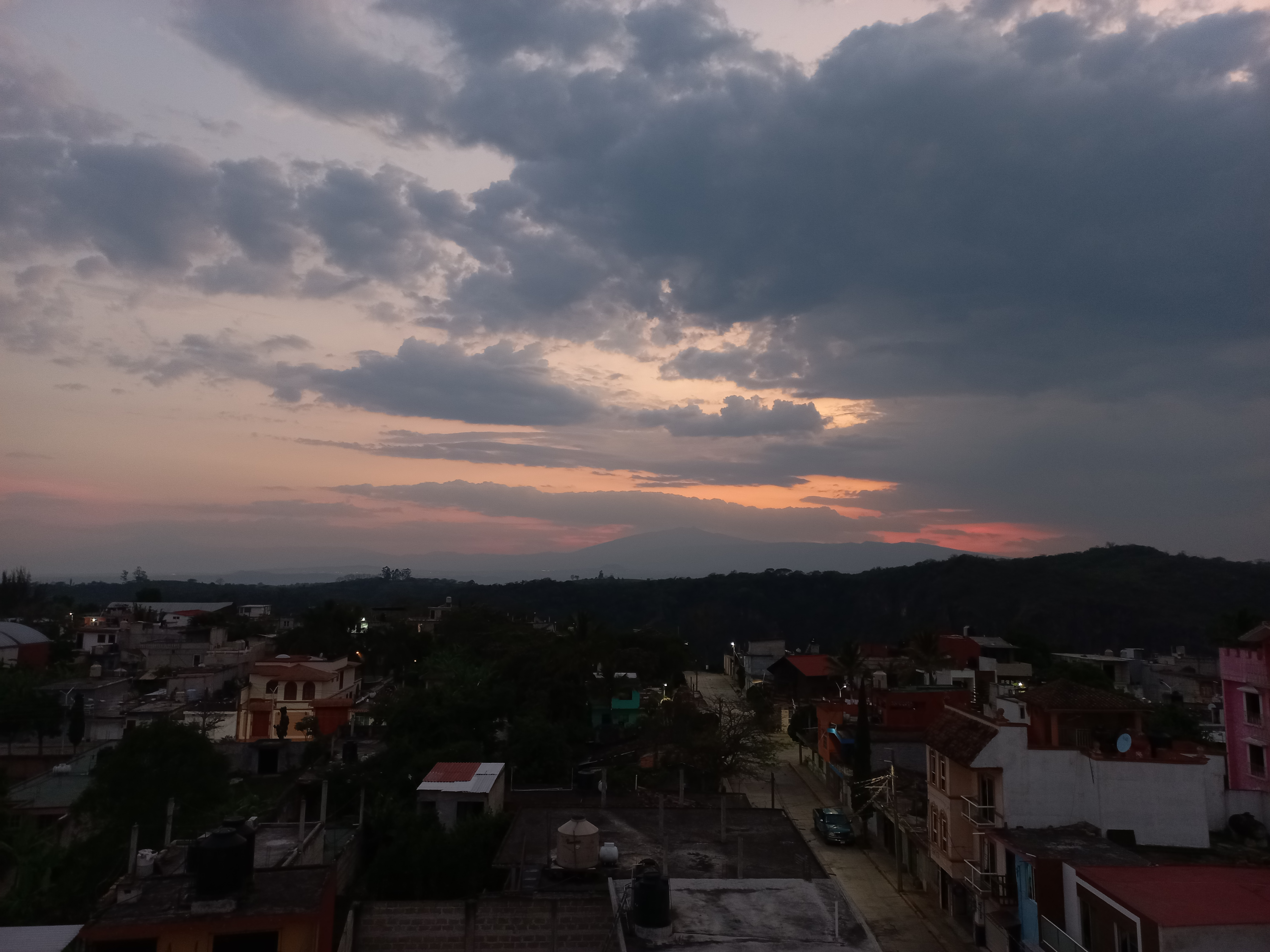
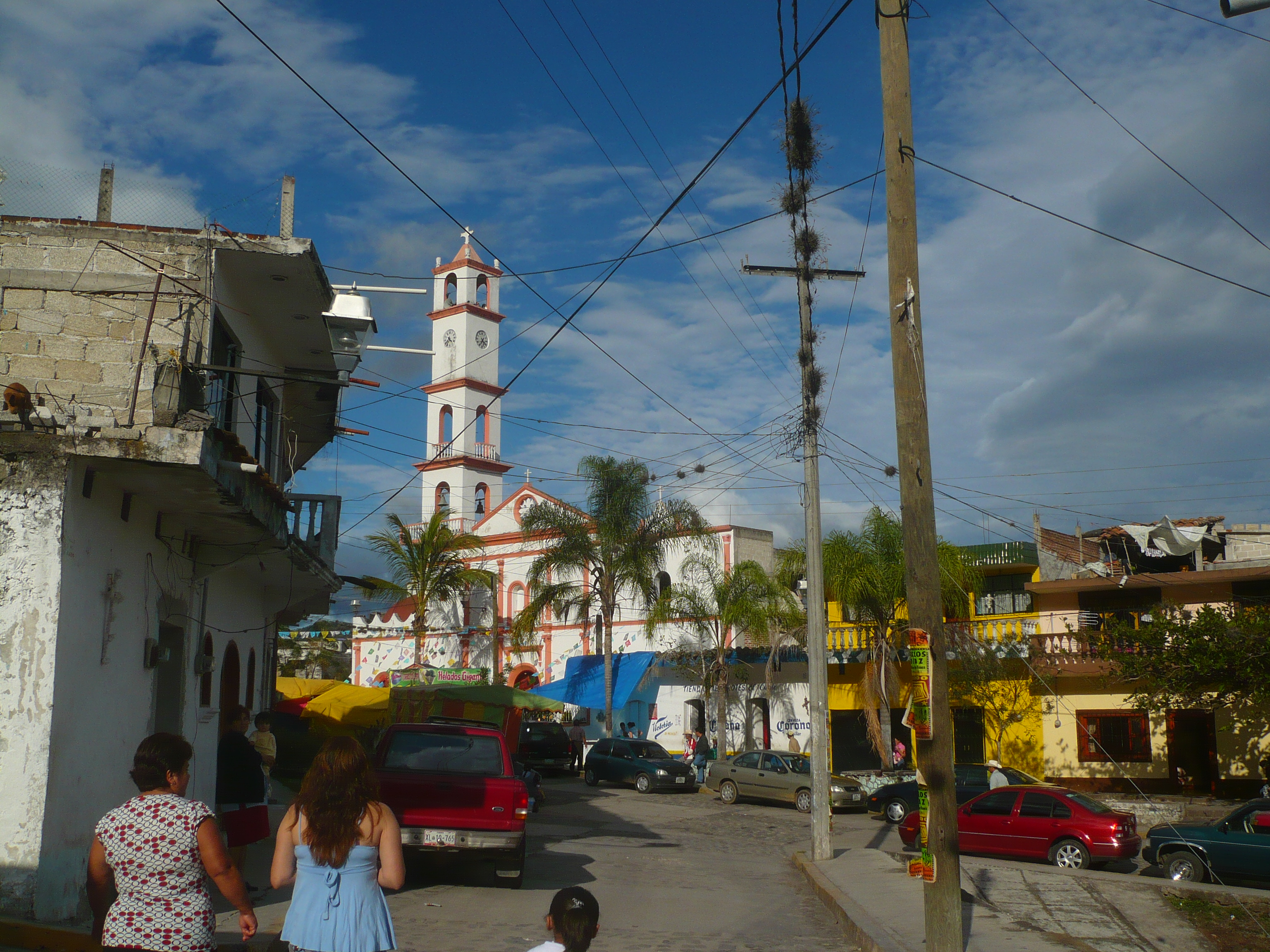
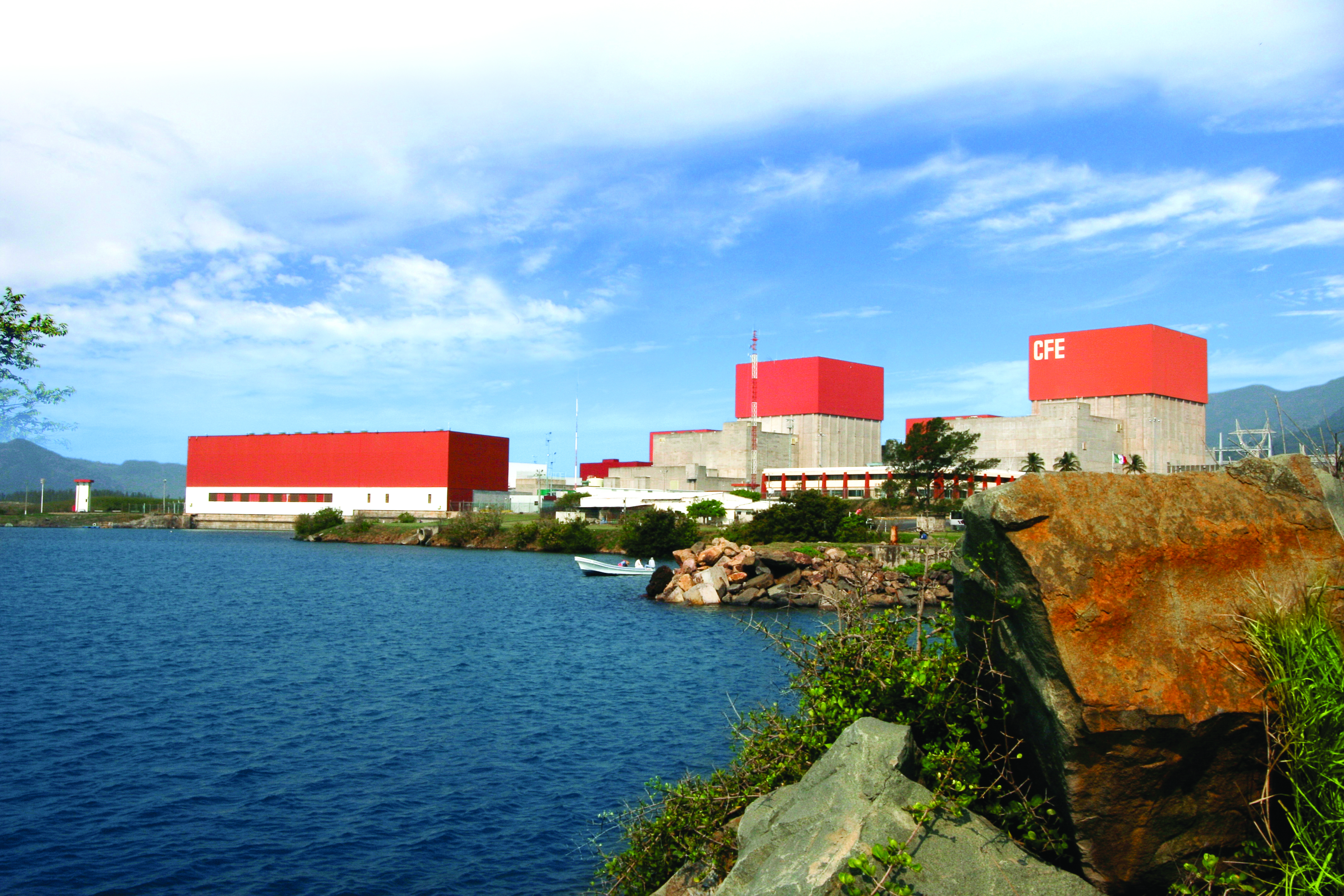
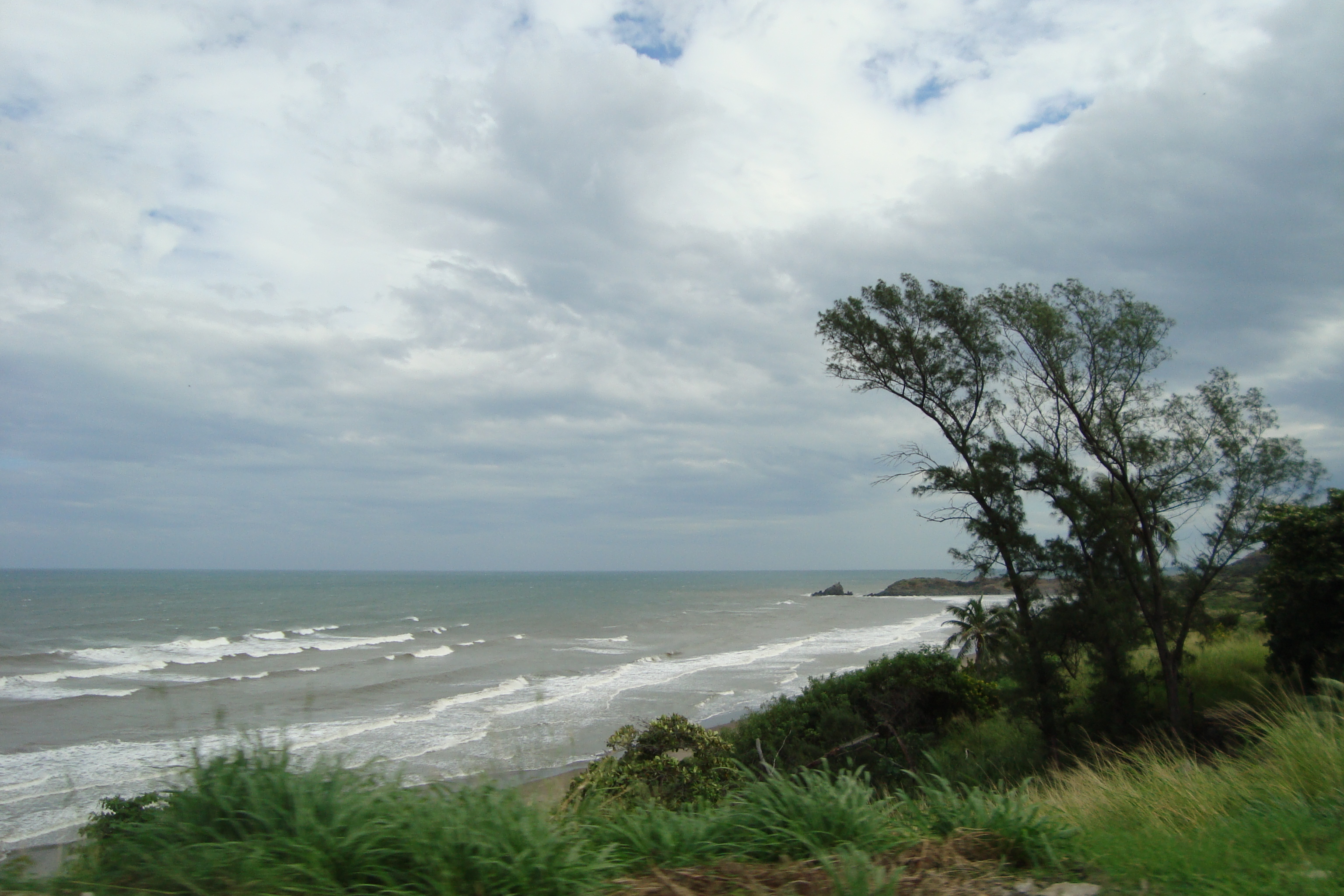
- Top: Palma Sola Beach; Middle: Alto Lucero Downtown, Cerrillos de Diaz; Bottom: Laguna Verde Nuclear Power Station, Boca Andrea Beach

- Location in Mexico Alto Lucero Municipality (Mexico)
- Coordinates: 19°37′29″N 96°44′03″W
- Country: Mexico
- State: Veracruz
- Region: Capital Region

Government
  - Mayor: Luis Vicente Aguilar Castillo (PT)

Area
  - Total: 647.9 km^{2} (250.2 sq mi)
- Elevation (of seat): 591 m (1,939 ft)

Population (2020)
  - Total: 28,184
  - Density: 43.5/km^{2} (113/sq mi)
  - Seat: 5,243
- Time zone: UTC-6 (Central (US Central))
- Postal code (of seat): 91460
- Website: (in Spanish)

Historical population
Year	Pop.	±%
1995	27,331	—
2000	27,188	−0.5%
2005	25,893	−4.8%
2010	28,017	+8.2%
2015	28,922	+3.2%
2020	28,184	−2.6%

Alto Lucero (formally: Alto Lucero de Gutiérrez Barrios) is a city and municipality in the Mexican state of Veracruz. It is located at 19°37′N 96°44′W, some 35 km from state capital Xalapa. The Laguna Verde nuclear power plant, Mexico's only such facility, was built near the town of Punta Limón in Alto Lucero municipality during the 1970s.

It is the birthplace and childhood hometown of famed singer Paquita la del Barrio (1947–2025).

== Demographics ==
As of 2020 the municipality had a population of 28,184 inhabitants in 137 localities. Alto Lucero, the municipal seat, had a population of 5,243 inhabitants. Other localities includes Mesa de Guadalupe (3,439 hab.), Palma Sola (3,227 hab.), Blanca Espuma (1,580 hab.) and La Reforma (1,335 hab.).
