= 7th federal electoral district of Veracruz =

Federal electoral district of Mexico

Veracruz's 7th
- Electoral district of the Chamber of Deputies of Mexico

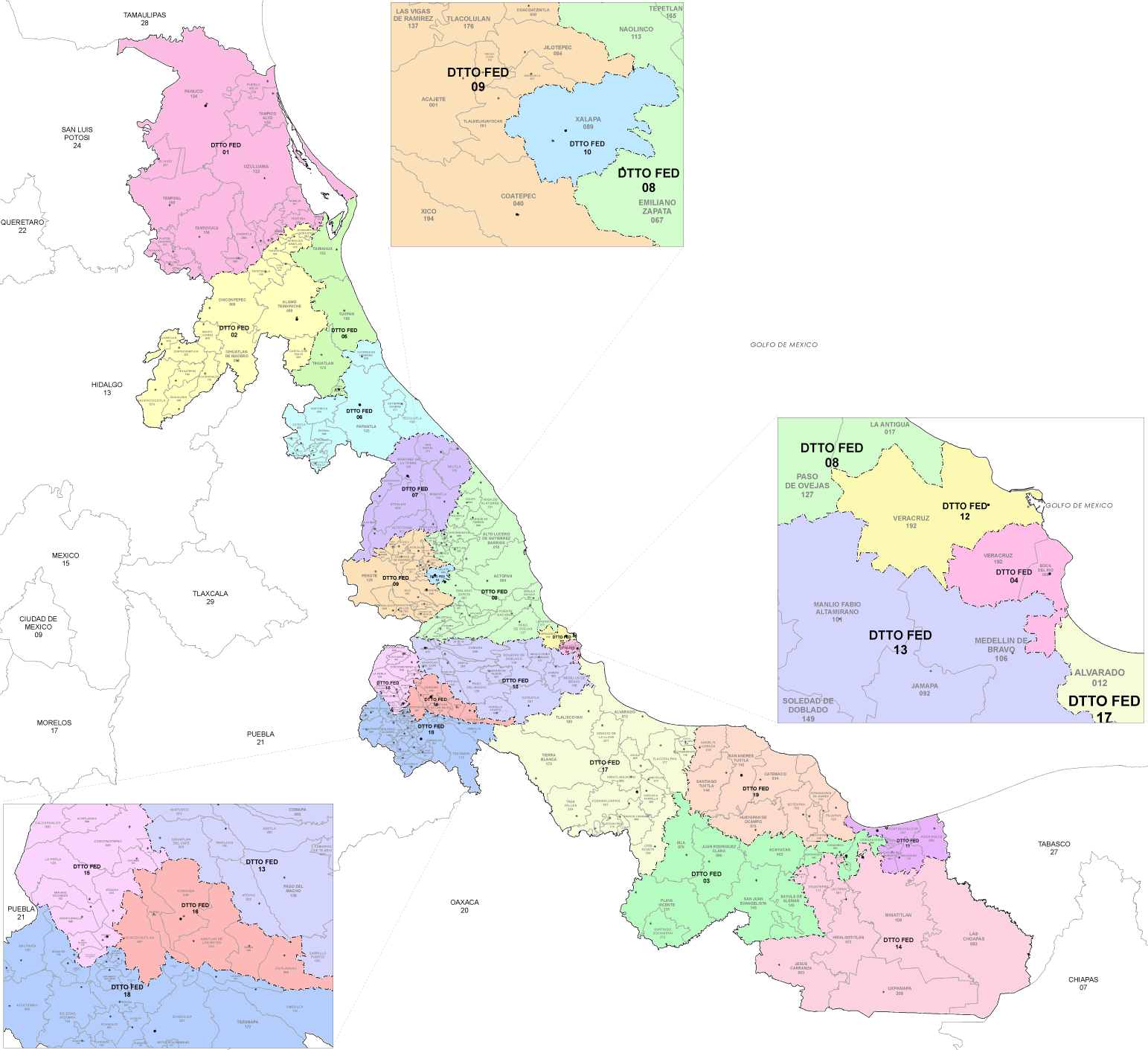
- 7th district since 2023

Incumbent
- Member: Mónica Herrera Villavicencio
- Party: ▌Morena
- Congress: 66th (2024–2027)

District
- State: Veracruz
- Head town: Martínez de la Torre
- Coordinates: 20°4′N 97°3′W
- Covers: Altotonga, Atzalán, Jalacingo, Martínez de la Torre, Misantla, Nautla, San Rafael, Tenochtitlán, Tlapacoyan
- PR region: Third
- Precincts: 276
- Population: 442,013 (2020 census)

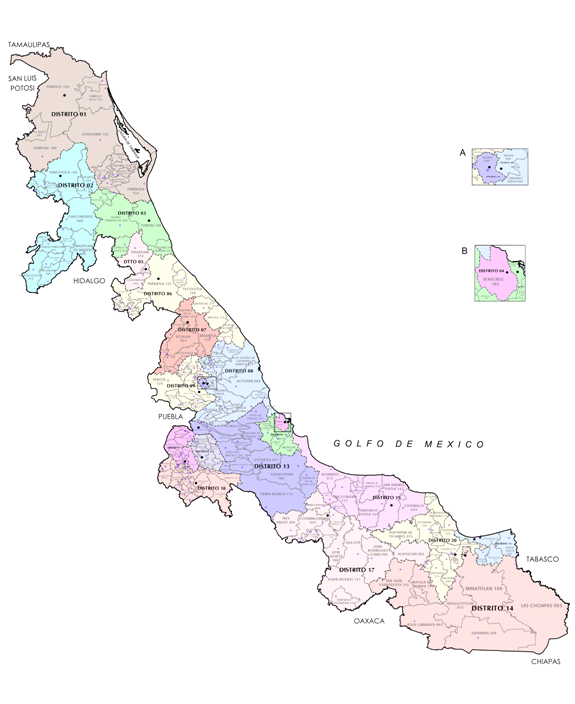
Veracruz under the 2017–2022 districting plan

The 7th federal electoral district of Veracruz (Spanish: Distrito electoral federal 07 de Veracruz) is one of the 300 electoral districts into which Mexico is divided for elections to the federal Chamber of Deputies and one of 19 such districts in the state of Veracruz.

It elects one deputy to the lower house of Congress for each three-year legislative session by means of the first-past-the-post system. Votes cast in this district also count towards the calculation of proportional representation ("plurinominal") deputies elected from the third region.

The current member for the district, elected in the 2024 general election, is Mónica Herrera Villavicencio of the National Regeneration Movement (Morena).

== District territory ==
Veracruz lost a congressional district in the 2023 districting plan adopted by the National Electoral Institute (INE), which is to be used for the 2024, 2027 and 2030 elections. The reconfigured 7th district covers 276 electoral precincts (secciones electorales) across nine municipalities in the central region of the state:

- Altotonga, Atzalán, Jalacingo, Martínez de la Torre, Misantla, Nautla, San Rafael, Tenochtitlán and Tlapacoyan.

The head town (cabecera distrital), where results from individual polling stations are gathered together and tallied, is the city of Martínez de la Torre. The district reported a population of 442,013 in the 2020 census.

== Previous districting schemes ==
Evolution of electoral district numbers
| | 1974 | 1978 | 1996 | 2005 | 2017 | 2023 |
|---|---|---|---|---|---|---|
| Veracruz | 15 | 23 | 23 | 21 | 20 | 19 |
| Chamber of Deputies | 196 | 300 | | | | |

Because of shifting demographics, Veracruz currently has four fewer districts than the 23 the state was allocated under the 1977 electoral reforms.

2017–2022

Between 2017 and 2022, Veracruz was assigned 20 electoral districts. The 7th district comprised nine municipalities in broadly the same region of the state:
- Altotonga, Atzalán, Jalacingo, Las Minas, Martínez de la Torre, Misantla, Tenochtitlán, Tlapacoyan and Villa Aldama.
The head town was at Martínez de la Torre.

2005–2017

Veracruz's allocation of congressional seats fell to 21 in the 2005 redistricting process. Between 2005 and 2017 the district had its head town at Martínez de la Torre and it covered nine municipalities:
- Atzalán, Jalacingo, Landero y Coss, Martínez de la Torre, Misantla, Nautla, Tenochtitlán, Tlapacoyan and San Rafael.

1996–2005

Under the 1996 districting plan, which allocated Veracruz 23 districts, the head town was at Martínez de Alatorre and the district covered 7 municipalities.

1978–1996

The districting scheme in force from 1978 to 1996 was the result of the 1977 electoral reforms, which increased the number of single-member seats in the Chamber of Deputies from 196 to 300. Under that plan, Veracruz's seat allocation rose from 15 to 23. The 7th district had its head town at Coatepec and it covered the municipalities of Actopan, Alto Lucero, La Antigua, Apazapán, Banderilla, Coatepec, Emiliano Zapata, Jalcomulco, Paso de Ovejas, Puente Nacional, Rafael Lucio, Tlalnelhuayocan, Úrsulo Galván and Xico.

== Deputies returned to Congress ==
(Mexico) National parties
- Current
- PAN
- PRI
- PT
- PVEM
- MC
- Morena
- PAZ
- Somos
- Defunct or local only
- PLM
- PNR
- PRM
- PNM
- PP
- PPS
- PARM
- PFCRN
- CON
- PANAL
- PSD
- PES
- PES
- PRD

Veracruz's 7th district
| Election | Deputy | Party | Term | Legislature |
|---|---|---|---|---|
| 1916 | Adolfo G. García | | 1916–1917 | Constituent Congress of Querétaro |
...
| 1973 | Delia de la Paz Rebolledo de Díaz | Institutional Revolutionary Party | 1973–1976 | 49th Congress |
| 1976 | Daniel Nogueira Huerta | Institutional Revolutionary Party | 1976–1979 | 50th Congress |
| 1979 | Carlos Roberto Smith Véliz | Institutional Revolutionary Party | 1979–1982 | 51st Congress |
| 1982 | Servando Díaz Suárez | Institutional Revolutionary Party | 1982–1985 | 52nd Congress |
| 1985 | Carlos Roberto Smith Véliz | Institutional Revolutionary Party | 1985–1988 | 53rd Congress |
| 1988 | Dionisio Pérez Jácome | Institutional Revolutionary Party | 1988–1991 | 54th Congress |
| 1991 | Salvador Valencia Carmona | Institutional Revolutionary Party | 1991–1994 | 55th Congress |
| 1994 | Servando Andrés Díaz Suárez | Institutional Revolutionary Party | 1994–1997 | 56th Congress |
| 1997 | Gonzalo Morgado Huesca | Institutional Revolutionary Party | 1997–2000 | 57th Congress |
| 2000 | Pedro Manterola Sáinz | Institutional Revolutionary Party | 2000–2003 | 58th Congress |
| 2003 | Guillermo Zorrilla Fernández | Institutional Revolutionary Party | 2003–2006 | 59th Congress |
| 2006 | José de la Torre Sánchez; María de Jesús Martínez Díaz | National Action Party (Mexico) | 2006–2009 | 60th Congress |
| 2009 | Alba Leonila Méndez Herrera | National Action Party (Mexico) | 2009–2012 | 61st Congress |
| 2012 | Verónica Carreón Cervantes (Note: Carreón Cervantes switched allegiance from the PVEM to the PRI on 4 September 2012.) | Ecologist Green Party of Mexico Institutional Revolutionary Party | 2012–2015 | 62nd Congress |
| 2015 | Édgar Spinoso Carrera (Note: Spinoso Carrera left the PVEM group in Congress on 28 November 2017.) | Ecologist Green Party of Mexico Independent politician | 2015–2018 | 63rd Congress |
| 2018 | Rodrigo Calderón Salas | National Regeneration Movement | 2018–2021 | 64th Congress |
| 2021 | Mónica Herrera Villavicencio; María Fernanda Lima Buenrostro; Mónica Herrera Villavicencio | National Regeneration Movement | 2021–2024; 2024; 2024 | 65th Congress |
| 2024 | Mónica Herrera Villavicencio | National Regeneration Movement | 2024–2027 | 66th Congress |

== Presidential elections ==
Veracruz's 7th district
| Election | District won by | Party or coalition | % |
|---|---|---|---|
| 2018 | Andrés Manuel López Obrador | Juntos Haremos Historia | 55.1254 |
| 2024 | Claudia Sheinbaum Pardo | Sigamos Haciendo Historia | 71.1019 |
