= 9th federal electoral district of Veracruz =

Federal electoral district of Mexico

Veracruz's 9th
- Electoral district of the Chamber of Deputies of Mexico

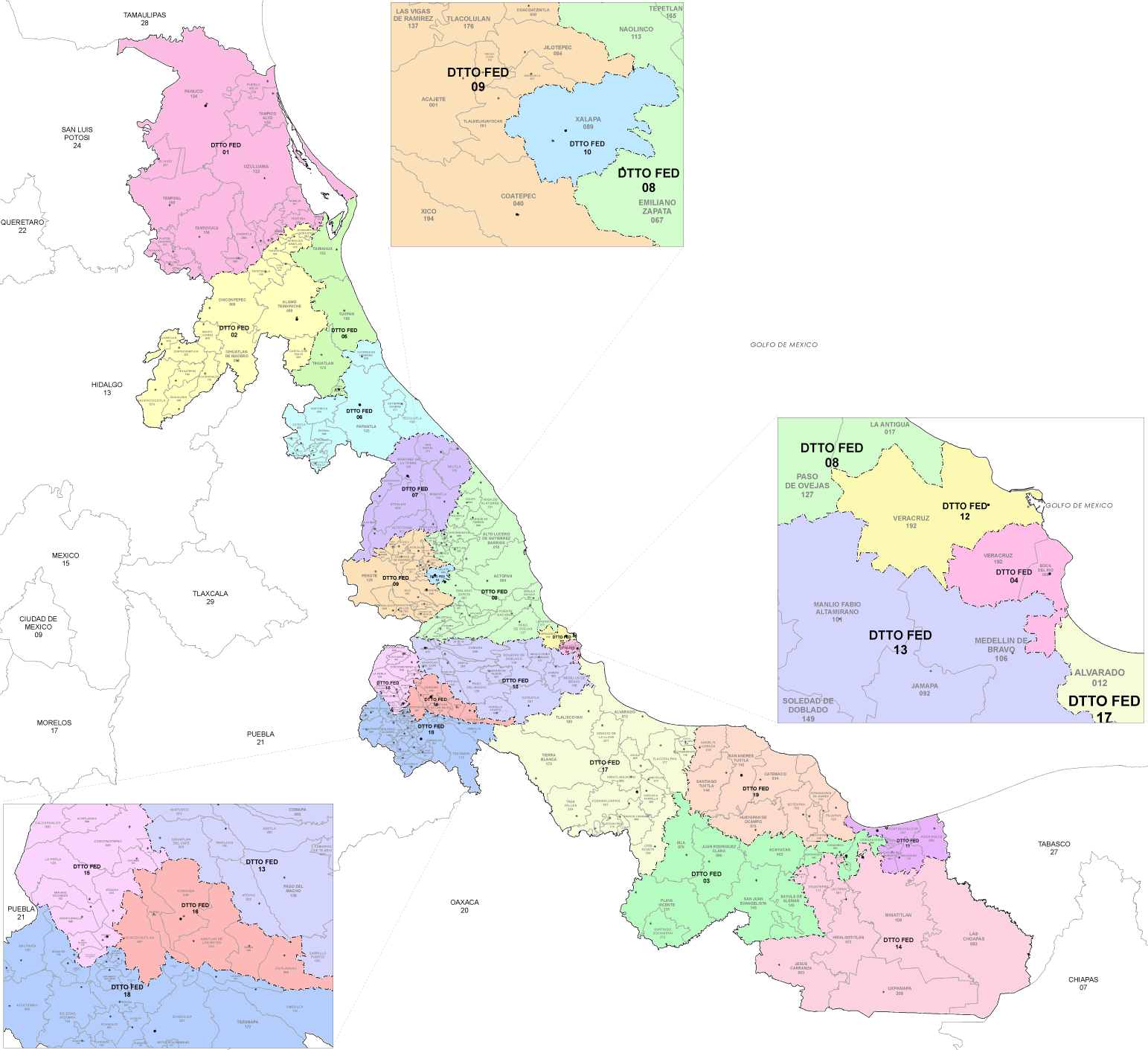
- 9th district since 2023

Incumbent
- Member: Adrián González Naveda
- Party: ▌Labour Party
- Congress: 66th (2024–2027)

District
- State: Veracruz
- Head town: Coatepec
- Coordinates: 19°27′N 96°57′W
- Covers: 18 municipalities: Acajete, Ayahualulco, Banderilla, Coacoatzintla, Coatepec, Cosautlán de Carvajal, Ixhuacán de los Reyes, Jilotepec, Las Minas, Las Vigas de Ramírez, Perote, Rafael Lucio, Tatatila, Teocelo, Tlacolulan, Tlalnelhuayocan, Villa Aldama, Xico
- PR region: Third
- Precincts: 193
- Population: 428,556 (2020 census)

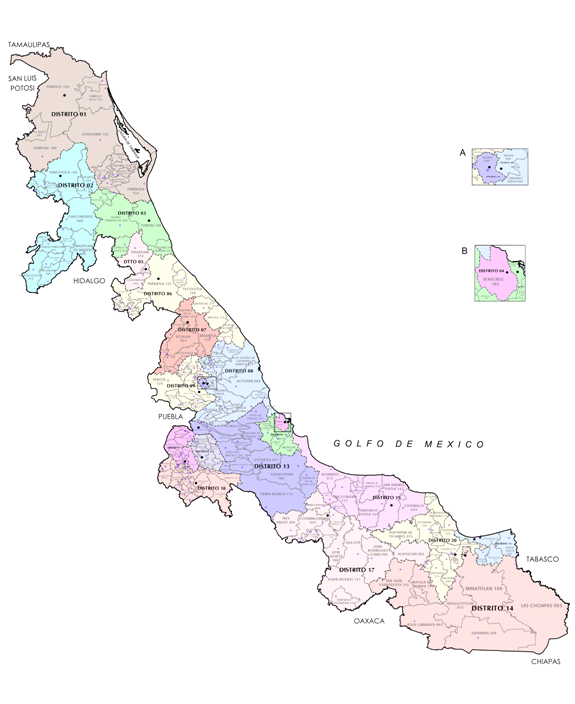
Veracruz under the 2017–2022 districting plan

The 9th federal electoral district of Veracruz (Spanish: Distrito electoral federal 09 de Veracruz) is one of the 300 electoral districts into which Mexico is divided for elections to the federal Chamber of Deputies and one of 19 such districts in the state of Veracruz.

It elects one deputy to the lower house of Congress for each three-year legislative session by means of the first-past-the-post system. Votes cast in the district also count towards the calculation of proportional representation ("plurinominal") deputies elected from the third region.

The current member for the district, elected in the 2024 general election, is Adrián González Naveda. Originally elected for the National Regeneration Movement (Morena), he switched allegiance to the Labour Party (PT) on 19 September 2024.

== District territory ==
Veracruz lost a congressional district in the 2023 districting plan adopted by the National Electoral Institute (INE), which is to be used for the 2024, 2027 and 2030 elections. The reconfigured 9th district comprises 193 electoral precincts (secciones electorales) across 18 municipalities surrounding the state capital, Xalapa, to the west:

- Acajete, Ayahualulco, Banderilla, Coacoatzintla, Coatepec, Cosautlán de Carvajal, Ixhuacán de los Reyes, Jilotepec, Las Minas, Las Vigas de Ramírez, Perote, Rafael Lucio, Tatatila, Teocelo, Tlacolulan, Tlalnelhuayocan, Villa Aldama and Xico.

The head town (cabecera distrital), where results from individual polling stations are gathered together and tallied, is the city of Coatepec. The district reported a population of 428,556 in the 2020 census.

== Previous districting schemes ==
Evolution of electoral district numbers
	1974	1978	1996	2005	2017	2023
Veracruz	15	23	23	21	20	19
Chamber of Deputies	196	300				

Because of shifting demographics, Veracruz currently has four fewer districts than the 23 the state was allocated under the 1977 electoral reforms.

2017–2022

Between 2017 and 2022, Veracruz was assigned 20 electoral districts. The 9th district comprised 16 municipalities in the same region of the state: the same group as in the 2022 plan but without Las Minas and Villa Aldama, both of which were assigned to the 7th district. Its head town was at Coatepec.

2005–2017

Veracruz's allocation of congressional seats fell to 21 in the 2005 redistricting process. Between 2005 and 2017 the district had its head town at Coatepec and it covered 17 municipalities:
- Acajete, Altotonga, Ayahualulco, Coacoatzintla, Coatepec, Cosautlán de Carvajal, Ixhuacán de los Reyes, Las Minas, Perote, Rafael Lucio, Las Vigas de Ramírez, Tatatila, Teocelo, Tlacolulan, Tlalnelhuayocan, Villa Aldama and Xico.

1996–2005

Under the 1996 districting plan, which allocated Veracruz 23 districts, the head town was at Perote and the district covered 16 municipalities.

1978–1996

The districting scheme in force from 1978 to 1996 was the result of the 1977 electoral reforms, which increased the number of single-member seats in the Chamber of Deputies from 196 to 300. Under that plan, Veracruz's seat allocation rose from 15 to 23. The 9th district had its head town at Orizaba and it covered the municipalities of Aquila, Atzacán, Huiloapan, Ixhuatlancillo, Maltrata, Mariano Escobedo, Nogales, Orizaba, La Perla, Rafael Delgado and Río Blanco.

== Deputies returned to Congress ==
(Mexico) National parties
- Current
- PAN
- PRI
- PT
- PVEM
- MC
- Morena
- PAZ
- Somos
- Defunct or local only
- PLM
- PNR
- PRM
- PNM
- PP
- PPS
- PARM
- PFCRN
- CON
- PANAL
- PSD
- PES
- PES
- PRD

Veracruz's 9th district
Election	Deputy	Party	Term	Legislature
1916	Alfredo Solares		1916–1917	Constituent Congress of Querétaro
...
1973	Rogelio García González	Institutional Revolutionary Party	1973–1976	49th Congress
1976	Mario Martínez Dector	Institutional Revolutionary Party	1976–1979	50th Congress
1979	Miguel Castro Elías	Institutional Revolutionary Party	1979–1982	51st Congress
1982	Daniel Sierra Rivera	Institutional Revolutionary Party	1982–1985	52nd Congress
1985	Sergio Roa Fernández	Institutional Revolutionary Party	1985–1988	53rd Congress
1988	Alberto Andrade Rodríguez	Institutional Revolutionary Party	1988–1991	54th Congress
1991	Isaías Álvaro Rodríguez Vivas	Institutional Revolutionary Party	1991–1994	55th Congress
1994	Marcelo Ramírez Ramírez	Institutional Revolutionary Party	1994–1997	56th Congress
1997	Irma Chedraui Obeso	Institutional Revolutionary Party	1997–2000	57th Congress
2000	José Francisco Yunes Zorrilla	Institutional Revolutionary Party	2000–2003	58th Congress
2003	Ernesto Alarcón Trujillo	Institutional Revolutionary Party	2003–2006	59th Congress
2006	Adolfo Mota Hernández	Institutional Revolutionary Party	2006–2009	60th Congress
2009	José Francisco Yunes Zorrilla	Institutional Revolutionary Party	2009–2012	61st Congress
2012	Fernando Charleston Hernández	Institutional Revolutionary Party	2012–2015	62nd Congress
2015	Noemí Guzmán Lagunes	Institutional Revolutionary Party	2015–2018	63rd Congress
2018	Carmen Mora García	National Regeneration Movement	2018–2021	64th Congress
2021	José Francisco Yunes Zorrilla (Note: Yunes Zorrilla resigned his seat on 12 December 2023 to contend (unsuccessfully) for the governorship of Veracruz.); Norma Graciela Treviño Badillo	Institutional Revolutionary Party	2021–2023; 2023–2024	65th Congress
2024	Adrián González Naveda (Note: Originally elected for Morena, he switched allegiance to the PT on 19 September 2024.)	National Regeneration Movement Labour Party (Mexico)	2024–2027	66th Congress

== Presidential elections ==
Veracruz's 9th district
Election	District won by	Party or coalition	%
2018	Andrés Manuel López Obrador	Juntos Haremos Historia	48.1406
2024	Claudia Sheinbaum Pardo	Sigamos Haciendo Historia	63.8449
