= Altotonga =

- Municipality
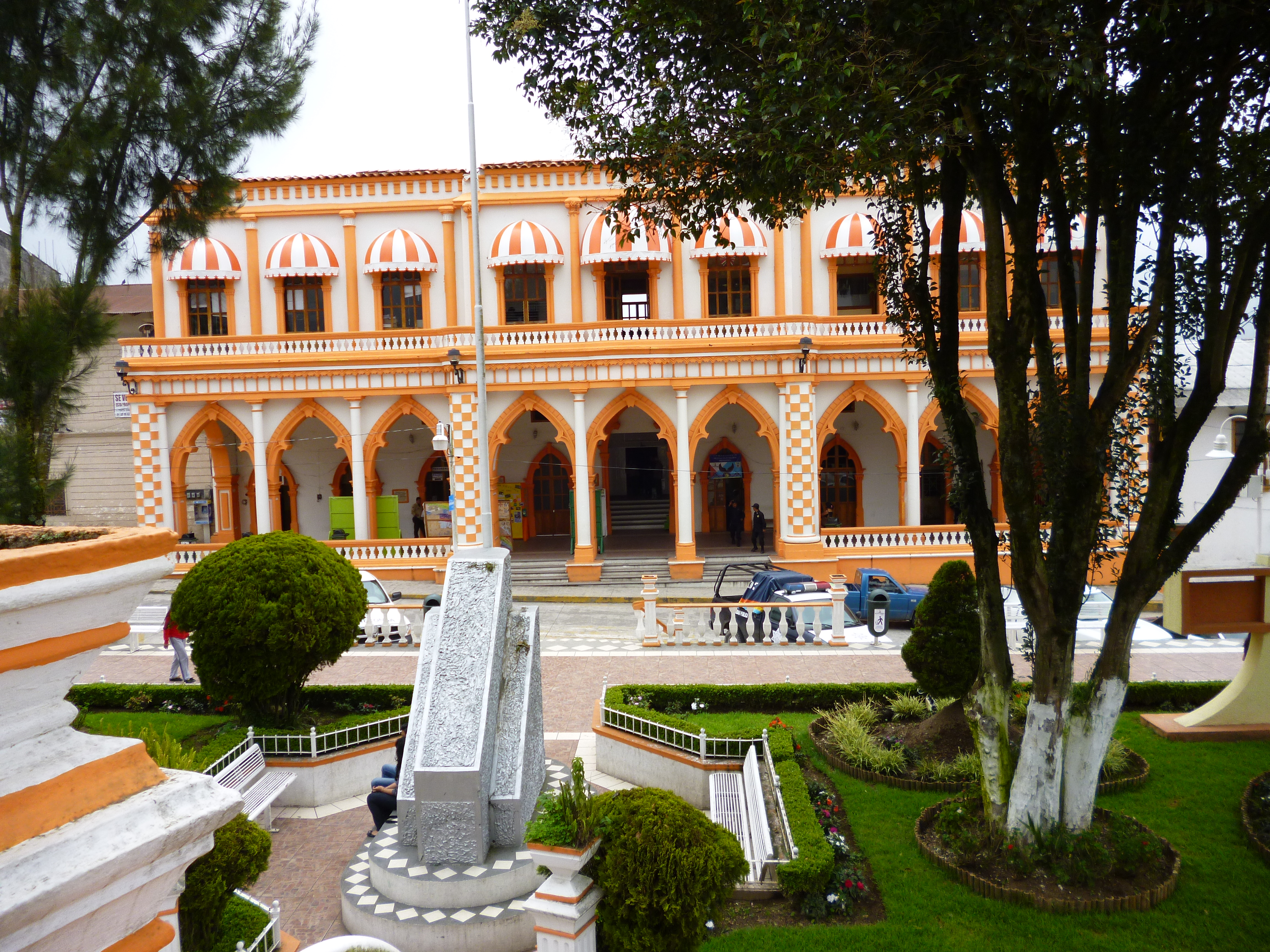
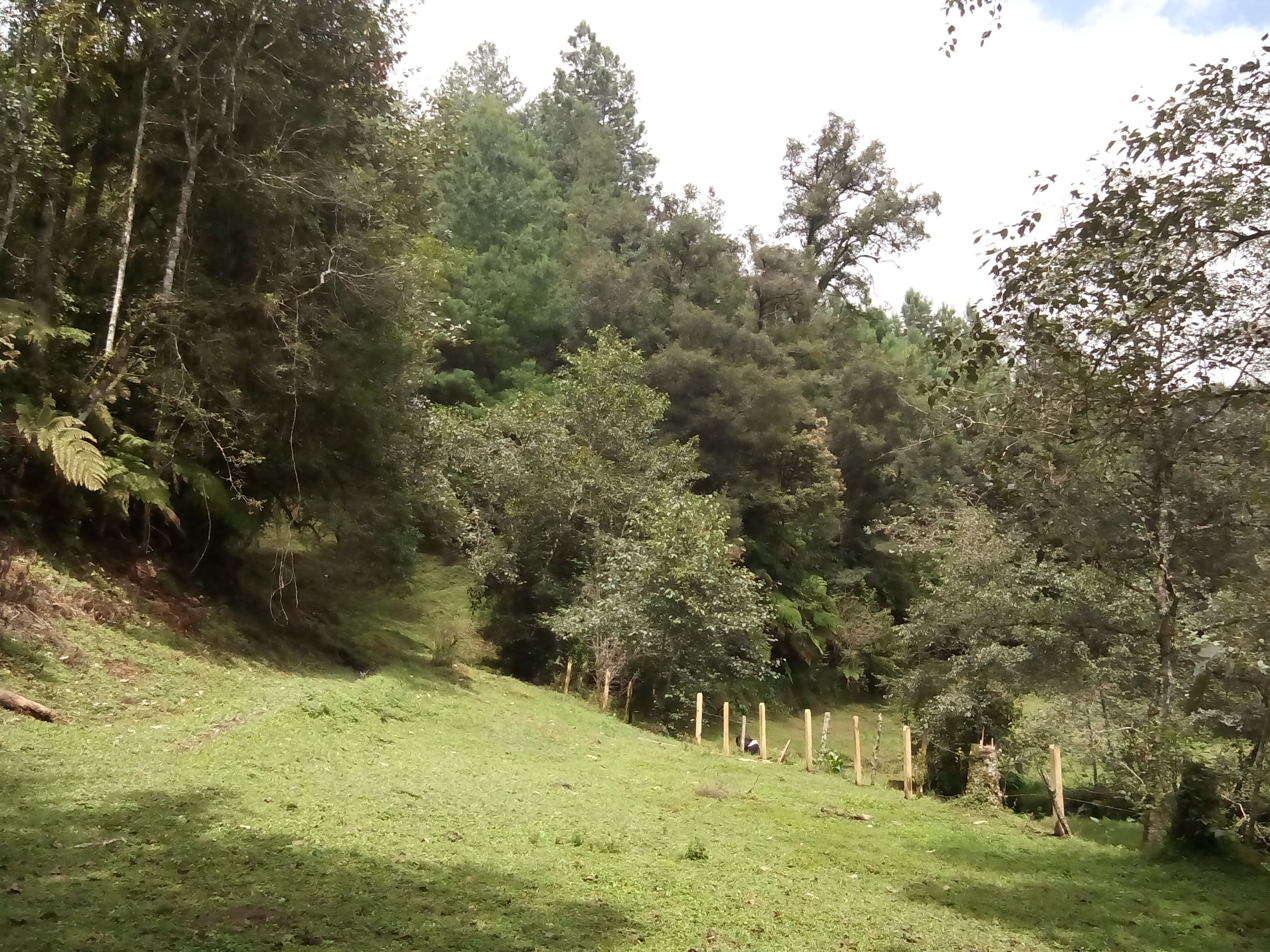
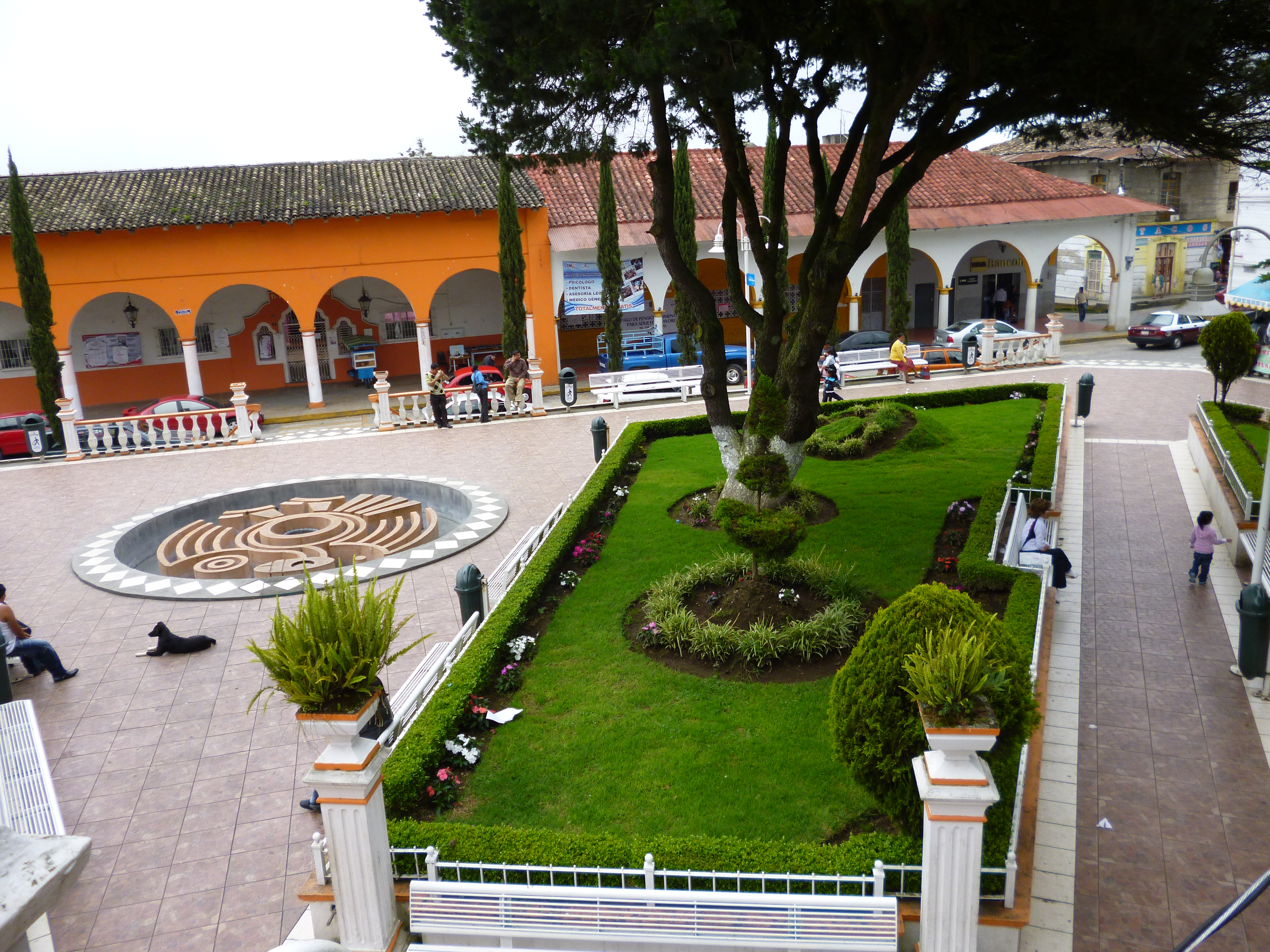
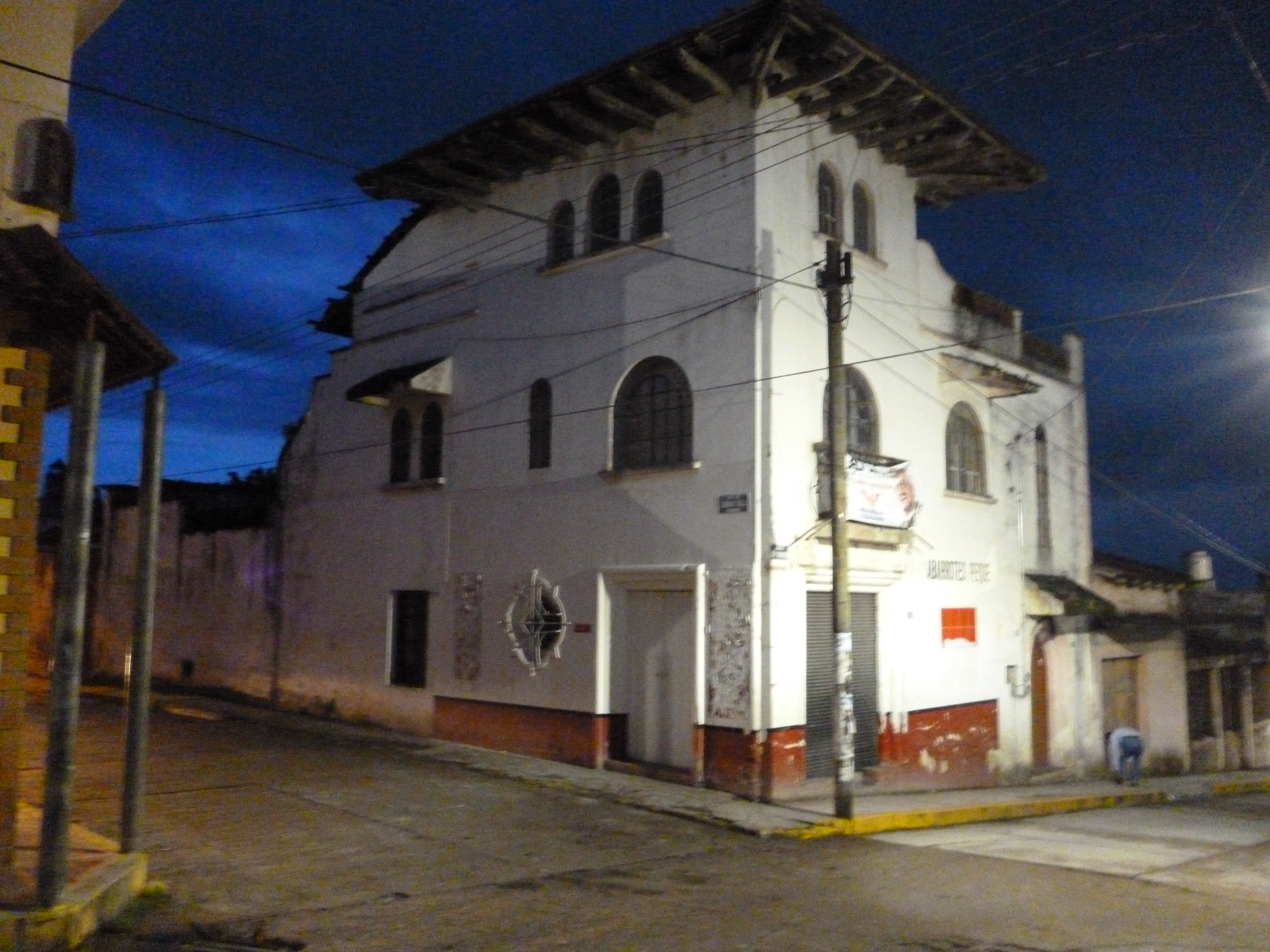
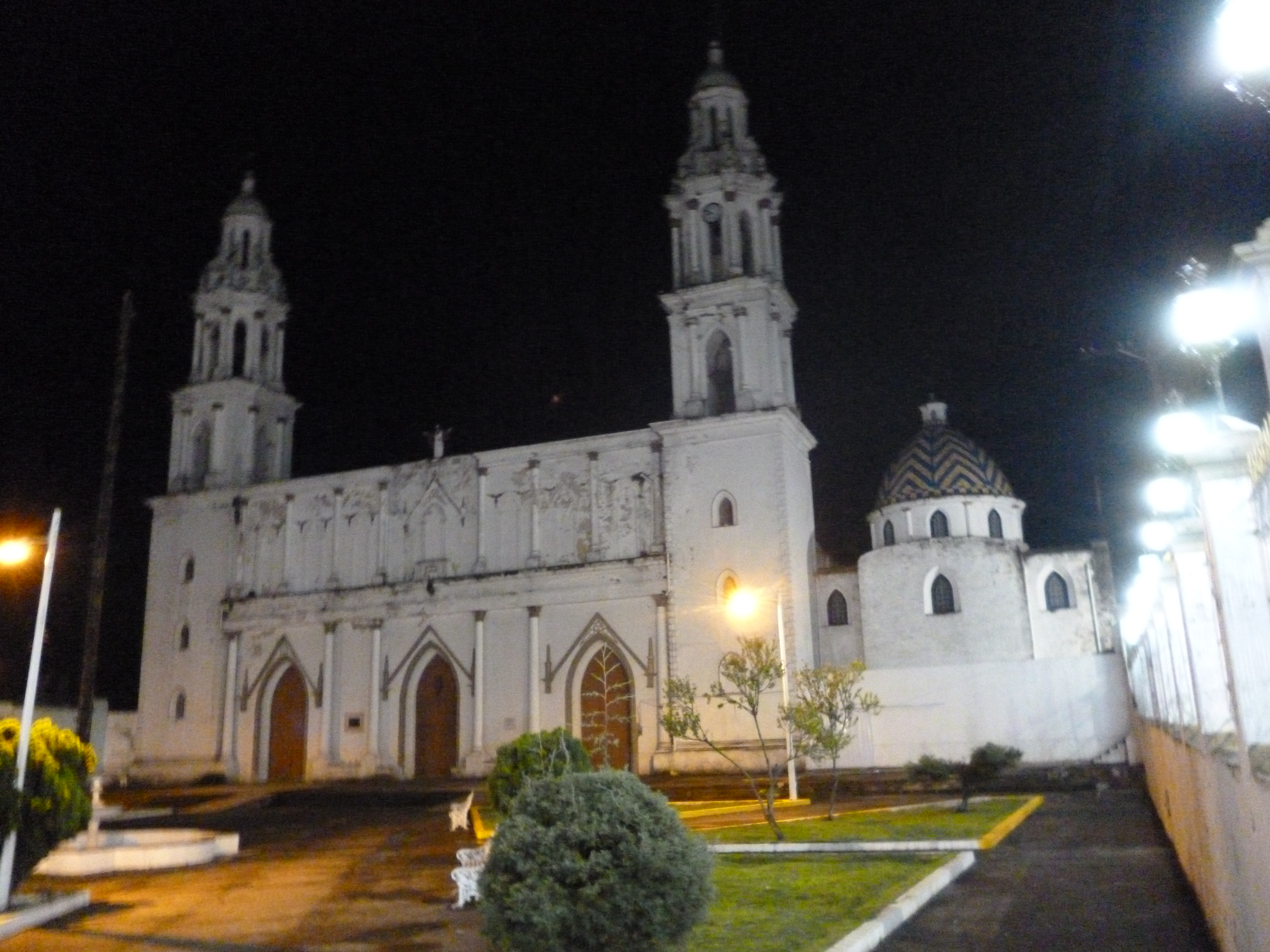
- Top: Altotonga Municipal Palace; Middle: Altotonga forest landscape, Altotonga main plaza; Bottom: Altotonga Downtown, María Magdalena Church

- Coat of arms

- Location in Mexico Altotonga (Mexico)
- Coordinates: 19°45′58″N 97°14′44″W
- Country: Mexico
- State: Veracruz
- Region: Capital Region

Government
  - Mayor: Rozaz 250 (PRI)

Area
  - Total: 328.7 km^{2} (126.9 sq mi)
- Elevation (of seat): 2,500 m (8,200 ft)

Population (2020)
  - Total: 64,234
  - Density: 189.7/km^{2} (491/sq mi)
  - Seat: 21,640
- Time zone: UTC-6 (Central (US Central))
- Postal code (of seat): 93700
- Climate: ET
- Website: (in Spanish)

Historical population
Year	Pop.	±%
1995	48,827	—
2000	53,241	+9.0%
2005	56,962	+7.0%
2010	60,396	+6.0%
2015	65,548	+8.5%
2020	64,234	−2.0%

Altotonga (Spanish: Municipio de Altotonga) is a municipality in the Mexican state of Veracruz. It is located about 80 km northwest of the state capital Xalapa. It has an area of 328.7 km^{2} It is located at 19°46′N 97°15′W.

Altotonga is delimited to the east by Misantla, to the south by Tenochtitlán, Tatatila, Las Minas, Villa Aldama and Perote, to the west by Jalacingo, and to the north by Atzalan and Misantla.

It produces maize, beans and potatoes.

== History ==
=== Pre-Columbian Era ===
Before the arrival of the Spanish, the area that is now Altotonga was inhabited by indigenous groups, primarily the Totonac people. The Totonac civilization was known for its advanced agricultural practices, architecture, and trade networks. They were part of a broader Mesoamerican cultural region that included other significant civilizations such as the Aztecs and the Maya.

=== Spanish Colonization ===
With the Spanish conquest of Mexico in the early 16th century, the region came under Spanish control. The Spanish imposed new administrative and religious structures, leading to significant changes in the local way of life. The introduction of Christianity and the encomienda system, which was a form of labor exploitation, had lasting impacts on the indigenous population and culture.

=== Post-Independence Era ===
After Mexico gained independence from Spain in 1821, Altotonga, like many other regions, underwent political and social changes. The 19th century was a period of instability and transformation in Mexico, with various internal conflicts and reforms shaping the nation. During this time, Altotonga developed as a local center for agriculture and trade.

=== Modern Era ===
In the 20th and 21st centuries, Altotonga has continued to grow and modernize while maintaining its cultural heritage. The town and its surrounding areas are known for their natural beauty, including rivers and forests, which contribute to local tourism. Agriculture remains an important part of the local economy, with crops such as coffee and corn being significant.

== Demographics ==
As of 2020 the municipality had a population of 64,234 inhabitants in 105 localities. About a third reside in the municipal seat; other localities include Juan Marcos (3,039 hab.), Ahueyahualco (2,944 hab.), Tezahuapan de Juárez (2,143 hab.) and Gutiérrez Zamora (1,828 hab.).
