= Actopan, Veracruz =

Actopan
- Municipality
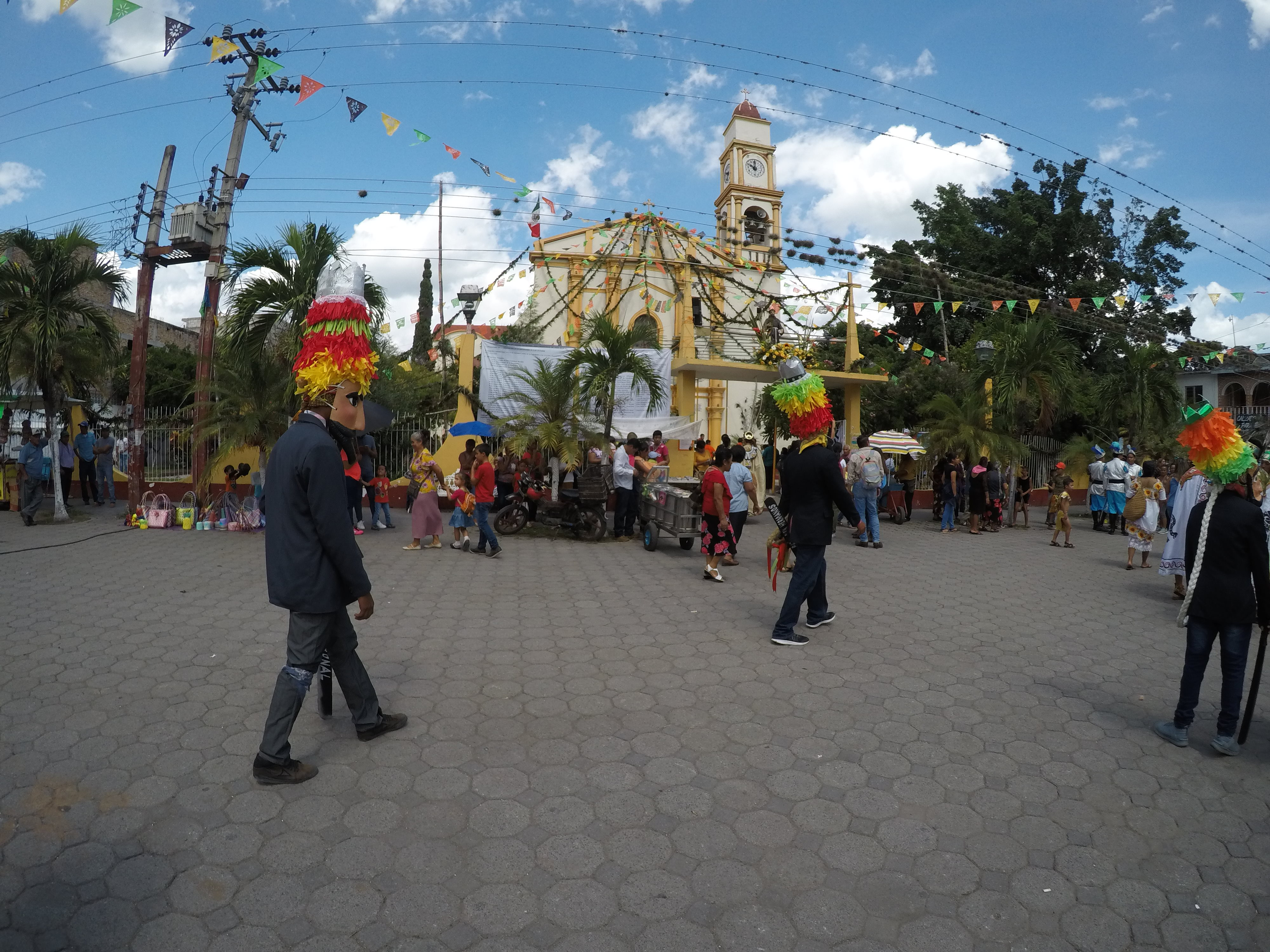
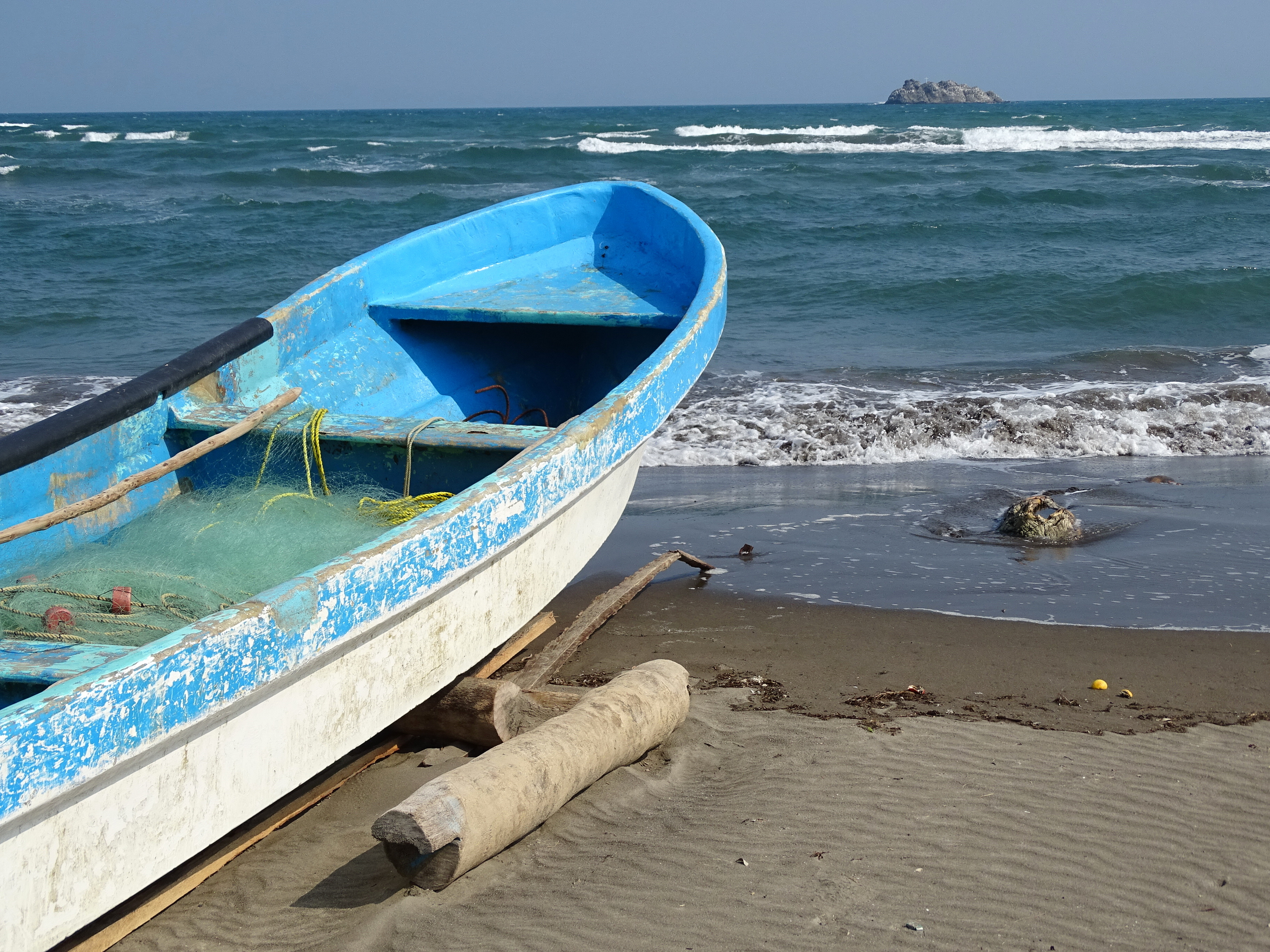
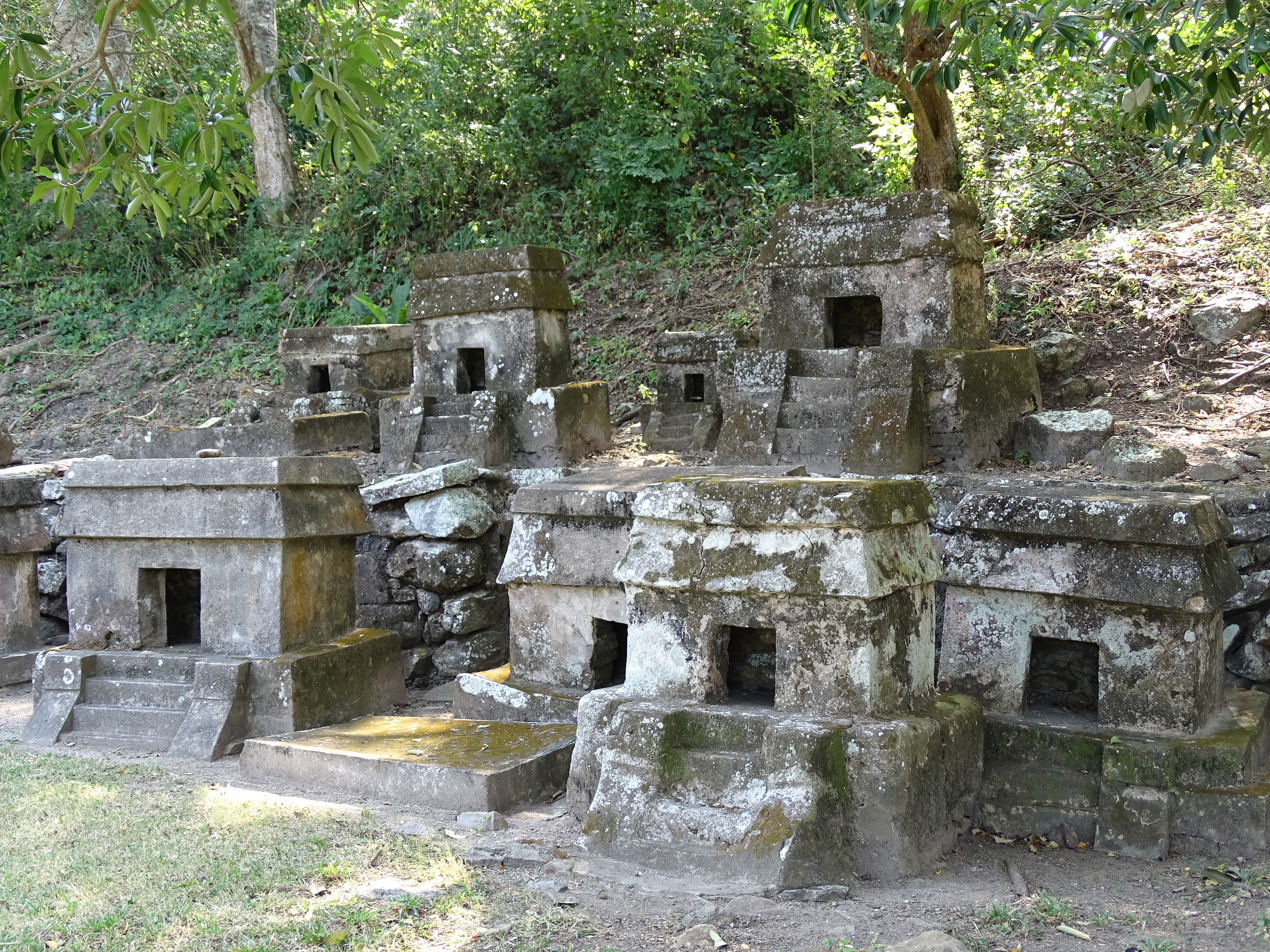
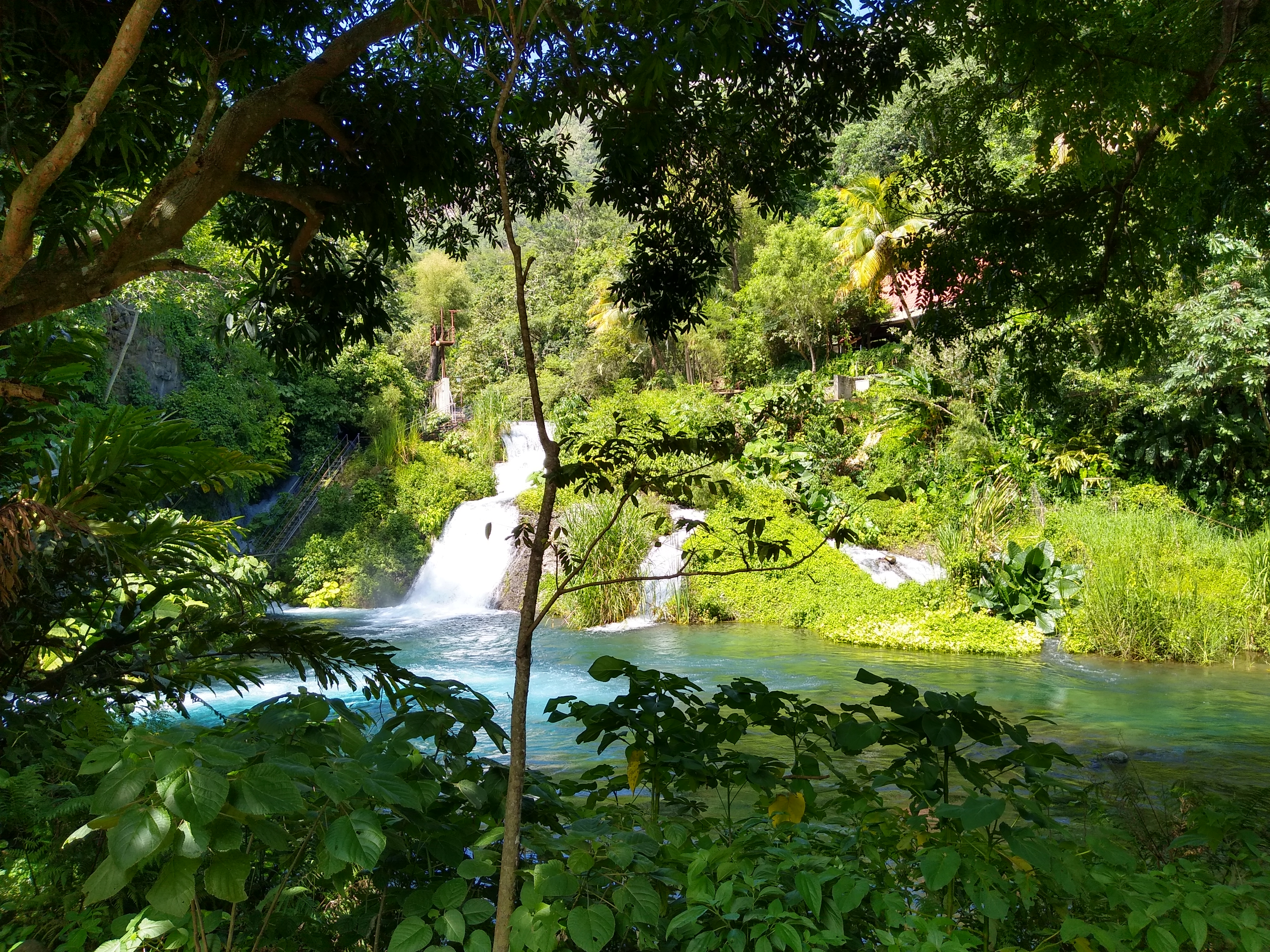
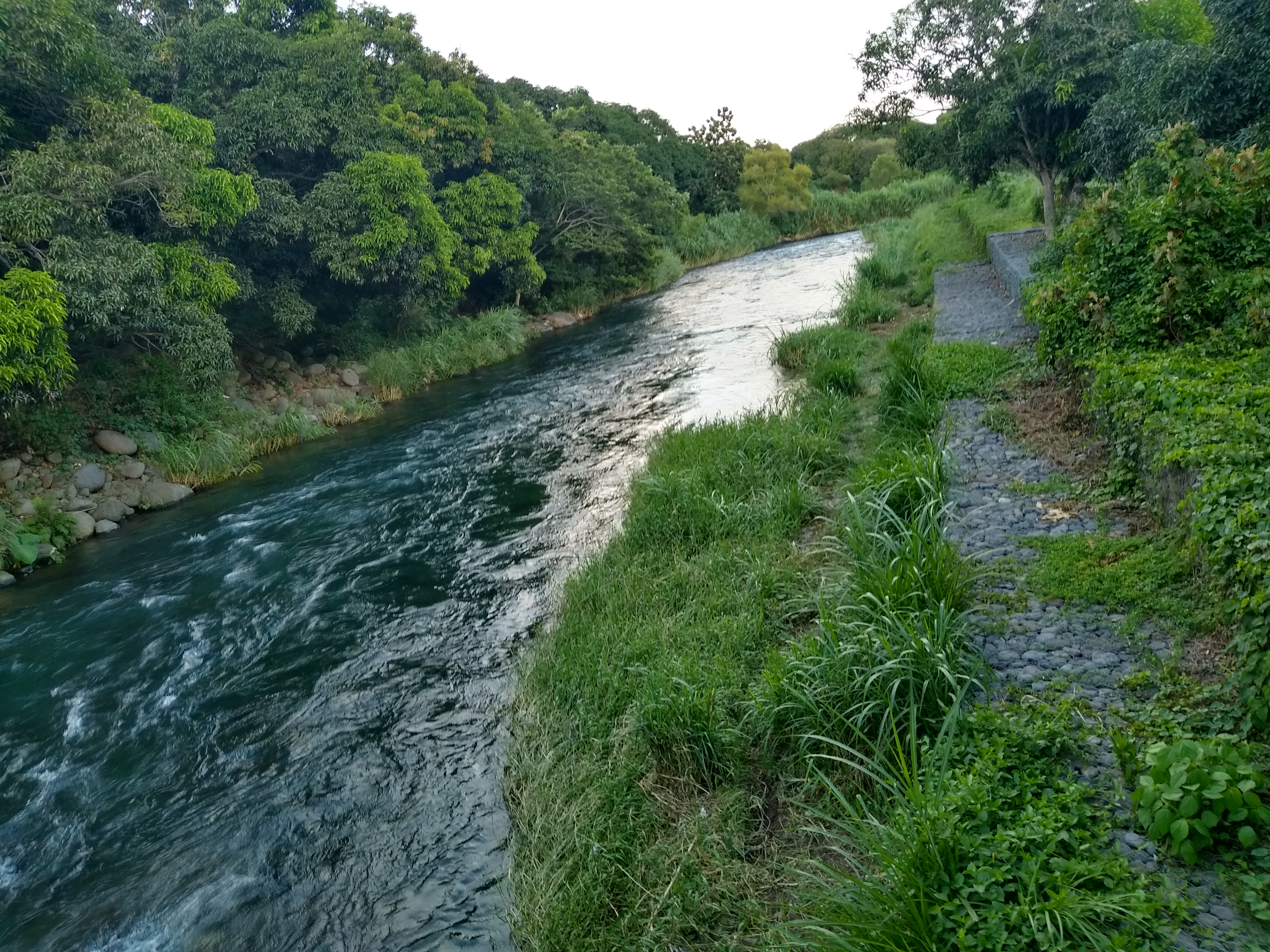
- Top: Actopan main plaza; Middle: Villa Rica beach, Quiahuiztlan archaeological zone; Bottom: Descabezadero waterfalls, Actopan river

- Coat of arms

- Location in Mexico Actopan (Mexico)
- Coordinates: 19°31′55″N 96°30′52″W
- Country: Mexico
- State: Veracruz
- Region: Capital Region

Government
  - Mayor: María Esther López Callejas (MORENA)

Area
  - Total: 859.5 km^{2} (331.9 sq mi)
- Elevation (of seat): 1,000 m (3,300 ft)

Population (2020)
  - Total: 41,762
  - Density: 48.6/km^{2} (126/sq mi)
  - Seat: 4,607
- Time zone: UTC-6 (Central (US Central))
- Postal code (of seat): 91480
- Website: (in Spanish)

Historical population
Year	Pop.	±%
1995	41,884	—
2000	39,354	−6.0%
2005	37,867	−3.8%
2010	40,994	+8.3%
2015	43,388	+5.8%
2020	41,742	−3.8%

Actopan is a municipality located at 19°30′N 96°37′W in the montane central zone in the Mexican state of Veracruz, about 50 km from the state capital of Xalapa. Actopan, the municipal seat, is a small city located near the capital of the state. The region is one of the most important producers of mangoes in the state.

== Geography ==
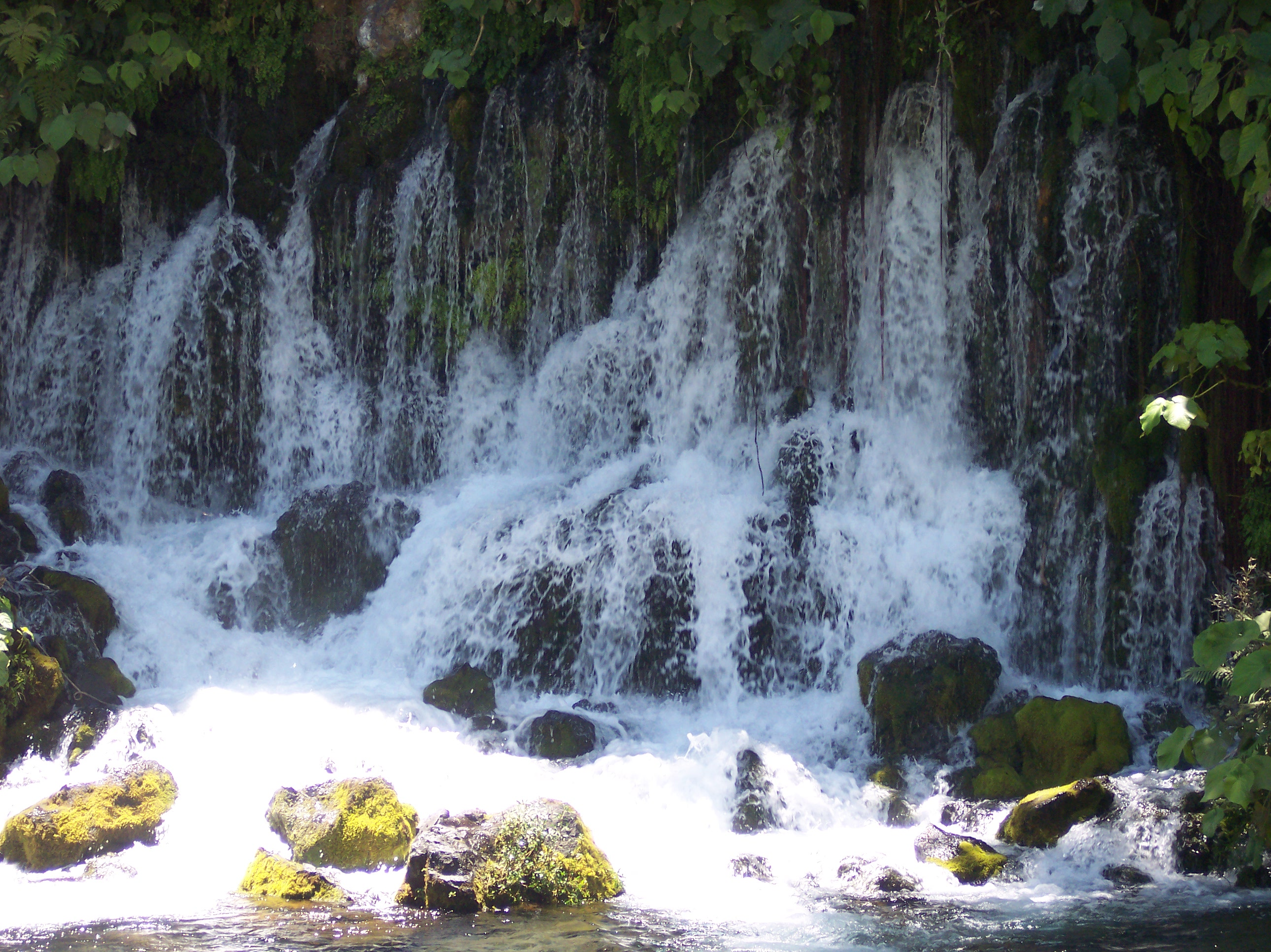
The Descabezadero, located in the municipality, is fed by the Actopan River.

=== Adjacent municipalities ===
- Alto Lucero de Gutiérrez Barrios Municipality (north)
- Úrsulo Galván Municipality (southeast)
- Puente Nacional Municipality (south)
- Emiliano Zapata Municipality (southwest)
- Naolinco Municipality (west)

=== Major highways ===
- Mexican Federal Highway 180

=== Geographic limits ===
The municipality of Actopan is delimited to the east by the Golfo de Mexico, to the south by the Emiliano Zapata, to the west by the Naolinco, and to the north by Alto Lucero. It is watered by the river Actopan, which it is born in Cofre de Perote, ends in the Gulf of Mexico, forming the Barra de Chachalacas.

=== Weather ===
The weather in Actopan is warm and wet all year with rains in summer and autumn.

== Demographics ==
As of 2020, Actopan had a population of 41,762 inhabitants in 194 localities with 10% of the population residing in the municipal seat (4,607 hab.). Other localities includes Mozomboa (3,329 hab.), Coyolillo (2,394 hab.), Tinajitas (2,038 hab.) and Santa Rosa (1,975 hab.).

== Agriculture ==
It produces principally maize, beans chayote squash and the most important the mango production.

== Celebrations ==
In Actopan, the celebration in honor to San Francisco de Asís, Patron of the town, takes place in October, and the celebration in honor to Virgen de Guadalupe takes place in December, also a Mexican celebration called El dia de los muertos which means Day Of the dead.
