= Teocelo =

- Municipality
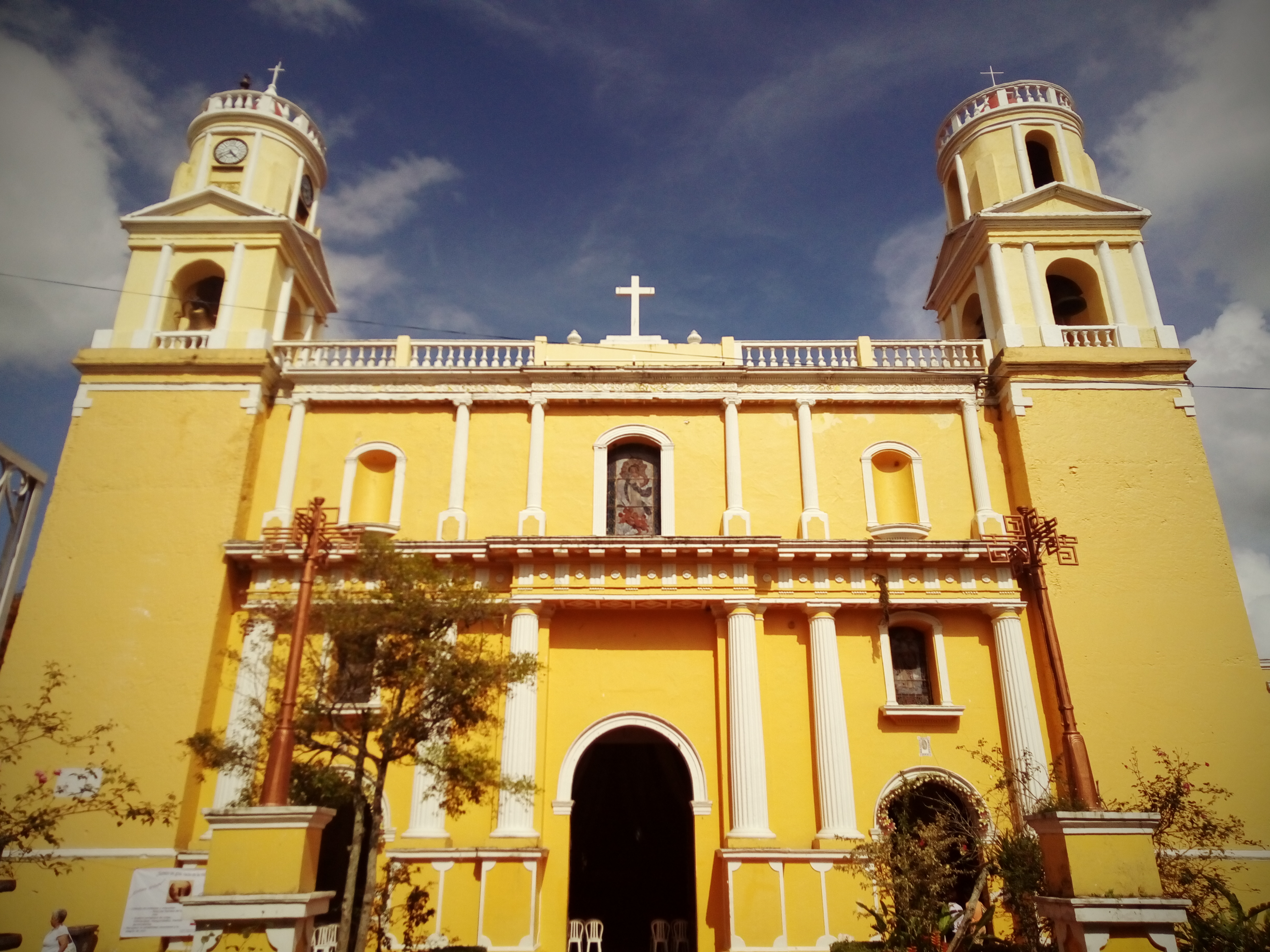
- Parish of the Assumption of Saint Mary

- Coat of arms

- Location in Mexico Teocelo (Mexico)
- Coordinates: 19°23′00″N 96°58′00″W
- Country: Mexico
- State: Veracruz
- Region: Capital Region
- Municipal seat and largest town: Teocelo

Government
  - Municipal President: Isaac Alberto Anell Reyes (PT)

Area
  - Total: 60.8 km^{2} (23.5 sq mi)
- Elevation (of seat): 1,181 m (3,875 ft)

Population (2020)
  - Total: 16,957
  - Density: 278.9/km^{2} (722/sq mi)
  - Seat: 10,581
- Time zone: UTC-6 (Central)
- Postal codes: 91615
- Area code: 228
- Website: website

Teocelo is a city and municipality in the Mexican state of Veracruz, located 20 km from Jalapa-Enríquez on Federal Highway 180. It is bordered by: Ixhuacán, Xico, and Coatepec. The coffee of Teocelo is among the best coffees produced in Mexico.

Surrounded by scenic mountainous terrain, the area has been featured in a number of popular American films. Scenes from "Romancing The Stone" and "Clear and Present Danger" were filmed nearby at the well-known Cascada de Texolo.

== Demographics ==
Historical population
Year	Pop.	±%
1995	14,050	—
2000	14,900	+6.0%
2005	15,130	+1.5%
2010	16,327	+7.9%
2015	16,480	+0.9%
2020	16,957	+2.9%

In 2020, Teocelo recorded population of 16,957 inhabitantes in 26 localities. Teocelo, the municipal seat, it's the only one classified as urban, with a population of 10,581 hab. Other localities include Monte Blanco (1,675 hab.), Llano Grande (1,341 hab.), Texín (1,107 hab.) and Baxtla (726 hab.).
