= Tembladeras, Veracruz =

Tembladeras
- Location in Veracruz and Mexico Tembladeras (Mexico)
- Coordinates: 19°30′44″N 97°07′05″W
- Country: Mexico
- State: Veracruz
- Municipality: Xico
- Elevation: 10,177 ft (3,102 m)

Population (2020)
  - Total: 531
- Time zone: UTC-6 (CST)

Tembladeras is a village in Xico municipality in the Mexican state of Veracruz. It has a population of 531.

== Climate ==
Tembladeras has a cold subtropical highland climate (Cfb) with cold winters and cool, rainy summers.

Climate data for Tembladeras
Month	Jan	Feb	Mar	Apr	May	Jun	Jul	Aug	Sep	Oct	Nov	Dec	Year
Mean daily maximum °C (°F)	12.6 (54.7)	13.6 (56.5)	15.6 (60.1)	17.0 (62.6)	17.2 (63.0)	15.5 (59.9)	14.0 (57.2)	14.2 (57.6)	14.2 (57.6)	14.0 (57.2)	13.6 (56.5)	12.9 (55.2)	14.5 (58.2)
Daily mean °C (°F)	7.6 (45.7)	8.3 (46.9)	9.9 (49.8)	11.2 (52.2)	11.5 (52.7)	10.6 (51.1)	9.7 (49.5)	9.8 (49.6)	9.9 (49.8)	9.3 (48.7)	8.5 (47.3)	7.9 (46.2)	9.5 (49.1)
Mean daily minimum °C (°F)	2.6 (36.7)	3.1 (37.6)	4.2 (39.6)	5.4 (41.7)	5.7 (42.3)	5.7 (42.3)	5.4 (41.7)	5.4 (41.7)	5.6 (42.1)	4.7 (40.5)	3.5 (38.3)	2.9 (37.2)	4.5 (40.1)
Average rainfall mm (inches)	41.7 (1.64)	40.0 (1.57)	33.3 (1.31)	53.1 (2.09)	84.9 (3.34)	273.9 (10.78)	346.5 (13.64)	305.2 (12.02)	305.7 (12.04)	128.5 (5.06)	56.1 (2.21)	39.1 (1.54)	1,708 (67.24)
Average rainy days	6.1	6.0	5.8	7.8	10.3	19.3	22.9	22.5	21.2	13.9	8.0	6.4	150.2
Source: SERVICIO METEOROLÓGICO NACIONAL
