= Ernesto Alarcón Trujillo =

Mexican politician

- Born: 11 March 1956 (age 70); Atzalán, Veracruz, Mexico
- Education: Universidad Veracruzana
- Occupation: Politician
- Political party: PRI

Ernesto Alarcón Trujillo (born 11 March 1956) is a Mexican politician affiliated with the Institutional Revolutionary Party (PRI). In the 2003 mid-terms he was elected to the Chamber of Deputies to represent the ninth district of Veracruz during the 59th Congress. He was previously the municipal president of Atzalán from 1995 to 1997.
