= Alba Leonila Méndez =

Mexican politician

- Born: 15 May 1968 (age 58); Atzalán, Veracruz, Mexico
- Occupation: Politician
- Political party: PAN

Alba Leonila Méndez Herrera (born 15 May 1968) is a Mexican politician from the National Action Party (PAN). In the 2009 mid-terms she was elected to the Chamber of Deputies to represent the seventh district of Veracruz during the 61st Congress.
