= Verónica Carreón Cervantes =

Mexican politician

- Born: 3 July 1970 (age 55); Veracruz, Mexico
- Occupation: Deputy
- Political party: PRI

Verónica Carreón Cervantes (born 3 July 1970) is a Mexican politician affiliated with the Institutional Revolutionary Party (PRI).

In the 2012 general election she was elected to the Chamber of Deputies to represent the seventh district of Veracruz on a Green Ecologist Party of Mexico (PVEM) ticket. However, she switched allegiance from the PVEM to the PRI on 4 September 2012.
