= Fernando Charleston =

Mexican politician

Personal details
- Born: 13 October 1976 (age 49) Coatepec, Veracruz, Mexico
- Party: PRI
- Occupation: Congressman

Fernando Charleston Hernández (born 13 October 1976) is a Mexican politician affiliated with the Institutional Revolutionary Party (PRI). In the 2012 general election he was elected to the Chamber of Deputies to represent the ninth district of Veracruz during the 62nd Congress from 29 August 2012 to 28 August 2013.
