= José de la Torre Sánchez =

Mexican politician

- Born: 21 July 1956 (age 69); Veracruz, Mexico
- Occupation: Politician
- Political party: PAN

José de la Torre Sánchez (born 21 July 1956) is a Mexican politician from the National Action Party (PAN). In the 2006 general election he was elected to the Chamber of Deputies to represent the seventh district of Veracruz during the 60th Congress.
