= José Yunes Zorrilla =

Mexican politician (born 1969)

José Francisco Yunes Zorrilla
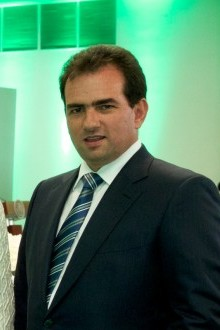
- Born: 25 September 1969 (age 56); Perote, Veracruz, Mexico
- Occupation: Politician
- Political party: PRI

José Francisco Yunes Zorrilla (born 25 September 1969) is a Mexican politician affiliated with the Institutional Revolutionary Party (PRI). In the 2018 general election he was elected to serve as a Senator for Veracruz in the 62nd and 63rd Congresses (2018–2024). He also served in the Chamber of Deputies for Veracruz's 9th congressional district on three occasions — 2000–2003, 2009–2012, and 2021–2024 — and, in 1998 to 2000, was the mayor of his hometown of Perote, Veracruz.

Yunes Zorrilla contended for the governorship of Veracruz in the 2 June 2024 election, on the Fuerza y Corazón por México coalition ticket, but lost to Rocío Nahle García of Morena. He previously ran for the same position in 2018, but lost to Cuitláhuac García of Morena.
