= Guillermo Zorrilla Fernández =

Mexican politician

- Born: 9 May 1963 (age 63); Tecolutla, Veracruz, Mexico
- Occupation: Politician
- Political party: PRI

Guillermo Zorrilla Fernández (born 9 May 1963) is a Mexican politician affiliated with the Institutional Revolutionary Party (PRI). In the 2003 mid-terms he was elected to the Chamber of Deputies to represent the seventh district of Veracruz during the 59th Congress.
