= Capital Region, Veracruz =

Capital Region
- Region
- Capital Region corresponds to #5
- Country: Mexico
- State: Veracruz
- Largest city: Xalapa

Population (2020)
  - Total: 1,254,238
- Time zone: UTC−6 (CST)

Capital Region is one of the regions of Veracruz, Mexico.

== Geography ==
The Capital Region is in the central part of the state. It extends from the seacoast on the east to the mountains of the Trans-Mexican Volcanic Belt on the west. It is bounded on the north by Nautla Region, on the east by the Gulf of Mexico, on the south by Sotavento and Mountains regions, and on the west by the state of Puebla.

== Municipalities ==
| Municipality code | Name | Population | | Land Area | | | Population density | |
| Municipality code | Name | 2020 | Rank | km^{2} | sq mi | Rank | 2020 | Rank |
|---|---|---|---|---|---|---|---|---|
| 001 | Acajete | 9,701 | 23 | 97.5 | 37.6 | 31 | 99/km^{2} (258/sq mi) | 23 |
| 002 | Acatlán | 3,441 | 31 | 18.3 | 7.1 | 31 | 188/km^{2} (487/sq mi) | 17 |
| 004 | Actopan | 41,742 | 7 | 860.1 | 332.1 | 1 | 49/km^{2} (126/sq mi) | 31 |
| 009 | Alto Lucero | 28,184 | 9 | 648.3 | 250.3 | 2 | 43/km^{2} (113/sq mi) | 32 |
| 010 | Altotonga | 64,234 | 5 | 328.5 | 126.8 | 5 | 196/km^{2} (506/sq mi) | 16 |
| 017 | Apazapan | 4,709 | 30 | 67.7 | 26.1 | 21 | 70/km^{2} (180/sq mi) | 29 |
| 025 | Ayahualulco | 27,217 | 10 | 173 | 67 | 9 | 157/km^{2} (407/sq mi) | 19 |
| 026 | Banderilla | 25,993 | 11 | 19.8 | 7.6 | 30 | 1,313/km^{2} (1,313/km^{2}) | 3 |
| 057 | Chiconquiaco | 13,881 | 18 | 133.7 | 51.6 | 11 | 104/km^{2} (269/sq mi) | 22 |
| 036 | Coacoatzintla | 11,018 | 22 | 43.9 | 16.9 | 27 | 251/km^{2} (650/sq mi) | 9 |
| 038 | Coatepec | 93,911 | 2 | 202.3 | 78.1 | 7 | 464/km^{2} (1,202/sq mi) | 5 |
| 046 | Cosautlán de Carvajal | 16,167 | 17 | 76.6 | 29.6 | 19 | 211/km^{2} (547/sq mi) | 13 |
| 065 | Emiliano Zapata | 85,489 | 3 | 415.8 | 160.5 | 4 | 206/km^{2} (533/sq mi) | 15 |
| 079 | Ixhuacán de los Reyes | 11,387 | 21 | 149.8 | 57.8 | 10 | 76/km^{2} (197/sq mi) | 27 |
| 086 | Jalacingo | 46,794 | 6 | 208.1 | 80.3 | 6 | 225/km^{2} (582/sq mi) | 11 |
| 088 | Jalcomulco | 5,054 | 28 | 72.7 | 28.1 | 20 | 70/km^{2} (180/sq mi) | 28 |
| 093 | Jilotepec | 16,585 | 16 | 56.3 | 21.7 | 23 | 295/km^{2} (763/sq mi) | 7 |
| 096 | Landero y Coss | 1,543 | 33 | 17.6 | 6.8 | 32 | 88/km^{2} (227/sq mi) | 25 |
| 107 | Las Minas | 2,934 | 32 | 99.8 | 38.5 | 15 | 29/km^{2} (76/sq mi) | 33 |
| 132 | Las Vigas de Ramírez | 20,300 | 13 | 50.8 | 19.6 | 25 | 400/km^{2} (1,035/sq mi) | 6 |
| 106 | Miahuatlán | 4,841 | 29 | 29.5 | 11.4 | 29 | 164/km^{2} (425/sq mi) | 18 |
| 112 | Naolinco | 22,835 | 12 | 108.4 | 41.9 | 14 | 211/km^{2} (546/sq mi) | 14 |
| 128 | Perote | 77,432 | 4 | 609.1 | 235.2 | 3 | 127/km^{2} (329/sq mi) | 20 |
| 136 | Rafael Lucio | 8,343 | 25 | 11.5 | 4.4 | 33 | 6,733/km^{2} (17,439/sq mi) | 1 |
| 156 | Tatatila | 6,041 | 27 | 91.9 | 35.5 | 18 | 66/km^{2} (170/sq mi) | 30 |
| 164 | Teocelo | 16,957 | 15 | 60.8 | 23.5 | 22 | 279/km^{2} (722/sq mi) | 8 |
| 166 | Tepetlán | 9,405 | 24 | 95.5 | 36.9 | 17 | 98/km^{2} (255/sq mi) | 24 |
| 177 | Tlacolulan | 11,685 | 20 | 133.5 | 51.5 | 12 | 88/km^{2} (227/sq mi) | 26 |
| 182 | Tlalnelhuayocan | 19,664 | 14 | 36.7 | 14.2 | 28 | 536/km^{2} (1,388/sq mi) | 4 |
| 187 | Tonayán | 6,105 | 26 | 50.2 | 19.4 | 26 | 122/km^{2} (315/sq mi) | 21 |
| 194 | Villa Aldama | 12,492 | 19 | 51.5 | 19.9 | 24 | 243/km^{2} (628/sq mi) | 10 |
| 087 | Xalapa | 488,531 | 1 | 124.6 | 48.1 | 13 | 3,921/km^{2} (10,155/sq mi) | 2 |
| 092 | Xico | 39,623 | 8 | 179 | 69 | 8 | 221/km^{2} (573/sq mi) | 12 |
| | Capital Region | 1,254,238 | — | 3,166 | 2,055.22 | — | 236/km^{2} (610/sq mi) | — |
Source: INEGI

=== Largest cities ===
Largest cities or towns in Capital Region Source:
| Rank | | Municipality | Pop. |
|---|---|---|---|
| 1 | Xalapa-Enríquez | Xalapa | 443,063 |
| 2 | Coatepec | Coatepec | 55,720 |
| 3 | Perote | Perote | 42,451 |
| 4 | Banderilla | Banderilla | 22,760 |
| 5 | Altotonga | Altotonga | 21,640 |
| 6 | Xico | Xico | 21,585 |
| 7 | Jalacingo | Jalacingo | 15,807 |
| 8 | Colonia Santa Bárbara | Xalapa | 13,738 |
| 9 | Jacarandas | Emiliano Zapata | 11,864 |
| 10 | Teocelo | Teocelo | 10,581 |
