= Cascada de Texolo =

Waterfall located in Veracruz, Mexico

Coordinates: 19°24′06″N 96°59′40″W

Designations

Ramsar Wetland
- Official name: Cascadas de Texolo y su entorno
- Designated: 2 February 2006
- Reference no.: 1601

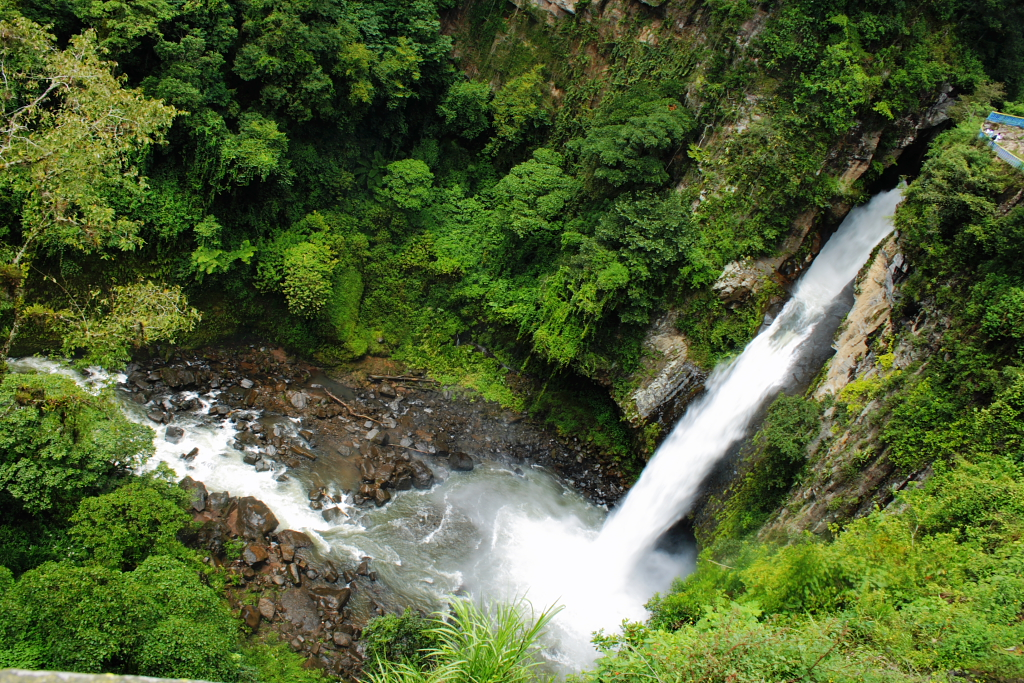

Cascada de Texolo is a waterfall of eastern Mexico. It is located 3 kilometres (1.9 miles) south of the town of Xico, in the state of Veracruz, and approximately 19 kilometres (12 miles) from Xalapa city.

The waterfall is roughly 60–80 feet (18–24 m) high. There is a bridge over the gorge connecting the dense woodland together. On the other side there are two smaller waterfalls that can be seen from some of the footpaths in the area.

== Film appearances ==
The falls and the surrounding area have been used in several movies, including Romancing The Stone and Clear and Present Danger (film). In Romancing The Stone, the jewel is hidden in a cave behind a waterfall and Texolo Waterfall was used for that scene.

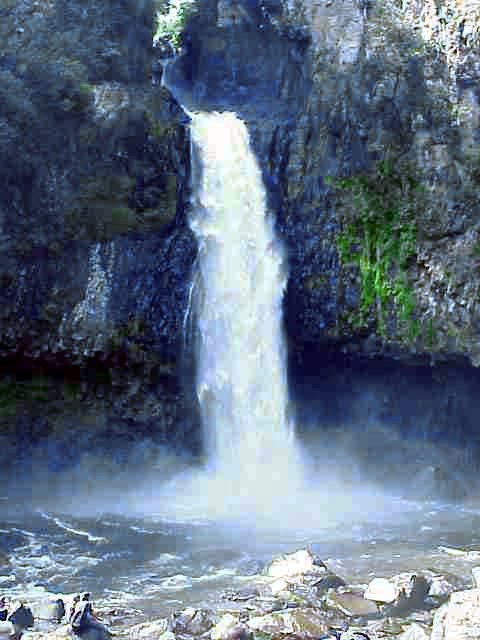
The main waterfall at Cascada de Texolo

== See also ==
- List of waterfalls
