= Naolinco =

City in Veracruz, Mexico

- Municipality
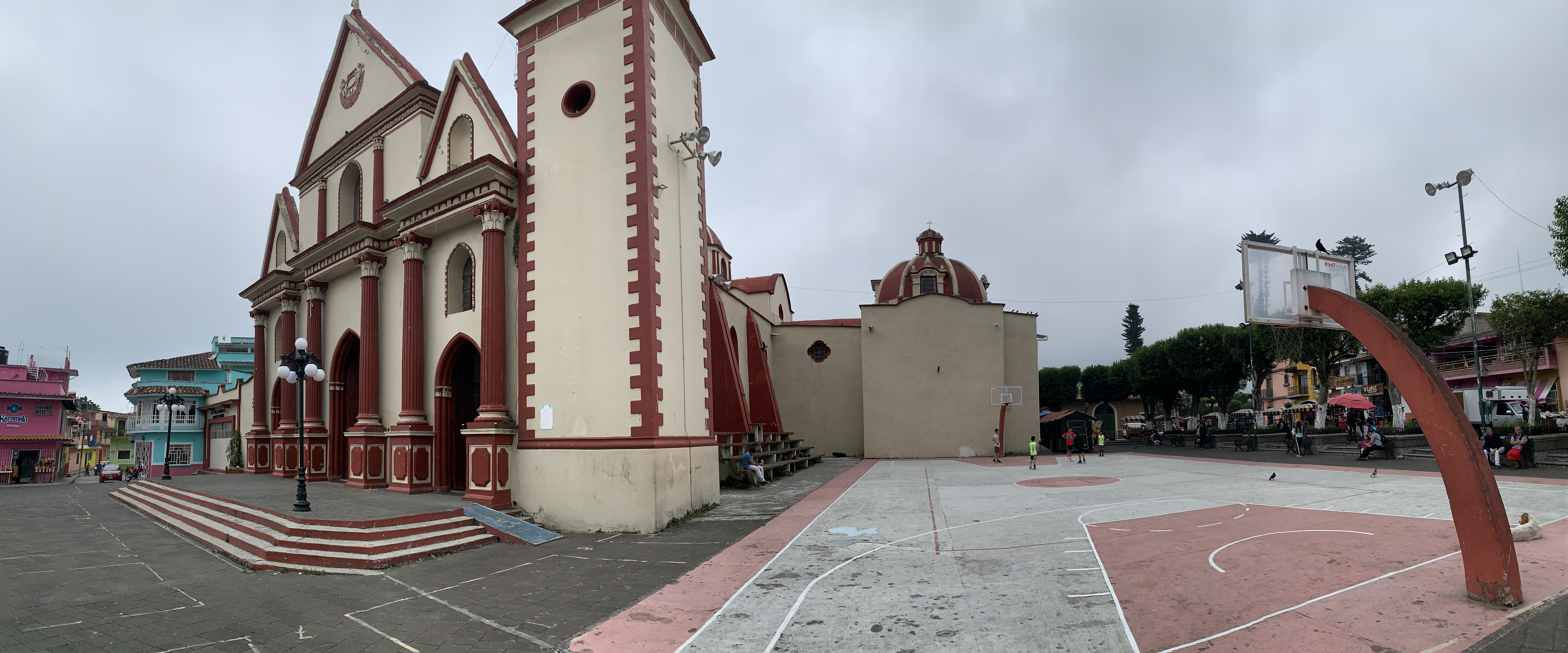
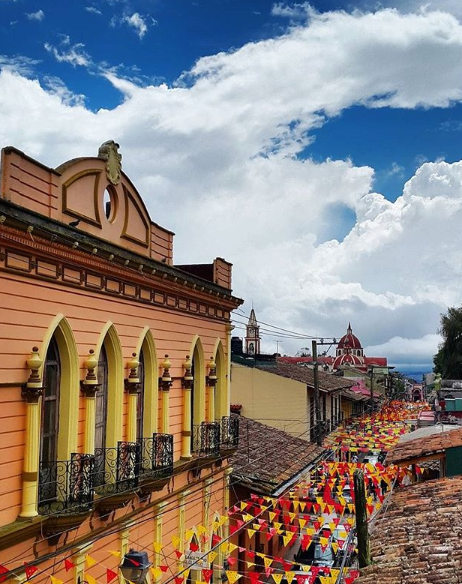
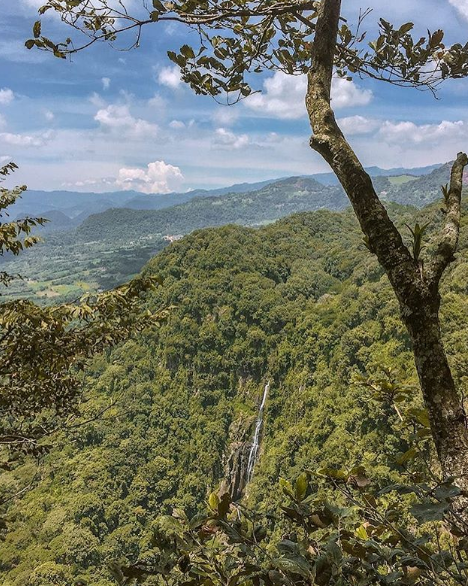
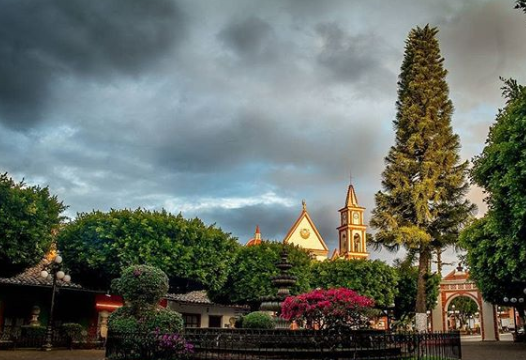
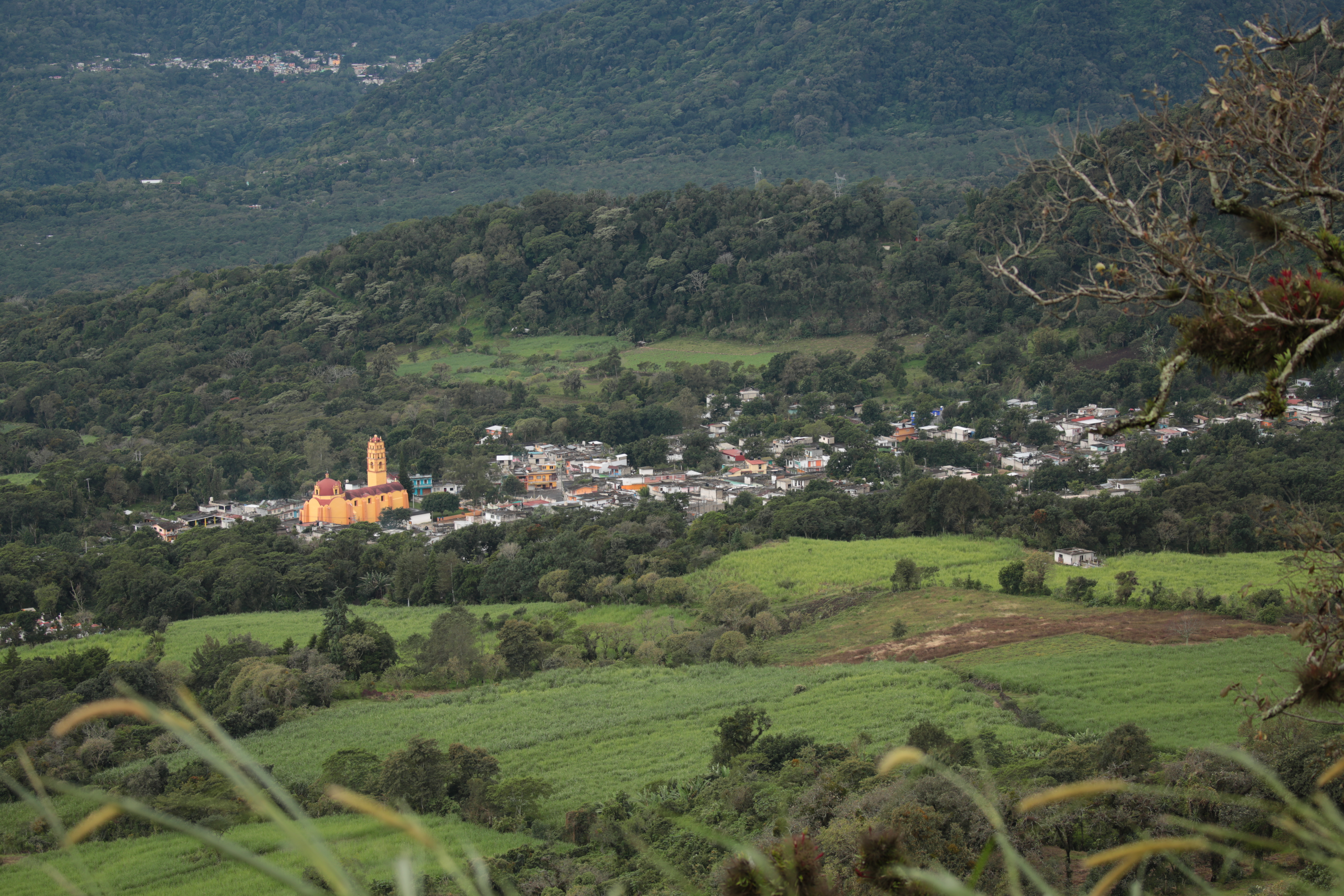
- Top: Naolinco main plaza and San Mateo Parish; Middle: Naolinco Downtown, Naolinco waterfalls; Bottom: Naolinco main park, San Pablo Coapan town

- Coat of arms

- Location in Mexico Naolinco (Mexico)
- Coordinates: 19°38′11.98″N 96°51′9.14″W
- Country: Mexico
- State: Veracruz
- Region: Capital Region
- Municipal seat and largest town: Naolinco

Government
  - Municipal President: Luis Manuel Montero Hernández (MORENA)

Area
  - Total: 108.8 km^{2} (42.0 sq mi)
- Elevation (of seat): 1,318 m (4,324 ft)

Population (2020)
  - Total: 22,835
  - Density: 209.8/km^{2} (543/sq mi)
  - Seat: 9,554
- Time zone: UTC-6 (Central (US Central))
- Postal code (of seat): 91330-91336
- Website: http://www.naolinco.gob.mx/

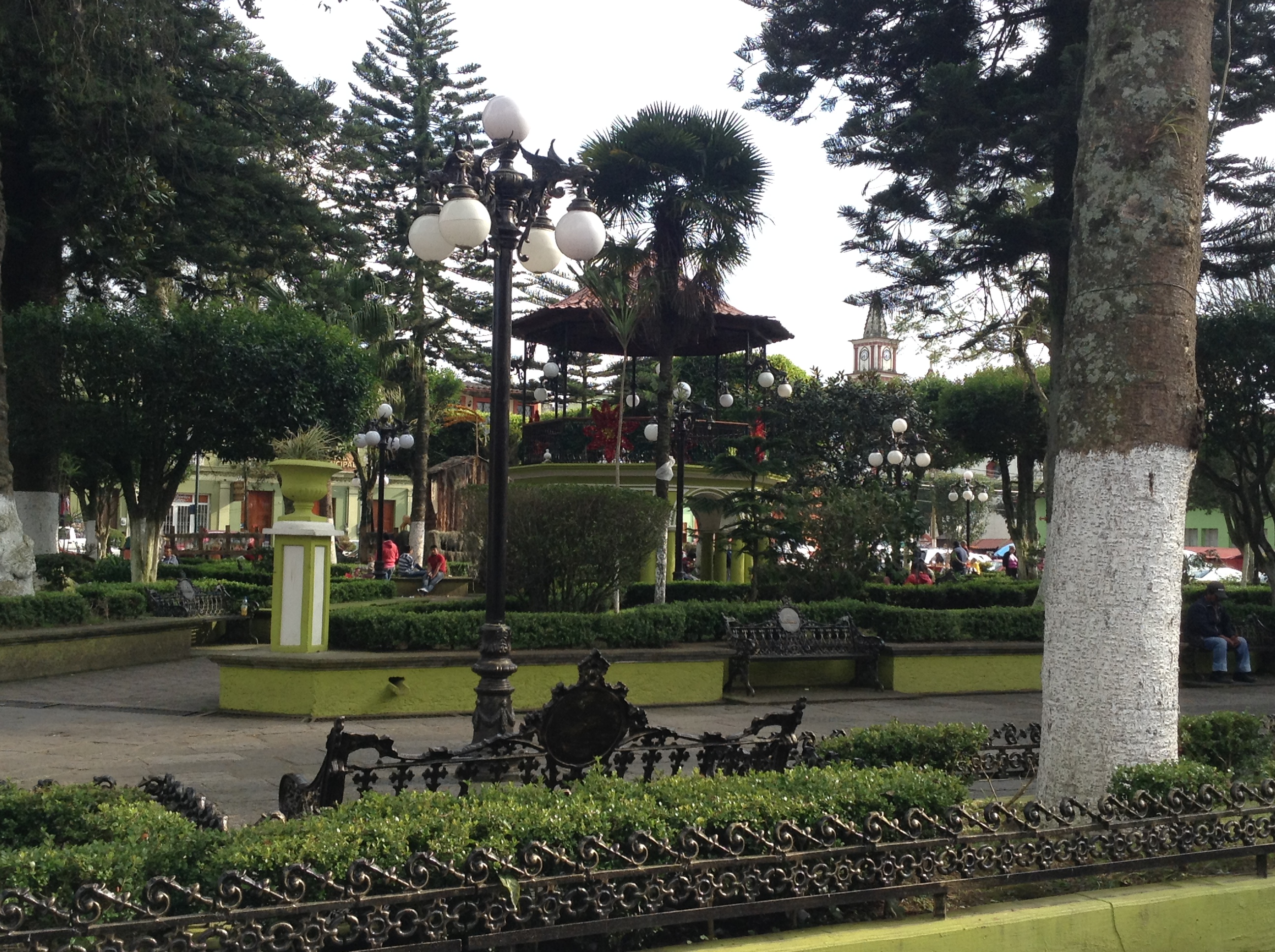
Naolinco park

Naolinco is a small city in the Mexican state of Veracruz. It is named after Guadalupe Victoria, also known as Naolinco de Victoria. It is on Federal Highways 190 and 180. It has borders with Xalapa, Acatlán, Tepetlán, and Coacoatzintla.

Naolinco is known for its leather-crafts.

In 2023, Naolinco de Victoria was designated a Pueblo Mágico by the Mexican government, recognizing its cultural and historical importance.

The 10 Waterfalls and 5 Dams of the Naolinco River: Natural Heritage and Community Memory.

Naolinco is known not only for its famous main waterfall. Along the river, there are 9 additional waterfalls, each with traditional names that form part of the community’s history and collective memory:

Waterfalls

- El Salto
- La Cueva
- El Pato
- La Olla
- De la Capilla
- La Niña
- Los 5 Chorros
- La Argolla
- Del Puente Colgante
- The main Naolinco waterfall, also known as Velo de Novia (Bridal Veil), the principal 80-meter-high drop visible from the viewpoint.

Dams and sites associated with the river

- La Toma
- Arroyo de la Mina
- Los Castro
- La Tarjea
- L. de Guevara

Recently, some influencers, content creators, and unofficial tourism guides have promoted unofficial names in an attempt to create a sense of novelty, mystery, and mysticism, inventing names such as Nágul Waterfalls, Niagul, Nahual Waterfalls, or the Mystic River Waterfall Route, among others. However, the names presented in the list above are the official/traditional names, preserved through the local oral tradition of Naolinco’s residents and supported by research and interviews.

These places are part of Naolinco’s natural heritage. Now that the river has been restored after years of pollution, there is also an effort to preserve and keep alive the memory of its traditional names and emblematic sites.

== Demographics ==
Historical population
Year	Pop.	±%
1995	16,976	—
2000	18,097	+6.6%
2005	18,885	+4.4%
2010	20,255	+7.3%
2015	21,816	+7.7%
2020	22,835	+4.7%

In 2020, Naolinco recorded population of 22,835 inhabitantes in 38 localities. Naolinco de Victoria, the municipal seat, it's the only one classified as urban, with a population of 9,554 hab. Other localities include El Espinal (2,050 hab.), San Pablo Coapan (1,712 hab.), San Marcos Atesquilapan (1,677 hab.) and 4 soles (1,576 hab.).
