= Jalacingo =

- Municipality
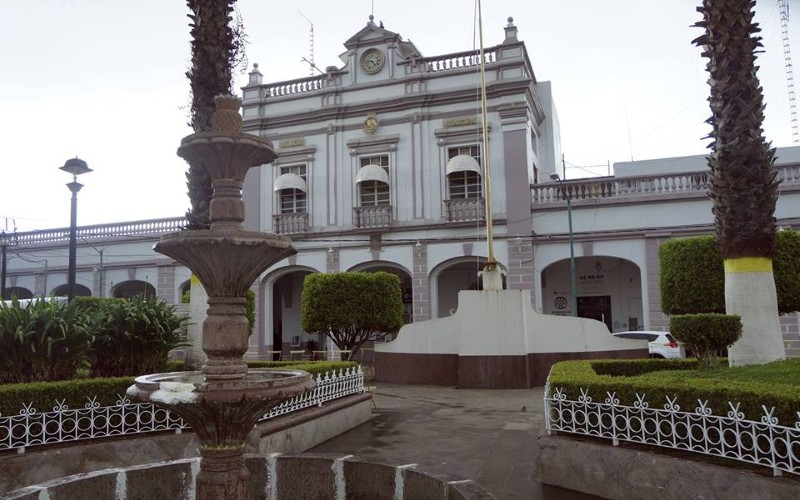
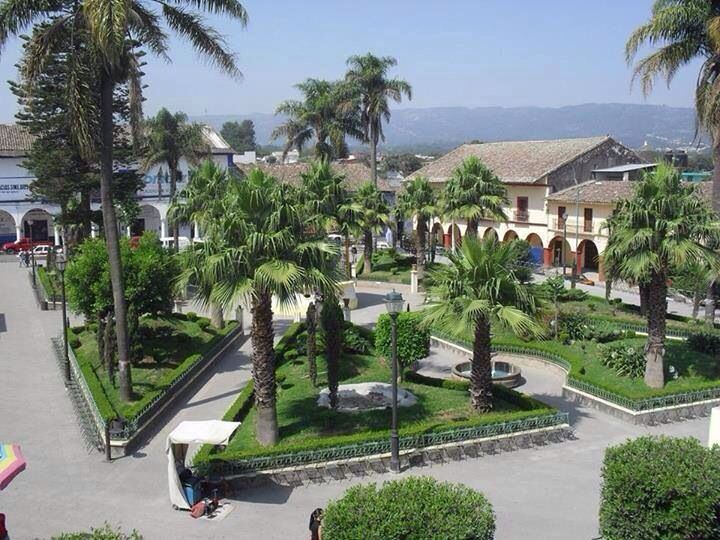
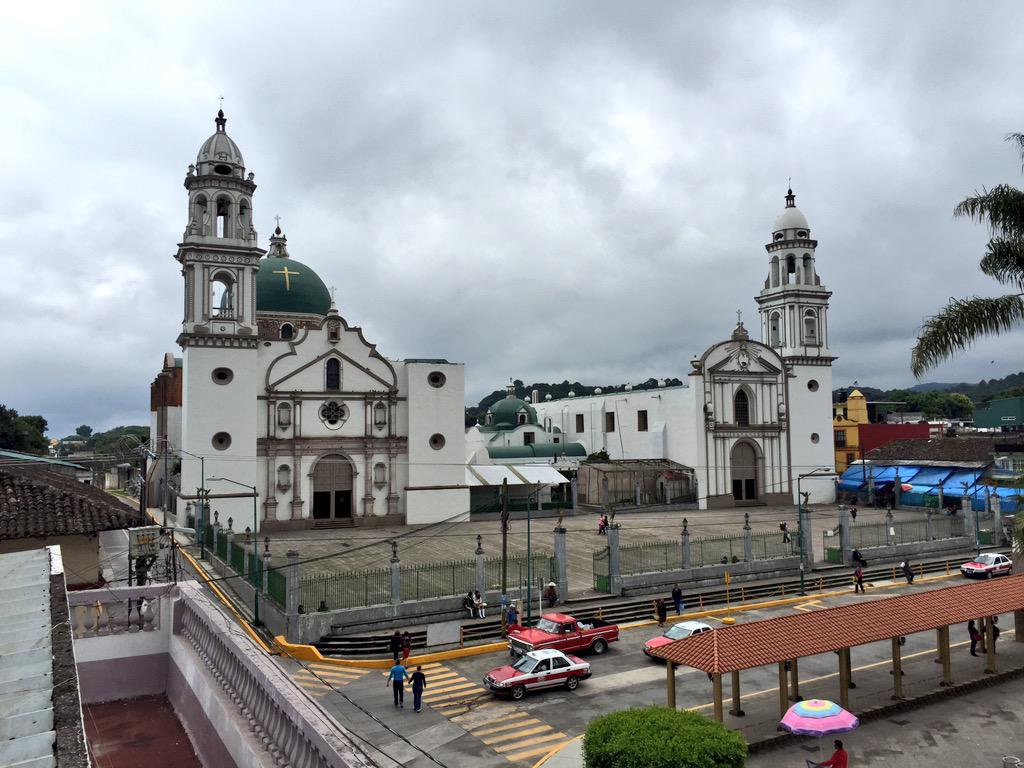
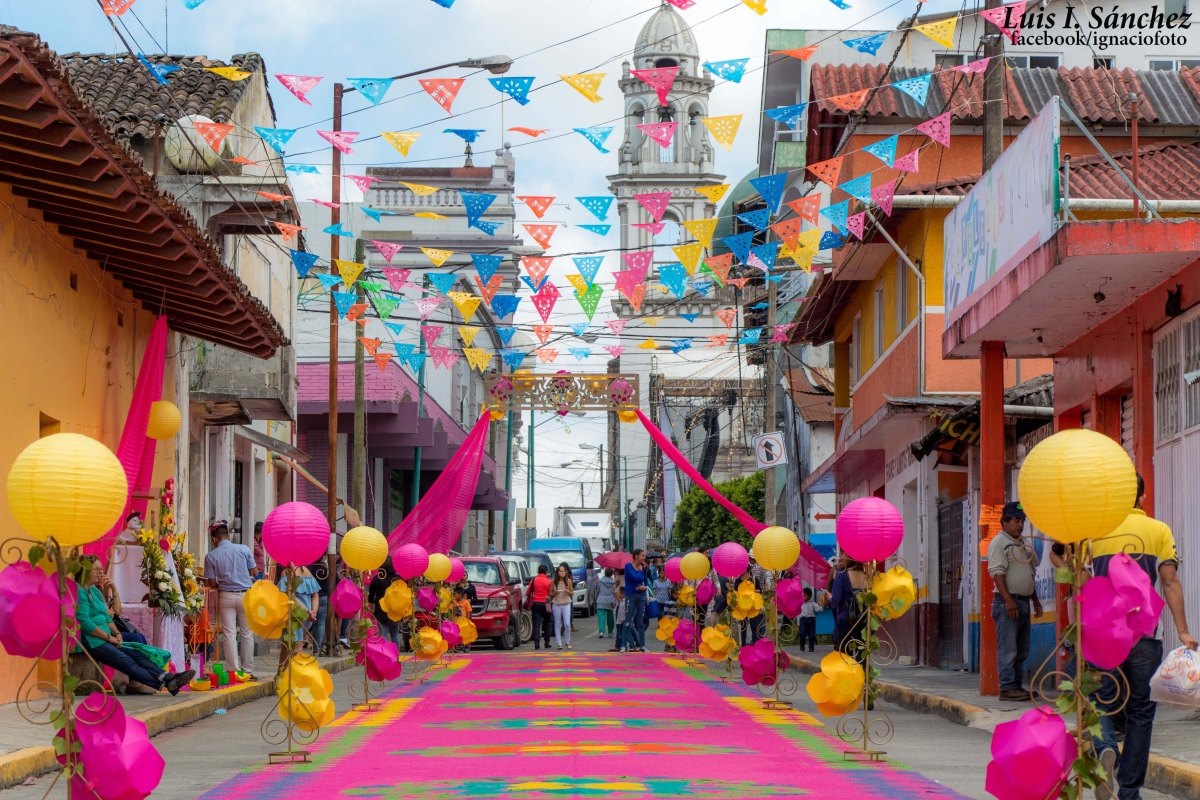
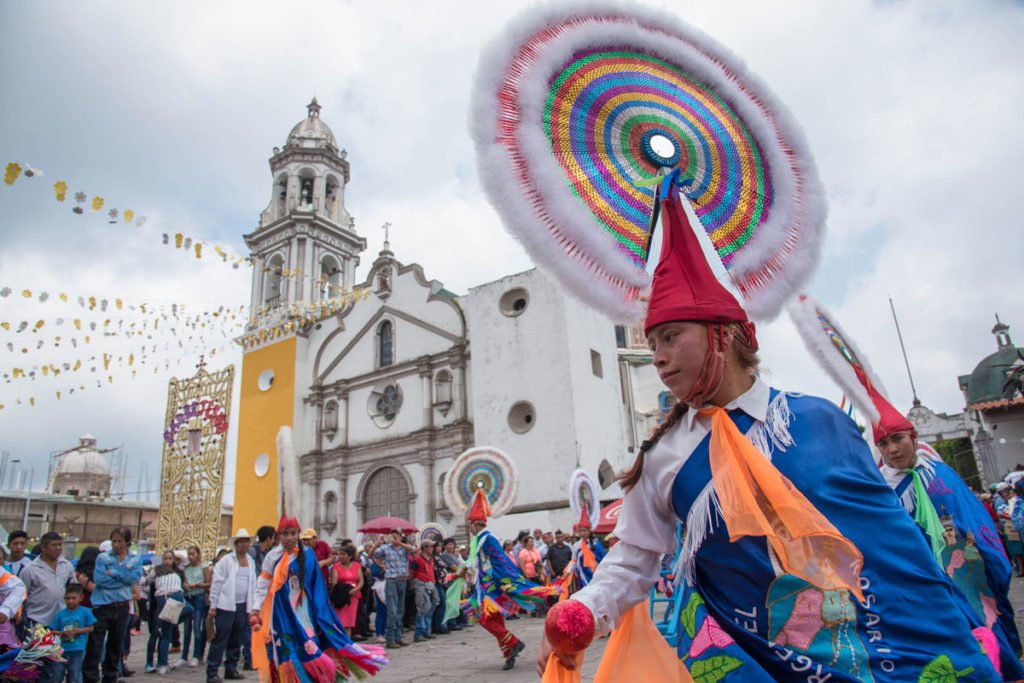
- Top: Jalacingo Municipal Palace; Middle: Jalacingo main plaza, San Bartolomé Church; Bottom: Jalacingo festivities at August 6th

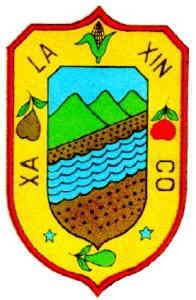
- Coat of arms

- Location in Mexico Jalacingo (Mexico)
- Coordinates: 19°36′00″N 97°13′00″W
- Country: Mexico
- State: Veracruz
- Region: Capital Region
- Municipal seat and largest town: Jalacingo

Government
  - Municipal President: Roberto Perdomo Chino (PVEM)

Area
  - Total: 208.1 km^{2} (80.3 sq mi)
- Elevation (of seat): 2,064 m (6,772 ft)

Population (2020)
  - Total: 46,794
  - Density: 224.8/km^{2} (582/sq mi)
  - Seat: 15,807
- Time zone: UTC-6 (Central (US Central))
- Postal code (of seat): 93660
- Website: (in Spanish)

Historical population
Year	Pop.	±%
1995	29,077	—
2000	33,399	+14.9%
2005	37,719	+12.9%
2010	40,747	+8.0%
2015	44,488	+9.2%
2020	46,794	+5.2%

Jalacingo is a municipality located in the central area of the Mexican state of Veracruz, in the region called the Capital, on the border with the state of Puebla. It is located at the coordinates 19°36'N 97°13'W, the city has a height of 1860 meters above sea level, while the height of the municipality varies from 600 to 2900 meters above sea level.

== Demographics ==
As of 2020, the municipality had a population of 46,794 inhabitants in 39 localities. About 30% resides in the municipal seat; other localities include Mixquiapan (3,067 hab.), Orilla del Monte (2,680 hab.), Ocotepec (2,559 hab.), and Vista Hermosa (2,198 hab.).
