= Tenochtitlán, Veracruz =

Municipality in Veracruz, Mexico

Tenochtitlán
- Municipality
- Location of Tenochtitlán in Veracruz
- Coordinates: 19°48′N 96°55′W
- Country: Mexico
- State: Veracruz
- Municipality: Tenochtitlán
- Elevation: 900 m (3,000 ft)

Population (2000)
  - Total: 5,600
- Time zone: UTC-6 (Central Standard Time)
- Postal code: 93780–93789
- Area code: 235
- Website: Official Website

Tenochtitlán is a municipality in the Mexican state of Veracruz, and the name of the main township which serves as the seat of the municipal government. It is located in the foothills of the Sierra Madre, with the township lying at an altitude of approximately 900 m (2953 ft) above mean sea level.

In the year 2000 census, the municipality reported a total population of slightly over 5600 people. The same census also revealed that the municipality had no hotels, no restaurants, no cafeterias, no bars, and no discothèques or night-clubs.

The town and the municipality are both named after Tenochtitlan, the capital of the Aztec Empire prior to the Spanish conquest.
