= Xico, Veracruz =

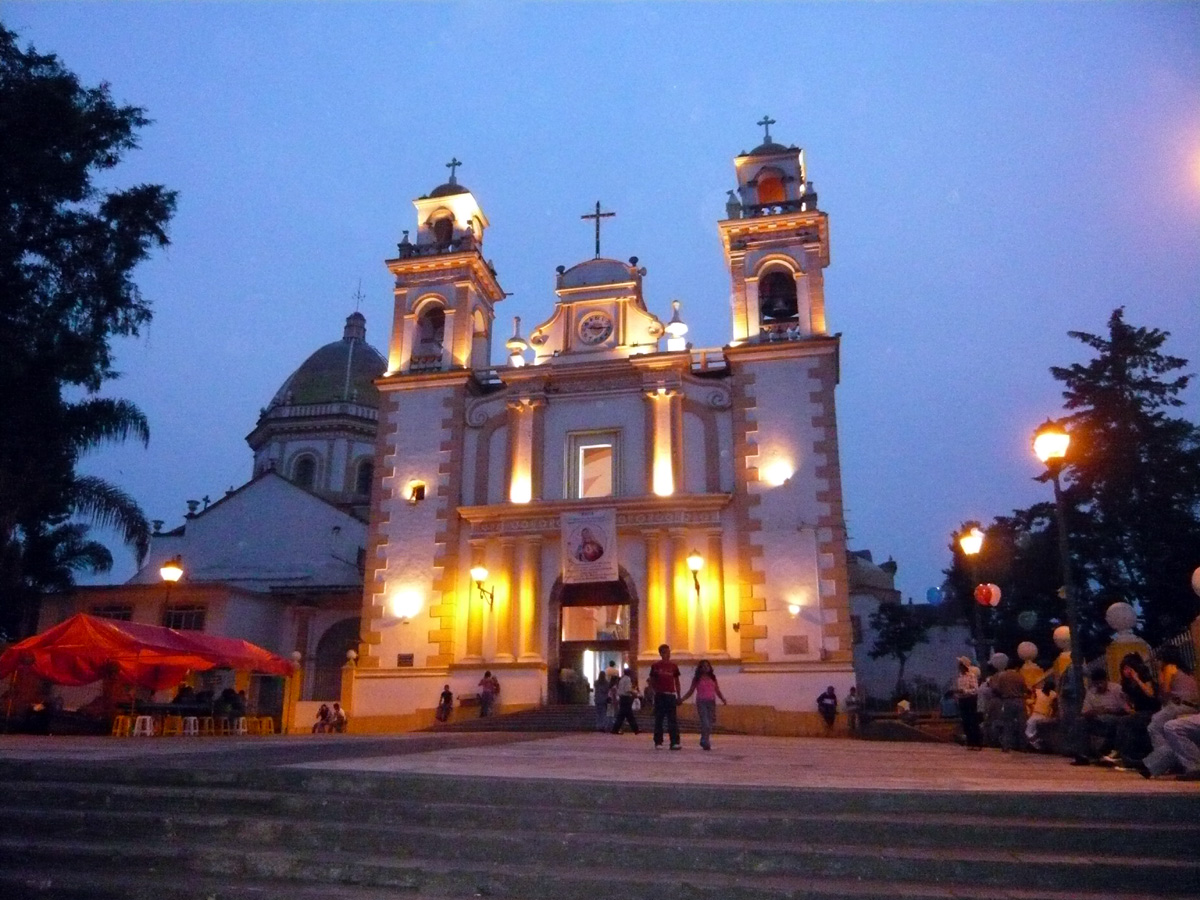
- Church of Santa María Magdalena

- Location within Veracruz
- Coordinates: 19.417°N 97.000°W
- Country: Mexico
- State: Veracruz
- Region: Capital Region

Area
  - Total: 180 km^{2} (69 sq mi)

Population (2010)
  - Total: 18,652
  - Municipality: 35,188

Xico (Spanish pronunciation: ['xi.ko]) is a city and municipality located in the central part of the Mexican state of Veracruz. It produces coffee, tropical fruit, wine, handicrafts, and other products. A regional special dish is their variant of mole known as Mole Xico or Xiqueño which consists of 25+ ingredients and is comparatively sweeter to other dark moles such as mole poblano due to the use of more fruits. It is 25 km from the state capital Xalapa. Every year in July, Xico has a very large bullfighting event. In 2006, Veracruz Governor Fidel Herrera attended the event.

In 2011, Xico earned the designation of Pueblo Mágico from Mexico's federal tourism sector.

Three kilometres outside the town is Cascada de Texolo.
