= Atzalán =

City in Veracruz, Mexico

Coordinates: 19°47′00″N 97°14′00″W

- Municipality
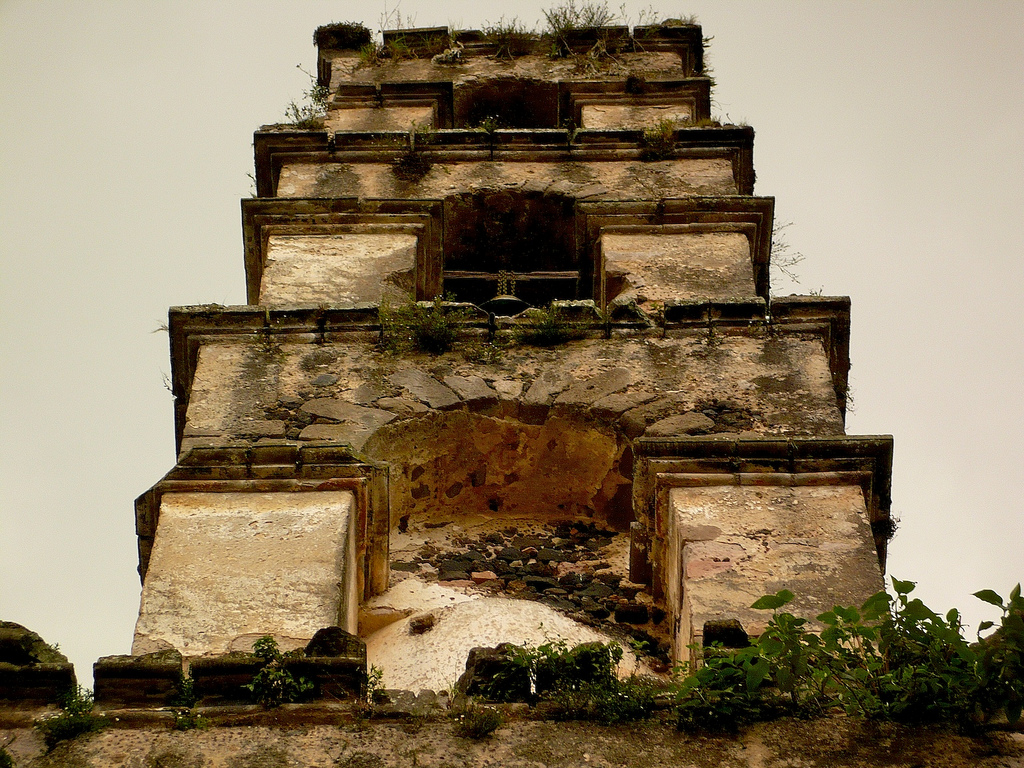

- Location in Mexico Atzalán (Mexico)
- Country: Mexico
- State: Veracruz
- Demonym: (in Spanish)
- Time zone: UTC−6 (CST)

Atzalán is a city in the Mexican state of Veracruz, and the municipal seat of the municipality of the same name.

It is located at, some 45 km northwest of the state capital Xalapa.
