= 15th federal electoral district of Veracruz =

Federal electoral district of Mexico

Veracruz's 15th
- Electoral district of the Chamber of Deputies of Mexico

- 15th district since 2023

Incumbent
- Member: Corina Villegas Guarneros
- Party: ▌Morena
- Congress: 66th (2024–2027)

District
- State: Veracruz
- Head town: Orizaba
- Coordinates: 18°51′N 97°06′W
- Covers: 12 municipalities: Alpatláhuac, Atzacan, Calcahualco, Chocamán, Coscomatepec, Huiloapan, Ixhuatlancillo, La Perla, Mariano Escobedo, Orizaba, Río Blanco, Tomatlán
- PR region: Third
- Precincts: 211
- Population: 409,230 (2020 census)

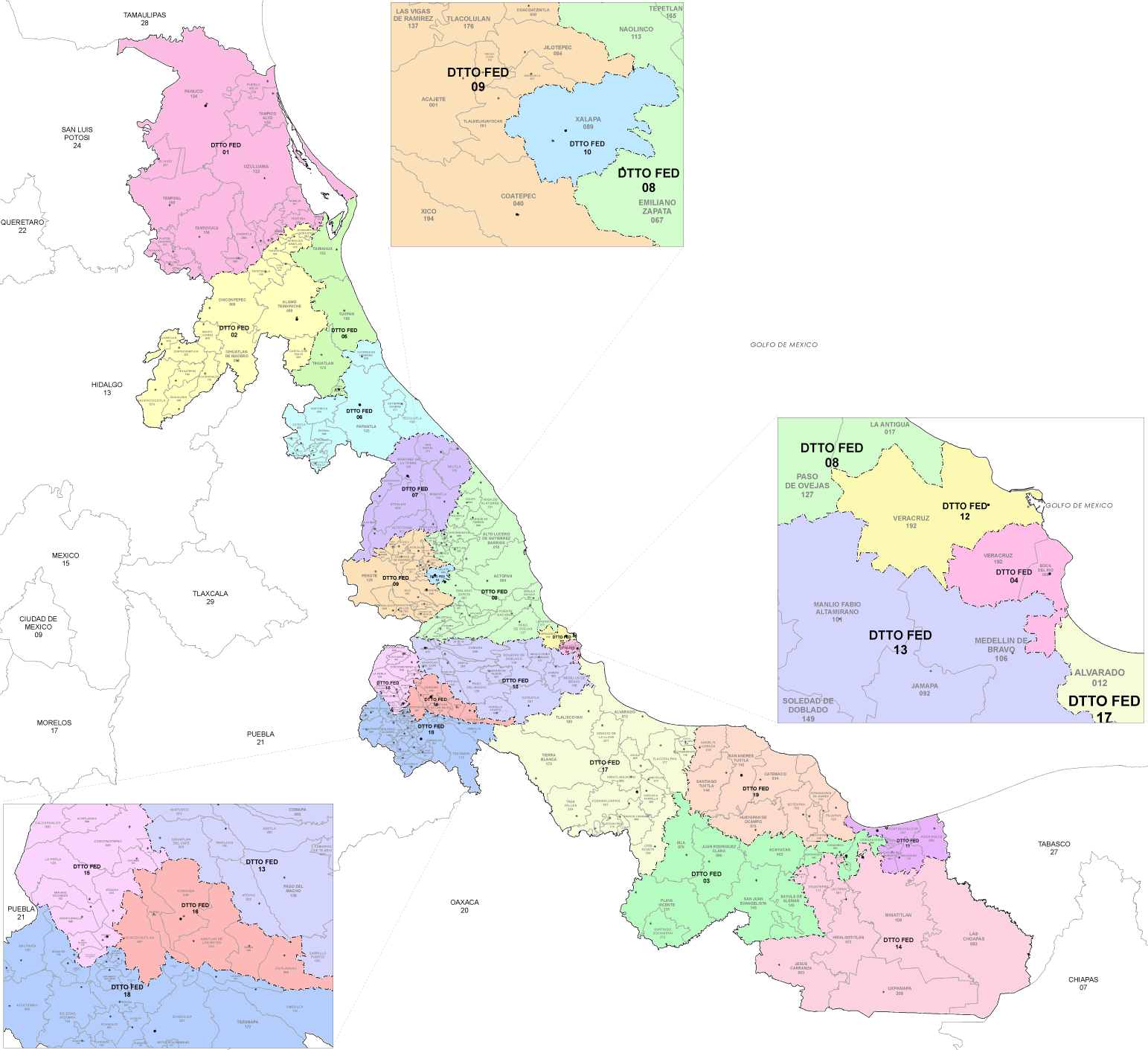
Veracruz's 2023 districts

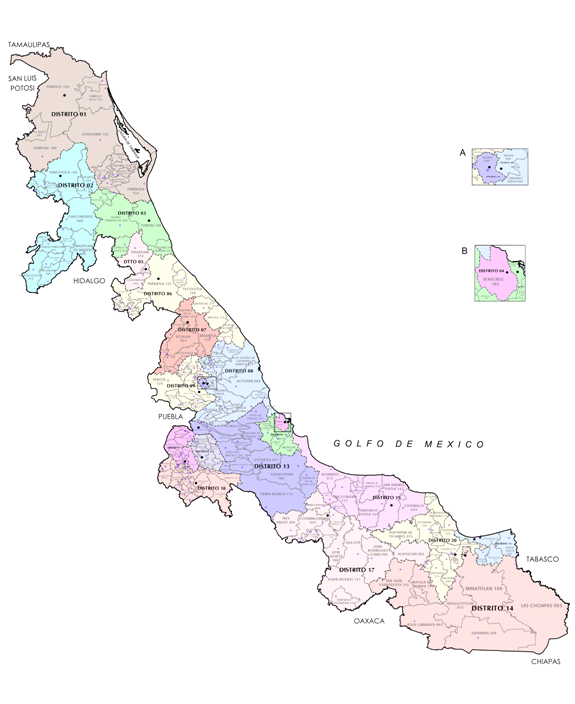
Veracruz under the 2017–2022 districting plan

The 15th federal electoral district of Veracruz (Spanish: Distrito electoral federal 15 de Veracruz) is one of the 300 electoral districts into which Mexico is divided for elections to the federal Chamber of Deputies and one of 19 such districts in the state of Veracruz.

It elects one deputy to the lower house of Congress for each three-year legislative session by means of the first-past-the-post system. Votes cast in the district also count towards the calculation of proportional representation ("plurinominal") deputies elected from the third region.

The current member for the district, re-elected in the 2024 general election, is Dulce María Corina Villegas Guarneros of the National Regeneration Movement (Morena).

== District territory ==
Veracruz lost a congressional district in the 2023 districting plan adopted by the National Electoral Institute (INE), which is to be used for the 2024, 2027 and 2030 elections. The reconfigured 15th district covers 211 electoral precincts (secciones electorales) across 12 municipalities in the state's Mountains region:

- Alpatláhuac, Atzacan, Calcahualco, Chocamán, Coscomatepec, Huiloapan de Cuauhtémoc, Ixhuatlancillo, La Perla, Mariano Escobedo, Orizaba, Río Blanco and Tomatlán.

The head town (cabecera distrital), where results from individual polling stations are gathered together and tallied, is the city of Orizaba. The district reported a population of 409,230 in the 2020 census.

== Previous districting schemes ==
Evolution of electoral district numbers
	1974	1978	1996	2005	2017	2023
Veracruz	15	23	23	21	20	19
Chamber of Deputies	196	300				

Because of shifting demographics, Veracruz currently has four fewer districts than the 23 the state was allocated under the 1977 electoral reforms.

2017–2022

Between 2017 and 2022, Veracruz was assigned 20 electoral districts. The 15th district comprised 10 municipalities in the same region as under the 2022 plan:
- Alpatláhuac, Atzacan, Calcahualco, Coscomatepec, Ixhuatlancillo, Ixtaczoquitlán, Mariano Escobedo, Orizaba, La Perla and Río Blanco.
The head town was the city of Orizaba.

2005–2017

Veracruz's allocation of congressional seats fell to 21 in the 2005 redistricting process. Between 2005 and 2017 the 15th district had its head town at Orizaba and it comprised 13 municipalities:
- Alpatlahuac, Aquila, Calcahualco, Coscomatepec, Chocamán, Ixhuatlancillo, Maltrata, Mariano Escobedo, Nogales, Orizaba, La Perla, Río Blanco and Tomatlán.

1996–2005

Under the 1996 districting plan, which allocated Veracruz 23 districts, the head town was at Orizaba and the district covered 13 municipalities.

1978–1996

The districting scheme in force from 1978 to 1996 was the result of the 1977 electoral reforms, which increased the number of single-member seats in the Chamber of Deputies from 196 to 300. Under that plan, Veracruz's seat allocation rose from 15 to 23. The 15th district had its head town at Coatzacoalcos in the south of the state and it covered the municipalities of Coatzacoalcos, Ixhuatlán del Sureste and Moloacán.

== Deputies returned to Congress ==
(Mexico) National parties
- Current
- PAN
- PRI
- PT
- PVEM
- MC
- Morena
- PAZ
- Somos
- Defunct or local only
- PLM
- PNR
- PRM
- PNM
- PP
- PPS
- PARM
- PFCRN
- CON
- PANAL
- PSD
- PES
- PES
- PRD

Veracruz's 15th district
Election	Deputy	Party	Term	Legislature
1916	Cándido Aguilar		1916–1917	Constituent Congress of Querétaro
...
1973	Manuel Ramos Gurrión	Institutional Revolutionary Party	1973–1976	49th Congress
1976	Eduardo Thomac Domínguez	Institutional Revolutionary Party	1976–1979	50th Congress
1979	Francisco Mata Aguilar	Institutional Revolutionary Party	1979–1982	51st Congress
1982	Carlos Brito Gómez	Institutional Revolutionary Party	1982–1985	52nd Congress
1985	Héctor Sen Flores	Institutional Revolutionary Party	1985–1988	53rd Congress
1988	Marco Antonio Castellanos López	Authentic Party of the Mexican Revolution	1988–1991	54th Congress
1991	Fernando Arturo Charleston Salinas	Institutional Revolutionary Party	1991–1994	55th Congress
1994	Amado Cruz Malpica	Party of the Democratic Revolution	1994–1997	56th Congress
1997	Aquileo Herrera Munguía	Institutional Revolutionary Party	1997–2000	57th Congress
2000	Manuel Orozco Garza	National Action Party (Mexico)	2000–2003	58th Congress
2003	Tomás Trueba Gracian	National Action Party (Mexico)	2003–2006	59th Congress
2006	Gerardo Lagunes Gallina	Institutional Revolutionary Party	2006–2009	60th Congress
2009	Fidel Kuri Grajales	Institutional Revolutionary Party	2009–2012	61st Congress
2012	Juan Manuel Diez Francos; Juan Isidro del Bosque Márquez	Institutional Revolutionary Party	2012–2013; 2013–2015	62nd Congress
2015	Fidel Kuri Grajales	Institutional Revolutionary Party	2015–2018	63rd Congress
2018	Corina Villegas Guarneros	National Regeneration Movement	2018–2021	64th Congress
2021	Corina Villegas Guarneros	National Regeneration Movement	2021–2024	65th Congress
2024	Corina Villegas Guarneros	National Regeneration Movement	2024–2027	66th Congress

== Presidential elections ==
Veracruz's 15th district
Election	District won by	Party or coalition	%
2018	Andrés Manuel López Obrador	Juntos Haremos Historia	56.1990
2024	Claudia Sheinbaum Pardo	Sigamos Haciendo Historia	63.2825
