= Mountains Region =

Region of Veracruz, Mexico

- Region
- In Veracruz
- Country: Mexico
- State: Veracruz
- Largest city: Córdoba

Area
  - Total: 6,032 km^{2} (2,329 sq mi)

Population (2020)
  - Total: 1,499,920
- Time zone: UTC−6 (Central)

The Mountains Region is one of the regions of the Mexican state of Veracruz. It is located in the Sierra Madre Oriental mountain range and includes the Pico de Orizaba, an active volcano and Mexico's highest mountain. Its largest cities are Córdoba and Orizaba.

== Municipalities ==
Municipality code	Name	Population		Land Area			Population density	
Municipality code	Name	2020	Rank	km^{2}	sq mi	Rank	2020	Rank
006	Acultzingo	23,100	23	168.9	65.2	10	137/km^{2} (354/sq mi)	43
008	Alpatláhuac	10,338	38	70.9	27.4	27	146/km^{2} (378/sq mi)	39
014	Amatlán de los Reyes	46,955	8	151.4	58.5	13	310/km^{2} (803/sq mi)	19
018	Aquila	1,978	57	20.7	8.0	49	96/km^{2} (247/sq mi)	49
019	Astacinga	6,909	43	29.8	11.5	44	232/km^{2} (600/sq mi)	25
020	Atlahuilco	11,577	37	62.2	24.0	34	186/km^{2} (482/sq mi)	29
021	Atoyac	23,461	21	122.8	47.4	20	191/km^{2} (495/sq mi)	32
022	Atzacan	22,651	24	63.4	24.5	33	346/km^{2} (346/km^{2})	16
029	Calcahualco	13,701	33	134.1	51.8	17	102/km^{2} (265/sq mi)	47
007	Camarón de Tejeda	6,538	44	124.1	47.9	19	53/km^{2} (136/sq mi)	56
030	Camerino Z. Mendoza	41,835	10	20.9	8.1	48	2,002/km^{2} (5,184/sq mi)	3
031	Carrillo Puerto	18,888	27	249.7	96.4	6	76/km^{2} (196/sq mi)	51
062	Chocamán	20,839	25	44.3	17.1	39	470/km^{2} (1,218/sq mi)	12
041	Coetzala	2,355	56	9.4	3.6	57	251/km^{2} (649/sq mi)	21
043	Comapa	19,876	26	310.9	120.0	3	64/km^{2} (166/sq mi)	54
044	Córdoba	204,721	1	159.9	61.7	11	1,280/km^{2} (3,316/sq mi)	4
047	Coscomatepec	59,471	6	158.1	61.0	12	376/km^{2} (974/sq mi)	15
052	Cuichapa	11,869	36	34.7	13.4	42	342/km^{2} (886/sq mi)	17
053	Cuitláhuac	28,075	17	150.3	58.0	14	187/km^{2} (484/sq mi)	28
068	Fortín	66,372	4	61.2	23.6	35	1,085/km^{2} (2,809/sq mi)	5
071	Huatusco	59,920	5	202.9	78.3	8	295/km^{2} (765/sq mi)	20
074	Huiloapan de Cuauhtémoc	7,293	41	18.7	7.2	51	390/km^{2} (1,010/sq mi)	13
080	Ixhuatlán del Café	23,132	22	129.3	49.9	18	179/km^{2} (463/sq mi)	33
081	Ixhuatlancillo	27,295	18	52.4	20.2	38	521/km^{2} (1,349/sq mi)	10
085	Ixtaczoquitlán	74,004	3	137.4	53.1	16	539/km^{2} (1,395/sq mi)	9
127	La Perla	28,258	16	137.9	53.2	15	205/km^{2} (531/sq mi)	26
137	Los Reyes	6,308	46	34.2	13.2	43	184/km^{2} (478/sq mi)	30
098	Magdalena	3,299	54	13.8	5.3	55	239/km^{2} (619/sq mi)	24
099	Maltrata	18,327	28	110.6	42.7	22	166/km^{2} (429/sq mi)	35
101	Mariano Escobedo	38,670	12	69.5	26.8	28	556/km^{2} (1,441/sq mi)	8
110	Mixtla de Altamirano	12,125	35	66.5	25.7	29	182/km^{2} (472/sq mi)	31
113	Naranjal	4,614	50	18.6	7.2	52	248/km^{2} (642/sq mi)	22
115	Nogales	37,314	13	64.4	24.9	32	579/km^{2} (1,501/sq mi)	7
117	Omealca	23,773	20	213.8	82.5	7	111/km^{2} (288/sq mi)	45
118	Orizaba	123,182	2	27.7	10.7	45	4,447/km^{2} (11,518/sq mi)	1
125	Paso del Macho	31,894	14	400.6	154.7	2	80/km^{2} (206/sq mi)	50
135	Rafael Delgado	24,127	19	26.4	10.2	45	914/km^{2} (2,367/sq mi)	6
138	Río Blanco	41,795	11	15.2	5.9	54	2,750/km^{2} (7,122/sq mi)	2
140	San Andrés Tenejapan	3,134	55	21.9	8.5	47	143/km^{2} (371/sq mi)	41
146	Sochiapa	3,925	53	16.3	6.3	53	241/km^{2} (624/sq mi)	23
147	Soledad Atzompa	4,433	51	114.7	44.3	21	39/km^{2} (100/sq mi)	57
159	Tehuipango	29,686	15	87.9	33.9	25	338/km^{2} (875/sq mi)	27
162	Tenampa	6,448	45	65.2	25.2	31	99/km^{2} (256/sq mi)	48
165	Tepatlaxco	8,925	39	60.2	23.2	36	148/km^{2} (384/sq mi)	38
168	Tequila	16,343	32	100	39	23	163/km^{2} (423/sq mi)	34
171	Texhuacán	5,575	48	42.7	16.5	40	131/km^{2} (338/sq mi)	44
173	Tezonapa	54,537	7	522.5	201.7	1	104/km^{2} (270/sq mi)	46
179	Tlacotepec de Mejía	4,284	52	65.3	25.2	30	66/km^{2} (170/sq mi)	53
024	Tlaltetela	16,485	31	277.8	107.3	5	59/km^{2} (154/sq mi)	55
184	Tlaquilpa	7,933	40	56.4	21.8	37	141/km^{2} (364/sq mi)	42
185	Tlilapan	5,548	49	11.2	4.3	56	495/km^{2} (1,283/sq mi)	11
186	Tomatlán	7,197	42	18.8	7.3	50	383/km^{2} (991/sq mi)	14
188	Totutla	17,217	30	97.9	37.8	24	176/km^{2} (455/sq mi)	18
195	Xoxocotla	5,900	47	37.4	14.4	41	158/km^{2} (409/sq mi)	37
196	Yanga	17,902	29	87.9	33.9	26	204/km^{2} (527/sq mi)	40
200	Zentla	12,581	34	178.1	68.8	9	71/km^{2} (183/sq mi)	52
201	Zongolica	45,028	9	282.6	109.1	4	159/km^{2} (413/sq mi)	36
	Montañas Region	1,499,920	—	6,032	2,328.97	—	249/km^{2} (644/sq mi)	—
Source: INEGI

=== Largest cities ===
Largest cities or towns in Mountains Region Source:
Rank		Municipality	Pop.
1	Córdoba	Córdoba	139,075
2	Orizaba	Orizaba	120,500
3	Río Blanco	Río Blanco	41,785
4	Ciudad Mendoza	Camerino Z. Mendoza	34,847
5	Huastusco de Chicuellar	Huatusco	33,402
6	Ixtaczoquitlán	Ixtaczoquitlán	30,131
7	Amatlán de los Reyes	Amatlán de los Reyes	22,798
8	Fortín de las Flores	Fortín	21,708
9	Nogales	Nogales	21,261
10	Coscomatepec de Bravo	Coscomatepec	16,364
