= 1920 Xalapa earthquake =

Earthquake in Mexico

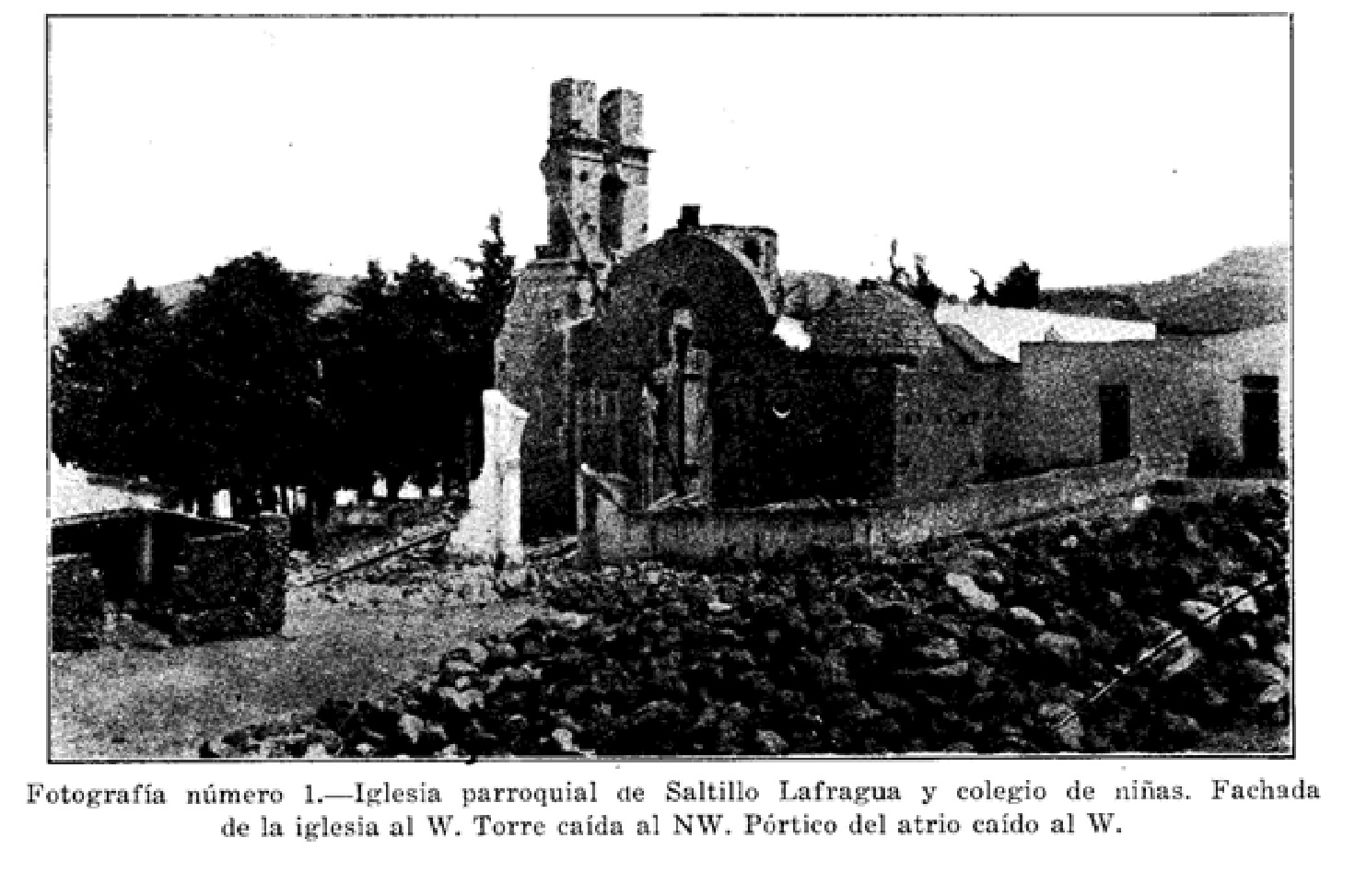
- A partially destroyed church in Saltillo Lafragua

- Location within Mexico
- UTC time: 1920-01-04 04:22:16
- ISC event: 912397
- USGS-ANSS: ComCat
- Local date: 3 January 1920
- Local time: 22:25 CST
- Magnitude: M_{w} 6.3–6.4
- Depth: 15 kilometres (9.3 mi)
- Epicenter: 19.27°N 97.08°W
- Type: Normal
- Areas affected: Veracruz; Puebla
- Max. intensity: MMI XII (Extreme)
- Aftershocks: continued until April 1920
- Casualties: 648–4,000 killed

A moment magnitude 6.3–6.4 earthquake affected southeastern Mexico, in the states of Puebla and Veracruz, on 3 January 1920 at 22:25 local time. A maximum Mercalli-Cancani intensity of XI–XII (Extreme) was recorded in the epicenter, between Chilchotla and Patlanalá. While estimates of the death toll vary across different sources, ranging from 648 to 4,000 fatalities, it is the second deadliest earthquake in Mexico, behind another earthquake in 1985 that killed more than 9,000 people. Many people died from mudslides that swept through settlements along the Huitzilapa and Pescado rivers. The cost of damage was estimated at US$25,000,000 (equivalent to $401,785,700 in 2025). The towns of Patlanalá, Barranca Grande, Cosautlán, Quimixtlán, Teocelo and Xalapa were severely affected, as many buildings were damaged or destroyed.

The earthquake occurred in a geological region of the North American plate called the Trans-Mexican Volcanic Belt. There are normal faults in the volcanic belt that form because the underlying crust undergoes extension. These earthquakes can occur near highly populated towns and pose a significant hazard. The 1920 earthquake may have been caused by rupture along one of these faults within the belt. After the earthquake, a seismograph was deployed in Xalapa to record the aftershocks. The data from the seismograph confirmed that the mainshock originated within the North American plate at a shallow depth.

The Veracruz government immediately provided assistance; Governor Cándido Aguilar formed a disaster relief board and travelled to several towns to participate in distributing resources. The devastated towns of Xalapa, Coatepec, Cosautlán, Coscomatepec, Patlanalá, Quimixtlán, Huatusco and Ayahualco were given government funds for reconstruction. Civil society groups and civilians also participated in relief efforts, joining relief committees and raising funds. Bishop Rafael Guízar y Valencia assisted in the relief efforts and donations, raising more than US$149,600 (equivalent to $2,403,500 in 2025) with the help of some newspapers that promoted his initiative. Civil society groups and civilians also participated in the relief effort, joining relief committees and raising funds. The Salvadoran and Honduran governments, as well as Pope Benedict XV, also contributed monetary aid.

== Tectonic setting ==
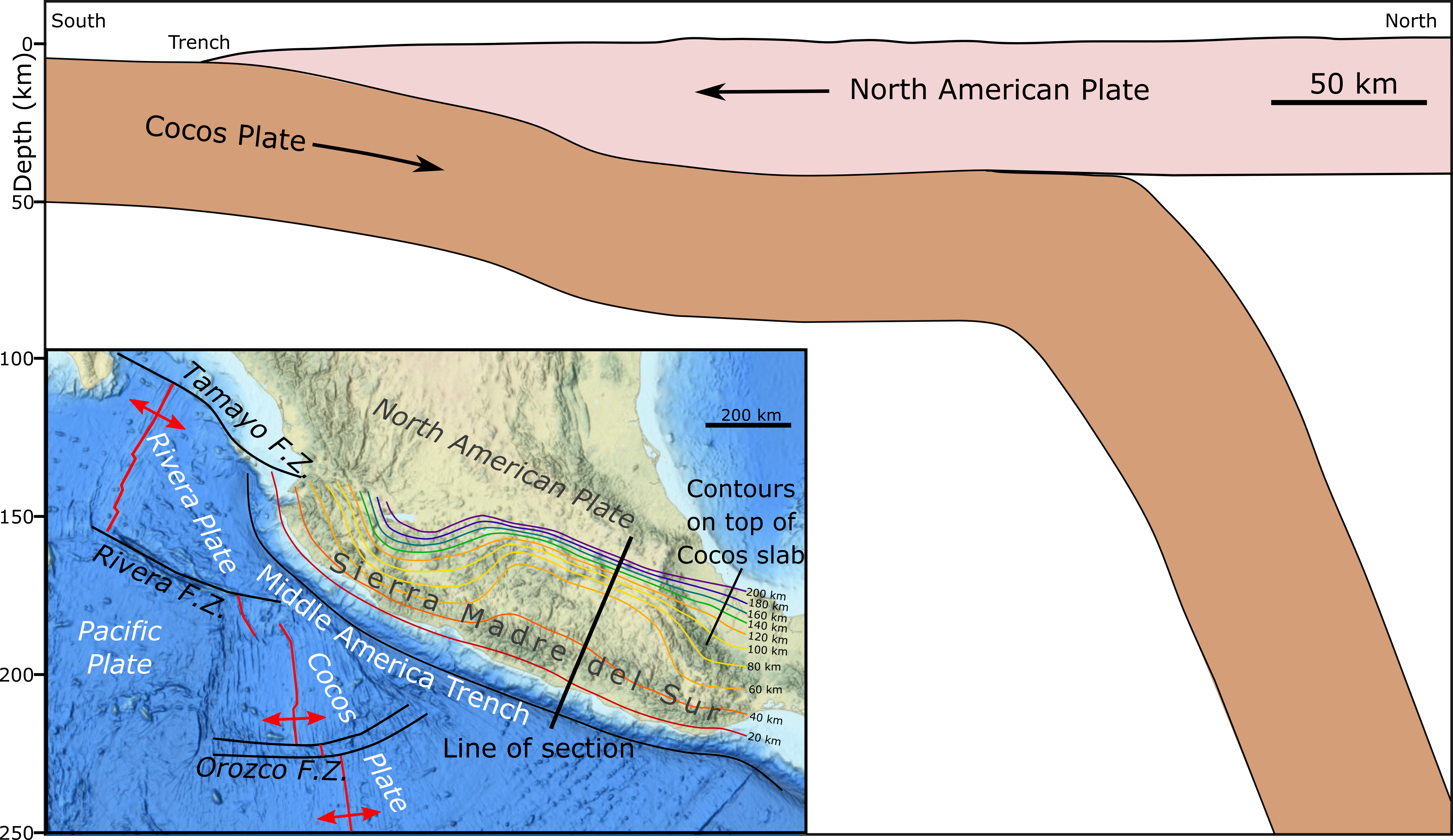
Cross-section diagram showing change from flat slab subduction to steep plunging of the Cocos plate beneath central Mexico. Inset map shows plate boundaries and depth contours on the top of the Cocos plate slab and section location

Three tectonic plates converge off Mexico's west coast. Most of Mexico, except Baja California, forms part of the westward-moving North American plate. Oceanic lithospheres of the Cocos and Rivera plates subduct northeastward along the Middle America Trench. Seismic strain at the subduction zone causes earthquakes and tsunamis when it is released. Volcanism occurs when the subducting plates (slabs) dehydrate during metamorphism: the released water causes the overlying mantle to partially melt and rise through the overriding North American plate, creating volcanoes. These volcanoes are distributed along a 1,000 km (620 mi) trend from the Pacific coast to the Gulf of Mexico, known as the Trans-Mexican Volcanic Belt (TMVB).

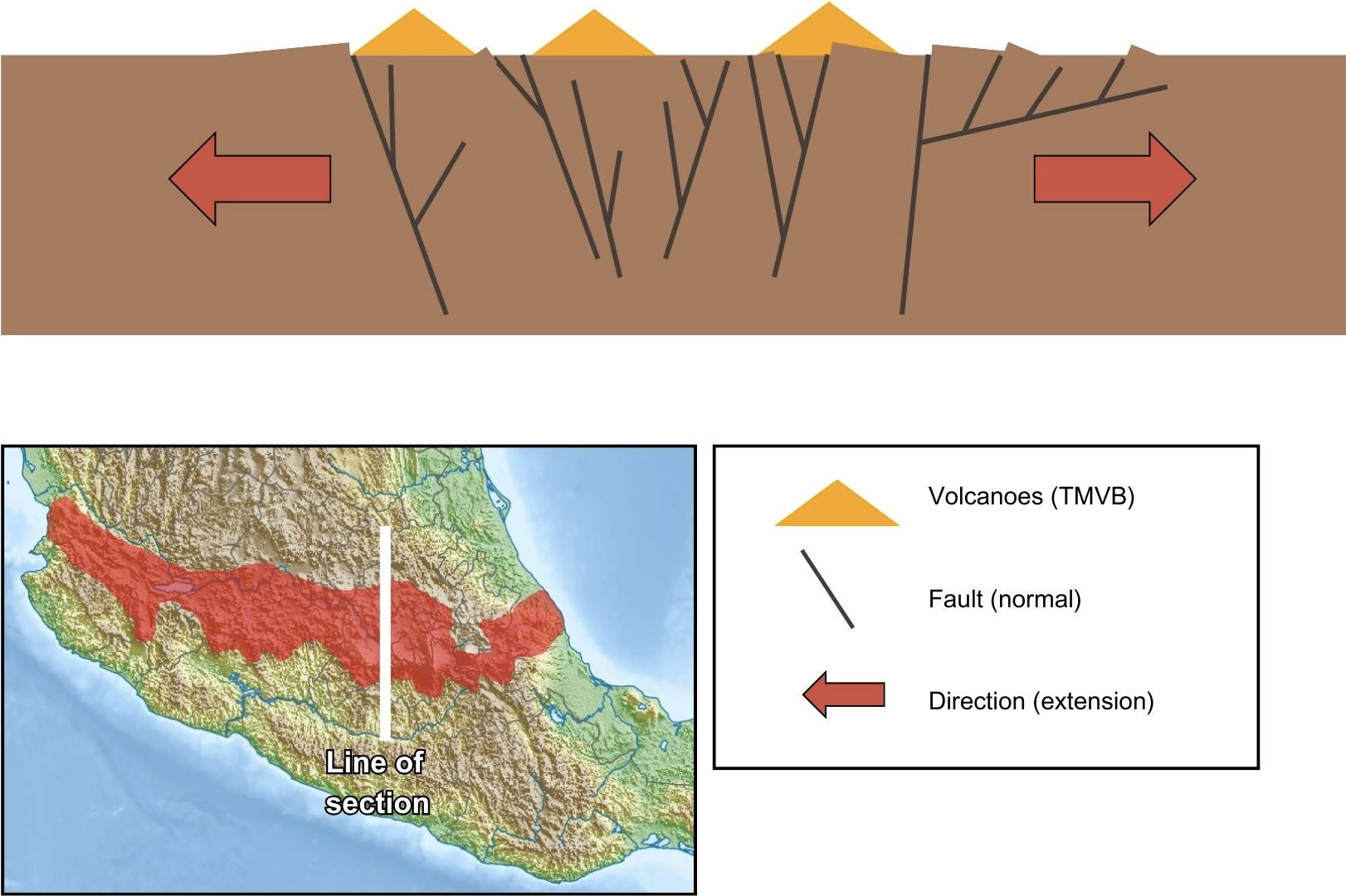
Normal faulting within the TMVB caused by extension

Volcanism usually occurs directly above slabs that undergo metamorphism at around 100 km (60 mi) depth. In southern Mexico, the slab reaches this depth 300 km (200 mi) from the trench. Beneath land, the Cocos plate generates earthquakes at 60–100 km (40–60 mi) depth, but these cease abruptly some 100 km (60 mi) south of the TMVB. North of where the intraslab seismicity ceases are shallow intraplate earthquakes within the TMVB. Crustal deformation in the TMVB is characterized by extension (Note: Stretching of the crust.) which occurs perpendicular to the general strike of the TMVB. East–west striking normal faults form because of extension; some of these fault scarps are mapped for up to 50 km (30 mi). These faults move at an average rate of 2 mm (0.079 in) per year and because of their active state, they can produce earthquakes.

Mexico is one of the world's most seismically active regions; nearly 52 million people (or 40 percent) of the population live around the TMVB. In 2008, the Comisión Federal de Electricidad published its seismic hazard model, classifying cities along the TMVB as a moderate-hazard region. Analysis of seismic records since 1912 indicated infrequent earthquakes, but extending the record to the 16th century revealed eight additional earthquakes of magnitude 5.0 to 7.6. A 2017 study in Geofísica Internacional re-evaluated earthquake records from 1858 and suggested a greater risk. The study estimated a return period of 150 years for M_{w} 7.0 or larger events using the instrumental and historical records. In contrast, solely analysing the instrumental record yielded a 12,000-year period. Although moderate in magnitude and occurring less frequent than subduction zone earthquakes, crustal events near cities such as Mexico City, Guadalajara, Puebla and Morelia can be destructive.

== Earthquake characteristics ==
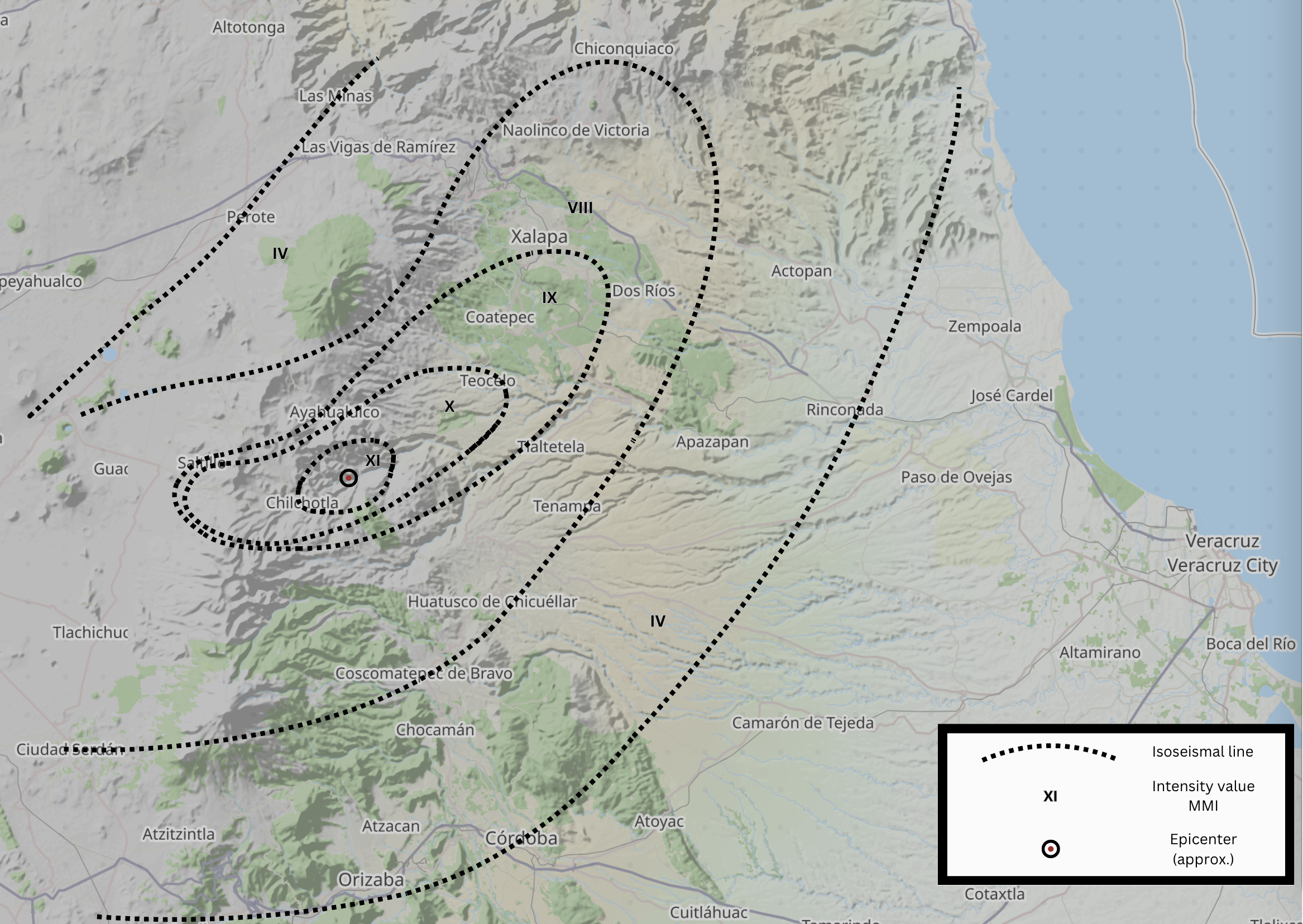
Isoseismal map illustrating the Mercalli-Cancani intensity distribution

The earthquake had a moment magnitude (M_{w}) of 6.3–6.4 and a hypocenter about 15 km (9.3 mi) beneath the surface. Although limited seismic data made determining the faulting mechanism challenging, the event was likely caused by movement on an east–west trending normal fault. Similar earthquakes in the TMVB with depths of less than 15 km (9.3 mi) have focal mechanisms corresponding to normal faulting, suggesting the mainshock had similar characteristics. Using scaling relationships between the seismic magnitude and rupture length, a fault length of 25 km (16 mi) was estimated. This length correlates with the extent of the meizoseismal area (Note: The area of maximum damage caused by an earthquake.). No ground faulting was observed, probably because it was too small, obscured by debris, or the rupture was entirely buried in the crust. A 1996 study in the Bulletin of the Seismological Society of America identified a 15 km (9.3 mi) east–northeast trending lineament near the meizoseismal area possibly being the fault.

Based on where the strongest shaking occurred, the epicenter was likely between the towns of Chilchotla and Patlanalá. A 70.8 km^{2} (27.3 sq mi) area, including Chilchotla, Ixhuacán, Quimixtlán and Patlanalá and the epicenter, was assigned a Mercalli-Cancani intensity of XI–XII (Extreme) based on the damage severity. The region surrounding the meizoseismal area experienced lower intensities: 433.6 km^{2} (167.4 sq mi) experienced intensity X, and 955.2 km^{2} (368.8 sq mi) experienced intensity IX. The plotted isoseismal lines outlining these zones formed a concave footprint-like shape extending east–southeast to west–northwest. In Xalapa, the assigned intensity was VIII–IX (Severe–Violent), and Ayahualulco, Cosautlán and Teocelo was IX–X (Violent–Extreme). Light shaking was felt in Mexico City and parts of Oaxaca's Teotitlán, Cuicatlán and San Jerónimo districts.

Foreshocks preceded two months earlier, while the aftershock sequence lasted until April 1920, with some felt 220 km (140 mi) away in Mexico City. To monitor the aftershocks, a Wiechert seismograph was installed in Xalapa. Data from the seismograph indicated that these aftershocks occurred 30–40 km (19–25 mi) away from the seismograph, confirming that the preceding mainshock occurred within the North American plate. In contrast, deeper intraslab earthquakes would be located further.

Veracruz experiences moderate seismicity compared to Mexico's Pacific coast, where the subduction zone causes frequent earthquakes. Since 1568, several earthquakes have occurred within the TMVB; the largest of which occurred in 1858 with an estimated magnitude of M_{w} 7.6. Large earthquakes in the TMVB are infrequent and the 1912 Acambay (M_{w} 6.9) and 1920 Xalapa events are the most recent M_{w} 6.0 or larger earthquakes. Some earthquakes affecting the state have epicenters outside the TMVB, such as in 1959 which occurred near the gulf coast.

== Damage and casualties ==
Deaths by location (Geological Institute of Mexico)
Location	Population	Deaths	Injuries
Ayahualulco, Ver.	3,899	25	no data
Barranca Grande, Ver.	300	180 (Note: All deaths caused by mudflow.)	no data
Cosautlán, Ver.	1,500	85	60
Ixhuacán, Ver.	3,305	1	no data
Patlanalá, Ver.	1,500	239 (Note: All but one death caused by mudflow.)	2
Quimixtlán, Pue.	no data	80	10
Teocelo, Ver.	5,000	35	85
Xalapa, Ver.	20,000	3	10
Total		648 (Note: This figure from the Geological Institute of Mexico is the lowest estimate available. Various sources also states 700, 800, 1,500 and 4,000 deaths for which, no statistics exists.)	167

Reports on the death toll vary widely. Early newspaper accounts estimated between 2,000 and 4,000 casualties, but a 1922 field report by the Geological Institute of Mexico documented 648 fatalities. Later studies, published in 1988, 1996, 2018, and 2019, estimated the deaths at 4,000, 1,500, 700, and 800, respectively. It is the second deadliest earthquake in Mexico's history, behind a M_{w} 8.0 event that struck Michoacan in 1985, killing more than 9,500.

The Catholic Telegraph reported the property damage at US$25,000,000 (equivalent to $401,785,700 in 2025). Many buildings in Xalapa, Coatepec, Teocelo, Cosautlán, Ixhuacán, Ayahualulco, Calcahualco, Coscomatepec, Alpatláhuac, Rinconada, Huatusco and Córdoba were affected. Masonry buildings in these areas that lacked seismic resistance were among the badly-affected structures. Some masonry buildings cracked while wooden homes were less damaged. A church, rectory, municipal building and shop were damaged or destroyed. In Teocelo, a church tower partially collapsed and its roof caved-in and destroyed the altar. Cracks also appeared in the nave arches while its walls were severely cracked or crumbled. A public office building and school were levelled.

The destruction in Saltillo Lafragua amounted to US$209,400 (Note: Historical cost in Mexican pesos: Mex$420,000) (equivalent to $3,364,900 in 2025) and only 51 of the 375 homes remained intact. Though most adobe buildings appeared externally intact, their interiors were damaged beyond use. In the town's eastern district, where masonry buildings were scarce and most homes were wooden jacales, the impact was less extreme. There were also few masonry buildings in Agua de la Mina and the damage was limited. In Chilchotla, a few wooden jacales were destroyed and a church tower partially collapsed. In Xalapa, the partial collapse of Dos Corazones church ruined nearby houses and injured several people, and an orphanage, government palace and municipal building were damaged. Nine streets including almost all the buildings on Enriquez Street were damaged. The city's hospital walls cracked but the building remained operational. In Orizaba, several people were killed when their homes collapsed while panic at a theater led several audience members to leap off the balcony, causing injuries.

The region's mountainous topography and 10 days of heavy precipitation destabilized slopes prior to 4 January. The earthquake triggered landslides that obstructed the Huitzilapa River and its tributaries. These landslide deposits combined with river debris, forming a mass that cascaded through multiple villages for 20 km (12 mi) and left a 10 m (33 ft) thick debris layer. Further downhill, it became a hyperconcentrated flow. After merging with the Pescado River near Teocelo, the flow travelled 80 km (50 mi) towards the Gulf of Mexico. It buried the villages of Acuatlatipa, El Rincón, Mecatitla and Petlacuacán along the way. Human and animal remains were strewn along the Pescado River bank and bodies were carried toward Jalcomulco and the Antigua River. The mountains in the area exhibited landslide scars of dislocated earth, vegetation and bedrock. Altogether, these landslides killed at least 419 people.

== Response ==
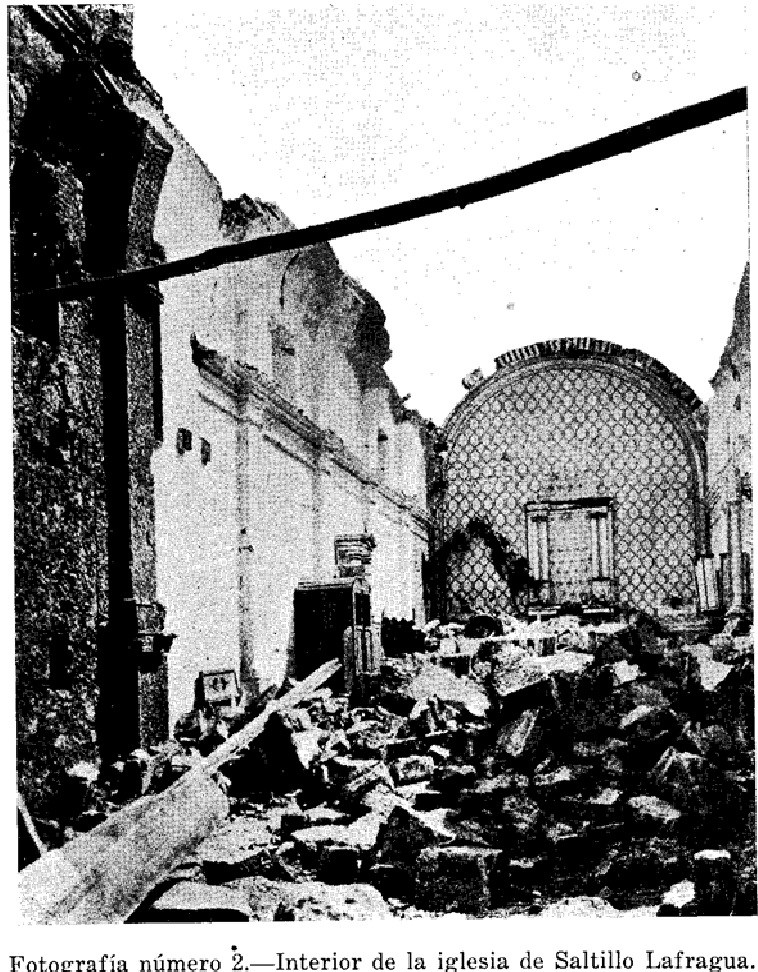
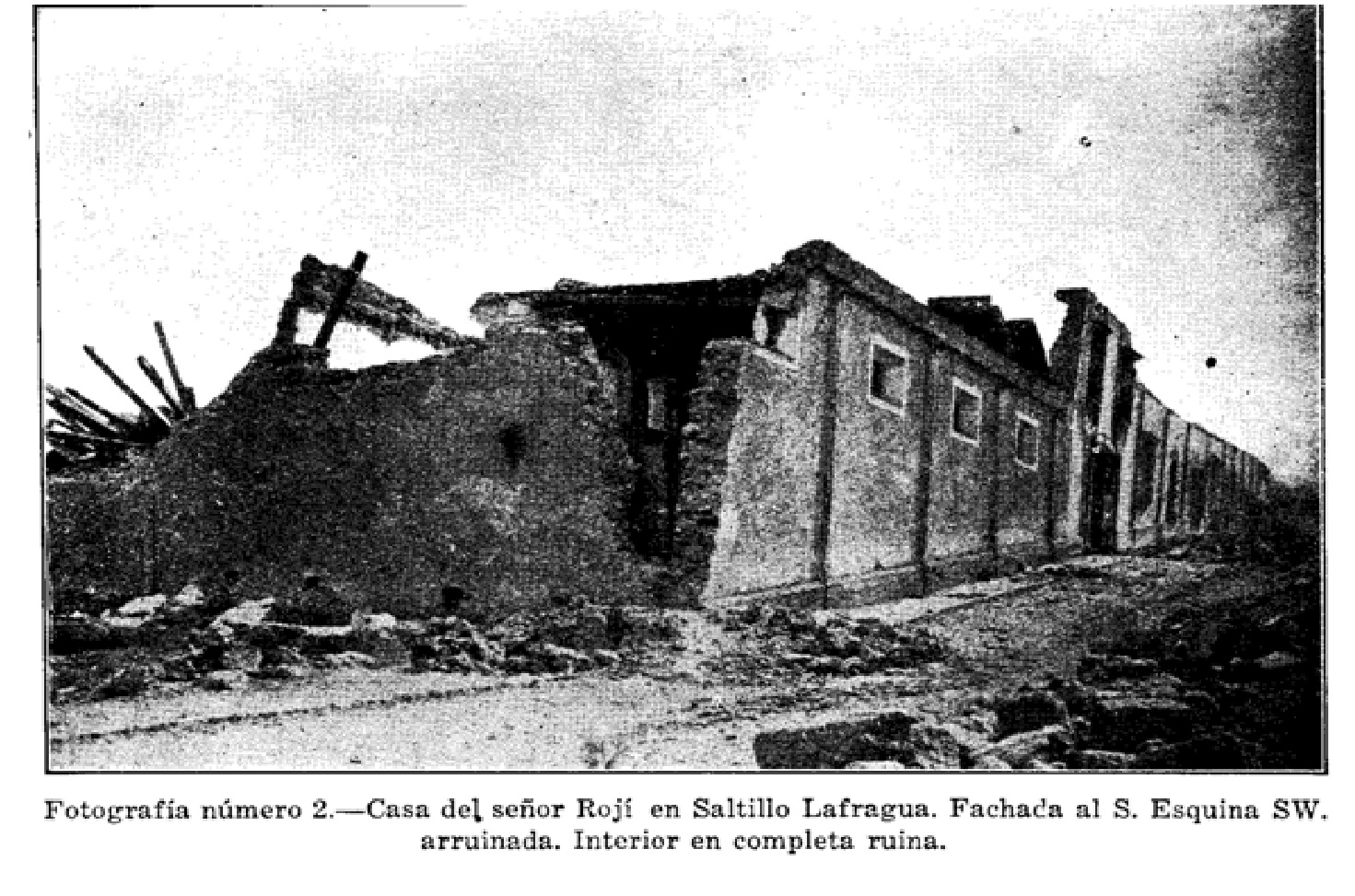
Ruins of a church and home in Saltillo Lafragua

Governmental and civilian relief efforts were immediately mobilised to provide aid. On 6 January, Veracruz governor Cándido Aguilar formed a disaster relief board and, with military assistance, traveled to four towns, distributing money, food and clothing. Under his supervision, public infrastructure and buildings were rebuilt, and refugee shelters were established in severely impacted areas such as Teocelo. Aguilar also ordered civic and military forces in affected towns to support Harry Hopkins and Haner Borst of the American Red Cross, who, accompanied by Catholic priest Francisco J. Krill, assessed the impact and offered aid. Additional Red Cross members and medical personnel treated the wounded and managed burials.

Charities and civil organizations contributed significantly to the recovery. The San Francisco de las Peñas municipal government initiated a donation drive, while some state employees donated a day's wages. For reconstruction, the local government allocated between US$2,500 (Note: Historical cost in Mexican pesos: Mex$5,000) (equivalent to $40,100 in 2025) and US$29,900 (Note: Historical cost in Mexican pesos: Mex$60,000) (equivalent to $480,700 in 2025) for each of the eight affected towns with Xalapa, Coatepec, and Cosautlán receiving the largest amount. They also reserved US$19,940 (Note: Historical cost in Mexican pesos: Mex$40,000) (equivalent to $320,500 in 2025) for affected individuals. The Sonora governor, Adolfo de la Huerta, donated US$2,000 (Note: Historical cost in Mexican pesos: Mex$4,000) (equivalent to $32,700 in 2025) to relief groups in Puebla and Veracruz. In Xalapa, the police inspected and evicted residents from buildings at risk of collapse. Restoring the government palace's ceiling lights, paintings, and decorations cost over US$6,600 (Note: Historical cost in Mexican pesos: Mex$13,300) (equivalent to $106,600 in 2025).

Rafael Guízar y Valencia, the Bishop of Veracruz, coordinated a donation drive. El Dictamen promoted and organised Guízar's fundraising efforts while in Mexico City, El Universal and Excélsior initiated public donation drives. With assistance from these newspapers, Guízar raised more than US$149,600 (Note: Historical cost in Mexican pesos: Mex$300,000) (equivalent to $2,403,500 in 2025) by 9 January. The Mexican diaspora in the United States also contributed to Guízar's fund, among them, the San Antonio-based Spanish-language newspaper La Presna raised US$15,000 (equivalent to $241,100 in 2025). In Teocelo, he preached a sermon and distributed US$1,500 (Note: Historical cost in Mexican pesos: Mex$3,000) (equivalent to $24,000 in 2025) to residents. The El Salvador and Honduras government and Red Cross donated US$10,000 (equivalent to $160,700 in 2025) each while Pope Benedict XV donated an undisclosed amount.

== See also ==
- Geography of Mexico
- List of earthquakes in Mexico
- List of earthquakes in 1920
