= La Perla, Veracruz =

- City and municipality
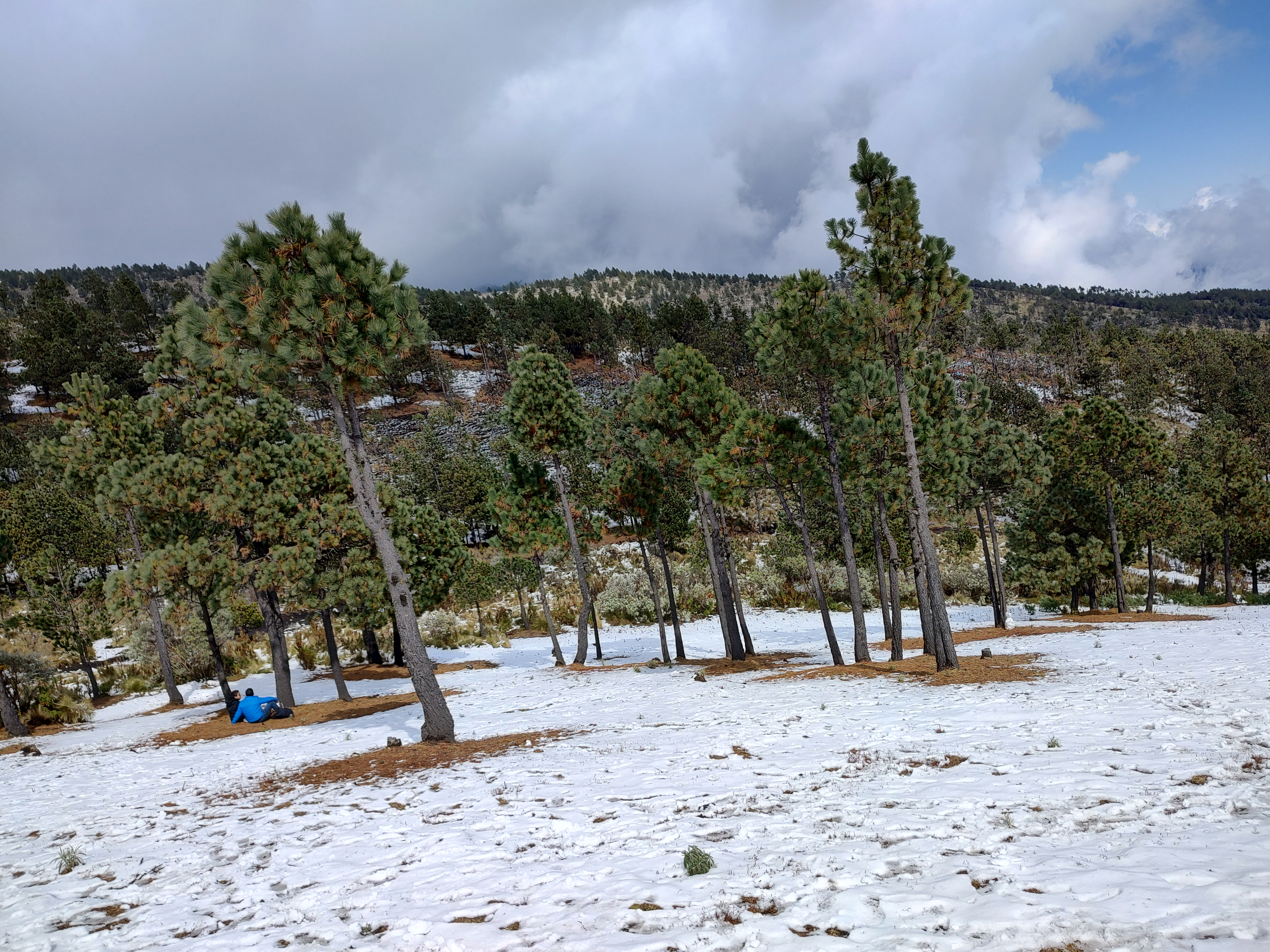
- View of Punta del Cielo

- Location in Veracruz La Perla, Veracruz (Mexico)
- Coordinates: 18°56′N 97°08′W
- Country: Mexico
- State: Veracruz
- Region: Mountains Region

Area
  - Total: 200 km^{2} (77 sq mi)
- Elevation: 2,280 m (7,480 ft)

Population (2020)
  - Total: 28,258
  - Seat: 4,627

La Perla is a city and municipality in the Mexican state of Veracruz. It is located in central zone of the State of Veracruz, about 75 km from Xalapa, the state capital. It has a surface of 199.880 km^{2}. It is located at 18°56′N 97°08′W.

== Geography ==
The municipality of La Perla is bordered to the north by Coscomatepec and Calcahualco to the east by Chocamán and Atzacan, to the south by Mariano Escobedo, Ixhuatlancillo, Maltrata and to the west by Puebla State.

The weather in La Perla is cold all year with rain in summer and autumn.

== Economy ==
Major crops are maize, beans, potatoes and faba bean.

== Culture ==
The celebration in honor of Our Lady of Guadalupe, patron of the town, is in December.

== History ==
As of March 3, 2021, sixteen confirmed cases and two deaths related to the COVID-19 pandemic in Mexico had been reported.

Melquiades Vázquez Lucas ("El Pantera"), candidate for mayor (PRI), was assassinated on March 4, 2021.
