= Saul Sanchez =

Saul Sanchez may refer to:

- Saúl Sánchez, Mexican football goalkeeper
- Saul Sanchez (boxer), American boxer
