= Fidel Kuri Grajales =

Mexican businessman and politician

- Born: 24 February 1962 (age 64); Orizaba, Veracruz, Mexico
- Occupations: Businessman and politician
- Political party: Institutional Revolutionary Party

Fidel Kuri Grajales (born 24 February 1962) is a Mexican businessman and politician from the Institutional Revolutionary Party (PRI). He served as a deputy to the LXIII Legislature of the Mexican Congress, representing Veracruz's 15th electoral district, which includes the city of Orizaba. He also served as a deputy in the LXI Legislature. He was the incumbent chairman of the Tiburones Rojos de Veracruz football club.

== Political and business career ==
Kuri Grajales was born on 24 February 1962 in Orizaba, Veracruz, and pursued an undergraduate degree in business administration, which he abandoned in 1981. He started his political career in the 1990s in the PRI, becoming president of a municipal committee. He also was involved in various transportation and other business chambers.

From 1998 to 2000, Kuri served on the LVIII Legislature of the Congress of Veracruz, presiding over the Public Works and Communications Commission and serving on the Territorial Limits and Civil Protection Commissions. During this time, he was a substitute deputy to the LVII Legislature. He would be a substitute local deputy to the LX Legislature of Veracruz; during this time, he was part of the PRI's Veracruz State Directive Committee and assisted in get out the vote efforts for PRI deputies in the lead-up to the 2006 general elections.

He also started a business career, becoming director general of Transmilenia, a construction company. In 2009, while Kuri was serving his first term as a federal deputy, his company was criticized for abandoning paving work on a highway in Nogales, Veracruz. A reputation for incomplete projects has continued to dog Transmilenia; one 2015 report called it the company's "hallmark".

In 2009, Kuri was elected to serve what would be the first of two terms in the federal Chamber of Deputies, representing Veracruz's 15th electoral district. During his first tour in San Lázaro, he sat on the Youth and Sports, Communications, Citizen Participation, Tourism and Gender Equality Commissions.

Three years after the end of the LXI Legislature, Kuri returned to the Chamber of Deputies, representing the same electoral district for the PRI. He sat on the Sports, Finances and Public Credit, and Housing Commissions of the Chamber of Deputies; he was the chairman of the former.

In 2017, Kuri Grajales launched a campaign to become mayor of the city of Veracruz.

== Sports ==
Kuri Grajales has owned several soccer teams. In 2008, he bought his local team, the Albinegros de Orizaba, who played in the Liga de Ascenso. In 2011, he transferred the franchise to the state government, which moved it to Veracruz as the Tiburones Rojos.

Kuri then bought the Reboceros de La Piedad, which earned promotion to the Liga MX in 2013. The team was relocated from Michoacán to Veracruz to become the most recent incarnation of the Tiburones Rojos, effectively promoting the Veracruz team. When they won the Copa MX in April 2016, Kuri allowed Héctor Yunes Landa, the PRI's candidate for governor, to hoist the cup. In 2015, Proceso reported that the deal to move to Veracruz had occurred by way of an indefinite contract, in which Governor Javier Duarte sold Kuri's company, Promotora Deportiva del Valle de Orizaba, A.C., the rights to the name, logo, stadium and practice facilities at no cost. This contract was never signed by the state congress and legally expired in January 2014, though Kuri continues to profit from the club's intellectual property.

The Mexican Football Federation suspended Kuri Grajales from all soccer-related activities in January 2016 and imposed a fine of 146,000 pesos for being involved in an altercation with the head of the referees, Edgardo Codesal. He had previously been fined in 2014 for criticism of referees. In September 2016, after a match in Puebla, Kuri, still banned by the FMF, entered the press area and confronted a local reporter, earning him an 8-month extension to his suspension. Journalists who witnessed the confrontation noted that Kuri was drunk.

In May 2016, Kuri Grajales became the center of controversy when he threatened to move the Tiburones Rojos if the PRI did not win the impending gubernatorial elections; Tamaulipas, Sinaloa and Yucatán were floated as potential landing pads for the franchise. These statements ran contrary to Article 7 of the Code of Ethics of the Mexican Football Federation, which require team owners to "maintain a neutral position in political and religious matters". One week later, Kuri changed his mind and announced that, even though the PRI had lost the election, the Tiburones Rojos would remain in Veracruz.

Kuri was additionally criticized during his Veracruz mayoral campaign for using the team as part of his campaign, including a logo featuring a shark, mixing team and campaign messages on his personal account, and the campaign slogan Veracruz de primera, which also refers to the team remaining in Liga MX.
