= Atzacan =

Municipality in Veracruz, Mexico

- City and municipality
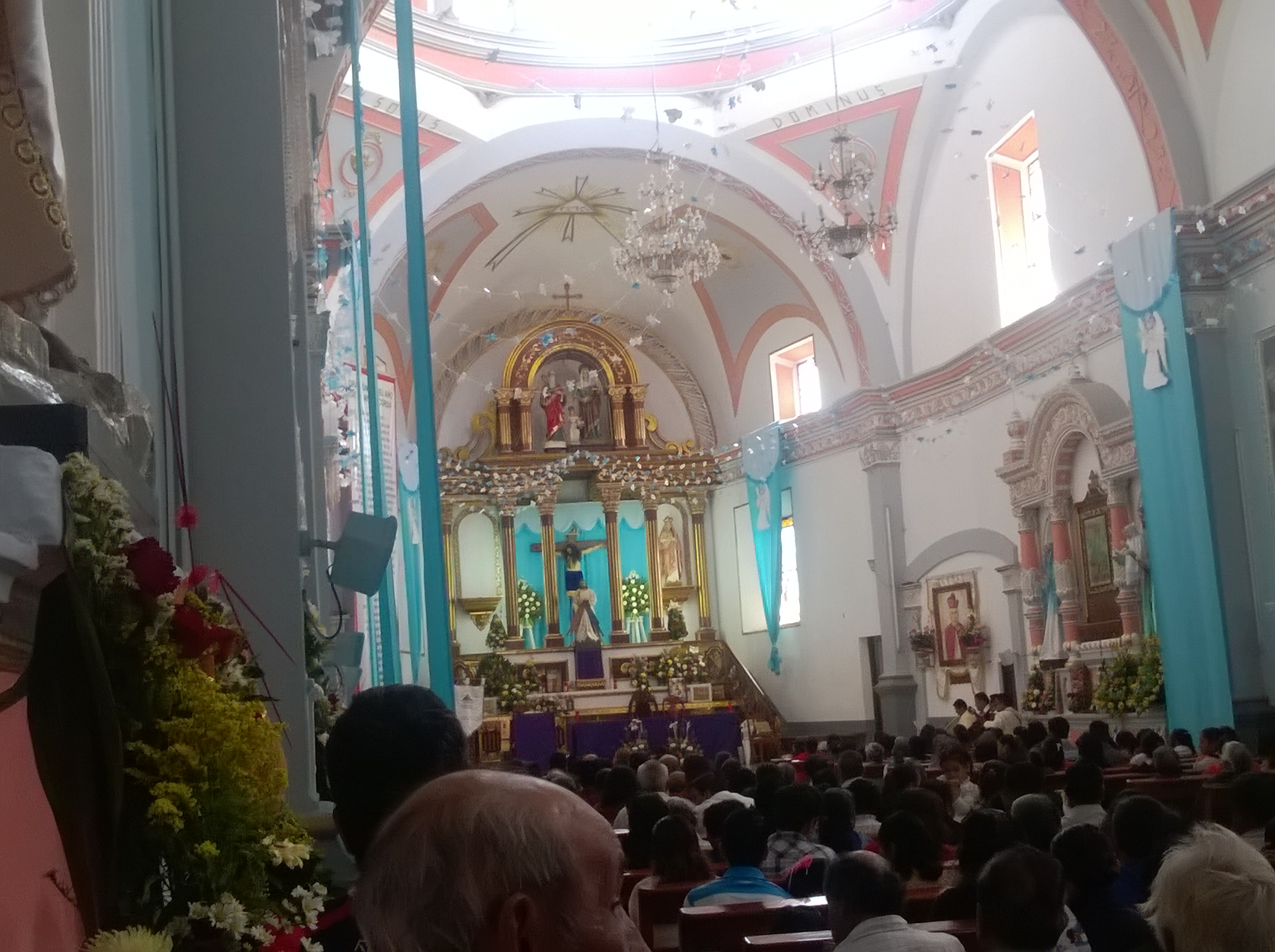
- Interior de la Parroquia de Santa Ana Atzacan

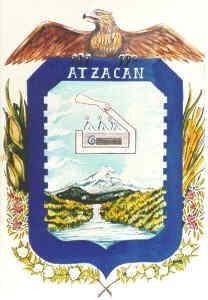
- Coat of arms

- Location in Veracruz Atzacan (Mexico)
- Country: Mexico
- State: Veracruz
- Elevation: 1,284 m (4,213 ft)

Population
  - Total: 10,146
- Time zone: UTC-6 (Central Standard Time)

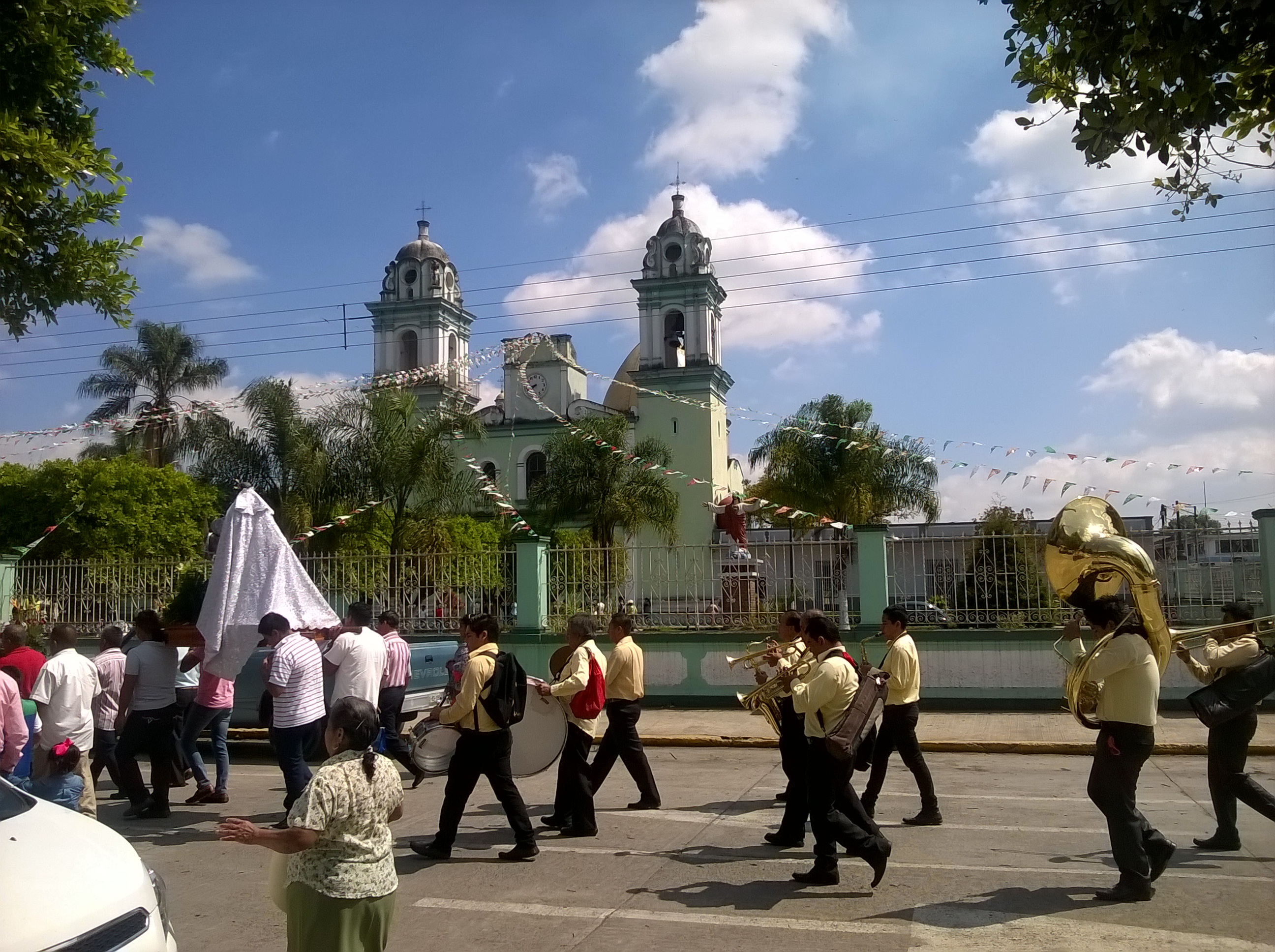
Traditions in the church of Santa Ana Atzacan

Atzacan is a municipality in the Mexican state of Veracruz. It is located about 198 km from state capital Xalapa. It has a surface of 80.61 km^{2}. It is located at 18°54′N 97°05′W.

The municipality of Atzacan is delimited to the north by Chocaman, to the east by Iztaczoquitlán, to the south by Orizaba, to the south-west by Mariano Escobedo, to the west by La Perla, to the north-west by Coscomatepec de Bravo.

It produces principally maize and beans.

A celebration in honor of Santa Ana, Patronress, takes place in April.

A large crowd attended the funeral of mayor Octavio Misael Lorenzo Morales on February 8, 2021, who died of COVID-19. As of this date, there have been 106 confirmed cases and ten deaths due to the virus in Atzacan. Few of the mourners practiced social distancing.
