= Gerardo Lagunes Gallina =

Mexican politician

- Born: 15 May 1975 (age 51); Orizaba, Veracruz, Mexico
- Occupation: Politician
- Political party: PRI

Gerardo Lagunes Gallina (born 15 May 1975) is a Mexican politician from the Institutional Revolutionary Party (PRI).

In the 2006 general election he was elected to the Chamber of Deputies to represent Veracruz's 15th congressional district during the 60th Congress (2006–2009). He had previously served as the municipal president of Nogales, Veracruz.
