= Ramón Arnaud =

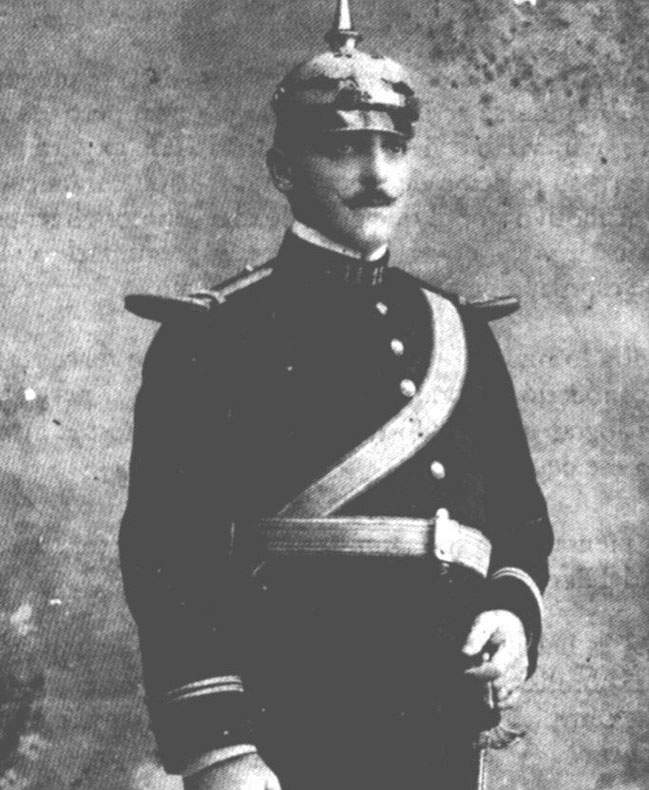
- Arnaud in 1908

Governor of Clipperton Island
- In office 1906–1915
- Preceded by: Position established
- Succeeded by: Position abolished

Personal details
- Born: Ramón Nonato Arnaud Vignon; 1879 Orizaba, Mexico
- Died: 29 May 1915 (aged 35–36) Off Clipperton Island
- Cause of death: Drowning
- Spouse: Alicia Rovira
- Occupation: Military officer

Military service
- Allegiance: Mexico
- Branch/service: Mexican Army
- Years of service: ?–1915
- Rank: Captain
- Battles/wars: Caste War of Yucatán

Ramón Nonato Arnaud Vignon (1879 – 29 May 1915) was an officer in the Mexican Army and the only Mexican governor of Clipperton Island.

== Early life ==
Ramón Arnaud was born in Orizaba, Veracruz, in 1879, to Ángel Arnaud and Carlota Vignon, Mexicans of French origin who had settled in Veracruz in the aftermath of the 1862–1867 French Intervention. He completed his primary education in Orizaba and, influenced by a friend of his, the son of General Bernardo Reyes, decided to enlist in the Army. He was unable to secure entry to the Military Academy in Mexico City but, assisted by the influence of General Reyes, enrolled as a sergeant in the 7th Cavalry Regiment. Shortly after enlisting, however, he deserted; he was promptly tracked down, arrested, sent to the military prison in Tlatelolco for 5½ months, and demoted to a private in the 23rd Infantry Battalion. In the space of three years, however, he had regained his earlier rank after fighting against Maya insurgents in the Caste War of Yucatán. Shortly after that, he was posted to Japan in the company of Colonel Abelardo Ávalos.

== Governor of Clipperton ==
Upon his return from East Asia, the government of President Porfirio Díaz placed him in charge of the military garrison on Clipperton Island, an atoll in the Pacific subject to a sovereignty dispute between Mexico and France. At first he was reluctant, believing that this amounted to an exile from Mexico, but Ávalos convinced him by telling him that Díaz had personally chosen him to protect Mexico's interests in the international conflict with France, and that the fact that he spoke English, French, and Spanish would assist him in protecting Mexico's sovereignty over the territory. He consequently accepted and arrived on Clipperton as governor in 1906.

By 1914, the situation on the island had turned difficult. With the outbreak of the Mexican Revolution and the overthrow of Victoriano Huerta, the Mexican supply ship that sailed between Clipperton and Acapulco had stopped coming. An American ship arrived, bringing provisions and rescuing a German, Gustav Schultz (the representative of the company which mined guano on Clipperton Island), who had lost his mind. The Americans also impressed upon Arnaud the seriousness of the problems which confronted Mexico (including the American occupation of Veracruz) and informed him of the outbreak of the First World War, advising him to abandon the island. Nevertheless, the captain and the rest of the soldiers decided to remain, staying faithful to their duty even though their homeland had forgotten them.

== Death ==
In 1915, an outbreak of scurvy claimed many of the colonists' lives and in 1915, by now desperate and at the head of a colony that had no food, Arnaud set sail with three soldiers in a canoe in pursuit of a passing ship they had spied. They were unable to reach the ship, however, and the canoe sank while returning, drowning all four of its occupants.
