= Tomás Antonio Trueba =

Mexican politician

- Born: 13 July 1954 (age 71); Veracruz, Mexico
- Occupation: Politician
- Political party: PAN

Tomás Antonio Trueba Gracián (born 13 July 1954) is a Mexican politician affiliated with the National Action Party (PAN). In the 2003 mid-terms he was elected to the Chamber of Deputies to represent the 15th district of Veracruz during the 59th Congress.
