= Tomatlán, Veracruz =

Tomatlán
- Municipality
- Location in Veracruz

- Location in Mexico
- Coordinates: 19°01′51″N 97°00′31″W
- Country: Mexico
- State: Veracruz
- Established: 18 January 1825
- Seat: Tomatlán

Government
  - President: Antonio Flores Cancino

Area
  - Total: 18.905 km^{2} (7.299 sq mi)
- Elevation (of seat): 1,355 m (4,446 ft)

Population (2010 Census)
  - Total: 6,763
  - Estimate (2015 Intercensal Survey): 6,869
  - Density: 357.7/km^{2} (926.5/sq mi)
  - Seat: 4,348
- Time zone: UTC-6 (Central)
- Postal codes: 94170–94178
- Area code: 273
- Website: Official website

Tomatlán (Nahuatl: "place of tomatoes") is a municipality in the Mexican state of Veracruz, located 58 kilometres (36 mi) south of the state capital of Xalapa.

== Geography ==
The municipality of Tomatlán is located in central Veracruz at an altitude between 1,000 and 1,500 metres (3,300–4,900 ft). It borders the municipalities of Ixhuatlán del Café to the northeast, Córdoba to the southeast, Chocamán to the southwest, and Coscomatepec de Bravo to the northwest. The municipality covers an area of 18.905 square kilometres (7.299 sq mi) and comprises 0.03% of the state's area.

Tomatlán is located in the Jamapa River basin. Agricultural land makes up 87.04% of the municipality's area.

Tomatlán's climate is humid and semi-warm with rain throughout the year. Average temperatures in the municipality range between 16 and 20 °C (61–68 °F), and average annual precipitation ranges between 1,500 and 2,000 millimetres (59–79 in).

== History ==
Located three kilometres (1.9 mi) east of the municipal seat of Tomatlán, the Olmec site of La Yerbabuena dates to the Middle and Late Formative periods (c. 600–400 BCE) and has been identified as a workshop for the production of obsidian tools. In the 15th century a Teochichimeca settlement called Quechultenango ("wall of quetzals") was founded in the area, which in the colonial period became known as San Miguel Quechultenango Tomatlán.

On 18 January 1825 Tomatlán was incorporated as a municipality in the state of Veracruz. It became a free municipality on 15 January 1918.

== Administration ==
The municipal government comprises a president, a councillor (Spanish: síndico), and a trustee (regidor). The current president of the municipality is Nicolas Prado Morales.

== Demographics ==
In the 2010 Mexican Census, the municipality of Tomatlán recorded a population of 6763 inhabitants living in 1749 households. The 2015 Intercensal Survey estimated a population of 6869 inhabitants in Tomatlán.

There are 10 localities in the municipality, of which only the municipal seat, also called Tomatlán, is classified as urban. It recorded a population of 4348 inhabitants in the 2010 Census.

== Economy ==
The most important economic activities in Tomatlán are sugarcane production and chicken farming, followed by coffee production and cattle farming.
