= Geofísica Internacional =

- Discipline: Geophysics, tectonics
- Language: English, Spanish
- Edited by: Servando de la Cruz Reyna

Publication details
- History: 1961–present
- Publisher: Instituto de Geofísica, National Autonomous University of Mexico (Mexico)
- Frequency: Quarterly
- Open access: Yes
- License: CC BY
- Impact factor: 0.826 (2018)

Standard abbreviations
- ISO 4: Geofís. Int.

Indexing
- CODEN: GFINAC
- ISSN: 0016-7169
- LCCN: sf83007075
- OCLC no.: 909882735

Links
- Journal homepage; Online archive

Geofísica Internacional is a quarterly peer-reviewed open-access scientific journal published by the Instituto de Geofísica of the National Autonomous University of Mexico. It covers all aspects of geophysics and tectonics pertaining to Latin America. It was established in 1961 and the editor-in-chief is Servando de la Cruz Reyna (National Autonomous University of Mexico).

== Abstracting and indexing ==
The journal is abstracted and indexed in Chemical Abstracts Service, GEOBASE, Science Citation Index Expanded, and Scopus. According to the Journal Citation Reports, the journal has a 2018 impact factor of 0.826.
