= Alpatláhuac =

- City and municipal seat
- Chapel of Our Lady of Guadalupe in Alpatláhuac

- Location in Veracruz
- Country: Mexico
- State: Veracruz
- Region: Mountains Region

Area
  - Total: 71 km^{2} (27 sq mi)

Population (2010)
  - Total: 9,691

Alpatlahuac is a municipality in the Mexican state of Veracruz. It is located about 161 km from the state capital Xalapa. It has a surface of 75.7 km^{2}. It is located at 19°07′N 97°06′W.

The municipality of Alpatlahuac is delimited to the south by Coscomatepec and to the north by the Calcahualco.

It produces maize and rice.
