= Saúl Sánchez =

Mexican footballer (born 1973)

Personal information
- Full name: Saúl Octavio Sánchez Graciano
- Date of birth: 3 April 1973 (age 53)
- Place of birth: Orizaba, Veracruz, Mexico
- Height: 1.90 m (6 ft 3 in)
- Position: Goalkeeper

Senior career*
| Years | Team | Apps | (Gls) |
| 1999–2000 | Club Leon | 29 | (0) |
| 2000–2001 | Puebla F.C. | 4 | (0) |
| 2001 | La Piedad | 11 | (0) |
| 2004 | Dorados de Sinaloa | 1 | (0) |
| 2005–2006 | Lagartos de Tabasco | 15 | (0) |
| 2006 | Gallos Caliente | 11 | (0) |
| 2007 | Club Celaya | 3 | (0) |
| 2007 | Querétaro FC | 3 | (0) |
| 2008 | Real Colima | 2 | (0) |
| 2009–2011 | Mérida F.C. | 22 | (0) |
| 2011–2012 | Estudiantes de Altamira | 1 | (0) |
- * Club domestic league appearances and goals as of May 29, 2009

Saúl Octavio Sánchez Graciano (born April 3, 1973) is a football goalkeeper. He last played for the club Estudiantes de Altamira, in the Mexican Liga de Ascenso.

== Club career ==
Sánchez played in numerous clubs throughout his career in México, including Puebla F.C., La Piedad, Dorados de Sinaloa, Lagartos de Tabasco, Club Tijuana, Club Celaya, Querétaro FC and Real Colima.

After a brief retirement in 2007, he returned to play and help Mérida to attempt to be promoted to Primera División de México.
