= Ixhuatlancillo =

Municipality in Mexico

- Municipality
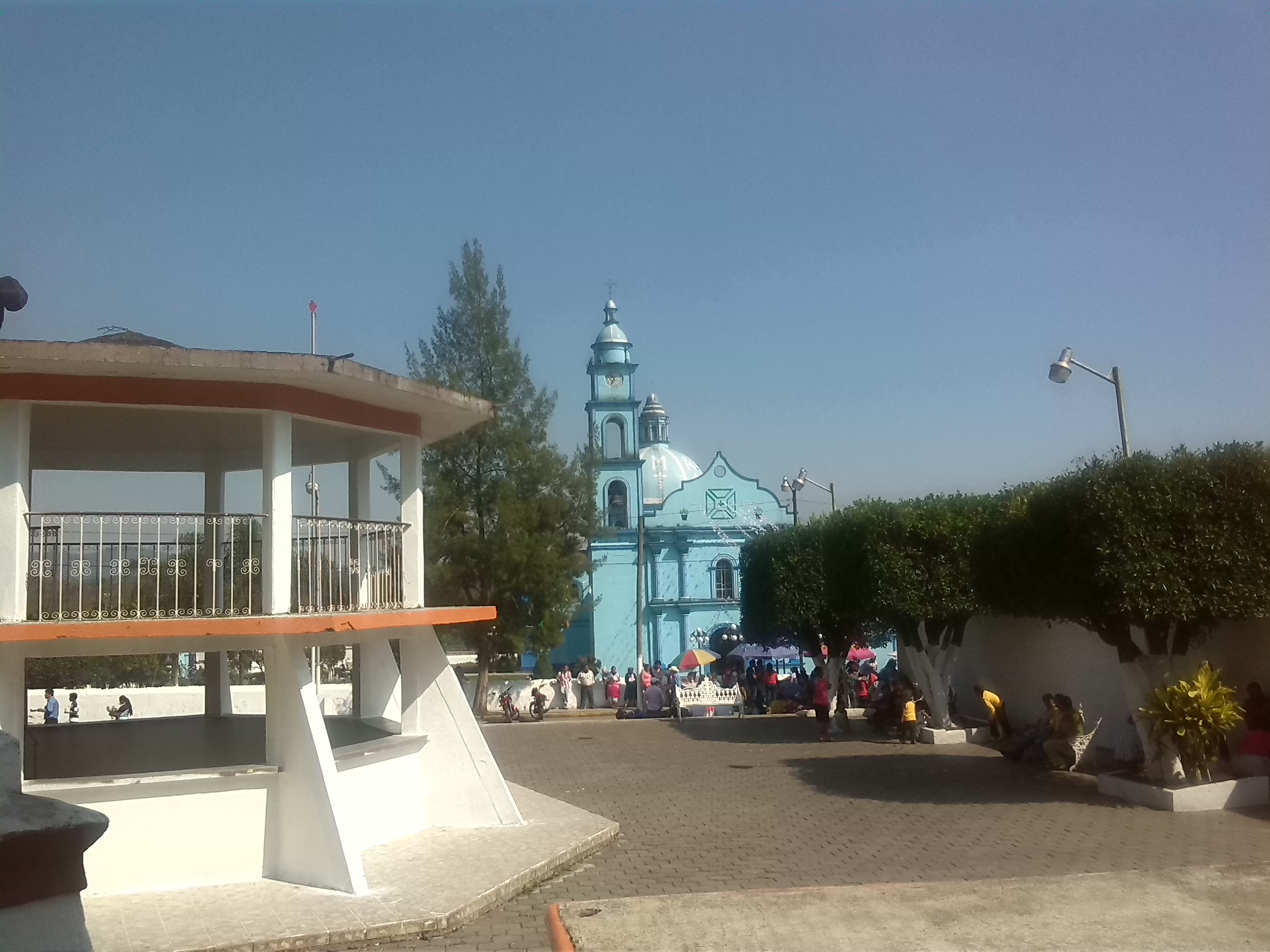
- Zócalo de Ixhuatlancillo.

- Location in Mexico Ixhuatlancillo (Mexico)
- Country: Mexico
- State: Veracruz

Government

Area
  - Municipality: 39.5 km^{2} (15.3 sq mi)
- Demonym: (in Spanish)
- Time zone: UTC−6 (CST)

Ixhuatlancillo is a municipality in the central zone of the Mexican state of Veracruz, about 165 km from Xalapa, the state capital. It has a surface of 39.48 km^{2} and is located at 18°54′N 97°09′W.

== Geography ==
The municipality of Ixhuatlancillo is delimited to the north by La Perla, to the east by Mariano Escobedo, to the south by Orizaba, Río Blanco and Nogales and to the west by Maltrata.

The weather in Ixhuatlancillo is cool all year with rains in summer and autumn.

== Economy ==
It produces principally maize, coffee and sugarcane.

== Culture ==
On February 2, each year, there is a celebration in honor of Virgen de la Candelaria, patron of the town.
