= Orizaba =

Coordinates: 18°51′N 97°06′W

- Municipality and town
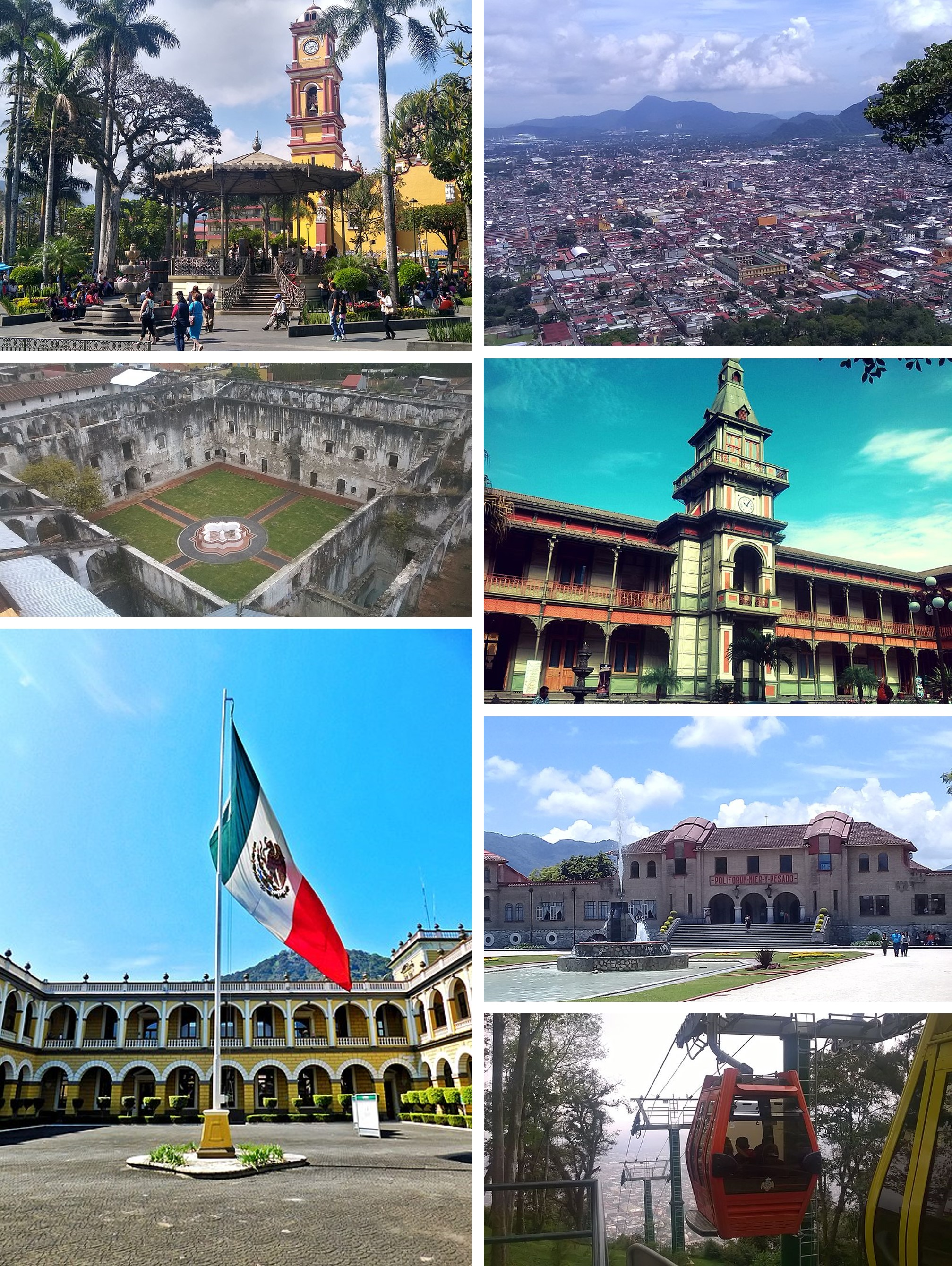
- Clockwise, from upper left: San Miguel de Arcángel Cathedral, Panoramic of the city from El Borrego Hill, San José de Gracia Convent, Palacio de Hierro, Orizaba City Hall, Mier y Pesado Polyforum, Orizaba cableway

- Coat of arms

- In Veracruz
- Country: Mexico
- State: Veracruz
- Region: Mountains Region
- Municipality: Orizaba

Government
  - Mayor: Hugo Chahín Kuri (PRI)

Area
  - Total: 27.9 km^{2} (10.8 sq mi)
- Elevation: 1,235 m (4,052 ft)

Population (2020)
  - Total: 123,182
  - Density: 4,416.7/km^{2} (11,439/sq mi)
  - Seat: 120,500
  - Metro: 462,221
- Time zone: UTC−6 (Central Standard Time)

Orizaba (Spanish: [oɾiˈsaβa], Nahuatl: Ahuilizapan, Otomi: Mbo'ñu) is a city and municipality in the Mexican state of Veracruz. It is located 20 km west of its sister city Córdoba, and is adjacent to Río Blanco and Ixtaczoquitlán, on Federal Highways 180 and 190. The city had a 2020 census population of 120,500 and is almost coextensive with its small municipality, with only a few small areas outside the city. The municipality, with an area of 27.97 km^{2} (10.799 sq mi), had a population of 123,182. While the metropolitan area of Orizaba has a population of 462,261 as 2020.

In 2015, Orizaba earned the designation of Pueblo Mágico from Mexico's federal government and celebrated the 10-year anniversary of this designation in October of 2025. The Pueblo Mágico program grants this designation to towns that offer visitors "cultural richness, historical relevance, cuisine, art crafts, and great hospitality."

In the town of Ixhuatlancillo north of Orizaba, and in a large mountainous area to the south (the Sierra de Zongolica), live many thousands of people who speak a variant of Nahuatl which is often called Orizaba Nahuatl (ISO code nlv).

== Naming ==
It is generally understood that the name Orizaba comes from a Hispanicized pronunciation of the Nahuatl name Āhuilizāpan [a: wi li sa: pan], which means "place of pleasing waters." Another possibility, however, is the word Harish (Jerez de la Frontera, Andalusia, in 16th-century Spanish pronunciation), this place being the hometown of the first Spanish settlers (1521) of Orizaba. Harish or—in a simplified form—Ariz, with the addition (under the influence of the Arabic language) of the gentilic "i" and/or with the ending "aba", meaning fortification, would have become Ariziba or Arizaba, from which Orizaba would have derived. (The word Harish—in turn—is, according to some authors, linked to the capital of Tartessus and could refer to the biblical Tarshish. Its Semitic meaning could be "trading post" or "foundry site", since Tartessus was a major Phoenician center of tin commerce and bronze production.)

== Geography ==
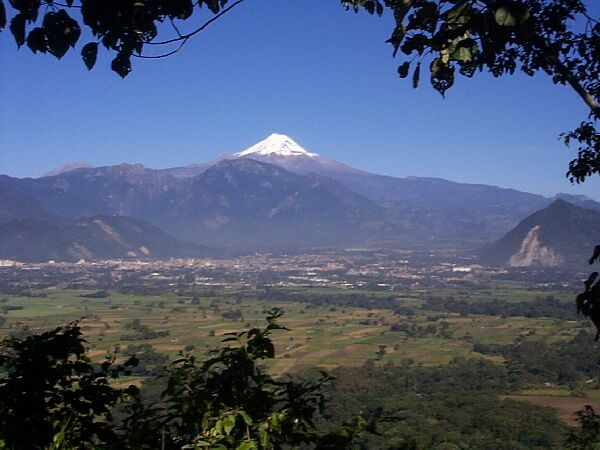
The Orizaba Valley Looking north, Orizaba in the middle distance, the Pico de Orizaba on the horizon

The town lies at 1,200 m. (4000 ft.), at the confluence of the Río Blanco with several tributaries, including the Río Orizaba, near the mouth of a large valley heading westward into the eastern Sierra Madre Oriental. This location, at the bottom of the ascent into the mountains, is an important transition point along what has been for centuries the main trade route between Mexico City and Veracruz on the Gulf Coast. in 1938 the upper Río Blanco watershed was designated Cañón del Río Blanco National Park.

Orizaba has an unusually wet dry-winter subtropical highland climate (Köppen climate classification: Cwb).

The climate is generally pleasant, though often cloudy and rainy, and the soil of the Orizaba valley is extraordinarily fertile. Overlooking the valley from the north is the Pico de Orizaba (Citlaltépetl), a volcano that, at 5,636 m. (18,490 ft.), is the highest mountain in Mexico and third highest in North America.

Climate data for Orizaba (1981–2000)
Month	Jan	Feb	Mar	Apr	May	Jun	Jul	Aug	Sep	Oct	Nov	Dec	Year
Record high °C (°F)	33.6 (92.5)	33.2 (91.8)	36.2 (97.2)	37.3 (99.1)	38.4 (101.1)	35.2 (95.4)	30.0 (86.0)	29.6 (85.3)	31.0 (87.8)	31.0 (87.8)	33.4 (92.1)	30.0 (86.0)	38.4 (101.1)
Mean daily maximum °C (°F)	21.0 (69.8)	22.2 (72.0)	24.1 (75.4)	26.5 (79.7)	27.4 (81.3)	26.4 (79.5)	25.1 (77.2)	25.5 (77.9)	25.2 (77.4)	23.6 (74.5)	23.0 (73.4)	21.3 (70.3)	24.3 (75.7)
Daily mean °C (°F)	14.8 (58.6)	15.9 (60.6)	17.4 (63.3)	19.5 (67.1)	20.9 (69.6)	20.8 (69.4)	19.6 (67.3)	19.8 (67.6)	20.1 (68.2)	18.4 (65.1)	17.1 (62.8)	15.7 (60.3)	18.3 (64.9)
Mean daily minimum °C (°F)	8.5 (47.3)	9.5 (49.1)	10.7 (51.3)	12.6 (54.7)	14.3 (57.7)	15.1 (59.2)	14.2 (57.6)	14.1 (57.4)	15.0 (59.0)	13.3 (55.9)	11.3 (52.3)	10.1 (50.2)	12.4 (54.3)
Record low °C (°F)	−1.0 (30.2)	0.5 (32.9)	1.0 (33.8)	3.2 (37.8)	6.5 (43.7)	8.8 (47.8)	8.5 (47.3)	6.4 (43.5)	1.2 (34.2)	1.3 (34.3)	1.0 (33.8)	0.2 (32.4)	−1.0 (30.2)
Average precipitation mm (inches)	33.1 (1.30)	44.2 (1.74)	36.0 (1.42)	57.3 (2.26)	92.8 (3.65)	360.0 (14.17)	422.2 (16.62)	397.6 (15.65)	426.9 (16.81)	200.0 (7.87)	69.0 (2.72)	54.1 (2.13)	2,193.3 (86.35)
Average precipitation days (≥ 0.1 mm)	11.1	11.0	9.6	10.7	11.0	23.7	26.4	26.5	25.5	20.6	11.4	12.5	200.0
Average relative humidity (%)	79	76	73	72	74	78	81	80	82	82	80	81	78
Mean monthly sunshine hours	135	125	143	147	136	122	119	137	102	114	130	128	1,539
Source: Servicio Meteorológico Nacional

== History ==
=== Prehistory and conquest ===
Orizaba was already an important town at the time of the Spanish conquest, and it was in Orizaba that La Malinche, Hernán Cortés's interpreter and mistress, was married to the Spanish gentleman Juan Jaramillo. A plaque at the Temple of "The Immaculate Conception" in Huiloapan commemorates this event.

=== Colonial period ===
During the colonial period, Orizaba became an important city. On January 27, 1774, the Spanish king Carlos III granted town (villa) status to Orizaba, and on November 29, 1830 Orizaba was declared a city.

=== Independence war ===
In October 1812, José María Morelos captured the city for the insurgent army. In 1821 to the end of the war, Agustín de Iturbide was in Orizaba before and after the signing of the Treaty of Córdoba in the neighbor city.

=== Independent period ===
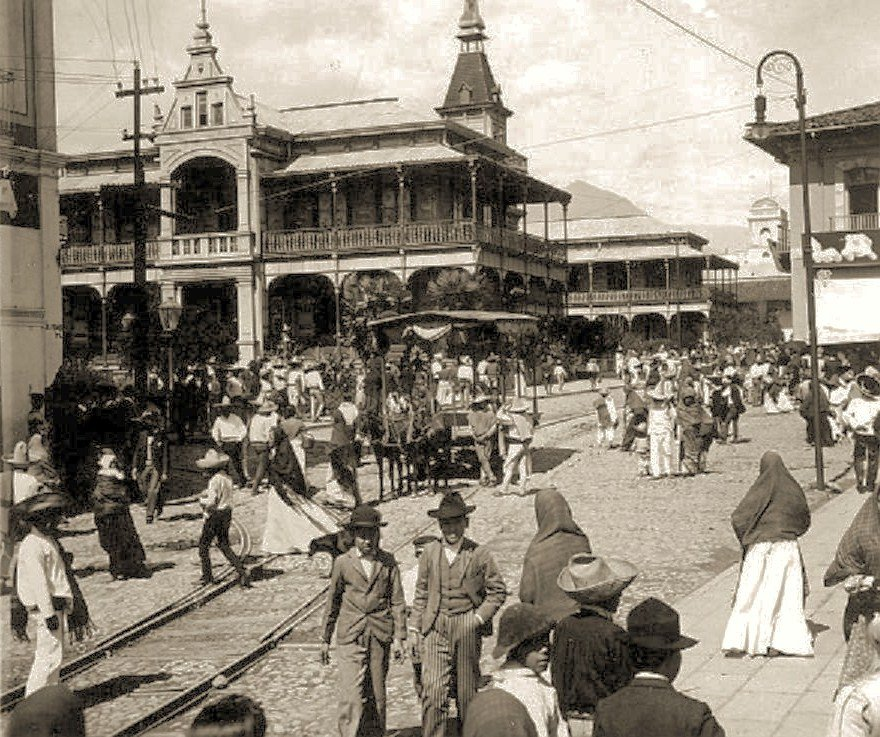
Orizaba during the Porfiriato

When Lucas Alamán established, in 1836, the first textile factory (Cocolapan) of Orizaba, the city started its economic life as an industrial city.

In 1839, the newspaper La Luz was created and Veracruz Governor Francisco Hernández y Hernández gave the name of Veracruz-Llave (remembering General Ignacio de la Llave, who was born in Orizaba) to the state.

On May 8, 1874, Orizaba was declared the capital city of Veracruz by Governor Apolinar Castillo, but in 1878 the status was transferred to Xalapa.

During the rule of Porfirio Díaz, Orizaba was declared the most educated city in the country.

In the late years of Díaz's government, there was an important workers' strike in Cananea. Another important strike, in Río Blanco, took place in Orizaba and was an important prelude to the Mexican Revolution.

The US transport ship USS Orizaba (ID-1536), active in both World Wars, was named after the city.

== Demographics ==
Historical population
Year	Pop.	±%
1995	114,425	—
2000	118,593	+3.6%
2005	117,289	−1.1%
2010	120,995	+3.2%
2015	126,005	+4.1%
2020	123,182	−2.2%

With a population of 123,182 inhabitants in the municipality as 2020, Orizaba is the seventh biggest municipality in Veracruz. There are 5 localities, Orizaba City, the municipal seat, and Villas de la Hacienda are classified as urban. Orizaba City contains more than 97 % of the municipal population (120,500 hab,), meanwhile Villas de la Haciendad recorded a population of 2,597 hab. The other three localities: Venustiano Carranza (61 hab.), Vicente Guerrero (18 hab.) and El Vaquero (6 hab.) are classified as rural. 4,452 inhabitants in Orizaba are classified as living in indigenous homes, 1,883 of which speakes an indigenous language.

Orizaba is the seat of a metropolitan area, with another 11 municipalities: Atzacan, Camerino Z. Mendoza, Huiloapan de Cuauhtémoc, Ixhuatlancillo, Ixtaczoquitlán, Maltrata, Mariano Escobedo, Nogales, Rafael Delgado, Río Blanco and Tlilapan. The metro area recorded a population of 462,221 inhabitants as 2020, the fourth largest metro area in the state.

== Economy ==
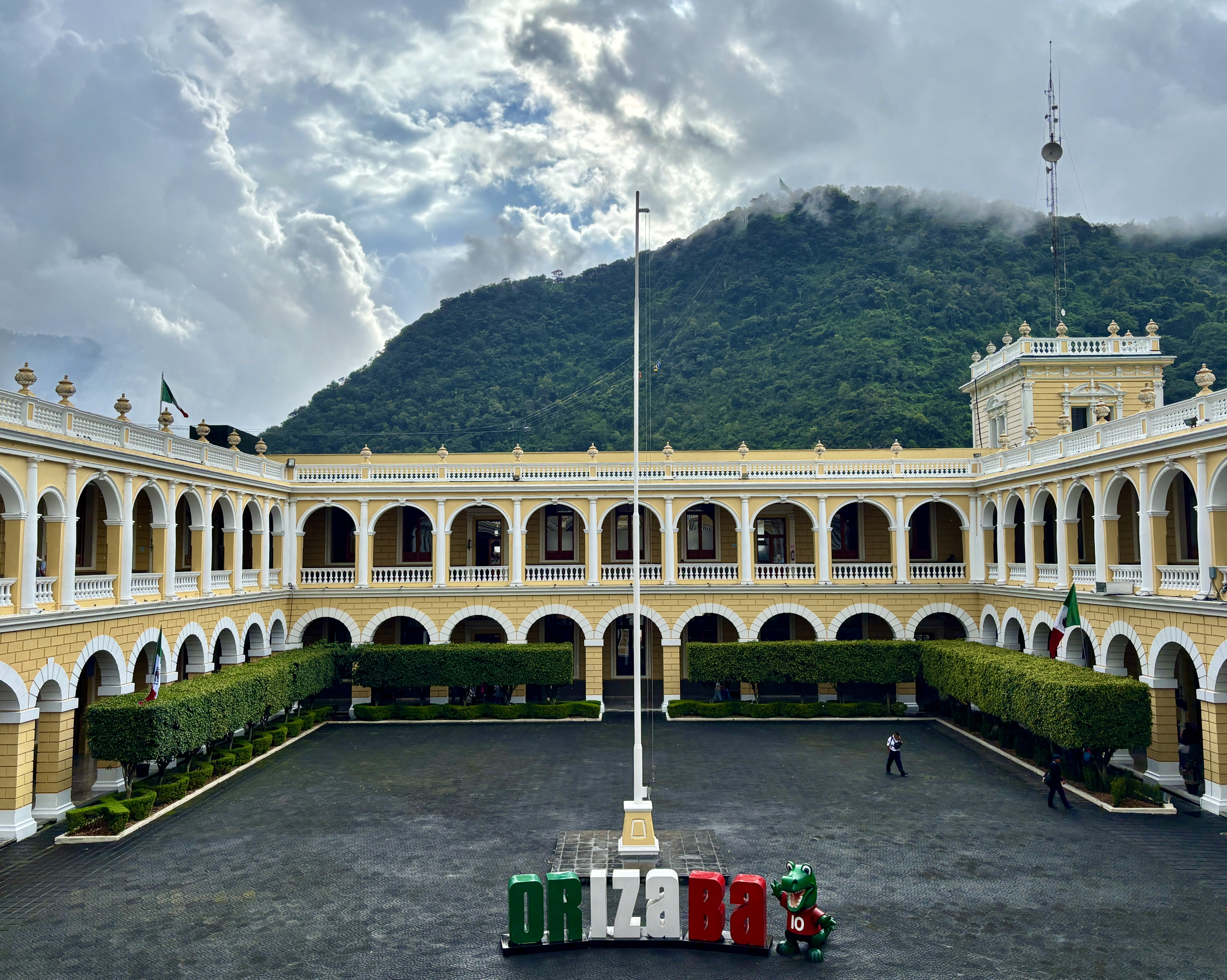
Palacio Municipal de Orizaba in 2025

The Orizaba's area (including the municipalities of Ixtaczoquitlán, Río Blanco, Nogales and Cd. Mendoza) economy has grown significantly in the last years due to the safety of the area, being of great confidence for national and foreign investors who wants to establish in a safe place. Another important reason is the presence of recognised Universities like Universidad Veracruzana, Instituto Tecnológico de Orizaba or Instituto Tecnológico y de Estudios Superiores de Monterrey Campus Central de Veracruz en Córdoba. The industry is mainly focused in the following areas: breweries, paper, cement, pharmaceutical, iron and steel sector, soft drinks and food, leather and shoemaker companies among others. Also in the last years the commercial area experiments a significant growth due to the opening of new Malls & Major Retailers. It is one of the cheapest cities to live and invest in México, as Mercer consultory published in the "Estudio de costo de la vida nacional 2012"; this study includes 42 localities of México, and was done comparing 182 products and services.

The inquiry also disclose that Orizaba's Valley will grow 10% in 2013, due to the lack of pollution, existence of enough water and other points like price of housing.

== Main sights ==
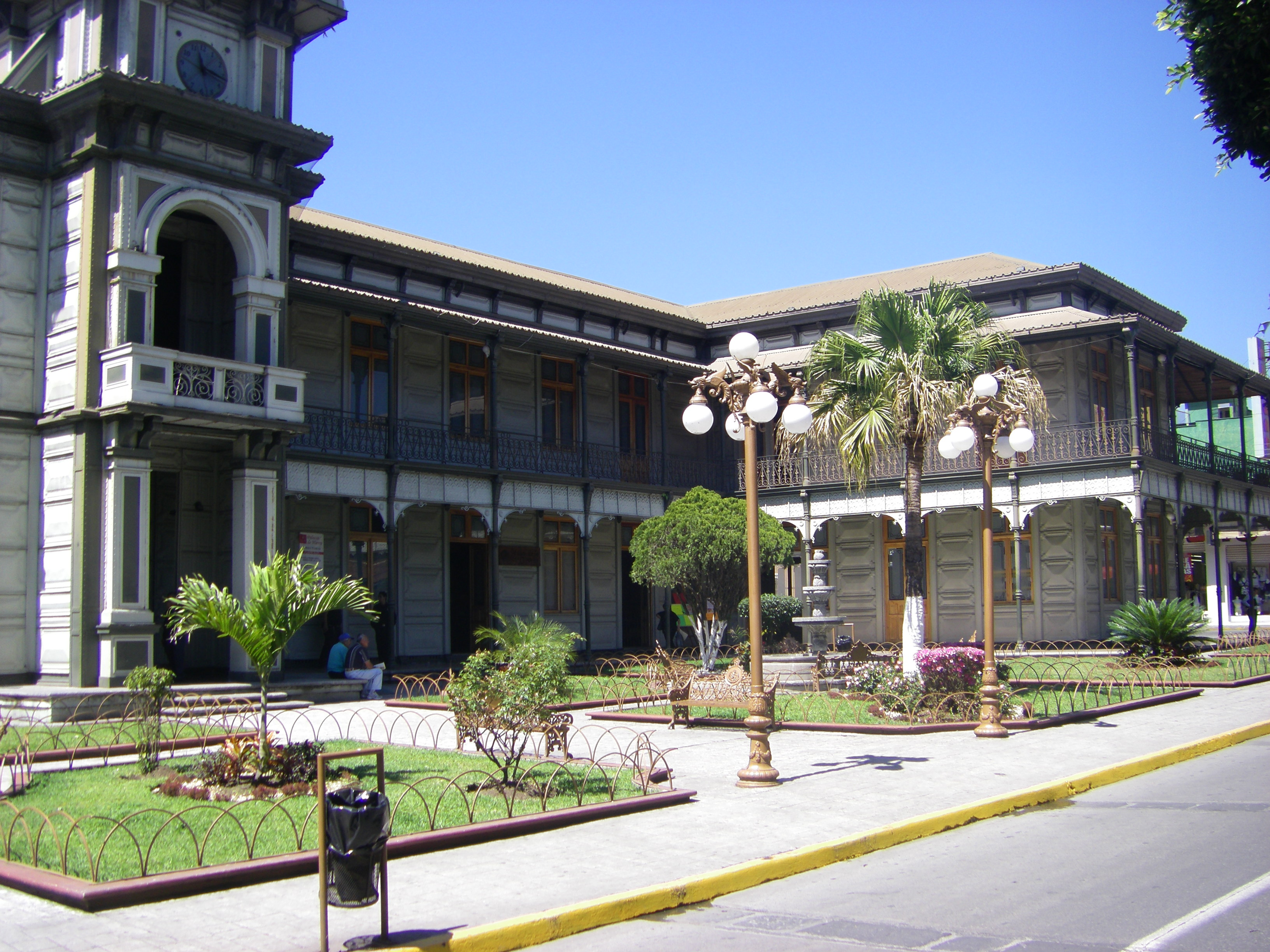
The Art Nouveau Palacio de Hierro

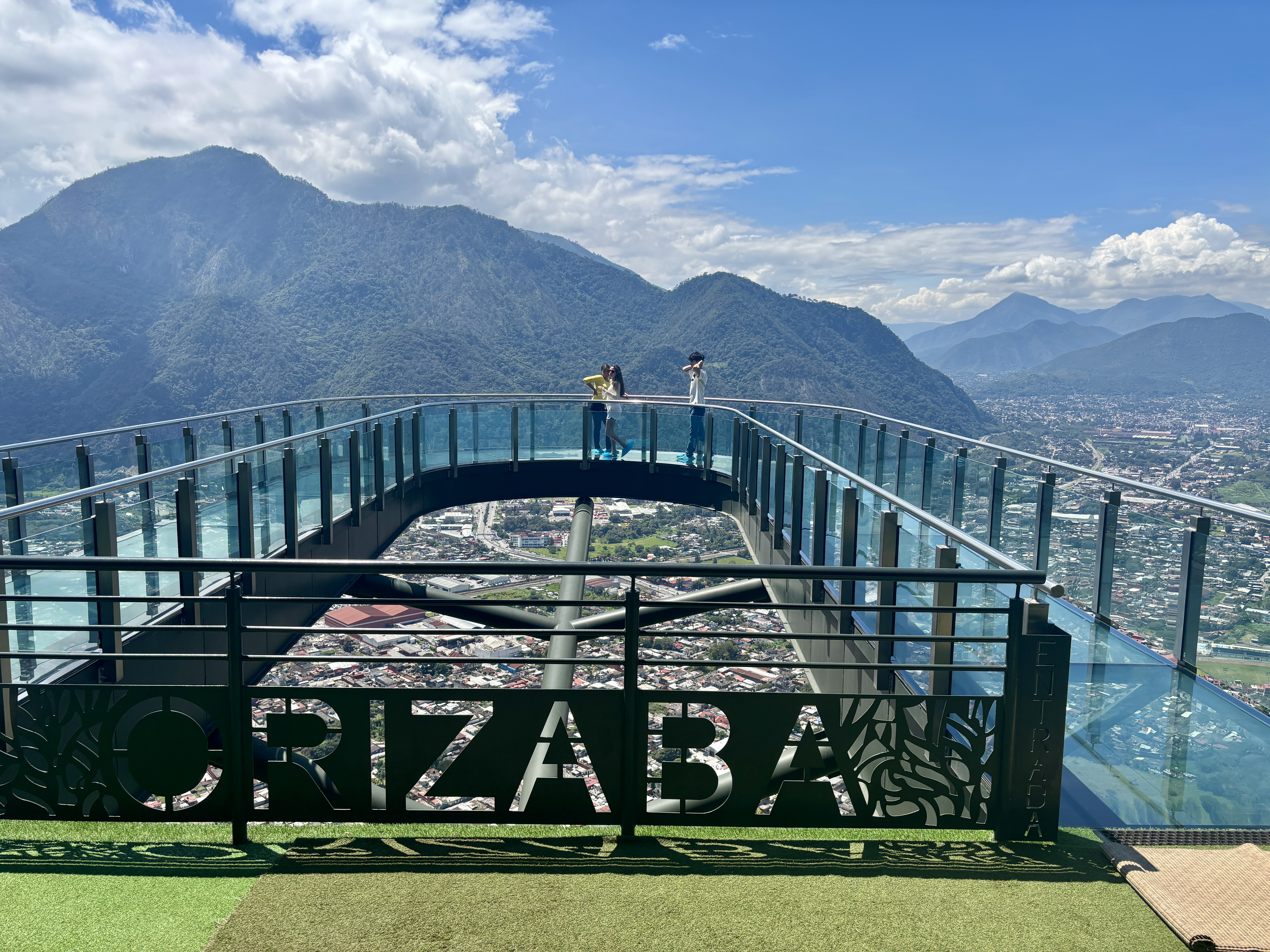
The Atalaya de Cristal, located in Orizaba's Ecoparque Cerro del Borrego, hovers 312 meters (1023 feet) above the valley floor.

The old city hall El Palacio de Hierro (The Iron Palace) in the centre of the city was designed by Gustave Eiffel and built from 1891 to 1894. Built with 600 tons of steel, its parts were shipped from Belgium during the Porfiriato (the government of Porfirio Díaz, 1876–1911), to be assembled in Orizaba. The palace cost 100,000 pesos (gold), equivalent to about 21.3 million pesos or 1.1 million USD as of 2019. Don Manuel Carrillo Tablas loaned the money to the city, and had to pay the additional cost of unloading the palace from the port and having it reassembled at its present location, the Plaza de Armas. Don Manuel died on New Year's Eve, 1899 without having received any repayment from the city for his loan. He had also donated the land where the present Cathedral of Orizaba and the adjacent "El Mercado" shopping center stand. El Palacio de Hierro served as the City Hall until the city considered that it was not large enough for the growing needs of the local government, and moved to its present location.

Orizaba has an important industrial life. There is, for example, the Cervecería Cuauhtémoc Moctezuma, a brewery established in 1896 in Orizaba.

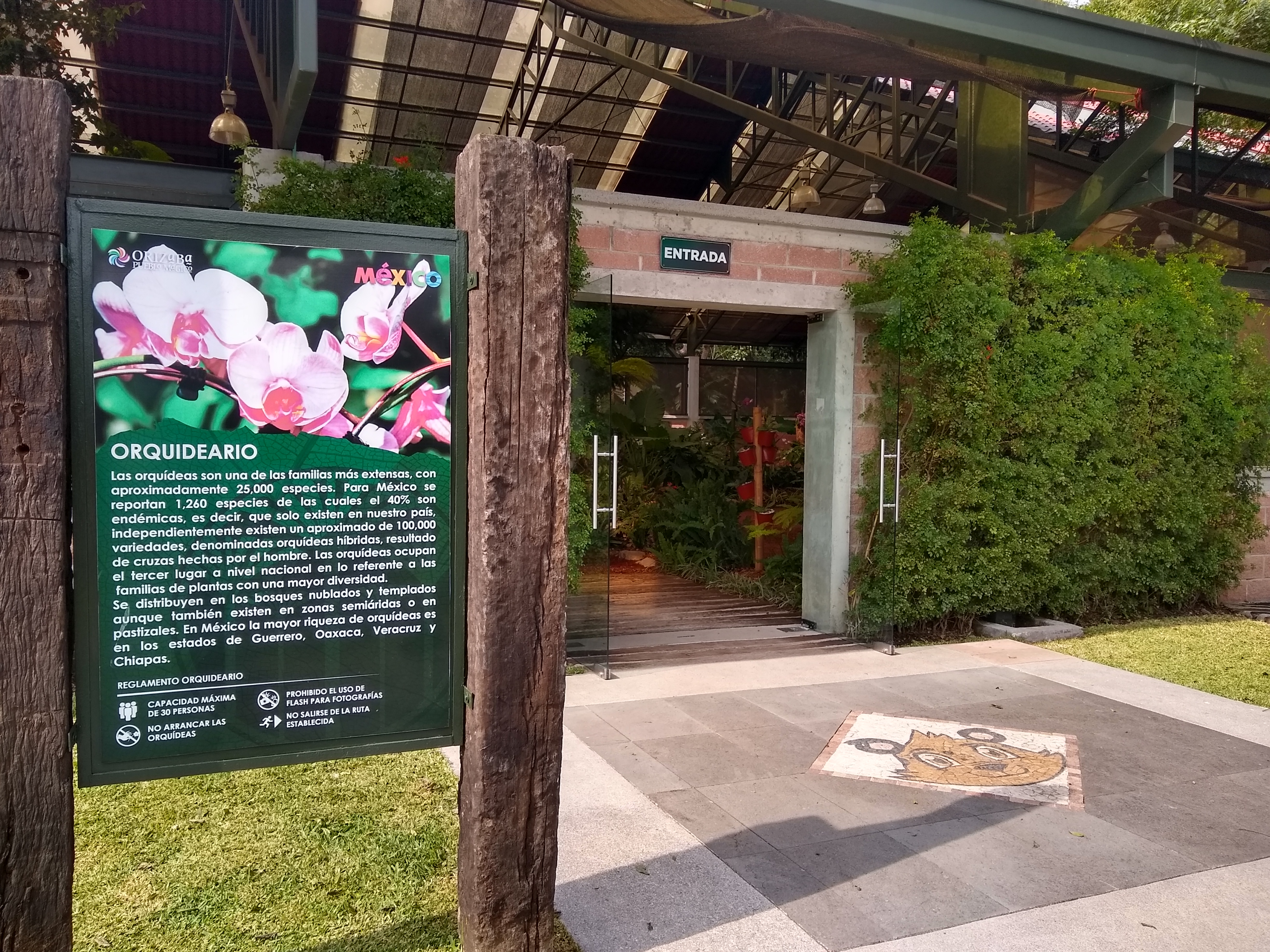
The Orchid House at BIORI Jardin Botanico de Orizaba

Other attractions for visitors include:

- The Teleférico or cable-car to the top of Cerro Borrego, which offers views of Pico de Orizaba. A trail to the top of Cerro Borrego is also available. In either case the mountain is most visible in the morning when the eastern sun lights it.
- Río Orizaba, a river that flows through the city, is home to Eco Parque Río which has many wild and domesticated animals that can be seen during a walk along its course. A trail known as the Riverwalk has been built along it.
- The BIORI Jardín Botánico de Orizaba or Orizaba Botanical Gardens has a variety of plants and outdoor art as well as an entire building devoted to growing orchids.

== Monuments and buildings ==
- The Iron Palace
- El Palacio Municipal (The City Hall)
- The Church of Nuestra Señora Del Carmen
- The Church of La Concordia
- State Art Museum
- Artisan market (Mercado de Artesanías)
- Mercado Cerritos, NW Orizaba and Mercado Melchor Ocampo, centro.
- Centro Orizaba park (Parque Castillo) and the Theater there has almost nightly free plays or music.
- Huge Rock in the Panteon (municipal cemetery).

== Notable Orizabeños (people from Orizaba) ==
- Sara García
- Ignacio de la Llave
- Salvador Moreno Manzano (1916-1999), composer, art historian and painter
- Saúl Sánchez
- Alfredo "El Viejo" Sánchez García
- Francisco Gabilondo Soler
- José Antonio Gómez Rosas
- Humberto Vélez
- Evita Muñoz a.k.a."Chachita"
- Ramón Arnaud
- Mauricio Kuri
- Gilberto Loyo
- Angelica Chain, actress

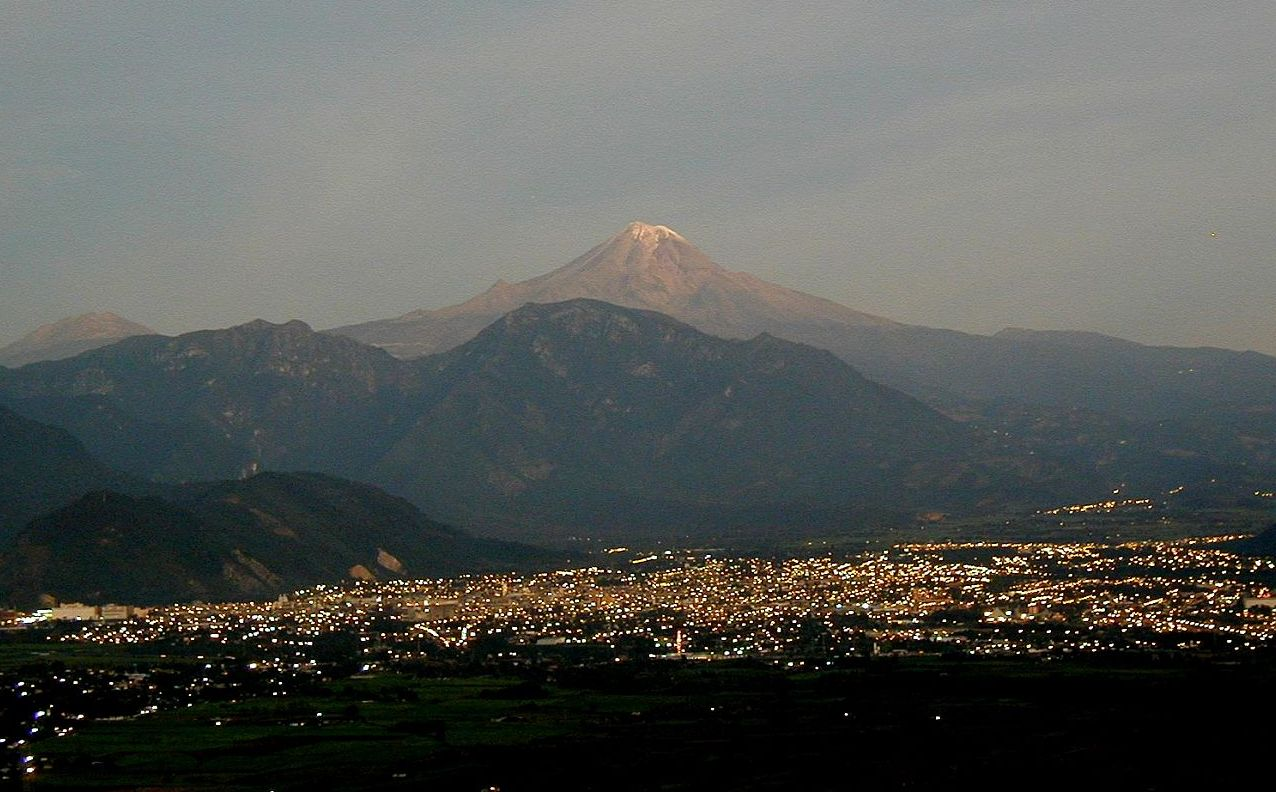
Orizaba before dawn

== See also ==
- Córdoba, Veracruz
- Mountains Region, Veracruz
- Orizaba Peak
- Sierra Madre Oriental
- Veracruz
