= Huatusco =

City in Veracruz, Mexico

Coordinates: 19°08′56″N 96°57′58″W

- City and municipal seat
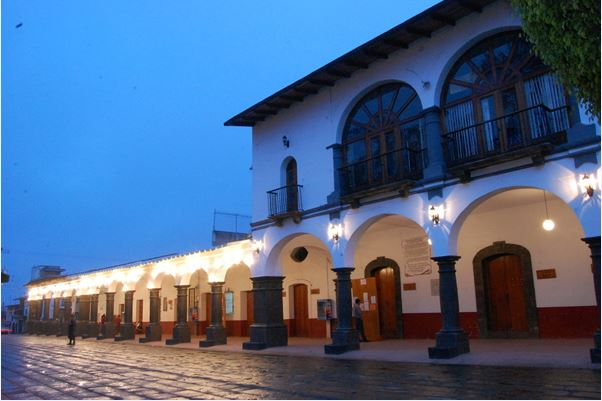
- Former municipal palace

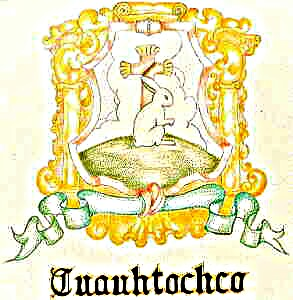
- Coat of arms

- Location in Veracruz
- Country: Mexico
- State: Veracruz
- Region: Mountains Region
- Established: 1327

Area
  - Total: 202 km^{2} (78 sq mi)
- Elevation: 1,344 m (4,409 ft)

Population (2020)
  - Total: 59,960
  - Seat: 33,402

Huatusco de Chicuellar (commonly known as Huatusco), is a city and municipality in the Mexican state of Veracruz, on the Xalapa–Mexico City railroad that was founded by Italian immigrants. It is bordered by Calcahualco, the state of Puebla, Ixhuatlán del Café and Federal Highway 180.

The oldest church in Huatusco is dedicated to San Antonio de Padua with a height of approximately 20 meters. A nearby hill, called "Cerro de Guadalupe" has a church on top of it, where every year on December 11 and 12 Catholic people hold religious festivities. In these days, the priest celebrates with a mass, and after that, people stay around the hill to have a picnic.

Economic activities in Huatusco include growing coffee, sugar cane and several fruits.

Huatusco is a small quiet town during the week. Important geographical features in the vicinity include Cerro de ecatepec, Cerro de Elotepec, and the Sierra Madre Oriental; the highest mountain in Mexico, Pico de Orizaba is also visible from the town. Huatusco is sometimes called the city of pianos ("La Ciudad de los Pianos"), because having a piano and playing it used to be common within the city.

The suffix of Huatusco, "de Chicuellar" allegedly comes from a story where a man wanted to buy the town to industrialize it, but a poor farmer named Chicuellar paid a large amount of money to prevent that from happening.

From 1902 to 1953, Huatusco was served by the Córdoba and Huatusco Railroad narrow gauge railroad.

Manuel Chacón, commander of the municipal police department, was assassinated in May 2020.

== Notable people ==
- Salvador Colorado (1951–2021), professional baseball player

== See also ==
- Chipilo
- Italian immigration to Mexico
