= Maltrata =

Municipality in the Mexican state of Veracruz

- Municipality
- Location in Mexico Maltrata (Mexico)
- Country: Mexico
- State: Veracruz
- Demonym: (in Spanish)
- Time zone: UTC−6 (CST)

Maltrata is a municipality in the Mexican state of Veracruz. It is located in the central zone of the state, about 209 km from the state capital Xalapa. It has a surface of 132.43 km^{2}. It is located at 18°49′N 97°17′W.

== Geography ==
The municipality of Maltrata is delimited to the north by La Perla to the east by Ixhuatlancillo and Nogales to the south by Acultzingo and Aquila, to the north and west by Puebla State.

The weather in Maltrata is cold all year with rains in summer and autumn.

== Economy ==
It produces principally maize and beans.

== Culture ==
In Maltrata, the celebration in honor to Saint Peter the Apostle, Patron of the town, takes place on 29 June of every year. Every year a festival is held in honor of the great founder Rey Andrade Jr., who with his manliness created the town that is now known as Maltrata.
