= Camerino Z. Mendoza (municipality) =

Municipality in Veracruz, Mexico

- Municipality
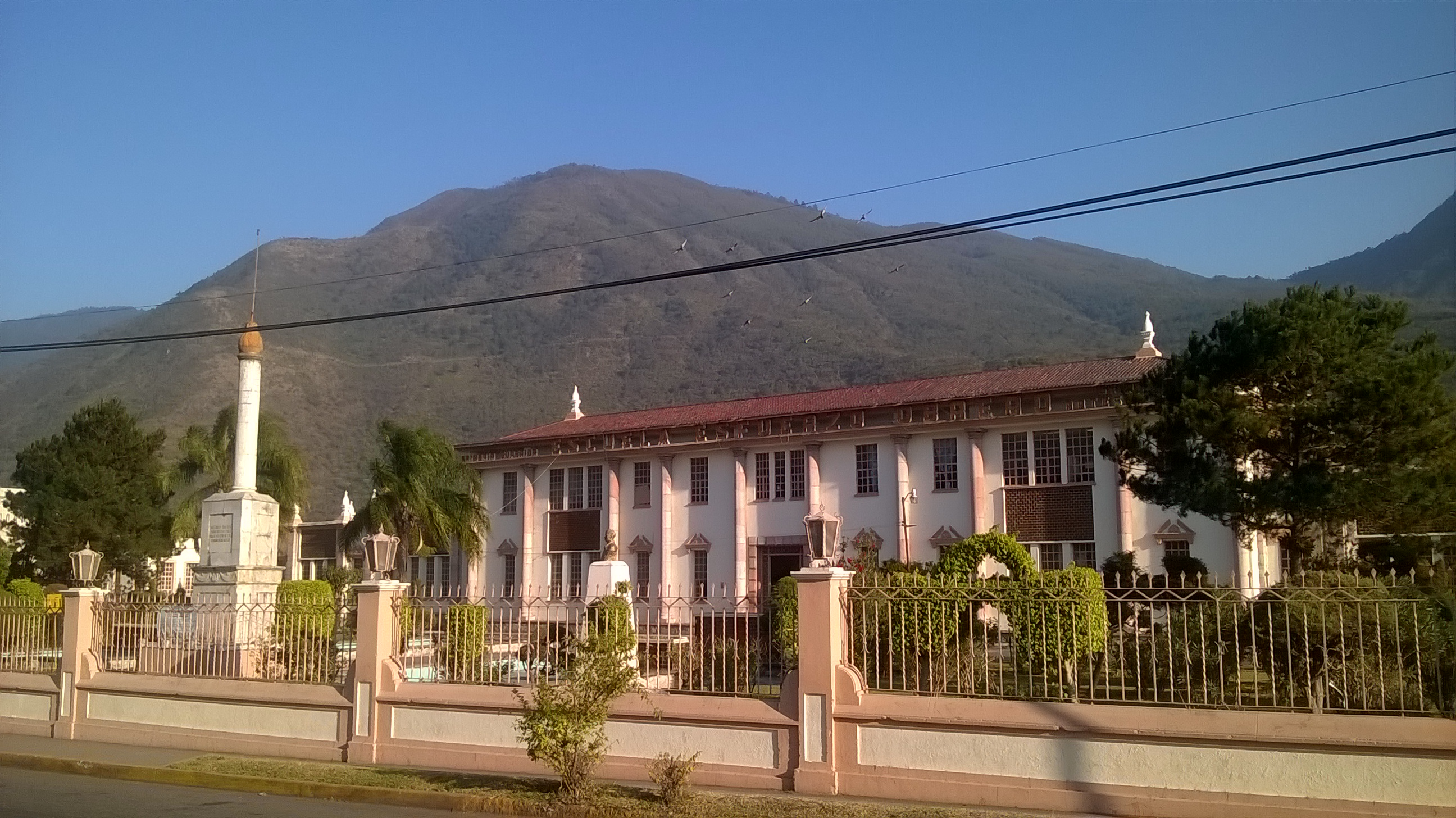

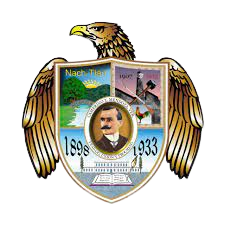
- Coat of arms

- Location in Mexico Camerino Z. Mendoza (Mexico)
- Country: Mexico
- State: Veracruz
- Demonym: (in Spanish)
- Time zone: UTC−6 (CST)

Camerino Z. Mendoza is a municipality in the Mexican state of Veracruz. It is located about 85 km from the state capital Xalapa. It has a surface of 37.84 km^{2}. It is located at 18°48′N 97°11′W. In 1898 there is established the head-board of Necoxtla's Municipality, in Santa Rosa; for decree of 1910 in village of Santa Rosa, it rises up to the category of Villa. Santa Rosa Necoxtla, in 1930, is named Camerino Z. Mendoza. By decree of November 5, 1932, the Municipality of Santa Rosa Necoxtla, it is named Camerino Z. Mendoza; the decree of July 4, 1933 raises to the political category of city, the Villa of Camerino Z. Mendoza.

== Geography ==
The municipality of Camerino Z. Mendoza is delimited to the north by Nogales, to the north-east by Huiloapan de Cuauhtémoc, to the south by Soledad Atzompa and to the south-west by Acultzingo. It is watered by tributaries of the White river.

The weather in Camerino Z. Mendoza is cold in all the year and has rains in summer and autumn.

=== Flora and fauna ===
The ecosystems that coexist in the municipality are the one of vegetation of pines, encino white and madroños; where a fauna composed by populations of wild mammals like rabbits, armadillos is developed, tlacuaches, raccoons, vixen and weasels.

== Agriculture ==
It produces principally maize and beans.

== Celebrations ==
In Camerino Z. Mendoza, in August takes place the celebration in honor to Santa Rosa de Lima Patron of the town.

== Toponymy ==
Named in honor of the great fighter of the Mexican Revolution, died in defense of its ideals of social justice Camerino Z. Mendoza.

== Commerce ==
The Municipality counts on 196 stores of clothes, 47 footwear, 7 stationery stores, 5 ironworks, 1 commercial house of materials for the construction, 13 houses with sale of parkings and 35 slaughters.

== Administrative subdivisión ==
The municipality is divided in two municipal agencies: Necoxtla and La Cuesta, whose agents are elect by means of popular plebiscite; in addition it exists a municipal subagency and 67 apple headquarters.
