= Coscomatepec =

Municipality in Veracruz, Mexico

- Municipality
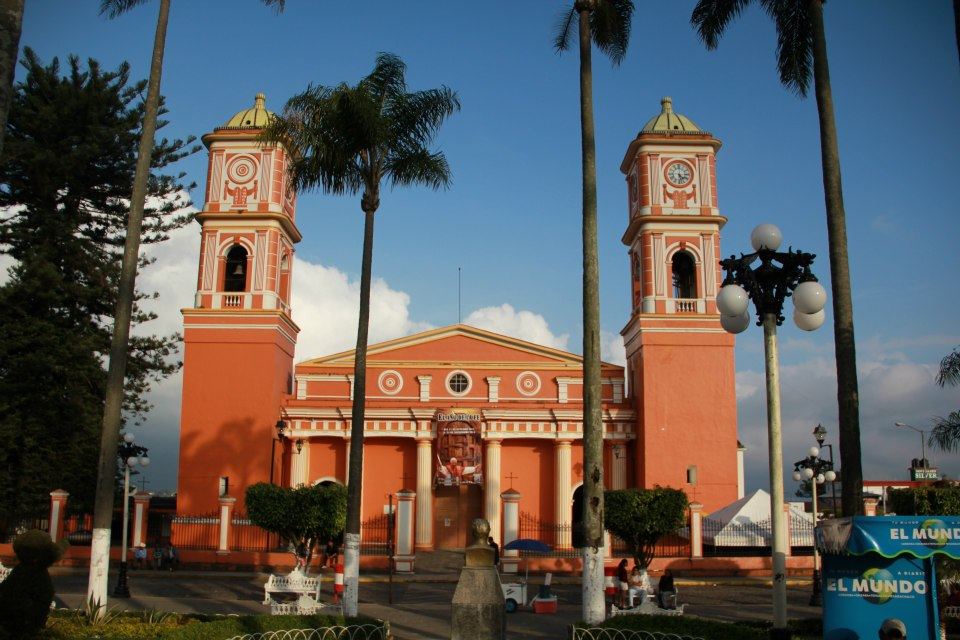

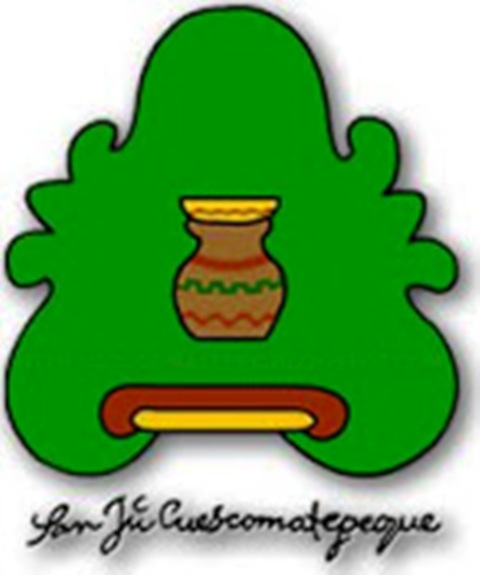
- Coat of arms

- Location in Mexico Coscomatepec (Mexico)
- Country: Mexico
- State: Veracruz
- Demonym: (in Spanish)
- Time zone: UTC−6 (CST)

Coscomatepec is a municipality in the Mexican state of Veracruz. It is located in the mountainous central zone of the state, about 50 km from Xalapa, the state capital. It has an area of 130.78 square kilometres (50.49 mi^{2}). It is located at 19°04′N 97°03′W.

== Geography ==
The municipality of Coscomatepec is bordered to the north by Alpatlahuac and Calcahualco, to the south by La Perla and Chocaman, to the east by Huatusco and to the west by Calcahualco and La Perla.

== Economy ==
Its principal products are maize, beans and potatoes.

== Culture ==
In Coscomatepec, the celebration in honor of San Juan Bautista, patron of the town takes place in June.
