= Chocamán =

Municipality in Veracruz, Mexico

- Municipality
- Location in Mexico Chocamán (Mexico)
- Country: Mexico
- State: Veracruz
- Demonym: (in Spanish)
- Time zone: UTC−6 (CST)

Chocamán is a municipality in the Mexican state of Veracruz. It is located about 146 km south of the Veracruz state capital Xalapa. It has an area of 41.13 km^{2}. It is located at 19°01′N 97°02′W.

== Geography ==
The municipality of Chocamán is delimited to the north and north-east by Coscomatepec, to the north-east and south by Fortín de las Flores, to the south-west by La Perla.

The weather in Chocamán is cold all year with rains in summer.

== Economy ==
It produces principally maize, beans, sugarcane and Coffee.

== Culture ==
A celebration in honor of Santa Cruz in May.
