= Mariano Escobedo, Veracruz =

Mariano Escobedo
- City and municipality
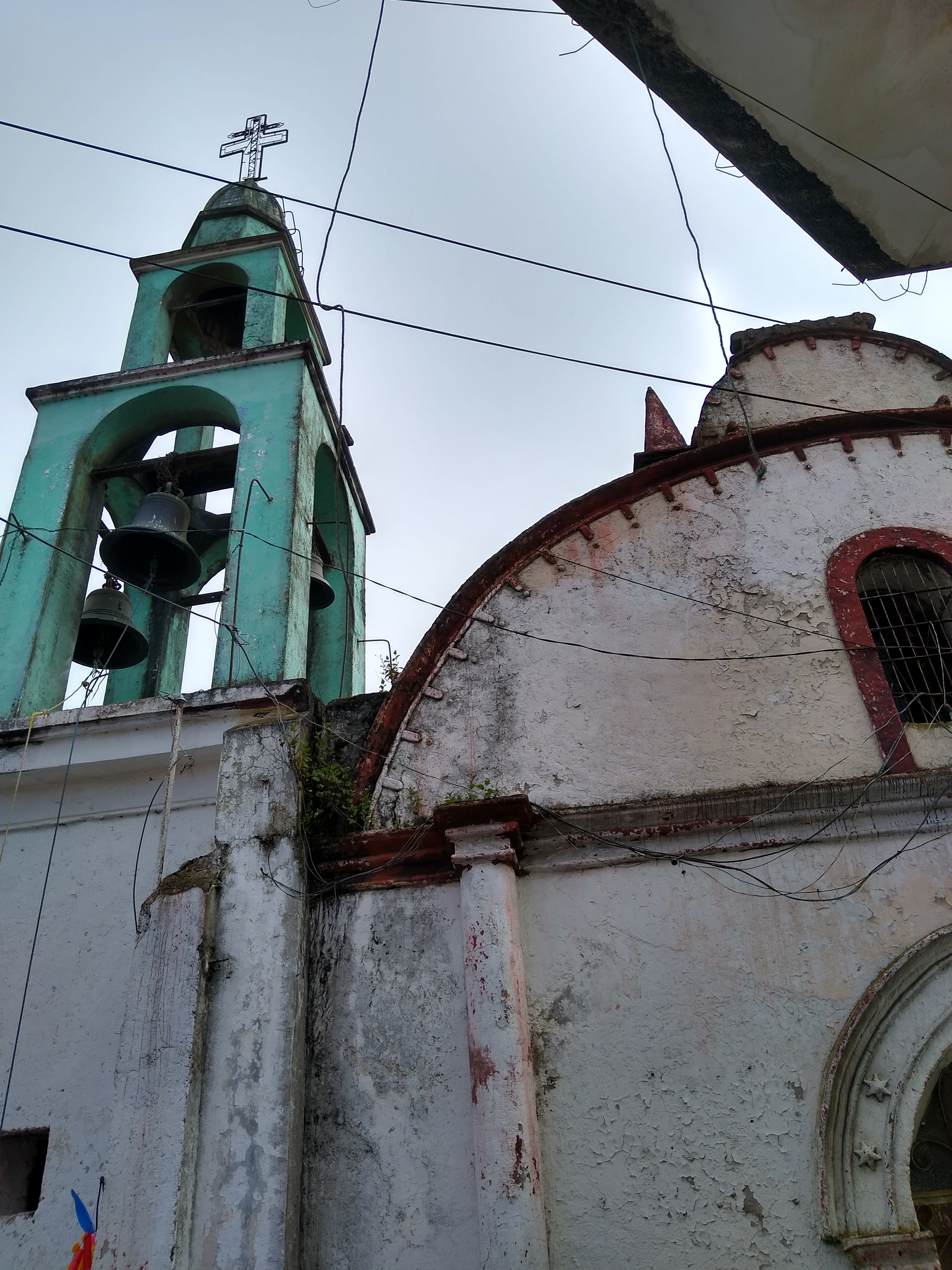
- Capilla de San Francisco Texmolac

- Location in Veracruz Mariano Escobedo (Mexico)
- Coordinates: 18°55′N 97°08′W
- Country: Mexico
- State: Veracruz

Population (2020)
  - Total: 38,670
  - Seat: 3,312
- Time zone: UTC-6 (Central Standard Time)

Mariano Escobedo is one of the 212 municipalities in the Mexican state of Veracruz. It is located in the central zone of the state, about 127 km from the state capital Xalapa. It has a surface of 103.64 km^{2}. It is located at 18°55′N 97°08′W.

== Geography ==
The municipality of Mariano Escobedo is delimited to the north by Puebla State, to the east by Atzacan Municipality and Ixtaczoquitlán Municipality, to the south by Orizaba Municipality, Maltrata Municipality and Ixhuatlancillo Municipality and to the west by Puebla State.

The weather in Mariano Escobedo is very cold all year with rains in summer and autumn.

== Products ==
It produces principally maize, beans, potatoes, sugarcane and coffee.

== Events ==
The municipality of Mariano Escobedo celebrates its traditional festivals in honor of the patron saint Saint Joseph, on March 19 to 21; dance of twelve pairs of partners, They have processions and a fair; and celebrates the founding day of the municipality on November 9 of each year. The celebration of religious festivities such as Holy Week and All Saints' Day, in April and November respectively; They are the most traditional festivals in the municipality. The typical costume is that of the peasant, which consists of a hat, shirt, pants and huaraches or shoes; A woman wears a dress, apron, huaraches or shoes.
