= Calcahualco =

City in Veracruz, Mexico

- City and municipality
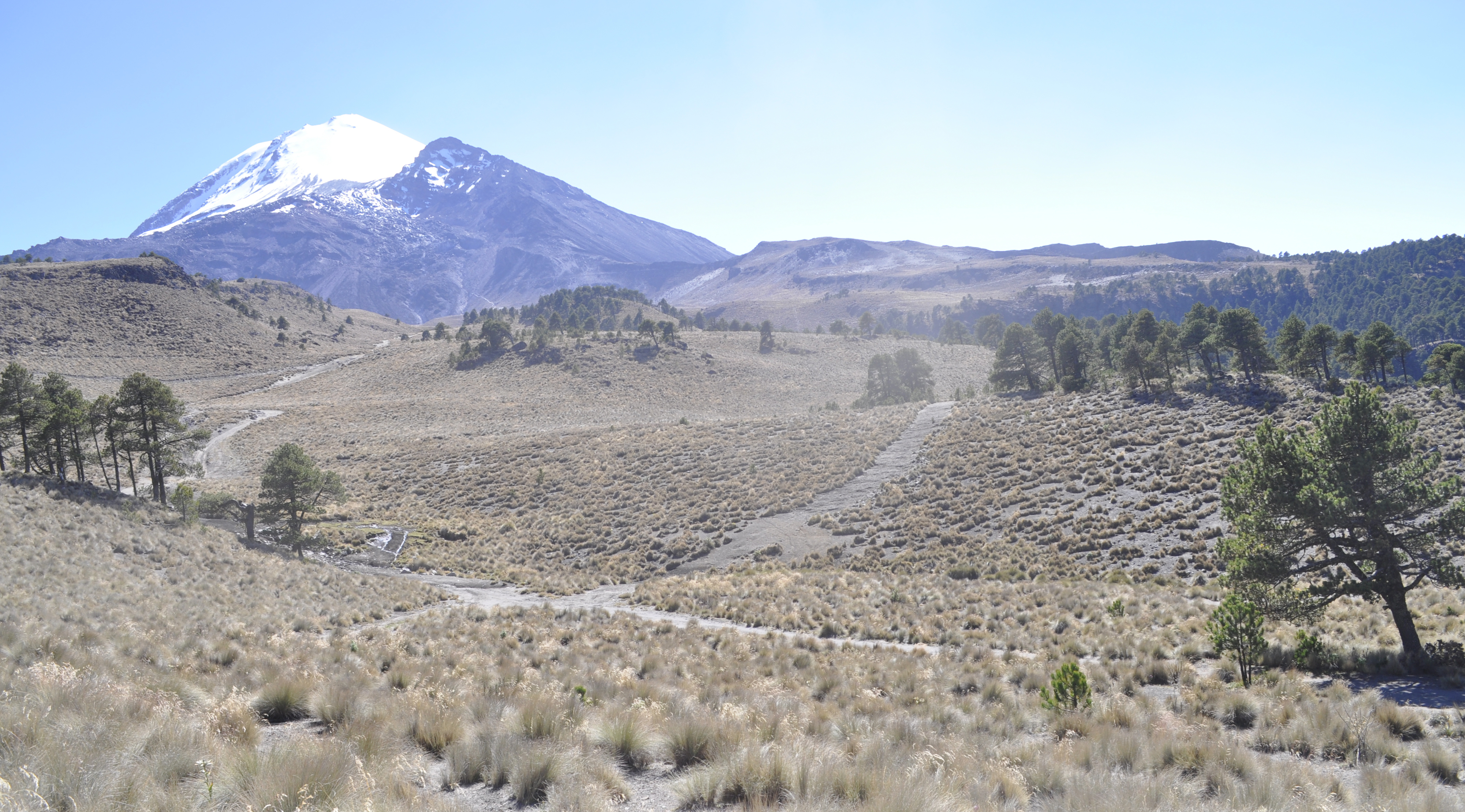
- Pico de Orizaba volcano

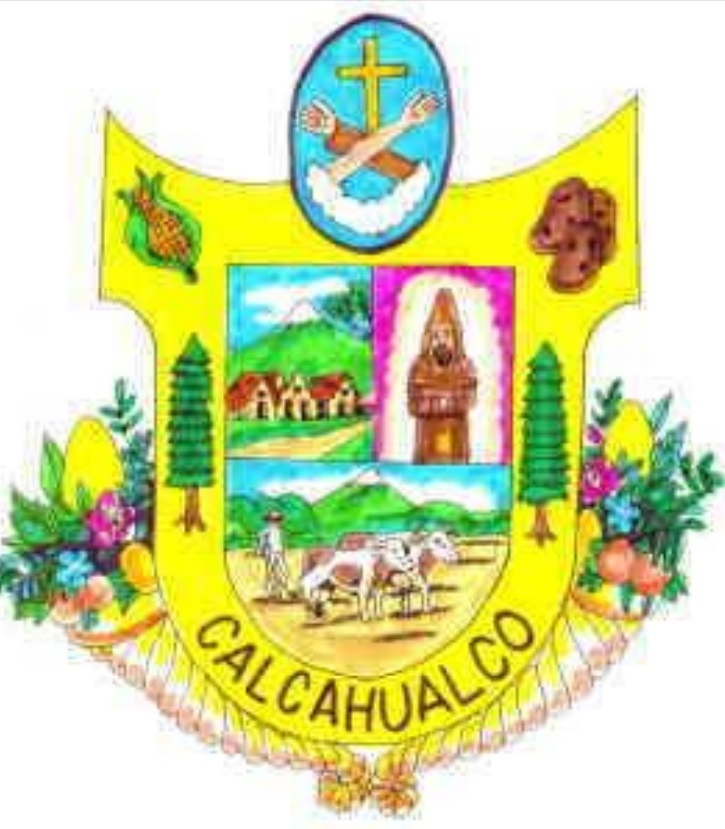
- Coat of arms

- Location in Veracruz Calcahualco (Mexico)
- Coordinates: 19°07′N 97°05′W
- Country: Mexico
- State: Veracruz
- Region: Mountains Region

Area
  - Total: 135 km^{2} (52 sq mi)
- Elevation: 2,150 m (7,050 ft)

Population (2020)
  - Municipality: 13,701

Calcahualco is a city and municipality in the Mexican state of Veracruz. It is in the Mountains Region.

The coffee grown in Calcahualco is famous.
