= List of American films of 2006 =

This is a list of American films released in 2006.

== Box office ==
The highest-grossing American films released in 2006, by domestic box office gross revenue, are as follows:

Highest-grossing films of 2006
Rank	Title	Distributor	Domestic gross
1	Pirates of the Caribbean: Dead Man's Chest	Disney	$423,315,812
2	Night at the Museum	20th Century Fox	$250,863,268
3	Cars	Disney	$244,082,982
4	X-Men: The Last Stand	20th Century Fox	$234,362,462
5	The Da Vinci Code	Sony	$217,536,138
6	Superman Returns	Warner Bros.	$200,081,192
7	Happy Feet	Warner Bros.	$198,000,317
8	Ice Age: The Meltdown	20th Century Fox	$195,330,621
9	Casino Royale	Sony	$167,445,960
10	The Pursuit of Happyness	Sony	$163,566,459

== January–March ==
Opening		Title	Production company	Cast and crew	Ref.
J A N U A R Y	6	BloodRayne	Boll KG Productions	Uwe Boll (director); Guinevere Turner (screenplay); Kristanna Loken, Ben Kingsley, Michael Madsen, Matthew Davis, Michelle Rodriguez, Will Sanderson, Billy Zane, Udo Kier, Michael Paré, Meat Loaf	
J A N U A R Y	6	Grandma's Boy	20th Century Fox / Level 1 Entertainment / Happy Madison Productions	Nicholaus Goossen (director); Allen Covert, Nick Swardson, Barry Wernick (screenplay); Allen Covert, Doris Roberts, Nick Swardson, Linda Cardellini, Shirley Jones, Shirley Knight, Peter Dante, Joel David Moore, Jonah Hill, Kevin Nealon, Kelvin Yu, Jonathan Loughran, Scott Halberstadt, Rob Schneider, David Spade, Kevin Nash, Ted Stryker, Frank Coraci, Chuck Church, Randal Reeder, Abdoulaye N'Gom, Todd Holland, Harry the Chimp	
J A N U A R Y	6	Hostel	Lions Gate Films / Screen Gems	Eli Roth (director/screenplay); Jay Hernandez, Derek Richardson, Eyþór Guðjónsson, Barbara Nedeljáková, Rick Hoffman	
J A N U A R Y	13	Glory Road	Walt Disney Pictures / Jerry Bruckheimer Films	James Gartner (director); Gregory Allen Howard, Chris Cleveland, Bettina Gilois (screenplay); Josh Lucas, Derek Luke, Jon Voight, Austin Nichols, Evan Jones, Alphonso McAuley, Tatyana Ali, Mehcad Brooks, Red West, Sam Jones III, Damaine Radcliff, Emily Deschanel, Al Shearer, David Dino Wells Jr., Schin A.S. Kerr, Wilbur Fitzgerald	
J A N U A R Y	13	Hoodwinked!	The Weinstein Company / Kanbar Entertainment	Cory Edwards, Todd Edwards, Tony Leech (directors/screenplay); Anne Hathaway, Glenn Close, Jim Belushi, Patrick Warburton, Anthony Anderson, David Ogden Stiers, Xzibit, Chazz Palminteri, Andy Dick, Cory Edwards, Ken Marino, Tom Kenny, Preston Stutzman, Tony Leech, Kevin Michael Richardson, Tara Strong, Todd Edwards, Kelly Stables, Benjy Gaither, Joshua J. Greene, Mark Primiano, Tye Edwards, Kathryn J. Lovegren	
J A N U A R Y	13	Last Holiday	Paramount Pictures / ImageMovers	Wayne Wang (director); Jeffrey Price and Peter S. Seaman (screenplay); Queen Latifah, LL Cool J, Timothy Hutton, Gérard Depardieu, Alicia Witt, Giancarlo Esposito, Susan Kellermann, Michael Nouri, Jane Adams, Ranjit Chowdhry, Jascha Washington, Matt Ross, Mike Estime, Jaqueline Fleming, Chloe Bailey, Halle Bailey, Dan Ziskie, Julia Lashae, Lucie Vondráčková, Emeril Lagasse, Smokey Robinson, Mervyn Warren	
J A N U A R Y	13	Tristan and Isolde	20th Century Fox / Franchise Pictures / Scott Free Productions	Kevin Reynolds (director); Dean Georgaris (screenplay); James Franco, Sophia Myles, Rufus Sewell, Mark Strong, Henry Cavill, David O'Hara, Bronagh Gallagher, Graham Mullins, JB Blanc, Dexter Fletcher, Barbora Kodetová, Thomas Brodie-Sangster	
J A N U A R Y	20	End of the Spear	Rocky Mountain Pictures	Jim Hanon (director/screenplay); Bill Ewing, Bart Gavigan (screenplay); Louie Leonardo, Chad Allen, Jack Guzman, Christina Souza, Sean McGowan, Beth Bailey, Matt Lutz, Gil Birmingham, Sara Kathryn Bakker, Cara Stoner, Stephen Caudill, Chemo Mepaquito, Jose Liberto Caizamo, Patrick Zeller, Madgalena Condoba	
J A N U A R Y	20	High School Musical	Disney Channel / Salty Pictures / First Street Films	Kenny Ortega (director); Peter Barsocchini (screenplay); Zac Efron, Vanessa Hudgens, Ashley Tisdale, Lucas Grabeel, Corbin Bleu, Monique Coleman, Alyson Reed, Bart Johnson, Olesya Rulin, Chris Warren Jr., Ryne Sanborn, Joey Miyashima, Leslie Wing Pomeroy, Kaycee Stroh, Nick Whitaker, Socorro Herrera, Irene Santiago-Baron, Joyce Cohen, Anne Kathryn Parma, Falcon Grace	
J A N U A R Y	20	Underworld: Evolution	Screen Gems / Lakeshore Entertainment	Len Wiseman (director); Danny McBride (screenplay); Kate Beckinsale, Scott Speedman, Tony Curran, Shane Brolly, Steven Mackintosh, Derek Jacobi, Bill Nighy, Sophia Myles, Michael Sheen, Zita Görög, Brian Steele, John Mann, Andrew Kavadas, Kayla Levins, Lily Mo Sheen	
J A N U A R Y	27	Annapolis	Touchstone Pictures	Justin Lin (director); Dave Collard (screenplay); James Franco, Tyrese Gibson, Jordana Brewster, Roger Fan, Donnie Wahlberg, Vicellous Reon Shannon, Chi McBride, Brian Goodman, Charles Napier, Wilmer Calderon, Jim Parrack, Heather Henderson, Zachery Ty Bryan, Billy Finnigan, Rocco Rosanio, McCaleb Burnett, Matt Myers	
J A N U A R Y	27	Big Momma's House 2	20th Century Fox / Regency Enterprises	John Whitesell (director); Don Rhymer (screenplay); Martin Lawrence, Nia Long, Zachary Levi, Mark Moses, Emily Procter, Kat Dennings, Chloë Grace Moretz, Marisol Nichols, Jascha Washington, Sarah Joy Brown, Kevin Durand, Cameron Daddo, Christopher Jones, Josh Flitter, Max Van Ville, Rhoda Griffis, Kirk B.R. Woller, Ann Mahoney, Shanna Moakler, Andy Stahl, Lisa Arrindell, Jessica White, Paige Butcher	
J A N U A R Y	27	Nanny McPhee	Universal Pictures / StudioCanal / Metro-Goldwyn-Mayer / Working Title Films	Kirk Jones (director); Emma Thompson (screenplay); Emma Thompson, Colin Firth, Kelly Macdonald, Thomas Brodie-Sangster, Angela Lansbury, Eliza Bennett, Raphaël Coleman, Imelda Staunton, Samuel Honywood, Holly Gibbs, Celia Imrie, Derek Jacobi, Patrick Barlow, Phyllida Law, Adam Godley, Jennifer Rae Daykin, Hebe and Zinnia Barnes, Freya Fumic	
F E B R U A R Y	3	Something New	Focus Features	Sanaa Hamri (director); Kriss Turner (screenplay); Sanaa Lathan, Simon Baker, Blair Underwood, Donald Faison, Alfre Woodard, Earl Billings, Wendy Raquel Robinson, Mike Epps, Katharine Towne, Stanley DeSantis, Julie Mond, Lee Garlington, Taraji P. Henson, Golden Brooks, Tanisha Harper, Marcus Brown, Russell Hornsby, Tonita Castro, Matt Malloy, David Monahan, Sommore, Henry Simmons, Rose Rollins, Rick Fitts, John Ratzenberger	
F E B R U A R Y	3	When a Stranger Calls	Screen Gems / Davis Entertainment	Simon West (director); Jake Wade Wall (screenplay); Camilla Belle, Brian Geraghty, Katie Cassidy, Clark Gregg, Tommy Flanagan, Tessa Thompson, Derek de Lint, Kate Jennings Grant, David Denman, Madeline Carroll, Steve Eastin, Lance Henriksen, Dianna Agron, Arthur Young, John Bobek, Brad Surosky, Rosine Ace Hatem, Escher Holloway, Lillie West	
F E B R U A R Y	10	Curious George	Universal Pictures / Imagine Entertainment	Matthew O'Callaghan (director); Ken Kaufman (screenplay); Will Ferrell, Drew Barrymore, David Cross, Eugene Levy, Joan Plowright, Dick Van Dyke, Frank Welker, Ed O'Ross, Shane Baumel, Jessie Flower, Alexander Gould, Ariel Winter, Billy West, Jeff Bennett, Michael Chinyamurindi, Michael Sorich, Kath Soucie, Clint Howard, Kimberly Brooks, Joey D'Auria, Richard Epcar, Treva Etienne, Eddie Frierson, Don Fullilove, Bridget Hoffman, Rif Hutton, John Mariano, Fred Tatasciore	
F E B R U A R Y	10	The Pink Panther	Metro-Goldwyn-Mayer / Columbia Pictures	Shawn Levy (director); Steve Martin, Len Blum (screenplay); Steve Martin, Kevin Kline, Jean Reno, Emily Mortimer, Henry Czerny, Kristin Chenoweth, Roger Rees, Beyoncé Knowles, William Abadie, Scott Adkins, Philip Goodwin, Henri Garcin, Jean Dell, Anna Katarina, Jason Statham, Clive Owen, Boris McGiver, Alice Taglioni, Greg Salata, Chuck Jeffreys, Kristi Angus, Chelah Horsdal, Delphine Chanéac, Yvonne Sciò	
F E B R U A R Y	10	Final Destination 3	New Line Cinema / Hard Eight Pictures / Zide/Perry Productions	James Wong (director/screenplay); Glen Morgan (screenplay); Mary Elizabeth Winstead, Ryan Merriman, Kris Lemche, Alexz Johnson, Amanda Crew, Jesse Moss, Gina Holden, Texas Battle, Chelan Simmons, Crystal Lowe, Maggie Ma, Ecstasia Sanders, Jody Racicot, Patrick Gallagher, Harris Allan, Andrew Francis, Cory Monteith, Dustin Milligan, Tony Todd, Agam Darshi	
F E B R U A R Y	10	Firewall	Warner Bros. Pictures / Village Roadshow Pictures / Beacon Pictures / Thunder Road Films	Richard Loncraine (director); Joe Forte (screenplay); Harrison Ford, Paul Bettany, Virginia Madsen, Mary Lynn Rajskub, Jimmy Bennett, Carly Schroeder, Robert Forster, Robert Patrick, Nikolaj Coster-Waldau, Alan Arkin, Vincent Gale, Kett Turton, Vince Vieluf, Matthew Currie Holmes, Beverley Breuer, David Lewis, Eric Keenleyside, Ona Grauer, Andrew McNee, Ty Olsson	
F E B R U A R Y	17	Date Movie	20th Century Fox / Regency Enterprises	Jason Friedberg and Aaron Seltzer (directors/screenplay); Alyson Hannigan, Adam Campbell, Jennifer Coolidge, Tony Cox, Fred Willard, Eddie Griffin, Carmen Electra, Judah Friedlander, Sophie Monk, Meera Simhan, Marie Matiko, Valery Ortiz, Mauricio Sanchez, Frank Welker, Beverly Polcyn, Scott Speedman, Tom Lenk, Lil Jon, Josh Meyers, Edward Moss, Jack Cortes, Tom Fitzpatrick, Nadia Dina Ariqat, Nick Steele, Jasen Salvatore, Bridget Ann Brno	
F E B R U A R Y	17	Eight Below	Walt Disney Pictures / Spyglass Entertainment / Mandeville Films	Frank Marshall (director); David DiGillio (screenplay); Paul Walker, Bruce Greenwood, Moon Bloodgood, Jason Biggs, August Schellenberg, Wendy Crewson, Belinda Metz, Duncan Fraser, Malcolm Stewart, Gerard Plunkett, Connor Christopher Levins, Michael David Simms	
F E B R U A R Y	17	Freedomland	Columbia Pictures / Revolution Studios	Joe Roth (director); Richard Price (screenplay); Samuel L. Jackson, Julianne Moore, Edie Falco, Ron Eldard, William Forsythe, Aunjanue Ellis, Anthony Mackie, LaTanya Richardson, Clarke Peters, Peter Friedman, Domenick Lombardozzi, Aasif Mandvi, Philip Bosco, Dorian Missick, Haneefah Wood, Marlon Sherman, Patricia Mauceri, Richard Price, Liza Colón-Zayas, Colman Domingo, D.C. Benny, Chance Kelly, Ernestine Jackson, Leonard L. Thomas, Amanda Diva Seales	
F E B R U A R Y	21	Stuart Little 3: Call of the Wild	Sony Pictures Home Entertainment / Red Wagon Entertainment	Audu Paden (director); Bob Shaw, Don McEnery (screenplay); Michael J. Fox, Geena Davis, Hugh Laurie, Wayne Brady, Kevin Schon, Corey Padnos, Virginia Madsen, Peter MacNicol, Rino Romano, Tara Strong, Charlie Adler, Kath Soucie, Garry Chalk, Tom Kenny, Sophia Paden	
F E B R U A R Y	24	Doogal	The Weinstein Company	Dave Borthwick, Jean Duval, Frank Passingham (directors); Butch Hartman, Cory Edwards (screenplay); Daniel Tay, Kylie Minogue, Jon Stewart, William H. Macy, Chevy Chase, Whoopi Goldberg, Jimmy Fallon, Bill Hader, Ian McKellen, Kevin Smith, Judi Dench, John Krasinski, Cory Edwards, Eric Robinson, Heidi Brook Myers	
F E B R U A R Y	24	Madea's Family Reunion	Lionsgate / The Tyler Perry Company	Tyler Perry (director/screenplay); Tyler Perry, Blair Underwood, Keke Palmer, Lynn Whitfield, Lisa Arrindell Anderson, Jenifer Lewis, Rochelle Aytes, Boris Kodjoe, Henry Simmons, Maya Angelou, Tangi Miller, Cicely Tyson, Georgia Allen, Cassi Davis, Afemo Omilami, Judge Mablean Ephriam, Johnny Gill, China Anne McClain, China Anderson, Akhil Jackson, Alonzo Millsap, Leon Lamar, John Lawhorn, Deanna Dawn, Enoch King, Elizabeth Omilami, Nicholas Ortiz	
F E B R U A R Y	24	Running Scared	New Line Cinema / Media 8 Entertainment	Wayne Kramer (director/screenplay); Paul Walker, Cameron Bright, Vera Farmiga, Chazz Palminteri, Karel Roden, Johnny Messner, Ivana Miličević, Michael Cudlitz, John Noble, Alex Neuberger, Bruce Altman, Elizabeth Mitchell, Arthur J. Nascarella, Idalis DeLeon, David Warshofsky, Jim Tooey, Thomas Rosales Jr., Glenn Wrage	
F E B R U A R Y	25	Mrs. Harris	HBO Films / John Wells Productions / Killer Films / Number 9 Films	Phyllis Nagy (director/screenplay); Annette Bening, Ben Kingsley, Cloris Leachman, Frank Whaley, Bill Smitrovich, Chloë Sevigny, Francis Fisher, Michael Gross, Cristine Rose, Mary McDonnell, Philip Baker Hall, Robert Cicchini, Michael Paul Chan, Ellen Burstyn, Nan Martin, Lisa Edelstein, Brett Butler, Lee Garlington, Jessica Tuck, John Rubinstein, Larry Drake, Ronald Guttman, John Patrick Amedori, Jessica Kate Meyer, Dean Norris, Lauren Storm, Kirsten Nelson, Caroline Lagerfelt, Vicki Lewis, Margaret Easley, Heidemarie Fuentes, Andy Milder, Michael C. Moore	
M A R C H	3	16 Blocks	Warner Bros. Pictures / Alcon Entertainment / Millennium Films / The Donners' Company	Richard Donner (director); Richard Wenk (screenplay); Bruce Willis, Mos Def, David Morse, Jenna Stern, Casey Sander, Cylk Cozart, David Zayas, Sasha Roiz, Conrad Pla, Peter McRobbie, Robert Clohessy, Kim Chan, Scott McCord, Steve Kahan, Tom Wlaschiha, Rob Wiethoff, Robert Racki, Patrick Gallow, Hechter Ubarry, Richard Fitzpatrick, Mike Keenan, Jess Mal Gibbons, Tig Fong, Brenda Pressley, Carmen Lopez	
M A R C H	3	Aquamarine	20th Century Fox / Fox 2000 Pictures	Elizabeth Allen (director); John Quaintance, Jessica Bendinger (screenplay); Sara Paxton, Emma Roberts, JoJo, Jake McDorman, Arielle Kebbel, Claudia Karvan, Bruce Spence, Tammin Sursok, Roy Billing, Julia Blake, Shaun Micallef, Lulu McClatchy, Natasha Cunningham, Dichen Lachman, Lincoln Lewis	
M A R C H	3	Dave Chappelle's Block Party	Rogue Pictures / Bob Yari Productions	Michel Gondry (director); Dave Chappelle (screenplay); Dave Chappelle, Kanye West, Mos Def, Common, John Legend, Talib Kweli, Jill Scott, Erykah Badu, The Roots, Big Daddy Kane, Kool G Rap, The Fugees, Bilal, Dead Prez, Cody Chesnutt, Central State University Marching Band, A-Trak	
M A R C H	3	Ultraviolet	Screen Gems	Kurt Wimmer (director/screenplay); Milla Jovovich, Cameron Bright, Nick Chinlund, William Fichtner, Kurt Wimmer, Richard Jackson, Scott Piper, Sebastien Andrieu, Christopher Garner, Ricardo Mamood-Vega, Jennifer Caputo, Duc Luu, Kieran O'Rorke, Ryan Martin, Digger Mesch	
M A R C H	10	Failure to Launch	Paramount Pictures	Tom Dey (director); Tom J. Astle, Matt Ember (screenplay); Matthew McConaughey, Sarah Jessica Parker, Zooey Deschanel, Justin Bartha, Bradley Cooper, Terry Bradshaw, Kathy Bates, Adam Alexi-Malle, Tyrel Jackson Williams, Katheryn Winnick, Rob Corddry, Patton Oswalt, Mageina Tovah, Stephen Tobolowsky, Kate McGregor-Stewart, Peter Jacobson, Aubrey Dollar, Ilana Levine	
M A R C H	10	Game 6	Kindred Media Group / Serenade Films / Double Play	Michael Hoffman (director); Don DeLillo (screenplay); Michael Keaton, Bebe Neuwirth, Griffin Dunne, Catherine O'Hara, Robert Downey Jr., Ari Graynor, Shalom Harlow, Nadia Dajani, Harris Yulin, Roger Rees, Tom Aldredge, Lillias White, Amir Ali Said, John Tormey, Rock Kohli, Harry Bugin, Neal Jones, Bobby Steggert, Craig Castaldo, Roger Clemens, Bern Cohen, Danny Doherty, Jeffrey Grossman, Vin Scully	
M A R C H	10	The Hills Have Eyes	Fox Searchlight Pictures	Alexandre Aja (director/screenplay); Grégory Levasseur (screenplay); Aaron Stanford, Kathleen Quinlan, Vinessa Shaw, Emilie de Ravin, Dan Byrd, Robert Joy, Ted Levine, Billy Drago, Desmond Askew, Ezra Buzzington, Michael Bailey Smith, Tom Bower, Greg Nicotero, Laura Ortiz, Maisie Camilleri Preziosi, Ivana Turchetto, Judith Jane Vallette, Adam Perrell	
M A R C H	10	The Libertine	The Weinstein Company	Laurence Dunmore (director); Stephen Jeffreys (screenplay); Johnny Depp, Samantha Morton, John Malkovich, Rosamund Pike, Tom Hollander, Johnny Vegas, Richard Coyle, Rupert Friend, Jack Davenport, Kelly Reilly, Clare Higgins, Francesca Annis, Tom Burke, Hugh Sachs, Stanley Townsend, Freddie Jones, Robert Wilfort, Paul Chahidi, Kevin Doyle, Niall Buggy, Peter Howell, T.P. McKenna, Maimie McCoy, Cara Horgan, Sacha Bennett	
M A R C H	10	The Shaggy Dog	Walt Disney Pictures / Mandeville Films	Brian Robbins (director); Cormac Wibberley, Marianne Wibberley, Geoff Rodkey, Jack Amiel, Michael Begler (screenplay); Tim Allen, Robert Downey Jr., Kristin Davis, Danny Glover, Spencer Breslin, Jane Curtin, Zena Grey, Philip Baker Hall, Joshua Leonard, Jarrad Paul, Rhea Seehorn, Shawn Pyfrom, Joel David Moore, Crystal the Monkey, Jane Hajduk, Adam Hicks, Cole, Bess Wohl, Jordyn Coleman, Martin Sru	
M A R C H	17	She's the Man	DreamWorks Pictures / Lakeshore Entertainment / The Donners' Company	Andy Fickman (director); Karen McCullah Lutz, Kirsten Smith (screenplay); Amanda Bynes, Channing Tatum, Laura Ramsey, David Cross, Vinnie Jones, Alex Breckenridge, Robert Hoffman, Jonathan Sadowski, Emily Perkins, James Kirk, James Snyder, Julie Hagerty, John Pyper-Ferguson, Brandon Jay McLaren, Clifton Murray, Amanda Crew, Jessica Lucas, Lynda Boyd, Katie Stuart, Robert Torti, Mark Acheson, Ken Kirby, David Richmond-Peck, Tania Saulnier	
M A R C H	17	Thank You for Smoking	Fox Searchlight Pictures	Jason Reitman (director/screenplay); Aaron Eckhart, Maria Bello, Cameron Bright, Adam Brody, Sam Elliott, Katie Holmes, David Koechner, Rob Lowe, William H. Macy, J.K. Simmons, Robert Duvall, Kim Dickens, Marianne Muellerleile, Todd Louiso, Connie Ray, Dennis Miller, Melora Hardin, Jordan Garrett, Richard Speight Jr., Aaron Lustig, Brian Palermo, Spencer Garrett, Earl Billings, Catherine Reitman, David O. Sacks, Roy Jenkins, Howard Weitzman, Bruce French, Joan Lunden, Nancy O'Dell, Dana E. Glauberman, Aloma Wright, Daniel Travis, Michael Mantell, Tonyo Melendez	
M A R C H	17	V for Vendetta	Warner Bros. Pictures / Virtual Studios / Silver Pictures	James McTeigue (director); The Wachowskis (screenplay); Natalie Portman, Hugo Weaving, Stephen Rea, John Hurt, Stephen Fry, Tim Pigott-Smith, Rupert Graves, Roger Allam, Ben Miles, Sinéad Cusack, Natasha Wightman, John Standing, Eddie Marsan, Clive Ashborn, Guy Henry, Ian Burfield, Chad Stahelski, Amelda Brown, John Ringham, Malcolm Sinclair, Selina Giles, Martin Savage, Imogen Poots, Laura Greenwood, Paul Antony-Barber, Mary Stockley, David Leitch	
M A R C H	24	Inside Man	Universal Pictures / Imagine Entertainment / 40 Acres and a Mule Filmworks	Spike Lee (director); Russell Gewirtz (screenplay); Denzel Washington, Clive Owen, Jodie Foster, Christopher Plummer, Willem Dafoe, Chiwetel Ejiofor, Kim Director, James Ransone, Peter Gerety, Victor Colicchio, Peter Frechette, Waris Ahluwalia, Daryl "Chill" Mitchell, Ashlie Atkinson, Ken Leung, Marcia Jean Kurtz, Lemon Andersen, Jason Manuel Olazabal, Anthony Mangano, Shon Gables, Dominic Carter, Spike Lee, Carlos Andrés Gomez, Bernie Rachelle, Cassandra Freeman, Gerry Vichi, David Brown, Robert C. Kirk, Ed Onipede Blunt, Amir Ali Said, Samantha Ivers, Jeff Ward	
M A R C H	24	Larry the Cable Guy: Health Inspector	Lionsgate	Trent Cooper (director); James Greer, Jonathan Bernstein (screenplay); Larry the Cable Guy, Iris Bahr, Bruce Bruce, Joanna Cassidy, Brooke Dillman, Tony Hale, David Koechner, Lisa Lampanelli, Megyn Price, Tom Wilson, Joe Pantoliano, Michael Papajohn, Tom Hillmann, Kid Rock, Jerry Mathers, Eric Esteban, Kristen Wharton, John Fiore, David McCharen, Randy Molnar, Lance Smith	
M A R C H	24	The Secret	Prime Time Productions / Dharma Production	Drew Heriot (director)	
M A R C H	24	Stay Alive	Hollywood Pictures / Spyglass Entertainment / Endgame Entertainment	William Brent Bell (director/screenplay); Matthew Peterman (screenplay); Jon Foster, Samaire Armstrong, Frankie Muniz, Jimmi Simpson, Milo Ventimiglia, Sophia Bush, Adam Goldberg, Wendell Pierce, Rio Hackford, Billy Slaughter, James Haven, Alice Krige, Maria Kalinina, Nicole Oppermann	
M A R C H	24	Unidentified	Five & Two Pictures / Cornerstone Television	Rich Christiano (director/screenplay); Jonathan Aube, Josh Adamson, Michael Blain-Rozgay, Rebecca St. James, Jenna Bailey, Lance Zitron	
M A R C H	31	ATL	Warner Bros. Pictures / Overbrook Entertainment	Chris Robinson (director); Tina Gordon Chism (screenplay); Tip "T.I." Harris, Lauren London, Evan Ross, Jackie Long, Jason Weaver, Big Boi, Lonette McKee, Mykelti Williamson, Keith David, Markice Moore, Tasha Smith, Monica Arnold, Big Gipp, Bone Crusher, Killer Mike, Jazze Pha, Albert Daniels, April Clark, Khadijah Haqq, Malika Haqq, Tae Heckerd, Buffie Carruth	
M A R C H	31	Basic Instinct 2	Metro-Goldwyn-Mayer / Constantin Film / C2 Pictures / Intermedia Films	Michael Caton-Jones (director); Henry Bean, Leora Barish (screenplay); Sharon Stone, David Morrissey, Charlotte Rampling, David Thewlis, Flora Montgomery, Heathcote Williams, Hugh Dancy, Indira Varma, Anne Caillon, Iain Robertson, Stan Collymore, Kata Dobó, Jan Chappell	
M A R C H	31	Ice Age: The Meltdown	20th Century Fox / Blue Sky Studios	Carlos Saldanha (director); Peter Gaulke, Gerry Swallow, Jim Hecht (screenplay); Ray Romano, John Leguizamo, Denis Leary, Queen Latifah, Seann William Scott, Josh Peck, Will Arnett, Jay Leno, Alan Tudyk, Chris Wedge, Tom Fahn, Clea Lewis, Debi Derryberry, Joseph Bologna, Marshall Efron, James Godwin, Jansen Panettiere, Stephen Root, Carlos Saldanha, James Sie, Mindy Sterling, Renée Taylor, Jack Angel, Shane Baumel, Bob Bergen, Rodger Bumpass, Paul Butcher, John Cygan, Jennifer Darling, Bill Farmer, Crispin Freeman, Jess Harnell, Sherry Lynn, Danny Mann, Laura Marano, Madeleine Martin, Laraine Newman, Jan Rabson, Zack Shada, Ariel Winter	
M A R C H	31	Slither	Universal Pictures / Gold Circle Films	James Gunn (director/screenplay); Nathan Fillion, Elizabeth Banks, Gregg Henry, Michael Rooker, Tania Saulnier, Jenna Fischer, Haig Sutherland, Matreya Fedor, Ben Cotton, Dustin Milligan, Lorena Gale, Darren Shahlavi, Magda Apanowicz, Lloyd Kaufman, Rob Zombie, James Gunn, Don Thompson, Brenda James, Jennifer Copping, William MacDonald, Iris Quinn, Tom Heaton, Dee Jay Jackson	

== April–June ==
Opening		Title	Production company	Cast and crew	Ref.
A P R I L	7	The Benchwarmers	Columbia Pictures / Revolution Studios / Happy Madison Productions	Dennis Dugan (director); Allen Covert, Nick Swardson (screenplay); Rob Schneider, David Spade, Jon Heder, Jon Lovitz, Nick Swardson, Craig Kilborn, Molly Sims, Tim Meadows, Erinn Bartlett, Amaury Nolasco, Brooke Langton, Bill Romanowski, John Farley, Reggie Jackson, Sean Salisbury, Patrick Schwarzenegger, Dan Patrick, Terry Crews, Ray Nicholson, Jackie Sandler, Jared Sandler, Rachel Hunter, Blake Clark, Dennis Dugan, Jonathan Loughran, Ron Masak, Mary Jo Catlett, Lochlyn Munro, Matt Willig, Cleo King, Ellie Schneider, Jon Moscot, Doug Jones, James Earl Jones, William Daniels, Matt Weinberg, Max Prado, Joe Gnoffo, Jillian Henry, Garrett Julian, Alex Warrick, Danny McCarthy, Cole Hockenbury, Rob Moore, Charles Dugan, Bob Sexton, Tom Silardi, Michael Moore, J.J. Darwish, Gabriel Pimental	
A P R I L	7	Friends with Money	Sony Pictures Classics	Nicole Holofcener (director/screenplay); Jennifer Aniston, Joan Cusack, Catherine Keener, Frances McDormand, Jason Isaacs, Scott Caan, Simon McBurney, Greg Germann, Marin Hinkle, Timm Sharp, Jake Cherry, Ty Burrell, Bob Stephenson, Mitch Rouse, Max Burkholder, Maulik Pancholy, Kristin Minter, Bobby Coleman, Tonita Castro, Ileen Getz, Reggie Austin, Romy Rosemont, Wendy Phillips, Hallie Foote	
A P R I L	7	Lucky Number Slevin	Metro-Goldwyn-Mayer / The Weinstein Company / Ascendant Pictures / FilmEngine	Paul McGuigan (director); Jason Smilovic (screenplay); Josh Hartnett, Lucy Liu, Ben Kingsley, Bruce Willis, Morgan Freeman, Stanley Tucci, Peter Outerbridge, Kevin Chamberlin, Dorian Missick, Mykelti Williamson, Sam Jaeger, Danny Aiello, Corey Stoll, Robert Forster, Jennifer Miller, Daniel Kash, Dmitry Chepovetsky, Oliver Davis, Sebastien Roberts, Gerry Mendicino, Diego Klattenhoff, Kwasi Songui, Michael Rubenfeld, Scott Gibson, Rami Posner, Darren Marsman	
A P R I L	7	Phat Girlz	Fox Searchlight Pictures	Nnegest Likké (director/screenplay); Mo'Nique, Jimmy Jean-Louis, Godfrey, Kendra C. Johnson, Dayo Ade, Jack Noseworthy, Eric Roberts, Raven Goodwin, Joyful Drake, Felix Pire, Charles Duckworth, Crystal Rivers	
A P R I L	7	Take the Lead	New Line Cinema / Tiara Blu Films	Liz Friedlander (director); Dianne Houston (screenplay); Antonio Banderas, Alfre Woodard, John Ortiz, Rob Brown, Yaya DaCosta, Dante Basco, Elijah Kelley, Jenna Dewan, Laura Benanti, Jasika Nicole, Lauren Collins, Marcus T. Paulk, Katya Virshilas, Jonathan Malen, Joseph Pierre, Alison Sealy-Smith, Kevin Hanchard, Lyriq Bent, Brandon D. Andrews, Shawand McKenzie, Phillip Jarrett, Jo Chim, Sharron Matthews	
A P R I L	14	Hard Candy	Lionsgate / Vulcan Productions / Launchpad Productions	David Slade (director); Brian Nelson (screenplay); Patrick Wilson, Elliot Page, Sandra Oh, Jennifer Holmes	
A P R I L	14	The Notorious Bettie Page	Picturehouse / HBO Films / Killer Films / John Wells Productions	Mary Harron (director/screenplay); Guinevere Turner (screenplay); Gretchen Mol, Chris Bauer, Jared Harris, Sarah Paulson, Cara Seymour, David Strathairn, Lili Taylor, John Cullum, Matt McGrath, Austin Pendleton, Norman Reedus, Dallas Roberts, Victor Slezak, Tara Subkoff, Kevin Carroll, Ann Dowd, Michael Gaston, Jefferson Mays, Peter McRobbie, Dan Snook, Jonathan Woodward, John Boyd, David Call, Geoffrey Cantor, Max Casella, Alejandro Chabán, Jack Gilpin, Aaron Lazar, Edmund Lyndeck, Naelee Rae, Alicia Sable, Kohl Sudduth, Benjamin Walker, R. Brandon Johnson, Bettie Page, John Ventimiglia	
A P R I L	14	Scary Movie 4	The Weinstein Company / Dimension Films / Miramax Films	David Zucker (director); Jim Abrahams, Craig Mazin, Pat Proft (screenplay); Anna Faris, Regina Hall, Craig Bierko, Bill Pullman, Anthony Anderson, Carmen Electra, Chris Elliott, Kevin Hart, Cloris Leachman, Michael Madsen, Molly Shannon, Charlie Sheen, Leslie Nielsen, Shaquille O'Neal, Beau Mirchoff, Conchita Campbell, Craig Mazin, DeRay Davis, Patrice O'Neal, Bryan Callen, Alonzo Bodden, Drew Mikuska, Campbell Lane, David Zucker, Edward Moss, Dave Attell, John Reardon, Christie Laing, Beverley Breuer, Chris Williams, Phil McGraw, Simon Rex, Debra Wilson, James Earl Jones, Holly Madison, Bridget Marquardt, Kendra Wilkinson, Lil Jon, Fabolous, Chingy, Crystal Lowe, Bubba Sparxxx, Bone Crusher, YoungBloodZ, Michael McDonald	
A P R I L	14	The Wild	Walt Disney Pictures	Steve Williams (director); Ed Decter, John J. Strauss, Mark Gibson, Philip Halprin (screenplay); Kiefer Sutherland, Jim Belushi, Eddie Izzard, Janeane Garofalo, William Shatner, Richard Kind, Greg Cipes, Colin Cunningham, Patrick Warburton, Colin Hay, Jack DeSena, Don Cherry, Lenny Venito, Joseph Siravo, Jonathan Kimmel, Eddie Gossling, Kevin Michael Richardson, Chris Edgerly, Bob Joles, Greg Berg, Bob Bergen, Debi Derryberry, Eddie Frierson, Jess Harnell, Jason Harris Katz, Josh Keaton, Carolyn Lawrence, Danny Mann, Mona Marshall, Paul Pape, Fred Tatasciore, Kari Wahlgren, John Du Prez, Eric Idle, Miss Coco Peru, Dominic Scott Kay, Miles Marsico, Christian Argueta, David Cowgill, Jason Connroy, Terri Douglas, Jeannie Elias	
A P R I L	21	American Dreamz	Universal Pictures	Paul Weitz (director/screenplay); Hugh Grant, Dennis Quaid, Marcia Gay Harden, Willem Dafoe, Mandy Moore, Sam Golzari, Chris Klein, Jennifer Coolidge, Seth Meyers, Tony Yalda, Noureen DeWulf, Shohreh Aghdashloo, Judy Greer, John Cho, Adam Busch, Jeff Ross, Bernard White, Jay Harik, Haaz Sleiman, Lisa K. Wyatt, Beau Holden, Marley Shelton, Lawrence Pressman, Aldis Hodge, Christianne Klein, Chao-Li Chi, Andrew Divoff, James Gleason, Michael D. Roberts, Sarah Culberson, Perrey Reeves, Carmen Electra, Kevin Makely, Jeffrey Ross, Adrian Zaw	
A P R I L	21	The Sentinel	20th Century Fox / Regency Enterprises	Clark Johnson (director); George Nolfi (screenplay); Michael Douglas, Kiefer Sutherland, Eva Longoria, Martin Donovan, Kim Basinger, David Rasche, Ritchie Coster, Blair Brown, Nancy Ajram, Kristin Lehman, Raynor Scheine, Chuck Shamata, Paul Calderón, Clark Johnson, Raoul Bhaneja, Yanna McIntosh, Jasmin Geljo, Gloria Reuben, Joshua Peace, Simon Reynolds, Geza Kovacs, Danny A. Gonzales, Jude Coffey	
A P R I L	25	Dr. Dolittle 3	20th Century Fox Home Entertainment / Davis Entertainment	Rich Thorne (director); Nina Colman (screenplay); Kyla Pratt, Kristen Wilson, John Amos, Luciana Carro, Calum Worthy, John Novak, Chelan Simmons, Ecstasia Sanders, O'Ryan Browner, Beverley Breuer, Gary Jones, Carly McKillip, Emily Tennant, Alistair Abell, Peter Kelamis, Louis Chirillo, Norm Macdonald, Danny Bonaduce, Gary Busey, Paulo Costanzo, Chris Edgerly, Eli Gabay, Vanessa Marshall, Mark Moseley, Jenna von Oÿ, Phil Proctor, Maggie Wheeler, Susan Silo, Melanie Chartoff, Porscha Coleman, Walker Howard, Tommy Snider, Ryan McDonell, Chenier Hundal, Tara Wilson, James Kirk, Neil Schell	
A P R I L	28	Akeelah and the Bee	Lionsgate / 2929 Entertainment / Starbucks Entertainment	Doug Atchison (director/screenplay); Keke Palmer, Laurence Fishburne, Angela Bassett, Curtis Armstrong, J. R. Villarreal, Sean Michael Afable, Erica Hubbard, Lee Thompson Young, Sahara Garey, Julito McCullum, Dalia Phillips, Eddie Steeples, Tzi Ma, Wolfgang Bodison	
A P R I L	28	Killer Diller	Freestyle Releasing / Sprocketdyne Entertainment	Tricia Brock (director/screenplay); William Lee Scott, Lucas Black, Fred Willard, John Michael Higgins, W. Earl Brown, Taj Mahal, Mary Kay Place, Robert Ray Wisdom, Ashley Johnson, Niki J. Crawford, RonReaco Lee, Lawrence Lowe, Jared Tyler, Davenia McFadden, Matt Clark, Clyde Edgerton, Bonnie Root, David Shatraw	
A P R I L	28	RV	Columbia Pictures / Relativity Media / Red Wagon Entertainment / Intermedia Films	Barry Sonnenfeld (director); Geoff Rodkey (screenplay); Robin Williams, Cheryl Hines, Josh Hutcherson, Joanna "JoJo" Levesque, Jeff Daniels, Kristin Chenoweth, Hunter Parrish, Alex Ferris, Will Arnett, Brendan Fletcher, Brian Markinson, Tony Hale, Brian Howe, Richard Cox, Matthew Gray Gubler, Ty Olsson, Barry Sonnenfeld, Diane Michelle, Chloe Sonnenfeld, Rob LaBelle, Veronika Sztopa, Kirsten Alter, Malcolm Scott, Bruce McFee	
A P R I L	28	Stick It	Touchstone Pictures / Spyglass Entertainment	Jessica Bendinger (director/screenplay); Missy Peregrym, Jeff Bridges, Vanessa Lengies, Maddy Curley, Nikki SooHoo, Kellan Lutz, John Patrick Amedori, Tarah Paige, Jon Gries, Gia Carides, John Kapelos, Julie Warner, Andrea Bendewald, Tim Daggett, Elfi Schlegel, Bart Conner, Carly Patterson, Nastia Liukin, Valeri Liukin, Mohini Bhardwaj, Allana Slater, Yang Yun	
A P R I L	28	United 93	Universal Pictures / Working Title Films	Paul Greengrass (director/screenplay); Christian Clemenson, Cheyenne Jackson, David Alan Basche, Peter Hermann, Corey Johnson, Richard Bekins, Michael J. Reynolds, Khalid Abdalla, David Rasche, Rebecca Schull, Denny Dillon, Lewis Alsamari, Jamie Harding, Omar Berdouni, Chip Zien, Erich Redman, Kate Jennings Grant, Trieste Kelly Dunn, Marceline Hugot, John Rothman, Libby Morris, Susan Blommaert, Liza Colón-Zayas, Olivia Thirlby, Leigh Zimmerman, Patrick St. Esprit, Gregg Henry, Ben Sliney	
M A Y	5	An American Haunting	Freestyle Releasing / After Dark Films / Remstar	Courtney Solomon (director/screenplay); Donald Sutherland, Sissy Spacek, James D'Arcy, Rachel Hurd-Wood, Matthew Marsh, Miquel Brown, Shauna Shim, Thom Fell, Zoe Thorne, Gaye Brown, Sam Alexander	
M A Y	5	Art School Confidential	Sony Pictures Classics / United Artists	Terry Zwigoff (director); Daniel Clowes (screenplay); Max Minghella, Sophia Myles, John Malkovich, Anjelica Huston, Jim Broadbent, Matt Keeslar, Ethan Suplee, Joel David Moore, Nick Swardson, Adam Scott, Ezra Buzzington, Katherine Moennig, Bob Golub, Scoot McNairy, Steve Buscemi, Ozman Sirgood, Charlie Talbert, Brian Geraghty, Michael Shamus Wiles, Shelly Cole, Jack Ong, Lauren Lee Smith, Paul Collins, Marshall Bell, Chris L. McKenna, Marc Vann, Roxanne Hart, Katija Pevec, Michael Lerner, Dick Bakalyan, John Bliss, Lauren Bowles, Valyn Hall, Dawn-Lyen Gardner, Stacey Travis, Todd Bosley, Ethan Cohn	
M A Y	5	Down in the Valley	THINKFilm	David Jacobson (director/screenplay); Edward Norton, Evan Rachel Wood, David Morse, Rory Culkin, Bruce Dern, John Diehl, Geoffrey Lewis, Artel Kayàru, Elizabeth Peña, Kat Dennings, Hunter Parrish, Aviva Farber, Aaron Fors, Terrence Evans, Ty Burrell	
M A Y	5	Hoot	New Line Cinema / Walden Media	Wil Shriner (director/screenplay); Logan Lerman, Brie Larson, Luke Wilson, Cody Linley, Tim Blake Nelson, Neil Flynn, Robert Wagner, Kiersten Warren, Clark Gregg, Jimmy Buffett, Jessica Cauffiel, Dean Collins, Robert Donner, Carl Hiaasen, Eric Phillips, Damaris Justamante	
M A Y	5	The King	THINKFilm / ContentFilm / FilmFour	James Marsh (director/screenplay); Milo Addica (screenplay); Gael García Bernal, Laura Harring, Paul Dano, Pell James, William Hurt, Marco Perella, Libby Villari, Derek Alvarado, Mohammad Ahmed, Milo Addica	
M A Y	5	Mission: Impossible III	Paramount Pictures / Cruise/Wagner Productions	J. J. Abrams (director/screenplay); Alex Kurtzman, Roberto Orci (screenplay); Tom Cruise, Philip Seymour Hoffman, Ving Rhames, Billy Crudup, Michelle Monaghan, Jonathan Rhys Meyers, Keri Russell, Maggie Q, Laurence Fishburne, Simon Pegg, Eddie Marsan, Bahar Soomekh, Jeff Chase, Michael Berry Jr., Carla Gallo, Bellamy Young, Jane Daly, Greg Grunberg, Sabra Williams, Rose Rollins, Sasha Alexander, Tracy Middendorf, Aaron Paul, Kathryn Fiore, Sean O'Bryan, Bruce French, Ellen Bry, Antonio Del Prete, Francesco De Vito, Paolo Bonacelli, Timothy Omundson, José Zúñiga, Michelle Arthur, Barney Cheng, George Cheung, Charles Rahi Chun, Alex Kurtzman, Dan Mindel, Roberto Orci, Lucille Soong	
M A Y	5	The Proposition	First Look International	John Hillcoat (director); Nick Cave (screenplay); Guy Pearce, Ray Winstone, Danny Huston, John Hurt, David Wenham, Emily Watson, Richard Wilson, Tom E. Lewis, Leah Purcell, Tom Budge, Robert Morgan, David Gulpilil, Noah Taylor, Oliver Ackland, Ralph Cotterill, Bogdan Koca, Gary Waddell, Mick Roughan, Shane Watt, Rodney Boschman, Bryan Probets	
M A Y	12	Just My Luck	20th Century Fox / Regency Enterprises / Cheyenne Enterprises / Silvercup Studios	Donald Petrie (director); I. Marlene King, Amy B. Harris, James Greer, Jonathan Bernstein (screenplay); Lindsay Lohan, Chris Pine, Faizon Love, Missi Pyle, Samaire Armstrong, Bree Turner, Makenzie Vega, Carlos Ponce, McFly, Tovah Feldshuh, Jaqueline Fleming, Chris Carmack, Dane Rhodes, J.C. Sealy, Rome Kanda, Jon Manfrellotti, Erik Liberman, Dean Cochran, Craig Castaldo, Kayla Ewell, Jim Ford, Lara Grice, Derrick Simmons	
M A Y	12	Poseidon	Warner Bros. Pictures / Virtual Studios	Wolfgang Petersen (director); Mark Protosevich (screenplay); Kurt Russell, Josh Lucas, Richard Dreyfuss, Jacinda Barrett, Emmy Rossum, Mike Vogel, Mia Maestro, Jimmy Bennett, Andre Braugher, Kevin Dillon, Stacy Ferguson, Freddy Rodriguez, Kirk B.R. Woller, Kelly McNair, Gabriel Jarret, David Reivers, Gordon Thomson, Jan Munroe, Caroline Lagerfelt, Valerie Azlynn, Vincent De Paul	
M A Y	19	12 and Holding	IFC Films / Serenade Films	Michael Cuesta (director); Anthony Cipriano (screenplay); Conor Donovan, Jesse Camacho, Zoe Weizenbaum, Jeremy Renner, Annabella Sciorra, Jayne Atkinson, Linus Roache, Tom McGowan, Adam LeFevre, Bruce Altman, Mark Linn-Baker, Tony Roberts, Marcella Lowery, Jodie Markell, Bianca Ryan, Merritt Wever, Marcia DeBonis, Michael C. Fuchs, Martin Campetta	
M A Y	19	The Da Vinci Code	Columbia Pictures / Imagine Entertainment / Skylark Productions	Ron Howard (director); Akiva Goldsman (screenplay); Tom Hanks, Audrey Tautou, Ian McKellen, Alfred Molina, Jürgen Prochnow, Jean Reno, Paul Bettany, Étienne Chicot, Jean-Yves Berteloot, Jean-Pierre Marielle, Charlotte Graham, Seth Gabel, Marie-Françoise Audollent, Francesco Carnelutti, Denis Podalydès, Hugh Mitchell, Dan Brown, Lynn Picknett, Ranaich Dunnett, Clive Prince	
M A Y	19	Over the Hedge	Paramount Pictures / DreamWorks Animation	Tim Johnson, Karey Kirkpatrick (directors); Len Blum, Lorne Cameron, David Hoselton, Karey Kirkpatrick (screenplay); Bruce Willis, Garry Shandling, Steve Carell, Wanda Sykes, Eugene Levy, Catherine O'Hara, William Shatner, Avril Lavigne, Nick Nolte, Thomas Haden Church, Allison Janney, Omid Djalili, Shane Baumel, Sami Kirkpatrick, Madison Davenport, Brian Stepanek, Lee Bienstock, Sean Yazbeck, Jessica Di Cicco, Debra Wilson, Paul Butcher, Joel McCrary, Kirk Baily, Jessie Flower, Michelle Ruff, Nicholas Guest, Bridget Hoffman, Marcelo Tubert, Ariel Winter, BoA	
M A Y	19	See No Evil	Lionsgate / WWE Studios	Gregory Dark (director); Dan Madigan (screenplay); Kane, Samantha Noble, Christina Vidal, Michael J. Pagan, Rachael Taylor, Penny McNamee, Craig Horner, Luke Pegler, Steven Vidler, Cecily Polson, Corey Parker Robinson, Zoe Ventoura, Mikhail Wilder, Tiffany Lamb, Sam Cotton, Annalise Woods	
M A Y	24	An Inconvenient Truth	Paramount Classics / Lawrence Bender Productions / Participant Productions	Davis Guggenheim (director); Al Gore (screenplay); Al Gore	
M A Y	26	X-Men: The Last Stand	20th Century Fox / Marvel Entertainment / Dune Entertainment / The Donners' Company	Brett Ratner (director); Simon Kinberg, Zak Penn (screenplay); Hugh Jackman, Halle Berry, Ian McKellen, Patrick Stewart, Famke Janssen, Kelsey Grammer, Anna Paquin, James Marsden, Rebecca Romijn, Shawn Ashmore, Vinnie Jones, Elliot Page, Aaron Stanford, Shohreh Aghdashloo, Ben Foster, Daniel Cudmore, Michael Murphy, Dania Ramirez, Josef Sommer, Bill Duke, Eric Dane, Haley Ramm, Cayden Boyd, Anthony Heald, Cameron Bright, Connor Widdows, Julian Richings, Ken Leung, Julian D. Christopher, Makenzie Vega, Mi-Jung Lee, Benita Ha, R. Lee Ermey, Lance Gibson, Chelah Horsdal, John Pyper-Ferguson, Mark Helfrich, Olivia Williams, Stan Lee, Chris Claremont, Omahyra Mota, Via Saleaumua, Richard Yee, Clayton Dean Watmough, Shauna Kain, Kea Wong, Adrian Hough, Lloyd Adams, Bryce Hodgson	
J U N E	2	The Break-Up	Universal Pictures	Peyton Reed (director); Jeremy Garelick, Jay Lavender (screenplay); Vince Vaughn, Jennifer Aniston, Joey Lauren Adams, Ann-Margret, Judy Davis, Vincent D'Onofrio, Jon Favreau, Cole Hauser, Keir O'Donnell, John Michael Higgins, Justin Long, Jason Bateman, Ivan Sergei, Peter Billingsley, Mary-Pat Green, Geoff Stults, Rebecca Spence, Old 97's, Linda Cohn, Zack Shada	
J U N E	2	Peaceful Warrior	Lionsgate / DEJ Productions	Victor Salva (director); Kevin Bernhardt (screenplay); Nick Nolte, Scott Mechlowicz, Amy Smart, Tim DeKay, Ashton Holmes, Paul Wesley, B.J. Britt, Agnes Bruckner, Beatrice Rosen, Ray Wise, Scott "Jesic" Caudill, Bart Conner, Steve Talley, Rob Moran	
J U N E	2	The Puffy Chair	Roadside Attractions / Red Envelope Entertainment / Duplass Brothers Productions	Jay Duplass, Mark Duplass (directors/screenplay); Mark Duplass, Katie Aselton, Rhett Wilkins, Julie Fischer, Larry Duplass, Cindy Duplass, Jim Whalen	
J U N E	6	The Omen	20th Century Fox	John Moore (director); David Seltzer (screenplay); Julia Stiles, Liev Schreiber, Mia Farrow, David Thewlis, Pete Postlethwaite, Michael Gambon, Seamus Davey-Fitzpatrick, Giovanni Lombardo Radice, Pedja Bjelac, Carlo Sabatini, Reggie Austin, Janet Henfrey, Nikki Amuka-Bird, MyAnna Buring, Harvey Stephens	
J U N E	9	Cars	Walt Disney Pictures / Pixar Animation Studios	John Lasseter (director/screenplay); Dan Fogelman, Joe Ranft, Jorgen Klubien, Kiel Murray, Phil Lorin (screenplay); Owen Wilson, Paul Newman, Bonnie Hunt, Larry the Cable Guy, Tony Shalhoub, Cheech Marin, Jenifer Lewis, George Carlin, Paul Dooley, Michael Keaton, John Ratzenberger, Jeremy Piven, Jay Leno, Tom and Ray Magliozzi, Mario Andretti, Richard Kind, Edie McClurg, Michael Schumacher, Dale Earnhardt Jr., Tom Hanks, Tim Allen, Billy Crystal, John Goodman, Dave Foley, Joe Ranft, Bob Costas, Darrell Waltrip, Jeremy Piven, Lynda Petty, Michael Wallis, Guido Quaroni, Richard Petty, Katherine Helmond, Humpy Wheeler, Lindsey Collins, Elissa Knight, Sarah Clark, Jonas Rivera, E.J. Holowicki, Adrian Ochoa, Lou Romano, Jack Angel, Michael Bell, Bob Bergen, Susan Blu, Rodger Bumpass, John Cygan, Jennifer Darling, Paul Eiding, Bill Farmer, Brian Fee, Teresa Ganzel, Jess Harnell, Artie Kempner, Sherry Lynn, Danny Mann, Laraine Newman, Teddy Newton, Colleen O'Shaughnessey, Bob Peterson, Steve Purcell, Jan Rabson, A.J. Riebli, Dan Scanlon, Stephen Schaffer, Ken Schretzmann, Jim Ward	
J U N E	9	A Prairie Home Companion	Picturehouse	Robert Altman (director); Garrison Keillor (screenplay); Woody Harrelson, Tommy Lee Jones, Garrison Keillor, Kevin Kline, Lindsay Lohan, Virginia Madsen, John C. Reilly, Maya Rudolph, Meryl Streep, Lily Tomlin, Marylouise Burke, L.Q. Jones, Tim Russell, Tom Keith, Sue Scott, Robin and Linda Williams, Jearlyn Steele, Bruce Bohne, Matthew Feeney, Jim Westcott, Punnavith Koy	
J U N E	16	The Fast and the Furious: Tokyo Drift	Universal Pictures / Relativity Media	Justin Lin (director); Chris Morgan (screenplay); Lucas Black, Nathalie Kelley, Sung Kang, Bow Wow, Brian Tee, Leonardo Nam, Brian Goodman, Zachery Ty Bryan, Sonny Chiba, Lynda Boyd, Jason Tobin, Keiko Kitagawa, Nikki Griffin, Satoshi Tsumabuki, Keiichi Tsuchiya, Kazutoshi Wadakura, Daniel Booko, Amber Stevens, Vincent Laresca, Yoko Maki, Kaila Yu, Caroline Correa, Silvia Šuvadová, Vin Diesel, Chrissy Teigen	
J U N E	16	Garfield: A Tail of Two Kitties	20th Century Fox / Davis Entertainment	Tim Hill (director); Joel Cohen, Alec Sokolow (screenplay); Bill Murray, Breckin Meyer, Jennifer Love Hewitt, Tim Curry, Billy Connolly, Ian Abercrombie, Bob Hoskins, Rhys Ifans, Vinnie Jones, Jim Piddock, Roger Rees, Lucy Davis, Jane Carr, Oliver Muirhead, Ben Falcone, JB Blanc, Vernee Watson Johnson, Judi Shekoni, Joe Pasquale, Greg Ellis, Richard E. Grant, Sharon Osbourne, Jane Leeves, Jane Horrocks, Roscoe Lee Browne, Neil Dickson, Robin Atkin Downes, Jean Gilpin, Justin Moran Shenkarow	
J U N E	16	Nacho Libre	Paramount Pictures / Nickelodeon Movies	Jared Hess (director/screenplay); Jerusha Hess, Mike White (screenplay); Jack Black, Ana de la Reguera, Hector Jimenez, Peter Stormare, Carla Jimenez, Richard Montoya, Moisés Arias, Silver King, Diego Eduardo Gomez, Human Tornado, Mascarita Dorada, Troy Gentile, Enrique Muñoz, Donald Chambers, Darius Rose	
J U N E	16	The Lake House	Warner Bros. Pictures / Village Roadshow Pictures	Alejandro Agresti (director); David Auburn (screenplay); Keanu Reeves, Sandra Bullock, Dylan Walsh, Shohreh Aghdashloo, Christopher Plummer, Ebon Moss-Bachrach, Willeke van Ammelrooy, Lynn Collins, Mike Bacarella, Frank Caeti, Cynthia Kaye McWilliams, Mia Park, Jason Wells	
J U N E	16	Loverboy	THINKFilm / Screen Media Films	Kevin Bacon (director); Hannah Shakespeare (screenplay); Kyra Sedgwick, Kevin Bacon, Blair Brown, Sandra Bullock, Matt Dillon, Oliver Platt, Campbell Scott, Marisa Tomei, Dominic Scott Kay, Melissa Errico, Sosie Bacon, Travis Bacon, Nancy Giles, Carolyn McCormick, Naelee Rae, John Legend, Robert Sedgwick, Spencer Treat Clark, Valyn Hall	
J U N E	23	Click	Columbia Pictures / Revolution Studios / Happy Madison Productions	Frank Coraci (director); Steve Koren, Mark O'Keefe (screenplay); Adam Sandler, Kate Beckinsale, Christopher Walken, Henry Winkler, David Hasselhoff, Julie Kavner, Sean Astin, Joseph Castanon, Jonah Hill, Jake Hoffman, Danielle Tatum McCann, Lorraine Nicholson, Katie Cassidy, Cameron Monaghan, Jennifer Coolidge, Rachel Dratch, Sophie Monk, Michelle Lombardo, Jana Kramer, Nick Swardson, Sid Ganis, Michael Yama, Frank Coraci, Tim Herlihy, Carolyn Hennesy, Sally Insul, Blake Clark, Rob Schneider, James Earl Jones, Terry Crews, Dolores O'Riordan, Billy Slaughter	
J U N E	23	Waist Deep	Rogue Pictures / Intrepid Pictures	Vondie Curtis-Hall (director/screenplay); Darin Scott (screenplay); Tyrese Gibson, Meagan Good, Larenz Tate, Kimora Lee Simmons, The Game, Henry Hunter Hall, Darris Love, Julius Denem, Arnold Vosloo, Kasi Lemmons, Poverty, Yolanda "Yo-Yo" Whitaker, Michael Eric Dyson, Thomas Abate	
J U N E	27	Leroy & Stitch	Walt Disney Home Entertainment / Walt Disney Pictures / Walt Disney Television Animation	Tony Craig (director); Bobs Gannaway (director/screenplay); Jess Winfield (screenplay); Chris Sanders, Daveigh Chase, Tia Carrere, David Ogden Stiers, Kevin McDonald, Kevin Michael Richardson, Jeff Bennett, Rob Paulsen, Zoe Caldwell, Ving Rhames, Liliana Mumy, Tara Strong, Frank Welker, Tress MacNeille, Nancy Cartwright, Bobcat Goldthwait, Kali Whitehurst, Doug Stone, Rocky McMurray, Lili Ishida, Jillian Henry, Debra Rogers	
J U N E	28	Strangers with Candy	THINKFilm / Comedy Central Films / Worldwide Pants / Roberts/David Films	Paul Dinello (director/screenplay); Stephen Colbert, Amy Sedaris (screenplay); Amy Sedaris, Stephen Colbert, Paul Dinello, Dan Hedaya, Joseph Cross, Deborah Rush, Maria Thayer, Carlo Alban, Gregory Hollimon, Allison Janney, Matthew Broderick, Sarah Jessica Parker, Philip Seymour Hoffman, Justin Theroux, Chris Pratt, Delores Duffy, Kristen Johnston, David Pasquesi, Ian Holm, David Rakoff, Elisabeth Harnois, Alexis Dziena, Thomas Guiry, Evelyn McGee, Chandra Wilson, Ivette Diaz Dumeng, Cal Robertson, Callie Thorne, Sarah Thyre, Jonah Bobo, Ryan Donowho, Christopher Larkin, Todd Oldham	
J U N E	28	Superman Returns	Warner Bros. Pictures / Legendary Pictures / DC Comics / Peters Entertainment	Bryan Singer (director); Michael Dougherty, Dan Harris (screenplay); Brandon Routh, Kate Bosworth, Kevin Spacey, James Marsden, Parker Posey, Frank Langella, Eva Marie Saint, Kal Penn, Sam Huntington, Tristan Lake Leabu, Marlon Brando, Peta Wilson, Jack Larson, Noel Neill, Richard Branson, Ian Roberts, Jeff Truman, Barbara Angell, Ian Bliss, Michael Dougherty, Dan Harris, David Fabrizio, Vincent Stone	
J U N E	30	The Devil Wears Prada	20th Century Fox / Fox 2000 Pictures	David Frankel (director); Aline Brosh McKenna (screenplay); Meryl Streep, Anne Hathaway, Emily Blunt, Stanley Tucci, Simon Baker, Adrian Grenier, Gisele Bündchen, Tracie Thoms, Rich Sommer, Daniel Sunjata, James Naughton, David Marshall Grant, Tibor Feldman, Rebecca Mader, Jimena Hoyos, George C. Wolfe, John Rothman, Alyssa Sutherland, Ines Rivero, Stéphanie Szostak, Valentino Garavani, Giancarlo Giammetti, Bridget Hall, Lauren Weisberger, Robert Verdi, Heidi Klum, Jen Taylor, Nigel Barker, Donatella Versace, Colleen Dengel, Suzanne Dengel, David Callegati, Carlos de Souza	

== July–September ==
Opening		Title	Production company	Cast and crew	Ref.
J U L Y	7	Pirates of the Caribbean: Dead Man's Chest	Walt Disney Pictures / Jerry Bruckheimer Films	Gore Verbinski (director); Ted Elliott, Terry Rossio (screenplay); Johnny Depp, Orlando Bloom, Keira Knightley, Jack Davenport, Stellan Skarsgård, Bill Nighy, Naomie Harris, Kevin McNally, Lee Arenberg, Mackenzie Crook, Tom Hollander, Geoffrey Rush, Jonathan Pryce, David Bailie, Martin Klebba, Alex Norton, David Schofield, John Boswall, Derrick O'Connor, Clive Ashborn, Robbie Gee, Christopher Adamson, Andy Beckwith, Jonathan Linsley, Luke de Woolfson, Israel Aduramo, Steve Speirs, Vanessa Branch, David Sterne, Barry McEvoy, Michael Enright, Marco Khan, David Zahedian, Reggie Lee, Samantha Hanratty, James S. Levine, San Sheila, Lauren Maher, Dermot Keaney, Winston Ellis	
J U L Y	7	A Scanner Darkly	Warner Independent Pictures / Thousand Words / Section Eight / Detour Filmproduction / 3 Arts Entertainment	Richard Linklater (director/screenplay); Keanu Reeves, Robert Downey Jr., Woody Harrelson, Winona Ryder, Rory Cochrane, Lisa Marie Newmyer, Dameon Clarke, Jason Douglas, Marco Perella, Alex Jones, Turk Pipkin	
J U L Y	14	Little Man	Columbia Pictures / Revolution Studios	Keenen Ivory Wayans (director/screenplay); Marlon Wayans, Shawn Wayans (screenplay); Marlon Wayans, Shawn Wayans, Kerry Washington, John Witherspoon, Tracy Morgan, Chazz Palminteri, Molly Shannon, Lochlyn Munro, David Alan Grier, Dave Sheridan, Brittany Daniel, Linden Porco, John DeSantis, Fred Stoller, Alex Borstein, Kelly Coffield Park, Damien Dante Wayans, Gary Owen, Chris Gauthier, Rob Schneider, Gabriel Pimental, Reece Knight, Chloe Matthews, Matthew Ast	
J U L Y	14	You, Me and Dupree	Universal Pictures	Anthony Russo, Joe Russo (directors); Michael LeSieur (screenplay); Owen Wilson, Kate Hudson, Matt Dillon, Michael Douglas, Seth Rogen, Amanda Detmer, Todd Stashwick, Bill Hader, Lance Armstrong, Jason Winer, Sidney S. Liufau, Billy Gardell, Summer Altice, Joe Russo, Fenessa Pineda, Pat Crawford Brown, Michelle Lee, Tasha Smith, Harry Dean Stanton	
J U L Y	21	Clerks II	Metro-Goldwyn-Mayer / The Weinstein Company / View Askew Productions	Kevin Smith (director/screenplay); Brian O'Halloran, Jeff Anderson, Rosario Dawson, Trevor Fehrman, Jason Mewes, Kevin Smith, Jennifer Schwalbach Smith, Jason Lee, Zak Knutson, Wanda Sykes, Earthquake, Ethan Suplee, Ben Affleck, Kevin Weisman, Scott Mosier, Walt Flanagan, Jake Richardson, Harley Quinn Smith, Kevin Michael Richardson, Anthony Marciona, Kenny Wormald, Nancy O'Meara	
J U L Y	21	Lady in the Water	Warner Bros. Pictures / Legendary Pictures / Blinding Edge Pictures	M. Night Shyamalan (director/screenplay); Paul Giamatti, Bryce Dallas Howard, Bob Balaban, Jeffrey Wright, Sarita Choudhury, Cindy Cheung, Freddy Rodriguez, Bill Irwin, Jared Harris, Mary Beth Hurt, Joseph D. Reitman, Tovah Feldshuh, M. Night Shyamalan, Noah Gray-Cabey, John Boyd, Ethan Cohn, June Kyoto Lu, Tom Mardirosian, Carla Jimenez, Monique Gabriela Curnen, Kevin Frank, Jeremy Howard, Brian Steele, Doug Jones, David Ogden Stiers	
J U L Y	21	Monster House	Columbia Pictures / Relativity Media / ImageMovers / Amblin Entertainment	Gil Kenan (director); Dan Harmon, Rob Schrab, Pamela Pettler (screenplay); Mitchel Musso, Sam Lerner, Spencer Locke, Steve Buscemi, Nick Cannon, Maggie Gyllenhaal, Kevin James, Jason Lee, Catherine O'Hara, Kathleen Turner, Fred Willard, Jon Heder, Ryan Whitney, Brittany Curran	
J U L Y	21	My Super Ex-Girlfriend	20th Century Fox / Regency Enterprises	Ivan Reitman (director); Don Payne (screenplay); Uma Thurman, Luke Wilson, Anna Faris, Eddie Izzard, Rainn Wilson, Wanda Sykes, Stelio Savante, Mike Iorio, Mark Consuelos, Margaret Anne Florence, Catherine Reitman, Richie Rich, Juliana Harkavy	
J U L Y	26	Little Miss Sunshine	Fox Searchlight Pictures / Big Beach / Deep River Productions	Jonathan Dayton, Valerie Faris (directors); Michael Arndt (screenplay); Greg Kinnear, Steve Carell, Toni Collette, Paul Dano, Abigail Breslin, Alan Arkin, Bryan Cranston, Beth Grant, Wallace Langham, Matt Winston, Julio Oscar Mechoso, Paula Newsome, Dean Norris, Mary Lynn Rajskub, Marc Turtletaub, Jill Talley, Gordon Thomson, Steven Christopher Parker, Mel Rodriguez, Regis Philbin	
J U L Y	28	The Ant Bully	Warner Bros. Pictures / Legendary Pictures / Playtone / DNA Productions	John A. Davis (director/screenplay); Zach Tyler Eisen, Julia Roberts, Nicolas Cage, Meryl Streep, Paul Giamatti, Regina King, Bruce Campbell, Lily Tomlin, Cheri Oteri, Ricardo Montalbán, Rob Paulsen, S. Scott Bullock, Mark DeCarlo, Larry Miller, Allison Mack, Jake T. Austin, Richard Green, Don Frye, Tyler James Williams, Jake Goldberg, Tom Kenny, Neil Ross, Bob Joles, Wally Wingert, Clive Robertson, Susan Silo, Zack Shada, Max Burkholder, Candi Milo, Nika Futterman, Colin Ford, Nicole Sullivan, Pat Fraley, Paul Greenberg, David Kaye, Creagen Dow, Myles Jeffrey, Frank Welker, Denzel Whitaker, Keith Alcorn, John A. Davis, Paul Rugg, Larry Cedar, Shane Baumel, Tress MacNeille, Vernee Watson Johnson, Michaela Jill Murphy, Fred Tatasciore	
J U L Y	28	John Tucker Must Die	20th Century Fox	Betty Thomas (director); Jeff Lowell (screenplay); Jesse Metcalfe, Brittany Snow, Ashanti, Sophia Bush, Arielle Kebbel, Penn Badgley, Jenny McCarthy, Fatso-Fasano, Patricia Drake, Taylor Kitsch, Kevin McNulty, Amber Borycki, Meghan Ory, Greg Cipes, Samantha McLeod, Nicole LaPlaca, Steve Bacic, Marc Menard, Brendan Penny, Chelan Simmons, Alfred E. Humphreys, Fulvio Cecere, Nicki Clyne, Connor Widdows, Amanda Crew, Emily Tennant, Archie Hahn, People in Planes, Angela Fong, Jessica Harmon, Heather McEwen	
J U L Y	28	Miami Vice	Universal Pictures	Michael Mann (director/screenplay); Colin Farrell, Jamie Foxx, Gong Li, Justin Theroux, Naomie Harris, Ciarán Hinds, Elizabeth Rodriguez, Domenick Lombardozzi, Barry Shabaka Henley, Luis Tosar, John Ortiz, Isaach De Bankolé, John Hawkes, Tom Towles, Eddie Marsan, Mario Ernesto Sánchez, Pasha D. Lychnikoff, Ana Cristina Oliveira, Oleg Taktarov, Tony Curran, Don Frye, Marc Macaulay, Mike Pniewski, Dexter Fletcher, Danny Pardo, Taso N. Stavrakis	
J U L Y	28	Scoop	Focus Features / BBC Films / Ingenious Film Partners	Woody Allen (director/screenplay); Woody Allen, Hugh Jackman, Scarlett Johansson, Ian McShane, Charles Dance, Romola Garai, Kevin R. McNally, Julian Glover, Victoria Hamilton, Fenella Woolgar, Geoff Bell, Alexander Armstrong, Anthony Stewart Head, Robert Bathurst, Christopher Fulford, Nigel Lindsay, Doreen Mantle, David Schneider, Meera Syal, Mark Heap, Matt Day, Elizabeth Berrington, Rupert Frazer, Christopher Godwin, Paula Wilcox, John Standing, Sanjeev Bhaskar, John Light, Caroline Blakiston, Richard Johnson, Rosie Cavaliero, Anthony O'Donnell, Lynda Baron, Phil Cornwell, Meg Wynn Owen, Julia Deakin, Margaret Tyzack, Jeffry Wickham, Toby Jones	
A U G U S T	4	Barnyard	Paramount Pictures / Nickelodeon Movies / O Entertainment	Steve Oedekerk (director/screenplay); Kevin James, Sam Elliott, Courteney Cox, Wanda Sykes, Danny Glover, Andie MacDowell, David Koechner, Jeffrey Garcia, Tino Insana, Cam Clarke, Rob Paulsen, Steve Oedekerk, John DiMaggio, Maurice LaMarche, Fred Tatasciore, Maria Bamford, Dom Irrera, S. Scott Bullock, Madeline Lovejoy, Earthquake, Jill Talley, Laraine Newman, Katie Leigh, Paul Butcher, Khamani Griffin, Liliana Mumy, Julianne Buescher, Leigh French, Eddie Frierson, Nika Futterman, Nicholas Guest, Archie Hahn, Phil Proctor, Justin Shenkarow, Lynne Marie Stewart, Audrey Wasilewski, Claudette Wells, North Mississippi Allstars	
A U G U S T	4	The Descent	Lionsgate	Neil Marshall (director/screenplay); Shauna Macdonald, Natalie Mendoza, Alex Reid, Saskia Mulder, MyAnna Buring, Nora-Jane Noone, Oliver Milburn, Molly Kayll, Craig Conway	
A U G U S T	4	The Night Listener	Miramax Films / IFC Films / Fortissimo Films	Patrick Stettner (director/screenplay); Armistead Maupin, Terry Anderson (screenplay); Robin Williams, Toni Collette, Rory Culkin, Bobby Cannavale, Sandra Oh, Joe Morton, John Cullum, Lisa Emery, Becky Ann Baker, Rodrigo Lopresti, Marcia Halfrecht, Billy Van, Marceline Hugot, Maryann Plunkett	
A U G U S T	4	Talladega Nights: The Ballad of Ricky Bobby	Columbia Pictures / Relativity Media / Apatow Productions / Mosaic Media Group	Adam McKay (director/screenplay); Will Ferrell (screenplay); Will Ferrell, John C. Reilly, Sacha Baron Cohen, Michael Clarke Duncan, Leslie Bibb, Gary Cole, Jane Lynch, Amy Adams, Andy Richter, Houston Tumlin, Grayson Russell, Adam McKay, David Koechner, Ian Roberts, Jack McBrayer, Pat Hingle, Greg Germann, Molly Shannon, Rob Riggle, Conrad Ricamora, Jim Wise, Dale Earnhardt Jr., Jamie McMurray, Mike Joy, Darrell Waltrip, Larry McReynolds, Dick Berggren, Bill Weber, Benny Parsons, Wally Dallenbach Jr., Elvis Costello, Mos Def, Bob Jenkins, Rick Benjamin, Jack Blessing, Greg Biffle, Frank Welker, Ed Lauter	
A U G U S T	9	World Trade Center	Paramount Pictures	Oliver Stone (director); Andrea Berloff (screenplay); Nicolas Cage, Maria Bello, Maggie Gyllenhaal, Michael Peña, Stephen Dorff, Jon Bernthal, Jay Hernandez, Michael Shannon, Donna Murphy, Frank Whaley, Jude Ciccolella, Danny Nucci, Brad William Henke, Peter McRobbie, Julie Adams, Nicholas Turturro, William Mapother, Tom Wright, Wass Stevens, Armando Riesco, Ned Eisenberg, Dara Coleman, Nick Damici, Connor Paolo, Arthur J. Nascarella, Patti D'Arbanville, Viola Davis, Will Jimeno, Aimee Mullins, Charles A. Gargano, Tawny Cypress, Robert Blanche, Nicky Katt, Kimberly Scott, Gregory Jbara, Dorothy Lyman, Tony Genaro, Jay Acovone, Thomas F. Duffy, Roger Cross, Jossara Jinaro, Gary Stretch, Kurt Caceres, S.A. Griffin, John C. McGinley, John McLoughlin, Stephen Rannazzisi	
A U G U S T	11	Half Nelson	THINKFilm	Ryan Fleck (director/screenplay); Anna Boden (screenplay); Ryan Gosling, Shareeka Epps, Anthony Mackie, Monique Gabriela Curnen, Denis O'Hare, Jeff Lima, Deborah Rush, Jay O. Sanders, Collins Pennie, Tina Holmes, Tristan Wilds, Erica Rivera, Ron Cephas Jones, Larry Rapp, Starla Benford, Nathan Corbett, Tyra Kwao-Vovo, Karen Chilton, David Easton, Nicole Vicius, Bryce Silver, Kaela C. Pabon, Stephanie Bast, Eleanor Hutchins, Sebastian Sozzi, Raymond Anthony Thomas, Christopher Williamson, Leslie Eva Glaser, Sharon Washington	
A U G U S T	11	Pulse	The Weinstein Company / Dimension Films / Distant Horizons	Jim Sonzero (director); Wes Craven, Ray Wright (screenplay); Kristen Bell, Ian Somerhalder, Christina Milian, Rick Gonzalez, Zach Grenier, Samm Levine, Octavia Spencer, Ron Rifkin, Jonathan Tucker, Joseph Gatt, Kel O'Neill, Riki Lindhome, Robert Clotworthy, Brad Dourif, Christine Barger, Steve Tom	
A U G U S T	11	Step Up	Touchstone Pictures / Summit Entertainment / Offspring Entertainment	Anne Fletcher (director); Duane Adler, Melissa Rosenberg (screenplay); Channing Tatum, Jenna Dewan Tatum, Mario, Drew Sidora, Heavy D, Damaine Radcliff, De'Shawn Washington, Rachel Griffiths, Josh Henderson, Alyson Stoner, Deirdre Lovejoy, Jamie Scott, Ryan Sands, Anne Fletcher, Jeannie Ortega, Damien Escobar, Michael Seresin, Jamal Sims, Adam Shankman, Zachary Woodlee	
A U G U S T	11	Zoom	Columbia Pictures / Revolution Studios	Peter Hewitt (director); Adam Rifkin, David Berenbaum (screenplay); Tim Allen, Courteney Cox, Chevy Chase, Rip Torn, Spencer Breslin, Kevin Zegers, Michael Cassidy, Kate Mara, Ryan Newman, Alexis Bledel, Devon Aoki, Wilmer Valderrama, Cornelia Guest, Ridge Canipe, Danny McCarthy, Thomas F. Wilson, David L. Lander, Lauren Sánchez, Willie Garson, Jane Hajduk, Tommy Chang, Aaron Abrams, Matthew Wood	
A U G U S T	18	Accepted	Universal Pictures / Shady Acres Entertainment	Steve Pink (director); Adam Cooper, Bill Collage, Mark Perez (screenplay); Justin Long, Blake Lively, Anthony Heald, Jonah Hill, Lewis Black, Adam Herschman, Columbus Short, Maria Thayer, Mark Derwin, Ann Cusack, Hannah Marks, Robin Lord Taylor, Diora Baird, Joe Hursley, Jeremy Howard, Travis Van Winkle, Kaitlin Doubleday, Ross Patterson, Kellan Lutz, Skyler Stone, Lisa Gleave, Alejandra Gutierrez, Jim O'Heir, Carla Jimenez, Ned Schmidtke, Tim Bagley, Ray Santiago, Margaret Travolta, Scott Adsit, Steve Little, Kate French, Armen Weitzman, Greg Sestero, Sara Jean Underwood, Sam Horrigan, Artie Baxter, Brendan Miller, Darcy Shean	
A U G U S T	18	The Illusionist	Yari Film Group	Neil Burger (director/screenplay); Edward Norton, Paul Giamatti, Jessica Biel, Rufus Sewell, Eddie Marsan, Jake Wood, Tom Fisher, Aaron Johnson, Eleanor Tomlinson, Karl Johnson, Vincent Franklin, Nicholas Blane, Philip McGough, Erich Redman, Michael Carter	
A U G U S T	18	Material Girls	Metro-Goldwyn-Mayer / Maverick Films	Martha Coolidge (director); Jessica O'Toole, Amy Rardin, John Quaintance (screenplay); Hilary Duff, Haylie Duff, Anjelica Huston, Lukas Haas, María Conchita Alonso, Brent Spiner, Faith Prince, Marcus Coloma, Obba Babatundé, Reagan Dale Neis, Ty Hodges, Henry Cho, Misti Traya, Brandon Beemer, Colleen Camp, Judy Tenuta, Joanne Baron, Dot-Marie Jones, Philip Casnoff, Natalie Lander, Larry Poindexter, Carl Lewis, Timothy Davis-Reed, Anthony Crivello, Alejandro Rose-Garcia, Kayla Ewell, Terri Seymour, Suzanne Whang, Joel Madden, Benji Madden, Cheyenne Haynes, Christina Copeland, Dennis Lee Kelly, Tanya Alexander	
A U G U S T	18	Snakes on a Plane	New Line Cinema / Mutual Film Company	David R. Ellis (director); Sebastian Gutierrez, David J. Taylor, John Heffernan (screenplay); Samuel L. Jackson, Julianna Margulies, Nathan Phillips, Bobby Cannavale, Rachel Blanchard, Flex Alexander, Todd Louiso, Sunny Mabrey, Kenan Thompson, Lin Shaye, David Koechner, Terry Chen, Elsa Pataky, Tom Butler, Kevin McNulty, Taylor Kitsch, Byron Lawson, Emily Holmes, Tygh Runyan, Crystal Lowe, Agam Darshi, Paris Hilton, R. Kelly, Keith Dallas, Bruce James, Mark Houghton, Samantha McLeod	
A U G U S T	18	Trust the Man	Fox Searchlight Pictures	Bart Freundlich (director/screenplay); David Duchovny, Billy Crudup, Julianne Moore, Maggie Gyllenhaal, Eva Mendes, James LeGros, Garry Shandling, Ellen Barkin, Dagmara Domińczyk, Justin Bartha, Sterling K. Brown, Glenn Fitzgerald, David Greenspan, Paul Hecht, Jim Gaffigan, Jayne Houdyshell, Kate Jennings Grant, Brian Tarantina, Noelle Beck, Bob Balaban, Scott Sowers, Bart Freundlich	
A U G U S T	25	Beerfest	Warner Bros. Pictures / Legendary Pictures	Jay Chandrasekhar (director/screenplay); Kevin Heffernan, Steve Lemme, Paul Soter, Erik Stolhanske (screenplay); Jay Chandrasekhar, Kevin Heffernan, Steve Lemme, Paul Soter, Erik Stolhanske, Nat Faxon, Will Forte, Ralf Möller, Mo'Nique, Eric Christian Olsen, Jürgen Prochnow, Cloris Leachman, Donald Sutherland, Blanchard Ryan, Gunter Schlierkamp, M.C. Gainey, James Roday, Philippe Brenninkmeyer, Chauntal Lewis, Isaac Kappy, Owain Yeoman, Allan Graf, Steven Michael Quezada, Audrey Marie Anderson, Simona Fusco, Willie Nelson	
A U G U S T	25	How to Eat Fried Worms	New Line Cinema / Walden Media	Bob Dolman (director/screenplay); Luke Benward, Hallie Kate Eisenberg, Adam Hicks, Tom Cavanagh, Kimberly Williams-Paisley, Austin Rogers, Alexander Gould, Ryan Malgarini, Philip Daniel Bolden, Clint Howard, Ty Panitz, James Rebhorn, Nick Krause, Andrea Martin, Simone White, Andrew Gillingham, Blake Garrett, Alexander Agate, David Bewley, Karen Wacker	
A U G U S T	25	Idlewild	Universal Pictures / HBO Films / Mosaic Media Group	Bryan Barber (director/screenplay); André 3000, Big Boi, Paula Patton, Terrence Howard, Faizon Love, Malinda Williams, Cicely Tyson, Macy Gray, Ben Vereen, Bruce Bruce, Bill Nunn, Patti LaBelle, Ving Rhames, Jackie Long, Paula Jai Parker, Karen Dyer, Bobb'e J. Thompson, Fonzworth Bentley, Bryan Barber, Afemo Omilami, Stephanie Moseley, Debra Killings, Adesola Osakalumi, Danielle Polanco, Jason Samuels Smith, Patrick "Sleepy" Brown, John Norwood Fisher, Chloe Arnold, J. Lee	
A U G U S T	25	Invincible	Walt Disney Pictures	Ericson Core (director); Brad Gann (screenplay); Mark Wahlberg, Greg Kinnear, Elizabeth Banks, Kevin Conway, Michael Rispoli, Kirk Acevedo, Dov Davidoff, Michael Kelly, Stink Fisher, Michael Mulheren, Michael Nouri, Jack Kehler, Lola Glaudini, Paige Turco, Morgan Turner, Lynn Cohen, Randy Couture, Rick Reilly, Tony Luke Jr., Merrill Reese, Mike Quick, Earle Masciulli, GJ Crescione	
A U G U S T	29	Brother Bear 2	Walt Disney Home Entertainment / DisneyToon Studios	Ben Gluck (director); Rich Burns (screenplay); Patrick Dempsey, Mandy Moore, Jeremy Suarez, Rick Moranis, Dave Thomas, Andrea Martin, Catherine O'Hara, Wanda Sykes, Wendie Malick, Kathy Najimy, Michael Clarke Duncan, Jim Cummings, Jeff Bennett, Jessie Flower, Tress MacNeille, Jason Marsden, Bobb'e J. Thompson, Kad Merad	
S E P T E M B E R	1	Crank	Lionsgate / Lakeshore Entertainment / RadicalMedia	Mark Neveldine, Brian Taylor (directors/screenplay); Jason Statham, Amy Smart, Jose Pablo Cantillo, Efren Ramirez, Dwight Yoakam, Keone Young, Reno Wilson, Carlos Sanz, Sam Witwer, Jay Xcala, Chester Bennington, Glenn Howerton, Edi Gathegi, Valarie Rae Miller, Brian Swibel, Noel Gugliemi, Francis Capra, Jacki R. Chan	
S E P T E M B E R	1	Idiocracy	20th Century Fox	Mike Judge (director/screenplay); Etan Cohen (screenplay); Luke Wilson, Maya Rudolph, Dax Shepard, Terry Crews, David Herman, Justin Long, Andrew Wilson, Brad "Scarface" Jordan, Thomas Haden Church, Stephen Root, Sara Rue, Patrick Fischler, Darlene Hunt, Turk Pipkin, Greg Pitts	
S E P T E M B E R	1	The Wicker Man	Warner Bros. Pictures / Alcon Entertainment / Millennium Films / Saturn Films / Equity Pictures	Neil LaBute (director/screenplay); Nicolas Cage, Ellen Burstyn, Kate Beahan, Frances Conroy, Leelee Sobieski, Molly Parker, Diane Delano, Christine Willes, Aaron Eckhart, Matthew Walker, James Franco, Jason Ritter, Christa Campbell, Tania Saulnier, Anna Van Hooft, Monique Ganderton, Mary Black, Erika Shaye Gair, Michael Wiseman, David Purvis, Sophie Hough, Sam Velasquez, Xantha Radley	
S E P T E M B E R	2	The Namesake	Fox Searchlight Pictures	Mira Nair (director/screenplay); Sooni Taraporevala (screenplay); Kal Penn, Tabu, Irrfan Khan	
S E P T E M B E R	8	Broken Bridges	Paramount Classics / CMT Films	Steven Goldmann (director); Cherie Bennett, Jeff Gottesfeld (screenplay); Toby Keith, Kelly Preston, Lindsey Haun, Tess Harper, Burt Reynolds, Josh Henderson, Anna Maria Horsford, Brian F. Durkin, Daniel Newman, Katie Finneran, Rhoda Griffis, David de Vries, Donna Biscoe, Willie Nelson, BeBe Winans, Seth Chalmers, Sharon Blackwood, Steve Coulter, Ron Clinton Smith, David Dwyer	
S E P T E M B E R	8	The Covenant	Screen Gems / Lakeshore Entertainment	Renny Harlin (director); J. S. Cardone (screenplay); Steven Strait, Sebastian Stan, Laura Ramsey, Taylor Kitsch, Toby Hemingway, Jessica Lucas, Chace Crawford, Wendy Crewson, Stephen McHattie, Kenneth Welsh, Kyle Schmid, Sarah Smyth, Jon McLaren, Steven Crowder, Paul Hopkins, John Robinson, Jimmy Star	
S E P T E M B E R	8	Hollywoodland	Focus Features / Miramax Films / Back Lot Pictures	Allen Coulter (director); Paul Bernbaum (screenplay); Adrien Brody, Diane Lane, Ben Affleck, Bob Hoskins, Robin Tunney, Kathleen Robertson, Lois Smith, Larry Cedar, Caroline Dhavernas, Molly Parker, Zach Mills, Neil Crone, Seamus Dever, Gareth Williams, Ted Atherton, Diego Fuentes, Dash Mihok, Todd Grinnell, Jeffrey DeMunn, Jeff Teravainen, Brad William Henke, Tim Campbell, Joe Spano, Richard Fancy, Jason Spevack, Jody Jaress, Bill Lake, Natalie Krill, Charlie Lea, Kevin Hare, Veronica Watt	
S E P T E M B E R	15	The Black Dahlia	Universal Pictures / Millennium Films	Brian De Palma (director); Josh Friedman (screenplay); Josh Hartnett, Scarlett Johansson, Aaron Eckhart, Hilary Swank, Mia Kirshner, Mike Starr, Fiona Shaw, Patrick Fischler, James Otis, John Kavanagh, Rose McGowan, Troy Evans, Pepe Serna, Anthony Russell, Angus MacInnes, Rachel Miner, Richard Brake, Victor McGuire, Gregg Henry, Jemima Rooper, William Finley, Kevin Dunn, Mia Frye, Ian McNeice, Fatso-Fasano, Steve Eastin, k.d. lang, Brian De Palma	
S E P T E M B E R	15	Everyone's Hero	20th Century Fox / IDT Entertainment	Christopher Reeve, Daniel St. Pierre, Colin Brady (directors); Robert Kurtz, Jeff Hand (screenplay); Jake T. Austin, William H. Macy, Rob Reiner, Whoopi Goldberg, Raven-Symoné, Brian Dennehy, Mandy Patinkin, Robert Wagner, Forest Whitaker, Robin Williams, Dana Reeve, Richard Kind, Joe Torre, Ed Helms, Jason Harris, Matthew Labyorteaux, Charles Parnell, Cherise Booth, Ritchie Allen, Ray Iannicelli, Gideon Jacobs, Marcus Maurice, Amanda Parsons, Will Reeve, Ron Tippe, Conor White	
S E P T E M B E R	15	Gridiron Gang	Columbia Pictures / Relativity Media / Original Film	Phil Joanou (director); Jeff Maguire (screenplay); Dwayne "The Rock" Johnson, Xzibit, Kevin Dunn, Leon Rippy, L. Scott Caldwell, Jade Yorker, Mo McRae, Brandon Mychal Smith, Jurnee Smollett, Michael J. Pagan, Jamal Mixon, Omari Hardwick, Mary Mara, Brett Cullen, Michael Jace, Anna Maria Horsford, Dan Martin, Garrett M. Brown, Sonya Eddy, Jamie McShane, Allan Graf, Setu Taase, Trever O'Brien, David Thomas, James Earl, Danny Martinez, Six Reasons, Ambrit Millhouse, Joseph Raymond Lucero	
S E P T E M B E R	15	Haven	Freestyle Releasing / Haven Distribution	Frank E. Flowers (director/screenplay); Orlando Bloom, Zoë Saldaña, Victor Rasuk, Bill Paxton, Stephen Dillane, Anthony Mackie, Razaaq Adoti, Agnes Bruckner, Joy Bryant, Bobby Cannavale, Robert Ray Wisdom, Lee Ingleby, Sarah Carter, Caroline Goodall, Ky-Mani Marley, Jake Weber, Mpho Koaho, Santiago Cabrera, Rachel Miner, Peter O'Meara, Serena Scott Thomas	
S E P T E M B E R	15	Keeping Mum	THINKFilm / Summit Entertainment / Isle of Man Film / Azure Films / Tusk Productions	Niall Johnson (director/screenplay); Richard Russo (screenplay); Rowan Atkinson, Maggie Smith, Kristin Scott Thomas, Tamsin Egerton, Patrick Swayze, Emilia Fox, Liz Smith, James Booth, Murray McArthur, Rupert Simonian, Alex Macqueen, Roger Hammond, Toby Parkes, Patrick Monckton, Rowley Irlam, Vivienne Moore	
S E P T E M B E R	15	The Last Kiss	DreamWorks Pictures / Lakeshore Entertainment	Tony Goldwyn (director); Zach Braff, Paul Haggis (screenplay); Zach Braff, Jacinda Barrett, Casey Affleck, Rachel Bilson, Blythe Danner, Tom Wilkinson, Michael Weston, Eric Christian Olsen, Harold Ramis, Marley Shelton, Lauren Lee Smith, Cindy Sampson, Lisa Mackay, Danny Wells	
S E P T E M B E R	22	All the King's Men	Columbia Pictures / Relativity Media / Phoenix Pictures	Steven Zaillian (director/screenplay); Sean Penn, Jude Law, Kate Winslet, James Gandolfini, Mark Ruffalo, Patricia Clarkson, Anthony Hopkins, Kathy Baker, Jackie Earle Haley, Talia Balsam, Travis M. Champagne, Frederic Forrest, Kevin Dunn, Tom McCarthy, Glenn Morshower, Jay Patterson, Michael Cavanaugh, Caroline Lagerfelt, Nicole Bobek, Tom Aldredge, Lenka Peterson, Eileen Ryan, Gary Grubbs, Keb' Mo', Azure Parsons	
S E P T E M B E R	22	Bandidas	20th Century Fox / EuropaCorp / Canal+	Joachim Rønning, Espen Sandberg (directors); Luc Besson, Robert Mark Kamen (screenplay); Salma Hayek, Penélope Cruz, Steve Zahn, Dwight Yoakam, Sam Shepard, Denis Arndt, Ismael 'East' Carlo, Edgar Vivar, Ernesto Gómez Cruz, Humberto Elizondo, Ana Ofelia Murguía, Joseph D. Reitman, Ricardo Arjona, José María Negri, Audra Blaser, Gary Carlos Cervantes, Lenny Zundel, Filiberto Estrella, Yomo Tlazotlally	
S E P T E M B E R	22	Jet Li's Fearless	Rogue Pictures	Ronny Yu (director); Chris Chow, Christine To, Wang Bin, Li Feng (screenplay); Jet Li, Nakamura Shidō II, Sun Li, Dong Yong, Nathan Jones, Collin Chou, Masato Harada, Chen Zhihui, Jacky Heung, Betty Sun, Paw Hee-ching, Mike Leeder, Anthony De Longis, Jean-Claude Leuyer, John T. Benn, John Hensley, Hu Xiaoling, He Sirong, Ma Yin, Ting Leung, Qu Yun, Ma Zhongxuan, Zhao Zhonggang, Zheng Shiming, Chen Fusheng, Wang Qi, He Jun, Liu Licheng, Qian Yi	
S E P T E M B E R	22	Flyboys	Metro-Goldwyn-Mayer / Ingenious Film Partners / Electric Entertainment	Tony Bill (director); David S. Ward, Phil Sears, Blake T. Evans (screenplay); James Franco, Martin Henderson, Jean Reno, Jennifer Decker, Abdul Salis, Philip Winchester, Tyler Labine, David Ellison, Tim Pigott-Smith, Mac McDonald, Todd Boyce, Ruth Bradley, Jean-Philippe Écoffey, Augustin Legrand, Keith McErlean, Lex Shrapnel, Kate Robbins, Christien Anholt, Michael Jibson, Daniel Rigby, Jake Canuso, Gunnar Winbergh	
S E P T E M B E R	22	Jackass Number Two	Paramount Pictures / MTV Films / Dickhouse Productions	Jeff Tremaine (director/screenplay); Spike Jonze (screenplay); Johnny Knoxville, Bam Margera, Chris Pontius, Steve-O, Ryan Dunn, Dave England, Jason Acuña, Preston Lacy, Ehren McGhehey, Brandon DiCamillo, Brandon Novak, April Margera, Phil Margera, Jess Margera, Loomis Fall, Manny Puig, Mat Hoffman, Tony Hawk, Clyde Singleton, Jason Taylor, Mark Zupan, John Waters, Jay Chandrasekhar, Ville Valo, Three 6 Mafia, Roger Alan Wade, Rip Taylor, Luke Wilson, Willie Garson, Mike Judge, Jeff Tremaine, Spike Jonze, Lance Bangs, Rick Kosick, Stephanie Hodge, Mike Kassak, Thor Drake, David Weathers, Jim Karol	
S E P T E M B E R	22	The Science of Sleep	Warner Independent Pictures	Michel Gondry (director/screenplay); Gael García Bernal, Charlotte Gainsbourg, Miou-Miou, Alain Chabat, Emma de Caunes, Sacha Bourdo, Aurélia Petit, Pierre Vaneck	
S E P T E M B E R	27	The Last King of Scotland	Fox Searchlight Pictures / DNA Films / FilmFour / TATfilm Production	Kevin Macdonald (director); Jeremy Brock, Peter Morgan (screenplay); Forest Whitaker, James McAvoy, Kerry Washington, Simon McBurney, Gillian Anderson, David Oyelowo, Abby Mukiibi Nkaaga, David Ashton, Barbara Rafferty, Cleopatra Koheirwe, Michael Wawuyo, Martina Amati, Angela Kalule, Stephen Rwangyezi, Adam Kotz, Sam Okelo, Sarah Nagayi, Chris Wilson, Apollo Okwenje Omamo, Louis Asea, Joanitta Bewulira-Wandera, Consodyne Buzabo, Shabir Mir	
S E P T E M B E R	29	Facing the Giants	Samuel Goldwyn Films / Sherwood Pictures / Provident Films	Alex Kendrick (director/screenplay); Stephen Kendrick (screenplay); Alex Kendrick, Jim McBride, Jason McLeod, Erin Bethea, Mark Richt, Shannen Fields, Bill Butler, Bailey Cave, Steve Williams, Tracy Goode, Tommy McBride, Chris Willis, Ray Wood, David Nixon	
S E P T E M B E R	29	The Guardian	Touchstone Pictures / Beacon Pictures / Flash Film Works	Andrew Davis (director); Ron L. Brinkerhoff (screenplay); Kevin Costner, Ashton Kutcher, Neal McDonough, Melissa Sagemiller, Clancy Brown, Sela Ward, Brian Geraghty, Omari Hardwick, Michael Rady, Bonnie Bramlett, John Heard, Dulé Hill, Brian Patrick Wade, Joe Arquette, Tilky Jones, Chicago Catz, Travis Willingham, Gregory J. Barnett, J.D. Evermore, Ron Dean, Leigh Hennessy, Thomas Rosales Jr., Henry Kingi Jr., Conrad Palmisano, Peter Gail, Shelby Fenner, Damon Lipari, Andrew Schanno, Jeff Loftus, Daniel Molthen, Bryce Cass	
S E P T E M B E R	29	A Guide to Recognizing Your Saints	First Look International / Madman Films	Dito Montiel (director/screenplay); Robert Downey Jr., Shia LaBeouf, Chazz Palminteri, Dianne Wiest, Channing Tatum, Rosario Dawson, Eric Roberts, Melonie Diaz, Eleonore Hendricks, Tibor Feldman, Martin Compston, George DiCenzo, Olga Merediz, David Castro, Federico Castelluccio, Anthony DeSando, Scott Michael Campbell, Chance Kelly, Adam Scarimbolo, Michael Rivera, Julia Garro	
S E P T E M B E R	29	Open Season	Columbia Pictures / Sony Pictures Animation	Jill Culton, Roger Allers (directors); Steve Bencich, Ron J. Friedman (screenplay); Martin Lawrence, Ashton Kutcher, Gary Sinise, Debra Messing, Billy Connolly, Jon Favreau, Georgia Engel, Jane Krakowski, Patrick Warburton, Gordon Tootoosis, Cody Cameron, Danny Mann, Matthew W. Taylor, Nika Futterman, Michelle Murdocca, Fergal Reilly, Jack McGee, Kirk Baily, Jack Blessing, Elisa Gabrielli, Scott Menville, André Sogliuzzo	
S E P T E M B E R	29	School for Scoundrels	Metro-Goldwyn-Mayer / The Weinstein Company / Dimension Films	Todd Phillips (director/screenplay); Scot Armstrong (screenplay); Billy Bob Thornton, Jon Heder, Jacinda Barrett, Luis Guzmán, David Cross, Horatio Sanz, Sarah Silverman, Michael Clarke Duncan, Ben Stiller, Matt Walsh, Todd Louiso, Jon Glaser, Paul Scheer, Dan Fogler, DeRay Davis, Omar J. Dorsey, Marcella Lowery, Joanne Baron, Leonard Earl Howze, Andrew Daly, Jim Parsons, Aziz Ansari, Bob Stephenson, Jack Kehler, Armen Weitzman, Noel Gugliemi, Steve Monroe, Jessica Stroup, Sandy Helberg, Khadijah Haqq, Nicole Randall Johnson	

== October–December ==
Opening		Title	Production company	Cast and crew	Ref.
O C T O B E R	6	The Departed	Warner Bros. Pictures	Martin Scorsese (director); William Monahan (screenplay); Leonardo DiCaprio, Matt Damon, Jack Nicholson, Mark Wahlberg, Martin Sheen, Ray Winstone, Vera Farmiga, Alec Baldwin, Anthony Anderson, Kevin Corrigan, James Badge Dale, David O'Hara, Mark Rolston, Robert Wahlberg, Kristen Dalton, J.C. MacKenzie, Dorothy Lyman, Audrie Neenan, Conor Donovan, Amanda Lynch, Brian Haley, Terry Serpico, Chance Kelly, Shay Duffin, Francesca Scorsese, Emma Tillinger, Craig "Radioman" Castaldo	
O C T O B E R	6	Employee of the Month	Lionsgate / Tapestry Films	Greg Coolidge (director/screenplay); Don Calame, Chris Conroy (screenplay); Dane Cook, Jessica Simpson, Dax Shepard, Andy Dick, Tim Bagley, Harland Williams, Efren Ramirez, Brian George, Sean Whalen, Marcello Thedford, Danny Woodburn	
O C T O B E R	6	Little Children	New Line Cinema / Standard Film Company	Todd Field (director/screenplay); Tom Perrotta (screenplay); Kate Winslet, Jennifer Connelly, Patrick Wilson, Jackie Earle Haley, Noah Emmerich, Gregg Edelman, Phyllis Somerville, Ty Simpkins, Jane Adams, Raymond J. Barry, Trini Alvarado, Marsha Dietlein, Rebecca Schull, Chance Kelly, Sarah Buxton, Christopher Nicholas Smith, Ivar Brogger, Myra Turley, Casper Andreas, Gary Anthony Ramsay, Leon Vitali, Tom Perrotta, Will Lyman, Heidi Albertsen, Sadie Goldstein, Mary B. McCann, Chadwick Brown, Adam Mucci, Lola Pashalinski, Hunter Reid, Thomas Greaney	
O C T O B E R	6	The Queen	Miramax Films	Stephen Frears (director); Peter Morgan (screenplay); Helen Mirren, Michael Sheen, James Cromwell, Helen McCrory, Alex Jennings, Roger Allam, Sylvia Sims, Tim McMullan, Robin Soans, Douglas Reith, Pat Laffan, John McGlynn, Gray O'Brien, Mark Bazeley, Kananu Kirimi, Julian Firth, Michel Gay, Earl Cameron, Elliot Levey, Diana, Princess of Wales, Camilla Parker Bowles, Nicholas Owen, Julia Somerville, Martyn Lewis, Trevor McDonald, John Suchet, Mohamed Al-Fayed, Martin Bashir, Bill Clinton, Tom Cruise, Dodi Fayed, Tom Hanks, Elton John, Nicole Kidman, Nelson Mandela, Luciano Pavarotti, Jon Snow, Steven Spielberg, David Starkey, Tracey Ullman, Ralitsa Vassileva	
O C T O B E R	6	Shortbus	THINKFilm / Fortissimo Films / Q Television / Process Media	John Cameron Mitchell (director/screenplay); Sook-Yin Lee, Paul Dawson, Lindsay Beamish, PJ DeBoy, Raphael A. Barker, Peter Stickles, Jay Brannan, Alan Mandell, David Pittu, Jeff Whitty, Mickey Cottrell, Mary Beth Peil, Justin Vivian Bond, Bradford Scobie, Murray Hill, Jonathan Caouette, Reginald Vermue, Bitch, Yolonda Ross, JD Samson, Daniel Sea, Dirty Martini, Eric Gilliland, Miriam Shor, Hungry March Band, John Cameron Mitchell, Justin Tranter, Jan Hilmer, Shanti Carson, Jasper James, The Wau Wau Sisters, The World-Famous *Bob*, Ray Rivas	
O C T O B E R	6	The Texas Chainsaw Massacre: The Beginning	New Line Cinema / Platinum Dunes	Jonathan Liebesman (director); Sheldon Turner (screenplay); Andrew Bryniarski, Jordana Brewster, Taylor Handley, Diora Baird, Matt Bomer, Lee Tergesen, R. Lee Ermey, Terrence Evans, Marietta Marich, Kathy Lamkin, Tim De Zarn, Lew Temple, Cyia Batten, John Larroquette, Heather Kafka	
O C T O B E R	13	Alex Rider: Operation Stormbreaker	Metro-Goldwyn-Mayer / The Weinstein Company / Isle of Man Film / UK Film Council / Moving Picture Company / Samuelson Productions	Geoffrey Sax (director); Anthony Horowitz (screenplay); Alex Pettyfer, Ewan McGregor, Bill Nighy, Alicia Silverstone, Mickey Rourke, Sophie Okonedo, Damian Lewis, Missi Pyle, Stephen Fry, Sarah Bolger, Andy Serkis, Ashley Walters, Robbie Coltrane, Jimmy Carr, Martin Herdman, Jamie Kenna, Dave Legeno, Bo Poraj, Andrew Brooke	
O C T O B E R	13	The Grudge 2	Columbia Pictures / Ghost House Pictures	Takashi Shimizu (director); Stephen Susco (screenplay); Sarah Michelle Gellar, Amber Tamblyn, Arielle Kebbel, Jennifer Beals, Edison Chen, Sarah Roemer, Teresa Palmer, Takako Fuji, Misako Uno, Matthew Knight, Christopher Cousins, Jenna Dewan, Eve Gordon, Takashi Matsuyama, Joanna Cassidy, Shaun Sipos, Jason Behr, Kim Miyori, Ryo Ishibashi, Ohga Tanaka, Yuya Ozeki, Kyoka Takizawa	
O C T O B E R	13	Infamous	Warner Independent Pictures	Douglas McGrath (director/screenplay); Toby Jones, Sandra Bullock, Daniel Craig, Peter Bogdanovich, Jeff Daniels, Hope Davis, Gwyneth Paltrow, Isabella Rossellini, Juliet Stevenson, Sigourney Weaver, Lee Pace, Michael Panes, John Benjamin Hickey, Libby Villari, Gail Cronauer, Grant James, Marco Perella, Turk Pipkin, Dennis Letts	
O C T O B E R	13	Man of the Year	Universal Pictures / Morgan Creek Productions	Barry Levinson (director/screenplay); Robin Williams, Christopher Walken, Laura Linney, Lewis Black, Jeff Goldblum, David Alpay, Rick Roberts, Karen Hines, Linda Kash, David Nichols, David Ferry, Tina Fey, Amy Poehler, Faith Daniels, Chris Matthews, James Carville, Catherine Crier, Dmitry Chepovetsky, Brandon Firla, Sasha Roiz, Kim Roberts, Jacqueline Pillon, Barbara Radecki, Shawn Roberts, Raynor Scheine	
O C T O B E R	13	The Marine	20th Century Fox / WWE Studios	John Bonito (director); Alan B. McElroy, Michelle Gallagher (screenplay); John Cena, Robert Patrick, Kelly Carlson, Anthony Ray Parker, Abigail Bianca, Damon Gibson, Manu Bennett, Jerome Ehlers, Drew Powell, Firass Dirani, Frank Carlopio, Robert Coleby, Jeff Chase, Jamal Duff, Alan B. McElroy, Damien Garvey	
O C T O B E R	13	One Night with the King	Gener8Xion Entertainment	Michael O. Sajbel (director); Stephan Blinn (screenplay); Tiffany Dupont, Luke Goss, John Rhys-Davies, Omar Sharif, Peter O'Toole, Tommy "Tiny" Lister Jr., Jonah Lotan, John Noble, James Callis, Denzil Smith, Jyoti Dogra, Tom Alter, Aditya Bal, Dilshad Patel, Nimrat Kaur, Asif Basra	
O C T O B E R	13	Tideland	THINKFilm	Terry Gilliam (director/screenplay); Tony Grisoni (screenplay); Jodelle Ferland, Brendan Fletcher, Janet McTeer, Jennifer Tilly, Jeff Bridges, Dylan Taylor, Wendy Anderson, Sally Crooks	
O C T O B E R	20	Flags of Our Fathers	DreamWorks Pictures / Warner Bros. Pictures / Amblin Entertainment / Malpaso Productions	Clint Eastwood (director); William Broyles Jr., Paul Haggis (screenplay); Ryan Phillippe, Jesse Bradford, Adam Beach, John Benjamin Hickey, Paul Walker, John Slattery, Barry Pepper, Jamie Bell, Robert Patrick, Neal McDonough, Benjamin Walker, Melanie Lynskey, Tom McCarthy, Chris Bauer, Gordon Clapp, Ned Eisenberg, Judith Ivey, Ann Dowd, Myra Turley, Jason Gray-Stanford, Joseph Cross, Alessandro Mastrobuono, Scott Eastwood, David Patrick Kelly, Stark Sands, George Grizzard, Harve Presnell, George Hearn, Len Cariou, Christopher Curry, Bubba Lewis, Beth Grant, Connie Ray, Mary Beth Peil, Jon Polito, Michael Cumpsty, Kirk B.R. Woller, Tom Verica, Matt Huffman, David Hornsby, Brian Kimmet, David Rasche, Tom Mason, David Clennon, Oliver Davis, Ron Fassler, Jayma Mays, John Hoogenakker, Mark Colson, Danny McCarthy, James Horan, Silas Weir Mitchell, Martin Delaney, Björgvin Franz Gíslason, Darri Ingolfsson, Jeremiah Bitsui	
O C T O B E R	20	Flicka	20th Century Fox / Fox 2000 Pictures	Michael Mayer (director); Mark Rosenthal, Lawrence Konner (screenplay); Alison Lohman, Tim McGraw, Maria Bello, Ryan Kwanten, Dallas Roberts, Nick Searcy, Danny Pino, Kaylee DeFer, Jeffrey Nordling, Dey Young, Buck Taylor, Wade Williams, Armie Hammer	
O C T O B E R	20	Marie Antoinette	Columbia Pictures / Tohokushinsha Film / American Zoetrope	Sofia Coppola (director/screenplay); Kirsten Dunst, Jason Schwartzman, Judy Davis, Rip Torn, Rose Byrne, Asia Argento, Molly Shannon, Shirley Henderson, Danny Huston, Steve Coogan, Tom Hardy, Marianne Faithfull, Mary Nighy, Jamie Dornan, Al Weaver, Sarah Adler, Sebastian Armesto, Clémentine Poidatz, Céline Sallette, Aurore Clément, Guillaume Gallienne, Jean-Christophe Bouvet, James Lance, Mathieu Amalric, Joseph Malerba, André Oumansky, Alexia Landeau, Katrine Boorman, Paul Jasmin, Francis Leplay, Dominic Gould, Phoenix	
O C T O B E R	20	The Prestige	Touchstone Pictures / Warner Bros. Pictures / Newmarket Films	Christopher Nolan (director/screenplay); Jonathan Nolan (screenplay); Hugh Jackman, Christian Bale, Michael Caine, Scarlett Johansson, Rebecca Hall, Andy Serkis, David Bowie, Piper Perabo, Ricky Jay, Roger Rees, W. Morgan Sheppard, Daniel Davis, Jim Piddock, Christopher Neame, Mark Ryan, Jamie Harris, Ron Perkins, Chao-Li Chi, Ezra Buzzington, Edward Hibbert, James Otis, Enn Reitel	
O C T O B E R	27	Babel	Paramount Pictures / Paramount Vantage / Anonymous Content / Central Films / Media Rights Capital	Alejandro González Iñárritu (director); Guillermo Arriaga (screenplay); Brad Pitt, Cate Blanchett, Gael García Bernal, Kōji Yakusho, Adriana Barraza, Rinko Kikuchi, Elle Fanning, Peter Wight, Harriet Walter, Michael Peña, Michael Maloney, André Oumansky, Dermot Crowley, Driss Roukhe, Alex Jennings, Nathan Gamble, Emilio Echevarría, Clifton Collins Jr., Aaron D. Spears, Robert Fyfe, Ayaka Komatsu, Mohamed Akhzam, Boubker Ait El Caid, Said Tarchani, Mustaphia Rachidi, Abdelkader Bara, Wahiba Sahmi, Satoshi Nikaido, Yuko Murata, Shigemitsu Ogi	
O C T O B E R	27	Catch a Fire	Focus Features / Working Title Films / Mirage Enterprises	Phillip Noyce (director); Shawn Slovo (screenplay); Derek Luke, Tim Robbins, Bonnie Henna, Mncedisi Shabangu, Nomhle Nkonyeni, Bubu Mazibuko, Marius Weyers, Brandon Auret, Mpho Osei Tutu, Jonathan Pienaar, Robyn Slovo, Patrick Chamusso, Tumisho Masha, Sithembiso Khumalo, Terry Pheto, Michele Burgers, Mpho Lovinga, Malcolm Purkey, Ziizi Mahlati	
O C T O B E R	27	Death of a President	Newmarket Films / Optimum Releasing / FilmFour / Borough Films	Gabriel Range (director/screenplay); Simon Finch (screenplay); Becky Ann Baker, Jay Patterson, Michael Reilly Burke, James Urbaniak, Christian Stolte, Gerry Becker, Walter Jacobson, George W. Bush, Dick Cheney, Richard M. Daley, Jong-il Kim, Hend Ayoub, Brian Boland, Robert Mangiardi, Jay Whittaker, Neko Parham, Seena Jon, Chavez Ravine, Patricia Buckley, Malik Bader, Tony Dale	
O C T O B E R	27	Dixie Chicks: Shut Up and Sing	The Weinstein Company	Barbara Kopple, Cecilia Peck (directors); Dixie Chicks, Adrian Pasdar, Rick Rubin, Pat Buchanan, Barbara Boxer, George W. Bush, Anderson Cooper, Dan Wilson, Aaron Brown, Toby Keith, Bill Maher, John McCain, Bill O'Reilly, Colin Powell, Robin Quivers, Condoleezza Rice, Donald Rumsfeld, Diane Sawyer, Chad Smith, Howard Stern, Chris Testa, Richard Wilkins, Paula Zahn, Paul Beane, Cindi Berger, Simon Renshaw, Gareth Maguire	
O C T O B E R	27	Running with Scissors	TriStar Pictures	Ryan Murphy (director/screenplay); Annette Bening, Brian Cox, Joseph Fiennes, Evan Rachel Wood, Alec Baldwin, Jill Clayburgh, Joseph Cross, Gwyneth Paltrow, Gabrielle Union, Patrick Wilson, Kristin Chenoweth, Dagmara Domińczyk, Colleen Camp, Omid Abtahi, Marianne Muellerleile, Augusten Burroughs, Leslie Grossman	
O C T O B E R	27	Saw III	Lionsgate / Twisted Pictures	Darren Lynn Bousman (director); Leigh Whannell (screenplay); Tobin Bell, Shawnee Smith, Angus Macfadyen, Bahar Soomekh, Dina Meyer, Donnie Wahlberg, Leigh Whannell, Mpho Koaho, Lyriq Bent, J. Larose, Costas Mandylor, Betsy Russell, Niamh Wilson, Alan van Sprang, Kim Roberts, Barry Flatman, Debra Lynne McCabe, Stefan Georgiou	
N O V E M B E R	3	Borat! Cultural Learnings of America for Make Benefit Glorious Nation of Kazakhstan	20th Century Fox / Fox 2000 Pictures	Larry Charles (director); Sacha Baron Cohen, Anthony Hines, Peter Baynham, Dan Mazer (screenplay); Sacha Baron Cohen, Ken Davitian, Luenell Campbell, Pamela Anderson, Alan Keyes, Bob Barr, Ilham Aliyev, Carole De Saram, Chip Pickering, Bobby Rowe, James Smith, Larry Walker, Grace Welch	
N O V E M B E R	3	Flushed Away	Paramount Pictures / DreamWorks Animation / Aardman Animations	David Bowers, Sam Fell (directors); Dick Clement, Ian La Frenais, Chris Lloyd, Joe Keenan, William Davies (screenplay); Hugh Jackman, Kate Winslet, Ian McKellen, Andy Serkis, Bill Nighy, Jean Reno, Shane Richie, Kathy Burke, David Suchet, Miriam Margolyes, Christopher Fairbank, Susan Duerden, Miles Richardson, John Motson, Roger Blake, Conrad Vernon, Jonathan Kydd, Christopher Knights, Emma Tate, Tom McGrath, Sam Fell, David Bowers	
N O V E M B E R	3	The Santa Clause 3: The Escape Clause	Walt Disney Pictures / Boxing Cat Films	Michael Lembeck (director); Ed Decter, John J. Strauss (screenplay); Tim Allen, Martin Short, Elizabeth Mitchell, Ann-Margret, Alan Arkin, Judge Reinhold, Wendy Crewson, Eric Lloyd, Spencer Breslin, Liliana Mumy, Peter Boyle, Kevin Pollak, Aisha Tyler, Michael Dorn, Jay Thomas, Art LaFleur, Abigail Breslin, Sammi Hanratty, Ridge Canipe, Madeline Carroll, Charlie Stewart, Zach Mills,	
N O V E M B E R	3	Unknown	IFC First Take / The Weinstein Company	Simon Brand (director); Matthew Waynee (screenplay); Jim Caviezel, Greg Kinnear, Bridget Moynahan, Joe Pantoliano, Barry Pepper, Jeremy Sisto, Peter Stormare, Chris Mulkey, Clayne Crawford, Kevin Chapman, Mark Boone Junior, Wilmer Calderon, David Selby, Adam Rodriguez, Jeff Daniel Phillips, Thomas Rosales Jr., Mel Rodriguez, Patricia Belcher, Victoria Justice, Simon Brand, Amparo Grisales, Alfredo Castro	
N O V E M B E R	3	Volver	Sony Pictures Classics	Pedro Almodóvar (director/screenplay); Penélope Cruz, Carmen Maura, Lola Dueñas, Blanca Portillo, Yohana Cobo, Chus Lampreave, Antonio de la Torre, María Isabel Díaz, Yolanda Ramos, Agustín Almodóvar, Carlos Blanco, Neus Sanz, Leandro Rivera	
N O V E M B E R	9	Breaking and Entering	Metro-Goldwyn-Mayer / The Weinstein Company / Miramax Films / Mirage Enterprises / Alliance Films	Anthony Minghella (director/screenplay); Jude Law, Juliette Binoche, Robin Wright, Rafi Gavron, Martin Freeman, Juliet Stevenson, Ed Westwick, Ray Winstone, Vera Farmiga, Romi Aboulafia, Velibor Topic, Rad Lazar, Poppy Rogers, Anna Chancellor, Mark Benton, Ting-Ting Hu, O-T Fagbenle, Eleanor Matsuura, Caroline Chikezie, Branka Katić, Ellen Thomas, Michael Smiley	
N O V E M B E R	10	Fur	Picturehouse / River Road Entertainment	Steven Shainberg (director); Erin Cressida Wilson (screenplay); Nicole Kidman, Robert Downey Jr., Ty Burrell, Harris Yulin, Jane Alexander, Emmy Clarke, Boris McGiver, Marceline Hugot, Emily Bergl, Matt Servitto, Jess Osuna, Rachel Boynton, Agnes 'Peppermint' Moore, Genevieve McCarthy, Mary Duffy	
N O V E M B E R	10	A Good Year	20th Century Fox / Scott Free Productions	Ridley Scott (director); Marc Klein (screenplay); Russell Crowe, Albert Finney, Marion Cotillard, Didier Bourdon, Abbie Cornish, Tom Hollander, Freddie Highmore, Isabelle Candelier, Rafe Spall, Richard Coyle, Archie Panjabi, Kenneth Cranham, Daniel Mays, Jacques Herlin, Valeria Bruni Tedeschi, Giannina Facio, Craig Robert Young, Edita Brychta, Hélène Cardona, Neil Dickson, Jean Gilpin, Nicholas Guest, Moira Quirk, Karen Strassman	
N O V E M B E R	10	Come Early Morning	Roadside Attractions / Bold Films	Joey Lauren Adams (director/screenplay); Ashley Judd, Jeffrey Donovan, Tim Blake Nelson, Laura Prepon, Scott Wilson, Stacy Keach, Diane Ladd, Ray McKinnon, Pat Corley, Jeff Nichols, James Cotten, Lew Temple, Nancy Ellen Mills	
N O V E M B E R	10	Harsh Times	Metro-Goldwyn-Mayer	David Ayer (director/screenplay); Christian Bale, Freddy Rodriguez, Eva Longoria, Tammy Trull, Terry Crews, Noel Gugliemi, Craig Ricci Shaynak, J.K. Simmons, Armando Riesco, Emilio Rivera, Kenneth Choi, Samantha Esteban, Tania Verafield, Chaka Forman, Adriana Milian, César Garcia Gómez, Geo Corvera, Blue Mesquita, Michael Monks, Sonia Iris Lozada, Daniel Edward Mora, Anthony "Citric" Campos, Abel Soto, Robert Larabee, Paul Renteria, Brisa, Violeta Monroy	
N O V E M B E R	10	The Return	Rogue Pictures	Asif Kapadia (director); Adam Sussman (screenplay); Sarah Michelle Gellar, Peter O'Brien, Adam Scott, Kate Beahan, Sam Shepard, J.C. MacKenzie, Brad Leland	
N O V E M B E R	10	Stranger Than Fiction	Columbia Pictures / Mandate Pictures	Marc Forster (director); Zach Helm (screenplay); Will Ferrell, Maggie Gyllenhaal, Dustin Hoffman, Queen Latifah, Emma Thompson, Tony Hale, Tom Hulce, Linda Hunt, Kristin Chenoweth, John Cleese, Bruce Jarchow, T.J. Jagodowski, Peter Grosz, Christian Stolte, Danny McCarthy, Frank Caeti, Andrew Rothenberg, Bob Papenbrook, Anouk Aimée, Eli Goodman, Jean-Louis Trintignant	
N O V E M B E R	17	Bobby	Metro-Goldwyn-Mayer / The Weinstein Company / Bold Films	Emilio Estevez (director/screenplay); Laurence Fishburne, Anthony Hopkins, Helen Hunt, Lindsay Lohan, William H. Macy, Demi Moore, Sharon Stone, Elijah Wood, Harry Belafonte, Joy Bryant, Nick Cannon, Emilio Estevez, Heather Graham, Joshua Jackson, Ashton Kutcher, Shia LaBeouf, Freddy Rodriguez, Martin Sheen, Christian Slater, Spencer Garrett, Brian Geraghty, David Krumholtz, Svetlana Metkina, Jacob Vargas, Mary Elizabeth Winstead, Scoot McNairy, Louis Mustillo, John F. Kennedy, Robert F. Kennedy, Ted Kennedy, Martin Luther King, Carolyn Stotesbery, Dave Fraunces, Jeridan Frye, David Kobzantsev	
N O V E M B E R	17	Candy	THINKFilm	Neil Armfield (director/screenplay); Luke Davies (screenplay); Heath Ledger, Abbie Cornish, Geoffrey Rush, Tom Budge, Tony Martin, Noni Hazlehurst, Tara Morice, Cristian Castillo, Paul Blackwell, Adrienne Pickering, Damon Herriman, Nathaniel Dean, Luke Davies, Anni Finsterer, Roberto Meza Mont, Tim McKenzie, Maddi Newling, Jason Chan	
N O V E M B E R	17	Casino Royale	Metro-Goldwyn-Mayer / Columbia Pictures	Martin Campbell (director); Neal Purvis and Robert Wade, Paul Haggis (screenplay); Daniel Craig, Eva Green, Mads Mikkelsen, Giancarlo Giannini, Jeffrey Wright, Judi Dench, Caterina Murino, Ivana Miličević, Simon Abkarian, Jesper Christensen, Tobias Menzies, Isaach de Bankolé, Caterina Murino, Claudio Santamaria, Sébastien Foucan, Richard Branson	
N O V E M B E R	17	For Your Consideration	Warner Independent Pictures / Castle Rock Entertainment / Shangri-La Entertainment	Christopher Guest (director/screenplay); Eugene Levy (screenplay); Christopher Guest, Eugene Levy, Catherine O'Hara, Parker Posey, Jennifer Coolidge, Harry Shearer, Fred Willard, Jane Lynch, Michael McKean, Bob Balaban, John Michael Higgins, Jim Piddock, Rachael Harris, Christopher Moynihan, Paul Dooley, John Krasinski, Don Lake, Michael Hitchcock, Sandra Oh, Richard Kind, Ari Graynor, Scott Adsit, Simon Helberg, Kevin Sussman, Jordan Black, Nina Conti, Mary McCormack, Shawn Christian, Deborah Theaker, Ricky Gervais, Larry Miller, Craig Bierko, Loudon Wainwright, Jessica St. Clair, Casey Wilson, Derek Waters	
N O V E M B E R	17	Fast Food Nation	Fox Searchlight Pictures / Participant Productions / HanWay Films / BBC Films / Recorded Picture Company	Richard Linklater (director/screenplay); Eric Schlosser (screenplay); Patricia Arquette, Bobby Cannavale, Paul Dano, Luis Guzmán, Ethan Hawke, Ashley Johnson, Greg Kinnear, Kris Kristofferson, Avril Lavigne, Esai Morales, Catalina Sandino Moreno, Lou Taylor Pucci, Ana Claudia Talancón, Wilmer Valderrama, Bruce Willis, Matt Hensarling, Aaron Himelstein, Cherami Leigh, Dana Wheeler-Nicholson, Ellar Coltrane, Glen Powell, Marco Perella, Roger Cudney, Armando Hernández, Yareli Arizmendi	
N O V E M B E R	17	Happy Feet	Warner Bros. Pictures / Village Roadshow Pictures	George Miller (director/screenplay); John Collee, Judy Morris, Warren Coleman (screenplay); Elijah Wood, Robin Williams, Brittany Murphy, Hugh Jackman, Nicole Kidman, Hugo Weaving, Anthony LaPaglia, Magda Szubanski, Steve Irwin, Fat Joe, Miriam Margoyles, E.G. Daily, Carlos Alazraqui, Lombardo Boyar, Jeff Garcia, Johnny Sanchez III, Roger Rose, Danny Mann, Michael Cornacchia, Tiriel Mora, Richard Carter, Lee Perry, Peter Carroll, Giselle Loren, Michelle Arthur, Dee Bradley Baker, Chrissie Hynde, Felix Williamson, Henry Nixon, Belinda Bromilow, Dasi Ruz, Helmut Bakaitis, Simon Westaway, J. Grant Albrecht, Logan Arens, Shane Baumel, Kwesi Boakye, A.J. Buckley, Erin Chambers, Rickey D'Shon Collins, Chris Edgerly, Jeff Fischer, Khamani Griffin, Khadijah Haqq, Aldis Hodge, Arif S. Kinchen, Rachel York, Alyssa Shafer, Cesar Flores	
N O V E M B E R	17	Let's Go to Prison	Universal Pictures / The Carsey-Werner Company / Strike Entertainment	Bob Odenkirk (director); Robert Ben Garant, Thomas Lennon, Michael Patrick Jann (screenplay); Dax Shepard, Will Arnett, Chi McBride, David Koechner, Dylan Baker, Michael Shannon, Bob Odenkirk, Amy Hill, David Darlow, Jerry Minor, Susan Messing, Jim Zulevic, Michael Hitchcock, Jim Bakker, James Brown, Heidi Fleiss, John Gotti, Tim Heidecker, Leona Helmsley, Tommy Lee, Charles Manson, Ozzy Osbourne, Martha Stewart, Mike Tyson, Eric Wareheim	
N O V E M B E R	20	Griffin & Phoenix	Metro-Goldwyn-Mayer / Gold Circle Films / Sidney Kimmel Entertainment	Ed Stone (director); John Hill (screenplay); Dermot Mulroney, Amanda Peet, Sarah Paulson, Blair Brown, Alison Elliott, Lois Smith, Jonah Meyerson, Simon Jones, Jesse Tyler Ferguson, Adriane Lenox, Novella Nelson, Don McManus, Brian Klugman, Dana Eskelson, Michael Showalter, Fred Armisen, Max Morris, Adam Kulbersh, Sile Bermingham, Pablo Hernandez	
N O V E M B E R	22	Deck the Halls	20th Century Fox / Regency Enterprises	John Whitesell (director); Matt Corman, Chris Ord, Don Rhymer (screenplay); Danny DeVito, Matthew Broderick, Kristin Davis, Kristin Chenoweth, Alia Shawkat, Jorge Garcia, Jackie Burroughs, Fred Armisen, Gillian Vigman, Ryan Devlin, Lochlyn Munro, Sean O'Bryan, Garry Chalk, Nicola Peltz, Kal Penn, Cory Monteith, Zak Santiago, Jill Krop, SuChin Pak, David Lewis, Alfred E. Humphreys, Agam Darshi, Fulvio Cecere, Ty Olsson, Calum Worthy, Dylan Blue, Kelly Aldridge, Sabrina Aldridge	
N O V E M B E R	22	Déjà Vu	Touchstone Pictures / Jerry Bruckheimer Films / Scott Free Productions	Tony Scott (director); Bill Marsilii, Terry Rossio (screenplay); Denzel Washington, Paula Patton, Jim Caviezel, Val Kilmer, Adam Goldberg, Bruce Greenwood, Elden Henson, Erika Alexander, Elle Fanning, Matt Craven, Enrique Castillo, Brian Howe, Shondrella Avery, John McConnell, Brian Durkin, Scott Alan Smith, Lew Temple, Scott Klace, Andy Umberger, Rio Hackford, Gary Grubbs, Lara Grice, Lowell Perry, Michael Arata, Sylvia Jefferies, Carol Sutton, Julia Lashae, James Huang, Ann Turkel, Charmaine Neville, Nolan North	
N O V E M B E R	22	The Fountain	Warner Bros. Pictures / Regency Enterprises	Darren Aronofsky (director/screenplay); Hugh Jackman, Rachel Weisz, Ellen Burstyn, Mark Margolis, Stephen McHattie, Cliff Curtis, Sean Patrick Thomas, Donna Murphy, Ethan Suplee, Richard McMillan, Boyd Banks	
N O V E M B E R	22	Tenacious D in The Pick of Destiny	New Line Cinema / Red Hour Films	Liam Lynch (director/screenplay); Jack Black, Kyle Gass (screenplay); Jack Black, Kyle Gass, JR Reed, Ronnie James Dio, Ben Stiller, Paul F. Tompkins, Dave Grohl, Meat Loaf, Tim Robbins, John C. Reilly, Cynthia Ettinger, Andrew Caldwell, Amy Poehler, Colin Hanks, Amy Adams, Gregg Turkington, Evie Peck, Jason Segel, David Krumholtz, Fred Armisen, Ned Bellamy, Jay Johnston, John Ennis, David Koechner, Troy Gentile, Mason Knight	
D E C E M B E R	1	10 Items or Less	THINKFilm / ClickStar / Revelations Entertainment / Mockingbird Pictures	Brad Silberling (director/screenplay); Morgan Freeman, Paz Vega, Kumar Pallana, Jonah Hill, Anne Dudek, Bobby Cannavale, Jim Parsons	
D E C E M B E R	1	The Nativity Story	New Line Cinema / Temple Hill Entertainment	Catherine Hardwicke (director); Mike Rich (screenplay); Keisha Castle-Hughes, Oscar Isaac, Hiam Abbass, Shaun Toub, Alexander Siddig, Ciarán Hinds, Shohreh Aghdashloo, Stanley Townsend, Eriq Ebouaney, Alessandro Giuggoli, Nadim Sawalha, Stefan Kalipha, Tomer Sisley, Jeffrey Kissoon, Zinedine Soualem, Ted Rusoff, Yvonne Sciò, Andrea Bruschi, Shelby Young	
D E C E M B E R	1	Sweet Land	Libero LLC	Ali Selim (director/screenplay); Elizabeth Reaser, Tim Guinee, Lois Smith, Alex Kingston, Paul Sand, Tom Gilroy, Robert Hogan, Jodie Markell, John Heard, Patrick Heusinger, Ned Beatty, Alan Cumming, Stephen Pelinski	
D E C E M B E R	1	Turistas	Fox Atomic / 2929 Entertainment	John Stockwell (director); Michael Arlen Ross (screenplay); Josh Duhamel, Melissa George, Olivia Wilde, Desmond Askew, Beau Garrett, Max Brown, John Stockwell, Agles Steib, Miguel Lunardi, Gustav Roth, Olga Diegues, Lucy Ramos, Andréa Leal, Julia Dykstra, Diego Santiago, Marcão, Miguelito Acosta	
D E C E M B E R	1	Van Wilder: The Rise of Taj	Metro-Goldwyn-Mayer / Bauer Martinez Entertainment / Tapestry Films / Myriad Pictures / National Lampoon	Mort Nathan (director); David Drew Gallagher (screenplay); Kal Penn, Lauren Cohan, Daniel Percival, Glen Barry, Anthony Cozens, Holly Davidson, Tom Davey, William de Coverly, Steven Rathman, Amy Steel, Beth Steel, Kulvinder Ghir, Shobu Kapoor, Gabriela Modorcea, Jonathan Cecil	
D E C E M B E R	8	Apocalypto	Touchstone Pictures / Icon Productions	Mel Gibson (director/screenplay); Farhad Safinia (screenplay); Rudy Youngblood, Raoul Trujillo, Mayra Sérbulo, Gerardo Taracena, Israel Contreras, Dalia Hernández, Morris Birdyellowhead, Abel Woolrich, Ian Uriel, Rodolfo Palacios, Bernardo Ruiz Juarez, Ammel Rodrigo Mendoza, Ricardo Diaz Mendoza, Carlos Emilio Báez, Amílcar Ramírez, Israel Ríos, María Isabel Díaz, Espiridion Acosta Cache, Ariel Galván, Fernando Hernández, María Isidra Hoil, Aquetzali Garcia, Rafael Vélez, Diana Botello	
D E C E M B E R	8	Blood Diamond	Warner Bros. Pictures / Virtual Studios	Edward Zwick (director); Charles Leavitt (screenplay); Leonardo DiCaprio, Jennifer Connelly, Djimon Hounsou, Michael Sheen, Arnold Vosloo, David Harewood, Basil Wallace, Stephen Collins, Jimi Mistry, Marius Weyers, Jonathan Pienaar, Ntare Mwine, Ato Essandoh, Tony Kgoroge, Nick Reding, Akin Omotoso, Adetokumboh M'Cormack, Gaurav Chopra, Tyrone Keogh, Winston Ntshona, Zenzo Ngqobe, Clare Holman, Kagiso Kuypers, Antony Coleman, Benu Mabhena, Anointing Lukola	
D E C E M B E R	8	The Holiday	Columbia Pictures / Universal Pictures / Relativity Media / Waverly Films	Nancy Meyers (director/screenplay); Cameron Diaz, Kate Winslet, Jude Law, Jack Black, Edward Burns, Eli Wallach, Rufus Sewell, Lindsay Lohan, James Franco, Sarah Parish, Shannyn Sossamon, Kathryn Hahn, John Krasinski, Odette Yustman, Alex O'Loughlin, Bill Macy, Shelley Berman, Hal Douglas, Jon Prescott, Patrick Cavanaugh, Nicholas Downs, Dustin Hoffman	
D E C E M B E R	8	Unaccompanied Minors	Warner Bros. Pictures / Village Roadshow Pictures / The Donners' Company	Paul Feig (director); Jacob Meszaros, Mya Stark (screenplay); Lewis Black, Wilmer Valderrama, Tyler James Williams, Dyllan Christopher, Brett Kelly, Gia Mantegna, Quinn Shephard, Dominique Saldaña, Paget Brewster, Rob Corddry, Wayne Federman, Mario Lopez, Jessica Walter, Rob Riggle, David Koechner, B. J. Novak, Mindy Kaling, Tony Hale, Cedric Yarbrough, Kristen Wiig, Al Roker, Teri Garr, Bruce McCulloch, Kevin McDonald, Mark McKinney, Dave 'Gruber' Allen, Steve Bannos, Nick Thune, Heather Beers, Ben Falcone, Lauren McKnight, Noah Bastian, Gary Morgan, Conrad Palmisano	
D E C E M B E R	12	Air Buddies	Buena Vista Home Entertainment / Keystone Family Pictures / Key Pix Productions	Robert Vince (director/screenplay); Anna McRoberts, Phil Hanley (screenplay); Patrick Cranshaw, Holmes Osborne, Jane Carr, Paul Rae, Trevor Wright, Richard Karn, Cynthia Stevenson, Don Knotts, Josh Flitter, Abigail Breslin, Spencer Fox, Dominic Scott Kay, Skyler Gisondo, Tom Everett Scott, Molly Shannon, Wallace Shawn, Debra Jo Rupp, Michael Clarke Duncan, Gig Morton, Cainan Wiebe, Slade Austin Pearce, Christian Pikes, Tyler Guerrero, Jarvis Dashkewytch, Kelly Chapek, Steven Makaj, Karen Holness	
D E C E M B E R	15	Charlotte's Web	Paramount Pictures / Walden Media / The K Entertainment Company / Nickelodeon Movies	Gary Winick (director); Susannah Grant, Karey Kirkpatrick (screenplay); Julia Roberts, Dakota Fanning, Dominic Scott Kay, Steve Buscemi, John Cleese, Oprah Winfrey, Cedric the Entertainer, Kathy Bates, Reba McEntire, Robert Redford, Thomas Haden Church, André Benjamin, Beau Bridges, Kevin Anderson, Essie Davis, Siobhan Fallon Hogan, Gary Basaraba, Nate Mooney, Nicholas Bell, Abraham Benrubi, Sam Shepard, Julia Zemiro, Brian Stepanek, Fred Tatasciore, Bradley White, Ella Scott Lynch, Elizabeth Saunders, Louis Corbett, Julian O'Donnell, Joel McCrary, Briana Hodge, Maia Kirkpatrick, Jennessa Rose	
D E C E M B E R	15	Dreamgirls	DreamWorks Pictures / Paramount Pictures	Bill Condon (director/screenplay); Jamie Foxx, Beyoncé Knowles, Eddie Murphy, Jennifer Hudson, Danny Glover, Anika Noni Rose, Keith Robinson, Sharon Leal, Hinton Battle, Yvette Cason, Loretta Devine, Dawnn Lewis, John Lithgow, John Krasinski, Jaleel White, Cleo King, Robert Cicchini, Yvette Nicole Brown, Ken Page, Ralph Harris, Michael-Leon Wooley, Esther Scott, Bobby Slayton, JoNell Kennedy, Fatima Robinson, Bernard Fowler, Rory O'Malley, Laura Bell Bundy, Ivar Brogger, Jocko Sims, Eddie Mekka, Robert Curtis Brown, Gregg Berger, Daniel Riordan, Jimmy Pardo, Damion Poitier, Alexander Folk, Jordan Wright, Mariah I. Wilson, Paul Kirby	
D E C E M B E R	15	Eragon	20th Century Fox / Fox 2000 Pictures	Stefen Fangmeier (director); Peter Buchman (screenplay); Ed Speleers, Jeremy Irons, Sienna Guillory, Robert Carlyle, Djimon Hounsou, Garrett Hedlund, Joss Stone, John Malkovich, Rachel Weisz, Alun Armstrong, Chris Egan, Gary Lewis, Steve Speirs, Caroline Chikezie, Spencer Wilding, Maggie Baird, Peter Dennis, Neil Dickson, Jean Gilpin, Martin Jarvis, Sean Mahon, Julian Stone, Sala Baker, Ralph Brown, Tamsin Egerton, Richard Rifkin, Matt Devere	
D E C E M B E R	15	The Good German	Warner Bros. Pictures / Virtual Studios	Steven Soderbergh (director); Paul Attanasio (screenplay); George Clooney, Cate Blanchett, Tobey Maguire, Beau Bridges, Tony Curran, Leland Orser, Jack Thompson, Robin Weigert, Ravil Isyanov, Dave Power, Christian Oliver, J. Paul Boehmer, Igor Korošec, Brandon Keener, Winston Churchill, Iosif Stalin, Patrick Tatten, Harry S. Truman	
D E C E M B E R	15	Home of the Brave	Metro-Goldwyn-Mayer / Millennium Films	Irwin Winkler (director/screenplay); Samuel L. Jackson, Jessica Biel, Brian Presley, Curtis "50 Cent" Jackson, Christina Ricci, Chad Michael Murray, Victoria Rowell, Jeffrey Nordling, Vyto Ruginis, Sam Jones III, James MacDonald, Sandra Nelson, Margo Winkler, Thad Luckinbill, Joe Cappelletti	
D E C E M B E R	15	The Pursuit of Happyness	Columbia Pictures / Relativity Media / Overbrook Entertainment / Escape Artists Motion Pictures	Gabriele Muccino (director); Steven Conrad (screenplay); Will Smith, Jaden Smith, Thandie Newton, Brian Howe, Dan Castellaneta, James Karen, Kurt Fuller, Takayo Fischer, George Cheung, Geoff Callan, Scott Klace, Victor Raider-Wexler, Mark Christopher Lawrence, Esther Scott, Cecil Williams, Amir Talai, Chris Gardner	
D E C E M B E R	19	Salvage	Off Hollywood Pictures	Jeffrey and Joshua Crook (directors/screenplay); Lauren Currie, Cody Darbe, Chris Ferry, Maureen Olander, John P. Miller, Jessica DeLong, Sam Dahler	
D E C E M B E R	20	Letters from Iwo Jima	Warner Bros. Pictures / DreamWorks Pictures / Amblin Entertainment / Malpaso Productions	Clint Eastwood (director); Iris Yamashita (screenplay); Ken Watanabe, Kazunari Ninomiya, Tsuyoshi Ihara, Ryō Kase, Nakamura Shidō II, Yuki Matsuzaki, Takashi Yamaguchi, Eijiro Ozaki, Luke Eberl, Jeremy Glazer, Mark Moses, Roxanne Hart, Nori Bunasawa, Ken Kensei, Ryan Kelley, Daisuke Tsuji, Ryan Carnes, Hiroshi Watanabe, Takumi Bando, Alan Sato, Nae Yuuki, Nobumasa Sakagami, Akiko Shima, Ikuma Ando	
D E C E M B E R	20	The Painted Veil	Warner Independent Pictures / Bob Yari Productions / The Mark Gordon Company / The Colleton Company / Class 5 Films / Dragon Studios	John Curran (director); Ron Nyswaner (screenplay); Naomi Watts, Edward Norton, Liev Schreiber, Toby Jones, Diana Rigg, Anthony Wong, Alan David, Maggie Steed, Cheng Sihan, Zoe Telford, Lü Yan, Xia Yu, Juliet Howland, Lucy Voller, Marie-Laure Descoureaux, Feng Li	
D E C E M B E R	20	Rocky Balboa	Metro-Goldwyn-Mayer / Columbia Pictures / Revolution Studios	Sylvester Stallone (director/screenplay); Sylvester Stallone, Burt Young, Antonio Tarver, Milo Ventimiglia, Geraldine Hughes, Tony Burton, Lou DiBella, James Francis Kelly III, Pedro Lovell, Jacob "Stitch" Duran, Talia Shire, A.J. Benza, Mike Tyson, Henry G. Sanders, Woody Paige, Skip Bayless, Jay Crawford, Brian Kenny, Dana Jacobson, Jim Lampley, Larry Merchant, Max Kellerman, LeRoy Neiman, Bert Sugar, Michael Buffer, Joe Cortez, Frank Stallone, Tobias Segal, Stu Nahan, Dolph Lundgren, Burgess Meredith, Mr. T	
D E C E M B E R	21	Curse of the Golden Flower	Sony Pictures Classics	Zhang Yimou (director/screenplay); Chow Yun-fat, Gong Li, Jay Chou, Liu Ye, Man Li, Chen Jin, Liam O'Brien, Yuri Lowenthal	
D E C E M B E R	21	Venus	Miramax Films / FilmFour / UK Film Council / Free Range Films	Roger Michell (director); Hanif Kureishi (screenplay); Peter O'Toole, Leslie Phillips, Jodie Whittaker, Richard Griffiths, Vanessa Redgrave, Cathryn Bradshaw, Bronson Webb, Harvey Virdi, Ashley Madekwe, Kellie Shirley, Ony Uhiara, Andrea Riseborough, Tom Mison, Paul Chahidi, Christine Bottomley, Marlene Sidaway, Lolita Chakrabarti, Sam Spruell, Tom Brooke	
D E C E M B E R	22	The Good Shepherd	Universal Pictures / Morgan Creek Productions	Robert De Niro (director); Eric Roth (screenplay); Matt Damon, Angelina Jolie, Robert De Niro, Alec Baldwin, Gabriel Macht, William Hurt, Joe Pesci, John Turturro, Billy Crudup, Tammy Blanchard, Michael Gambon, Timothy Hutton, John Sessions, Keir Dullea, Martina Gedeck, Lee Pace, Eddie Redmayne, Tommy Nelson, Mark Ivanir, Oleg Stefan, Liya Kebede, Michael Arden, John Hill, Austin Williams, Lee Bryant, Laila Robins, Christopher Evan Welch, Tuc Watkins, James Faulkner, Sándor Técsy, Greg Plitt, Jonathan Dokuchitz, Susan Haskell, Neal Huff, Jason Butler Harner, Amy Wright, Matthew Humphreys, Karron Graves, Robert Prescott, Ann Hampton Callaway, Fidel Castro, Zeke Hawkins, Adolf Hitler, John F. Kennedy, Kent Moran, Josh Pence	
D E C E M B E R	22	Night at the Museum	20th Century Fox / 1492 Pictures	Shawn Levy (director); Thomas Lennon, Robert Ben Garant (screenplay); Ben Stiller, Carla Gugino, Dick Van Dyke, Robin Williams, Mickey Rooney, Bill Cobbs, Ricky Gervais, Owen Wilson, Jake Cherry, Steve Coogan, Patrick Gallagher, Kim Raver, Charlie Murphy, Paul Rudd, Rami Malek, Pierfrancesco Favino, Mizuo Peck, Anne Meara, Pat Kiernan, Matthew Walker, Brad Garrett, Crystal the Monkey, Darren Shahlavi	
D E C E M B E R	22	We Are Marshall	Warner Bros. Pictures / Legendary Pictures	McG (director); Jamie Linden (screenplay); Matthew McConaughey, Matthew Fox, Ian McShane, Anthony Mackie, Kate Mara, January Jones, Brian Geraghty, David Strathairn, Arlen Escarpeta, Kimberly Williams-Paisley, Mike Pniewski, Robert Patrick, Brett Rice, Wes Brown, Elisabeth Omilami, Jody Thompson, Rhoda Griffis, Georgia Gov. Sonny Perdue	
D E C E M B E R	25	Black Christmas	Metro-Goldwyn-Mayer / Dimension Films / 2929 Entertainment / Hard Eight Pictures	Glen Morgan (director/screenplay); Katie Cassidy, Michelle Trachtenberg, Mary Elizabeth Winstead, Oliver Hudson, Lacey Chabert, Kristen Cloke, Andrea Martin, Crystal Lowe, Karin Konoval, Jessica Harmon, Leela Savasta, Cainan Wiebe, Michael Adamthwaite, Peter New, Juan Riedinger, Jill Teed, Jerry Wasserman, Evan Adams, Anne Marie DeLuise, Greg Kean, Dean Friss, Robert Mann, Kathleen Kole, Howard Siegel, Peter Wilds	
D E C E M B E R	25	Children of Men	Universal Pictures / Strike Entertainment	Alfonso Cuarón (director/screenplay); Mark Fergus, Hawk Ostby, Timothy J. Sexton, David Arata (screenplay); Clive Owen, Julianne Moore, Clare-Hope Ashitey, Michael Caine, Chiwetel Ejiofor, Charlie Hunnam, Pam Ferris, Peter Mullan, Danny Huston, Oana Pellea, Paul Sharma, Jacek Koman, Ed Westwick, Maria McErlane, Miriam Karlin, Philippa Urquhart, Tehmina Sunny, Michael Klesic, Dhaffer L'Abidine, Nabil Shaban, Goran Kostić, Andrew Brooke, Nihal Arthanayake,	
D E C E M B E R	25	Notes on a Scandal	Fox Searchlight Pictures	Richard Eyre (director); Patrick Marber (screenplay); Judi Dench, Cate Blanchett, Bill Nighy, Andrew Simpson, Tom Georgeson, Michael Maloney, Joanna Scanlan, Shaun Parkes, Emma Williams, Phil Davis, Juno Temple, Max Lewis, Anne-Marie Duff, Julia McKenzie, Tameka Empson, Debra Gillett, Adrian Scarborough, Jill Baker, Alice Bird, Benedict Taylor, Stephen Kennedy, Derbhle Crotty	
D E C E M B E R	27	Perfume: The Story of a Murderer	DreamWorks Pictures / Summit Entertainment	Tom Tykwer (director/screenplay); Andrew Birkin, Bernd Eichinger (screenplay); Ben Whishaw, Alan Rickman, Rachel Hurd-Wood, Dustin Hoffman, Sian Thomas, Sam Douglas, Corinna Harfouch, Birgit Minichmayr, David Calder, Jessica Schwarz, Sara Forestier, Karoline Herfurth, John Hurt, Joanna Griffiths, Timothy Davies, Paul Berrondo, Carlos Gramaje	
D E C E M B E R	29	The Dead Girl	First Look International	Karen Moncrieff (director/screenplay); Toni Collette, Brittany Murphy, Rose Byrne, Marcia Gay Harden, Mary Beth Hurt, Kerry Washington, Giovanni Ribisi, Josh Brolin, Piper Laurie, Nick Searcy, Mary Steenburgen, Bruce Davison, James Franco, Christopher Allen Nelson, Donnie Smith, Bobby Hosea, Carla Jimenez, Amy Benedict	
D E C E M B E R	29	Pan's Labyrinth	Picturehouse	Guillermo del Toro (director/screenplay); Ivana Baquero, Sergi López, Maribel Verdú, Doug Jones, Ariadna Gil, Álex Angulo, Manolo Solo, Roger Casamajor, Federico Luppi, César Vea, Pablo Adán	

== See also ==
- List of 2006 box office number-one films in the United States
- 2006 in the United States
