= Naelee Rae =

American actress (born 1996)

- Born: August 25, 1996 (age 29); Boyertown, Pennsylvania, U.S.
- Occupation: Actress
- Years active: 2002–present

Naelee Rae (born August 25, 1996) is an American actress. She is known for her role as the speaking voice of Tasha on Nickelodeon's "The Backyardigans", her starring acting roles include Maddie Hakansovich on the 2006 ABC TV pilot Drift, and she played the role of Allison in Loverboy.

== Filmography ==
- Law & Order: Criminal Intent (1 episode, 2002) (TV): Molly Rowan
- The Practice (1 episode, 2003) (TV): Ashley Markham
- Loverboy (2005): Allison (6 years old)
- The Notorious Bettie Page (2005): Young Love
- Drift (2006 TV pilot) (2006) (TV): Maddie Hakansovich
- The Saint of the Zuiderzee (2007): Mary Clare
- The Backyardigans (28 episodes, 2004–2007) (TV): Tasha (voice)
- The Guiding Light (4 episodes, 2008–2009) (TV): Clarissa Marler
