= Loverboy (2005 film) =

2005 film by Kevin Bacon

- Theatrical release poster
- Directed by: Kevin Bacon
- Written by: Hannah Shakespeare
- Based on: Loverboy by Victoria Redel
- Produced by: Kevin Bacon; Daniel Bigel; Michael Mailer; Kyra Sedgwick
- Starring: Kyra Sedgwick; Kevin Bacon; Blair Brown; Sandra Bullock; Matt Dillon; Oliver Platt; Campbell Scott; Marisa Tomei; Dominic Scott Kay
- Cinematography: Nancy Schreiber
- Edited by: David Ray
- Music by: Michael Bacon
- Distributed by: THINKFilm; Screen Media Films
- Release dates: January 24, 2005 (Sundance); June 16, 2006 (United States)
- Running time: 86 minutes
- Country: United States
- Language: English
- Box office: $53,457 (worldwide)

Loverboy is a 2005 American drama film directed by Kevin Bacon. The cast includes his wife, Kyra Sedgwick, as well as both of their children, Travis and Sosie, the latter of whom has gone on to further her acting career in film and television. The film premiered at the 2005 Sundance Film Festival.

== Plot ==
Most of the story is told in flashbacks from the opening scene to Emily's childhood and adult life.

The movie opens with Emily (Kyra Sedgwick) singing to her 6-year-old son in a car while attempting to teach him the hand positions on a car steering wheel. During this time the scene keeps cutting back and forth to Emily packing a child's suitcase. In the car she tells him that they are about to leave on a journey to an amazing land.

The scene changes and travels to eight and a half years earlier, during which Emily narrates her story on how she conceived her son Paul. She believed that she had only one purpose, to bring life to this earth. After unsuccessful artificial inseminations, she set out seeking numerous sexual encounters with random men all over the country. She theorized that multiple men meant no father, and she wanted it that way. However, after 10 weeks of pregnancy, she begins to bleed at an airport, losing her child and her hope of ever having a baby. Retreating into a state of depression she takes sanctuary at a hotel during a business seminar, where she meets a man named Paul (Campbell Scott). They immediately connect and have a passionate night which results in Emily's second pregnancy.

She buys a house and gives birth to a boy, whom she names Paul, after his father. She spends every waking moment with Paul, reading books to him and searching for buried treasure. She playfully nicknames him Loverboy and he calls her Miss Darling. As he gets older he sees other children going to school and he questions Emily why he was not going too. She tries to keep him away from other children as a means to protect him but as the days go by he becomes increasingly difficult as he attempts to get to school and have fun.

When she finally succumbs to his requests and lets him go to school, she begins to experience separation anxiety; she constantly tries to pull him out of school and Paul, not appreciating this, runs away. When the staff tries to calm Emily, she breaks down stating that her child is exceptional and school is diminishing his potential.

Back in the opening scene in the car, Paul loses his first tooth and Emily makes him sleep in the car, after which she takes a bottle of pills and falls asleep with the car engine running. Emily had blocked the garage door with rags as an attempt to suffocate herself and Paul, believing that this was the only way they could be forever together.

In the morning the boy who mows the lawn finds them. Paul survives; Emily, however, does not.

At the end of the film Paul is older and in a field with his girlfriend, whispering into the ears of the sheep just as he and his mother used to do.

== Cast ==
- Kyra Sedgwick as Emily Stoll
  - Sosie Bacon as Emily Stoll (10 years old)
- Dominic Scott Kay as Paul Stoll (6 years old)
  - Spencer Treat Clark as Paul Stoll (16 years old)
- Kevin Bacon as Marty Stoll
- Sandra Bullock as Mrs. Harker
- Blair Brown as Jeanette Rawley
- Matt Dillon as Mark
- Oliver Platt as Mr. Pomeroy
- Campbell Scott as Paul
- Marisa Tomei as Sybil Stoll
- Melissa Errico as Miss Silken
- Travis Bacon as Lenny
- Carolyn McCormick as Ruth, The Realtor
- Robert Sedgwick as Emily's 3rd Grade Teacher
- Naelee Rae as Allison (6 years old)
  - Valyn Hall as Allison (16 years old)
- John Legend as Memphis Parking Lot Donor

== Critical reception ==
On Rotten Tomatoes the has a rating of 18% based on 33 reviews. The site's consensus states, "The transition from novel to film is awkwardly executed, and Sedgwick's character, despite the attempts to make her sympathetic, merely comes across as creepy and crazy."
