= 18th federal electoral district of Veracruz =

Federal electoral district of Mexico

Veracruz's 18th
- Electoral district of the Chamber of Deputies of Mexico

- 18th district since 2023

Incumbent
- Member: Jonathan Puertos Chimalhua
- Party: ▌Ecologist Green Party
- Congress: 66th (2024–2027)

District
- State: Veracruz
- Head town: Zongolica
- Coordinates: 18°40′N 97°00′W
- Covers: 25 municipalities: Acultzingo, Aquila, Astacinga, Atlahuilco, Camerino Z. Mendoza, Coetzala, Cuichapa, Los Reyes, Magdalena, Maltrata, Mixtla, Naranjal, Nogales, Omealca, Rafael Delgado, San Andrés Tenejapan, Soledad Atzompa, Tehuipango, Tequila, Texhuacan, Tezonapa, Tlaquilpa, Tlilapan, Xoxocotla, Zongolica
- PR region: Third
- Precincts: 217
- Population: 423,573 (2020 census)
- Indigenous: Yes (62%)

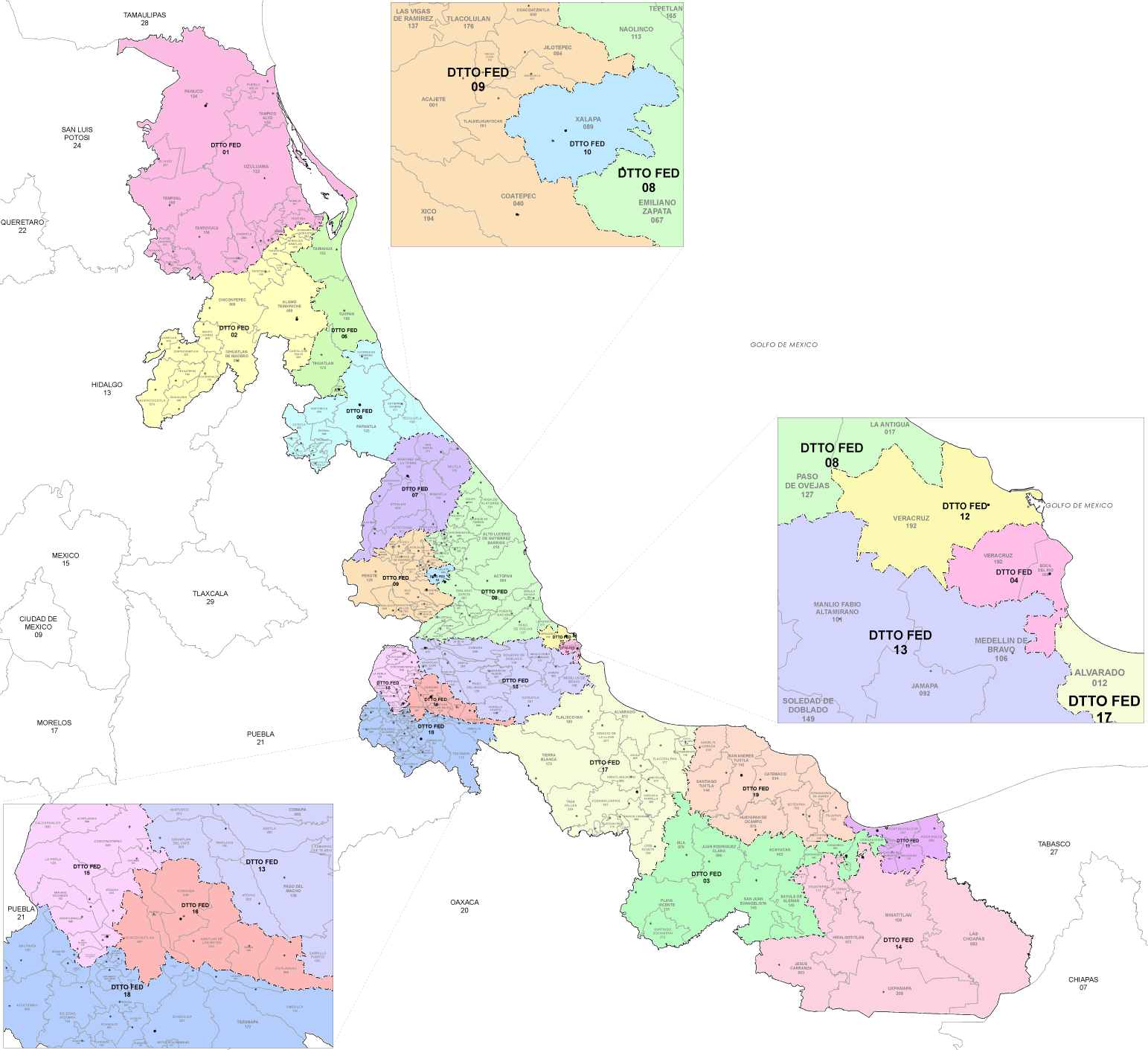
Veracruz's 2023 districts

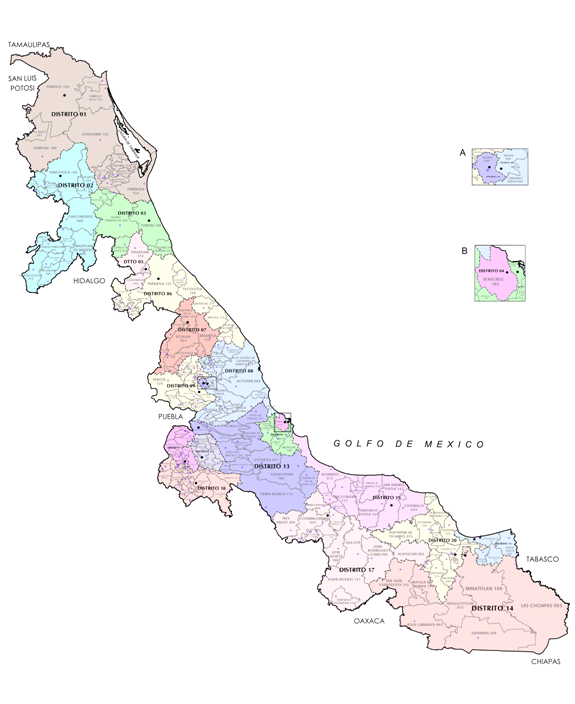
Veracruz under the 2017–2022 districting plan

The 18th federal electoral district of Veracruz (Spanish: Distrito electoral federal 18 de Veracruz) is one of the 300 electoral districts into which Mexico is divided for elections to the federal Chamber of Deputies and one of 19 such districts in the state of Veracruz.

It elects one deputy to the lower house of Congress for each three-year legislative session by means of the first-past-the-post system. Votes cast in the district also count towards the calculation of proportional representation ("plurinominal") deputies elected from the third region.

The 18th district was re-established in 1978 and was subsequently contested in the 1979 mid-term election.

The current member for the district is Jonathan Puertos Chimalhua of the Ecologist Green Party of Mexico (PVEM). He is the alternate of Benito Aguas Atlahua, who was elected in the 2024 general election but was murdered in Zongolica, Veracruz, on 9 December 2024.

== District territory ==
Veracruz lost a congressional district in the 2023 districting plan adopted by the National Electoral Institute (INE), which is to be used for the 2024, 2027 and 2030 elections. The reconfigured 18th district covers 217 electoral precincts (secciones electorales) across 25 municipalities in the state's Mountains region:

- Acultzingo, Aquila, Astacinga, Atlahuilco, Camerino Z. Mendoza, Coetzala, Cuichapa, Los Reyes, Magdalena, Maltrata, Mixtla de Altamirano, Naranjal, Nogales, Omealca, Rafael Delgado, San Andrés Tenejapan, Soledad Atzompa, Tehuipango, Tequila, Texhuacan, Tezonapa, Tlaquilpa, Tlilapan, Xoxocotla and Zongolica.

The head town (cabecera distrital), where results from individual polling stations are gathered together and tallied, is the city of Zongolica. The district reported a population of 423,573 in the 2020 census and, with Indigenous and Afrodescendent inhabitants accounting for over 62% of that total, it is classified by the INE as an indigenous district. (Note: The INE deems any local or federal electoral district where Indigenous or Afrodescendent inhabitants number 40% or more of the population to be an indigenous district.)

== Previous districting schemes ==
Evolution of electoral district numbers
	1974	1978	1996	2005	2017	2023
Veracruz	15	23	23	21	20	19
Chamber of Deputies	196	300				

Because of shifting demographics, Veracruz currently has four fewer districts than the 23 the state was allocated under the 1977 electoral reforms.

2017–2022

Between 2017 and 2022, Veracruz was assigned 20 electoral districts. The 18th district comprised 26 municipalities: the same 25 as under the 2023 plan, plus Huiloapan de Cuauhtémoc, which the 2023 scheme assigned to the 15th district. Its head town was the city of Zongolica.

2005–2017

Veracruz's allocation of congressional seats fell to 21 in the 2005 redistricting process. Between 2005 and 2017 the 18th district had its head town at Zongolica and it comprised 24 municipalities in the same region as the later schemes:
- Acultzingo, Astacinga, Atlahuilco, Camerino Z. Mendoza, Coetzala, Cuichapa, Cuitláhuac, Huiloapan de Cuauhtémoc, Magdalena, Mixtla de Altamirano, Omealca, Rafael Delgado, Los Reyes, San Andrés Tenejapan, Soledad Atzompa, Tehuipango, Tequila, Texhuacan, Tezonapa, Tlaquilpa, Tlilapan, Xoxocotla, Yanga and Zongolica.

1996–2005

Under the 1996 districting plan, which assigned Veracruz 23 districts, the head town was at Zongolica and the district covered 19 municipalities.

1978–1996

The districting scheme in force from 1978 to 1996 was the result of the 1977 electoral reforms, which increased the number of single-member seats in the Chamber of Deputies from 196 to 300. Under that plan, Veracruz's seat allocation rose from 15 to 23. The newly created 18th district had its head town at Temapache in the state's northern Huasteca Baja region and it covered the municipalities of Álamo Temapache, Castillo de Teayo and Tihuatlán.

== Deputies returned to Congress ==
(Mexico) National parties
- Current
- PAN
- PRI
- PT
- PVEM
- MC
- Morena
- PAZ
- Somos
- Defunct or local only
- PLM
- PNR
- PRM
- PNM
- PP
- PPS
- PARM
- PFCRN
- CON
- PANAL
- PSD
- PES
- PES
- PRD

Veracruz's 18th district
Election	Deputy	Party	Term	Legislature
1916	Juan de Dios Palma		1916–1917	Constituent Congress of Querétaro
...
1979	Noé Ortega Martínez	Institutional Revolutionary Party	1979–1982	51st Congress
1982	Silverio Alvarado Alvarado	Institutional Revolutionary Party	1982–1985	52nd Congress
1985	Elvira Rebeca Arenas Martínez	Institutional Revolutionary Party	1985–1988	53rd Congress
1988	Francisco Sánchez Rodríguez	Institutional Revolutionary Party	1988–1991	54th Congress
1991	Juan Bustillos Montalvo	Institutional Revolutionary Party	1991–1994	55th Congress
1994	Roberto Álvarez Salgado	Institutional Revolutionary Party	1994–1997	56th Congress
1997	Marcelo Cervantes Huerta	Institutional Revolutionary Party	1997–2000	57th Congress
2000	Edgar Flores Galván	Institutional Revolutionary Party	2000–2003	58th Congress
2003	Mario Zepahua Valencia	Institutional Revolutionary Party	2003–2006	59th Congress
2006	Pedro Montalvo Gómez (Note: Montalvo Gómez resigned his seat on 14 January 2009 to head the state water commission during the governorship of Fidel Herrera.); María Dolores Ortega Tzitzihua	Institutional Revolutionary Party	2006–2009; 2009	60th Congress
2009	María Isabel Pérez Santos	Institutional Revolutionary Party	2009–2012	61st Congress
2012	Tomás López Landero	Institutional Revolutionary Party	2012–2015	62nd Congress
2015	Lillián Zepahua García	Institutional Revolutionary Party	2015–2018	63rd Congress
2018	Bonifacio Aguilar Linda	National Regeneration Movement	2018–2021	64th Congress
2021	Itzel Alelí Domínguez Zopiyactle	Ecologist Green Party of Mexico	2021–2024	65th Congress
2024	Benito Aguas Atlahua (Note: Aguas Atlahua was murdered in Zongolica on 9 December 2024. His alternate, Puertos Chimalhua, was sworn in on 11 December.); Jonathan Puertos Chimalhua	Ecologist Green Party of Mexico	2024; 2024–2027	66th Congress

== Presidential elections ==
Veracruz's 18th district
Election	District won by	Party or coalition	%
2018	Andrés Manuel López Obrador	Juntos Haremos Historia	51.9247
2024	Claudia Sheinbaum Pardo	Sigamos Haciendo Historia	63.3110
