= Coetzala =

Municipality in Veracruz, Mexico

- Municipality
- Location in Mexico Coetzala (Mexico)
- Country: Mexico
- State: Veracruz
- Demonym: (in Spanish)
- Time zone: UTC−6 (CST)

Coetzala is a municipality in the Mexican state of Veracruz. It is located in the montane central zone of the state, about 90 km from Xalapa, the state capital. It has a surface of 26.32 km^{2}. It is located at 18°47′N 96°55′W.

== Geography ==
The municipality of Coetzala is delimited by Amatlán de los Reyes, Córdoba, Cuichapa, San Andrés Tenejapan, Zongolica, Tequila and Naranjal.

The weather in Coetzala is cold all year with rains in summer and autumn.

== Economy ==
It produces principally maize.

== Culture ==
In Coetzala, the celebration in honor to Santa María Magdalena, Patron of the town takes place in July.
