= Naranjal, Veracruz =

Naranjal
- Municipality
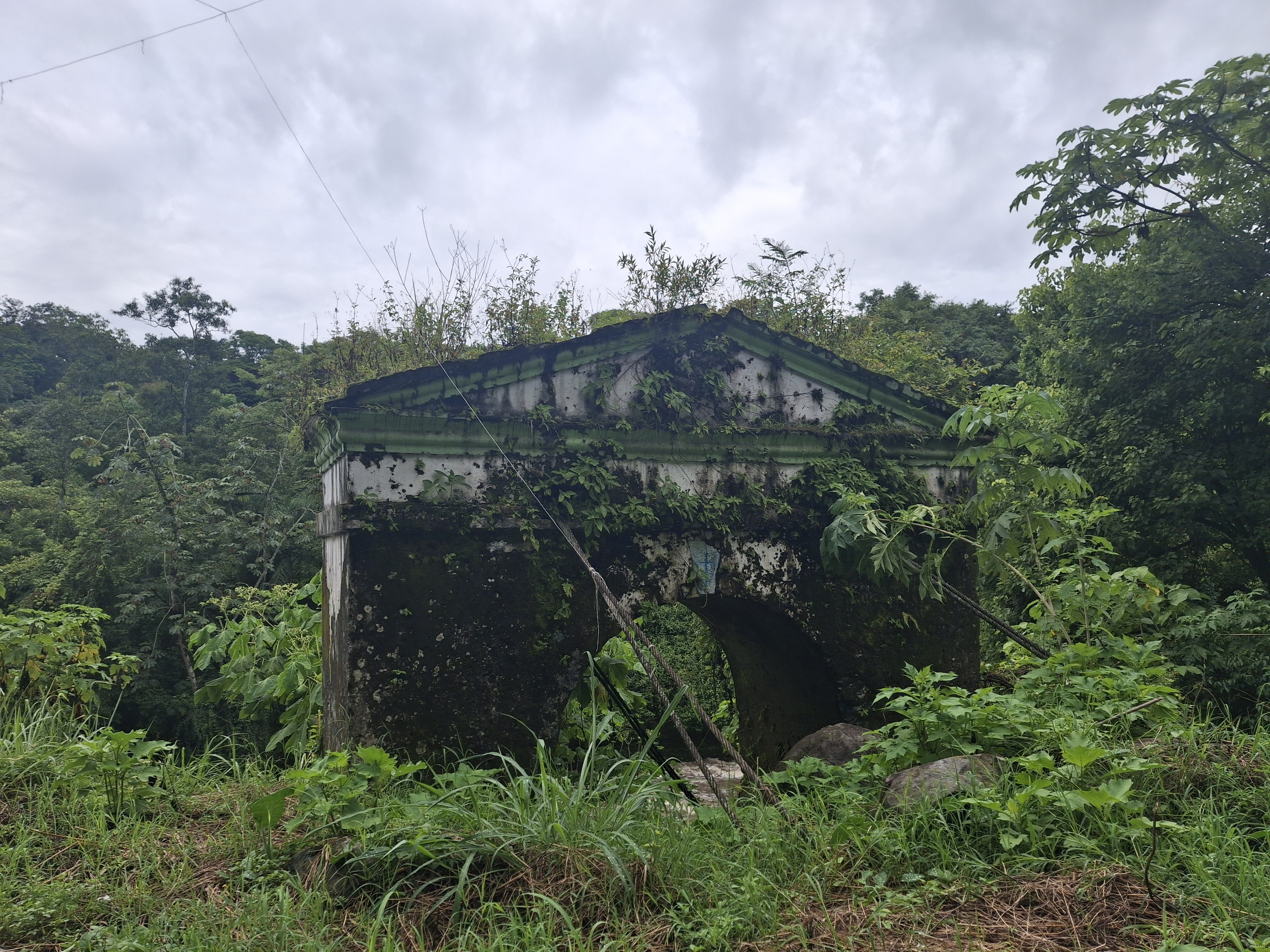
- Rests of a old bridge that used to communicate Naranjal with Córdoba

- Location in Mexico
- Coordinates: 18°48′37″N 96°57′36″W
- Country: Mexico
- State: Veracruz
- Established: 28 March 1831
- Seat: Naranjal

Government
  - President: Karla Nancy Abad Sosa

Area
  - Total: 18.599 km^{2} (7.181 sq mi)
- Elevation (of seat): 696 m (2,283 ft)

Population (2010 Census)
  - Total: 4,507
  - Estimate (2015 Intercensal Survey): 4,559
  - Density: 242.3/km^{2} (627.6/sq mi)
  - Seat: 2,261
- Time zone: UTC-6 (Central)
- Postal codes: 94880–94883
- Area code: 271
- Website: Official website

Naranjal (Spanish: "orange grove") is a municipality in the Mexican state of Veracruz, located 10 kilometres (6.2 mi) south of the city of Córdoba.

== Geography ==
The municipality of Naranjal is located in central Veracruz at an altitude between 600 and 1,500 metres (2,000–4,900 ft). It borders the municipalities of Fortín to the north, Amatlán de los Reyes to the northeast, Coetzala to the southeast, Zongolica to the south, Tequila to the southwest, and Ixtaczoquitlán to the northwest. The municipality covers an area of 18.599 square kilometres (7.181 sq mi) and comprises 0.03% of the state's area.

The municipality is located on the southern bank of the Río Blanco and is watered by that river and its tributaries. Most of the land in Naranjal (90.41%) is used for agriculture. The dominant soils in the municipality are luvisols, acrisols and vertisols.

Naranjal's climate is humid with rain falling mostly in the summer. Average temperatures in the municipality range between 18 and 24 °C (64–75 °F), and average annual precipitation ranges between 2,400 and 2,600 millimetres (94–102 in).

== History ==
Naranjal established its first town council in 1814. On 28 March 1831 it was incorporated under the name of San Cristóbal Naranjal as a municipality in the canton of Orizaba in the state of Veracruz. Naranjal became a free municipality on 15 January 1918.

== Administration ==
The municipal government comprises a president, a councillor (Spanish: síndico), and a trustee (regidor). The current president of the municipality is Karla Nancy Abad Sosa.

== Demographics ==
In the 2010 Mexican Census, the municipality of Naranjal recorded a population of 4507 inhabitants living in 1049 households. The 2015 Intercensal Survey estimated a population of 4559 inhabitants in Naranjal, of whom 71.11% reported being of Indigenous ancestry and 19.61% reported being of African ancestry.

There are 12 localities in the municipality, of which only the municipal seat, also called Naranjal, is classified as urban. It recorded a population of 2261 inhabitants in the 2010 Census.

== Economy ==
The main economic activity in Naranjal is farming. Coffee, bananas and oranges are the main crops grown, comprising respectively 80%, 10% and 7% of the agricultural land in the municipality.
