= David Lozano (playwright) =

American director and playwright

David Lozano is an American director and playwright based in Dallas. Lozano is the Executive Artistic Director of the Cara Mía Theatre Company, where he has been involved since 2002.

== Career ==
Lozano joined the Cara Mía Theatre Company in 2002, but left in 2006. By 2008, the company was in a poor financial position. In order to save it, Raul Trevino, a playwright, approached Lozano with a proposal to produce a play about a 1969 walkout in Crystal City that protested unequal treatment for Mexican-American students. The play, which would be called Crystal City 1969, was based on the experiences of those that participated in the walkout, including Trevino's uncle. Premiering in 2009, Crystal City 1969 was successful enough to keep Cara Mía afloat, and inspired Lozano to return and begin producing works that addressed the socioeconomic difficulties faced by Latino people.

Since 2009, Lozano has focused on producing bilingual plays and elevating Cara Mía to a position of prominence in Dallas and North Texas. The theater has facilitated the premieres of notable Mexican-American playwrights and writers and has collaborated with the local community to become a hub for Latino arts. In 2013, Lozano wrote and directed The Dreamers: A Bloodline, the first in a trilogy called The Dreamers describing the struggles of Latino people and the immigration process. The Dreamers: A Bloodline told a story of Salvadorean emigration, and was produced by interviewing immigrants. The second part of this trilogy, Deferred Action, premiered in 2016 and told the story of a DACA recipient making their way in the United States. In 2017, Lozano directed the play Native Gardens at WaterTower Theatre, another Dallas theater company.

During Lozano's time at Cara Mía, the company has pursued extensive community engagement by backing youth arts programs that support up to 15,000 students per year. Furthermore, Lozano has advocated for greater funding of small arts venues in Dallas, particularly in the wake of a debt financing proposal that would have granted $15 million to the AT&T Performing Arts Center.

== Notable works ==
=== Crystal City 1969 (2009) ===
Crystal City 1969 was produced in collaboration with Raul Trevino and premiered at Cara Mía in 2009. The play opened on the 40th anniversary of the 1969 walkout in Crystal City, where 85 percent of the population was Hispanic. Leading up to the walkout, inhabitants of Crystal City had suffered chronic mistreatment by politicians and law enforcement and abuse was particularly severe in the city's high school, where speaking Spanish was forbidden. The protests portrayed by Crystal City 1969 brought the city's economy to a halt in order to meet demands for equal treatment, and the standoff even received national attention. Political reforms were finally put in place after a period of 5 months. Characters are based on real participants, and the play attempted to capture the reality of the walkouts by relying on first-person accounts to shape its narrative. The play was so successful that it buoyed Cara Mía from near bankruptcy to an annual operating budget of $417,000.

=== The Dreamers: A Bloodline (2013) ===
The Dreamers: A Bloodline is the first in Lozano's immigration-focused trilogy. It tells the story of four Salvadorean women who are fleeing the country during a period of instability from 1979 to 1992. While the plot is simple, the structure is complicated and abstract, relying on extensive symbolism and unusual usage of time and space. The play was produced with extensive historical research that captured key themes and ideas in the experience of Salvadorean immigrants. For instance, the assassination of Archbishop Óscar Romero in 1980 is presented in the early stages of the play. Lozano's research process included interviews with Salvadorean immigrants in North Texas, so that the play would be able to reflect real stories of immigration.

=== Deferred Action (2016) ===
Deferred Action is the second in Lozano's trilogy, and focuses on a DACA recipient in Texas named Javi who is attempting to navigate the political discussion surrounding immigration. Javi is by all accounts an upstanding member of society, but remains in danger because of his undocumented status. The conflict in the play revolves around two presidential candidates: a Democratic Latina senator named Nancy Rodriguez and an oil money-backed Republican named Dale Jenkins. Initially, it seems clear how Javi will side, but on a television appearance he criticizes the DACA in front of both candidates as being a temporary solution that fails to address the long term. In this way, the play criticizes the policy of both major American political parties. Eventually, Jenkins has a dream that transforms into a supporter of broad immigration reform, making the decision between the two candidates less clear cut. As in Lozano's previous work, Deferred Action was produced in part by interviewing DACA recipients and understanding their personal experience as undocumented immigrants.
