= Édgar Flores =

Édgar or Edgar Flores may refer to:

- Édgar Flores (actor), Honduran actor
- Édgar Flores Galván (born 1961), Mexican politician
- Edgar Flores (politician) (born 1986), American politician and attorney
