= Benito Aguas Atlahua =

Mexican politician (1979–2024)

Member of the Chamber of Deputies of Mexico
- In office 29 August 2024 – 9 December 2024
- Parliamentary group: PVEM
- Constituency: 18th district of Veracruz

Municipal president of Zongolica, Veracruz
- In office 1 January 2022 – 28 February 2024

Personal details
- Born: 9 March 1979 Zongolica, Veracruz, Mexico
- Died: 9 December 2024 (aged 45) Orizaba, Veracruz, Mexico
- Cause of death: Assassination
- Education: Universidad Veracruzana
- Occupation: Engineer, politician

Benito Aguas Atlahua (Note: In this Spanish name, the first or paternal surname is Aguas and the second or maternal family name is Atlahua.) (9 March 1979 – 9 December 2024) was a Mexican politician from the Ecologist Green Party (PVEM). He was elected the municipal president of Zongolica, Veracruz, in 2021. In the 2024 general election, he was elected to the Chamber of Deputies for Veracruz's 18th electoral district, where he served from 1 September 2024 until his assassination three months later.

== Early life and education ==
Aguas Atlahua was born in Zongolica, Veracruz, on 9 March 1979. He graduated as a quality-control engineer from the Universidad Veracruzana (UV) in 2002.

== Political career ==
In the 2017 Veracruz state elections he was the PVEM's candidate for municipal president of Zongolica. He came in second place with 6,533 votes, behind the 8,319 received by Juan Carlos Mezhua Campos of the PAN–PRD coalition. (Note: Mezhua Campos was murdered in Zongolica on 23 November 2025.)

He ran again for municipal president of Zongolica in the 2021 state elections, this time for the Juntos Hacemos Historia coalition (Morena–PVEM–PT). He won the election and took office on 1 January 2022 for a four-year term ending on 31 December 2025. On 28 February 2024, however, the Congress of Veracruz granted him a leave of absence from his position to stand for the Congress of the Union as the Sigamos Haciendo Historia coalition's candidate in Veracruz's 18th district. (Note: Veracruz's 18th is classified by the National Electoral Institute (INE) as an indigenous district, and Aguas Atlahua was a speaker of the Nahuatl language and self-identified as Indigenous.)

Aguas Atlahua was subsequently elected to the Chamber of Deputies in the 2024 federal election, receiving 59% of the vote against the 28.5% received by Erika Neri Medina of the Fuerza y Corazón por México coalition (PAN–PRI–PRD). Following the convening of the 66th Congress on 1 September, he served on the lower house's committees for infrastructure, migratory affairs, and Indigenous and Afro-Mexican peoples.

== Death ==
On 9 December 2024, while eating lunch with his siblings in the town of Tepenacaxtla, municipality of Zongolica, Aguas Atlahua was shot at by an individual on a motorcycle. Seriously injured, he was taken to a hospital in the municipal seat and then to another in the city of Orizaba, where he died the same day as a result of his wounds. A second person, a friend of the politician, was also killed in the attack. Aguas Atlahua, aged 45, was survived by his widow and three children.

Members of the Chamber of Deputies expressed their outrage at the killing and observed a minute's silence in memory of their colleague. President Claudia Sheinbaum condemned the attack and offered the governor of Veracruz, Rocío Nahle, the support of the federal Secretariat of Security and Civilian Protection in investigating the crime.

Aguas Atlahua's seat in Congress was taken up by his alternate, Jonathan Puertos Chimalhua, on 11 December 2024.

An arrest was made in the case in June 2025.
