= Pedro Montalvo Gómez =

Mexican politician

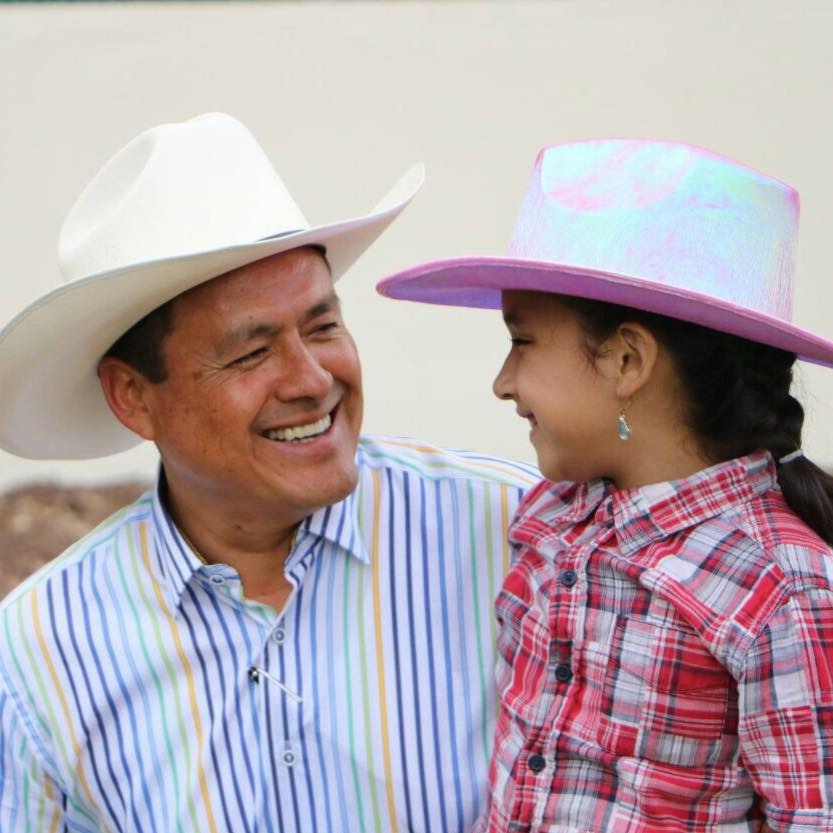
- Born: 2 June 1968 (age 57); Veracruz, Mexico
- Occupation: Politician
- Political party: PRI

Pedro Montalvo Gómez (born 2 June 1968) is a Mexican politician from the Institutional Revolutionary Party (PRI).

In the 2006 general election he was elected to the Chamber of Deputies to represent Veracruz's 18th district during the 60th session of Congress; however, he resigned his seat on 14 January 2009 to head the state water commission during the governorship of Fidel Herrera. He was replaced by his substitute, María Dolores Ortega Tzitzihua, for the remainder of his term.

In 2005–2006 he was the municipal president of Omealca, Veracruz.
