= Maria Santos =

Maria Santos may refer to:

- María Santos, Argentine actress of the 1940s
- Maria Santos (swimmer) (born 1978), Portuguese swimmer
- Maria Amélia Santos (born 1952), Portuguese politician
- María Santos Corrales (1797–1881), Peruvian woman
- María Santos Gorrostieta Salazar (1976–2012), Mexican physician and politician
- Maria Antónia Almeida Santos, Portuguese politician
- María Antonia Santos Plata (1782–1819), Neogranadine peasant, rebel leader and heroine
- María Clemencia de Santos (born 1955), First Lady of Colombia
- María Isabel Pérez Santos (born 1966), Mexican politician
- Maria Santos (All My Children), a fictional character from the ABC soap opera All My Children
