= Battle of Escamela =

- Part of the Mexican War of Independence
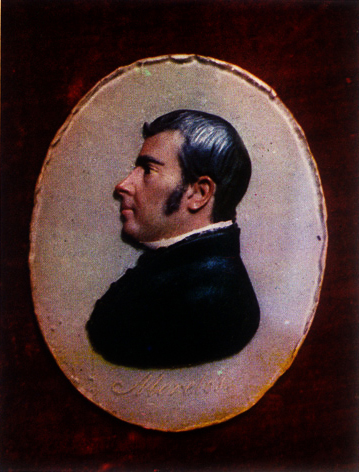
- A artistic depiction of Morelos, the Mexican insurgent commander.
| Date | 26 October 1812 |
| Location | Escamela, Ixtaczoquitlán, Veracruz, Mexico |
| Result | Mexican rebel victory |

Belligerents
| Mexican Rebels | Spanish Empire |

Commanders and leaders
| José María Morelos; Hermenegildo Galeana | José María Añorve de Salas |

Strength
| Unknown | 50 |

The Battle of Escamela took place during the War of Mexican Independence on 26 October 1812 in the area around Escamela, Ixtaczoquitlán, Veracruz. The battle was fought between the royalist forces loyal to the Spanish crown, and the Mexican rebels fighting for independence from the Spanish Empire. The battle resulted in a victory for the Mexican rebels.

== The battle ==
The insurgents, under the command of José María Morelos y Pavón, clashed with Spanish loyalist forces under the command of General Luis del Águila y Andrade. The Spanish troops were made up of peninsulares and loyalists from Nueva Espana. The battle served as a precursor in the broader goal of the Capture of Orizaba later in 1812. The battle resulted in a Mexican rebel victory and an exit of royalist forces from Ixtaczoquitlán.

== See also ==
- Mexican War of Independence
