= Magdalena Municipality, Veracruz =

Municipality in Mexico

Magdalena
- Municipality
- Location in Mexico Magdalena (Mexico)
- Country: Mexico
- State: Veracruz
- Demonym: (in Spanish)
- Time zone: UTC−6 (CST)

Magdalena is a municipality in the Mexican state of Veracruz. It is located in the central zone of Veracruz, about 125 km from the state capital Xalapa. It has an area of 28.79 km^{2}. It is located at 18°45′N 97°03′W.

== Geography ==
Magdalena is delimited to the north by San Andrés Tenejapan and Ixtaczoquitlán, to the east and south by Tequila and to the west by San Andrés Tenejapan.

The weather in Magdalena is cold all year with rain in summer and autumn.

== Economy ==
It produces principally maize and coffee.

== Culture ==
A celebration in honor of Santa María Magdalena, patron saint of the town, takes place in July.
