= Moyoapan =

- Town
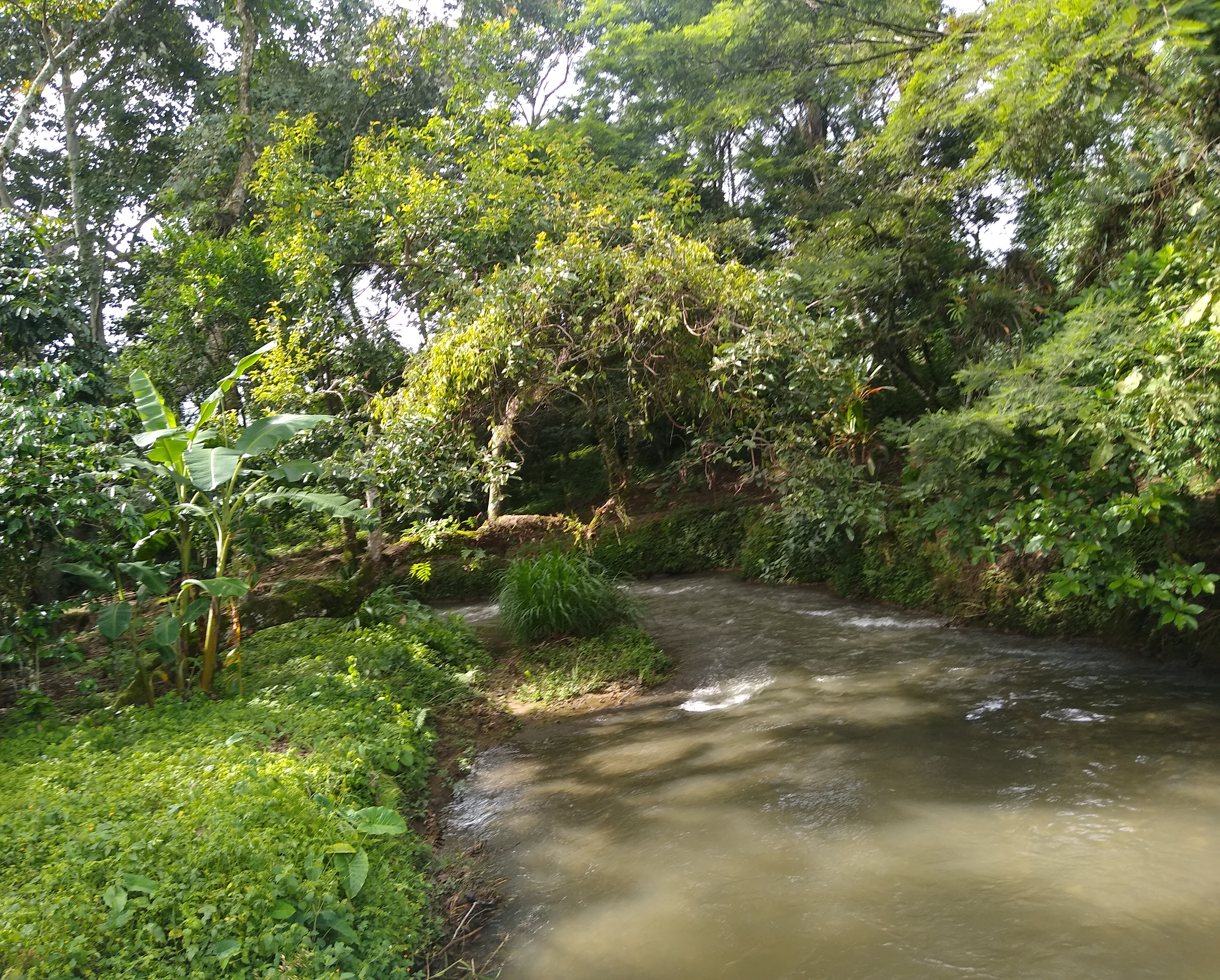
- Stream in the locality
- Interactive map of Moyoapan
- Country: Mexico Mexico
- State: Veracruz
- Municipality: Ixtaczoquitlán
- Elevation: 1,174 m (3,852 ft)

Population (2020)
  - Total: 2,297
- Time zone: UTC-6 (Zona Centro)

Moyoapan is a town located in the municipality of Ixtaczoquitlán in the Mexican state of Veracruz. It is the ninth most populous locality in the municipality, with 2,297 inhabitants. It is located at an elevation of 1,174 metres above sea level.

== Toponymy ==
The name derives from the Nahuatl Moyoapan, composed of móyotl (mosquito) and apan (river), meaning "river of mosquitoes".
