= Tezonapa =

Coordinates: 18°36′N 96°41′W

- Municipality
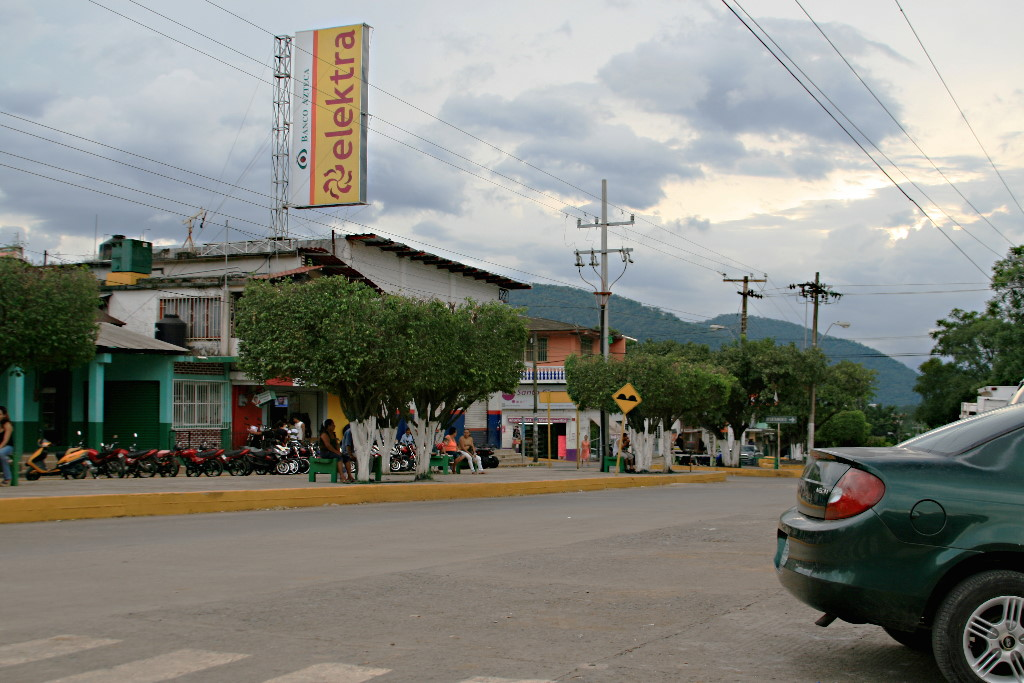
- Avenida Principal in Tezonapa

- Map showing Tezonapa within Veracruz

- Location within Veracruz
- Country: Mexico
- State: Veracruz
- Region: Mountains Region
- Created: December 22, 1960

Area
  - Total: 351 km^{2} (136 sq mi)

Population (2020)
  - Total: 54,537
  - Seat: 5,653

Tezonapa is a municipality located in the high mountain region in the Mexican state of Veracruz, about 219 km from the state capital Xalapa. It covers an area of 351 square kilometres (136 mi^{2}). Law 93 of December 22, 1960, in San Agustín, created Tezonapa's municipality, comprising the congregations of the Josefinas, Prison, Tezonapa, Palmarito, etc.

== Geography ==
The municipality of Tezonapa is delimited to the north by Omealca and to the east and south by Puebla State. The region close to town is watered by the San Jerónimo and Santiago rivers, which are tributaries to the Tonto River, which in turn is a tributary to the Presa Miguel Aleman, better known as La Presa de Temazcal, linked to the Rio Papaloapan.

The weather is hot and humid all year, with rain in summer and autumn. From late April to late May, the dry season creates a hot, dry environment, followed by the storm season, which averages rainfall of 2,000 millimeters.

== Agriculture ==
The region produces maize, beans, orange fruit, sugarcane and coffee. Sugarcane has been the main agricultural product, second to coffee, followed by seasonal fruits such as mango, papaya, banana, orange, mamey, etc.

== Celebrations ==
In June, the celebration in honor of Corpus Christy takes place, and in December, the celebration in honor of La Virgen de Guadalupe takes place. The locals do long "peregrinaciones" (pilgrimage) to La Basilica de Guadalupe in Mexico City and back.

== Roads ==
Tezonapa is linked to Cordoba and Tierra Blanca by paved roads, although the Tezonapa - Vicente Camalote section is bad, most of the rest is okay. From Tezonapa, you can get to many towns in the mountains: La Luisa, La Union, Laguna Chica, San Agustin, Posorrones, Palmarito, Las Josefinas, El Vado, etc... In Laguna Chica, the roads part ways to La Raya Licona and Almilinga, all the way to Tlacotepec de Diaz, Puebla.

== Economy ==
Tezonapa is home to the Ingenio Azucarero Constancia S.A. de C.V. (Sugarcane Processing Plant), which provides much needed jobs to locals. La Zafra (Sugarcane harvest), which in turn provides hundreds of jobs to people living in towns across the region, and both industries are the economic backbone of the entire region, followed by smaller jobs created by agriculture, construction, markets, etc.

== Transportation ==
Autobuses del Palmar, with its headquarters in town, is the only company providing transportation services in the region. They have many destinations, including Tierra Blanca, Cordoba, Tlacotepec de Diaz, Palmar, Las Josefinas, Monte Alto, Almilinga, El Triunfo, Colonia Vicente Guerrero, etc, covering many small towns along their routes.
