= Cuichapa =

Municipality in the Mexican state of Veracruz

- Municipality
- Location in Mexico Cuichapa (Mexico)
- Country: Mexico
- State: Veracruz
- Demonym: (in Spanish)
- Time zone: UTC−6 (CST)

Map of Veracruz, Mexico

Cuichapa is a municipality in the Mexican state of Veracruz.

== Geography ==
Cuichapa is located in central zone of the state, about 90 km from the state capital Xalapa. It has a surface of 69.92 km^{2}. It is located at 18°46′N 96°52′W. The municipality of Cuichapa is delimited to the north by Yanga, to the north-west by Amatlán de los Reyes, to the south by Omealca, and to the west by Coetzala.

=== Climate ===
The weather in Cuichapa is warm-medium all year with rains in summer and autumn.

== Agriculture ==
It produces principally maize and beans.

== Society ==
The Patron of the town is San Isidro Labrador, who is honored with a celebration in May.

== Transportation ==
Cuichapa is home to a station on Tren Interoceánico's Line FA, which opened on 13 September 2024.

Current services
Preceding station	Tren Interoceánico	Following station
Coatzacoalcos Terminus	Line FA	Las Choapas toward Pakal Ná (Palenque)
