= Fortín de las Flores =

- City
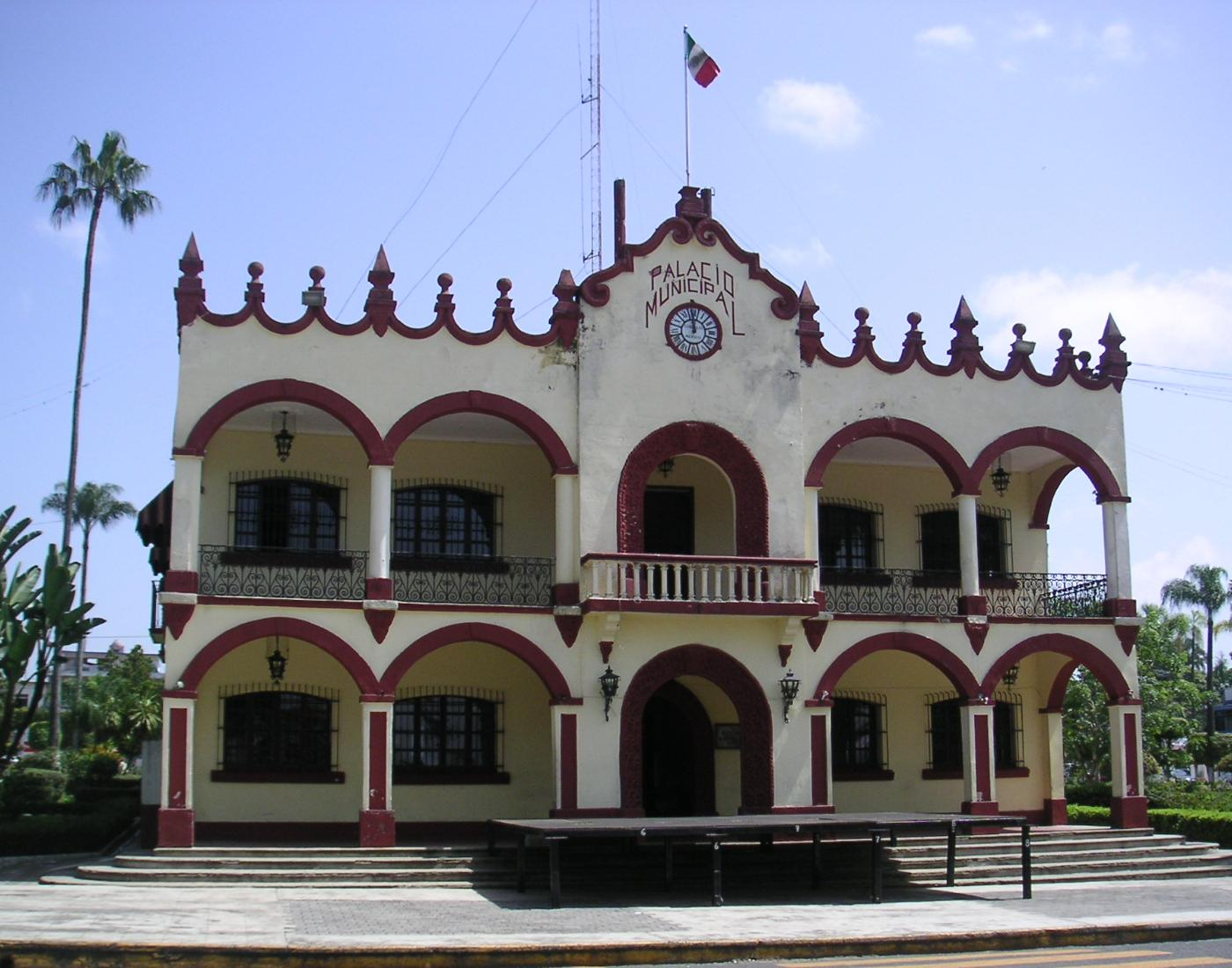
- City Hall, Fortín de las Flores

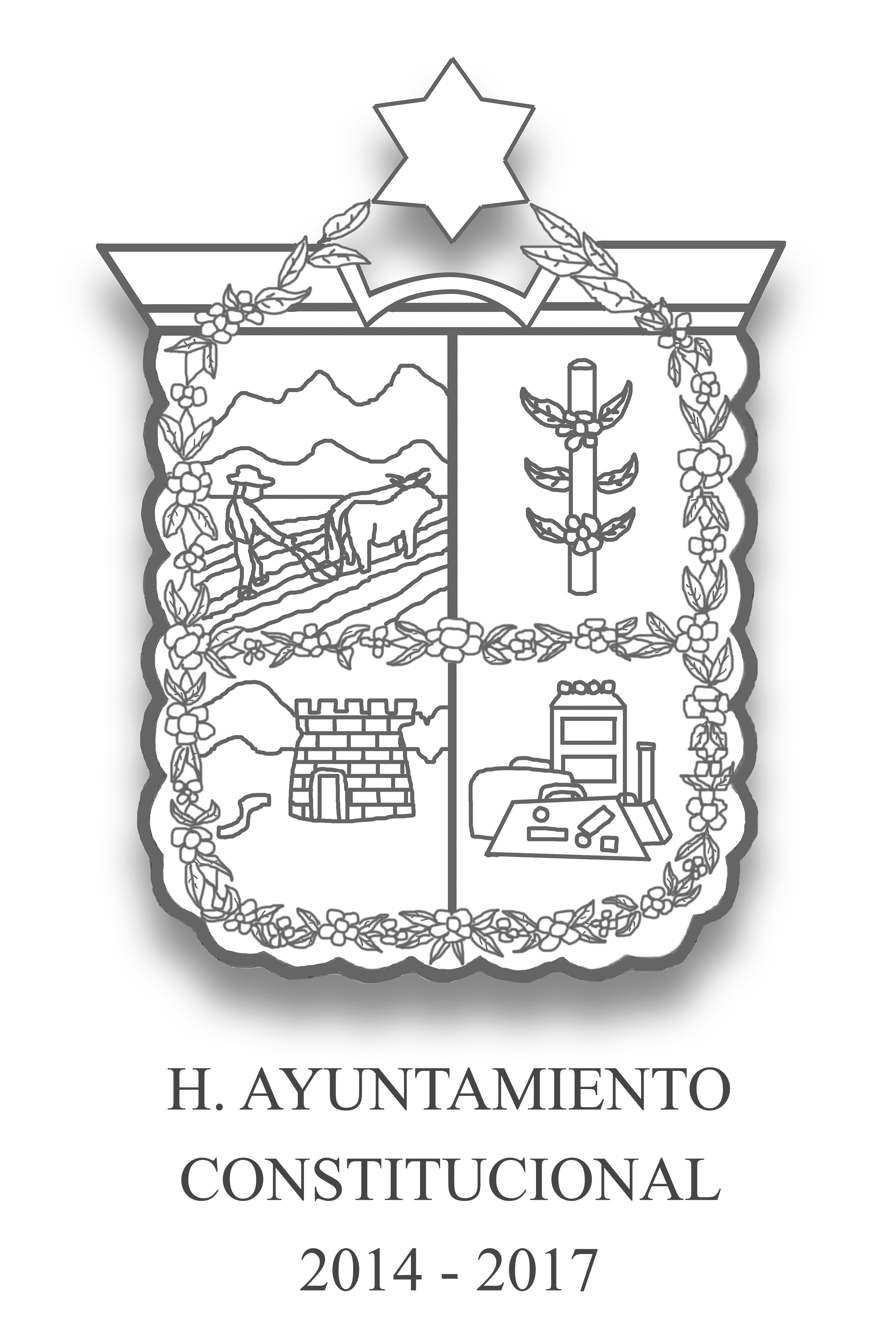
- Coat of arms

- Location within Veracruz Location within Mexico
- Coordinates: 18°54′0″N 97°0′0″W
- State: Veracruz
- Region: Mountains Region
- Municipality: Fortín
- Established: Late 18th century
- Town status: 15 July 1955
- City status: 12 November 1959

Government
  - Mayor: Gerardo Rosales Victoria
- Elevation: 1,000 m (3,300 ft)

Population (2020)
  - City: 21,391
  - Metro: 53,311 (municip.)
- Time zone: UTC-6 (Central)
- Website: fortin.gob.mx

Fortín de las Flores is a city in the Mexican state of Veracruz. Fortín de las Flores is the municipal seat of Fortín municipality, which borders the municipalities of Córdoba, Naranjal and Ixtaczoquitlán. It stands on Federal Highways 190 and 180 and the Mexico City to Veracruz railway.

In the 2005 INEGI Census, the city reported a total population of 18,965, with 53,311 in the surrounding municipality.

The ravine of Metlac, which borders the Cañón del Río Blanco National Park, is the most famous feature of Fortín de las Flores.

The residents of Fortín de las Flores are considered by freighthopping Central American migrants to be some of the most generous in Mexico.

Fortín de las Flores is home to many insects due to its pleasant weather all year round, with minimal fluctuation in temperature, ranging from 20-32 °C daily. Most notably, it serves as a significant habitat for the Mexican colonial orb-weaving spider, Metepeira incrassata.

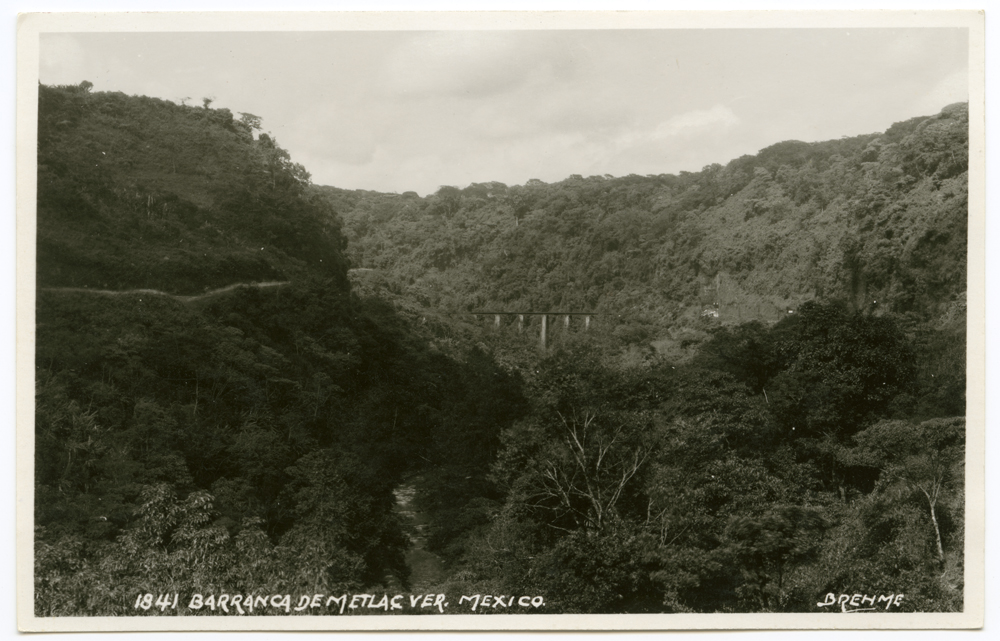
Barranca de Metlac (the ravine of Metlac) on an early 20th century postcard.
