= Gaspar Yanga =

Afro-Mexican slave revolt leader (born 1545)

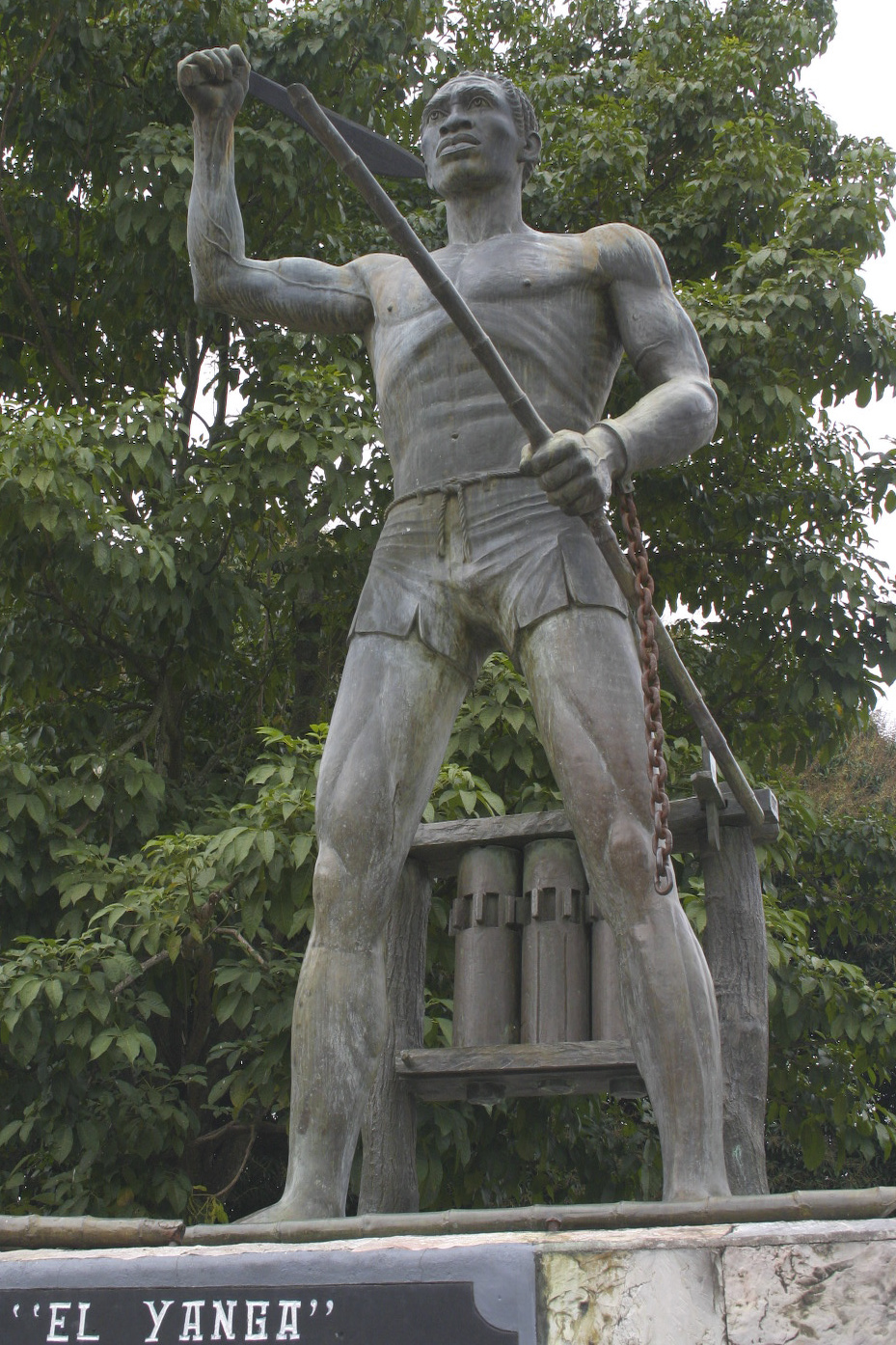
- Statue of Yanga in Yanga, Veracruz
- Born: 1545; Gabon or Angola
- Died: Unknown; San Lorenzo de los Negros, New Spain
- Occupation: Revolutionary
- Known for: Established and achieved self-government for a maroon colony of freed slaves

Gaspar Yanga (born 1545), also called simply Yanga or Ñanga, was a Central African man who led a maroon colony of enslaved Africans in the highlands near Veracruz, New Spain during the early period of Spanish colonial rule. In 1609, Yanga led a successful rebellion against a Spanish attack on the maroon colony. Through negotiation with Spanish colonial authorities Yanga (or his descendants) achieved freedom for the maroon and the right to self-rule sometime between 1618 and 1641. The settlement was called San Lorenzo de los Negros, and was the first free town in the Americas.

In the late 19th century, Yanga was named as a "national hero of Mexico" and "The first liberator of America" ("El Primer Libertador de América"). San Lorenzo de los Negros, located in today's state of Veracruz, was renamed as Yanga in his honor in 1932.

== Early life ==
Yanga, born in 1545, is thought to be of Bantu descent and a member of the royal family of Gabon or Angola in the Congo region, where the name Yanga is more prevalent than in any other region of Africa today. He was kidnapped and sold into slavery in New Spain (colonial Mexico), where he was baptized with the name Gaspar Yanga. By 1640, nearly 150,000 enslaved people had been imported to New Spain, as sugar and textile production drove the demand for slaves. In the Americas, only Brazil had a higher import rate during this time.

== Yanga's Rebellion ==
=== Establishment of maroon community ===
Around 1570, Yanga and a group of his fellow slaves escaped the sugar plantation where they were held, fleeing to the highlands near Mt. Orizaba. The runaway slaves, called cimarrones, built a small maroon colony, or palenque, which grew to a population of about 500 and remained undisturbed for 30 years.

The community survived in part by raiding caravans transporting goods along the Camino Real (Royal Road) between Veracruz and Mexico City, which caused trouble for the local colonial government. After military attempts to quell the raids failed, in 1608 the viceroy Luis de Velasco decided to engage in negotiations with Yanga, who was the palenque's leader. In his list of demands, Yanga asked for freedom for the fugitive slaves of his community, and that they be recognized as a free town with their own council. In return, the community would help catch and return other fugitive slaves.

=== Spanish attack in 1609 ===
Although he had engaged in talks with Yanga, viceroy Velasco also pursued further military action. Led by the soldier Pedro González de Herrera, about 550 Spanish troops set out from Puebla in January; an estimated 100 were Spanish regulars and the rest conscripts and adventurers. The maroons were an irregular force of 100 fighters having some type of firearm, and 400 more armed with stones, machetes, bows and arrows, and the like. These maroon troops were led by Francisco de la Matosa, an Angolan. Yanga—who was quite old by this time—decided to use his troops' superior knowledge of the terrain to resist the Spaniards, with the goal of causing them enough pain to draw them to the negotiating table.

Upon the approach of the Spanish troops, Yanga sent terms of peace via a captured Spaniard. He asked for a treaty akin to those that had settled hostilities between Indians and Spaniards: an area of self-rule in return for tribute and promises to support the Spanish if they were attacked. In addition, Yanga said this proposed district would return any slaves who might flee to it. This last concession was necessary to soothe the worries of the many slave owners in the region.

The Spaniards refused the terms and went into battle, resulting in heavy losses for both sides. The Spaniards advanced into the maroon settlement and burned it. But, the maroons fought fiercely and were well accustomed to the surrounding terrain. The Spaniards could not achieve a conclusive victory. The resulting stalemate lasted years; finally, the Spanish agreed to parley. Yanga's terms were agreed to, with the additional provisons that only Franciscan priests (including Alonso de Benavides) would tend to the people, and that Yanga's family would be granted the right of rule. In 1618 the treaty was signed.

In 1618 he finally negotiated with Spanish officials to grant freedom to the fugitive slaves and independence to their village, located near the village of Cordoba. It became known as San Lorenzo de los Negros (named after the cimarrons) or San Lorenzo de Cerralvo (named after Juan Laurencio, a Jesuit cleric who had accompanied the 1609 expedition sent by the Viceroy). They gave the town of San Lorenzo its "small independence".[2]

By 1630 the town of San Lorenzo de los Negros de Cerralvo was established. Located in today's state of Veracruz, the town has been renamed Yanga.

The black inhabitants of San Lorenzo proclaimed their loyalty to the Catholic Church and the King of Spain, but refused to pay tribute to the Spanish government.

== Legacy and honors ==
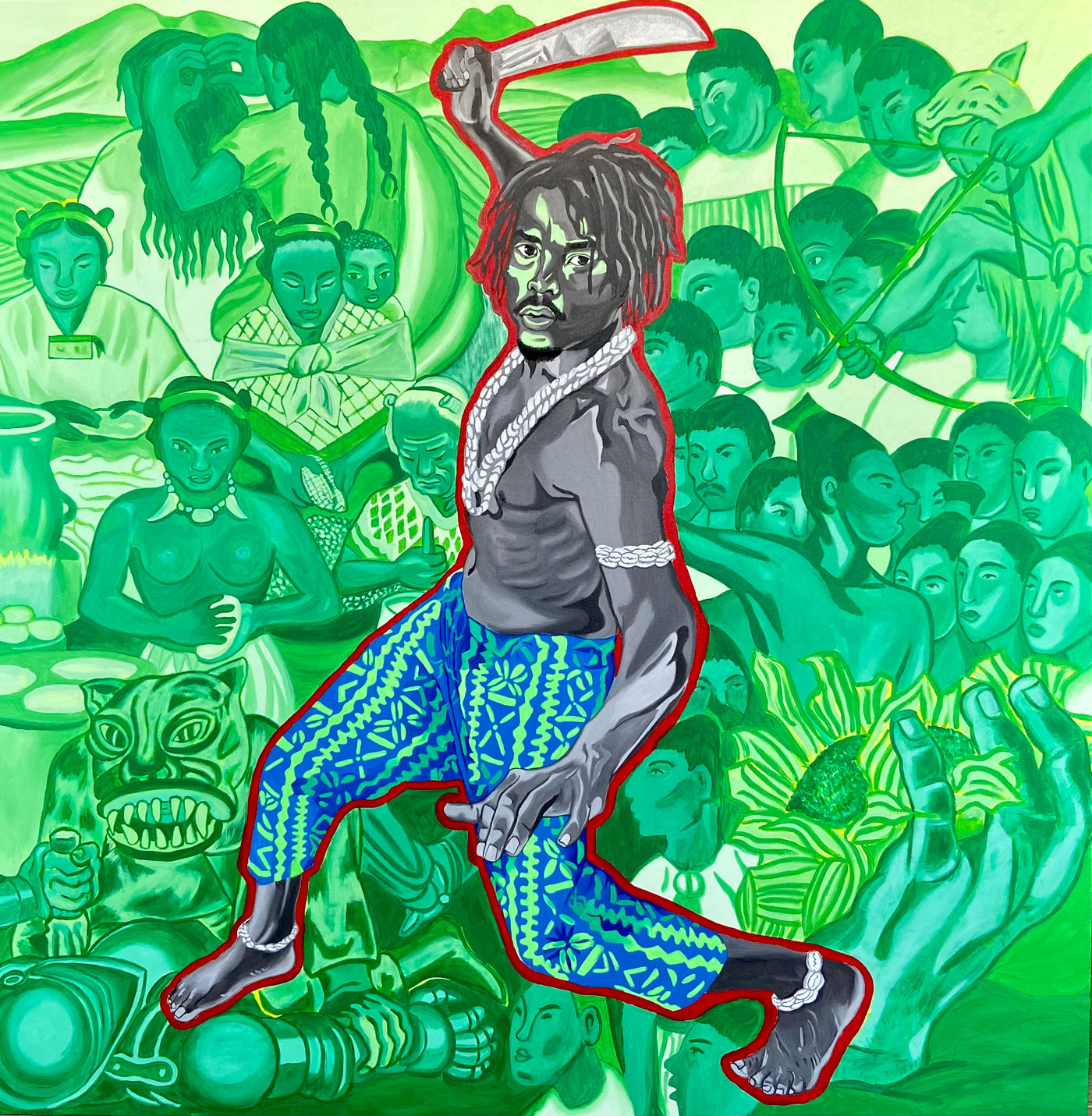
Gaspar Yanga by Herbert De Paz

In 1871, five decades after Mexican independence, Yanga was designated as a "national hero of Mexico" and El Primer Libertador de las Americas. This was based largely on an account by historian Vicente Riva Palacio. The influential Riva Palacio was also a novelist, short story writer, military general, and mayor of Mexico City. In the late 1860s he found in Inquisition archives accounts of Yanga and of the 1609 Spanish expedition against him, as well as the later agreement. He published an account of Yanga in an anthology in 1870, and as a separate pamphlet in 1873. Reprints have followed, including a recent edition in 1997. Much of the subsequent writing about Yanga was influenced by the works of Riva Palacio. He characterized the maroons of San Lorenzo de los Negros as proud men who would not be defeated.

In 2019, Mexican composer Gabriela Ortiz wrote a piece called Yanga, using a text by Santiago Martin Bermúdez. The music reflects Yanga's story and the African cultural roots found in Mexico. It was premiered by the Los Angeles Philharmonic, featuring an orchestra and solo percussionists playing various African percussion instruments, including batás, guiros, shekeres, cabasas, and others.

In 2023, the United States National Endowment for the Arts awarded a grant to Cara Mia Theatre Company in Dallas, Texas to develop a drama about Yanga's story.

== See also ==
- Benkos Biohó
- Vicente Guerrero
- Zumbi dos Palmares
