= Mario Zepahua Valencia =

Mexican politician

- Born: 1 January 1970 (age 56); Veracruz, Mexico
- Occupation: Politician
- Political party: PRI

Mario Alberto Rafael Zepahua Valencia (born 1 January 1970) is a Mexican politician affiliated with the Institutional Revolutionary Party (PRI). In the 2003 mid-terms he was elected to the Chamber of Deputies to represent Veracruz's 18th district during the 59th session of Congress.
