= Córdoba and Huatusco Railroad =

The Córdoba and Huatusco Railroad (Ferrocarril de Córdoba a Huatusco, FCCH) was a 2 ft (610 mm) narrow gauge railway connecting Huatusco with Córdoba. It was opened in 1902 and closed in 1953.

== History ==
The FCCH built in an effort to provide rail service to the Veracruz town of Huatusco from the Ferrocarril Mexicano (FCM) at Córdoba. Julio Limantour was an investment partner in the banking firm of Hugo Scherer Jr. and Company for many years. He was well known in Mexico City’s business circles and abroad. Along with engineer Juan Navarro and Carlos Moricard, Limantour joined in a society to build a railroad line in Veracruz. In 1900 Navarro had acquired the rights to a railroad concession granted in 1898 to build a railroad line to run from Córdoba to Huatusco. The line was surveyed by the son of Porfirio Díaz, and 33 kilometers (21 mi) of 2 ft (610 mm) narrow gauge rails reached Coscomatepec in 1902.

The route across the flanks of Pico de Orizaba required expensive construction. The bridge at Tomatlán was 78 meters (256 ft) above a tributary of the Río Jamapa; and 7 kilometers (4.3 mi) of 3.7% grade with 19 degree (305 ft or 93 m radius) curves were required to reach Coscomatepec from Tomatlán. The construction of the railroad as well as the transportation of passengers, products and supplies were affected by the weather, topography, and infectious diseases, which were more prevalent near the coast. Construction was also delayed by the need for specialized equipment, some of which had to be acquired from firms in the United States and overseas. Funds were unavailable to complete the final 19 kilometers (12 mi) to Huatusco, and the line was sold to the Ferrocarril Mexicano in 1909 after Limantour's death.

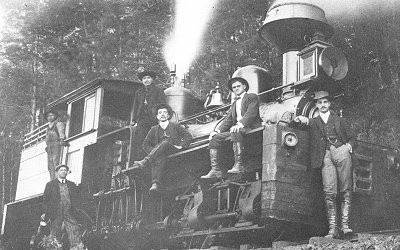
Shay N° 1616 of 1905, built in Lima for S. B. De Mier in Mexico City, used as FC de Atlamaxac N° 3, FC Cordoba-Huatusco N° 4 and finally Ramal de Atlamaxac N° 4

FCM purchased three new passenger coaches for their 2 ft (610 mm) narrow gauge line and transferred a Shay locomotive from their Zacatlán Branch for use as a helper from Tomatlán to Coscomatepec. The locomotives had been built as coal burners with wooden cabs and 150 pounds per square inch (1,034 kPa) boilers, but were later given steel cabs and converted to burn fuel oil. Mixed trains ran through 1951 with a 26-short-ton (23-long-ton; 24 t) 2-6-0 pulling the coaches, a 4-door boxcar as a baggage car, and a flatcar with cloth roof to shade 3rd class seating on a longitudinal bench. Rails were removed in 1953, and Luisa was placed on display in Mexico City. The other two 2-6-0 locomotives were scrapped in 1954.

== Locomotives ==
Number	Builder	Type	Date	Works number	Notes
1	Baldwin Locomotive Works	2-6-0	2/1902	20092	named Elena
2	Baldwin Locomotive Works	2-6-0	2/1902	20140	named Luisa
3	Baldwin Locomotive Works	2-6-0	3/1905	25368	named Beatriz
4	Lima Locomotive Works	28-ton Shay	12/1905	1616	ex-Ferrocarril Atlamaxac #3 acquired 1910 scrapped 1945
