= Édgar Flores Galván =

Mexican politician

- Born: 4 August 1961 (age 64); Temascaltepec de González, State of Mexico, Mexico
- Occupation: Politician
- Political party: PRI

Édgar Consejo Flores Galván (born 4 August 1961) is a Mexican politician from the Institutional Revolutionary Party (PRI). In the 2000 general election he was elected to the Chamber of Deputies to represent the 18th district of Veracruz during the 58th Congress.
