= María Dolores Ortega Tzitzihua =

Mexican politician

- Born: 15 September 1956 (age 69); Veracruz, Mexico
- Occupation: Politician
- Political party: PRI

María Dolores Lucía Ortega Tzitzihua (born 15 September 1956) is a Mexican politician from the Institutional Revolutionary Party (PRI). In 2009, during the 60th session of Congress, she held a seat in the Chamber of Deputies as the substitute of Deputy Pedro Montalvo Gómez, who resigned as the member for Veracruz's 18th district on 14 January 2009.
