= María Isabel Pérez Santos =

Mexican politician

- Born: 10 September 1966 (age 59); Los Reyes, Veracruz, Mexico
- Education: Universidad del Golfo; UPAEP
- Occupation: Politician
- Political party: PRI

María Isabel Pérez Santos (born 10 September 1966) is a Mexican politician from the Institutional Revolutionary Party (PRI).

In the 2009 mid-terms she was elected to the Chamber of Deputies to represent Veracruz's 18th district during the 61st session of Congress. She had previously served as municipal president of Los Reyes, Veracruz, from 2001 to 2004.
