= Córdoba, Veracruz =

Córdoba
- City
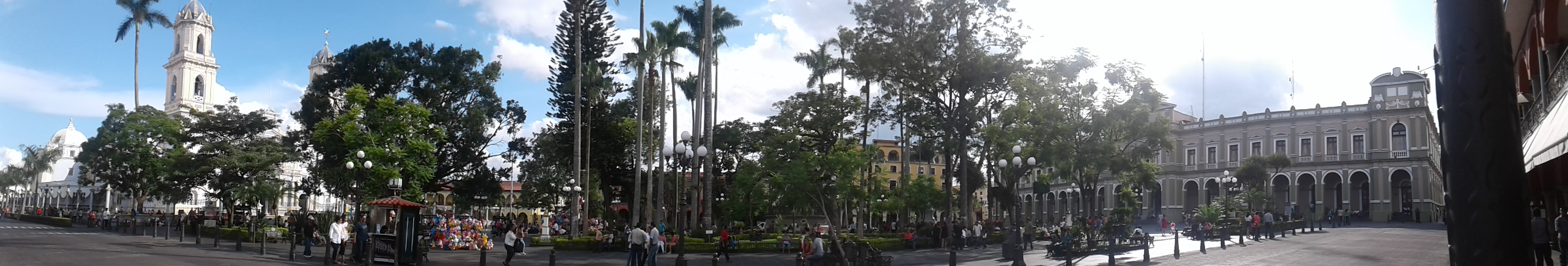
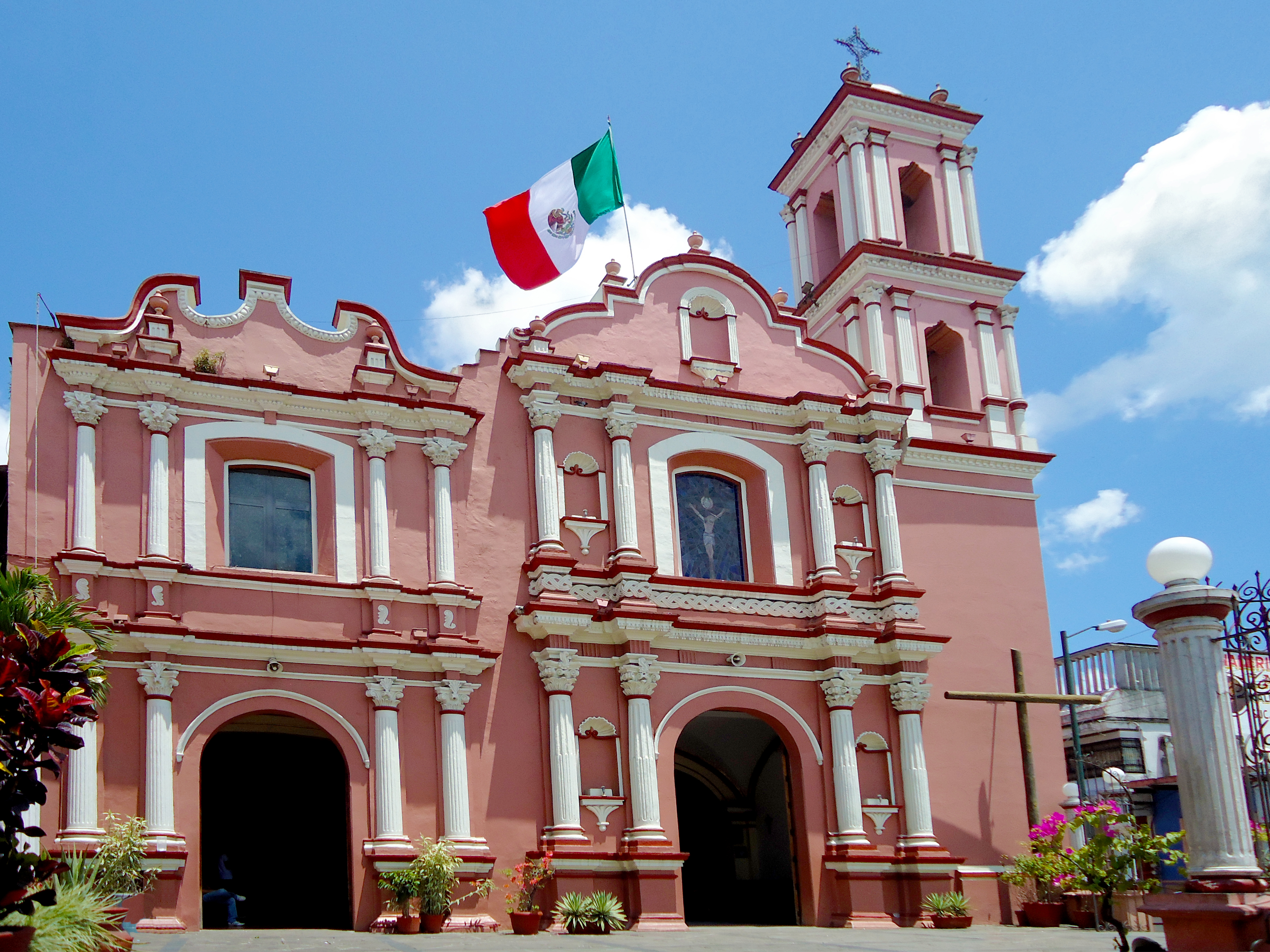
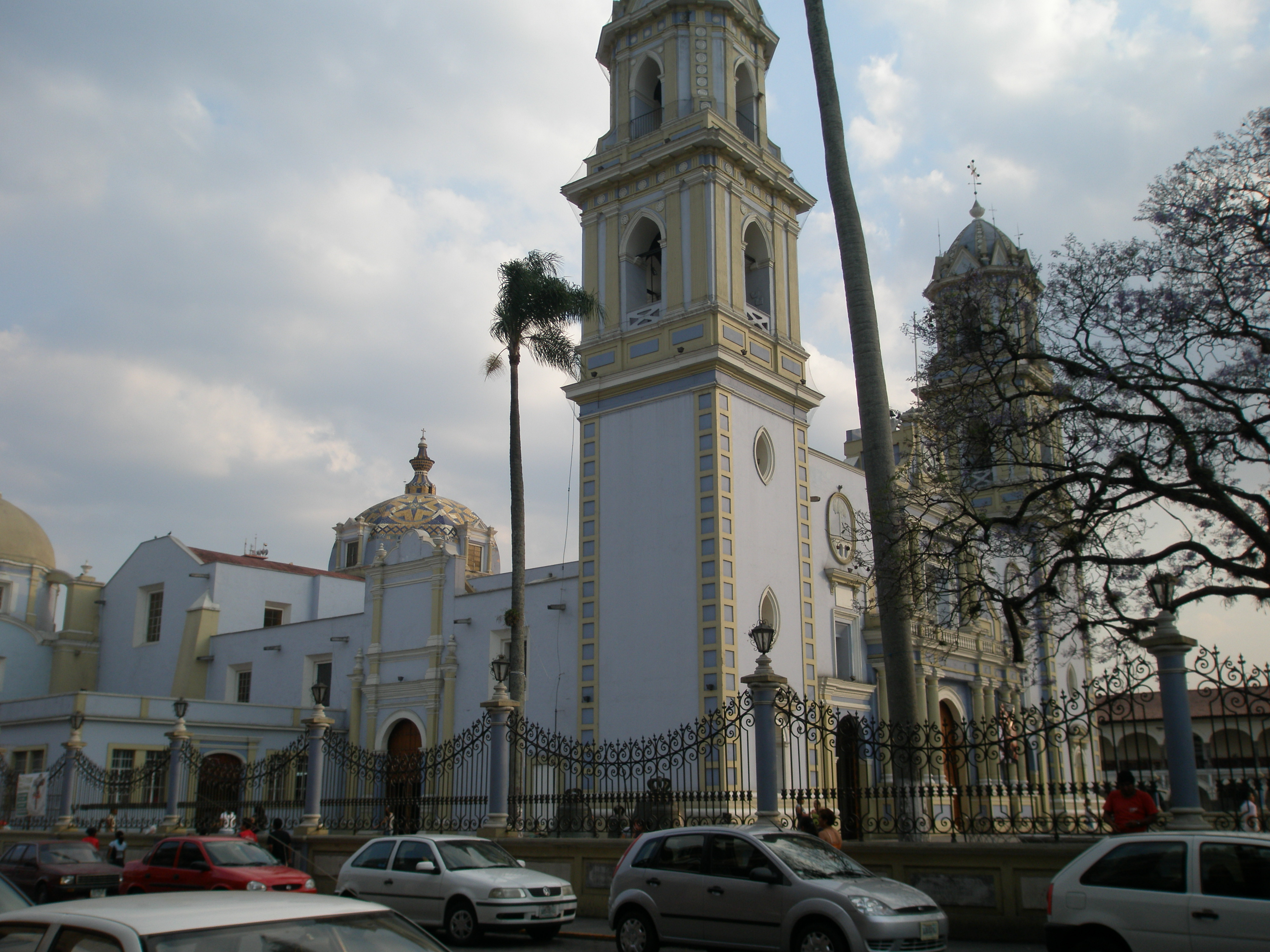
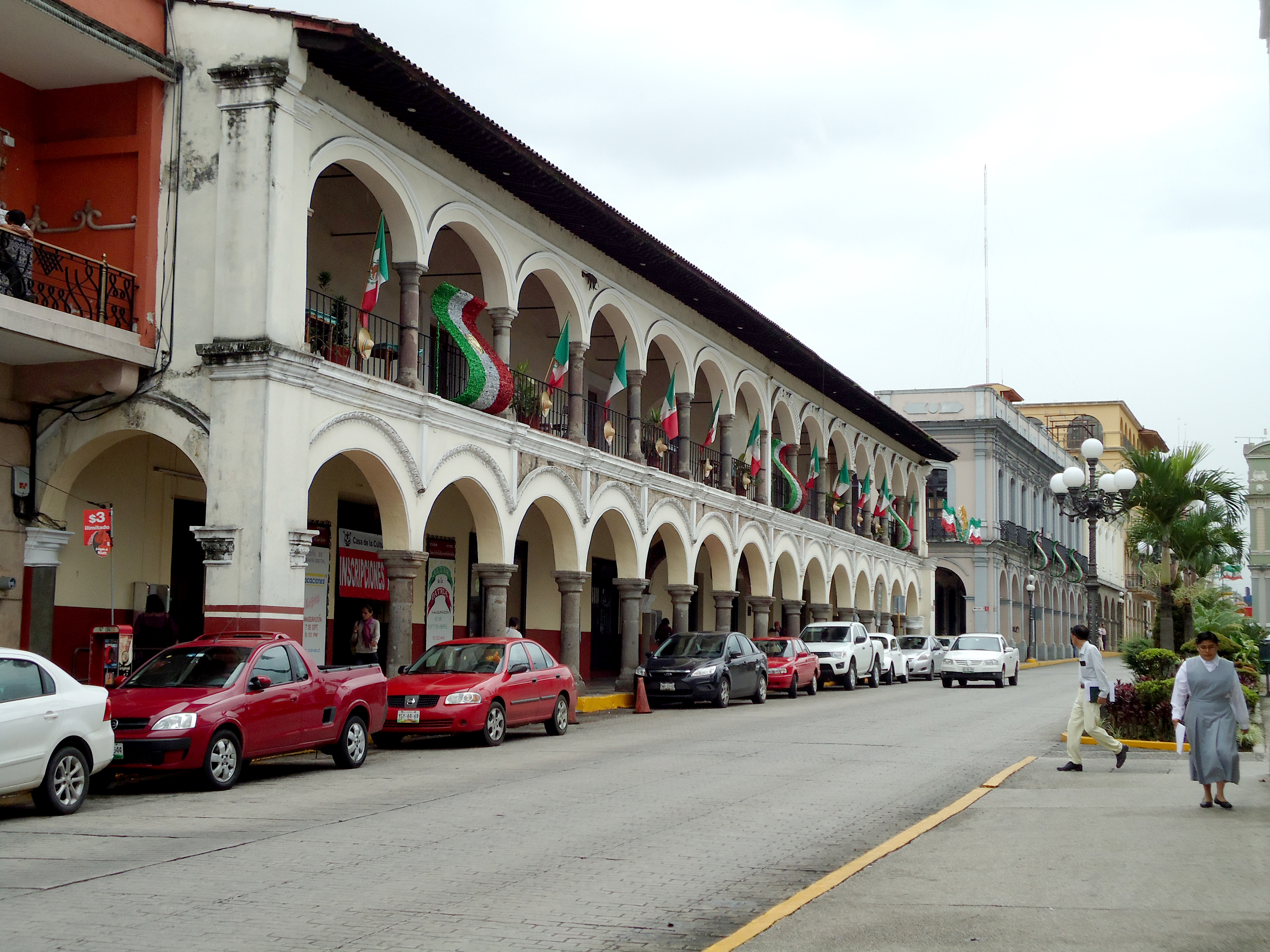
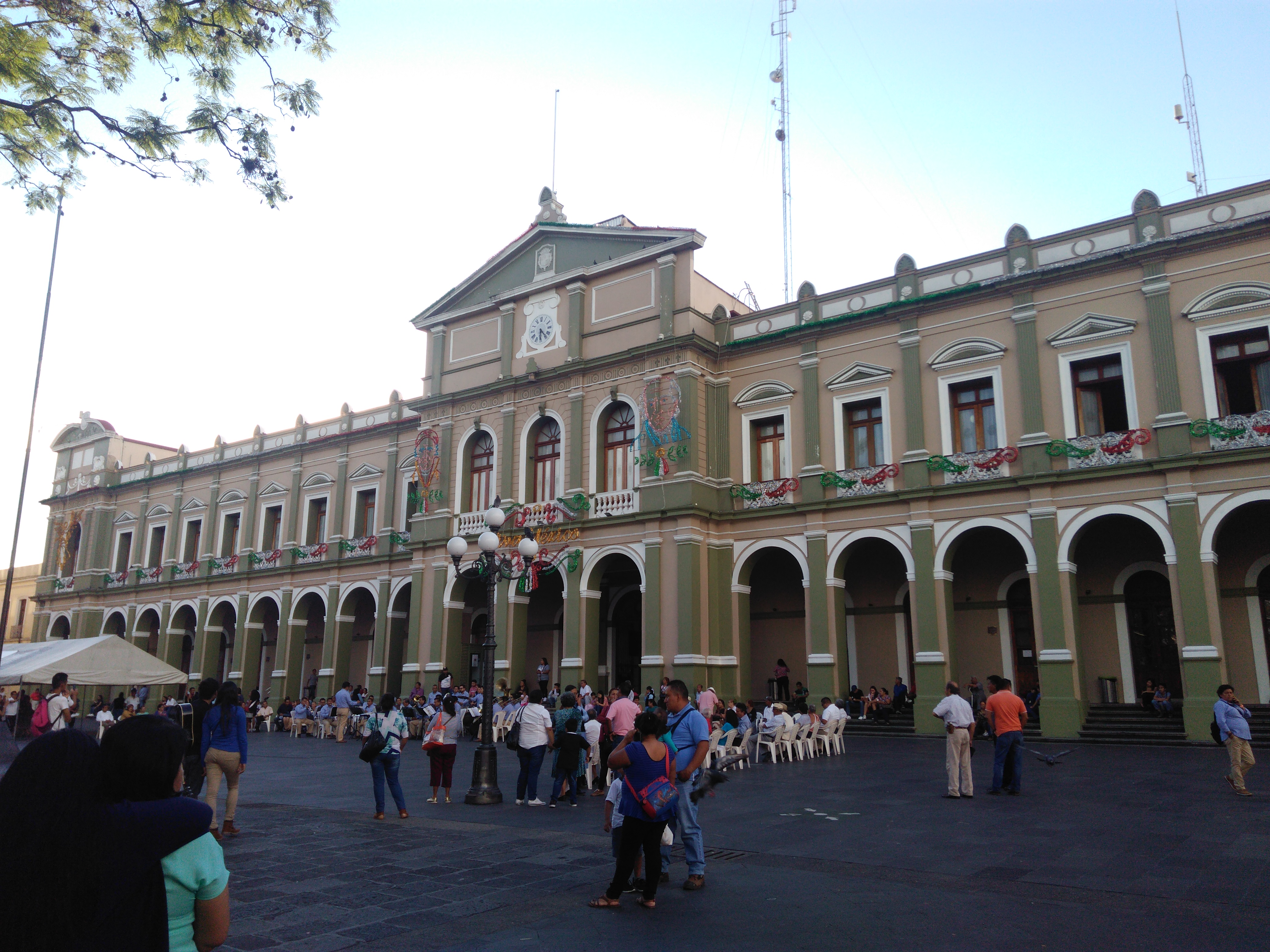
- Top: Panoramic view of Córdoba main square; Middle: San Antonio de Padua Church, Immaculate Conception Cathedral; Bottom: Portal de la Gloria, Córdoba Municipal Hall

- Coat of arms
- Nickname: La ciudad de los 30 caballeros (The City of the Thirty Gentlemen)
- Location within Veracruz Location within Mexico
- Coordinates: 18°53′39″N 96°56′05″W
- Country: Mexico
- State: Veracruz
- Region: Mountains Region
- Founded: 1618

Government
  - Mayor: Juan Martínez Flores (Morena)

Area
  - Total: 159.9 km^{2} (61.7 sq mi)
- Elevation (of seat): 860 m (2,820 ft)

Population (2020)
  - Total: 204,721
  - Density: 1,208.4/km^{2} (3,130/sq mi)
  - Seat: 139,075
  - Metro: 422,487
  - Metro density: 727.63/km^{2} (1,884.6/sq mi)
- Time zone: UTC-6 (Central (US Central))
- Postal code (of seat): 94500
- Website: (in Spanish) cordoba.gob.mx

Historical population
Year	Pop.	±%
1995	168,760	—
2000	177,280	+5.0%
2005	186,623	+5.3%
2010	196,541	+5.3%
2015	218,153	+11.0%
2020	204,721	−6.2%

Córdoba, known officially as Heroica Córdoba, is a city and the seat of the municipality of the same name in the Mexican state of Veracruz. It was founded in 1618.

The city is composed of 15 barrios (neighborhoods) bounded to the north by Ixhuatlán del Café and Tomatlán, and to the south by Amatlán de los Reyes and Naranjal. The western area abuts Fortin de las Flores and the eastern area borders Amatlán de los Reyes and Peñuela.

Córdoba has a municipal area of 159.9 km^{2}. It is divided into 95 localities, of which the most important are San Román, Crucero Nacional, La Luz y Trinidad Palotal, and Colorines.

This city is also known as The City of the Thirty Knights since it was founded by 30 Spanish noblemen commissioned by Viceroy Fernández de Córdoba.

The city boasts of its historical importance, its colonial places and buildings, its cultural centers, parks and its gastronomy. Along with Fortín, Amatlán and Yanga, it forms part of a very important metropolitan area, with a population of 335,850 people as 2020, in the Altas Montañas region to form a large metropolitan area together with the City of Orizaba.

In 2023, Córdoba was designated a Pueblo Mágico by the Mexican government, recognizing its cultural and historical importance.

== Geography ==
Córdoba is located in the center of the state of Veracruz, at 18º51'30" north latitude and 96º55'51" west longitude. It lies between the hills of Matlaquiahitl and Tepixtepec, at an elevation of 817 meters (2,680 feet) above mean sea level.

Its climate is warm and humid, with an annual average temperature of 19.8 °C (67.6 °F). There is abundant rainfall in summer and autumn, with little rain in winter.

== History ==
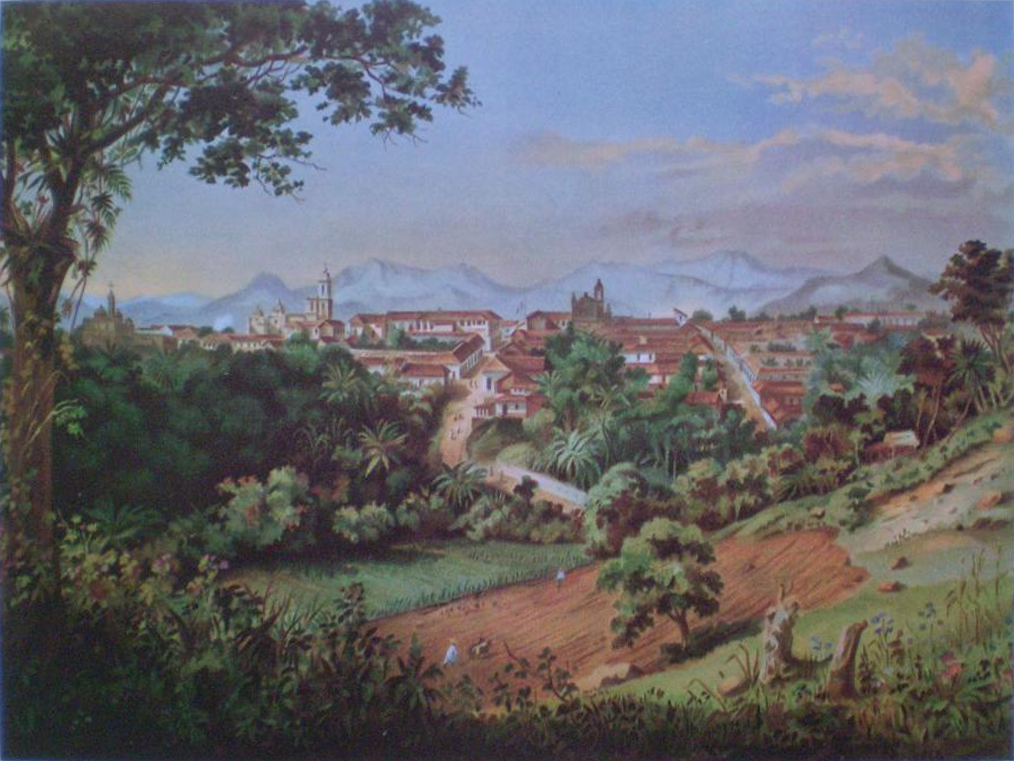
Córdoba desde el camino de Coscomatépec by Casimiro Castro, c. 1877

=== Colonial period ===
The village of Córdoba was founded in 1618 by the Spanish to protect royal interests from attacks by Gaspar Yanga's slave rebellion.

=== Mexican War of Independence ===
After the capture of the city by Mexican rebel forces in August 1821, the Mexican revolutionary Agustín de Iturbide and the Spanish viceroy Juan de O'Donojú signed the Treaty of Córdoba here, ratifying the Plan de Iguala and confirming Mexico's independence.

In 1902 Córdoba became the interchange point of the narrow-gauge Córdoba and Huatusco Railroad to Coscomatepec.

=== Modern times ===
The city was severely damaged by the 1973 Veracruz earthquake.

== Economy ==
The main economic activities are agriculture, ranching, industry and trade. The principal crops are sugar cane, coffee, avocado, orange, lemon, and rice, along with some non-traditional crops as anturios, heliconias and palma camedor.

A highway connects Córdoba with the state's principal port, Veracruz. There is an adequate workforce, with a relatively low annual wage, providing opportunities for hiring for industry.

Córdoba is the focal point for the local sugar milling and coffee processing industries, and it is also an important place for marketing and refining tropical fruits.

Several medical institutions provide public-health services in Córdoba, including the ISSSTE, the IMSS, and the SCSP. There is also a local Cruz Roja (Red Cross) hospital, and several private hospitals.

The city has a large number of entertainment centers, including billiard halls, ballrooms and discothèques. Cordoba has three libraries, three auditoriums, a theatre and a museum.

== Transportation ==
From 1902 to 1953, Córdoba was served by the Córdoba and Huatusco Railroad narrow-gauge railroad. The line operated as a unique and scenic 2 ft (610 mm) gauge branch of Ferrocarril Mexicano from 1909 through 1951.

== Demographics ==
As of 2020, the municipality of Córdoba has an approximate population of 204,721 inhabitants, 139,075 residing in the municipal seat, which represents 2.57% of the total population of the State of Veracruz, which makes it the 6th largest in the state. Other localities include San Román (10,907 hab.), Crucero Nacional (8,479 hab.), La Luz y Trinidad Palotal (3,584 hab.) and Colorines (2,911 hab.).

Córdoba is the seat of Córdoba Metropolitan Area, with another 7 municipalities: Amatlán de los Reyes, Atoyac, Cuitláhuac, Cuichapa, Fortín, Ixhuatlán del Café and Yanga. The metro area recorded a population of 422,487 inhabitants as 2020.

== Notable locations ==
One of Córdoba's most important locations is its zócalo (main square). The square, called the Parque de 21 de Mayo, uses the traditional Spanish layout, with a church on the east side, the Palacio Municipal (city hall) on the west, and commercial establishments on the north and south sides.

The Paso Coyol Ecological Park Spanish: Parque ecológico Paso Coyol is a 4 hectares (9.9 acres) eco-conscious park that was once an abandoned lot.

== Notable people ==
- Diego Fernández de Córdoba, Marquis of Guadalcázar (1578–1630), Viceroy of Mexico, 1612 to 1621.
- Jorge Cuesta (1903–1942), chemist and writer.
- Antonio Modesto Quirasco (1904–1981), politician, governor of Vera Cruz State.
- Rubén Bonifaz Nuño (1923–2013), poet and classical translator.
- Emilio Carballido (1925–2008), writer and dramatist.

=== Sport ===
- Santiago González (tennis) (born 1983), professional tennis player with most ties played for Mexico Davis Cup team.
- Miguel Layún (born 1988), professional footballer with 71 caps for Mexico.
- Raúl Mendoza (born 1991), professional wrestler with WWE.
- Luis Cessa (born 1992), Major League Baseball pitcher.

== International relations ==
=== Twin towns — Sister cities ===
Córdoba is twinned with:

- Baton Rouge, Louisiana, United States, since 2002
