= Águas =

Águas or Aguas may refer to:

== Places ==
- Dos Aguas, a municipality in the Valencian Community, Spain
- Aguas, municipality in Aragon, Spain
- Palace of the Marqués de Dos Aguas, a Rococo palace in Valencia, Spain

== People ==
People with this surname include:

- Benito Aguas Atlahua (1979–2024), Mexican politician
- José Águas (1930–2000), Angolan-Portuguese footballer
- Nash Aguas (born 1998), Filipino actor and Cavite City Councilor
- Rui Águas (footballer) (born 1960), Angolan-Portuguese footballer, son of the above
- Raul Águas (born 1949), Angolan-Portuguese footballer, nephew of José, cousin of Rui
- Rui Águas (racing driver) (born 1972), Mozambican-Portuguese racecar driver
