= Tomás López Landero =

Mexican politician

- Born: 14 March 1950 (age 76); Villahermosa, Tabasco, Mexico
- Occupation: Deputy
- Political party: PRI
- Website: www.tomaslopez.com.mx

Tomás López Landero (born 14 March 1950) is a Mexican politician affiliated with the Institutional Revolutionary Party (PRI). In the 2012 general election he was elected to the Chamber of Deputies to represent Veracruz's 18th district during the 62nd session of Congress.
