= Tequila, Veracruz =

Municipality in Veracruz State, Mexico

Tequila
- Municipality
- Location in Mexico Tequila (Mexico)
- Country: Mexico
- State: Veracruz
- Demonym: (in Spanish)
- Time zone: UTC−6 (CST)

Tequila (Spanish: [teˈkila]) is a municipality located in the montane central zone in the Mexican state of Veracruz, about 90 kilometres (56 mi) from the state capital Xalapa. It has an area of 74.85 km^{2} (28.90 mi^{2}). It is located at 18°43′N 97°04′W.

== Name ==
Its name stems from Te-qui-lan, in the Náhuatl language which means "Place of the Vegetables in the Earth".

== Geography ==
The municipality of Tequila is delimited to the north by San Andrés Tenejapan, Magdalena and Ixtaczoquitlán to the east by Omealca, to the south by Zongolica and Los Reyes and to the west by Atlahuilco. It is watered by small creeks that are a tributary of the Río Blanco.

== Agriculture ==
It produces principally maize and coffee.

== Celebrations ==
In Tequila, during June a celebration in honor of San Pedro, Patron of the town is held, and in December there is a celebration in honor of the Virgen de Guadalupe.
