= Amatlán de los Reyes =

Amatlán de los Reyes Amatlán
- City and municipality
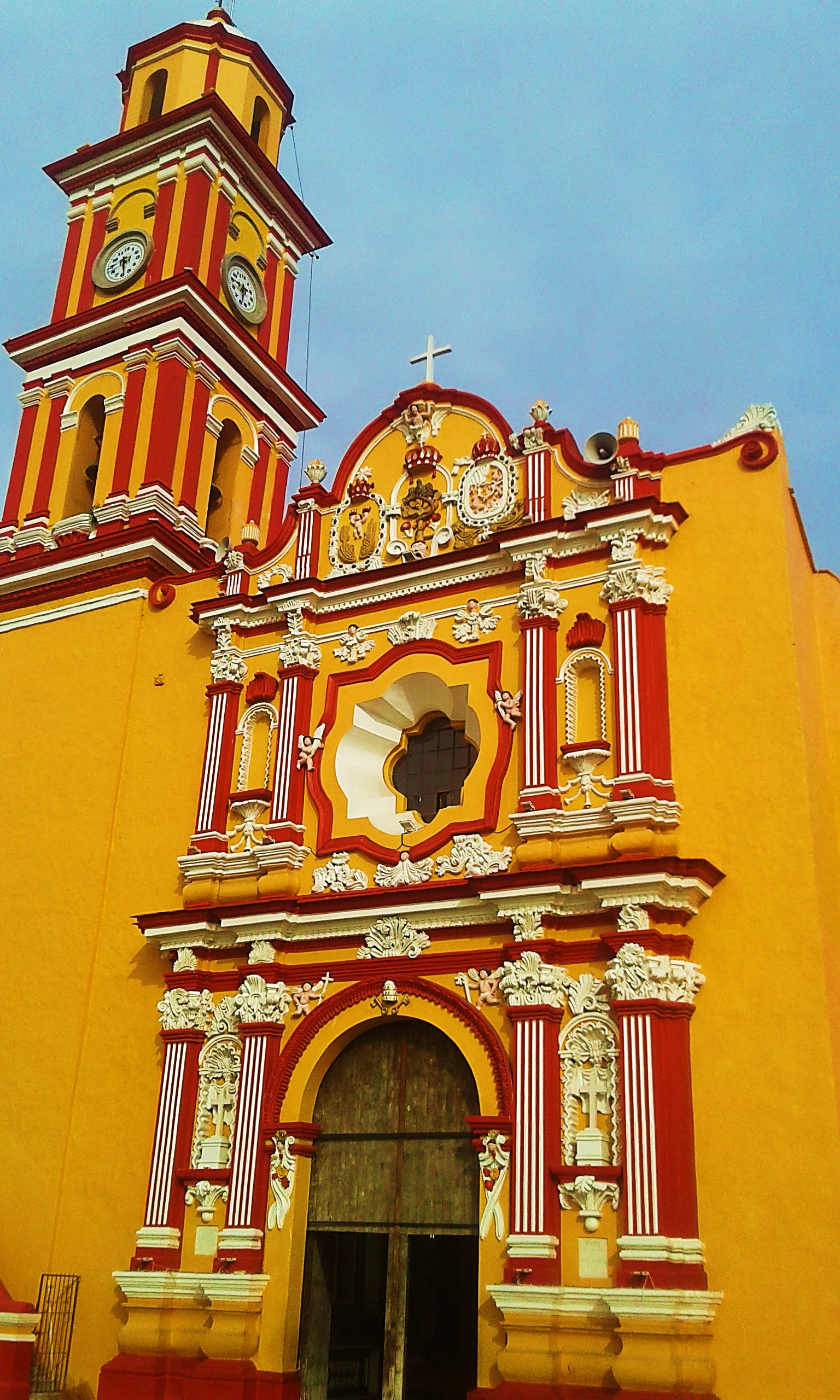
- Parroquia de los Santos Reyes

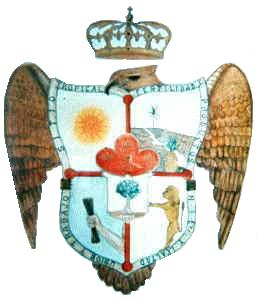
- Coat of arms

- Location in Veracruz Amatlán de los Reyes (Mexico)
- Coordinates: 18°51′N 96°55′W
- Country: Mexico
- State: Veracruz
- Elevation: 740 m (2,430 ft)

Population (2020)
  - Total: 9,123
- Time zone: UTC-6 (Central Standard Time)

Amatlán de los Reyes is a municipality in the Mexican state of Veracruz. It is located about 105.63 mi from state capital Xalapa to the south. It has an area of 148.9 km^{2}. It is located at 18°51′N 96°55′W in the mountains.

== Geography ==
The municipality is delimited to the north by Córdoba Municipality and Atoyac Municipality, to the east by Atoyac Municipality and Yanga Municipality, to the south by Cuichapa Municipality and to the east by Córdoba Municipality,

== Products ==
It produces maize and beans.

== Temple ==
The Temple of the Gentleman of the Sanctuary is located in the town. Its construction dates back to the 18th century. In its main cover they emphasize its fluted pilasters, reliefs of tiara and keys in the spandrels, as well as niches in the interpilasters. The closing is mixtilineal with three medallions to the center with reliefs of an angel, excels the mixtilineal window remetida, surrounded by abundant vegetal decoration.
