= Yanga, Veracruz =

Yanga
- Municipality and town
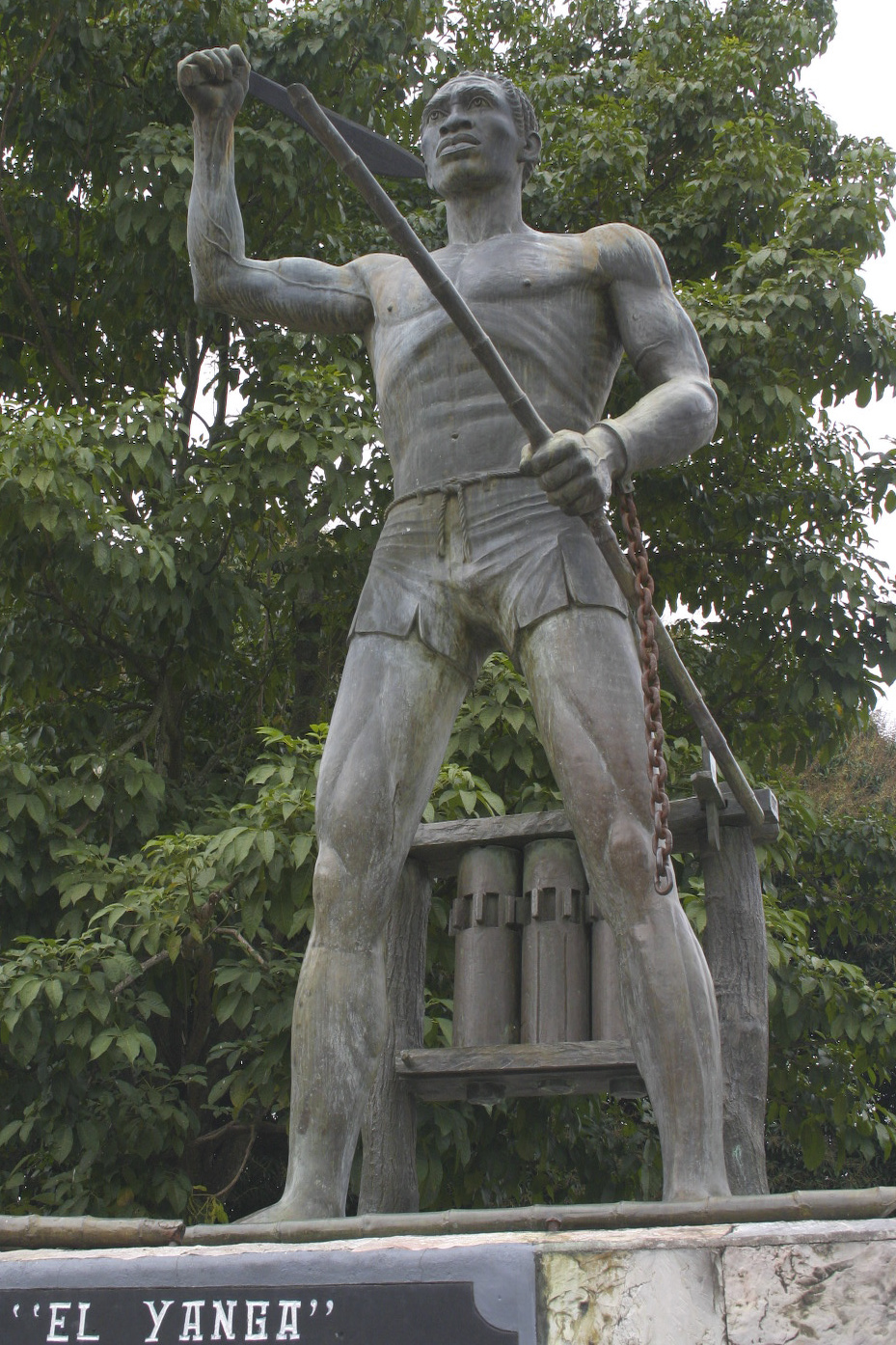
- Statue of Gaspar Yanga in the town

- Coat of arms

- Location in Veracruz Yanga (Mexico)
- Coordinates: 18°50′N 96°48′W
- Country: Mexico
- State: Veracruz
- Region: Mountains Region

Area
  - Total: 102.82 km^{2} (39.70 sq mi)
- Elevation: 483 m (1,585 ft)

Population (2015)
  - Total: 17,896
  - Seat: 5,681 (2020)
- Time zone: UTC-6 (Central Standard Time)

Yanga is a municipality located in the southern area of the Mexican state of Veracruz, about 80 km from the state capital of Xalapa. It was formerly known as San Lorenzo de los Negros (after a colony of cimarrons in the early 17th century) or San Lorenzo de Cerralvo (after a 17th-century Spanish colonial priest). In 1932 it was renamed after Gaspar Yanga, the cimarron leader who in 1609 resisted attack by Spanish forces trying to regain control of the area.

== History ==
Gaspar Yanga is believed to have been a member of a royal family in present-day Gabon or Angola in Central Africa before being sold into slavery and sent to Mexico. At the time Yanga reportedly arrived in Mexico – before 1570 – it is very likely that he shipped by way of Elmina Castle, the first ever European slave-trading post, established on the west coast of Africa in 1482. After leading an escape by a band of slaves in 1570, Yanga and his group settled in the highlands. They fought off Spanish forces in 1609, with further bloody skirmishes over nearly a decade.

In 1618 he finally negotiated with Spanish officials to grant freedom to the fugitive slaves and independence to their village, located near the village of Cordoba. It became known as San Lorenzo de los Negros (named after the cimarrons) or San Lorenzo de Cerralvo (named after Juan Laurencio, a Jesuit cleric who had accompanied the 1609 expedition sent by the Viceroy). They gave the town of San Lorenzo its "small independence".

The black inhabitants of San Lorenzo proclaimed their loyalty to the Catholic Church and the King of Spain, but refused to pay tribute to the Spanish government.

== Geography ==
The municipality of Yanga is bordered to the east by Cuitláhuac, to the north-east by Atoyac and to the south-east by Omealca.

The climate in Yanga is warm and humid, with an average temperature of 18 °C and rains mainly in the summer and fall.

== Agriculture ==
Yanga principally produces maize, beans, sugarcane, coffee and mango.

== Celebrations ==
Every February, a festival is held to celebrate the Virgin of Candelaria, patron of the town. Each December, a festival is held in honour of the Virgin of Guadalupe.

Every August, a carnival is held to celebrate Gaspar Yanga, as founder of the first free, Black autonomous region in the Americas. The 400th anniversary carnival was held in August 2009, four centuries after the Spanish had attacked the settlement.

== Twinning ==
Yanga has expressed interest in being twinned with County Wexford, Ireland.
