= Temascaltepec de González =

- Town
- Interactive map of Temascaltepec de González
- Coordinates: 19°02′36″N 100°02′29″W
- Country: Mexico
- State: State of Mexico
- Municipality: Temascaltepec
- Founded: 1555
- Municipal status: 1835

Government
  - Municipal President: Noe Barrueta Baron (2006–2009)
- Elevation of seat: 1,720 m (5,640 ft)

Population (2005)
  - Municipality: 30,336
  - Seat: 2,253
- Time zone: UTC-6 (CST)
- Postal code (of seat): 51300

Temascaltepec de González (formally: Temascaltepec de González, for Plutarco González) is a city and seat of the municipality of Temascaltepec located in south of the State of Mexico in Mexico. It is 66 km (41 mi) southeast of Toluca and 140 km (87 mi), from Mexico City. Temascaltepec comes from the Náhuatl "temazcalli," which means "steam bath," and "tepetl," which means "hill." The Matlatzincas named the area "Cocalostoc," which means 'cave of crows'.

== History ==
The first people known to live in Temascaltepec area were the prehispanic group Matlatzincas and probably founded the village were the modern town stands. During the Spanish conquest, it was delegated to Andrés de Tapia in 1556, with its first church built in 1559. The town grew after the discovery of silver deposits in 1545, and the area was a rich provider of minerals, including silver during the colonial era until after the Mexican War of Independence. In 1858, by decree of the state government, Temascaltepec was elevated to the category of town, and in 1861 was named Temascaltepec de González in honor of Plutarco González, a leader in the time of La Reforma. However, it is still known simply as Temascaltepec. The population of the town as of 2005 was 2,253.

== Climate ==
Climate data for Temascaltepec de González (1991–2020 normals, extremes 1975–present)
Month	Jan	Feb	Mar	Apr	May	Jun	Jul	Aug	Sep	Oct	Nov	Dec	Year
Record high °C (°F)	38 (100)	33 (91)	38.8 (101.8)	38 (100)	36 (97)	36.8 (98.2)	38 (100)	37 (99)	35 (95)	30.5 (86.9)	30 (86)	31.5 (88.7)	38.8 (101.8)
Mean daily maximum °C (°F)	25.9 (78.6)	27.4 (81.3)	28.9 (84.0)	30.5 (86.9)	30.0 (86.0)	26.9 (80.4)	25.8 (78.4)	26.0 (78.8)	25.3 (77.5)	25.7 (78.3)	25.8 (78.4)	26.0 (78.8)	27.0 (80.6)
Daily mean °C (°F)	15.7 (60.3)	16.7 (62.1)	17.9 (64.2)	19.4 (66.9)	20.1 (68.2)	19.6 (67.3)	19.0 (66.2)	19.0 (66.2)	18.9 (66.0)	18.6 (65.5)	17.4 (63.3)	16.5 (61.7)	18.2 (64.8)
Mean daily minimum °C (°F)	5.5 (41.9)	6.0 (42.8)	6.8 (44.2)	8.4 (47.1)	10.2 (50.4)	12.3 (54.1)	12.3 (54.1)	12.0 (53.6)	12.5 (54.5)	11.5 (52.7)	9.1 (48.4)	7.0 (44.6)	9.5 (49.1)
Record low °C (°F)	−1.5 (29.3)	−3 (27)	1 (34)	1 (34)	3 (37)	4 (39)	2 (36)	4 (39)	2 (36)	4 (39)	1.4 (34.5)	−2 (28)	−3 (27)
Average precipitation mm (inches)	6.5 (0.26)	8.4 (0.33)	9.4 (0.37)	11.8 (0.46)	73.3 (2.89)	211.1 (8.31)	227.1 (8.94)	250.2 (9.85)	237.8 (9.36)	140.1 (5.52)	34.9 (1.37)	3.7 (0.15)	1,214.3 (47.81)
Average precipitation days (≥ 0.01 mm)	1.2	0.5	1.2	1.7	9.5	21.2	25.2	26.9	26.6	17.8	4.4	0.6	136.8
Source: Servicio Meteorológico Nacional

== Notable residents ==
- José Mariano Muciño Juárez - naturalist (1757– )
- Fernando de Portugal - miner
- Lic. Hernando Caballero - miner
- Gonzalo Castañeda - doctor, teacher, writer (1867–1947). Su nombre está en una placa en el arco de la entrada de Temazcaltepec.
- Reynaldo Escobar Castañeda - teacher, doctor, writer (1897–1960)
- Alfredo Borboa Reyes - lawyer, municipal chronicler (1930– )
