= Cara Mía Theatre Company =

American theatrical and educational organization

Cara Mía Theatre Company is a Dallas-based theatre company that focuses on Latino American stories through theatrical productions and educational outreach programs.

The company stages 4–5 productions annually, ranging from classic Latino literature to contemporary works by Latino playwrights, including Sandra Cisneros, Jimmy Santiago Baca, and Cherrie Morraga. Notable past productions include Zoot Suit and Deferred Action, both of which toured following successful runs. The company has also adapted Shakespearean plays, including a bilingual Romeo y Julieta and Espejos, a 2004 reinterpretation of The Tempest in collaboration with Laboratorio de la Máscara from Mexico City.

== History ==
The company was founded in 1996 by Adelina Anthony and Eliberto Gonzalez. Originally established as a Chicano theatre, its goal was to present the stories of Mexican Americans and promote access to Latino literature on Dallas stages.

David Lozano became the Executive Artistic Director in 2002; as a Mexican American, Lozano described his efforts to embrace his roots and understand the "emotional history of the generations of Latinos in the US who came before." Lozano placed an emphasis on collaboration Drawing from his experiences with physical theatre techniques from around the world, Lozano formed a resident ensemble dedicated to devising new work and putting on unique, bilingual theatre. Through the integration of clown, mask, and poetic movement techniques, the 16-member ensemble learned to put on full productions with the goal of highlighting the Latino community.

In 2015, the company collaborated with Jeff Colangelo's Prism Co., which resulted in a series of warehouse performances and "pushed them into the experimental arena of non-verbal, physical theatre." In that same year, Cara Mía worked with the AT&T Performing Arts Center on the Elevator Project, an initiative that allows small companies to produce shows in the Wyly Theatre for limited runs. This opportunity led to the production of Lydia, which centered on an undocumented maid. The company's later collaboration with the Dallas Theater Center made possible one of its most well-known productions, Deferred Action.

== Selected productions ==
=== Crystal City 1969 ===
In 2009, the company opened Crystal City 1969, a show the Dallas Morning News considered "one of the best original works of the year." Raul Trevino had reached out to Lozano about a potential project: a play based on his uncle, Mario Trevino, and his involvement in a school walkout against "unequal treatment for Mexican American students." Lozano decided to pursue the project, even though the future of the company was uncertain and there were "no expectations other than to just tell the story." Through a series of interviews and in-depth research, Crystal City 1969 was developed and opened on December 9, 2009— the 40th anniversary of the school walkout it is based on. During its first run, the show sold out nearly all performances. As a result of the success, the company was able to grow "from a $2,000 bank balance to its current $417,000 annual operating budget" and remain operational, as Cara Mía had been on the verge of closing in 2008.

The play was revived by the Cara Mía Theatre Company in 2016, just before the presidential election, keeping the theme of "Latinos and the struggle for justice" alive.

=== The Magic Forest: An Amazon Journey ===
In 2014, the Cara Mia Theatre Company produced The Magic Forest: An Amazon Journey by Latino playwright Jose Gonzalez, a story based on the lives of real immigrants that incorporated fantastical design elements, masks, puppetry, and music. The family-friendly play follows the journey of three mothers and their hardships as they travel from El Salvador to the United States in hopes of finding a better life for themselves and, most importantly, their children. Theater Jones critic Teresa Marrero wrote that The Magic Forest "brings the wonder into wonderful."

=== Zoot Suit ===
In 2014, Cara Mía became the first company to bring Luis Valdez's Zoot Suit to the state. The musical comedy is based on the Los Angeles race riots and Sleepy Lagoon murder trial of the early 1940s. Critic Jerome Weeks noted that the 2014 production of a 1978 drama still had "pointed relevance." The production marked Cara Mía's first attempt at a musical.

=== Lydia ===
In 2015, the Cara Mía Theatre Company produced Lydia by Octavio Solis as a part of the AT&T Performing Arts Center's Elevator Project. Often compared to iconic American family dramas such as Death of a Salesman, the play is set in El Paso, Texas, and centers around the bond between an undocumented maid and her boss's disabled teenage son. The production received praise from Theatre Jones critic Mark Lowry, who described Lydia as "challenging theatre." After opening at the Wyly Theatre as a part of the Elevator Project, the production moved on to the Latino Cultural Center. It received praise from critics and was considered "a high-water mark in their history."

=== Deferred Action ===
Deferred Action, a drama that addressed the heavy political topic of immigration policy, follows Javier Mejia, a child of immigrants, and his journey as he grows up in America. Although his life is filled with many successes, and his disposition seems incredibly optimistic, a somber shift in the story eventually creates a need in Javier to see a change or a "paradigm shift." His personal conflicts and struggles are underscored by a heated presidential election that unfolds throughout the play.

The idea for Deferred Action was born out of a partnership with Kevin Moriarty, who was inspired to work with Cara Mía after watching their earlier political drama Crystal City 1969. The show served as a second part to a 2013 Cara Mía production called Dreamers, a Bloodline. Eventually, David Lozano and Kevin Moriarty landed on the topic of the DREAMers immigration experience and drew from real Latino activist experiences to create Deferred Action along with co-writer Lee Trull.

The Cara Mía Theatre Company revived the show shortly after its world premiere during their 2017–2018 season. For this revival, the production toured through several Dallas theatre venues, Houston, and Los Angeles's Encuentro de las Americas International Theatre Festival.

== Youth outreach and education ==
The Cara Mia Theatre Company engages with the community of Latino youth in Dallas through after-school programs, residencies, and touring productions.

=== The School of YES! ===
The company developed The School of YES!, an art academy with the mission of giving "young people the skills to say 'yes' to a future of their choice rather than feel pressured into a future defined by their environment." The four-week, free summer program allows young artists to learn from professionals who are not only well-respected but also "look like the students they are teaching." The program is divided into two age levels. Those in the 7-14 age range are considered students, while high school teens in the 15-18 age range have the opportunity to work as paid student leaders. The program's daily schedule involves workshops and classes in various artistic disciplines, such as acting, dance, music, and film. The program focuses on the goal of teaching and encouraging community leadership. According to School of YES! co-director Frida Espinosa Müller, they "teach children how to observe and share their ideas and realize that other people's ideas are good."

=== Workshops and residencies ===
Cara Mía hosts various workshops and residencies that cover a wide range of topics such as puppetry, writing, drumming, and masks. These programs are offered throughout the year and reach out to children from first to twelfth grade.

=== Bilingual touring productions ===
The company tours various bilingual shows across the Dallas area. Many of the shows are educational, addressing topics such as Texas history, Mayan culture, and the Mexican Day of the Dead tradition.
