= Los Reyes, Veracruz =

Los Reyes
- Municipality
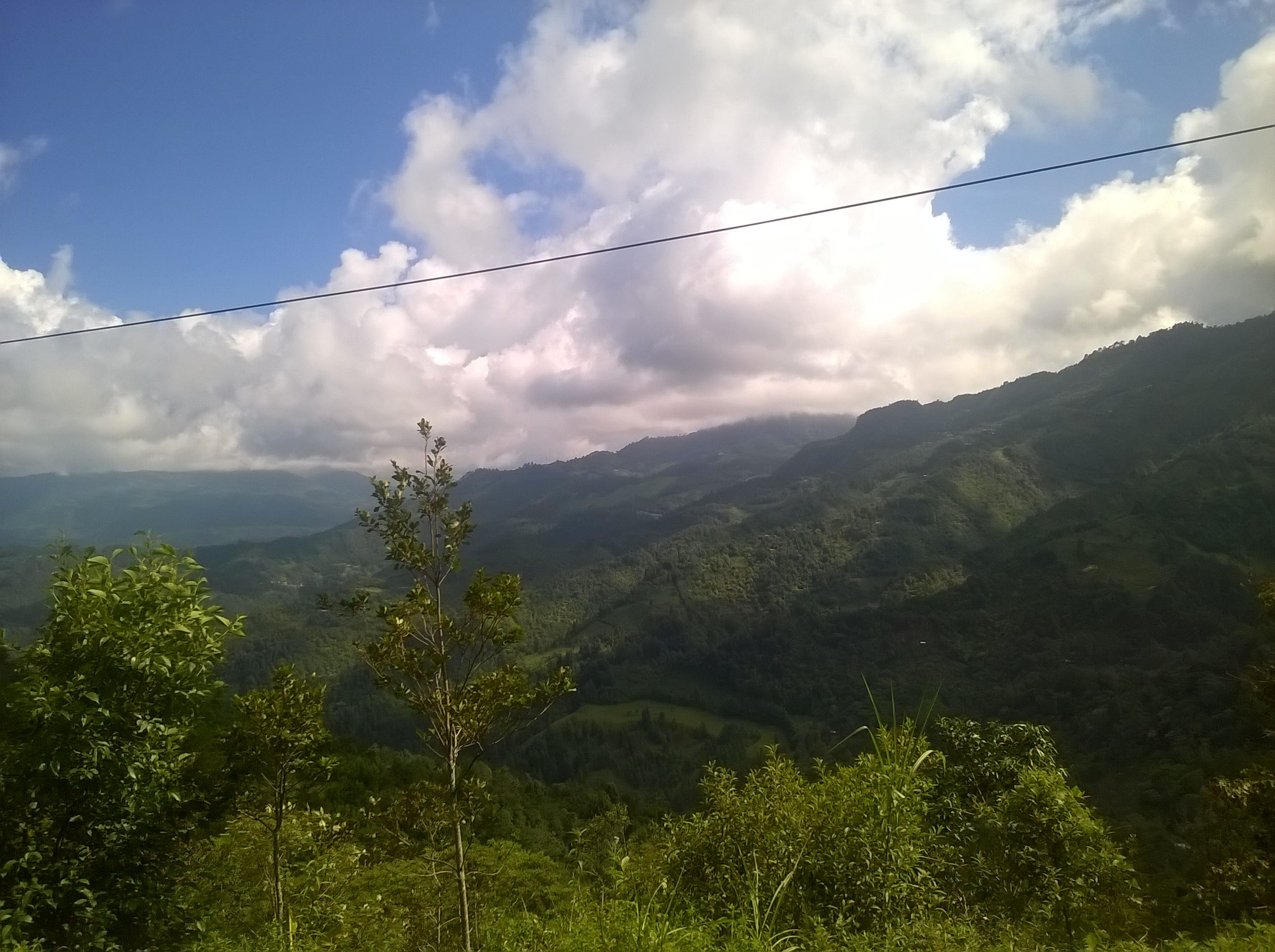
- Mountains in Los Reyes

- Location in Veracruz

- Location in Mexico
- Coordinates: 18°40′23″N 97°02′44″W
- Country: Mexico
- State: Veracruz
- Established: 28 March 1831
- Seat: Los Reyes

Government
  - President: Eclicerio Tequiliquihua Quiahuixtle

Area
  - Total: 33.81 km^{2} (13.05 sq mi)
- Elevation (of seat): 1,776 m (5,827 ft)

Population (2010 Census)
  - Total: 5,484
  - Estimate (2015 Intercensal Survey): 5,830
  - Density: 162.2/km^{2} (420.1/sq mi)
  - Seat: 963
- Time zone: UTC-6 (Central)
- Postal codes: 95060–95066
- Area code: 278
- Website: Official website

Los Reyes (Spanish: "the kings") is a municipality in the Mexican state of Veracruz, located about 100 kilometres (62 mi) south of the state capital Xalapa.

== Geography ==
The municipality of Los Reyes is located in the Sierra de Zongolica, which are foothills of the Sierra Madre Oriental in central Veracruz. It lies at an altitude between 1,200 and 2,600 metres (3,900–8,500 ft). It borders the municipalities of Tequila to the north, Zongolica to the east, Texhuacán to the south, Tlaquilpa to the southwest, and Atlahuilco to the west. The municipality covers an area of 33.81 square kilometres (13.05 sq mi) and comprises 0.05% of the state's area.

The land in Los Reyes is mostly either forested (64%) or used as farmland (33%). Luvisols predominate in the municipality. The municipality is located in the Papaloapan River basin. Federal Highway 123 runs through the municipality from northwest to east, forming part of the municipal border between Los Reyes and Atlahuilco.

Los Reyes's climate is generally temperate and humid. Average temperatures in the municipality range between 14 and 20 °C (57–68 °F), and average annual precipitation ranges between 1,900 and 2,600 millimetres (75–102 in).

== History ==
The original name for the area was Cozcatlán (Nahuatl: "place of jewels"). According to the Historia Tolteca-Chichimeca a group of Nahuatl-speaking Nonoalca known as the Cozcatecah settled in the Cozcatlán area around 1050, which formed part of the historical region of Nonoalco.

On 28 March 1831, a municipality called Los Santos Reyes de Coscatla was incorporated in the area, forming part of the canton of Orizaba in the state of Veracruz. On 4 June 1888 Los Reyes annexed the municipality of Atlanca. Los Reyes became a free municipality on 15 January 1918.

== Administration ==
The municipal government comprises a president, a councillor (Spanish: síndico), and a trustee (regidor). The current president of the municipality is Eclicerio Tequiliquihua Quiahuixtle.

== Demographics ==
In the 2010 Mexican Census, the municipality of Los Reyes recorded a population of 5484 inhabitants living in 1261 households. The 2015 Intercensal Survey estimated a population of 5830 inhabitants in Los Reyes, 98.40% of whom reported being of Indigenous ancestry. In the 2010 Census, 4699 people or 86% of the population in Los Reyes reported speaking an Indigenous language, of which 4478 spoke Nahuatl.

There are 20 localities in the municipality, of which only the municipal seat, also called Los Reyes, is classified as urban. It recorded a population of 963 inhabitants in the 2010 Census.

== Economy ==
The main economic activity in Los Reyes is farming and corn is the main crop grown.
