= Zongolica =

- Municipality and town
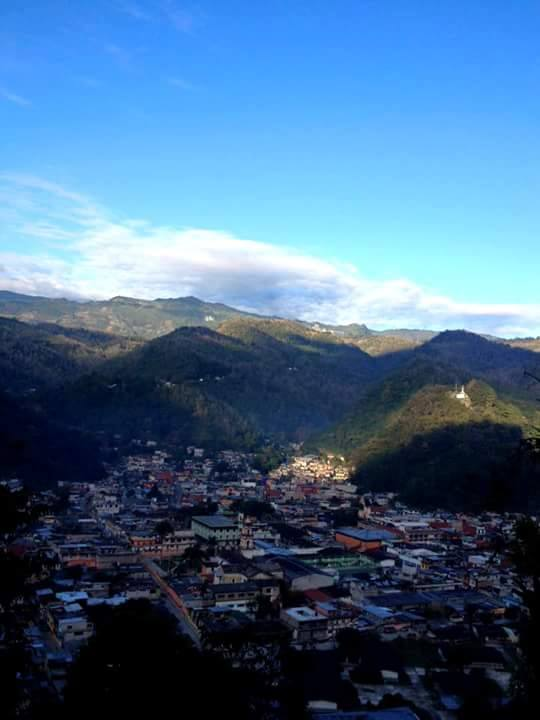
- Dawn over Zongolica

- Coat of arms

- Location in Mexico Zongolica (Mexico)
- Coordinates: 18°40′N 97°00′W
- Country: Mexico
- State: Veracruz

Government
  - Mayor: Eliseo R. Macuixtle

Area
  - Total: 347.33 km^{2} (134.10 sq mi)

Population (2020)
  - Total: 45,028
- Time zone: UTC-6 (Central)
- Website: zongolica.gob.mx

Zongolica is a city and its surrounding municipality in the Mexican state of Veracruz. It is located in the state's central Mountains region, about 100 km from the state capital at Xalapa. The municipality covers 63.34 km^{2} and, in 2020, reported a population of 45,028. It is located at 18°40′N 97°00′W. The name comes from Nahuatl Tzontli-coliuhqui 'crafty hair'.

== Economy ==
It produces principally maize, orange fruit coffee and mango. The climate is cold-humid, with an average temperature of 17.4 °C, with rains in summer and autumn.

== Culture ==
Every October, a festival is held to celebrate Saint Francis of Assisi, the town's patron, and in December there is a festival in honor of the Virgin of Guadalupe.

Zongolica is home to the Ixcohuapa people, who are known for cooking and consuming larvae of Arsenura armida.

XEZON-AM, an indigenous community radio station that broadcasts in Spanish and Nahuatl, is based in Zongolica.

== Geography ==
The municipality of Zongolica is bordered to the north by Tequila and Omealca, to the east by Tezonapa, to the south by the state of Puebla and to the west by Los Reyes.

=== Climate ===
Climate data for Zongolica
| Month | Jan | Feb | Mar | Apr | May | Jun | Jul | Aug | Sep | Oct | Nov | Dec | Year |
|---|---|---|---|---|---|---|---|---|---|---|---|---|---|
| Mean daily maximum °C (°F) | 20.3 (68.5) | 21 (70) | 23.6 (74.5) | 25.7 (78.3) | 26.4 (79.5) | 25.8 (78.4) | 24.9 (76.8) | 25.6 (78.1) | 25.1 (77.2) | 23.5 (74.3) | 22.3 (72.1) | 20.6 (69.1) | 23.7 (74.7) |
| Mean daily minimum °C (°F) | 7.9 (46.2) | 7.7 (45.9) | 9.5 (49.1) | 11.5 (52.7) | 13.3 (55.9) | 14.3 (57.7) | 13.1 (55.6) | 13.5 (56.3) | 14.0 (57.2) | 12.7 (54.9) | 10.2 (50.4) | 8.7 (47.7) | 11.4 (52.5) |
| Average precipitation mm (inches) | 86 (3.4) | 64 (2.5) | 61 (2.4) | 94 (3.7) | 150 (6) | 440 (17.2) | 530 (20.8) | 440 (17.4) | 430 (16.8) | 250 (9.9) | 130 (5.3) | 94 (3.7) | 2,770 (109.1) |
Source: Weatherbase

=== Fauna ===
Zongolica catfish Rhamdia zongolicensis is named after Zongolica and only known from a single cave in the Sierra de Zongolica.
