= Ixtaczoquitlán =

City in Veracruz, Mexico

- City and municipality
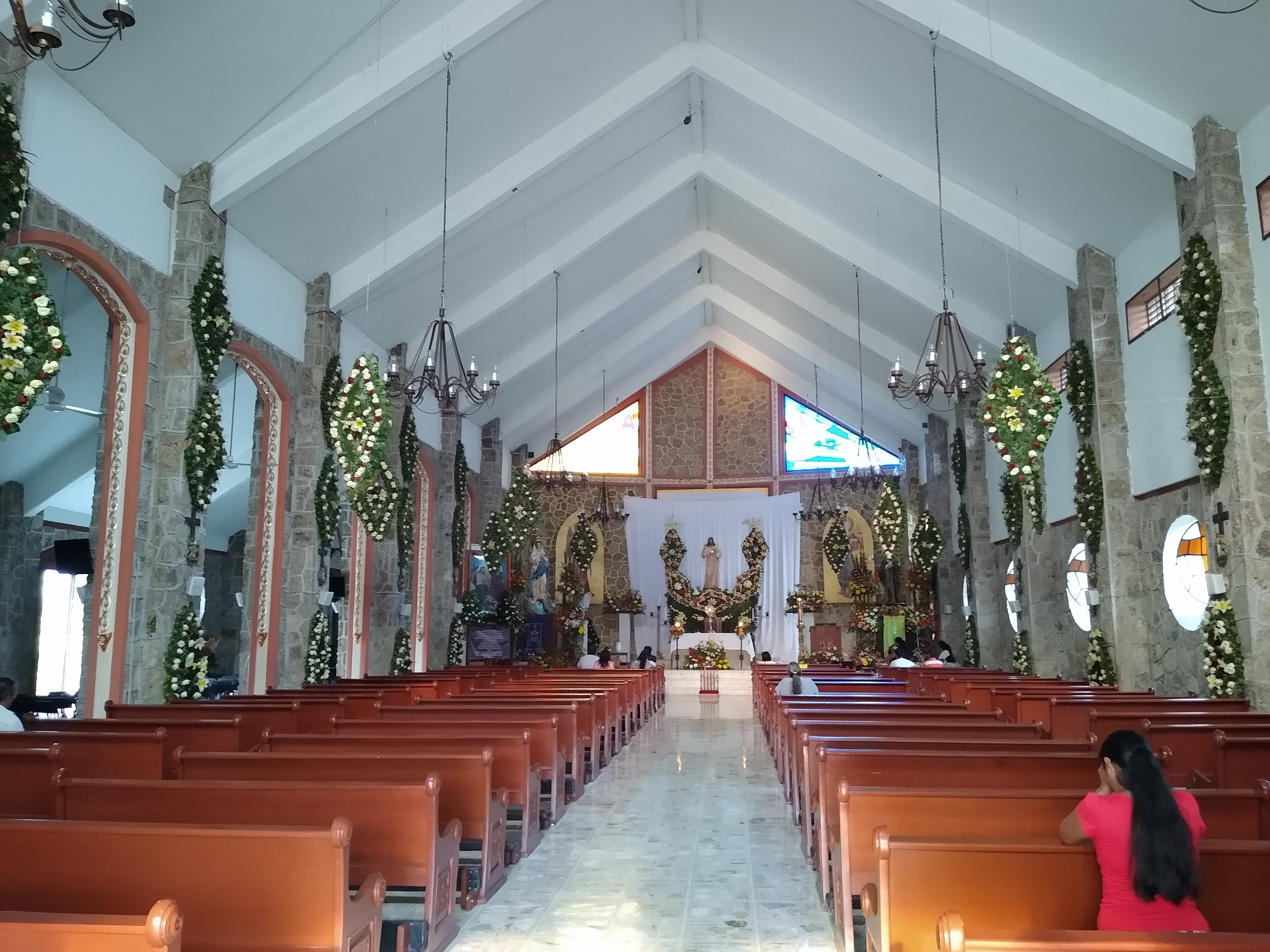
- Parroquia de la Inmaculada Concepción

- Coat of arms

- Location in Veracruz
- Coordinates: 18°51′10″N 97°03′46″W
- Country: Mexico
- State: Veracruz
- Region: Mountains Region

Government
  - Federal electoral district: Veracruz's 16th
- Elevation: 1,009 m (3,310 ft)

Population (2020)
  - Total: 74,004
  - Seat: 26,187
- Time zone: UTC-6 (Zona Centro)

Ixtaczoquitlán is a city in the Mexican state of Veracruz, near the city of Orizaba.

== Geography ==
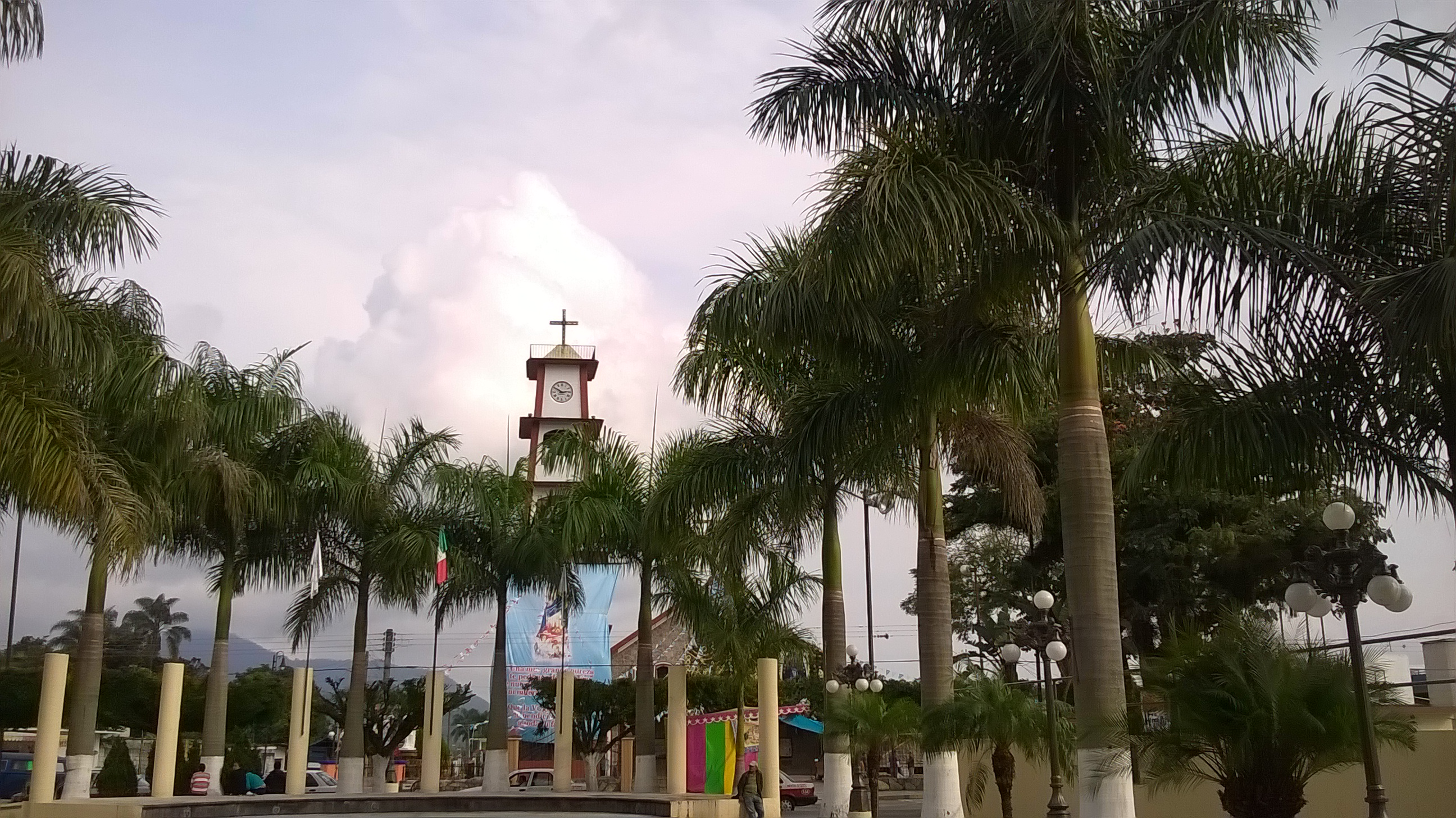
Parque de Ixtaczoquitlán

It is located 2 kilometers (1.2 mi) from Orizaba. It is close to the Fortín–Orizaba railroad and stands on Federal Highways 180 & 190. It serves as the municipal seat for the surrounding municipality of the same name. It is in the Orizaba-Córdoba region and is contiguous with these two as well as with the municipality of Fortín.

=== Climate ===
Ixtaczoquitlán has a temperate climate with temperatures between 10 °C and 32 °C (50F and 90F). The rainy season is June through September typically raining in the evenings and at night, with clear beautiful mornings and afternoons. The hottest months are April–July with warm to hot days but yet cool temps at night. The coolest months are Dec and Jan with frequent, beautiful fog at night which creates a dripping sound known here as "chipi-chipi" The vast majority of homes do not have heat or cooling as the climate is mild. It never freezes in Ixtac.

=== Fauna ===
The following fauna has been spotted in Ixtac: scarlet kingsnake, Black Racer, small lizards like the knob, Tarantulas, Geckos, Coatimundi, and Raccoons. Here is a short list of birds sighted here by KT:

- Mirlo cafe (Turdus grayi)
- Green Jay (Cyanocorax luxuosus)
- Grey-necked Wood Rail (Aramides cajaneus)
- Saltator spp.
- Chachalacas (Ortalis spp.)
- Collared Aracari Toucan (Pteroglossus torquatus)
- Ferruginous Pygmy Owl (Glaucidium brasilianum)
- White-fronted Parrot (Amazona albifrons)
- Baltimore Oriole (Icterus galbula)
- Great-tailed Grackle (Quiscalus mexicanus)
- Montezuma Oropendola (Psarocolius montezuma)
- Brown Jay, aka "Pepe" - (Psilorhinus morio)
- Black Vulture (Coragyps atratus)
- Red-billed Pigeon (Patagioenas flavirostris)

=== Flora ===
Its vegetation is regular or high, has various species of Avocados including the Chinene, Various Bananas and Platanos, Inga (Ice cream bean), Chayote Squash, Various Squashes, Peaches, Cherry Tomatoes, orange, Limes, Chocolate Sapote, Mamey Sapote, Caca de nino Sapote, Poor man's pepper, maize/corn, papaya, coffee, moor etc.

== History ==
The Battle of Escamela was fought in Ixtaczoquitlán during the War of Mexican Independence in 1812. Mexican rebels under José María Morelos fought against Spanish loyalist forces as part of a broader plan to take control of Orizaba and cut off communications between Mexico City and the major port of Veracruz.

== Things to see and do ==
Venustiano Carranza Park: This is the main park in Ixtac centro. It was modernized in 2015–2016 with a lighted-fountain, image-reflection mirror, sound system, playground, performing arts stage, benches, landscaping (including jacarandas, Macadamia Trees, orchid trees, magnolias, sweet gums, sycamores, palms, flowering plants and grasses), food vending businesses (grab a beer or coffee and something to eat at one of the vendors).

There is a trail that is now being modernized with stone steps and support walls which leads down the canyon to the river and to a natural spring called Los Sifones. There is swimming in the spring all year. It is warmer than nearby Ojo de agua. Update: this trail with approx. 560 stairs is now complete. Also finished is the new Glass overlook (Mirador) with access located at the south end of calle 9 Sur.

Once down the mountain to the river, you can also go up the road to a small town called Zoquitlan viejo and walk around.

A local specialty is Taco de Flor Or mamela de frijol.

== Legend ==
Legend has it that in the center of Ixtaczoquitlan have been nahuales wizards, who in the epoch of the Spaniards, could turn themselves into animals and shades, leaving everyone afraid. Nobody wanted to be outside during nights because of the nahuales, and the people hid the children for fear that the Nahuales could eat them.

== See also ==
- Moyoapan, a town in the municipality
