= Omealca =

Municipality in Mexico

Coordinates: 18°45′N 96°46′W

- Municipality
- Location within Veracruz Location within Mexico
- Country: Mexico
- State: Veracruz

Government
  - Federal electoral district: Veracruz's 18th

Population (2020)
  - Municipality: 23,773
- Time zone: UTC−6 (Central)
- Website: omealca.gob.mx

Omealca is a town and its surrounding municipality in the Mexican state of Veracruz.

In the 2020 INEGI census, the municipality reported a total population of 23,773.

== Etymology ==
Omealca means place with two rivers in Nahuatl, due to it being next to Blanco river and above a subterranean one.

== Geography ==
=== Climate ===
Omealca has a very diverse range of climates, as it is next to the state of Puebla and Oaxaca, meaning that besides having Veracruz's tropical climate, it also has Puebla's mountainous climate and Oaxaca's arid climate.
