= 13th federal electoral district of Veracruz =

Federal electoral district of Mexico

Veracruz's 13th
- Electoral district of the Chamber of Deputies of Mexico

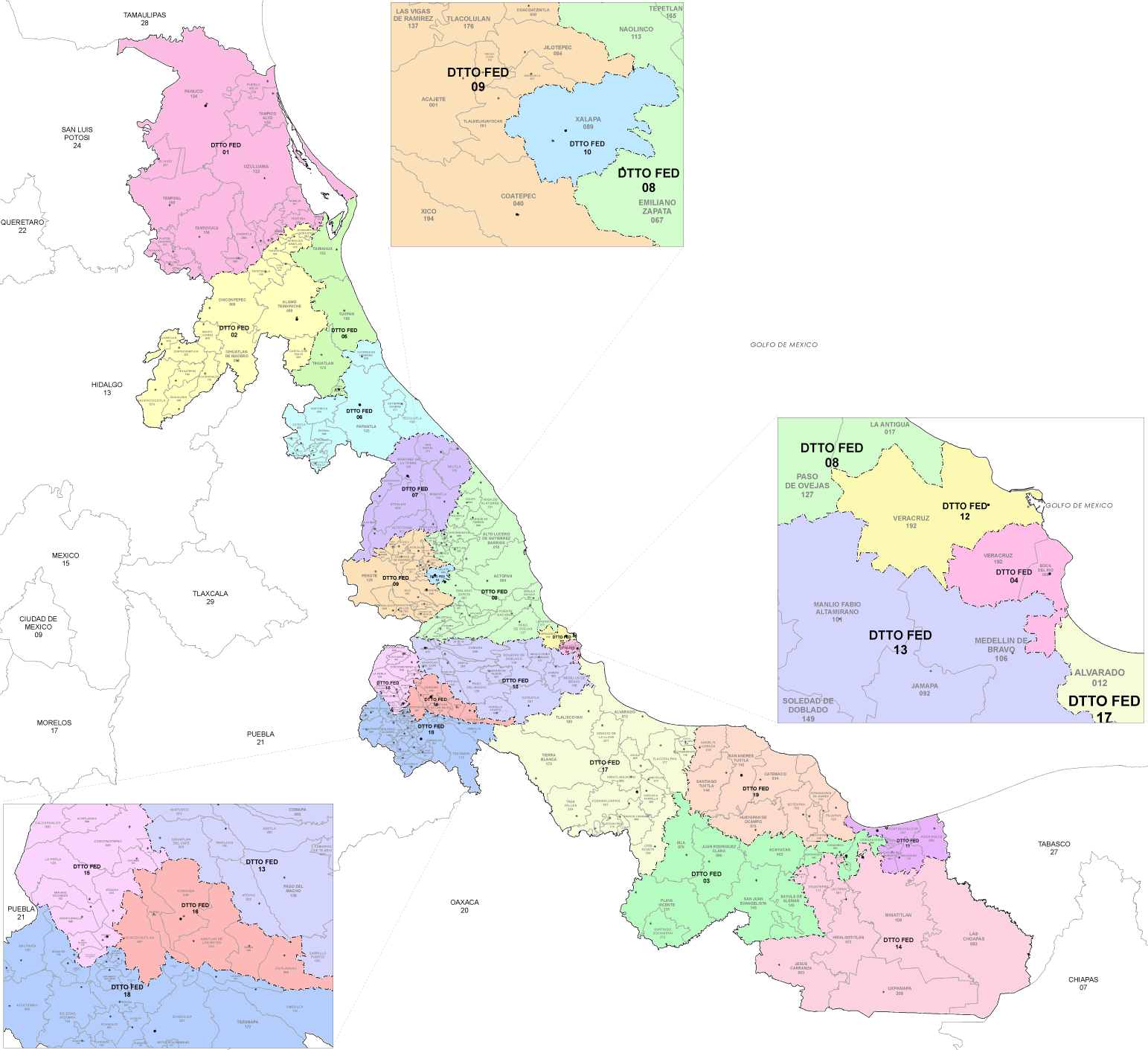
- 13th district since 2023

Incumbent
- Member: Blanca Estela Hernández
- Party: ▌Ecologist Green Party
- Congress: 66th (2024–2027)

District
- State: Veracruz
- Head town: Huatusco
- Coordinates: 19°09′N 96°58′W
- Covers: 16 municipalities: Camarón de Tejeda, Atoyac, Carrillo Puerto, Comapa, Cotaxtla, Huatusco, Ixhuatlán del Café, Jamapa, Manlio Fabio Altamirano, Medellín de Bravo, Paso del Macho, Sochiapa, Soledad de Doblado, Tepatlaxco, Tlacotepec de Mejía, Zentla
- PR region: Third
- Precincts: 197
- Population: 392,118 (2020 census)

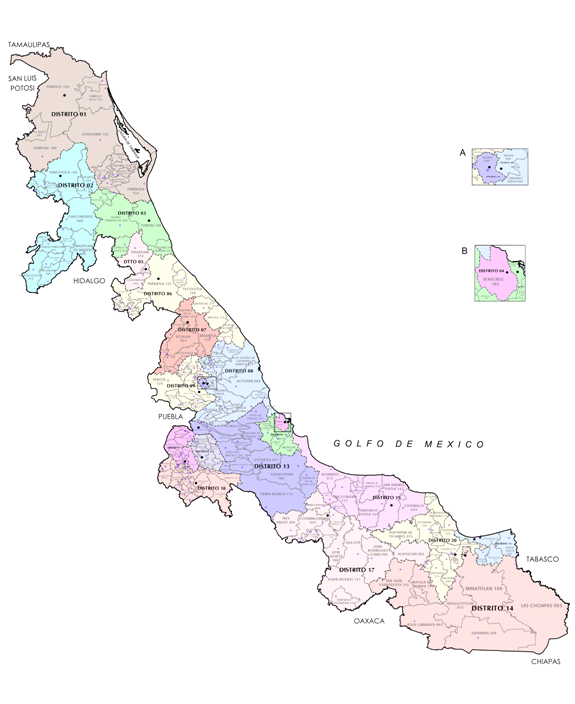
Veracruz under the 2017–2022 districting plan

The 13th federal electoral district of Veracruz (Spanish: Distrito electoral federal 13 de Veracruz) is one of the 300 electoral districts into which Mexico is divided for elections to the federal Chamber of Deputies and one of 19 such districts in the state of Veracruz.

It elects one deputy to the lower house of Congress for each three-year legislative session by means of the first-past-the-post system. Votes cast in the district also count towards the calculation of proportional representation ("plurinominal") deputies elected from the third region.

The current member for the district, elected in the 2024 general election, is Blanca Estela Hernández Rodríguez of the Ecologist Green Party of Mexico (PVEM).

== District territory ==
Veracruz lost a congressional district in the 2023 districting plan adopted by the National Electoral Institute (INE), which is to be used for the 2024, 2027 and 2030 elections. The reconfigured 13th district covers 197 electoral precincts (secciones electorales) across 16 municipalities in the state's Sotavento and Mountains regions:

- Camarón de Tejeda, Atoyac, Carrillo Puerto, Comapa, Cotaxtla, Huatusco, Ixhuatlán del Café, Jamapa, Manlio Fabio Altamirano, Medellín de Bravo, Paso del Macho, Sochiapa, Soledad de Doblado, Tepatlaxco, Tlacotepec de Mejía and Zentla.

The head town (cabecera distrital), where results from individual polling stations are gathered together and tallied, is the city of Huatusco. The district reported a population of 392,118 in the 2020 census.

== Previous districting schemes ==
Evolution of electoral district numbers
	1974	1978	1996	2005	2017	2023
Veracruz	15	23	23	21	20	19
Chamber of Deputies	196	300				

Because of shifting demographics, Veracruz currently has four fewer districts than the 23 the state was allocated under the 1977 electoral reforms.

2017–2022

Between 2017 and 2022, Veracruz was assigned 20 electoral districts. The 13th district covered 14 municipalities in the same region between the mountains and the sea as at present:
- Camarón de Tejeda, Carrillo Puerto, Comapa, Cotaxtla, Cuitláhuac, Huatusco, Ignacio de la Llave, Paso del Macho, Paso de Ovejas, Sochiapa, Soledad de Doblado, Tierra Blanca, Tlalixcoyan and Zentla.
Its head town was the city of Huatusco.

2005–2017

Veracruz's allocation of congressional seats fell to 21 in the 2005 redistricting process. Between 2005 and 2017 the 13th district had its head town at Huatusco and it comprised 19 municipalities:
- Camarón de Tejeda, La Antigua, Atoyac, Tlaltetela, Carrillo Puerto, Comapa, Huatusco, Ixhuatlán del Café, Manlio Fabio Altamirano, Paso del Macho, Paso de Ovejas, Puente Nacional, Sochiapa, Soledad de Doblado, Tenampa, Tepatlaxco, Tlacotepec de Mejía, Totutla and Zentla.

1996–2005

Under the 1996 districting plan, which allocated Veracruz 23 districts, the head town was at Huatusco and the district covered 18 municipalities.

1978–1996

The districting scheme in force from 1978 to 1996 was the result of the 1977 electoral reforms, which increased the number of single-member seats in the Chamber of Deputies from 196 to 300. Under that plan, Veracruz's seat allocation rose from 15 to 23. The 13th district had its head town at Acayucan and it covered the municipalities of Acayucan, Catemaco, Hueyapan, Isla, Juan Rodríguez Clara, Mecayapan, Playa Vicente and Soteapan.

== Deputies returned to Congress ==
(Mexico) National parties
- Current
- PAN
- PRI
- PT
- PVEM
- MC
- Morena
- PAZ
- Somos
- Defunct or local only
- PLM
- PNR
- PRM
- PNM
- PP
- PPS
- PARM
- PFCRN
- CON
- PANAL
- PSD
- PES
- PES
- PRD

Veracruz's 13th district
Election	Deputy	Party	Term	Legislature
1916	Heriberto Jara		1916–1917	Constituent Congress of Querétaro
...
1973	Serafín Domínguez Ferman	Institutional Revolutionary Party	1973–1976	49th Congress
1976	Francisco Cinta Guzmán	Institutional Revolutionary Party	1976–1979	50th Congress
1979	Marco Antonio Muñoz	Institutional Revolutionary Party	1979–1982	51st Congress
1982	Celso Vázquez Ramírez	Institutional Revolutionary Party	1982–1985	52nd Congress
1985	Hesiquio Aguilar de la Parra	Institutional Revolutionary Party	1985–1988	53rd Congress
1988	Humberto Peña Reyes	Institutional Revolutionary Party	1988–1991	54th Congress
1991	Jorge Uscanga Escobar	Institutional Revolutionary Party	1991–1994	55th Congress
1994	Pedro Guillermo Rivera Pavón	Institutional Revolutionary Party	1994–1997	56th Congress
1997	Rafael Spinoso Foglia	Institutional Revolutionary Party	1997–2000	57th Congress
2000	Jorge Schettino Pérez	Institutional Revolutionary Party	2000–2003	58th Congress
2003	Alberto Urcino Méndez Gálvez	National Action Party (Mexico)	2003–2006	59th Congress
2006	Agustín Mollinedo Hernández	National Action Party (Mexico)	2006–2009	60th Congress
2009	Felipe Amadeo Flores Espinosa (Note: Flores Espinosa resigned his seat to take office as the attorney-general of Veracruz in the administration of Javier Duarte.); Frida Celeste Rosas Peralta	Institutional Revolutionary Party	2009–2011; 2011–2012	61st Congress
2012	Víctor Serralde Martínez	National Action Party (Mexico)	2012–2015	62nd Congress
2015	Miguel Ángel Sedas Castro	Ecologist Green Party of Mexico	2015–2018	63rd Congress
2018	Eleuterio Arrieta Sánchez	National Regeneration Movement	2018–2021	64th Congress
2021	Angélica Peña Martínez	Ecologist Green Party of Mexico	2021–2024	65th Congress
2024	Blanca Estela Hernández Rodríguez	Ecologist Green Party of Mexico	2024–2027	66th Congress

== Presidential elections ==
Veracruz's 13th district
Election	District won by	Party or coalition	%
2018	Andrés Manuel López Obrador	Juntos Haremos Historia	49.8598
2024	Claudia Sheinbaum Pardo	Sigamos Haciendo Historia	62.6972
