= El Palmar =

El Palmar may refer to:

== Mexico ==
- El Palmar, a community in San Juan Bautista Tuxtepec, Oaxaca
- El Palmar, a community in Carrillo Puerto, Veracruz
- El Palmar (Maya site), in southeastern Campeche; see Apoch'Waal

== Spain ==
- El Palmar, Murcia
- El Palmar, a village on Macizo de Teno, Tenerife
- El Palmar, Valencia
- El Palmar de Troya, Seville province

== Elsewhere ==
- El Palmar National Park, Argentina
- El Palmar, Dominican Republic
- El Palmar, Quetzaltenango, Guatemala
- El Palmar, Coclé, Panama
- El Palmar, Bolívar, Venezuela
