= Atoyac, Veracruz =

Municipality in the Mexican state of Veracruz

Atoyac
- Municipality
- Location in Mexico Atoyac (Mexico)
- Country: Mexico
- State: Veracruz
- Demonym: (in Spanish)
- Time zone: UTC−6 (CST)

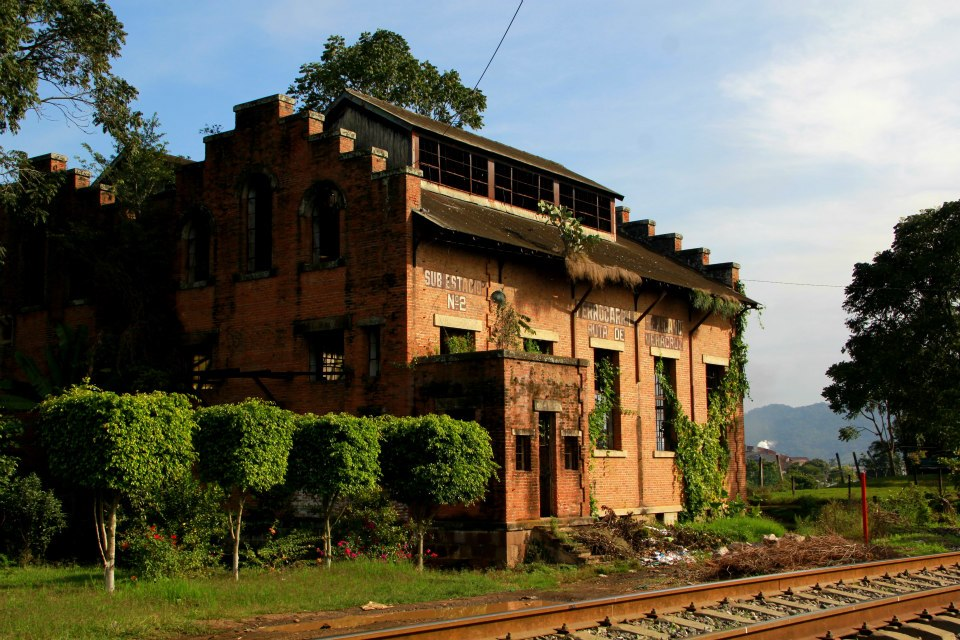
Railway substation in Potrero Nuevo, municipality of Atoyac, Veracruz.

Atoyac is a municipality in the Mexican state of Veracruz. It is located about 196 km from state capital Xalapa. It has a surface of 171.09 km^{2}. It is located at 18°55′N 96°46′W.

The municipality of is delimited to the north by Tepatlaxco, to the east by Paso del Macho, to the south-east by Cuitláhuac, to the south by Yanga, to the west by Amatlán de los Reyes.

It produces principally maize and beans.
