= Felipe Flores =

Felipe Flores may refer to:

- Felipe Amadeo Flores Espinosa (born 1947), Mexican politician
- Felipe Flores (footballer, born 1977), Chilean footballer
- Felipe Flores (footballer, born 1987), Chilean footballer
