= Apocalypto =

2006 film by Mel Gibson

- Theatrical release poster
- Directed by: Mel Gibson
- Written by: Farhad Safinia; Mel Gibson
- Produced by: Mel Gibson; Bruce Davey
- Starring: Rudy Youngblood; Raoul Trujillo; Mayra Sérbulo; Dalia Hernández; Jonathan Brewer; Gerardo Taracena; Rodolfo Palacios; Bernardo Ruiz Juarez; Ammel Rodrigo Mendoza; Ricardo Diaz Mendoza; Israel Contreras
- Cinematography: Dean Semler
- Edited by: John Wright
- Music by: James Horner
- Production companies: Touchstone Pictures; Icon Productions
- Distributed by: Buena Vista Pictures Distribution (North America); Icon Film Distribution (International)
- Release date: December 8, 2006
- Running time: 138 minutes
- Countries: United States; Mexico
- Language: Yucatec Maya
- Budget: $40 million
- Box office: $120.7 million

Apocalypto (/əˌpɒkəˈlɪptoʊ/) is a 2006 epic historical action-adventure film produced and directed by Mel Gibson, who co-wrote the screenplay with Farhad Safinia. The film features a cast of Indigenous and Mexican actors consisting of Rudy Youngblood, Raoul Trujillo, Mayra Sérbulo, Dalia Hernández, Gerardo Taracena, Jonathan Brewer, Rodolfo Palacios, Bernardo Ruiz Juarez, Ammel Rodrigo Mendoza, Ricardo Diaz Mendoza, and Israel Contreras. Set in either Yucatán or Guatemala during the year 1502, Apocalypto portrays the hero's journey of a young man named Jaguar Paw, a late Mesoamerican hunter and his fellow tribesmen who are captured by an invading force. After a raid on their village, they are brought on a perilous journey to a Maya city for human sacrifice at a time when the Maya civilization is in decline.

Principal photography took place in Mexico from November 21, 2005 to July 2006. All dialogue is in a modern approximation of the ancient language of the setting, and the Indigenous Yucatec Mayan language is spoken with subtitles, which sometimes refer to the language as Mayan.

Apocalypto was distributed by Buena Vista Pictures Distribution in North America and Icon Film Distribution in the United Kingdom and Australia. The film was released on December 8, 2006 and was a box office success, grossing over $120 million worldwide, and received generally positive reviews, with critics praising Gibson's direction, Dean Semler's cinematography, and the performances of the cast, though the portrayal of Maya civilization and perceived historical inaccuracies were criticized.

== Plot ==
While hunting in the Mesoamerican rainforest, Jaguar Paw, his father Flint Sky, and their fellow tribesmen encounter a group of refugees fleeing from war and devastation. Returning to their village, Flint Sky notes that the refugees are sick with fear and urges Jaguar Paw to never allow the fear to infect him. Later that night, the tribe gathers around an elder who tells a prophetic story about a being who is consumed by an emptiness that cannot be satisfied, despite having all the gifts of the world offered to him. The being will continue blindly taking until there is nothing left to take and the world is no more.

The next morning, the village is attacked by Maya raiders led by Zero Wolf. Many tribespeople are killed, including Flint Sky who dies at the hands of the sadistic Middle Eye. Before being captured, Jaguar Paw manages to hide his pregnant wife Seven and their young son Turtles Run in an empty well. One of the raiders notices the rope leading down to the well and cuts it. Jaguar Paw attempts to kill Middle Eye out of rage for his father's death, but is halted. Middle Eye gives Jaguar Paw the nickname "Almost". In the aftermath, the raiders force the surviving adults on a long march through the jungle, leaving the children to fend for themselves. Seven and Turtles Run remain trapped in the well.

Along the way, the raiders and their captives encounter razed forests and vast fields of failed maize crops, alongside villages decimated by an unknown disease. They then encounter an infected little girl who prophesies the end of the Maya world.

Arriving in the city, the captives are divided; the women are sold into slavery while the men are escorted to the top of a pyramid where they are brutally sacrificed to appease the gods. As Jaguar Paw is laid out on the altar, a solar eclipse occurs. Taking the event as an omen that the gods are satisfied, the Mayans spare the remaining captives. However, the raiders use them for target practice, offering them freedom if they can dodge the spears thrown at them. The first pair of runners, including Jaguar Paw's friend Blunted, are easily struck down. Jaguar Paw follows thereafter, and is also wounded. Zero Wolf's son Cut Rock approaches them to deliver the killing blow. The mortally wounded Blunted distracts Cut Rock, allowing Jaguar Paw to kill him and escape.

An enraged Zero Wolf leads Middle Eye and seven other men to hunt down Jaguar Paw. Reaching the jungle, Jaguar Paw remembers his father's words not to give in to fear, and challenges Zero Wolf to hunt him. Jaguar Paw uses his knowledge of the jungle to lure his pursuers to their deaths (one is killed by a black jaguar; a second is killed by a rattlesnake; a third is killed by Zero Wolf for disobeying an order; a fourth smashes his head on a rock after jumping down a waterfall; a fifth is poisoned by Jaguar Paw). Among those he kills himself are Middle Eye, whom he bludgeons with a stone hatchet, and Zero Wolf, whom he lures into a spike trap made for tapir hunts. The last two raiders continue to pursue Jaguar Paw on the outskirts of his village.

Reaching the shores amidst a heavy downpour, all three are stunned to witness the arrival of Spanish conquistadors. While the two raiders approach the foreigners, Jaguar Paw races back to his village. He manages to rescue his family from the well and is overjoyed to see Seven has safely given birth during the ordeal. After watching the ships, Jaguar Paw's family depart to start a new life in the forest, away from both the Mayans and the Spanish.

== Cast ==
The Village
- Rudy Youngblood as Jaguar Paw / Almost, a tribesman hunter who is the son of Flint Sky, the husband of Seven, and the father of Turtles Run
- Dalia Hernández as Seven, Jaguar Paw's heavily pregnant wife, who is also Turtles Run's mother and Flint Sky's daughter-in-law
- Jonathan Brewer as Blunted, a fellow tribesman who suffers from fertility issues
- Morris Birdyellowhead as Flint Sky, the leader of the village tribesmen, who is also Jaguar Paw's father, Turtles Run's grandfather, and Seven's father-in-law
- Carlos Emilio Báez as Turtles Run, Jaguar Paw and Seven's son, and Flint Sky's grandson
- Amílcar Ramírez as Curl Nose, a fellow tribesman who is one of the first village hunters to be sacrificed at the temple
- Israel Contreras as Smoke Frog, a fellow tribesman
- Israel Ríos as Cocoa Leaf, a fellow tribesman
- María Isabel Díaz as Mother in Law, Sky Flower's mother and Blunted's mother-in-law who verbally attacks him for being infertile
- Espiridion Acosta Cache as Old Story Teller, the village's campfire story teller
- Mayra Serbulo as Young Woman
- Iazua Larios as Sky Flower, Blunted's wife and Mother in Law's daughter
- Lorena Hernandez as Village Girl
- Itandehui Gutierrez as Wife
- Sayuri Gutierrez as Eldest Daughter
- Hiram Soto as Fish Hunter
- Jose Suarez as Eldest Temple Sacrifice

The Holcane Warriors

- Raoul Trujillo as Zero Wolf, leader of the Holcane warriors and Cut Rock's father
- Gerardo Taracena as Middle Eye, a sadistic and psychopathic fellow Holcane warrior
- Rodolfo Palacios as Snake Ink
- Ariel Galván as Hanging Moss
- Bernardo Ruiz Juárez as Drunkards Four
- Ricardo Díaz Mendoza as Cut Rock, the son of Zero Wolf
- Richard Can as Ten Peccary
- Carlos Ramos as Monkey Jaw
- Ammel Rodrigo Mendoza as Buzzard Hook
- Marco Antonio Argueta as Speaking Winds
- Javier Escobar as Vicious Holcane

The City

- Fernando Hernández as High Priest, the temple's priest who executes the human sacrifices
- María Isidra Hoil as Oracle Girl, a young girl infected with an unknown disease who prophesies the end of the Maya world
  - Aquetzali García as stunt double of Oracle Girl
- Abel Woolrich as Laughing Man
- Antonio Monroy as Chilam
- Nicolas Jasso as Man on Temple top
- Ronaldo Eknal as Slave Auctioneer
- Miriam Tun as Woman Auctioneer
- Rafael Vélez as King
- Diana Botello as Queen
- JoaQuin Rendon as Head Chac

== Production ==
=== Screenplay ===
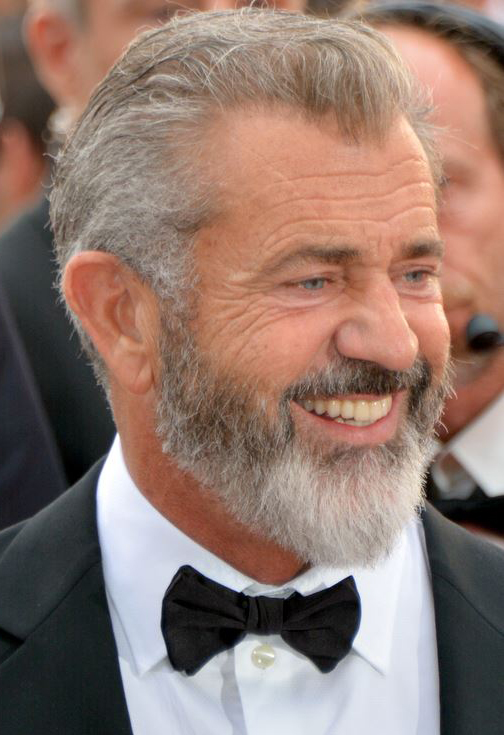
Mel Gibson directed Apocalypto after he made The Passion of the Christ.

Screenwriter and co-producer Farhad Safinia first met Mel Gibson while working as an assistant during the post-production of The Passion of the Christ. Eventually, Gibson and Safinia found time to discuss "their mutual love of movies and what excites them about moviemaking".

We started to talk about what to do next, but we specifically spent a lot of time on the action-chase genre of filmmaking. Those conversations essentially grew into the skeleton of (Apocalypto). We wanted to update the chase genre by, in fact, not updating it with technology or machinery but stripping it down to its most intense form, which is a man running for his life, and at the same time getting back to something that matters to him.
—Farhad Safinia

Gibson said they wanted to "shake up the stale action-adventure genre", which he felt was dominated by CGI, stock stories and shallow characters and to create a foot chase that would "feel like a car chase that just keeps turning the screws."

Gibson and Safinia were also interested in portraying and exploring an ancient culture as it existed before the arrival of the Europeans. Considering both the Aztecs and the Maya, they eventually chose the Maya for their high sophistication and their eventual decline.

The Mayas were far more interesting to us. You can choose a civilization that is bloodthirsty, or you can show the Maya civilization that was so sophisticated with an immense knowledge of medicine, science, archaeology and engineering ... but also be able to illuminate the brutal undercurrent and ritual savagery that they practiced. It was a far more interesting world to explore why and what happened to them.
—Farhad Safinia

The two researched ancient Maya history, reading both creation and destruction myths, including sacred texts such as the Popul Vuh. In the audio commentary of the film's first DVD release, Safinia states that the old shaman's story (played by Espiridion Acosta Cache, a modern-day Maya storyteller) was modified from an authentic Mesoamerican tale that was re-translated by Hilario Chi Canul, a professor of Maya, into the Yucatec Maya language for the film. He also served as a dialogue coach during production. As they researched the script, Safinia and Gibson traveled to Guatemala, Costa Rica and the Yucatán Peninsula to scout filming locations and visit Maya ruins.

Striving for a degree of historical accuracy, the filmmakers employed a consultant, Richard D. Hansen, a specialist in the Maya and assistant professor of archaeology at Idaho State University. As director of the Mirador Basin Project, he works to preserve a large swath of the Guatemalan rain forest and its Maya ruins. Gibson has said of Hansen's involvement: "Richard's enthusiasm for what he does is infectious. He was able to reassure us and make us feel secure that what we were writing had some authenticity as well as imagination."

Gibson decided that all the dialogue would be in the Yucatec Maya language. Gibson explained:

I think hearing a different language allows the audience to completely suspend their own reality and get drawn into the world of the film. And more importantly, this also puts the emphasis on the cinematic visuals, which are a kind of universal language of the heart.

=== Costumes and makeup ===
The production team consisted of a large group of make-up artists and costume designers who worked to recreate the Maya look for the large cast. Led by Aldo Signoretti, the make-up artists daily applied the required tattoos, scarification, and earlobe extensions to all of the on-screen actors. According to advisor Richard D. Hansen, the choices in body make-up were based on both artistic license and fact:

I spent hours and hours going through the pottery and the images looking for tattoos. The scarification and tattooing was all researched, the inlaid jade teeth are in there, the ear spools are in there. There is a little doohickey that comes down from the ear through the nose into the septum – that was entirely their artistic innovation.

Simon Atherton, an English armorer and weapon-maker who worked with Gibson on Braveheart, was hired to research and provide reconstructions of Maya weapons. Atherton also has a cameo as the cross-bearing Franciscan friar who appears on a Spanish ship at the end of the film.

=== Set design ===
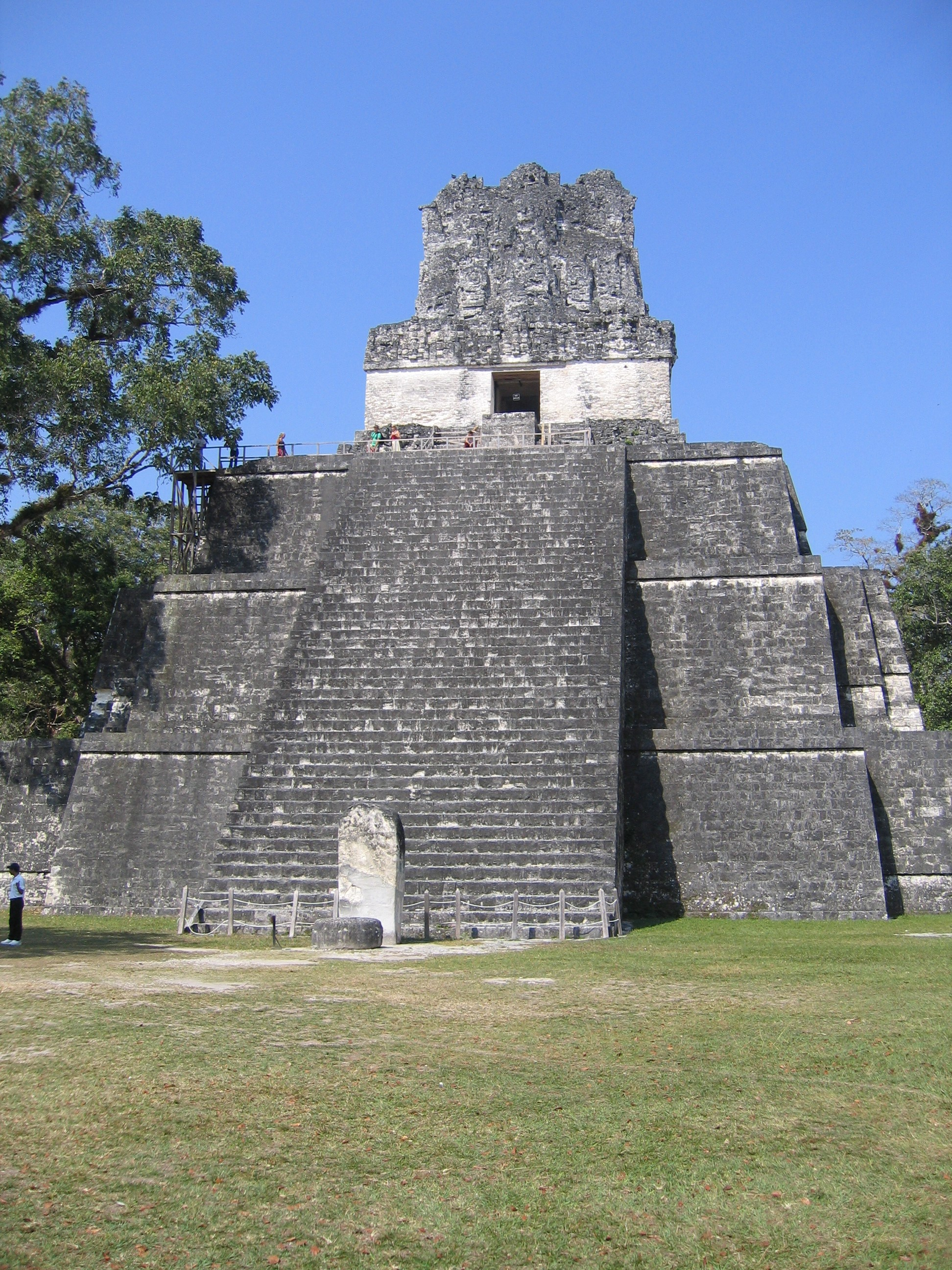
Pyramids like this at Tikal were reproduced for the film

Mel Gibson wanted Apocalypto to feature sets with buildings rather than relying on computer-generated images. Most of the step pyramids seen at the Maya city were models designed by Thomas E. Sanders. Sanders explained his approach:

We wanted to set up the Mayan world, but we were not trying to do a documentary. Visually, we wanted to go for what would have the most impact. Just as on Braveheart, you are treading the line of history and cinematography. Our job is to do a beautiful movie.

However, while many of the architectural details of the Mayan cities are correct, they are blended from different locations and eras, a decision Farhad Safinia said was made for aesthetic reasons. While Apocalypto is set during the terminal Postclassic period of Mayan civilization, the film's central pyramid is a structure built in the classic period, six hundred years earlier. It is a later Mayan city built around a pyramid that had been erected centuries before, examples of which are found in places such as the Postclassic sites of Muyil, Coba, and others in Quintana Roo, Mexico. The temples are in the shape of those of Tikal in the central lowlands classic style but decorated with the Puuc style elements of the northwest Yucatán centuries later. Richard D. Hansen comments, "There was nothing in the post-classic period that would match the size and majesty of that pyramid in the film. But Gibson ... was trying to depict opulence, wealth, consumption of resources." The mural in the arched walkway combined elements from the Maya codices, the Bonampak murals (over 700 years earlier than the film's setting), and the San Bartolo murals (some 1500 years earlier than the film's setting).

=== Filming ===
Gibson filmed Apocalypto mainly in Catemaco, San Andrés Tuxtla and Paso de Ovejas in the Mexican state of Veracruz. The waterfall scene was filmed at Eyipantla Falls, located in San Andrés Tuxtla. Other filming by second-unit crews took place in El Petén, Guatemala. The film was originally slated for an August 4, 2006, release, but Touchstone Pictures delayed the release date to December 8, 2006, due to heavy rains and two hurricanes interfering with filming in Mexico. Principal photography ended in July 2006.

Apocalypto was shot on high-definition digital video, using the Panavision Genesis camera. During filming, Gibson and cinematographer Dean Semler employed Spydercam, a suspended camera system allowing shooting from above. This equipment was used in a scene in which Jaguar Paw leaps off a waterfall.

We had a Spydercam shot from the top of [the] 150-foot [46 m] waterfall, looking over an actor's shoulder and then plunging over the edge—literally in the waterfall. I thought we'd be doing it on film, but we put the Genesis [camera] up there in a light-weight water housing. The temperatures were beyond 100 degrees [38 °C] at [the] top, and about 60 degrees [15 °C] at the bottom, with the water and the mist. We shot two fifty-minute tapes without any problems—though we [did get] water in there once and fogged up.

A number of animals are featured in Apocalypto, including a Baird's tapir and a black jaguar. Animatronics or puppets were employed for the scenes injurious to animals.

== Music ==
The music to Apocalypto was composed by James Horner in his third collaboration with director Mel Gibson. The non-traditional score features a large array of exotic instruments and vocals by Pakistani singer Rahat Fateh Ali Khan.

== Distribution and marketing ==
While Mel Gibson financed the film through his Icon Productions, Disney signed on to distribute Apocalypto for a fee in certain markets under the Touchstone Pictures label in North America, and Icon Film Distribution in the United Kingdom and Australia. The publicity for the film started with a December 2005 teaser trailer that was filmed before the start of principal photography and before Rudy Youngblood was cast as Jaguar Paw. As a joke, Gibson inserted a subliminal cameo of the bearded director in a plaid shirt with a cigarette hanging from his mouth posing next to a group of dust-covered Maya. A clean-shaven Gibson also filmed a Mayan-language segment for the introduction of the 2006 Academy Awards in which he declined to host the ceremony.

On September 23, 2006, Gibson pre-screened the unfinished film to two predominantly Native American audiences in the US state of Oklahoma, at the Riverwind Casino in Goldsby, owned by the Chickasaw Nation, and at Cameron University in Lawton. He also commenced a pre-screening in Austin, Texas, on September 24 in conjunction with one of the film's stars, Rudy Youngblood. In Los Angeles, Gibson screened Apocalypto and participated in a Q&A session for Latin Business Association and for members of the Maya community. Due to an enthusiastic response from exhibitors, Disney opened the film on more than 2,500 screens in the United States.

== Themes ==
According to Mel Gibson, the Maya setting of Apocalypto is "merely the backdrop" for a more universal story of exploring "civilizations and what undermines them". The filmmakers intended for the collapse of Maya to mirror issues seen in contemporary society. The problems "faced by the Maya are extraordinarily similar to those faced today by our own civilization," co-writer Safinia stated during production, "especially when it comes to widespread environmental degradation, excessive consumption and political corruption". Gibson has stated that the film is an attempt at illustrating the parallels between a great fallen empire of the past and the great empires of today.

The film serves as a cultural critique – in Hansen's words, a "social statement" – sending the message that it is never a mistake to question our own assumptions about morality. Gibson has defined the title, based on Greek word (ἀποκαλύπτω, apokaluptō), as "a new beginning or an unveiling – a revelation...Everything has a beginning and an end, and all civilizations have operated like that".

== Reception ==
=== Critical response ===
On review aggregator website Rotten Tomatoes, the film holds an approval rating of 65% based on 199 reviews, with an average rating of 6.60/10. The site's critical consensus reads: "Apocalypto is a brilliantly filmed, if mercilessly bloody, examination of a once great civilization." On Metacritic, the film has a weighted average score of 68 out of 100, based on 37 critics, indicating "generally favorable" reviews. Audiences polled by CinemaScore gave the film an average grade of "B+" on an A+ to F scale.

Richard Roeper and guest critic Aisha Tyler on the television show Ebert & Roeper gave it "two thumbs up" rating. Michael Medved gave Apocalypto four out of four stars calling the film "an adrenaline-drenched chase movie" and "a visceral visual experience."

The film was released less than six months after Gibson's 2006 DUI incident, which garnered Gibson much negative publicity and magnified concerns some had over alleged antisemitism in his previous film, The Passion of the Christ. Several key film critics alluded to the incident in their reviews of Apocalypto. In his positive review for The New York Times, A. O. Scott commented: "say what you will about him – about his problem with booze or his problem with Jews – he is a serious filmmaker." The Boston Globe's review came to a similar conclusion, noting: "Gibson may be a lunatic, but he's our lunatic, and while I wouldn't wish him behind the wheel of a car after happy hour or at a B'nai Brith function anytime, behind a camera is another matter."

In a negative review, Salon noted:

People are curious about this movie because of what might be called extra-textual reasons, because its director is an erratic and charismatic Hollywood figure who would have totally marginalized himself by now if he didn't possess a crude gift for crafting violent pop entertainment.

==== Film industry response ====
Apocalypto gained some passionate champions in the Hollywood community. Actor Robert Duvall called it "maybe the best movie I've seen in 25 years". Director Quentin Tarantino said: "I think it's a masterpiece. It was perhaps the best film of that year. I think it was the best artistic film of that year."

Martin Scorsese, writing about the film, called it "a vision," adding,

Many pictures today don't go into troubling areas like this, the importance of violence in the perpetuation of what's known as civilization. I admire Apocalypto for its frankness, but also for the power and artistry of the filmmaking.

Actor Edward James Olmos said: "I was totally caught off guard. It's arguably the best movie I've seen in years. I was blown away."

In 2013, director Spike Lee placed the film on his list of all-time essential films.

In 2016, British director Edgar Wright named it as one of his 1,000 favorite films.

In 2022, director S.S. Rajamouli listed Apocalypto in his Sight & Sound poll.

==== Response in Mexico ====
In Mexico, the film registered a wider number of viewers than Perfume and Rocky Balboa. It even displaced memorable Mexican premieres such as Titanic and Poseidon. According to polls performed by the newspaper Reforma, 80% of polled Mexicans labeled the film as "very good" or "good".

=== Awards and nominations ===
Award	Category	Nominee	Result
Academy Awards	Best Makeup	Aldo Signoretti, Vittorio Sodano	Nominated
Academy Awards	Best Sound Editing	Sean McCormack, Kami Asgar	Nominated
Academy Awards	Best Sound Mixing	Kevin O'Connell, Greg P. Russell, Fernando Cámara	Nominated
ASC Awards	Outstanding Achievement in Cinematography in Theatrical Releases	Dean Semler	Nominated
BAFTA Awards	Best Film not in the English Language	Mel Gibson, Bruce Davey	Nominated
Broadcast Film Critics Association Awards	BFCA Award for Best Foreign Language Film		Nominated
Central Ohio Film Critics Association	COFCA Award for Best Cinematography	Dean Semler	Won
Chicago Film Critics Association Awards	CFCA Award for Best Foreign Language Film		Nominated
Dallas-Fort Worth Film Critics Association Awards	DFWFCA Award for Best Cinematography	Dean Semler	Won
First Americans in the Arts	FAITA Award for Outstanding Performance by an Actor	Rudy Youngblood	Won
First Americans in the Arts	FAITA Award for Outstanding Performance by a Supporting Actor	Morris Birdyellowhead	Won
First Americans in the Arts	Trustee Award	Mel Gibson	Won
Golden Eagle Award	Best Foreign Language Film		Nominated
Golden Globe Awards	Best Foreign Language Film		Nominated
Golden Reel Awards	Best Sound Editing in a Feature Film: Dialogue and Automated Dialogue Replacement	Sean McCormack, Kami Asgar, Scott G.G. Haller, Jessica Gallavan, Lisa J. Levine, Linda Folk	Nominated
Golden Reel Awards	Best Sound Editing for Music in a Feature Film	Dick Bernstein, Jim Henrikson	Won
Imagen Awards	Best Picture		Nominated
Imagen Awards	Best Supporting Actor	Gerardo Taracena	Won
Imagen Awards	Best Supporting Actress	Dalia Hernandez	Won
The Hollywood Reporter Key Art Awards	Best Action-Adventure Poster		Nominated
Online Film Critics Society Awards	Best Cinematography	Dean Semler	Nominated
Phoenix Film Critics Society	PFCS Award for Best Cinematography	Dean Semler	Won
Satellite Awards	Best Motion Picture, Foreign Language		Nominated
Saturn Awards	Best Director		Nominated
Saturn Awards	Best International Film	Mel Gibson	Nominated
St. Louis Gateway Film Critics Association Awards	Best Foreign Language Film		Nominated
Huckell Awards	Best Foreign Movie		Nominated
Latino Business Association	Chairman's Visionary Award	Mel Gibson	Won

== Historical accuracy ==
=== Representation of the Maya ===
Aspects of Maya culture and civilization depicted in Apocalypto are considered by some scholars to be historically inaccurate. According to Allan Wall of Banderas News, "The art, architecture and setting of the movie mixes aspects of different epochs and regions within the Mayan civilization." Some scholars felt the depiction of mass human sacrifices and widespread slavery was more typical of the Aztecs. In contrast, Mayanist David Stuart stated that human sacrifice was not rare and based on carvings and mural paintings, there are "more and greater similarities between the Aztecs and Mayas." Other scholars of Mesoamerican history criticized the film for what they said were numerous inaccuracies. Hansen published an essay on the film and a critical commentary on the criticisms of the film.

Aside from the controversy surrounding the alleged historical inaccuracies, scholars and indigenous activists were concerned over the film's highlighting the human sacrifices that occurred during the later years before the Spanish conquest.

Richard D. Hansen, a historical consultant on the film, stated in an interview with The Washington Post that the film does "give the feeling [that the Maya were] a sadistic lot", and expressed being "a little apprehensive about how the contemporary Maya will take it."Julia Guernsey, a professor of Mesoamerican art and culture, condemned the film, stating in an interview, "there's a lot of really offensive racial stereotyping. They're shown as these extremely barbaric people, when in fact, the Maya were a very sophisticated culture." Guernsey alleged that the film is seen through the lens of Western morality and argued for "alternative world views that might not match our own 21st century Western ones but are nonetheless valid."

=== Human sacrifice ===
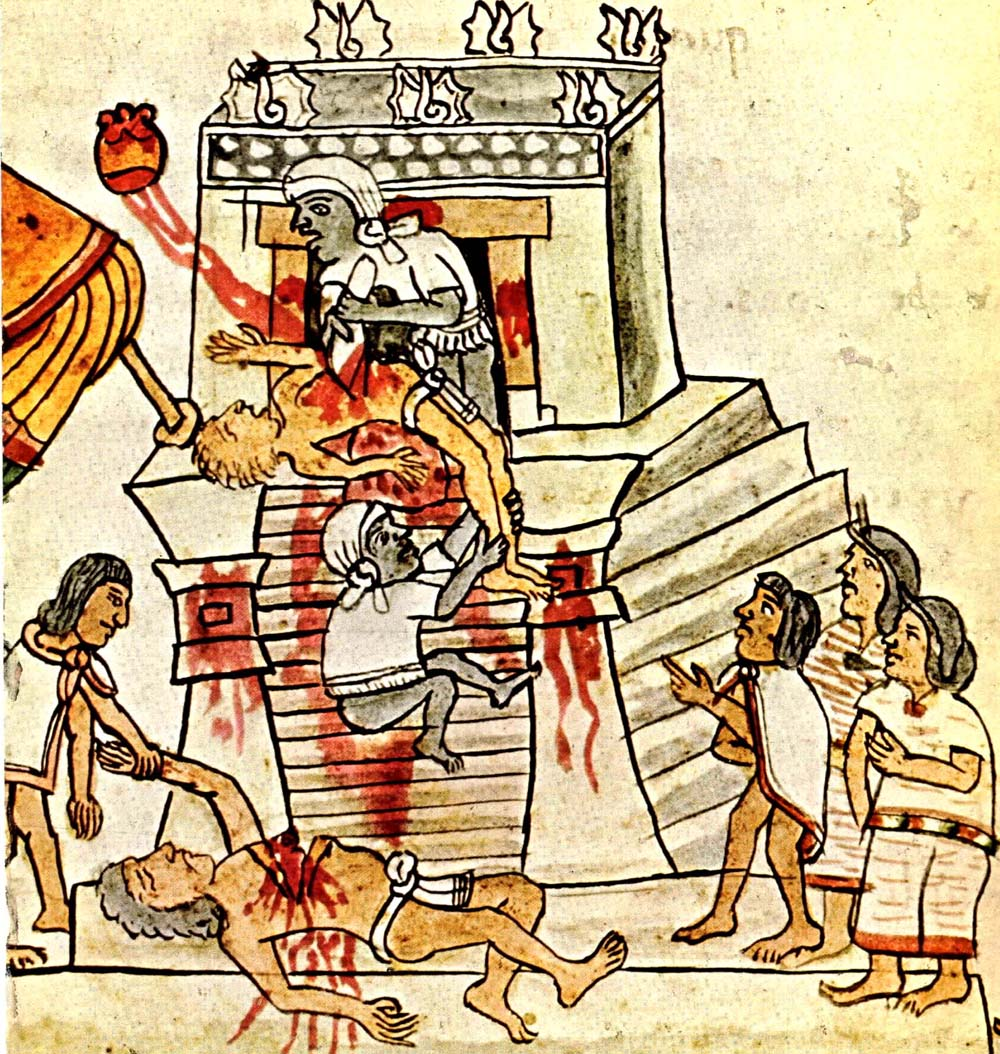
Critics claim that human sacrifices depicted in the film are more similar to Aztec practices (as seen here) than to Maya.

Apocalypto has been criticized for its depictions of mass sacrifices that were more typical for Aztecs than Mayas. Human sacrifice was "arguably less common in ancient Maya society." According to Hansen, the film depicts the post-classic period when the Maya were influenced by the Toltecs and Aztecs. Hansen states, "We know warfare was going on. The Postclassic center of Tulum is a walled city; these sites had to be in defensive positions. There was tremendous Aztec influence by this time. The Aztecs were clearly ruthless in their conquest and pursuit of sacrificial victims, a practice that spilled over into some of the Maya areas."

Other disputed depictions of the Mayas include the sacrifice of commoners and mass graves. The Mayas sacrificed nobility and societal elites instead of commoners according to Anthropology professor Stephen Houston. Archaeological sites indicate that the Mayas used several methods for sacrifice such as "decapitation, heart excision, dismemberment, hanging, disembowelment, skin flaying, skull splitting and burning." Anthropologists have also pointed out that there is no evidence of mass graves in Maya as depicted in the film. Hansen states that this is "conjecture", saying that "all [Gibson was] trying to do there is express the horror of it". Another disputed scene, when Jaguar Paw and the rest of the captives are used as target practice, was acknowledged by the filmmakers to be invented as a plot device for igniting the chase sequence.

=== Ending ===
According to the DVD commentary track by Mel Gibson and Farhad Safinia, the ending of the film was meant to depict the first contact between the Spaniards and Mayas that took place in 1511, when Spanish shipwreck survivors Gonzalo Guerrero and Jerónimo de Aguilar arrived among the Maya on the coast of the Yucatán, and also during the fourth voyage of Christopher Columbus in 1502. The arrival of the Europeans in Apocalypto and its thematic meaning are subjects of disagreement. Traci Ardren, anthropologist, wrote that the arrival of the Spanish as Christian missionaries had a "blatantly colonial message that the Mayas needed saving because they were 'rotten at the core'". According to Ardren, Apocalypto "replays, in glorious big-budget technicolor, an offensive and racist notion that Maya people were brutal to one another long before the arrival of Europeans and thus they deserved, in fact, they needed, rescue. This same idea was used for 500 years to justify the subjugation of Maya people." David van Biema, in an article written for Time, questions whether the Spaniards are portrayed as saviors of the Mayas, since they are depicted ominously with Jaguar Paw acknowledging their arrival as a threat and deciding to return to the forest.

== See also ==
- List of films featuring eclipses
- Maya civilization – Mesoamerican civilization (c. 2000 BC – 1697 AD)
- Maya warfare – Warfare of the Mesoamerican civilization
- Survival film – Film genre depicting survival efforts
