= Rudy Youngblood =

American actor and musician

- Born: September 21, 1982 (age 43); Belton, Texas, U.S.
- Occupations: Actor, musician
- Years active: 1990s–present

Rudy Youngblood (born September 21, 1982) is an American actor.

== Early life and background ==
Born in Belton, Texas, Rudy Youngblood grew up with two younger sisters. They were supported by their mother, who Rudy identifies as being of Comanche descent. Rudy has stated that his biological father was of Yaqui background.

Conservative writer David A. Yeagley told the L.A. Times, "he has no Indian blood in him that anyone can validate." At the time, Youngblood's website stated, "Rudy is from the Tahchawwickah Comanche family, his father is the late Preston Tahchawwickah. He is adopted Cree." Comanche Nation spokeswoman Jolene Schonchin states that Youngblood "is not on our tribal rolls, but he does have Comanche blood" through his father Preston Tahchawwickah. Dawn Tahchawwickah, daughter of Preston, stated that Youngblood was "only a family friend" and "nothing to my father," while Lance Tahchawwickah, Preston’s son, stated Youngblood is his brother. Youngblood told the L.A. Times that, "Preston Tahchawwickah was not his biological father but his ceremonially adoptive father" and that it was his mother who had Comanche ancestry.

== Education and early career ==
At the age of ten, he started working at construction jobs and learned skills and stories from the men. He has learned carpentry, brick laying, and other skills. He went to local schools and was competitive in boxing and track athletics while attending Belton High School. He frequently went to movies and became a fan of film. Upon graduation, he was offered scholarships to major colleges in both art and track and field, but he chose Native dance instead. He has performed with the American Indian Dance Theatre.

== Acting career ==
Going to a general casting call, Youngblood was selected by the director Mel Gibson to play the leading role of Jaguar Paw in the epic film Apocalypto (2006), in which he also performed his own stunts. He learned the Yucatec Maya language in order to appear as a tribesman in the film, in which all dialogue was in Maya. For his work in the film, he won the Best Actor award at the 15th annual First Americans in the Arts awards.

== Personal life and activism ==
Youngblood has participated in HIV activism, engaging in AIDS walks and visiting HIV-positive children in hospitals — in particular to draw attention to the rate of HIV infection in the Native community. Having seen a family member die of AIDS-related complications, he felt it important to "give back and make a difference" and has spoken out about the importance of education in combating ignorance around HIV/AIDS, alcoholism, drug abuse and child abuse.

While he grew up looking after his two younger sisters as a result of his mother's struggles with alcoholism, he and his mother have a close relationship today.

On 27 December 2024, he was arrested for threatening a police officer with a knife in Athens, Greece. While he was walking next to a police station in Kypseli, Athens, he lost his balance and almost fell on a police motorcycle. A police officer noticed him and asked if he needed any help. Rudy responded by pulling a knife at the police officer and was immediately arrested. It was later found that he was under the influence of alcohol. On 2 January 2025, it was revealed that his travel visa had expired in November 2024.

== Filmography ==
Year	Film	Role	Notes
2005	Spirit: The Seventh Fire	Warrior Protector	
2006	Apocalypto	Jaguar Paw	Won: First Americans in the Arts award for Best actor
2010	Beatdown	Brandon Becker	
2012	Into the Americas	Toowin	
2015	Windwalkers	Matty Kingston	
2016	Crossing Point	Mateo	
2018	Attrition	Infidel	
2019	Hell on the Border	Rufus Buck	
2021	Dandelion Season	Phoenix	
