= Comapa =

Comapa may refer to:

- Comapa, Jutiapa, in Guatemala
- Comapa, Veracruz, in Mexico
