= Attrition (film) =

- Theatrical release poster
- Directed by: Mathieu Weschler
- Screenplay by: Steven Seagal
- Produced by: Philippe Martinez, Steven Seagal
- Starring: Steven Seagal; Rudy Youngblood; Siu-Wong Fan; James P. Bennett
- Release date: 24 September 2018 (US)
- Running time: 85 minutes
- Country: United States
- Language: English

Attrition, also known as Final Mission, is a 2018 American Wing Chun film directed by Mathieu Weschler and produced by Saradan Media based on a screenplay by Steven Seagal. Starring Seagal, Siu-Wong Fan, and Yu Kang, the film revolves around an ex-special forces operative who comes out of retirement to rescue a Thai girl. Attrition was released direct-to-DVD on September 24, 2018.

== Plot ==
Former special forces operative Axe (Steven Seagal) emigrates to Thailand and converts to Buddhism. Axe is approached by Mr Yuen (Sonny Chatwiriyachai), who pleads with him to rescue his kidnapped eldest daughter, Tara (Ting Sue). Axe agrees and puts together a team for the job.

== Cast ==
- Steven Seagal as "Axe"
- Rudy Youngblood as "Infidel"
- Siu-Wong Fan as Chen Man
- James P. Bennett as "Scarecrow"
- Vithaya Pansringarm as Wai's Father
- Sergey Badyuk as "Hollywood"
- Ego Mikitas as Doorman
- Sonny Chatwiriyachai as Yuen
- Kat Ingkarat as "Yinying"
- Yu Kang as Qmom
- Cha-Lee Yoon as "Black Claw" Ma
- Fan Mei-sheng as Sifu

== Release ==
Originally titled Final Mission, Attrition was released on Blu-ray and DVD on September 24, 2018.

== Reception ==
A reviewer for ManlyMovie.net praised the direction and Seagal's acting, hailing it as "Seagal’s best movie since Exit Wounds." However, he was critical of the special effects, writing that the CGI blood was "the worst I’ve ever seen actually, almost like it may have even been done using over the counter software like Adobe After Effects."
