= Colonia Manuel González =

Zentla
- Location within Mexico
- Coordinates: 19°4′30″N 96°41′45″W
- Country: Mexico
- State: Veracruz
- Municipality: Zentla

Area
  - Urban: 241 km^{2} (93 sq mi)
- Elevation: 950 m (3,120 ft)

Population
  - City: 982
- Time zone: UTC-6 (Central (US Central))

Colonia Manuel González is a locality in the state of Veracruz, Mexico. It is the seat of Zentla Municipality. It has an area of 241 km^{2}.

It has an elevation of 950 meters above mean sea level.

In 1884, it was founded with the name of "Colonia Manuel González" by Italian immigrants coming mainly from the north such as Veneto, Friuli, Piedmont, Lombardia, and some southerners like Abruzzo, Sicily and Calabria. Every summer they celebrate the arrival of the Italian immigrant community. In 1926, Zentla was established as a city. The main economic activities in Zentla are agriculture, the sugar industry, and fishing. Zentla is known for its piloncillo production. The main festival is the "day of sugar" in May.
