= Paso del Macho =

Municipality in the Mexican state of Veracruz

- Municipality
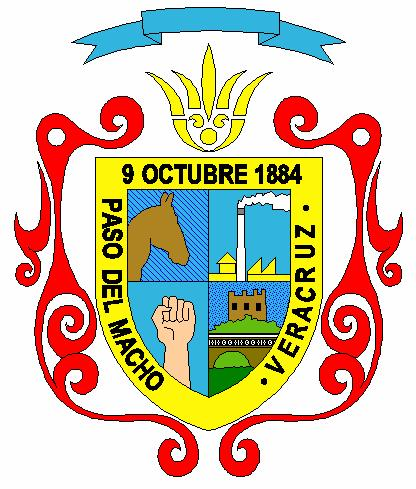
- Coat of arms

- Location in Mexico Paso del Macho (Mexico)
- Country: Mexico
- State: Veracruz
- Demonym: (in Spanish)
- Time zone: UTC−6 (CST)

Paso del Macho is a municipality in the Mexican state of Veracruz. It is located in the central zone of the state, about 70 km (43 mi) from the state capital, Xalapa. It has an area of 323.26 square kilometres (124.81 sq mi). It is located at 18°58′N 96°43′W.

== Geography ==
The municipality of Paso del Macho is delimited to the north by Zentla to the east by Carrillo Puerto to the south by Cuitláhuac, to the west by Atoyac and to the north-west by Tepatlaxco. The municipality is located in the central zone of the state; its soil presents some irregularities without importance.

The weather in Paso del Macho is warm and dry all year with rains in summer and autumn.

== Agriculture ==
It produces principally maize, beans, sugarcane, coffee and mango.

== Celebrations ==
In November takes place the celebration in honor to San Martín, patron of the town, and on the 12th of December takes place the celebration in honor of the Virgen de Guadalupe.
