= Secret History (Canadian TV series) =

Canadian documentary series

Secret History is a Canadian documentary television series, which premiered in 2021 on APTN. Created and hosted by actor Julian Black Antelope, the series blends interview segments and scripted dramatizations of historical events to tell the stories of First Nations history in Canada.

Actors who have appeared in the dramatizations have included Eugene Brave Rock, Billy Merasty, Glen Gould, Morris Birdyellowhead, Bernard Starlight and Shane Ghostkeeper, along with appearances by Black Antelope himself in the recurring role of the Trickster.

The series has aired two seasons to date, Secret History of the Wild West in 2021 and Secret History: Women Warriors in 2024.

== Awards ==
Secret History of the Wild West received 17 Rosie Award nominations from the Alberta Media Production Industries Association in 2021, winning in categories including Best Unscripted Series and Best Director (Unscripted Under 30 Minutes) for Black Antelope.

Secret History: Women Warriors won three Rosie Awards in 2024.

At the 13th Canadian Screen Awards in 2025, Black Antelope received a nomination for Best Host or Interviewer in a News or Information Program or Series.
