= Comapa, Veracruz =

Comapa
- Municipality
- Location in Mexico
- Coordinates: 19°09′54″N 96°53′08″W
- Country: Mexico
- State: Veracruz
- Established: 28 March 1831
- Seat: Comapa

Government
  - President: Carmen Cantón Croda

Area
  - Total: 311.861 km^{2} (120.410 sq mi)
- Elevation (of seat): 1,063 m (3,488 ft)

Population (2010 Census)
  - Total: 18,713
  - Estimate (2015 Intercensal Survey): 19,859
  - Density: 60.004/km^{2} (155.41/sq mi)
  - Seat: 1,421
- Time zone: UTC-6 (Central)
- Postal codes: 94200–94216
- Area code: 273
- Website: Official website

Comapa (from Nahuatl Komapan, "in the river of pots") is a municipality in the Mexican state of Veracruz, located about 40 kilometres (25 mi) south of the state capital Xalapa.

== Geography ==
The municipality of Comapa is located in the Gulf of Mexico lowlands of central Veracruz. It borders the municipalities of Puente Nacional and Tlacotepec de Mejía to the north, Totutla to the northwest, Sochiapa to the west, Huatusco to the southwest, Zentla to the south, Soledad de Doblado to the southeast, and Paso de Ovejas to the northeast. The municipality covers an area of 311.861 square kilometres (120.410 sq mi) and comprises 0.4% of the state's area.

The northern border of the municipality mostly follows the Paso Limón and Panoaya Rivers. The Panoaya (from Nahuatl Panohaya, "place where the waters pass") is an upper tributary of the Paso de Ovejas River, which itself meets the La Antigua River at La Antigua. The municipality's southern border is mostly made up by the Chavaxtla and Paso Lagartos Rivers, both tributaries of the Jamapa River.

Comapa's climate is generally warm and subhumid with rain in the summer. Average temperatures in the municipality range between 18 and 26 °C (64–79 °F), and average annual precipitation ranges between 900 and 1,600 millimetres (35–63 in).

Climate data for El Coyol weather station at 19°10′20″N 96°41′47″W, 545 m above sea level (1981–2010 averages, 1951–2010 extremes)
Month	Jan	Feb	Mar	Apr	May	Jun	Jul	Aug	Sep	Oct	Nov	Dec	Year
Record high °C (°F)	35.0 (95.0)	36.0 (96.8)	38.0 (100.4)	42.0 (107.6)	43.0 (109.4)	41.0 (105.8)	38.0 (100.4)	34.0 (93.2)	35.0 (95.0)	33.0 (91.4)	35.0 (95.0)	33.0 (91.4)	43.0 (109.4)
Mean daily maximum °C (°F)	25.0 (77.0)	26.7 (80.1)	29.0 (84.2)	31.4 (88.5)	32.5 (90.5)	31.2 (88.2)	29.5 (85.1)	29.7 (85.5)	29.3 (84.7)	28.5 (83.3)	27.2 (81.0)	25.9 (78.6)	28.8 (83.8)
Daily mean °C (°F)	19.4 (66.9)	20.5 (68.9)	22.5 (72.5)	24.8 (76.6)	26.1 (79.0)	25.6 (78.1)	24.3 (75.7)	24.4 (75.9)	24.2 (75.6)	23.2 (73.8)	21.6 (70.9)	20.2 (68.4)	23.1 (73.6)
Mean daily minimum °C (°F)	13.8 (56.8)	14.3 (57.7)	16.1 (61.0)	18.2 (64.8)	19.7 (67.5)	20.0 (68.0)	19.1 (66.4)	19.1 (66.4)	19.0 (66.2)	17.9 (64.2)	15.9 (60.6)	14.5 (58.1)	17.3 (63.1)
Record low °C (°F)	5.0 (41.0)	8.0 (46.4)	7.0 (44.6)	9.0 (48.2)	14.0 (57.2)	16.0 (60.8)	12.0 (53.6)	10.0 (50.0)	15.0 (59.0)	9.0 (48.2)	10.0 (50.0)	5.0 (41.0)	5.0 (41.0)
Average precipitation mm (inches)	29.0 (1.14)	20.0 (0.79)	21.3 (0.84)	25.1 (0.99)	76.0 (2.99)	209.7 (8.26)	213.6 (8.41)	173.9 (6.85)	165.4 (6.51)	85.6 (3.37)	35.4 (1.39)	22.9 (0.90)	1,077.9 (42.44)
Average precipitation days (≥ 0.1 mm)	3.6	2.9	3.7	2.8	4.9	9.4	10.7	9.9	9.3	6.1	4.1	3.5	70.9
Source: Servicio Meteorológico Nacional

== History ==
In pre-Hispanic times the Totonac people built a fort at Comapa. Local tradition has it that Comapa was one of the places where Guadalupe Victoria hid during his guerilla campaign in the Mexican War of Independence.

On 28 March 1831, Comapa became a municipality in the canton of Huatusco in the state of Veracruz. It became a free municipality on 15 January 1918.

== Administration ==
The municipal government comprises a president, a councillor (Spanish: síndico), and a trustee (regidor). The current president of the municipality is Carmen Cantón Croda.

== Demographics ==
In the 2010 Mexican Census, the municipality of Comapa recorded a population of 18,713 inhabitants living in 4382 households. It recorded a population of 19,859 inhabitants in the 2015 Intercensal Survey.

There are 67 localities in the municipality, of which two are classified as urban:

- The municipal seat, also called Comapa, which recorded a population of 1421 inhabitants in the 2010 Census; and
- Boca del Monte, which recorded 4832 inhabitants in 2010.

== Agriculture ==
Crops grown in the municipality include coffee, corn and sugarcane. Comapa is known for its comapeño peppers, a small orange variety eaten fresh or dried.
