= Wild Blue Moon =

- Directed by: Francesca Fisher; Taggart Siegel
- Written by: Francesca Fisher; Taggart Siegel
- Produced by: Francesca Fisher; Taggart Siegel
- Starring: Mayra Sérbulo; Thom Vernon
- Cinematography: Álex Phillips Jr.
- Edited by: Dermot McNeillage; Sonya Polonsky
- Music by: Willie & Lobo
- Release date: October 16, 1992
- Running time: 107 min (92 min)
- Country: USA-Mexico-New Zealand
- Language: Spanish

Wild Blue Moon is a 1992 USA-Mexican-New Zealand film written, directed and produced by Francesca Fisher and Taggart Siegel. It was reedited and released in 1996 in New Zealand as The Offering and later as Shadow of the Pepper Tree.

Set in the 1960s San Miguel de Allende, after being abandonded by her American lover a Mexican village girl is turns to witchcraft for revenge

Wild Blue Moon was written in Mexico beginning in 1990. Filming took place there in 1991 and 1992 before Fisher and Siegel went to New Zealand for post production. It showed at the 1992 Chicago Film Festival where the Chicago Tribune's Dave Kehr said it "distinguished by its detailed and sympathetic portrait of a little seen, non-tourist Mexico, and by the effective parallel it draws between the role of the artist in one society and the witch in the other." Showing at Ottawa's 1993 Latin American Film Festival Noel Taylor of The Ottawa Citizen says the fimmakers "avoid the temptation to rampant imagery inherent to black magic, and the hallucinations that go with it, but the film has none of the Latin magic of say, Like Water For Chocolate."

Fisher and Siegel decided they were not happy with the film so in 1995 went back and rewrote, shot and edited it, changing the focus of the film. Helen Martin in New Zealand film, 1912-1996 wrote of the re-release "Freed from the constraints of a conventional cause and effect plot structure (Why won't Luna's mother tell her what she fears? Why does Terence decide after so many years that he wants his son?), The Offering tells a modern folk tale of obsession, revenge, witchcraft, and redemption." Dennis Harvey in Variety wrote "Story development is choppy at times. While the conflict between Luna’s strong, uncomplicated morality and the irresponsibility of Terence’s countercultural set provides an offbeat, intriguing hook, latter types could be sketched more fully." Richard Scheib of Moria gave it 3 stars and says "the film, while well made, disappoints somewhat. In the end, despite the colour of its cultural portrait, it has nothing deeper to say about magic than don’t stray into the black side." Russell Baillie in Sunday Star Times calls it "an unsteady and ultimately irksome leap into the Mexican mystic."

== Cast ==
- Mayra Sérbulo as Luna
- Thom Vernon as Terence
- Malena Doria as Chantica
- Zaide Silvia Gutiérrez as Luz
- Greg Sporleder as Willie
