= Dalia Hernández =

Mexican actress (born 1985)

Dalia Hernández Armenta (born August 14, 1985) is a Mexican actress born in Veracruz, Mexico. She is known for roles in Apocalypto (2006), The Legend of the Mask (2014) and Miracle Underground (2016).

In 2007, she won an Imagen Award for best supporting actress for her role in Apocalypto. She had a role in the TV series "Capadocia del 2008" in the episode "María Magdalena" as "Rosa". In 2014 she played the role of "Nayeli" in The Legend of the Mask and as "Patricia" in the movie Miracle Underground.
