= Víctor Serralde Martínez =

Mexican politician

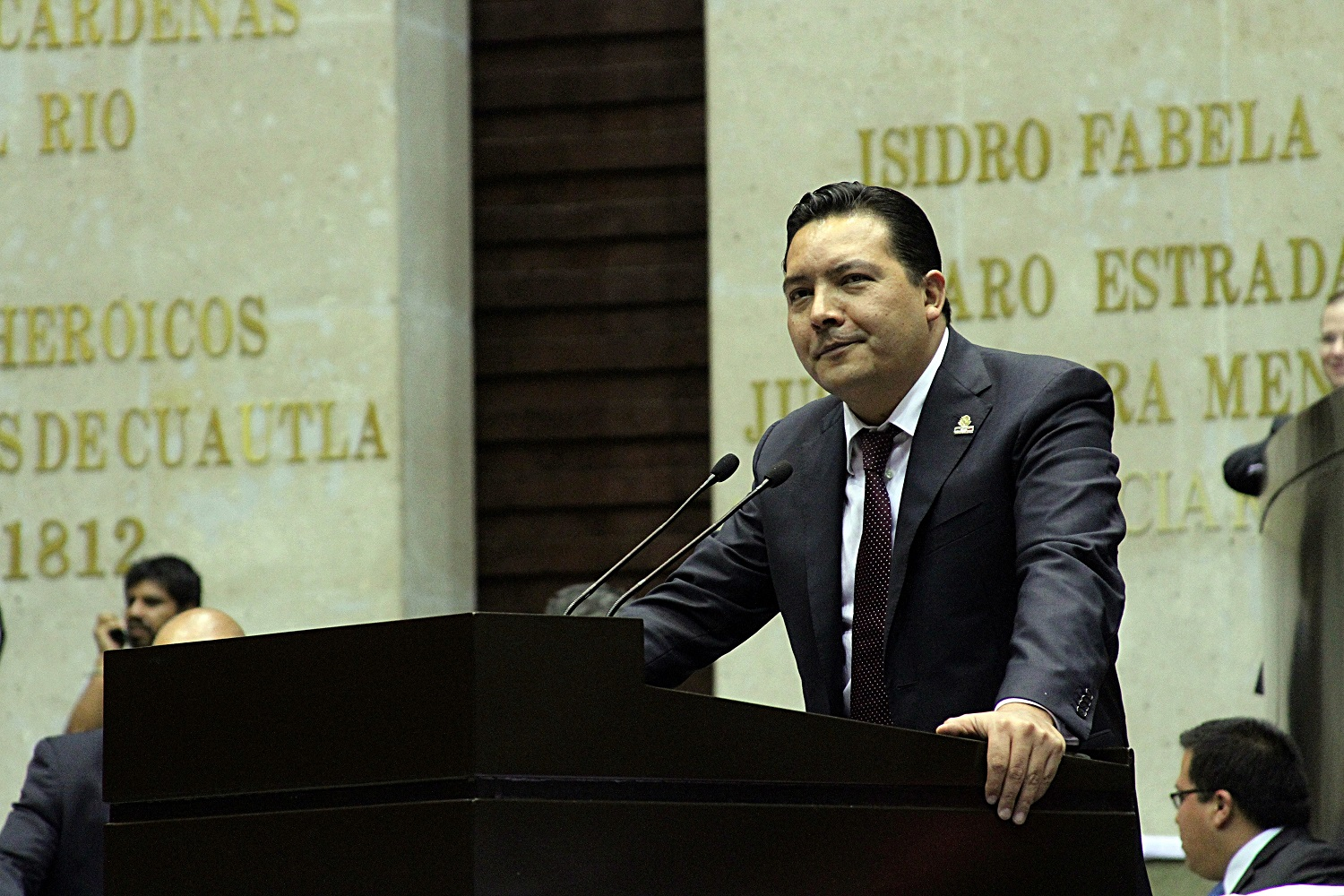
Víctor Serralde Martínez

Víctor Serralde Martínez (born 18 December 1971) is a Mexican politician from the National Action Party (PAN). He was born in Córdoba, Veracruz.

In the 2012 general election he was elected to the Chamber of Deputies to represent Veracruz's 13th district during the 62nd Congress (2012–2015). He was appointed by the plenary of Congress on 16 October 2012, as president of the Rural Development Commission, a position he was scheduled to hold until 3 August 2015.
