= Urcino Méndez Gálvez =

Mexican politician

- Born: 9 November 1961 (age 64); Veracruz, Mexico
- Occupation: Politician
- Political party: PAN

Alberto Urcino Méndez Gálvez (born 9 November 1961) is a Mexican politician affiliated with the National Action Party (PAN). In the 2003 mid-terms he was elected to the Chamber of Deputies to represent Veracruz's 13th district during the 59th Congress, and he had previously served as municipal president of Huatusco from 2001 to 2003.
