= Farhad Safinia =

American film producer

- فرهاد صفی‌نیا
- Born: 1975 (age 50–51); Tehran, Iran
- Occupations: Producer, screenwriter & director
- Spouse: Laura Regan (2007–present)
- Children: 2

Farhad Safinia (Persian: فرهاد صفی‌نیا Farhād Safīnīyā; born 1975) is an Iranian-American screenwriter, film/TV producer and director, best known for Apocalypto, Boss, and The Professor and the Madman. He was credited under the pseudonym P. B. Shemran in the latter.

== Personal life ==
Farhad Safinia was born in Tehran, Iran, in 1975. He left Iran with his family at the age of four to live in Paris, then London. He studied at Charterhouse and then at King's College, Cambridge, where he studied Economics. While at King's he directed and acted in a number of stage productions for the Cambridge University Amateur Dramatic Club and other theatre companies.

After graduating, he moved to New York City, where he studied film at the New School University and at New York University's Tisch School of the Arts. In the summer of 2007 he married actress Laura Regan in Halifax, Nova Scotia.

== Hollywood ==
Apocalypto (2006), which he co-wrote with director/producer Mel Gibson, is his first feature-length screenplay. Safinia met Gibson serving as his assistant during postproduction and promotion of The Passion of the Christ two years earlier. He was also the creator, writer and executive producer of the Starz TV series Boss. He went on to direct the 2019 film, The Professor and the Madman starring Mel Gibson. He currently lives in Los Angeles.
