= Boss (TV series) =

American political drama television series

- Genre: Political drama/thriller Psychological thriller
- Created by: Farhad Safinia
- Starring: Kelsey Grammer; Connie Nielsen; Hannah Ware; Jeff Hephner; Kathleen Robertson; Martin Donovan; Troy Garity; Jonathan Groff; Rotimi; Tip "T.I." Harris; Sanaa Lathan
- Theme music composer: Traditional, arranged by Robert Plant and Buddy Miller
- Opening theme: Robert Plant - "Satan, Your Kingdom Must Come Down"
- Ending theme: "Satan, Your Kingdom Must Come Down" (instrumental)
- Composer: Brian Reitzell
- Country of origin: United States
- Original language: English
- No. of seasons: 2
- No. of episodes: 18

Production
- Executive producers: Kelsey Grammer; Farhad Safinia; Dee Johnson; Gus Van Sant; Richard Levine; Lyn Greene; Brian Sher; Stella Bulochnikov-Stopler
- Production location: Chicago, Illinois
- Camera setup: Single-camera
- Running time: 54-60 minutes
- Production companies: Category 5 Entertainment; Grammnet Productions; Roya Productions; Old Friends Productions (Season 1); Small Wishes (Season 2); Lionsgate Television

Original release
- Network: Starz
- Release: October 21, 2011 – October 19, 2012

Boss is an American political drama television series created by Farhad Safinia. The series stars Kelsey Grammer as Tom Kane, the mayor of Chicago, who has recently been diagnosed with Lewy body dementia, a degenerative neurological disorder.

The series was broadcast in the United States on the premium television service Starz and was produced by Category 5 Entertainment, Grammnet Productions and Lionsgate Television. On September 27, 2011, before the series premiered, Starz announced that Boss had been renewed for a second season of ten episodes. The first season premiered on October 21, 2011 and the second season premiered on August 17, 2012.

On November 20, 2012, it was announced that Starz had cancelled the show. A film was discussed to finish the show's storylines, but those plans were cancelled after series creator Farhad Safinia declined to move forward with the project.

== Overview ==
As the series commences we follow Tom Kane, the Mayor of Chicago, who has been diagnosed with dementia with Lewy bodies, a degenerative neurological disorder. Determined to remain in charge, Kane conceals the disease from everyone around him except his own physician, Dr. Ella Harris. Kane's marriage to his wife Meredith is one of convenience. His closest advisors, Kitty O'Neill and Ezra Stone, begin to suspect something is wrong with the Mayor but respect the boundary he has erected that precludes asking such questions, though lapses on Kane's part begin to become apparent to others around him, such as the current Illinois governor McCall "Mac" Cullen and The Sentinel's political journalist Sam Miller. Meanwhile, Kane and his team work behind the scenes to groom State Treasurer Ben Zajac to become the next Governor of Illinois.

== Cast ==
=== Main cast ===
- Kelsey Grammer as Tom Kane, the Mayor of Chicago
- Connie Nielsen as Meredith Kane, Tom's wife
- Hannah Ware as Emma Kane, Tom Kane's estranged daughter
- Jeff Hephner as Ben Zajac, Illinois State Treasurer and candidate for Governor
- Kathleen Robertson as Kitty O'Neill, Tom Kane's personal aide
- Martin Donovan as Ezra Stone (Main cast season 1; Recurring season 2), Tom Kane's senior political advisor
- Troy Garity as Sam Miller (Recurring Season 1; Main cast Season 2), a political journalist working for The Sentinel
- Jonathan Groff as Ian Todd (Season 2), a political upstart trying to get Kane's ear
- Rotimi as Darius (Recurring Season 1; Main cast Season 2), a drug dealer with whom Emma is romantically involved
- Daniel J. Travanti as Gerald 'Babe' McGantry
- Tip "T.I." Harris as Trey (Season 2), a former gang member with designs on a career in Chicago's City Hall
- Sanaa Lathan as Mona Fredricks (Season 2), Tom Kane's new chief of staff.

=== Recurring cast ===
- Francis Guinan as McCall "Mac" Cullen (Season 1–2), Governor of Illinois, who is running for re-election
- Amy Morton as Catherine Walsh (Season 2), the Republican candidate for governor
- Nicole Forester as Maggie Zajac (Season 1–2), Ben Zajac's wife
- Karen Aldridge as Dr. Ella Harris (Season 1–2), Tom Kane's neurologist
- James Vincent Meredith as Alderman Ross (Season 1–2), an alderman serving on the Chicago City Council, from the South Side
- Anthony Mockus, Sr. as Mayor Rutledge (Season 1–2), Tom Kane's predecessor and Meredith's father, who is in a catatonic state
- Gil Bellows as Vacarro (Season 2), casino investor and Meredith's lover
- Doug James as the Grey Haired Man (Season 1–2), Tom Kane's enforcer
- Jennifer Mudge as Debra Whitehead (Season 1), caretaker / nurse to Tom Kane's father-in-law
- Ricardo Gutierrez as Alderman Mata (Season 1), an alderman serving on the Chicago City Council, representing the 30th ward
- Joe Minoso as Moco Ruiz (Season 1), the head of a construction company working on the O'Hare expansion
- Steve Lenz as Phone Monkey (Season 1–2), an aide to Tom Kane
- Danny Goldring as Ryan Kavanaugh (Season 1–2), Tom Kane's childhood friend and former homicide detective
- Richard Perez, as Alderman Ortiz
- Mary Hollis Inboden as Jackie Shope (Season 1–2), a journalist at The Sentinel working under Sam Miller

== Development and production ==
Farhad Safinia developed Boss in late 2009, with creative input from Kelsey Grammer and his production company Grammnet Productions. In November 2010, the script was shopped around to various cable networks and, following a heated and contentious bidding war, Starz placed an eight episode order for the series, based solely on the strength of the script. This was in keeping with Starz's business model of not ordering pilots but rather green-lighting projects straight-to-series. Safinia wrote the pilot, Gus Van Sant was attached to the project as director, with Grammer, Safinia, Van Sant, Richard Levine, Lyn Greene, Brian Sher and Stella Bulochnikov-Stopler serving as executive producers.

Casting announcements began in November 2010, with Grammer first to be cast. He portrays Tom Kane, "the Mayor of Chicago who is diagnosed with a degenerative mental condition that only he and his doctor know about". Next to join the series was Connie Nielsen as Meredith Kane, Tom's wife: "Meredith and Kane have a bad marriage and barely speak when they aren't in public". Jeff Hephner was next to be cast, as Ben Zajac, "the state's treasurer, an impeccably handsome and ambitious Chicago native who is clearly about to become a major player on the Chicago political scene". Hannah Ware and Kathleen Robertson were the last actors to join the main cast, with Ware playing Emma Kane, Tom Kane's estranged daughter, and Robertson playing Kitty O'Neil, Kane's personal aide.

Starz later announced that Martin Donovan, Francis Guinan, Rotimi Akinosho, Karen Aldridge, Troy Garity, Ricardo Gutierrez, James Vincent Meredith and Joe Minoso had joined the series as recurring guest stars. Martin Donovan was cast as Ezra Stone, "A savvy Yale graduate, and senior advisor to Kane, Stone knows the Mayor better than anyone. Whether it's pushing Kane's agenda, or assisting with personal matters, Ezra always delivers". Francis Guinan was cast as Governor McCall "Mac" Cullen, "The governor of Illinois, Cullen hates playing along with the Mayor's apparent unwavering support for his re-election bid. And his ugly temper is getting even worse". Rotimi Akinosho was cast as Darius, "a muscular drug dealer who's covered in tattoos, but he's smart, well spoken, and cares for his sick uncle". Karen Aldrige was cast as Dr. Ella Harris, Mayor Kane's neurologist and (initially) the only other person who knows about his current medical condition. Garity was cast as Sam Miller, "a politically savvy journalist for The Sentinel, with a nose for a real story". Ricardo Gutierrez was cast as Alderman Mata, "Political boss of the 30th ward, Mata is a thug in a suit who believes the ends justify the means, however vicious". James Vincent Meredith was cast as Alderman Ross, "Kane's biggest rival", and Joe Minoso was cast as Moco Ruiz, "A construction worker, Ruiz is one of Mata's guys".

The series was filmed between April 27, 2011, and July 27, 2011, on location in Chicago, Illinois.

At the 2011 Television Critics Association Summer Press Tour, Starz announced that Boss would premiere on October 21, 2011; the second season premiered on August 17, 2012. The series was produced by Category 5 Entertainment, Grammnet Productions, and Lionsgate Television.

== Episodes ==
=== Series overview ===
| Season | Episodes | Originally released | |
| Season | Episodes | First released | Last released |
|---|---|---|---|
| 1 | 8 | October 21, 2011 | December 9, 2011 |
| 2 | 10 | August 17, 2012 | October 19, 2012 |

=== Season 1 (2011) ===
| No. overall | No. in season | Title | Directed by | Written by | Original release date | US viewers (millions) |
|---|---|---|---|---|---|---|
| 1 | 1 | "Listen" | Gus Van Sant | Farhad Safinia | October 21, 2011 | 0.659 |
After the discovery of a serious medical condition, Mayor Tom Kane must set things in motion for the upcoming gubernatorial primary, while attempting to reconnect with his distant wife Meredith and estranged daughter Emma.
| 2 | 2 | "Reflex" | Jim McKay | Farhad Safinia | October 28, 2011 | 0.391 |
A new political force enters the race with only a few weeks until the primary. When the City Council stands in Kane's way, Kane and his crew must flex their political muscles to stay on top. Meanwhile, Meredith gets some unsettling news that adds to her growing suspicions that her husband is keeping something from her.
| 3 | 3 | "Swallow" | Mario Van Peebles | Lyn Green & Richard Levine | November 4, 2011 | 0.268 |
As Zajac's campaign gains momentum, Kane has problems adjusting to his new medical reality. An embarrassing media storm catches Governor Cullen off guard, while Miller stumbles upon a story that seeps much deeper than he imagined.
| 4 | 4 | "Slip" | Jim McKay | Bradford Winters | November 11, 2011 | 0.420 |
Kane finds himself starting to lose control, both politically and personally, as his supporters begin to question their confidence in him. Zajac ventures into uncharted territory while campaigning, as Miller continues to dig for answers.
| 5 | 5 | "Remembered" | Jean de Segonzac | Angelina Burnett | November 18, 2011 | N/A |
After long-buried information resurfaces, Kane and his camp find themselves battling the media for control of public perception. With the primary just around the corner, they have to pull out all the stops to contain the situation and keep the upper hand.
| 6 | 6 | "Spit" | Mario Van Peebles | Lyn Green & Richard Levine | November 25, 2011 | N/A |
Kane takes an unannounced break from City Hall as his political image hits an all-time low. The election looms and he'll need to enlist the help of others to weather the storm. At an emotional impasse, Kitty makes a bold move, while Meredith, increasingly suspect of Kane's behaviour, seeks opportunities of her own.
| 7 | 7 | "Stasis" | Jean de Segonzac | Bradford Winters | December 2, 2011 | 0.353 |
Just days away from the election, Kane slowly regains control over City Hall. Though a swift political move will help identify his adversaries, will doing the unthinkable improve his public image in time?
| 8 | 8 | "Choose" | Mario Van Peebles | Farhad Safinia | December 9, 2011 | 0.505 |
On Election Day, the race is close, and while the candidates campaign, Kane and Stone must do their part to turn the gears of the political machine. Emma's world is turned upside-down, while Meredith goes to great lengths to prove her allegiance to Kane.

=== Season 2 (2012) ===
| No. overall | No. in season | Title | Directed by | Written by | Original release date | US viewers (millions) |
|---|---|---|---|---|---|---|
| 9 | 1 | "Louder Than Words" | Jim McKay | Dee Johnson | August 17, 2012 | 0.317 |
Tom Kane cements his mayoral legacy with new lavish, modernized O'Hare terminals. Now Kane looks to the future, setting his sights on reviving a subsidized housing project. While his political future seems bright, Kane continues to battle for control over his disease.
| 10 | 2 | "Through and Through" | Jean de Segonzac | Bradford Winters | August 24, 2012 | 0.229 |
Kane uses a tragedy in his personal life to further his political agenda and ultimately win control over the housing authority. Kane tries to remedy his fractured inner circle by poaching his nemesis' senior aide, Mona Fredericks, and hiring ambitious newcomer Ian Todd ⏤ but will they be enough to fill the void?
| 11 | 3 | "Ablution" | Lesli Linka Glatter | Angelina Burnett | August 31, 2012 | 0.371 |
Kane grows increasingly infatuated with his new senior aide, Mona, allowing himself to get swept up in her passion for the subsidized housing project. Ben Zajac and his wife, Maggie, run the risk of alienating themselves from Kane when they take the reins of Zajac's gubernatorial campaign.
| 12 | 4 | "Redemption" | Phil Abraham | Julie Hébert | September 7, 2012 | 0.390 |
Kane makes a professional turn to a new way of doing things when he extricates the housing project from the corruption that plagues his entire city. Kane's young aide, Ian, has a threatening secret that he manages to hide from Kane. Kane tries to reconnect with his wife, Meredith, and daughter, Emma, but his attempts at harmonious family are disastrous.
| 13 | 5 | "Mania" | Jean de Segonzac | Kevin J. Hynes | September 14, 2012 | 0.382 |
Kane orders a corruption sweep and arrest several members of his own political machine. Kitty O'Neil crushes Zajac's campaign just as he is on upswing. Kane spirals out of control when his mental symptoms reach a boiling point and he can no longer distinguish between his hallucinations and reality.
| 14 | 6 | "Backflash" | Mario Van Peebles | Bradford Winters | September 21, 2012 | 0.409 |
Kane's moves with the housing project escalate from a state of unrest to rioting and looting. As Chicago burns, Kane secretly seeks treatment at an alternative clinic where his past haunts him. In Kane's absence, his wife, Meredith, steps in the mayoral role.
| 15 | 7 | "The Conversation" | Nelson McCormick | Angelina Burnett | September 28, 2012 | 0.312 |
Kane's alternative treatment seems to have worked and he is back in control of his city. Meredith moves full force into her role as Chicago's First Lady but she soon discovers Kane's obsession with his aide, Mona. Kane must remedy his public perception even if it means making an old friend collateral damage.
| 16 | 8 | "Consequence" | Jean de Segonzac | Paul Keables | October 5, 2012 | 0.436 |
In order to keep his grip on Chicago, Kane finds he has no choice but to work with Alderman Ross.
| 17 | 9 | "Clinch" | Mario Van Peebles | Julie Hébert | October 12, 2012 | 0.340 |
Chicago is bankrupt and a team of receivers pour in to take control of the city. But losing his mayoral power isn't the biggest danger to Kane as various enemies including Sentinel editor, Sam Miller, threaten to expose his illness and corruption. Does Kane have a plan in his back pocket or will he go down with his city?
| 18 | 10 | "True Enough" | Jean de Segonzac | Dee Johnson | October 19, 2012 | 0.442 |
As Kane's mental faculties deteriorate to a new low, Sentinel editor, Sam Miller, is about to break a story that will destroy him. But unbeknownst to Kane, Kitty is the true threat as she decides where her loyalties lie. As the odds stack up against Kane, he will be forced to reveal the unthinkable to stay on top.

== Reception ==
=== Awards and nominations ===
The series received two nominations for the 69th Golden Globe Awards for Best Drama Series and Kelsey Grammer received a nomination for Golden Globe Award for Best Actor – Television Series Drama. Kelsey Grammer won his category, while the show lost out to Homeland.

| Association | Year | Category | Recipient | Result |
|---|---|---|---|---|
| Critics Choice Television Awards | 2012 | Best Actor in a Drama Series | Kelsey Grammer | Nominated |
| Gold Derby Awards | 2012 | Drama Lead Actor | Kelsey Grammer | Nominated |
| Golden Globe Awards | 2012 | Best Television Series — Drama | Boss | Nominated |
| Golden Globe Awards | 2012 | Best Actor — Television Series Drama | Kelsey Grammer | Won |
| Motion Picture Sound Editors Awards | 2013 | Best Sound Editing – Short For Dialogue and ADR in Television (for "Backflash") | Kurt Nicholas Forshager; Tim Boggs; Kathryn Madsen; Jane Boegel | Nominated |
| NAACP Image Awards | 2013 | Outstanding Directing in a Drama Series (for "Backflash") | Mario Van Peebles | Nominated |

=== Ratings ===
The show garnered a total of 1.7 million viewers across multiple airings in its opening weekend. By comparison, other Starz TV series such as Spartacus: Gods of the Arena delivered 2.8 million viewers in its first weekend, Torchwood: Miracle Day produced 2 million viewers, and Camelot had 1.6 million viewers for the Friday airings alone. However, just two weeks later, the ratings had fallen to around a quarter of a million. The third episode, "Swallow", aired on November 4, 2011, averaged only 268,000 viewers — down 31% from the week before on October 28 ("Reflex"), which had just 391,000 viewers.

In an attempt to garner more television viewers, Starz shifted the season two premiere date from October 21, 2012, to August 17, 2012. This placed the season two premiere in a more advantageous state; between the finales of most summer shows on cable and the traditional launch of the fall television season, where an October launch would have been buried with many other programs. Starz also put the season two premiere full episode online for free on August 20, 2012, for a limited time.

The season two premiere had 317,000 viewers, which was less than half of the 659,000 viewers who watched the series premiere. With encores that same night, the ratings rose to 509,000 viewers. Over the weekend, the season premiere pulled in 915,000 viewers, just under the 1.1 million average in the first season.

The show's low ratings are cited as the main reason for its cancellation.

=== Critical reception ===
On Rotten Tomatoes, Season 1 has an approval rating of 76% based on reviews from 38 critics. The website's critical consensus states: "A mature drama, Boss constructs political devolution with ease and packs a powerful punch with steamy tales of corruption and sex." Season 2 has an approval rating of 86% based on reviews from 21 critics. The website's critical consensus states: "Kelsey Grammer alone provides ample reason to watch Boss, but the rest of the stellar supporting cast of wretchedly fascinating, emotionally entangled characters holds viewer attention." On Metacritic, Season 1 has a score of 78 out of 100, based on reviews from 24 critics. Season 2 has a score of 75 out of 100, based on reviews from 18 critics.

== International broadcasts ==
| Country | Network(s) | Series premiere | Timeslot |
|---|---|---|---|
| Canada | Bravo | October 9, 2013 | Wednesday 22.00 |
| United Kingdom | More4 | March 21, 2013 | Thursday 23.00 |
| Italy | Rai Tre | October 4, 2012 | Thursday 21.05 |
| Norway | VOX | September 16, 2012 | Sunday 22.10 |
| Australia | SoHo | July 4, 2012 | Wednesday 21.30 |
| Sweden | SVT2 | November 16, 2012 | Friday 22.15 |
| Spain | Canal+ 1 | December 8, 2012 | Saturday 21.30 |
| India | Star World | January 30, 2013 | Saturday 09.30 |
| Indonesia | HBO | January 2, 2013 | Monday 22.00 |
| Ireland | TG4 | January 2, 2013 | Monday 23.00 |
| Germany | FOX | March 18, 2013 | Monday 20.15 |
| Belgium | Canvas | April 7, 2014 | Monday 23.05 |
| Jamaica | CVM TV | October 23, 2014 | Thursday 21.00 |
| Mexico | Fox | October 10, 2014 | Tuesday 21:00 |
| Greece | NERIT | October 27, 2014 | Monday, Tuesday 23.00 |
| Portugal | SIC Radical | February, 2017 | Tuesday - Friday 23.50 |
