= Morris Birdyellowhead =

Canadian actor

Morris Birdyellowhead, also known as Morris Bird, is an Indigenous Canadian actor best known for his portrayal of Flint Sky in the 2006 epic film Apocalypto, directed by Mel Gibson.

== Personal life ==
He is a member of the Paul First Nation in Alberta. Morris now resides on his reserve raising children and working as an auto mechanic.

== Filmography ==
Year	Title	Role	Notes
2003	Dreamkeeper		
2005	Into the West	Good Shield	
2005	Broken Trail	Fox-Hide Brave	Episode "Part Two"
2006	Apocalypto	Flint Sky	
2007	Bury My Heart at Wounded Knee	American Horse	TV movie
2007	September Dawn	Chief Kanosh	
2007	Elijah	Charcoal	TV movie
2011	Hell on Wheels	Bull Skull	Episode: "Bread and Circuses"
2015	Diablo	Pitikwa	
2016	Lost Face	Yakaga	
2021	The Secret History of the Wild West	Low Horn	Episode "Old Soul"
