= Agustín Mollinedo Hernández =

Mexican politician

- Born: 29 October 1971 (age 54); Veracruz, Mexico
- Occupation: Politician
- Political party: PAN

Agustín Mollinedo Hernández (born 29 October 1971) is a Mexican politician from the National Action Party (PAN). In the 2006 general election he was elected to the Chamber of Deputies to represent Veracruz's 13th district during the 60th Congress.
