= Frida Rosas Peralta =

Mexican politician

- Born: 30 January 1981 (age 45); La Antigua, Veracruz, Mexico
- Occupation: Politician
- Political party: PRI

Frida Celeste Rosas Peralta (born 30 January 1981) is a Mexican politician from the Institutional Revolutionary Party. From 2011 to 2012 she served in the Chamber of Deputies during the 61st Congress, representing Veracruz's 13th district as the alternate of Felipe Amadeo Flores Espinosa.
