= Soledad de Doblado =

Municipality in the Mexican state of Veracruz

- Municipality
- Location in Mexico Soledad de Doblado (Mexico)
- Country: Mexico
- State: Veracruz
- Demonym: (in Spanish)
- Time zone: UTC−6 (CST)

Soledad de Doblado is a municipality located in the semiarid zone of the center of the Mexican state of Veracruz, in the plains of the Sotavento of Veracruz, about 75 km from the state capital of Xalapa. It has a surface of 370.96 km^{2}. It is located at 19°03′N 96°25′W. On June 16, 1896, by Decree the town was named Soledad de Doblado, in honor of Manuel Doblado, who signed in this place, on February 19, 1862, the preliminary agreements with the representatives of England, Spain and France. By a decree of November 16, 1961 it rose to the category of city.

== Geography ==
The municipality of Soledad de Doblado is delimited to the north by Paso de Ovejas, to the east by Manlio Fabio Altamirano, to the south-east by Jamapa, to the south by Cotaxtla, to the west by Comapa and Carrillo Puerto. It is watered by the Jamapa river that together with the Cotaxtla river, they end in the Gulf of Mexico, forming the Bar of Boca del río.

The weather in Soledad de Doblado is warm and dry all year with rains in summer.

== Agriculture ==
It produces principally maize, beans, watermelon, green chile, sugarcane, orange fruit and mango.

== Celebrations ==
The celebration in honor of the Virgen de la Candelaria takes place in February, and the celebration in honor of the Virgen de Guadalupe takes place in December. The patron saint of the town is the Virgen de la Soledad and is celebrated also in December 18.
