= Fernando Cámara =

Mexican sound engineer

- Occupation: Sound engineer
- Years active: 1979 – present

Fernando Cámara is a Mexican sound engineer. He was nominated for an Academy Award in the category Best Sound Mixing for the film Apocalypto. He has worked on over 30 films since 1979.

== Selected filmography ==
- Apocalypto (2006)
