= Mayra Sérbulo =

Mexican actress

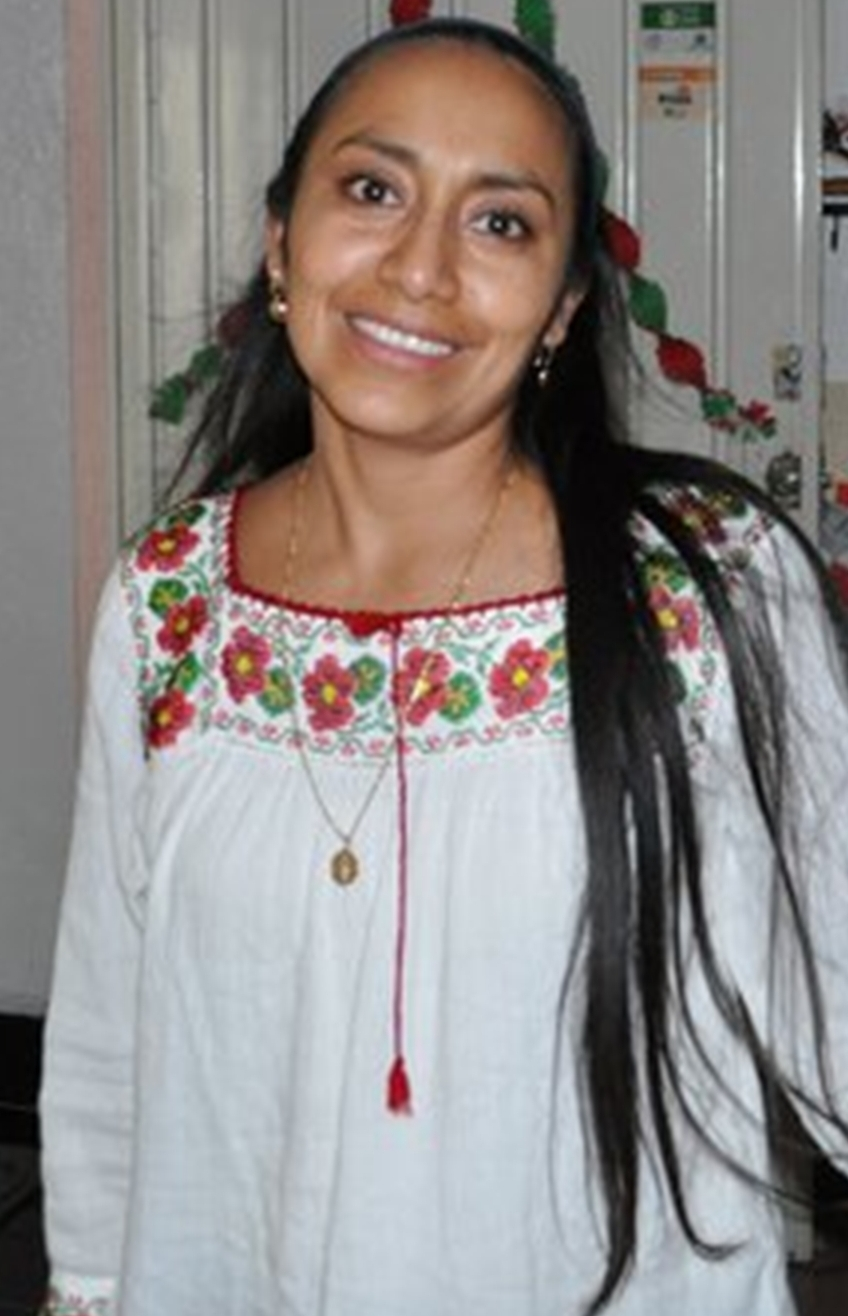
- Occupation: Actress

Mayra Sérbulo is a Mexican film, theater and television actress born in Santa María Jalapa del Marqués, Oaxaca, Mexico. She has participated in several soap operas and films including some films of Hollywood as Wild Blue Moon, The Mexican, Shadow of the Pepper Tree and Apocalypto.

== Career ==
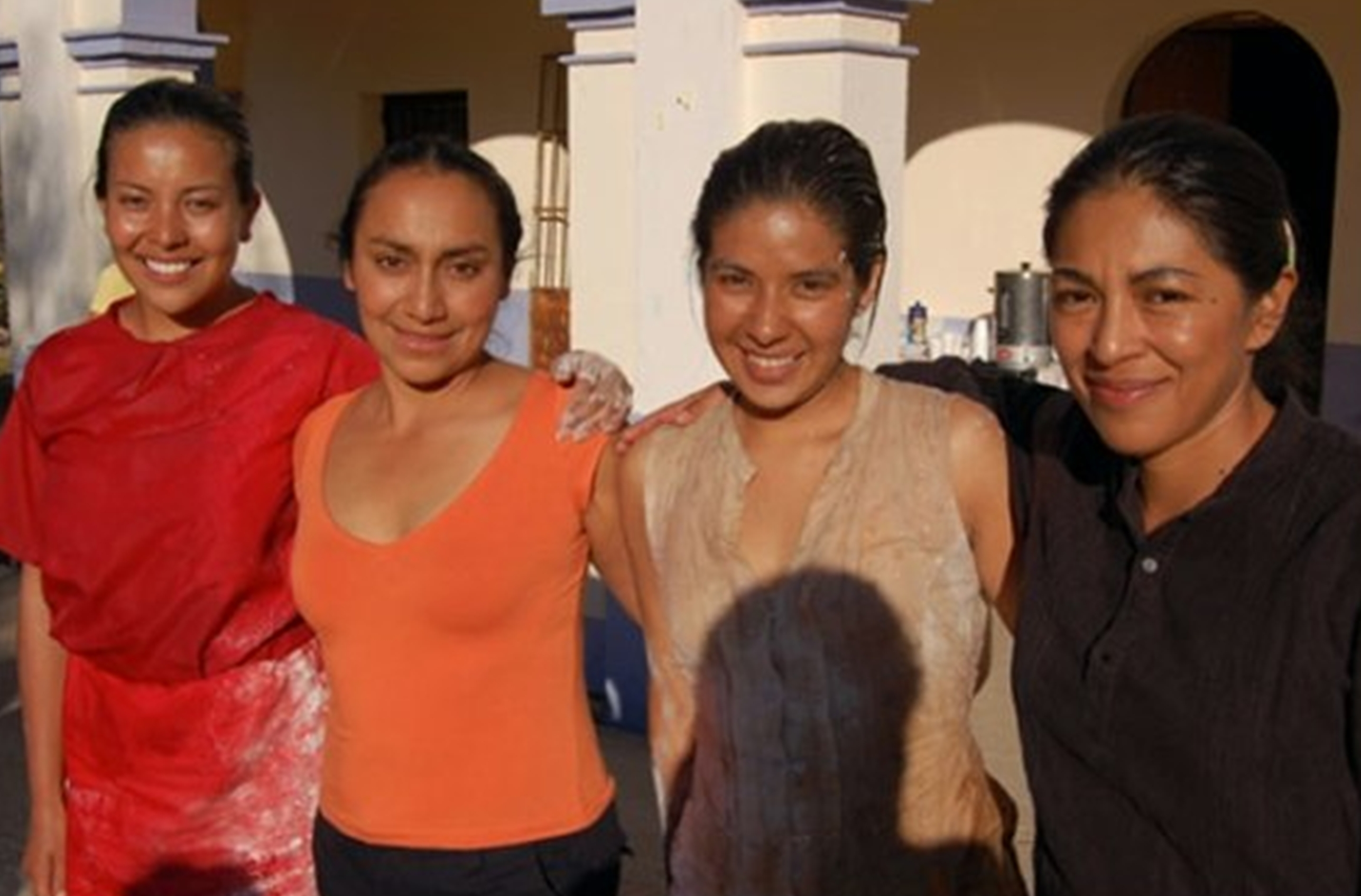
Sérbulo during the filming of the film Spiral.

From an early age Sérbulo always showed interest in art, and at fifteen years old she entered the Center for Arts Education (CEDART) in the Oaxaca City. There she received initial training in various artistic disciplines such as dance, acting, and visual arts. Upon completion of her studies at Oaxaca moved to Mexico City and 1987, she decided to audition in the "University Center Theater (CUT)" of "National Autonomous University of Mexico (UNAM)" where it she was accepted. From that moment on she began her training in drama and in June 1990 she got her first film role in the film Cabeza de Vaca of Nicolas Echevarria, and September 15 of the same year, she debuted in the "University Theatre" with the play The Golden Altarpiece written and directed by José Sanchis Sinisterra.

In 1992 she landed a small role in American film Wild Blue Moon later participated in Mexican films as Making the Fight and Bride See you where did not have much impact their characters was not until 1995 that Mayra started to emphasize in the film industry to participate in the foreign film Shadow of the Pepper Tree and from that moment her career as an actress began to take off.

In 2001 she participated in the American film The Mexican where she shared her credits with Julia Roberts and Brad Pitt despite the role she played in this film was not earned principal various international awards in the same year was cast as the character 'Mabel Juárez de Carranza' in the Mexican film Y tu mamá también by Alfonso Cuarón.

In 2006 she achieved international fame with her role in Mel Gibson's Apocalypto (2006), which would go on to be one of the highest grossing films of that year.

In 2009 she starred in the Mexican film Spiral by Mexican filmmaker Jorge Pérez Solano where she starred as "Diamantina". Mayra has been nominated Sérbulo 4 Ariel "Best actress" now has a career spanning 20 years, participated in works of theater television and cine is one of the most recognized actresses Mexico internationally.

In 2017 she started playing María in "Todos Santos", a theatre monologue written by Mónica Perea, directed by Sixto Castro Santillán, and music performed live by Ariel Torres. "Todos Santos" is the story of María, a domestic servant just about to leave to her hometown's party. While she prepares her boss´ dinner, she tells us what made her run from her town and why she must go celebrate her departed relatives in the Day of the Death. In between honest laughter and unbearable pain and tears, "Todos Santos" talks through several important harsh facts that indigenous people live in Mexico everyday, from the entrance of drug traffic to the forced displacement of their hometowns. "Todos Santos" rapidly became a great success in Mexico City after being presented in all major theatres between 2017 and early 2019.

== Filmography ==
=== Movies ===
- 1991: Cabeza de Vaca
- 1992: Wild Blue Moon
- 1993: Haciendo la lucha
- 1994: Novia que te vea
- 1995: Shadow of the Pepper Tree
- 1996: ¿Que hora es?
- 1998: Un Embrujo
- 2001: The Mexican
- 2001: Y tu mamá también
- 2002: Cuento de hadas para dormir cocodrilos
- 2004: Mezcal
- 2006: Apocalypto
- 2007: La Zona
- 2008: Beverly Hills Chihuahua
- 2009: Amar a Morir
- 2009: Espiral
- 2012: Get the Gringo

=== Television ===
- Lo que Callamos las Mujeres
- La Heredera
- Vidas Robadas
- Texas Rising
