= Sochiapa =

Municipality in the Mexican state of Veracruz

- Municipality
- Location in Mexico Sochiapa (Mexico)
- Country: Mexico
- State: Veracruz
- Demonym: (in Spanish)
- Time zone: UTC−6 (CST)

Sochiapa is a municipality located in the central zone of the Mexican State of Veracruz, about 40 km from the state capital Xalapa. It has a surface of 21.39 km^{2}. It is located at 19°12′N 96°56′W. For decree of December 10, 1913 suprimió Sochiapa's municipality, passing its territory to form a part of that of Totutla. Later Sochiapa recovered its political category.

== Geography ==
The municipality of Sochiapa is delimited to the north and northeast by Totutla, to the southeast by Comapa, to the south by Huatusco and to the west by Tlaltetela.

It is watered by small creeks which are tributaries of the Jamapa River.

The weather in Sochiapa is cold and wet all year with rains in summer and autumn.

== Agriculture ==
It produces principally maize, coffee and sugarcane.

== Celebrations ==
In Sochiapa, the celebration in honor to San Juan Nepomuseno, Patron of the town, takes place in May, and the celebration in honor to Virgen de Guadalupe takes place in December.
