= Tlacotepec de Mejía =

Municipality in Mexico

- Municipality
- Location in Mexico Tlacotepec de Mejía (Mexico)
- Country: Mexico
- State: Veracruz
- Demonym: (in Spanish)
- Time zone: UTC−6 (CST)

Tlacotepec de Mejía is a municipality located in the montane central zone in the Mexican state of Veracruz, about 40 km from the state capital Xalapa. It has a surface of 90.48 km^{2}. It is located at 19°12′N 96°50′W.

== Name ==
The name comes from the language Náhuatl, Tlaco-tepec; that means "In the hill of the sticks of wood".

== Geography ==
The municipality of Tlacotepec de Mejía is delimited to the north by Totutla, to the east by Puente Nacional and to the south by Comapa. It is watered by the rivers Atliyac and Paso de Ovejas that are tributaries of the river La Antigua.

The weather in Tlacotepec de Mejía is cold and wet all year with rains in summer and autumn.

== Agriculture ==
It produces principally maize, coffee and sugarcane.

== Celebrations ==
In Tlacotepec de Mejía, the celebration in honor to San Martín Caballero takes place in November, Patron of the town, and the celebration in honor to Virgen de Guadalupe takes place in December.
