= El Palmar (Maya site) =

Ancient Maya city in Campeche, Mexico

Coordinates: 18°04′34″N 89°20′34″W

- Wak Piit
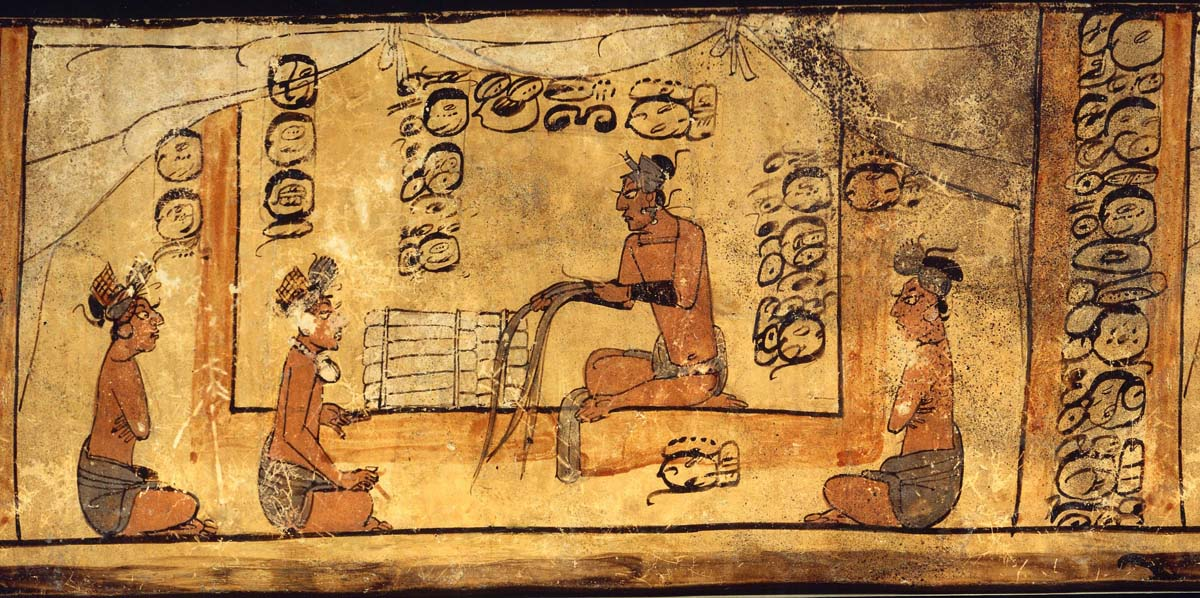
- Ceramic vessel with a palace scene from the royal court of El Palmar
- Interactive map of El Palmar
- Type: Ancient Maya city
- Periods: Preclassic - Late Classic
- Cultures: Maya civilization
- Location: Mexico
- Region: Calakmul Biosphere Reserve

History
- Built: 300 BC - 880 AD
- Built by: Wak Piit dynasty
- Abandoned: 900 AD

Site notes
- Area: 94 km^{2} (36 sq mi)
- Discovered: 1936
- Public access: closed

El Palmar, originally called Wak Piit (Six Palanquins), is an archaeological site and ancient city of the pre-Columbian Maya civilization located within the Calakmul Biosphere Reserve in southeast Campeche, Mexico. It was a large Maya city with an occupation established since the late Preclassic period around 300 BC, it flourished during the early Classic period under the rule of a powerful dynasty that held several royal titles and had a royal court of high-level priests, officials, and scribes, which gave the city a great relevance in regional geopolitics. It reached its peak in the Late Classic period, during which the city developed an intense political activity, maintaining a vast network of alliances with distant sites, which made it one of the strongest political entities in southern Campeche.

El Palmar is one of the largest archaeological sites in the region and extends over a vast area of 94 km², it consists of several archaeological complexes of monumental architecture with more than 10,000 identified structures, including plazas with large pyramidal bases, temples, palaces, 15 ball courts and numerous residential and ceremonial buildings. Each architectural complex had a specific function within the city, like ceremonial, agricultural or residential groups and also for lithic production. The main ceremonial center was designed to represent the sacred geography of Maya mythology, while other complexes functioned as high-ranking residences, such as the Guzmán Group, which was the residence of an important elite group from El Palmar known for having the title of Lakam (standard-bearers) who made diplomatic functions representing El Palmar throughout the Maya region, acting as emissaries in the political and military alliances of the city's rulers with other political entities.

Some of the most important findings at El Palmar are a large number of high-quality monuments, including a large stairway with hieroglyphic inscriptions, altars, and more than 60 stelae such as Stela 46 from the Late Preclassic period, which contains the Mesoamerican Long Count date of 8.7.0.0.0, corresponding to September 5, 179 AD, the earliest Long Count date recorded by the Maya culture and also the earliest date recorded in the Maya Lowlands.

The ancient Maya city of El Palmar was discovered and documented for the first time in 1936 by archaeologist Eric S. Thompson during an archaeological expedition in southern Campeche. Most of the archaeological site is buried beneath the thick jungle of the region within the ejido of Kiché las Pailas in the Calakmul municipality.

== History ==
According to archaeological research, the occupation and initial settlement of El Palmar dates back to the late Preclassic period of the Maya civilization around 300 BC. The rulers of El Palmar used the title of Wak Piit which means "Six Palanquins" denoting their monarchical identity and high rank. The dynasty was active since ancient times in the transitional period between the late Preclassic period to the early Classic period of the Mayan civilization known as the Protoclassic period, according to the inscriptions, it had a sequence that lasted at least from the 2nd to the 9th century AD. The title of sak ho’ok was one of the royal titles used by the dynasty of El Palmar; it was worn by both the rulers and the royal court of the city, including master sculptors and scribes whose skills and knowledge were limited only to the elites. Since early dates the city and its dynasty showed its power to erect monuments such as El Palmar Stela 46 , which contains the long count date of 8.7.0.0.0 corresponding to September 5, 179 AD, making it the Maya stela with the earliest written date in the entire Maya Lowlands.

The royal court of El Palmar included an important group known as the Lakam, or "standard-bearers" who performed various diplomatic functions, acting as ambassadors representing the city and carrying the emblem of their ruling house when traveling to other major cities in the region. The residence of the lakam was located in the architectural complex known as the Guzmán Group, a few kilometers from the city's center. One of the most important Lakam officials in the history of El Palmar was the ambassador Ajpach’ Waal, who had an extensive hieroglyphic stairway dedicated to him in a temple of the Guzmán Group, which records that on June 24, 726 AD, he arrived in Copán and met with its ruler Uaxaclajuun Ub'aah K'awiil to forge an alliance under the supervision of Yuknoom Took' K'awiil of Calakmul. A ceramic vessel from El Palmar named "El Señor del Petén" (The Lord of Peten) found at the Nuevo Veracruz complex of the Icaiché archaeological site in southern Quintana Roo, shows a palace scene in which the royal court of El Palmar, conformed by two priests with the title of aj’kuhu’n (worshipper), an heir to the throne referred to as a baahtz’am ch’ok, and another member of the elite who held the title of sak ho’ok, hold an audience with the ruler Aj Sak Bopat, who held several titles of royal authority such as Wak Piit Ajaw (lord of Wak Piit, the title of the rulers of the city), sak ho’ok, and baahkab (“First on Earth”), used to refer to high rank in the Maya nobility.
