= Apoch'Waal =

Apoch'Waal was an 8th-century Maya lakam, or standard-bearer. He inherited his father's position as lakam for the ajaw of Calakmul, and acted as a diplomatic emissary between the ajaws of Calakmul and Copán. In 726 CE, Apoch'Waal successfully established an alliance between Calakmul and Copán, which he commemorated through a ceremonial platform and temple built for himself at El Palmar. This temple, labeled as Structure GZ1 at El Palmar, is also the site of Apoch'Waal's grave. Studies of his body have revealed insights into Maya elite life in the late Classic period.

== Tomb ==
Apoch'Waal's platform and temple was likely constructed at great expense, indicating the owner's wealth and power. In contrast, his sealed tomb contained just two decorated pots and his body when opened by archaeologists. This indicates that Apoch'Waal died during or after a period of significant political turbulence, and reveals the impact that period had on the ruling elites of Calakmul. His skeleton shows that he died a middle-aged man, between the age of 30 and 50; wear and tear on the bones show signs of arthritis in his hands, elbows, knees, and feet, suggesting a life of constant foot travel on rough terrain. Signs of childhood malnutrition suggest a harsh upbringing, despite his status as a high-ranking elite. Apoch'Waal had inlay dental modification done on his upper front teeth, fitting them with jade and pyrite, with one apparently having fallen out without replacement long before his death, another sign that he had fallen on hard times.
