= Felipe Amadeo Flores Espinosa =

Mexican politician

- Born: 5 February 1947 (age 79); Cotaxtla, Veracruz, Mexico
- Education: Universidad Veracruzana
- Occupation: Politician
- Political party: PRI

Felipe Amadeo Flores Espinosa (born 5 February 1947) is a Mexican politician from the Institutional Revolutionary Party (PRI).

Born in Cotaxtla, Veracruz, he has served in the Chamber of Deputies on two occasions: during the 56th Congress (1994–1997), for the 8th district of Veracruz, and during the 61st Congress (2009–2012), when he represented the 13th district of Veracruz.

He resigned the latter seat on 11 October 2011 to take office as the attorney-general of Veracruz in the administration of Javier Duarte and was replaced by his alternate, Frida Celeste Rosas Peralta. He resigned from that position on 19 February 2014 "for personal reasons".

He was previously the state president of the PRI in 1992–1995 and served two terms in the Congress of Veracruz (1989–1992 and 2001–2004).
