= Carrillo Puerto (municipality) =

Municipality in Veracruz, Mexico

- Municipality
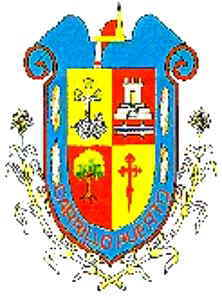
- Coat of arms

- In Veracruz
- Country: Mexico
- State: Veracruz
- Region: Mountains Region
- Seat: Tamarindo

Area
  - Municipality: 250 km^{2} (97 sq mi)
- Elevation: 200 m (660 ft)

Population (2020)
  - Municipality: 18,888
- Time zone: UTC-6 (Central (US Central))
- Postal code: 94980

Carrillo Puerto is a municipality in the Mexican state of Veracruz. It is located in the central area of the State of Veracruz, at 18°47′N 96°34′W. It has a surface of 246.76 km^{2} and a population of 18,888 as of 2020. Its seat is Tamarindo (1,209 inhabitants) and its most populated town is El Palmar (1,259).

== Geography ==
The municipality of Carrillo Puerto is delimited to the north by Paso del Macho, to the north-east by Soledad de Doblado, to the east by Cotaxtla, to the south-east by Cuichapa and to the west by Cuitláhuac.

Weather in Carrillo Puerto is warm and dry most of the year, with a rainy season in Summer.

== Economy ==
Its main crops are maize and beans.

== Culture ==
The main popular celebration takes place in May, to honor Isidore the Laborer, patron saint of the town.
