= Tepatlaxco =

Municipality in Veracruz, Mexico

- Municipality
- Location in Mexico Tepatlaxco (Mexico)
- Country: Mexico
- State: Veracruz
- Demonym: (in Spanish)
- Time zone: UTC−6 (CST)

Tepatlaxco is a municipality located in the montane central zone in the Mexican state of Veracruz, about 55 km from the state capital Xalapa. It has a surface of 99.53 km^{2}. It is located at 19°04′N 96°51′W. During the 18th century he is named the people San Martín Ocotitlán, By decree of June 23, 1890 the limits were fixed between the municipalities of Tepatlaxco and Ixhuatlan.

== Geography ==
The municipality of Tepatlaxco is delimited to the north by Huatusco, to the north-east by Zentla, to the south-east by Paso del Macho, to the south by Atoyac and to the west by Ixhuatlán del Café. It is watered by small creeks that are a tributary of the river Jamapa.

The weather in Tepatlaxco is cold and wet all year with rains in summer and autumn.

== Agriculture ==
It produces principally maize, beans, sugarcane, and coffee.

== Celebrations ==
In Tepatlaxco, the celebration in honor to San Antonio de Padua, Patrón of the town takes place in June, and the celebration in honor to Virgen de Guadalupe takes place in December.
