= El Palmar, Dominican Republic =

El Palmar
- Location within the Dominican Republic
- Coordinates: 18°25′12″N 71°13′48″W
- Country: Dominican Republic
- Province: Baoruco

Population (2008)
  - Total: 2,445

El Palmar is a town in the Baoruco province of the Dominican Republic.

== Sources ==
- World Gazeteer: Dominican Republic – World-Gazetteer.com
