= First Americans in the Arts =

First Americans in the Arts official logo

First Americans in the Arts (FAITA) is a non-profit organization based in Beverly Hills, California. According to its website, the organization was created "to recognize, honor and promote" Native Americans in the United States and specifically their "participation in the powerful arena of the entertainment industry, incorporating the areas of film, television, music and theater."

In 2022, the organization's website is no longer in a responsive aspect and the status of the organization is unclear.
