= Paso de Ovejas =

- City and municipality
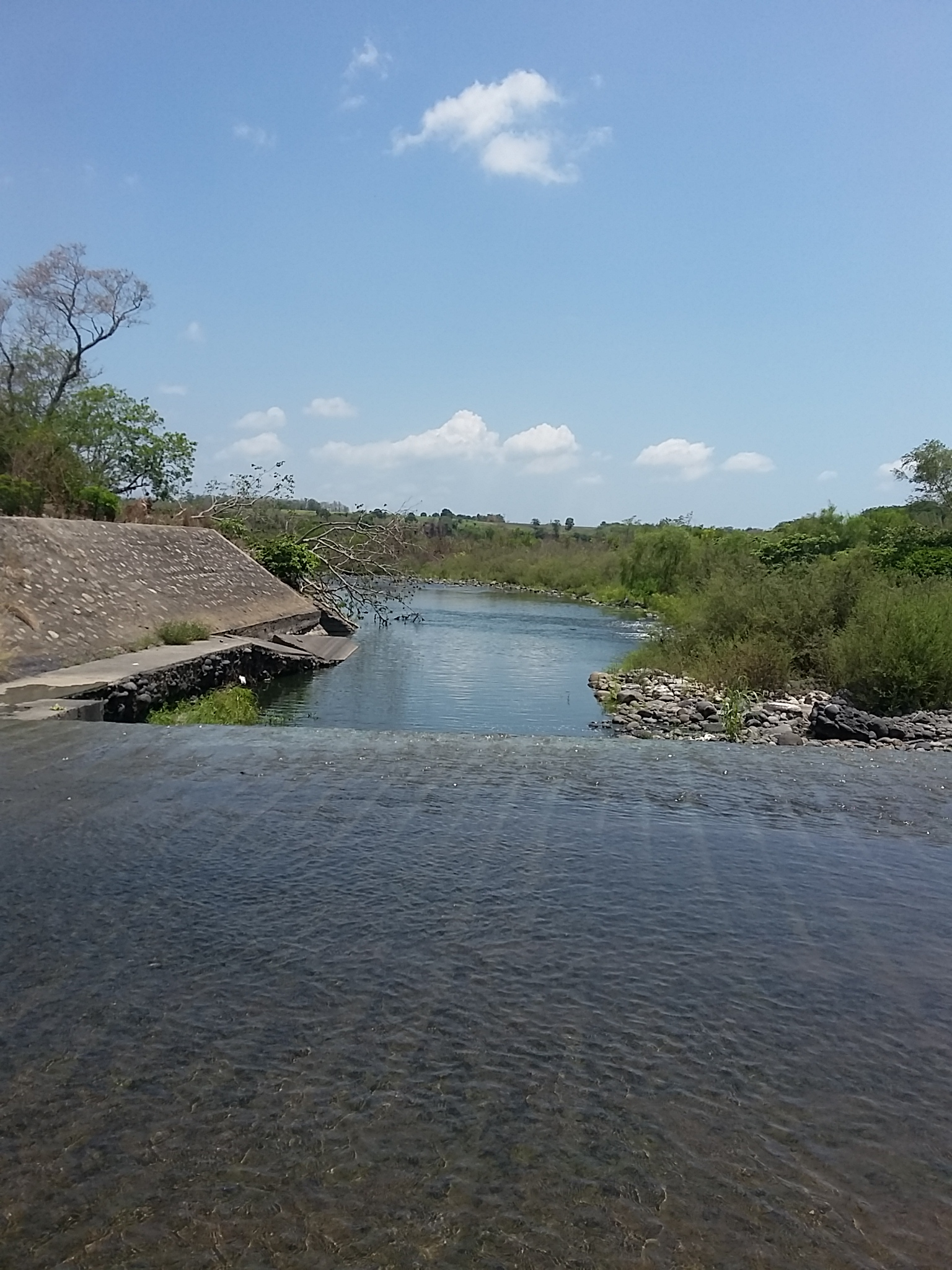
- "El Guayabal" dam

- Location within Veracruz Location within Mexico
- Coordinates: 19.285°N 96.440°W
- Country: Mexico
- State: Veracruz

Population (2020)
  - Municipality: 33,422
  - Seat: 7,468 (2010)
- Time zone: UTC-6 (Central)
- Website: pasodeovejas.emunicipios.gob.mx

Paso de Ovejas (Spanish: Sheep's Crossway) is a city in the Mexican state of Veracruz. It serves as the municipal seat for the surrounding municipality of the same name.

Paso de Ovejas is bordered by La Antigua, the port of Veracruz, and Puente Nacional. It is on the railroad and on Federal Highways 180 and 190.

The city of Paso de Ovejas, along with the city of Catemaco, Veracruz, was one of two cities used for most of the filming of Apocalypto (a 2006 film produced by Mel Gibson).

Its population is 33,442 people in 2020.
