= Cuitláhuac, Veracruz =

Cuitláhuac
- City and municipality
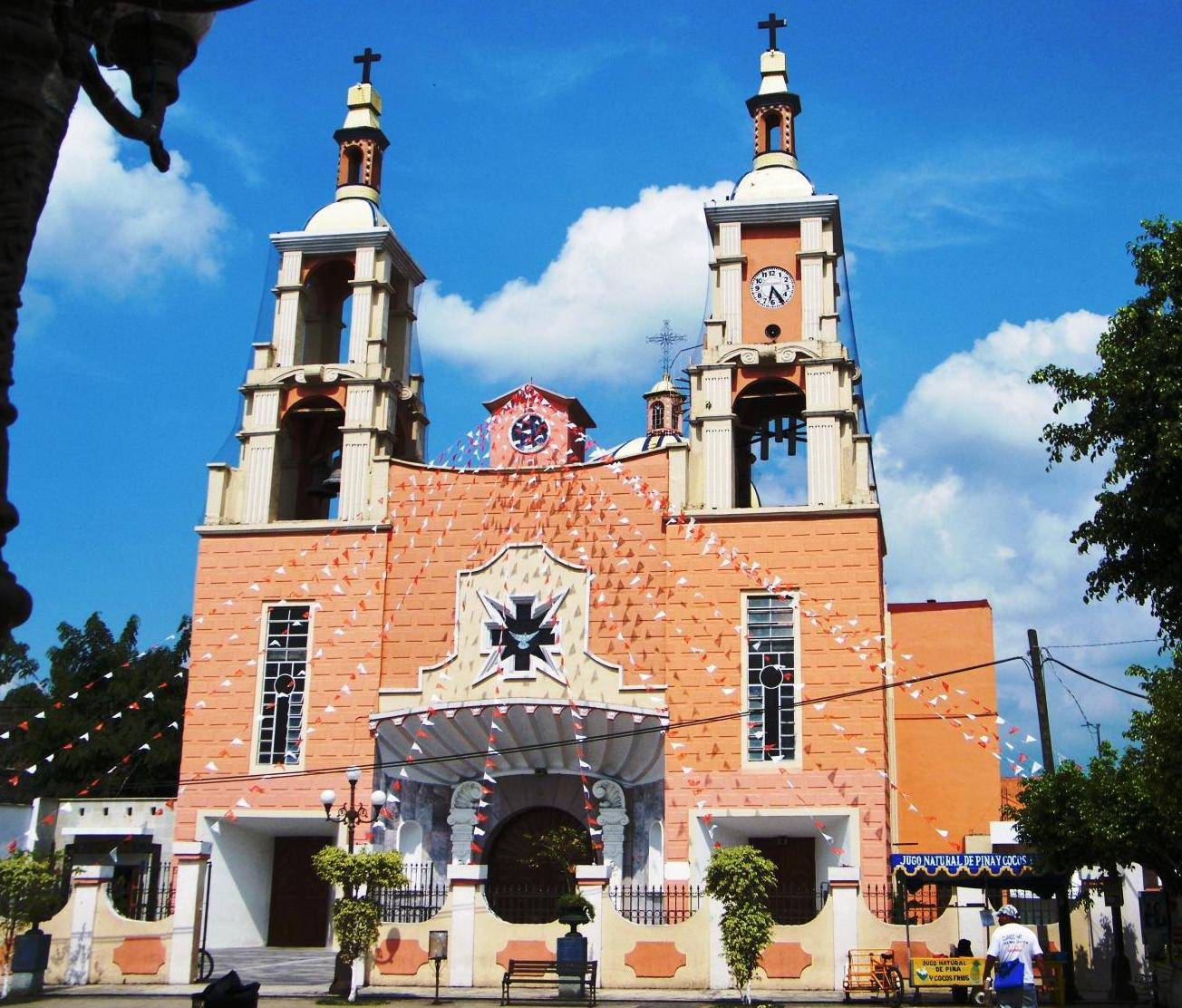
- La Iglesia de San Juan Bautista

- Location in Veracruz Cuitláhuac (Mexico)
- Coordinates: 18°48′52″N 96°43′20″W
- Country: Mexico
- State: Veracruz
- Region: Mountains Region
- Elevation: 371 m (1,217 ft)

Population (2020)
  - Municipality: 28,075
  - Seat: 14,304
- Time zone: UTC-6 (Central Standard Time)
- Postal code: 94910

Cuitláhuac (Spanish: [kwitˈlawak]) is a municipality in the Mexican state of Veracruz. It is named after Cuitláhuac, the 10th tlatoani (ruler) of the Aztec city of Tenochtitlan for 80 days during the year Two Flint (1520).

== Notable people ==
- Ricardo Rincón (born 1970), baseball player
