= Zentla =

Municipality in Veracruz, Mexico

Coordinates: 19.0750°N 96.6958°W

- Municipality
- Location in Mexico Zentla (Mexico)
- Country: Mexico
- State: Veracruz
- Demonym: (in Spanish)
- Time zone: UTC−6 (CST)

Zentla is a municipality in the Mexican state of Veracruz. The seat is Colonia Manuel González.

As of 2020, the location had a population of 12,581 people.
