= Huasteca Baja Region =

- Region
- Country: Mexico
- State: Veracruz
- Largest city: Tuxpan

Area
  - Total: 7,076 km^{2} (2,732 sq mi)

Population (2020)
  - Total: 563,485
- Time zone: UTC−6 (CST)

The Huasteca Baja region is one of the regions of the Mexican state of Veracruz. It is part of the broader Huasteca region that comprises parts of the states of Tamaulipas, Veracruz, Puebla, Hidalgo, San Luis Potosí, Querétaro and Guanajuato.

== Municipalities ==
México | Veracruz | Municipalities

1) Huayacocotla
2) Ilamatlán
3) Zontecomatlán de López y Fuentes
4) Texcatepec
5) Zacualpan
6) Benito Juárez
7) Tlachichilco
8) Ixcatepec
9) Chicontepec
10) Ixhuatlán de Madero
11) Chontla
12) Tepetzintla
13) Álamo Temapache
14) Castillo de Teayo
15) Citlaltépetl
16) Tancoco
17) Cerro Azul
18) Tuxpan

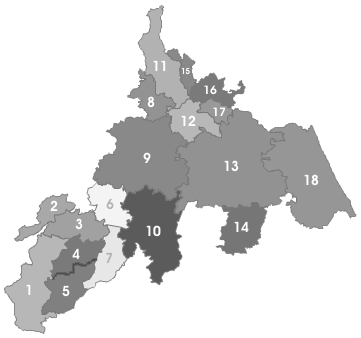

Municipality code	Name	Population		Land Area			Population density	
Municipality code	Name	2020	Rank	km^{2}	sq mi	Rank	2020	Rank
160	Álamo Temapache	107,270	2	1,277.1	493.1	1	84/km^{2} (218/sq mi)	5
027	Benito Juárez	16,120	8	232.6	89.8	10	69/km^{2} (179/sq mi)	9
157	Castillo de Teayo	20,145	7	272.6	105.3	7	74/km^{2} (191/sq mi)	7
034	Cerro Azul	25,011	5	91	35	17	275/km^{2} (712/sq mi)	1
058	Chicontepec	53,858	3	936.5	361.6	3	58/km^{2} (149/sq mi)	12
063	Chontla	13,359	12	390.5	150.8	6	34/km^{2} (89/sq mi)	17
035	Citlaltépetl	11,165	14	81.3	31.4	18	137/km^{2} (356/sq mi)	3
072	Huayacocotla	21,796	6	522.3	201.7	5	42/km^{2} (42/km^{2})	15
076	Ilamatlán	13,377	11	155.3	60.0	16	86/km^{2} (223/sq mi)	4
078	Ixcatepec	12,379	13	176.9	68.3	14	70/km^{2} (181/sq mi)	8
083	Ixhuatlán de Madero	50,836	4	669.2	258.4	4	76/km^{2} (197/sq mi)	6
153	Tancoco	5,795	18	156.2	60.3	15	37/km^{2} (96/sq mi)	16
167	Tepetzintla	14,619	10	227.3	87.8	11	64/km^{2} (167/sq mi)	10
170	Texcatepec	10,824	16	195.2	75.4	13	55/km^{2} (144/sq mi)	13
180	Tlachichilco	10,900	15	225.7	87.1	12	48/km^{2} (125/sq mi)	14
189	Tuxpan	154,600	1	964.3	372.3	2	160/km^{2} (415/sq mi)	2
198	Zacualpan	6,788	17	263.7	101.8	8	26/km^{2} (67/sq mi)	18
202	Zontecomatlán de López y Fuentes	14,644	9	242.1	93.5	9	60/km^{2} (157/sq mi)	11
	Huasteca Baja Region	563,486	—	7,080	2,733.60	—	80/km^{2} (206/sq mi)	—
Source: INEGI

=== Largest cities ===
Largest cities or towns in Huasteca Baja Region Source:
Rank		Municipality	Pop.
1	Tuxpan de Rodríguez Cano	Tuxpan	89,557
2	Álamo	Álamo Temapache	26,236
3	Cerro Azul	Cerro Azul	21,318
4	Alto Lucero	Tuxpan	20,380
5	Santiago de la Peña	Tuxpan	8,178
6	Huayacocotla	Huayacocotla	6,133
7	Tepetzintla	Tepetzintla	5,597
8	Citlaltépetl	Citlaltépetl	5,070
9	Chicontepec de Tejeda	Chicontepec	4,823
10	Castillo de Teayo	Castillo de Teayo	4,716
