= Tropical Storm Bret (2005) =

Atlantic tropical storm

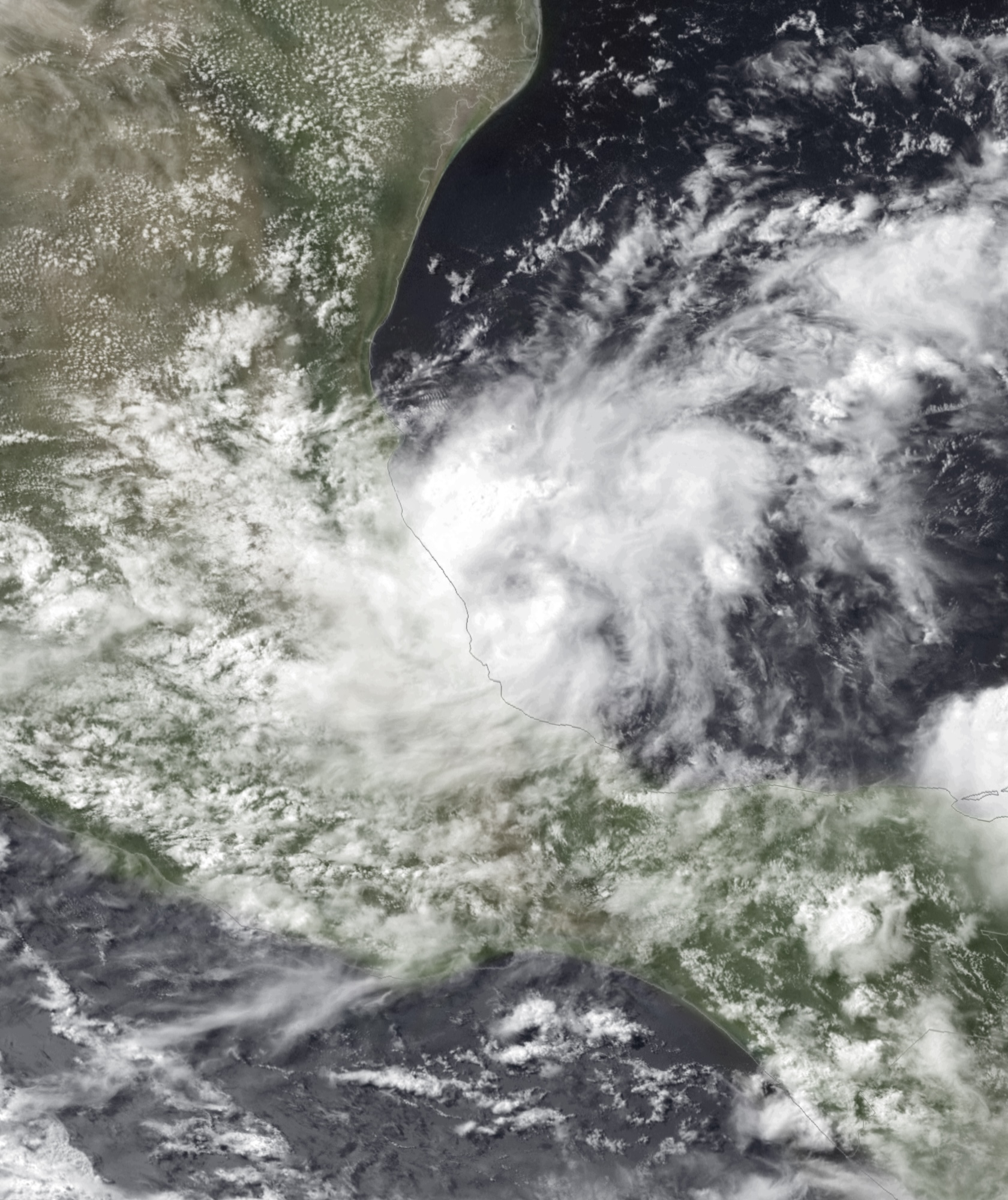
- Tropical Storm Bret at peak intensity, approaching Veracruz on 28 June

Meteorological history
- Formed: 28 June 2005
- Dissipated: 30 June 2005

Tropical storm
- 1-minute sustained (SSHWS/NWS)
- Highest winds: 40 mph (65 km/h)
- Lowest pressure: 1002 mbar (hPa); 29.59 inHg

Overall effects
- Fatalities: 3
- Damage: $9.3 million (2005 USD)
- Areas affected: Veracruz, San Luis Potosí, and Tamaulipas
- IBTrACS
- Part of the 2005 Atlantic hurricane season

Tropical Storm Bret was a short-lived tropical cyclone in June 2005 that had damaging effects in Veracruz, Mexico. The second named storm of the season, Bret quickly developed from a tropical wave on 28 June in the Bay of Campeche. Failing to intensify beyond minimal tropical storm intensity, the system made landfall in Veracruz the following day. It rapidly weakened once onshore, dissipating early on June 30. The storm brought heavy rainfall to Veracruz, San Luis Potosí, and Tamaulipas with the former suffering the brunt of the impacts. Approximately 11,000 people were adversely affected by widespread flooding. A total of 2,129 homes were damaged and 25 were destroyed, mostly in the city of Naranjos. Three people were killed in storm-related incidents and total losses exceeded 100 million pesos (US$9.3 million). The Government of Veracruz declared emergencies for nine municipalities and released tens of millions of pesos in relief aid in conjunction with national agencies.

== Meteorological history ==
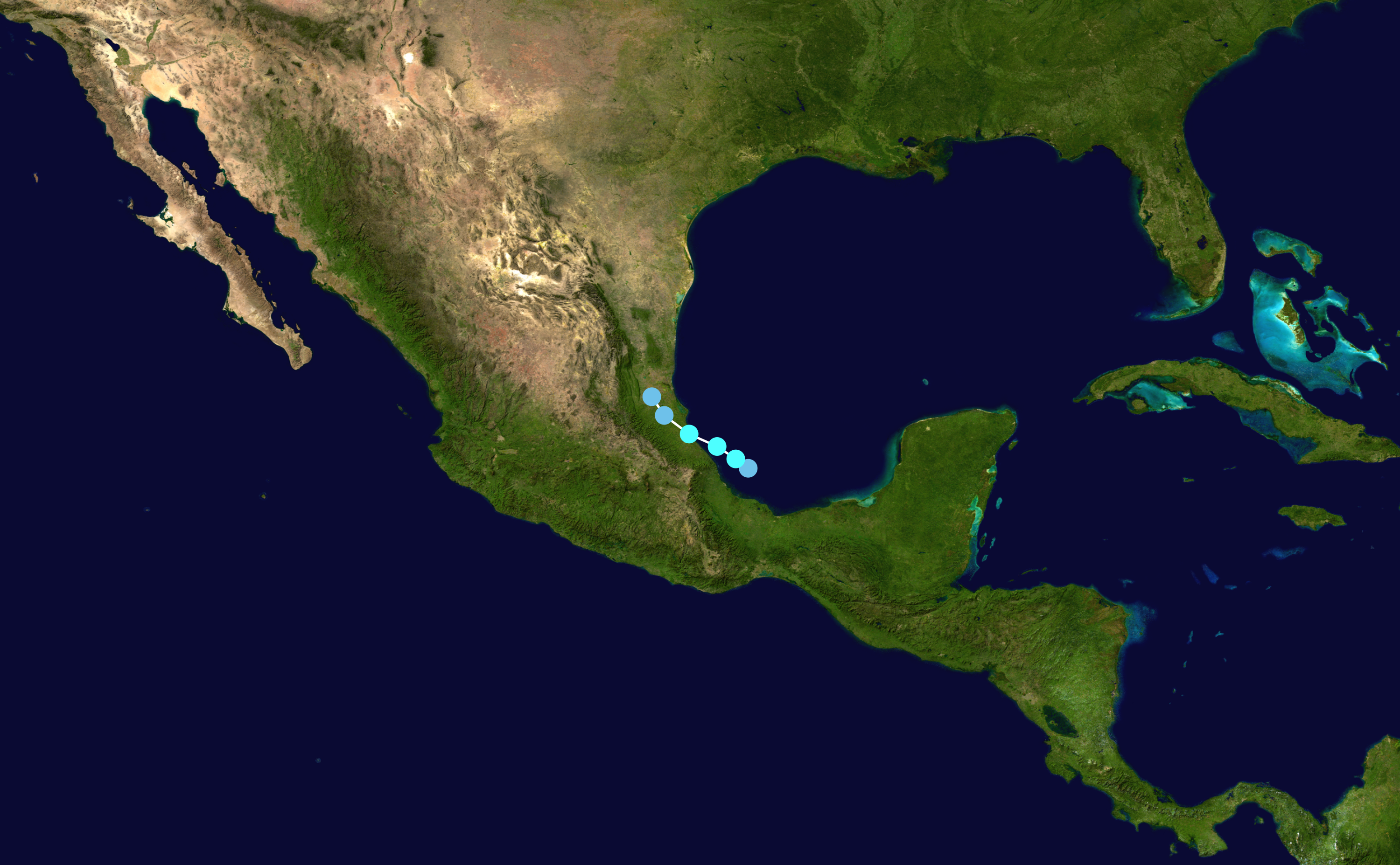
Map plotting the storm's track and intensity, according to the Saffir–Simpson scale Map key Saffir–Simpson scale Tropical depression (≤38 mph, ≤62 km/h) Tropical storm (39–73 mph, 63–118 km/h) Category 1 (74–95 mph, 119–153 km/h) Category 2 (96–110 mph, 154–177 km/h) Category 3 (111–129 mph, 178–208 km/h) Category 4 (130–156 mph, 209–251 km/h) Category 5 (≥157 mph, ≥252 km/h) Unknown Storm type Tropical cyclone Subtropical cyclone Extratropical cyclone, remnant low, tropical disturbance, or monsoon depression

A tropical wave accompanied by a weak surface low-pressure area crossed Central America and eastern Mexico from 24 June through 27 June. The system emerged over the Bay of Campeche early on 28 June, with associated convective activity increasing. Unfavorable upper-level wind shear and land interaction was expected to inhibit significant development as the system moved west-northwest. However, environmental conditions soon became more favorable and the disturbance developed more organized convection and banding features. Based on data from hurricane hunters, the system coalesced into a tropical depression with a small, well-defined center by 18:00 UTC while located about 100 km (62 mi) northeast of the city of Veracruz. A mid-level ridge to the north steered the depression west-northwest, a motion which it largely maintained through its dissipation. Soon after its formation, the cyclone strengthened into a tropical storm and was assigned the name Bret by the National Hurricane Center (NHC). The system reached its peak intensity around 22:35 UTC with maximum sustained winds of 40 mph (64 km/h) and a minimum pressure of 1,002 mbar (1,002 hPa; 29.6 inHg). Forecasters at the NHC noted that the system's small size could lead to abrupt fluctuations in strength and organization.

After its initial quick formation, convection waxed and waned throughout June 29 and the NHC assessed no change in strength as the storm approached land. Shortly before landfall, imagery from NASA's Tropical Rainfall Measuring Mission depicted the storm's structure improving and the system may have intensified as it moved ashore. Regardless, Bret made landfall around 12:00 UTC just to the south-southeast of Tuxpan, Veracruz. Soon after moving over land Bret degraded into a tropical depression. For several hours, the cyclone maintained a well-organized structure with deep convection at its core. The mountainous terrain of Mexico subsequently took its toll on Bret, leading to its surface center decoupling from the convection aloft. The former turned northwest while the later continued west-northwest over central Mexico. Bret ultimately dissipated as a tropical cyclone by 06:00 UTC on June 30.

== Preparations and impact ==
Upon the operational classification of Tropical Depression Two at 22:00 UTC on June 28, the Government of Mexico issued a tropical storm warning for areas between the city of Veracruz and Tampico. This was rescinded less than 24-hours later as the storm moved inland and dissipated. Red alerts for rain were issued in 72 of Veracruz's 212 municipalities. In Tampico, alerts were issued over the threat of heavy rain.

Tropical Storm Bret produced heavy rainfall along its path, with a peak 24‑hour rainfall total of 266 mm (10.47 in) recorded in El Raudal, Veracruz; several other locations reported over 4 inches (100 mm) of precipitation. Heavy rains extended into the neighboring states of San Luis Potosí and Tamaulipas. Landslides from the flooding cut communications and left 66 villages temporarily isolated. The rainfall caused widespread flooding in Veracruz, especially in the city of Naranjos where the Tancochín River overflowed and inundated portions of the city with 2 m (6.6 ft) of water. Approximately 1,600 homes were damaged or destroyed in Naranjos, affecting 6,000 people. Roughly 3,000 people required rescue in the city. Two vehicles were swept away in the torrent, leading to the death of one person. In Papantla, the Tlahuanapa bridge collapsed severing access to Agua Dulce. Approximately 700 people from 20 communities in Cazones de Herrera were rendered homeless. Extensive damage occurred in and around Santiago Tuxtla, with 20 bridges damaged and 200 km (120 mi) of dirt roads destroyed. Approximately 1,500 hectares (3,700 acres) of crops were damaged or destroyed and many heads of cattle were lost in Santiago Tuxtla.

Overall, 22 municipalities reported damage during the passage of Bret across Veracruz with 14 requesting emergency declarations. Nine municipalities were declared disaster areas on July 13 by the state government. Effects were greatest in Benito Juárez, Chinampa de Gorostiza, Naranjos, Tamalín, Tamiahua, Tantima, Tempoal. On July 2, the Secretariat of Health issued a health emergency over the possibility of a post-storm disease outbreak in Cerro Azul, Chinampa de Gorostiza, Naranjos, and Tuxpan. Approximately 7,500 families (11,000 people) were directly affected by the storm, of whom 3,600 required evacuation. A total of 2,129 homes were damaged and 25 were destroyed, with total losses from Bret exceeding 100 million pesos (US$9.3 million). Bret killed three people in Mexico: one each in Naranjos and Cerro Azul while the third was unspecified. Shortly after the passage of the storm, the government of Veracruz opened 6,000 emergency storm shelters for impacted citizens. The Mexican Army, combined with the efforts of police officers and state officials, worked with amphibious vehicles to rescue families in flooded houses, of whom many waited on rooftops. One million pesos (US$93,000) was provided to Santiago Tuxtla to repair road infrastructure. In the two months following Bret, three more tropical cyclones impacted Veracruz and caused further damage: Emily, Gert, and Jose.

After initially promising tens of millions of pesos in relief funds, the National Fund for Natural Disasters (Fonden) lagged behind on distributions. By November, more than four months after the storm, President Vicente Fox's government was accused of stealing these funds as none had been distributed. A meeting was held on November 8 to discuss the accusations and Fonden director Carlos Bayo stated that 45 million pesos were deposited in a Banobras trust on September 22. On November 11, the Governor of Veracruz clarified that funds were delayed after the successive impacts of multiple hurricanes after Bret and 25 million pesos were provided on November 9. Nearly 220 million pesos were provided to Fonden following Hurricane Stan in October for relief and reconstruction.

== See also ==
- Other storms named Bret
- List of Mexico hurricanes
