= Huasteca Nahuatl =

Dialect of Nahuatl

- Nawatlajtoli (Eastern)
- Native to: Mexico
- Region: La Huasteca (San Luis Potosí, Hidalgo, Puebla, Veracruz)
- Native speakers: (Eastern: 410,000 cited 1991); Central: 200,000 (2000); Western: 400,000 (1991)
- Language family: Uto-Aztecan: Aztecan (Nahuan); Nahuatl; Huasteca Nahuatl
- Writing system: Latin

Language codes
- ISO 639-3: Variously: nhe – Eastern (Veracruz) nch – Central nhw – Western (Tamazunchale)
- Glottolog: huas1257
- ELP: Western Huasteca Nahuatl

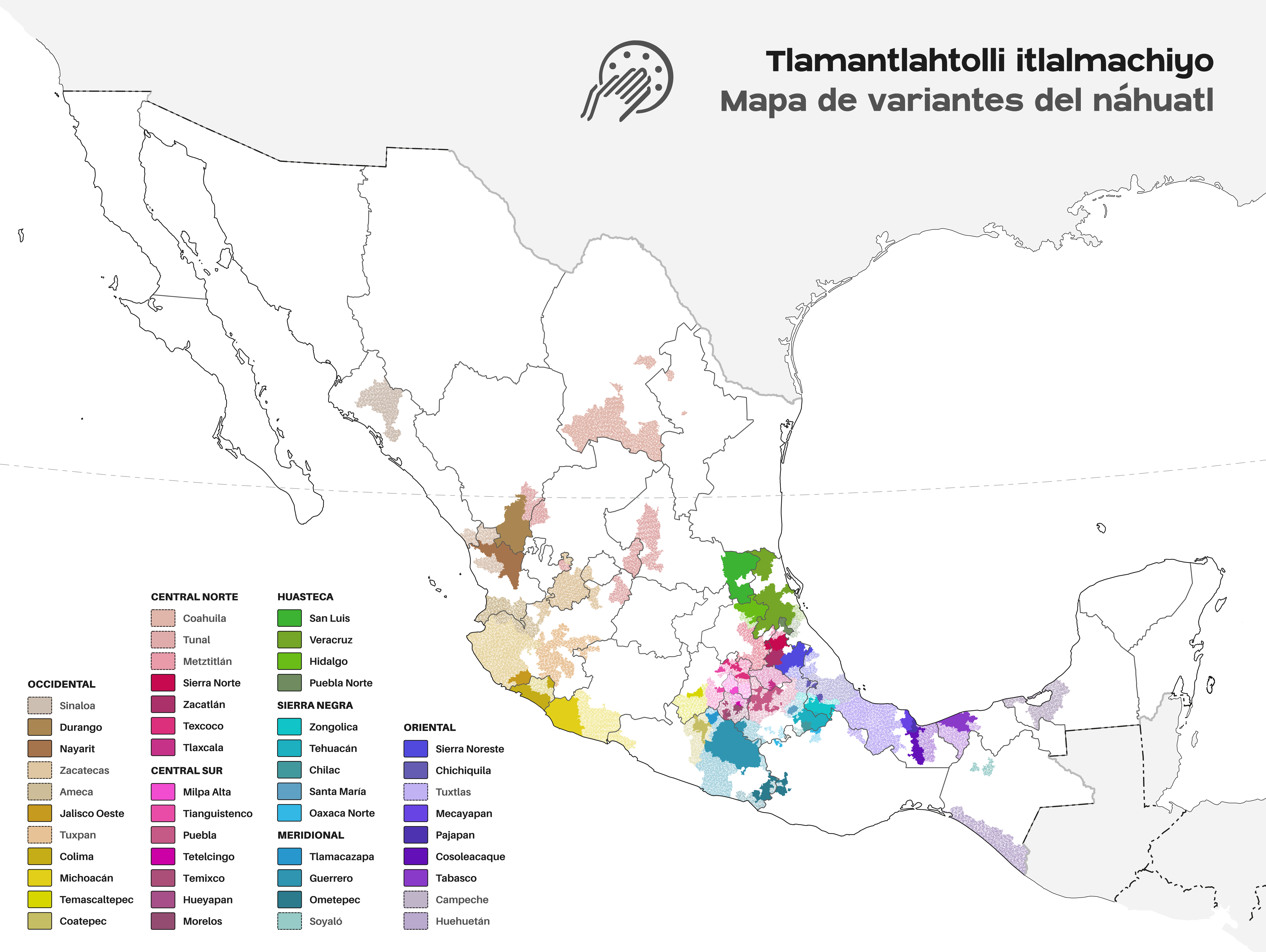
Map of the Nahuatl dialects in Mexico

Huasteca Nahuatl is a Nahuan language spoken by over a million people in the region of La Huasteca in Mexico, centered in the states of Hidalgo, Veracruz (Eastern) and San Luis Potosí (Western).

Ethnologue divides Huasteca Nahuatl into three languages: Eastern, Central, and Western, as they judge that separate literature is required, but notes that there is 85% mutual intelligibility between Eastern and Western. However, the variety used differs by state and even by community.

The indigenous radio station XEANT-AM in Tancanhuitz de Santos, San Luis Potosí, broadcasts in Huasteca Nahuatl.

== Demographics ==
Huasteca Nahuatl is spoken in the following municipalities in the states of Hidalgo, Veracruz, and San Luis Potosí.

Hidalgo (121,818 speakers)

- Huejutla de Reyes (56,377 speakers)
- Huautla (18,444 speakers)
- Yahualica (14,584 speakers)
- Xochiatipan (12,990 speakers)
- Atlapexco (12,445 speakers)
- Jaltocan (6,978 speakers)

Veracruz (98,162 speakers)

- Chicontepec (41,678 speakers)
- Ixhuatlán de Madero (21,682 speakers)
- Benito Juárez (11,793 speakers)
- Ilamatlán (9,689 speakers)
- Ixcatepec (6,949 speakers)
- Zontecomatlán (6,371 speakers)

San Luis Potosí (108,471 speakers)

- Tamazunchale (35,773 speakers)
- Axtla de Terrazas (17,401 speakers)
- Xilitla (16,646 speakers)
- Matlapa (16,286 speakers)
- Coxcatlán (12,300 speakers)
- Chalchicuautla (10,065 speakers)

== Phonology ==
The following description is that of Eastern Huasteca.

=== Vowels ===
Huasteca Nahuatl vowels
	Front		Central		Back	
	short	long	short	long	short	long
Close	i	iː			o ~ u	oː ~ uː
Mid	e	eː			o ~ u	oː ~ uː
Open			a	aː		

=== Consonants ===
Huasteca Nahuatl consonants
		Labial	Dental/Alveolar		Palatal	Velar		Glottal
		Labial	median	lateral	Palatal	plain	labial	Glottal
Nasal		m	n					
Plosive	voiceless	p	t			k	kʷ	ʔ
Plosive	voiced	(b)	(d̪)			(g)		
Affricate			ts	tɬ	tʃ			
Fricative		(f)	s		ʃ			h
Sonorant			(ɾ) (r)	l	j		w	

- Sounds in parentheses are loans from Spanish and have a limited distribution.

== Orthography ==
Huasteca Nahuatl currently has several proposed orthographies, most prominent among them those of the Instituto de Docencia e Investigación Etnológica de Zacatecas (IDIEZ), Mexican government publications, and the Summer Institute of Linguistics (SIL).

IDIEZ

- Their orthography is essentially the same as the ACK (Andrews, Campbell, Kartunnen) orthographic norm, which is heavily influenced by the de facto orthographies in colonial Nahuatl texts. It is somewhat of a deep orthography based on morphology since it aims to provide a unified system across regions.
- uses ⟨ca⟩, ⟨que⟩, ⟨qui⟩, ⟨co⟩ for /k/
- takes morphology into account
- uses ⟨za⟩, ⟨ce⟩, ⟨ci⟩, ⟨zo⟩ for /s/
- uses ⟨h⟩ for /h/
- uses ⟨hu⟩ and ⟨cu⟩ for /w/ and /kw/, respectively.

Mexican government's Secretary of Public Education (SEP) orthography

- Aims to provide easy literacy across regions but with a different writing system in each one.
- uses ⟨k⟩ for /k/
- does not take morphology into account
- uses ⟨s⟩ for /s/
- uses ⟨j⟩ for /h/
- uses ⟨u⟩ for /w/

Mexican government's National Institute of Indigenous Languages (INALI)

- uses ⟨k⟩ for /k/
- does not take morphology into account
- uses ⟨s⟩ for /s/
- uses ⟨h⟩ for /h/
- uses ⟨w⟩ for /w/

SIL

- Somewhat based on modern Spanish conventions, mostly surface-based orthography as well but does not completely dispose of Classical Nahuatl conventions.
- uses ⟨ca⟩, ⟨que⟩, ⟨qui⟩, ⟨co⟩ for /k/
- does not take morphology into account
- uses ⟨s⟩ for /s/
- uses ⟨j⟩ for /h/

Sample text: 'a book about my location.'

- IDIEZ: ce tlahcuilolli tlen campa niitztoc.
- SEP: se tlajkuiloli tlej kampa niitstok
- INALI: se tlahkwiloli tleh kampa niitstok
- SIL: se tlajcuiloli tlej campa niitztoc
