= Huayacocotla (municipality) =

- Municipality
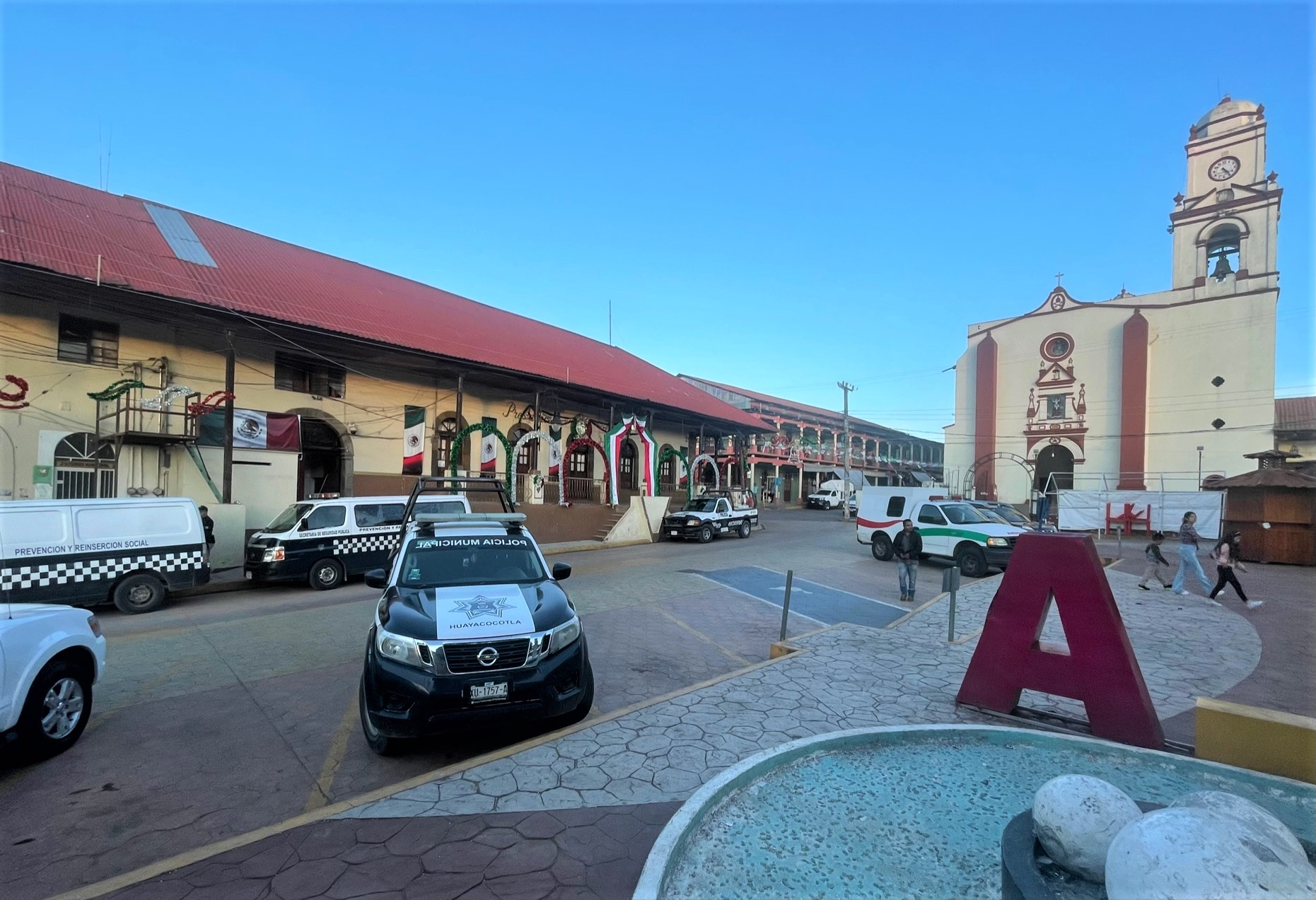

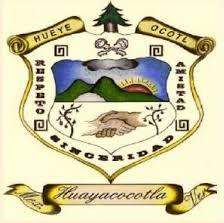
- Coat of arms

- Location within Veracruz Location within Mexico
- Coordinates: 20°32′0″N 98°29′0″W
- Country: Mexico
- State: Veracruz
- Seat: Huayacocotla

Government
  - Municipal President: Mario Jorge Pérez Martínez (AFV), 2008-10
  - Federal electoral district: Veracruz's 2nd

Area
  - Total: 571.79 km^{2} (220.77 sq mi)
- Elevation: 2,149 m (7,051 ft)

Population (2010)
  - Total: 20,765
  - Density: 36.316/km^{2} (94.057/sq mi)
- Time zone: UTC-6 (Zona Centro)
- Website: www.huayacocotla.gob.mx

Huayacocotla is a municipalitity of the Mexican state of Veracruz. It is located in the state's Huasteca Baja region. The municipal seat is the town of Huayacocotla.

In the 2005 INEGI Census, the municipality reported a total population of 20,765, of whom 5,211 lived in the municipal seat. Of the municipality's inhabitants, 779 (4.30%) spoke an indigenous language, primarily Nahuatl.

Huayacocotla Municipality covers a total surface area of 571.79 km². It borders Ilamatlán and Zontecomatlán de López y Fuentes to the north; Texcatepec and Zacualpan to the east; and with the state of Hidalgo to the south and west.

== Settlements ==
- Huayacocotla (municipal seat; 2005 population: 1069)
- Palo Bendito (879)
- Carbonero Jacales (846)
- Zonzonapa (775)
- Texilmapa (678)
