= Huasteca Alta Region =

- Region

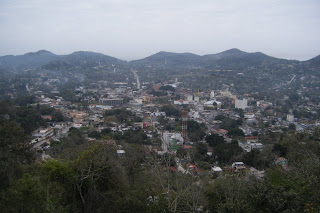
- Country: Mexico
- State: Veracruz
- Largest city: Tantoyuca

Population (2020)
  - Total: 455,493
- Time zone: UTC−6 (CST)

The Huasteca Alta region is one of the regions of the Mexican state of Veracruz. It is part of the broader Huasteca region that comprises parts of the states of Tamaulipas, Veracruz, Puebla, Hidalgo, San Luis Potosí, Querétaro and Guanajuato.

== Municipalities ==
México | Veracruz | Municipalities

1) Pánuco
2) El Higo
3) Pueblo Viejo
4) Tampico Alto
5) Tempoal
6) Ozuluama de Mascareñas
7) Chiconamel
8) Platón Sánchez
9) Chalma
10) Tantoyuca
11) Tantima
12) Tamalín
13) Chinampa de Gorostiza
14) Naranjos Amatlán
15) Tamiahua

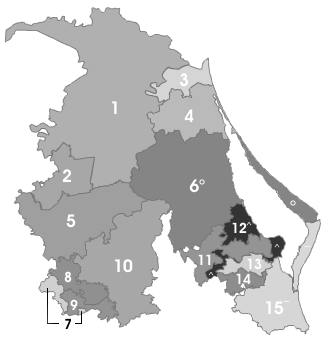

Municipality code	Name	Population		Land Area			Population density	
Municipality code	Name	2020	Rank	km^{2}	sq mi	Rank	2020	Rank
055	Chalma	13,527	11	151.7	58.6	12	89/km^{2} (231/sq mi)	4
056	Chiconamel	6,610	15	92.7	35.8	15	71/km^{2} (185/sq mi)	7
060	Chinampa de Gorostiza	16,283	10	140.2	54.1	13	116/km^{2} (301/sq mi)	3
205	El Higo	19,402	8	391.1	151.0	8	50/km^{2} (128/sq mi)	8
045	Naranjos Amatlán	26,843	5	136	53	14	197/km^{2} (511/sq mi)	2
121	Ozuluama de Mascareñas	22,756	6	2,391.6	923.4	2	10/km^{2} (25/sq mi)	15
123	Pánuco	96,185	2	3,168.1	1,223.2	1	30/km^{2} (79/sq mi)	10
129	Pláton Sánchez	18,053	9	244.8	94.5	11	74/km^{2} (74/km^{2})	6
133	Pueblo Viejo	57,909	3	288.7	111.5	10	201/km^{2} (520/sq mi)	1
150	Tamalín	11,631	13	400	150	7	29/km^{2} (75/sq mi)	12
151	Tamiahua	21,902	7	1,018.1	393.1	5	22/km^{2} (56/sq mi)	13
152	Tampico Alto	11,561	14	874.8	337.8	6	13/km^{2} (34/sq mi)	14
154	Tantima	11,991	12	333.6	128.8	9	36/km^{2} (93/sq mi)	9
155	Tantoyuca	99,959	1	1,302.3	502.8	3	77/km^{2} (199/sq mi)	5
161	Tempoal	34,408	4	1,152.4	444.9	4	30/km^{2} (77/sq mi)	11
	Huasteca Alta Region	455,493	—	10,477.02	4,666.47	—	38/km^{2} (98/sq mi)	—
Source: INEGI

=== Largest cities ===
Largest cities or towns in Huasteca Alta Region Source:
Rank		Municipality	Pop.
1	Pánuco	Pánuco	41,588
2	Tantoyuca	Tantoyuca	33,226
3	Naranjos	Naranjos Amatlán	19,272
4	Benito Juárez	Pueblo Viejo	15,597
5	Anáhuac	Pueblo Viejo	14,391
6	Tempoal de Sánchez	Tempoal	12,494
7	Platón Sánchez	Platón Sánchez	11,233
8	El Moralillo	Pánuco	10,737
9	Ciudad Cuauhtémoc	Pueblo Viejo	9,633
10	El Higo	El Higo	8,913
