= Eduardo Leines Barrera =

Mexican politician (born 1956)

- Born: 16 March 1956 (age 70); Huayacocotla, Veracruz, Mexico
- Education: UNAM
- Occupation: Politician
- Political party: PRI

Eduardo Abraham Leines Barrera (born 16 March 1956) is a Mexican politician from the Institutional Revolutionary Party (PRI).

In the 2000 general election he was elected to the Chamber of Deputies to represent the second district of Veracruz during the 58th Congress. He had previously served as municipal president of Huayacocotla, Veracruz, in 1992–1994.
