= XEYTM-AM =

Community radio station in Teocelo, Veracruz, Mexico

XHSCMK-FM/XEYTM-AM
- Teocelo, Veracruz; Mexico
- Frequencies: 106.5 FM; 1490 AM
- Branding: Radio Teocelo

Programming
- Format: Community radio

Ownership
- Owner: Asociación Veracruzana de Comunicadores Populares, A.C.

History
- First air date: 1965
- Former call signs: XEYT-AM

Technical information
- Licensing authority: CRT
- Class: A (FM); C (AM)
- Power: 1 kW
- ERP: 3 kW
- HAAT: -47.00 m
- Transmitter coordinates: 19.380368°N 96.9787717°W

Links
- Webcast: Listen live
- Website: radioteocelo.mx

XHSCMK-FM and XEYTM-AM (106.5 FM and 1490 AM, "Radio Teocelo") is a radio station in Teocelo, Veracruz, Mexico. Formerly known as XEYT-AM, the station is Mexico's oldest community radio station, a title it shares with XHFCE-FM in Huayacocotla.

== History ==
The history of XEYT/XEYTM is the longest of any community radio station in Mexico. The permit was issued to the Centro de Promoción Social y Cultural, A.C. in 1965, and the station signed on with a power of 250 watts. Ceprososc held the station's permit until 1998.

The station was small, with irregular transmissions of two to four hours a day and a narrow coverage area. By the late 1970s, the SCT was threatening to revoke XEYT's permit, which forced the station to seek support for its modernization. In 1980, Radio Teocelo signed an agreement with Fomento Cultural y Educativo, owners of what was then known as XEJN-OC, and underwent a series of significant upgrades in the decade that followed. The station's power was raised to one kilowatt, extending coverage to new areas; the station became known as "Radio Cultural Campesina"; and XEYT moved to a new studio and transmitter facility. In 1998, Asociación Veracruzana de Comunicadores Populares, A.C. (Avercop) was formed to manage the station.

It was the only citizen-owned radio station in Mexico from 1966 to 2005, when the Mexican government issued a series of permits to community radio stations.

The current permit for the station was issued in 2013 and resulted in the callsign change to XEYTM-AM. The station also has offspring projects in television (Teocelo Te Ve) and a newspaper, Alta Voz. The station faces issues related to raising funds needed for the digitalization of the station.

On April 29, 2016, the Federal Telecommunications Institute (IFT) accredited Radio Teocelo as the second legally recognized community radio station in Mexico, transferring its permit to a social-community concession.
