= Citlaltépetl, Veracruz =

Citlaltépetl
- Municipality
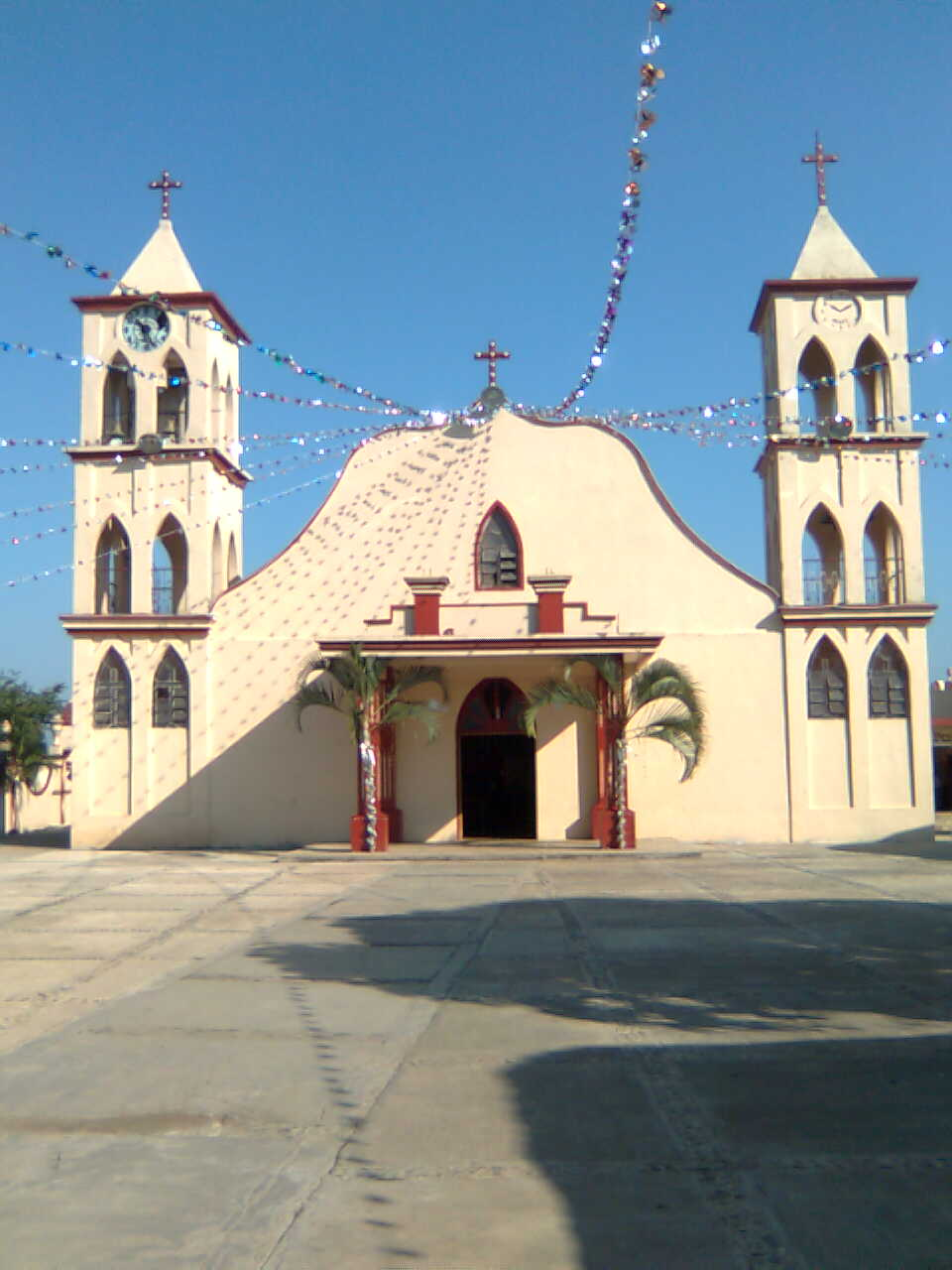
- Church of St. Nicholas of Tolentino in Citlaltépec, the municipal seat

- Location in Veracruz

- Location in Mexico
- Coordinates: 21°19′47″N 97°52′44″W
- Country: Mexico
- State: Veracruz
- Established: 12 June 1872
- Seat: Citlaltépec

Government
  - President: Eutiquia Reyes Santiago
  - Federal electoral district: Veracruz's 1st

Area
  - Total: 81.539 km^{2} (31.482 sq mi)
- Elevation (of seat): 222 m (728 ft)

Population (2010 Census)
  - Total: 11,081
  - Estimate (2015 Intercensal Survey): 12,109
  - Density: 135.90/km^{2} (351.97/sq mi)
  - Seat: 5,005
- Time zone: UTC-6 (Zona Centro)
- Postal codes: 92230–92268
- Area code: 785
- Website: Official website

Citlaltépetl (Nahuatl: "star mountain") is a municipality in the Mexican state of Veracruz, located 223 kilometres (139 mi) northwest of the state capital of Xalapa and 99 kilometres (62 mi) south of the city of Tampico, Tamaulipas.

== Geography ==
The municipality of Citlaltépetl is located in central Veracruz at an altitude between 80 and 1,300 metres (260–4,270 ft), with the south being higher in elevation. It borders the municipalities of Ozuluama to the northwest, Tantima to the northeast and east, Tancoco to the southeast, and Chontla to the west. The municipality covers an area of 81.539 square kilometres (31.482 sq mi) and comprises 0.1% of the state's area.

The majority of the land in Citlaltépetl (65.55%) is pastureland. The dominant soils in the municipality are vertisols and regosols.

Citlaltépetl's climate is warm with rain falling mostly in the summer. Average temperatures in the municipality range between 21 and 25 °C (70–77 °F), and average annual precipitation ranges between 1,400 and 1,600 millimetres (55–63 in).

Climate data for Citlaltepetl weather station at 21°19′45″N 97°52′39″W, 220 m above sea level (1981–2010 averages, 1951–2010 extremes)
Month	Jan	Feb	Mar	Apr	May	Jun	Jul	Aug	Sep	Oct	Nov	Dec	Year
Record high °C (°F)	40.5 (104.9)	36.5 (97.7)	42.5 (108.5)	45.0 (113.0)	45.5 (113.9)	39.5 (103.1)	39.0 (102.2)	39.0 (102.2)	37.5 (99.5)	36.5 (97.7)	33.5 (92.3)	33.5 (92.3)	45.5 (113.9)
Mean daily maximum °C (°F)	22.4 (72.3)	23.8 (74.8)	27.9 (82.2)	31.1 (88.0)	33.1 (91.6)	33.3 (91.9)	31.9 (89.4)	32.5 (90.5)	30.8 (87.4)	29.0 (84.2)	26.1 (79.0)	23.2 (73.8)	28.8 (83.8)
Daily mean °C (°F)	18.1 (64.6)	19.2 (66.6)	22.6 (72.7)	25.5 (77.9)	27.6 (81.7)	28.2 (82.8)	27.3 (81.1)	27.6 (81.7)	26.4 (79.5)	24.4 (75.9)	21.5 (70.7)	18.7 (65.7)	23.9 (75.0)
Mean daily minimum °C (°F)	13.9 (57.0)	14.6 (58.3)	17.3 (63.1)	19.9 (67.8)	22.2 (72.0)	23.1 (73.6)	22.7 (72.9)	22.7 (72.9)	21.9 (71.4)	19.9 (67.8)	16.9 (62.4)	14.2 (57.6)	19.1 (66.4)
Record low °C (°F)	3.5 (38.3)	5.0 (41.0)	7.0 (44.6)	11.0 (51.8)	11.5 (52.7)	17.5 (63.5)	19.0 (66.2)	20.0 (68.0)	16.0 (60.8)	9.0 (48.2)	8.5 (47.3)	−1.0 (30.2)	−1.0 (30.2)
Average precipitation mm (inches)	75.1 (2.96)	67.3 (2.65)	38.3 (1.51)	60.4 (2.38)	84.8 (3.34)	196.9 (7.75)	221.2 (8.71)	179.1 (7.05)	362.1 (14.26)	242.9 (9.56)	95.8 (3.77)	84.5 (3.33)	1,708.4 (67.26)
Average precipitation days (≥ 0.1 mm)	9.4	8.4	6.2	4.9	5.2	10.3	13.2	11.5	14.7	9.7	8.5	8.4	110.4
Source: Servicio Meteorológico Nacional

== History ==
In pre-Hispanic times the area was inhabited by the Huastec people, and the Mexica also kept a military presence there. Citlaltépetl was incorporated on 12 June 1872 as a municipality in the canton of Tampico in the state of Veracruz. It became a free municipality on 15 January 1918.

== Administration ==
The municipal government comprises a president, a councillor (Spanish: síndico), and a trustee (regidor). The current president of the municipality is Eutiquia Reyes Santiago.

== Demographics ==
In the 2010 Mexican Census, the municipality of Citlaltépetl recorded a population of 11,081 inhabitants living in 2771 households. The 2015 Intercensal Survey estimated a population of 12,109 inhabitants in Citlaltépetl, 81.85% of whom reported being of Indigenous ancestry and 4.29% reported being of African ancestry. In the 2010 Census, 1955 people or 18% of the population in Citlaltépetl reported speaking an Indigenous language, of which 1887 spoke Nahuatl.

There are 30 localities in the municipality, of which only the municipal seat Citlaltépec is classified as urban. It recorded a population of 5005 inhabitants in the 2010 Census.

== Economy ==
The main economic activity in Citlaltépetl is farming. Corn, coffee and oranges are the main crops grown, and cattle and pigs are raised.
