= María del Carmen Pinete Vargas =

Mexican politician (1960–2025)

- Born: 29 August 1960; Tantoyuca, Veracruz, Mexico
- Died: 1 April 2025 (aged 64)
- Other name: Maru Pinete
- Education: Master's degree in public administration
- Occupation: Politician
- Office: Deputy for the 1st district of Veracruz
- Political party: Ecologist Green Party of Mexico; Institutional Revolutionary Party

María del Carmen Pinete Vargas (Note: In this Mexican name, the surname is Pinete and the second or maternal family name is Vargas.) (29 August 1960 – 1 April 2025), also known as Maru Pinete, was a Mexican politician. Originally affiliated with the Institutional Revolutionary Party (PRI), she later joined the Ecologist Green Party of Mexico (PVEM). She was elected to the Chamber of Deputies on four occasions.

== Life and career ==
Pinete joined the PRI in 1975 and pursued a career as an elementary school teacher, beginning her teaching career in 1978 and being certified as an elementary school professor in 1982 by the Instituto de Regularización Pedagógica in Xalapa. She joined the Sindicato Nacional de Trabajadores de la Educación in 1980, and she pursued careers in the SNTE as well as in her hometown of Tantoyuca. She presided over the Desarrollo Integral de la Familia in Tantoyuca from 1985 to 1988.

The early- and mid-1990s were a time of intense political activity for Pinete in the SNTE, PRI and local government. In 1991, she began a two-year term as the general secretary of the local SNTE delegation; the next year, she became a national councilor in the SNTE and began a term as the alternate municipal president of Tantoyuca. In 1994, she left her last SNTE post and served briefly in the Veracruz state PRI as the coordinator of social management. The next year, she was elected municipal president of Tantoyuca, serving in that capacity until 1997; during this time, she also became a state-level PRI political councilor for the first time.

After the end of her term as municipal president, Pinete continued to serve in the state government and the PRI. She served as a coordinator in the PRI's Women's Alliance and Confederación Nacional de Organizaciones Populares. In 1999, she was named as a delegate from the National Institute for Adult Education (INEA) in Veracruz; she oversaw the federalization of the INEA and was the first director general of the resulting new agency, the Veracruz Institute for Adult Education (IVEA), from 2000 to 2004. Additionally, in 2001, she obtained her master's degree in public administration. She left the IVEA in 2004 to become the state subsecretary of political development; she taught for the final time in 2005.

In 2006, voters in Veracruz's 2nd district sent Pinete to the Chamber of Deputies for the 60th Congress, her first elected office in nearly a decade. She presided over the Bicameral Commission for the Library System and the Editorial Council and was the vice president of the chamber's Board of Directors. In addition, she served on commissions dealing with Public Education and Educational Services, Attention to Vulnerable Groups, and Special for Promotion of Digital Access in Mexico. She also served as a national political councilor for the PRI between 2006 and 2009.

After a brief reappearance in PRI politics in 2012 as the first woman to be director of the Territorial Movement for the state of Veracruz, she was returned to the Chamber of Deputies for Veracruz's 2nd in 2015. In the 63rd Congress, she was a secretary on the Environment and Natural Resources Commission and served on those dealing with Rural Development and Public Education and Educational Services. Additionally, in May 2016, she was named president of a special commission for environmental efforts in states with PEMEX facilities.

She returned to Congress in the 2021 mid-terms, representing Veracruz's 2nd district for the PVEM during the 65th Congress, and, following the 2022 redistricting, she was re-elected for the 1st district in the 2024 general election. For the first year of the 66th Congress, she was elected as one of the vice presidents of the Chamber.

=== Personal life and death ===
Pinete Vargas had four children and was a grandmother. She died on 1 April 2025, at the age of 64. Her seat in Congress was taken up by her alternate, Denisse Guzmán González, on 9 April.

== Electoral history ==
Election	Body	Position	Party
1995 state election	Municipality of Tantoyuca, Ver.	Municipal president	Institutional Revolutionary Party
2006 general election	60th Congress	Deputy for Veracruz's 2nd	Institutional Revolutionary Party
2015 mid-terms	63rd Congress	Deputy for Veracruz's 2nd	Institutional Revolutionary Party
2021 mid-terms	65th Congress	Deputy for Veracruz's 2nd	Ecologist Green Party of Mexico
2024 general election	66th Congress	Deputy for Veracruz's 1st	
