= Norberta Díaz Azuara =

Mexican politician

- Born: 6 June 1948 (age 77); Tantoyuca, Veracruz, Mexico
- Occupation: Politician
- Political party: PRI

Norberta Adalmira Díaz Azuara (born 6 June 1948) is a Mexican politician from the Institutional Revolutionary Party (PRI). In 2012 she served as a deputy in the 61st Congress, representing Veracruz's 2nd district as the alternate of Genaro Mejía de la Merced.
