= Cabo Rojo (Mexico) =

Coordinates: 21°47′N 97°35′W

Cabo Rojo (Spanish for "Red Cape") (21°47'N 97°35'W) is a barrier of quartzite sand deposited adjacent to the coast of the Mexican state of Veracruz, about 55 km (34 mi) south of the city of Tampico, Tamaulipas. It encloses the brackish lagoon called Laguna de Tamiahua. It is located in the municipalities of Ozuluama de Mascareñas and Tamiahua.

As one of the few protruding features on this part of the coast, it may be regarded as the boundary between the western coasts of the Bay of Campeche and the Gulf of Mexico proper, and is frequently used by the authorities as a breakpoint for tropical cyclone warnings and watches.
