= Leopoldo Sánchez =

Leopoldo Sánchez may refer to:

- Leopold Sánchez (1948–2021), Spanish comic book artist
- Leopoldo Sánchez Celis (1916–1989), Mexican politician, governor of Sinaloa
- Leopoldo Sánchez Cruz (born 1971), Mexican politician
