= Ixhuatlán de Madero =

- Municipality
- Location within Veracruz Location within Mexico
- Coordinates: 20°41′N 98°01′W
- Country: Mexico
- State: Veracruz

Government
  - Municipal President: Elías Benítez Hernández
  - Federal electoral district: Veracruz's 2nd

Area
  - Total: 598.8 km^{2} (231.2 sq mi)
- Elevation: 260 m (850 ft)

Population
  - Total: 48 609
  - Density: 81.18/km^{2} (210.3/sq mi)
- Time zone: UTC-6 (Zona Centro)

Ixhuatlán de Madero is a municipality in the Mexican state of Veracruz. It is located in the north zone of the state, about 376 km from the state capital Xalapa, in the region called Huasteca Baja. It is one of 212 municipalities in Veracruz. It has an area of 598.81 km^{2}. It is located at 20°41′N 98°01′W.

== Geography ==
The municipality of Ixhuatlán de Madero is bordered on the north by Chicontepec de Tejeda, on the east by Temapache, on the south by Hidalgo State and Puebla State, and on the west by Tlachichilco and Benito Juárez.

The area's climate is warm and rainy, with more rain in summer and autumn.

== Products ==
Its principal agricultural products are maize, beans, watermelon, green chile, coffee and orange fruit.

== Culture ==
The town's main celebrations occur in May (5-15) to note the Batalla de Puebla, and in July to honor to San Cristobal, the town's patron saint.
