= Naranjos Amatlán =

Municipality in the Mexican state of Veracruz

- Municipality
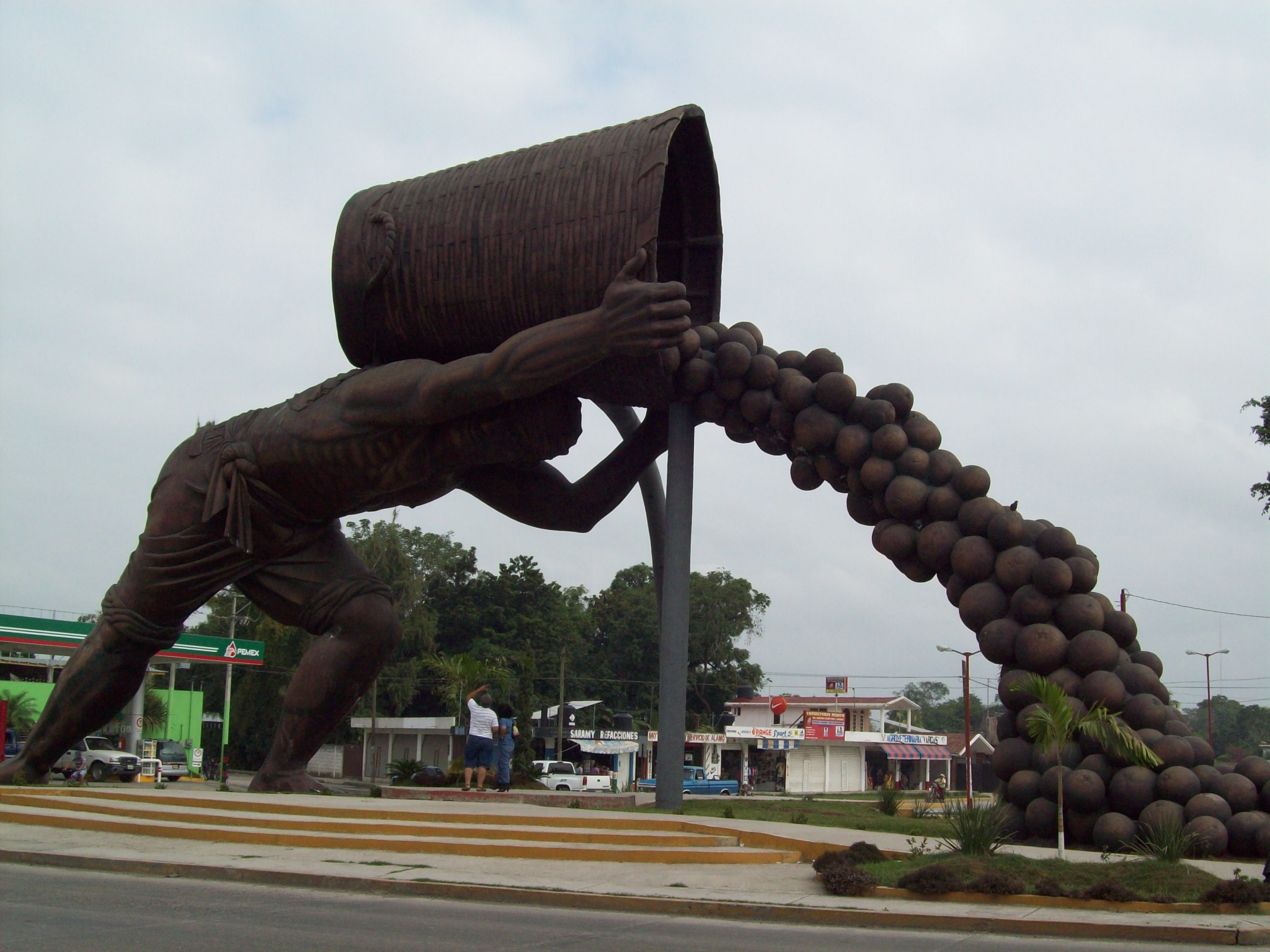
- Monument to the orange picker

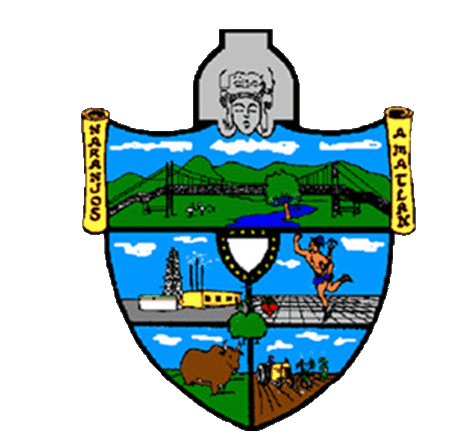
- Coat of arms

- Location in Mexico Naranjos Amatlán (Mexico)
- Coordinates: 21°21′N 97°41′W
- Country: Mexico
- State: Veracruz
- Region: Huasteca Alta
- Seat: Naranjos

Government
  - Federal electoral district: Veracruz's 2nd
- Elevation: 10 m (33 ft)

Population (2020)
  - Total: 26,843
- Time zone: UTC-6 (Zona Centro)

Naranjos Amatlán is a municipality in the Mexican state of Veracruz. It is located in the north zone of the state, about 402 km from the state capital Xalapa. The municipal seat is Naranjos.

== Economy ==
It produces principally maize, beans, orange fruit, coffee and mango.

== Culture ==
In Naranjos Amatlán, in March takes place the celebration in honor to San José de la Montaña, patron of the town.

== Geography ==
The municipality has an area of 200.7 square kilometres (77.5 sq mi). It is located at 21°21′N 97°41′W.

The municipality of Naranjos Amatlán is delimited to the north by Chinampa de Gorostiza to the east and south-east by Tamiahua, to the south and south-west by Tancoco and to the west by Tamalín.

=== Climate ===
It has a hot-humid-tropical climate, most of the year is hot (from May to October) winter is usually between warm and cool. Between May and June temperatures usually get around 104 °F (40 °C), while in December and January could get lower than 41 °F (5 °C). The heat is really common, including some days in the winter. When spring is finishing (May–June) is usually very hot and dry, while in the summer is a little bit less but much rainier, fall's beginning October) is still hot, the rest is cooler, cold fronts start that are from Mexico's Gulf.

°F (°C)

January Max. 73 (23) Min. 57 (14)

February Max. 75 (24) Min. 61 (16)

March Max. 81 (27) Min. 63 (17)

April Max. 84 (29) Min. 66 (19)

May Max. 90 (32) Min. 72 (22)

June Max. 95 (35) Min. 73 (23)

July Max. 88 (31) Min. 72 (22)

August Max. 91 (33) Min. 73 (23)

September Max. 90 (32) Min. 70 (21)

October Max. 88 (31) Min. 68 (20)

November Max. 79 (26) Min. 61 (16)

December Max. 75 (24) Min. 59 (15)
