= Ozuluama =

Ozuluama (Formally: Ozuluama de Mascareñas)
- City & municipal seat
- Location within Veracruz Location within Mexico
- Coordinates: 21°40′0″N 97°51′0″W
- Country: Mexico
- State: Veracruz
- Municipality: Ozuluama de Mascareñas
- City status: 6 September 1910

Government
  - Federal electoral district: Veracruz's 1st
- Elevation: 150 m (490 ft)

Population (2005)
  - Total: 3,439
- Time zone: UTC-6 (Zona Centro)
- Demonym: Ozuluamense

Ozuluama (formally: Ozuluama de Mascareñas) is a city in the Mexican state of Veracruz. It is located in the state's Huasteca Alta region. It serves as the municipal seat for the surrounding municipality of Ozuluama de Mascareñas. It was given city status on 6 September 1910.

In the 2005 INEGI Census, the city of Ozuluama reported a total population of 3,439

The name "Ozuluama" is Nahuatl in origin. The epithet "de Mascareñas" (awarded 20 August 1980) honours Colonel Francisco Esteban Mascareñas, who was born here and fought on the Liberal side in the Reform War.
