= Zonzonapa =

Town in Veracruz

- Interactive map of Zonzonapa
- Location of Zonzonapa within Mexico
- Country: Mexico
- State: Veracruz
- Municipality: Huayacocotla

Population (2014)
  - Total: 746

Time zone
- America/Mexico_City: UTC-6 (Zona Centro)

Zonzonapa is a town in Mexico. It is located in the municipality of Huayacocotla in the state of Veracruz, in the eastern part of the country, 160 km northeast of the capital Mexico City. Zonzonapa is located 1,339 meters above sea level (Note: Calculated from elevation data (DEM 3") from Viewfinder Panoramas.) and has a population of 746.

The terrain around Zonzonapa is varied. (Note: Calculated from the variance in all elevation data (DEM 3") from Viewfinder Panoramas, within a 10 kilometer radius.) The area around Zonzonapa is fairly sparsely populated, with 38 inhabitants per square kilometer. The nearest major community is Texcatepec, 14.0 km southeast of Zonzonapa. The surroundings around Zonzonapa are a mosaic of agricultural land and natural vegetation.
