= Tantima =

- Municipality
- Location of Tantima within Mexico Tantima (Mexico)
- Coordinates: 21°20′N 97°50′W
- Country: Mexico
- State: Veracruz

Government
  - Municipal President: Maria Guadalupe Santos Cenobio
  - Federal electoral district: Veracruz's 1st

Area
  - Total: 267.32 km^{2} (103.21 sq mi)

Population
  - Total: 13 248
  - Density: 49.56/km^{2} (128.4/sq mi)
- Time zone: UTC-6 (Zona Centro)
- Website: http://www.tantima.gob.mx/

Tantima is a municipality located in the montane central zone in the Mexican state of Veracruz, about 220 km from the state capital Xalapa. It has a surface of 267.32 km^{2}. It is located at 21°20′N 97°50′W. It is a village huasteco very ancient; the name is given of it steals of producing tree of a few fruits known also like sacuates or jícaras. Previously it was including a great extension of territory, but in 1872 Citlaltépetl's municipality is raised and in 1875 that of Tamalín, segregating both territories of Tantima's municipality.

== Toponymy ==
The word Tantima may come from the huastec or nahuatl languages: tan (place) and tima (a kind of tree).

== Geography ==
The municipality of Tantima is delimited to the north by Ozuluama, to the north, east and south by Tamalín, to the south-east by Chinampa de Gorostiza, and to the south by Tancoco. It is watered by small creeks that form Cuchapas's tideland, which ends in the Lagoon Tamiahua.

The weather in Tantima is very warm all year with rains in summer and autumn.

== Agriculture ==
It produces principally maize, beans, watermelon and orange fruit.

== Celebrations ==
In Tantima, in October takes place the celebration in honor to San Francisco de Asís. Virgen de la Candelaria, Patron of the town, and in December takes place the celebration in honor to Virgen de Guadalupe.
