= Genaro Mejía de la Merced =

Mexican politician

- Born: 22 May 1968 (age 58); Chicontepec de Tejeda, Veracruz, Mexico
- Occupation: Politician
- Political party: PRI

Genaro Mejía de la Merced (born 22 May 1968) is a Mexican politician from the Institutional Revolutionary Party (PRI).

In the 2009 mid-terms he was elected to the Chamber of Deputies to represent the second district of Veracruz during the 61st Congress.
