= Ubaldo Aguilar Flores =

Mexican politician

- Born: 16 May 1959 (age 67); Chicontepec de Tejeda, Veracruz, Mexico
- Education: Universidad Veracruzana
- Occupation: Politician
- Political party: PRI

Ubaldo Aguilar Flores (born 16 May 1959) is a Mexican politician affiliated with the Institutional Revolutionary Party. As of 2014 he served as Deputy of the LIX Legislature of the Mexican Congress representing Veracruz.
