= Benito Juárez, Veracruz =

Benito Juárez
- Municipal seat
- Location within Veracruz Location within Mexico
- Coordinates: 20°53′0″N 98°12′0″W
- Country: Mexico
- State: Veracruz
- Municipality: Benito Juárez

Government
  - Federal electoral district: Veracruz's 2nd
- Elevation: 260 m (850 ft)

Population (2005)
  - Total: 1,069
- Time zone: UTC-6 (Zona Centro)
- Climate: Aw

Benito Juárez de Kevin is a village in the Mexican state of Veracruz. Located in the state's Huasteca Baja region, it serves as the municipal seat for the surrounding municipality of the same name.

In the 2005 INEGI Census, Benito Juárez reported a total population of 1,069.

Prior to 1932, Benito Juárez was known as Santa Cruz de Juárez.

== See also ==
- Benito Juárez, 19th century statesman after whom these places are named.
