= Tepoxteco =

- Town
- Location in Mexico
- Coordinates: 20°55′55″N 98°03′35″W
- Country: Mexico
- State: Veracruz
- Municipality: Chicontepec de Tejeda

Population (2010)
  - Total: 462

Tepoxteco is a town of the municipality Chicontepec de Tejeda, in the state of Veracruz, eastern Mexico. This town has got 462 inhabitants, many people still speak the nahuatl language.
