= Pánuco, Veracruz =

Pánuco
- City & municipal seat

- Location within Veracruz Location within Mexico
- Coordinates: 22°03′0″N 98°11′0″W
- Country: Mexico
- State: Veracruz
- Region: Huasteca Alta
- Municipality: Pánuco
- Founded: 22 December 1522
- City status: 30 June 1931

Government
  - Municipal President: Oscar Guzmán de Paz
  - Federal electoral district: Veracruz's 1st
- Elevation: 10 m (33 ft)

Population (2020)
  - Total: 41,588
- Time zone: UTC-6 (Zona Centro)
- Area code: 846
- Website: www.panuco.gob.mx

Pánuco (Spanish: [ˈpanuko]) is a city in the Mexican state of Veracruz, located in the state's Huasteca Alta region. It serves as the municipal seat of the surrounding Pánuco Municipality. It stands on the banks of the Río Pánuco.

In 2020, the city reported a total population of 41,588.

== History ==
Pánuco is traditionally held to have been founded by Hernán Cortés on 22 December 1522, as Villa de Santiesteban del Puerto, the second ayuntamiento on the American continent. It was the capital of the Province of Pánuco in the early colonial period. It was given city status on 30 June 1931.

Hernando de Soto's 1541 expedition stopped in Panuco after his death.

On April 23, 1900, Pánuco was destroyed by fire, leaving more than 2,000 homeless.

== Climate ==
Climate data for Panuco (1991–2020 normals, extremes 1976–present)
Month	Jan	Feb	Mar	Apr	May	Jun	Jul	Aug	Sep	Oct	Nov	Dec	Year
Record high °C (°F)	36 (97)	39 (102)	43 (109)	46.5 (115.7)	47 (117)	42 (108)	40 (104)	42 (108)	41 (106)	40 (104)	37 (99)	36.5 (97.7)	47 (117)
Mean daily maximum °C (°F)	23.4 (74.1)	25.9 (78.6)	29.0 (84.2)	31.9 (89.4)	34.3 (93.7)	34.3 (93.7)	33.2 (91.8)	33.7 (92.7)	32.1 (89.8)	30.3 (86.5)	26.7 (80.1)	24.1 (75.4)	29.9 (85.8)
Daily mean °C (°F)	18.5 (65.3)	20.4 (68.7)	23.2 (73.8)	26.0 (78.8)	28.6 (83.5)	29.2 (84.6)	28.4 (83.1)	28.6 (83.5)	27.5 (81.5)	25.4 (77.7)	21.7 (71.1)	19.1 (66.4)	24.7 (76.5)
Mean daily minimum °C (°F)	13.6 (56.5)	15.0 (59.0)	17.4 (63.3)	20.1 (68.2)	22.9 (73.2)	24.0 (75.2)	23.6 (74.5)	23.6 (74.5)	22.9 (73.2)	20.5 (68.9)	16.6 (61.9)	14.1 (57.4)	19.5 (67.1)
Record low °C (°F)	2 (36)	0.5 (32.9)	5.5 (41.9)	7 (45)	13 (55)	15 (59)	13.5 (56.3)	20 (68)	12 (54)	9.5 (49.1)	3.5 (38.3)	−2 (28)	−2 (28)
Average precipitation mm (inches)	26.9 (1.06)	22.3 (0.88)	15.6 (0.61)	25.8 (1.02)	39.2 (1.54)	157.4 (6.20)	127.6 (5.02)	115.7 (4.56)	178.4 (7.02)	89.2 (3.51)	31.9 (1.26)	23.3 (0.92)	853.3 (33.59)
Average precipitation days	9.3	6.0	4.6	3.9	4.8	9.9	11.5	11.7	14.3	9.2	7.9	7.5	100.6
Source: Servicio Meteorológico Nacional
