= Tepetzintla, Veracruz =

Tepetzintla
- Town and municipality
- Location in Veracruz

- Location in Mexico
- Coordinates: 21°09′57″N 97°51′04″W
- Country: Mexico
- State: Veracruz
- Established: 1 December 1868
- Seat: Tepetzintla

Government
  - President: Olga Isela Gerardo Morales
  - Federal electoral district: Veracruz's 2nd

Area
  - Total: 227.942 km^{2} (88.009 sq mi)
- Elevation (of seat): 244 m (801 ft)

Population (2010 Census)
  - Total: 13,949
  - Estimate (2015 Intercensal Survey): 14,736
  - Density: 61.195/km^{2} (158.50/sq mi)
  - Seat: 2,261
- Time zone: UTC-6 (Zona Centro)
- Postal code: 92530–92539
- Area code: 785
- Website: Official website

Tepetzintla (Nahuatl: "under the hill" or "many small hills") is a municipality in the Mexican state of Veracruz, located 207 kilometres (129 mi) northwest of the state capital of Xalapa and 119 kilometres (74 mi) south of the city of Tampico.

== Geography ==
The municipality of Tepetzintla is located on the coastal plain of northern Veracruz at an altitude between 80 and 1,100 metres (260–3,610 ft). It borders the municipalities of Tancoco to the north, Cerro Azul to the northeast, Temapache to the southeast, Chicontepec to the southwest, Ixcatepec to the west, and Chontla to the northwest. The municipality covers an area of 227.942 square kilometres (88.009 sq mi) and comprises 0.3% of the state's area.

The municipality is mostly located in the Tuxpan River basin. Pastureland comprises 65% of Tepetzintla's area while jungle comprises another 28%.

Tepetzintla's climate is warm and humid with rain falling mostly in the summer. Average temperatures in the municipality range between 22 and 26 °C (72–79 °F), and average annual precipitation ranges between 1,400 and 1,600 millimetres (55–63 in).

== History ==
On 1 December 1868 Tepetzintla was incorporated as a municipality in the canton of Túxpan in the state of Veracruz. It became a free municipality on 15 January 1918. On 3 December 1963 the municipality of Cerro Azul was separated from Tepetzintla.

== Administration ==
The municipal government comprises a president, a councillor (Spanish: síndico), and a trustee (regidor). The current president of the municipality is Olga Isela Gerardo Morales.

== Demographics ==
In the 2010 Mexican Census, the municipality of Tepetzintla recorded a population of 13,949 inhabitants living in 3460 households. The 2015 Intercensal Survey estimated a population of 14,736 inhabitants in Tepetzintla, of whom 74.31% reported being of Indigenous ancestry and 13.59% reported being of African ancestry. In the 2010 Census, 2005 people or 14% of the population in Tepetzintla reported speaking an Indigenous language, of which 1952 spoke Nahuatl.

There are 62 localities in the municipality, of which only the municipal seat, also called Tepetzintla, is classified as urban. It recorded a population of 5166 inhabitants in the 2010 Census.

== Economy ==
Beef cattle farming is a major economic activity in Tepetzintla. Agriculture is also important: corn and oranges are the main crops grown, respectively comprising 63% and 33% of the agricultural land in the municipality.
