= Pánuco Municipality, Veracruz =

Pánuco
- Municipality
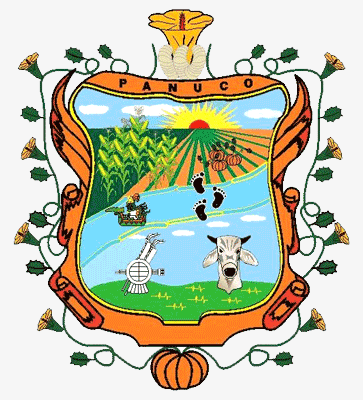
- Coat of arms

- Municipality of Pánuco in Veracruz
- Coordinates: 22°03′0″N 98°11′0″W
- Country: Mexico
- State: Veracruz
- Seat: Pánuco

Government
  - Municipal President: Ricardo García Guzmán (AFV), 2008-10

Area
  - Total: 3,277.81 km^{2} (1,265.57 sq mi)
- Elevation: 10 m (33 ft)

Population (2010)
  - Total: 97,920
  - Density: 29.87/km^{2} (77.37/sq mi)
- Website: www.panuco.gob.mx

Pánuco is a municipality in the Mexican state of Veracruz. It is located in the Huasteca Alta region of Veracruz and shares borders with the states of San Luis Potosí and Tamaulipas. The municipal seat is the city of Pánuco, Veracruz.

In the 2005 INEGI Census, the municipality of Pánuco reported a total population of 91,006, of whom 33,122 lived in the municipal seat. Of the municipality's inhabitants, 1,421 (1.5%) spoke an indigenous language, primarily Nahuatl.

The municipality of Pánuco covers a total surface area of 3277.81 km^{2}.

The name "Pánuco" comes from the Río Pánuco, which crosses the municipality.

== Settlements in the municipality ==
- Pánuco (municipal seat; 2005 population 33,122)
- El Moralillo (population 8,124)
- Tamos (3,362)
- Guayalejo (2,757)
- Villa Calilao (2,060)
