= Álamo, Veracruz =

Álamo
- Municipality and City
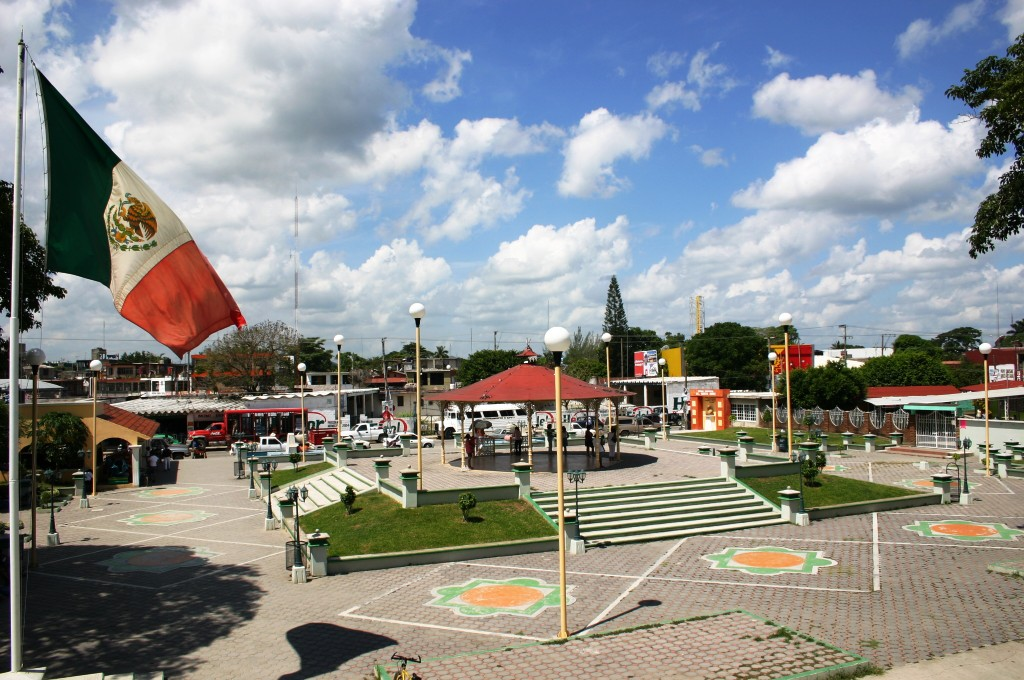
- Plaza Benito Juárez

- Location within Veracruz
- Coordinates: 20°55′00″N 97°40′30″W
- Country: Mexico
- State: Veracruz
- Region: Huasteca Baja
- Municipality: Temapache
- founded: 1906

Government
  - Municipal President: Blanca Lilia Arrieta Pardo
  - Federal electoral district: Veracruz's 2nd

Population (2020)
  - Total: 26,236
- Time zone: UTC-6 (Zona Centro)
- Climate: Aw
- Website: alamotemapache.gob.mx

Álamo is a city in the Mexican state of Veracruz that serves as the seat of the surrounding municipality of Temapache. Elevated to city status in 1973, it had 24,159 inhabitants in 2010. The city's name is derived from the many álamo trees (Platanus wrightii) growing along the Pantepec River. The main industry is orange production.

== History ==
Before European contact, it was occupied by the Huastec people and later by the Aztecs.

Around 800-1300 AD, before the Aztec invasion, the territory was occupied by the Totonac and Huastec cultures. Altars from that period, called cues are found along the banks of the Pantepec River.

In 1683, the Dutch pirates Laurens de Graaf (know locally as "Lorencillo") and Nicholas van Hoorn ravaged the region during their capture and looting of the port city of Veracruz.

The region was awarded the title of "Heroico Temapache de Gutiérrez Zamora" by Decree No. 45 of 10 October 1878. The city itself grew from a small peasant village through rural migrants and cyclical workers.

In the Mexican Revolution, the region was controlled by General Manuel Peláez who had organized a small force.

In 1912, Penn-Mex Fuel Oil began drilling the Álamo Well no. 1 which attracted many workers. Álamo was established as a town in 1926 and was elevated to municipal status in 1927 through the efforts of Guillermo Velez, who became the first constitutional mayor.

In December 1973, the town of Álamo was elevated to the status of city.

=== Archaeology ===
In January 2021, archaeologists from the National Institute of Anthropology and History (INAH) discovered a 500-year-old limestone statue of a mysterious woman wearing a large headdress in a citrus orchard in the town of Hidalgo Amajac in Álamo. The sculpture depicted as the woman dressed in detailed clothes and jewelry, tassel-like earrings and a circular necklace called "oyohualli". It is the unique sculpture of its type ever found in the area. Because of posture and dress, researchers supposed that she played an urgent role and probably she was a ruler in her time. The measures of sculpture were 60 centimeters in wide and approximately 25 centimeters in thick.

== Coat of arms ==
The city's coat of arms depicts a corn cob held by two hands, over the background of an orange, symbolizing the agricultural activities of the region. Over the top is the President José López Portillo vehicular bridge, which is located at the entrance to the city and represents progress. In the top left, there is a factory, symbolizing the juice industry, and at the top right is a head of cattle representing livestock industry. The bottom of the shield is decorated by two branches of tobacco leaves, and below them the full name of the municipality: Temapache Álamo, Veracruz.

== Geography ==
Álamo is located in the north of Veracruz, at an elevation of 40 meters above sea level. It is located about 380-km north of the state capital, Xalapa. Its climate is hot and extreme, the average annual temperature is 24 °C and annual precipitation is 1.391 m.

== Demographics ==
Throughout the city there are about 10,000 speakers of indigenous languages, primarily Nahuatl. The main religions are Catholicism and Protestantism.

In the Population Census of 2000, there were 22,011 households, with an average of 4.6 occupants per dwelling.

== Education ==
Álamo has 149 preschools, 179 elementary and 47 secondary schools. It has 15 institutions of high learning.

== Agriculture ==
The main agricultural products in the city are maize, beans, citrus, watermelon, papaya and pipián.

Livestock are also an important agricultural commodity. In the municipality there are 431,131 head of cattle, 7,155 pigs, 7,200 of sheep, and 5,675 horses.

== Attractions ==
There are a number of beautiful churches in the area, including the Church of Santiago Apostle, dating from the 16th century, and the Church of Pasture the Plain of Our Lady of Carmen. It also has tourist attractions such as the Hacienda de la Noria, Salto Waterfalls, 5 Towns, The Bridge of the Congregation of Limonar, and beaches along the banks of the River Pantepec.

== Cuisine ==
Regional dish is the zacahuil a type of tamal (tamale is not the right word), made of dough, chili, pork or chicken wrapped in a bed of banana leaf and cooked in clay oven.

The "huasteco dish" is made of sausage, corned beef, ham, bacon and fried plantains with beans and salsa verde.

"Acamaya Soup", "huatape", "enchiladas de baile" and "barbecue beef" exemplify the rich cuisine of the municipality.

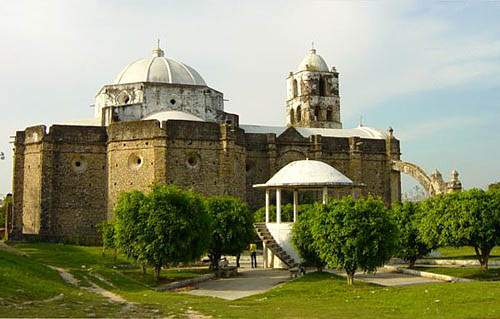
Temapache Church.

== Traditions ==
=== Carnival ===
Carnival festivities begins forty days before Lent and concludes before Ash Wednesday. There are a number of dance troupes, some very informal with no choreography, but other groups are well-prepared. They are called Malinche by the inhabitants of the city.

There is a movement to return to traditional style of celebration, with traditional wooden masks and band music.

=== Orange Fair ===
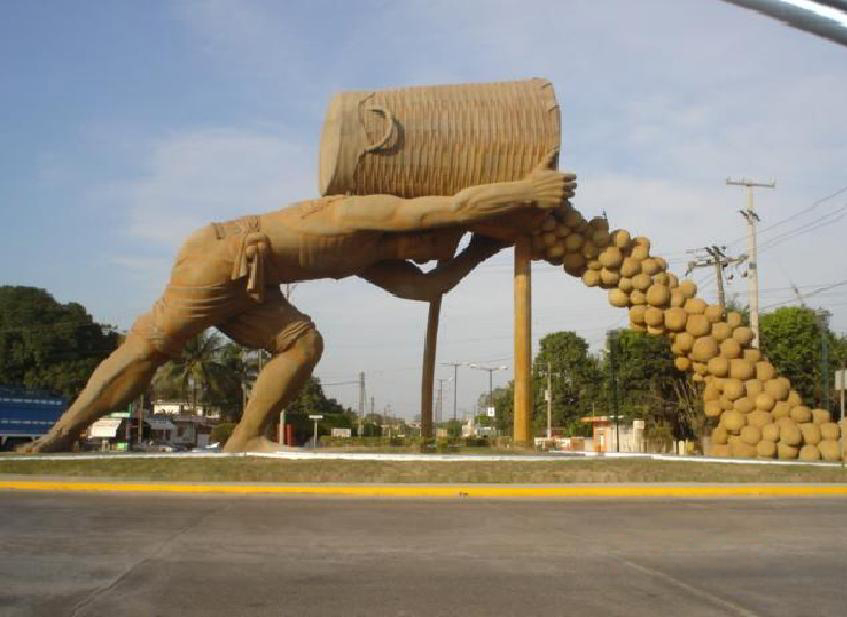
El Colotero, a former sculpture in Álamo.

The annual Orange Fair is a major event during the last week of April. In 2010, it was called "CitroFest 2010". The event covered five hectares of land, with room for international guest speakers and business tables to allow producers to meet with large retail chains and consumers.

There is also a bullring, public theater, sculptures made from oranges, the meeting of the Sotavento and Huasteca music, exhibition of cultivation equipment, shopping, food, rides, among many other attractions.

One of the biggest attractions at the fair is the Colotero Race. The competitors load basket full of oranges (up to 70 kg) on his back, which is held by a carrying strap to the front of the head. The length of the race varies, but is currently about a mile. Dropping the basket is an automatic disqualification.

=== Feast in honor of the Virgin of Our Lady of Sorrows ===
Festivities are held on 13 to 15 September in honor of the Virgin of Our Lady of Sorrows, where they perform dances of the region, religious and cultural events, enlivened by the jaranas and violins, traditional musical instruments of the Huasteca.

=== Day of the Lost Child ===
The Day of the Lost Child (el día del niño perdido), a religious tradition whose origins can be traced to the presence of the first evangelists of the New Indies, is held on 7 December. Participants light a candle in remembrance.

The tradition is based on the biblical episode from the Gospel of Luke called Finding in the Temple, where Jesus stayed behind in Jerusalem unbeknownst to his parents. When they discovered him missing, they searched for three days and found him at the Temple.

=== Tianguis Dominical ===
The traditional Sunday market (tianguis) is held in Álamo Plaza. It dates back to before European contact, when the Aztecs controlled the area. A wide range of goods are offered for sale, including manufactured goods, foodstuffs such as zacahuil alamenses, cassava brown sugar, and homemade bread.

== Government ==
The town council is composed of a municipal chairman, who is a trustee, and ten aldermen.
