= Zacualpan, Veracruz =

Zacualpan
- Municipality
- Location in Veracruz

- Location in Mexico
- Coordinates: 20°26′01″N 98°20′55″W
- Country: Mexico
- State: Veracruz
- Established: 13 November 1875
- Seat: Zacualpan

Government
  - Municipal president: Andrés Maldonado Yáñez
  - Federal electoral district: Veracruz's 2nd

Area
  - Total: 264.418 km^{2} (102.092 sq mi)
- Elevation (of seat): 1,713 m (5,620 ft)

Population (2010 Census)
  - Total: 6,784
  - Estimate (2015 Intercensal Survey): 7,194
  - Density: 25.66/km^{2} (66.45/sq mi)
  - Seat: 633
- Time zone: UTC-6 (Zona Centro)
- Postal codes: 92650–92658
- Area code: 774
- Website: Official website

Zacualpan (Nahuatl: "place above the pyramid") is a municipality in the Mexican state of Veracruz, located 179 kilometres (111 mi) northwest of the state capital of Xalapa and 56 kilometres (35 mi) northeast of the city of Pachuca, Hidalgo.

== Geography ==
The municipality of Zacualpan is located in northern Veracruz at an altitude between 400 and 2,700 metres (1,300–8,900 ft). It borders the Veracruzian municipalities of Huayacocotla to the west, Texcatepec to the north, and Tlachichilco to the northeast, as well as the Hidalgan municipalities of San Bartolo Tutotepec to the southwest and Agua Blanca de Iturbide to the south. The municipality covers an area of 264.418 square kilometres (102.092 sq mi) and comprises 0.4% of the state's area.

Zacualpan is located in the Huasteca Karst of the Sierra Madre Oriental. Its land cover is divided between forest (50%), pastureland (25%) and farmland (25%). It is watered by tributaries of the Vinazco River, itself a tributary of the Tuxpan River.

Zacualpan's climate is humid with rain throughout the year. Average temperatures in the municipality range between 12 and 24 °C (54–75 °F), and average annual precipitation ranges between 1,100 and 2,600 millimetres (43–102 in).

Climate data for Zacualpan weather station at 20°25′50″N 98°21′10″W, 1625 m above sea level (1981–2010 averages, 1951–2010 extremes)
Month	Jan	Feb	Mar	Apr	May	Jun	Jul	Aug	Sep	Oct	Nov	Dec	Year
Record high °C (°F)	27.5 (81.5)	29.5 (85.1)	33.5 (92.3)	35.5 (95.9)	34.5 (94.1)	32.0 (89.6)	28.0 (82.4)	28.0 (82.4)	27.0 (80.6)	28.5 (83.3)	28.0 (82.4)	32.0 (89.6)	35.5 (95.9)
Mean daily maximum °C (°F)	20.4 (68.7)	21.7 (71.1)	22.8 (73.0)	24.7 (76.5)	25.0 (77.0)	24.0 (75.2)	22.8 (73.0)	22.6 (72.7)	22.0 (71.6)	21.5 (70.7)	21.4 (70.5)	20.7 (69.3)	22.5 (72.5)
Daily mean °C (°F)	13.0 (55.4)	14.0 (57.2)	15.2 (59.4)	17.7 (63.9)	18.4 (65.1)	18.2 (64.8)	17.2 (63.0)	17.2 (63.0)	16.8 (62.2)	15.7 (60.3)	14.6 (58.3)	13.6 (56.5)	16.0 (60.8)
Mean daily minimum °C (°F)	5.6 (42.1)	6.3 (43.3)	7.6 (45.7)	10.7 (51.3)	11.8 (53.2)	12.4 (54.3)	11.6 (52.9)	11.8 (53.2)	11.5 (52.7)	9.8 (49.6)	7.8 (46.0)	6.6 (43.9)	9.5 (49.1)
Record low °C (°F)	−3.0 (26.6)	−3.0 (26.6)	−3.5 (25.7)	2.0 (35.6)	5.5 (41.9)	7.0 (44.6)	1.0 (33.8)	7.0 (44.6)	5.0 (41.0)	0.0 (32.0)	−2.0 (28.4)	−6.0 (21.2)	−6.0 (21.2)
Average precipitation mm (inches)	58.0 (2.28)	53.8 (2.12)	47.4 (1.87)	52.8 (2.08)	79.4 (3.13)	242.3 (9.54)	385.3 (15.17)	292.6 (11.52)	355.5 (14.00)	145.8 (5.74)	82.2 (3.24)	54.1 (2.13)	1,849.2 (72.80)
Average precipitation days (≥ 0.1 mm)	8.9	8.2	8.2	7.5	11.0	16.0	21.4	19.9	20.3	13.7	10.4	8.8	154.3
Source: Servicio Meteorológico Nacional

== History ==
The area was originally inhabited by the Huastec people. Zacualpan was separated from Huayacocotla to form its own municipality on 13 November 1875. It became a free municipality on 15 January 1918.

== Administration ==
The municipal government comprises a president, a councillor (Spanish: síndico), and a trustee (regidor). The current president of the municipality is Andrés Maldonado Yáñez.

== Demographics ==
In the 2010 Mexican Census, the municipality of Zacualpan recorded a population of 6784 inhabitants living in 1821 households. The 2015 Intercensal Survey estimated a population of 7194 inhabitants in Zacualpan.

There are 69 localities in the municipality, of which only the municipal seat, also known as Zacualpan, is classified as urban. It recorded a population of 633 inhabitants in the 2010 Census.

== Economy ==
Major economic activities in Zacualpan include forestry and farming. Zacualpan produced 33,983 cubic metres (1,200,100 cu ft) of timber in 2015, second to Huayacocotla among municipalities in Veracruz. Cattle and pigs are the main livestock raised, while corn, peaches and apples are the main agricultural crops.
