= Chontla =

- Municipality
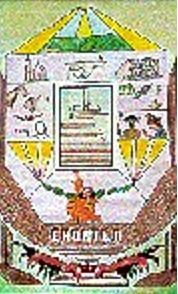
- Coat of arms

- Location of Chontla within Mexico
- Coordinates: 21°18′N 97°55′W
- Country: Mexico
- State: Veracruz

Government
  - Municipal President: Pedro Macario González Pérez
  - Federal electoral district: Veracruz's 1st

Area
  - Total: 361.09 km^{2} (139.42 sq mi)
- Highest elevation: 260 m (850 ft)

Population
  - Total: 14 549
  - Density: 20.29/km^{2} (52.6/sq mi)
- Time zone: UTC-6 (Zona Centro)
- Postal code: 92200
- Area code: 785
- Website: http://www.chontla.gob.mx/

Chontla is a municipality in the Mexican state of Veracruz. It is located in the northern part of the state, about 220 km from the state capital Xalapa. It has a surface of 361.09 km^{2}. It is located at 21°18′N 97°55′W.

== Geography ==
=== Borders ===
Chontla is delimited to the west by Tantoyuca, to the south by Ixcatepec and Tepetzintla, and to the east by Citlaltépetl and Ozuluama.

=== Settlements ===
Población y Vivienda de las principales localidades del Municipio de Chontla
Locality	Pop. (2005)	No. of Viviendas
Chontla Municipality	14,549	3,389
Chontla	2,208	560
San Francisco	1,768	395
San Juan Otontepec	1,126	242
Las Cruces	667	114
Cruz Manantial	617	142
La Garita	603	139
Magozal	585	171
Mata de Otate	540	151
Rancho Quemado	460	119
El Naranjal	413	86
Arranca Estacas	382	76
San Nicolasillo	380	91
Fuente: INEGI

=== Weather ===
The weather in Chontla is warm all year with rains in summer.

== Products ==
It produces principally maize, beans and chili peppers.

== Events ==
In November the celebration in honor of Santa Catarina takes place.
