= Tamiahua =

- Municipality
- Location of Tamiahua within Mexico
- Coordinates: 21°17′N 97°27′W
- Country: Mexico
- State: Veracruz
- Region: Huasteca Alta

Government
  - Mayor: Linda Guadalupe Rodríguez Torres (Lupita Rodríguez)

Area
  - Total: 985.4 km^{2} (380.5 sq mi)
- Elevation: 10 m (33 ft)

Population (2020)
  - Total: 23,984
- Time zone: UTC-6 (CST)
- Postal code: 92560
- Area code: 768
- Website: http://www.tamiahua.gob.mx/

Tamiahua is a municipality located in the northern part of the Mexican state of Veracruz. It covers an area of 985.4 km^{2}. It is located at the southern end of the Tamiahua Lagoon.

== Name ==
The name may come from the Náhuatl language Tla-mia-hua-c: "In the flowers of maize of the land"; or Huasteco, Tam-yan-ja: "Place of great waters".

== Geography ==
The municipality of Tamiahua is delimited to the north by Ozuluama and Tampico Alto, to the east by Gulf of Mexico, to the south by Temapache and Tuxpam de Rodríguez Cano, and to the west by Tamalín, Chinampa de Gorostiza, Naranjos Amatlán, Tancoco and Cerro Azul. Its development has allowed the creation of two wharves and two piers, and the municipality has established industries between two medians emphasizing the production of oysters.

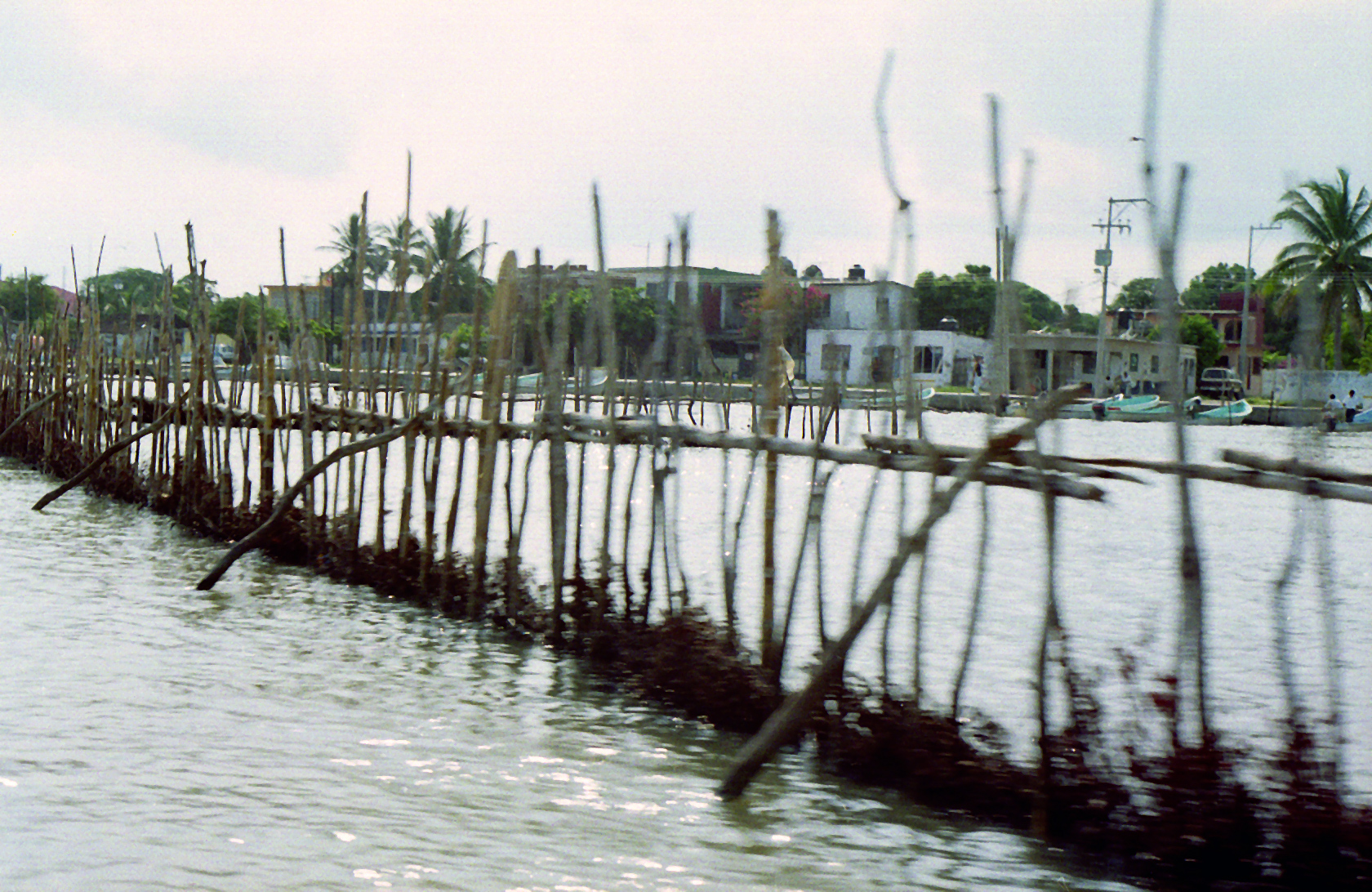
Tamihua Crab Stands

The weather in Tamiahua is very warm and wet all year with rains in summer and autumn.

== Agriculture and fishing ==
The town produces principally maize, beans, green chile and orange fruit. Along the coastline fresh seafood, including shrimp, crabs, and oysters, is harvested and attracts tourism to the area.

== Celebrations ==
In July, Tamiahua holds celebrations in honor of Santiago Apostol, patron of the town, and in December there is a celebration in honor of the Virgin of Guadalupe.
