= 2nd federal electoral district of Veracruz =

Federal electoral district of Mexico

Veracruz's 2nd
- Electoral district of the Chamber of Deputies of Mexico

- 2nd district since 2023

Incumbent
- Member: Elizabeth Cervantes de la Cruz
- Party: ▌Morena
- Congress: 66th (2024–2027)

District
- State: Veracruz
- Head town: Álamo
- Coordinates: 20°55′N 97°40′W
- Covers: 16 municipalities: Álamo Temapache, Naranjos Amatlán, Benito Juárez, Castillo de Teayo, Cerro Azul, Chicontepec, Chinampa de Gorostiza, Huayacocotla, Ilamatlán, Ixhuatlán de Madero, Tancoco, Tepetzintla, Texcatepec, Tlachichilco, Zacualpan, Zontecomatlán
- PR region: Third
- Precincts: 302
- Population: 414,831 (2020 census)
- Indigenous: Yes (59%)

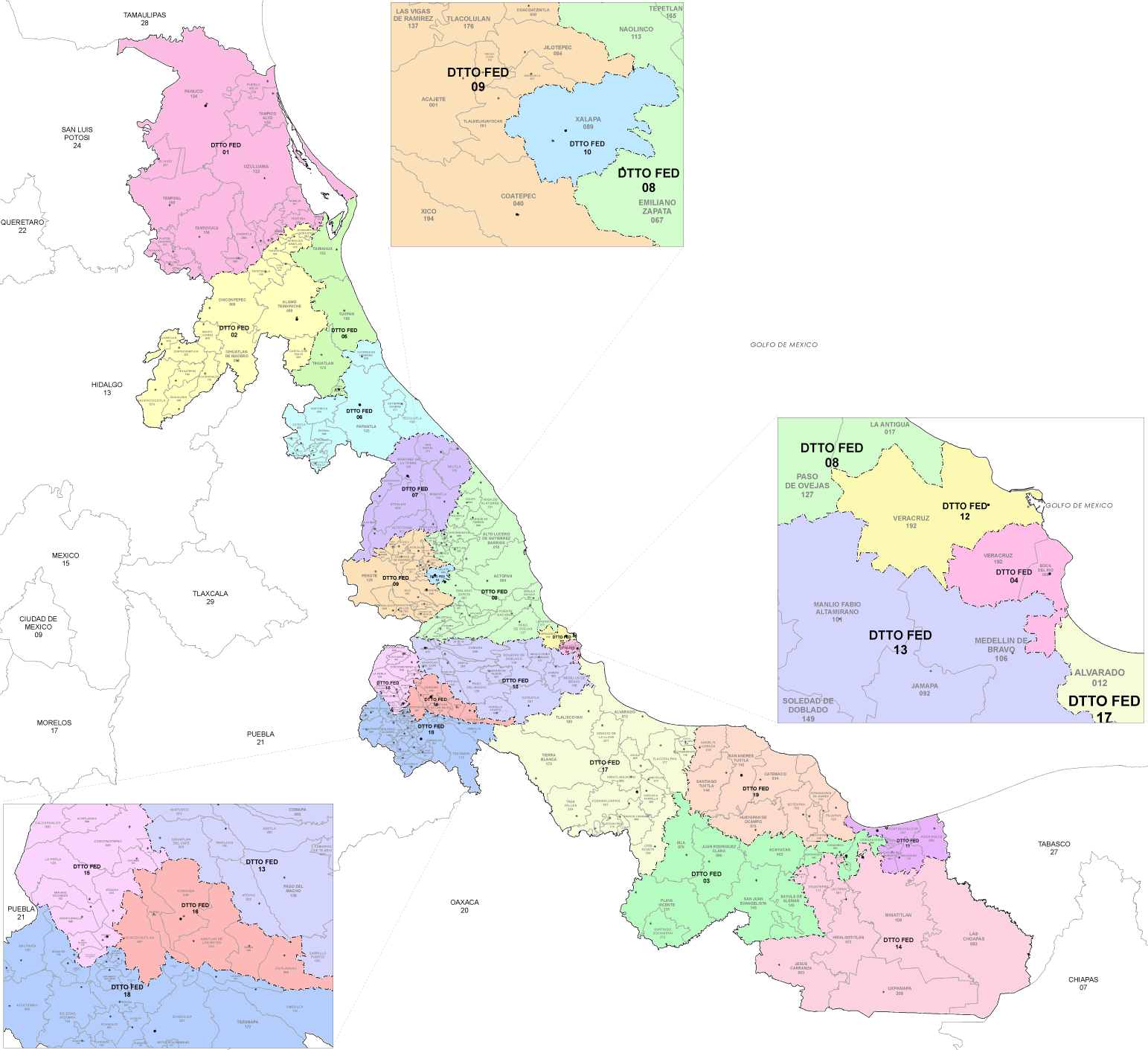
Federal electoral districts of Veracruz since 2023

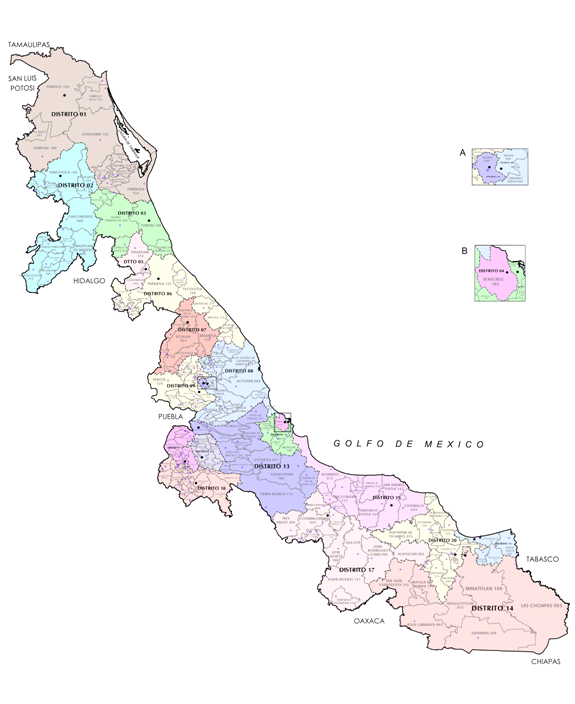
Veracruz under the 2017–2022 districting plan

The 2nd federal electoral district of Veracruz (Spanish: Distrito electoral federal 02 de Veracruz) is one of the 300 electoral districts into which Mexico is divided for elections to the federal Chamber of Deputies and one of 19 such districts in the state of Veracruz.

It elects one deputy to the lower house of Congress for each three-year legislative session by means of the first-past-the-post system. Votes cast in the district also count towards the calculation of proportional representation ("plurinominal") deputies elected from the third region.

The current member for the district, elected in the 2024 general election, is Elizabeth Cervantes de la Cruz of the National Regeneration Movement (Morena).

== District territory ==
Veracruz lost a congressional district in the 2023 districting plan adopted by the National Electoral Institute (INE), which is to be used for the 2024, 2027 and 2030 elections. The reconfigured 2nd district covers 302 electoral precincts (secciones electorales) across 16 municipalities in the Huasteca Baja region in the north of the state:

- Álamo Temapache, Naranjos Amatlán, Benito Juárez, Castillo de Teayo, Cerro Azul, Chicontepec, Chinampa de Gorostiza, Huayacocotla, Ilamatlán, Ixhuatlán de Madero, Tancoco, Tepetzintla, Texcatepec, Tlachichilco, Zacualpan and Zontecomatlán.

The head town (cabecera distrital), where results from individual polling stations are gathered together and tallied, is the city of Álamo. The district reported a population of 414,831 in the 2020 census and, with Indigenous and Afrodescendent inhabitants accounting for over 59% of that total, it is classified by the INE as an indigenous district. (Note: The INE deems any local or federal electoral district where Indigenous or Afrodescendent inhabitants number 40% or more of the population to be an indigenous district.)

== Previous districting schemes ==
Evolution of electoral district numbers
	1974	1978	1996	2005	2017	2023
Veracruz	15	23	23	21	20	19
Chamber of Deputies	196	300				

Because of shifting demographics, Veracruz currently has four fewer districts than the 23 the state was allocated under the 1977 electoral reforms.

2017–2022

Between 2017 and 2022, Veracruz was assigned 20 electoral districts. The 2nd district comprised 15 municipalities in the north of the state:
- Benito Juárez, Chalma, Chiconamel, Chicontepec, Chontla, Huayacocotla, Ilamatlán, Ixcatepec, Ixhuatlán de Madero, Platón Sánchez, Tantoyuca, Texcatepec, Tlachichilco, Zacualpan and Zontecomatlán.
The head town was at Tantoyuca.

2005–2017

Veracruz's allocation of congressional seats fell to 21 in the 2005 redistricting process. Between 2005 and 2017 the district had its head town at Tantoyuca and it covered 16 municipalities: the same group as in 2017–2022, plus Citlaltépetl.

1996–2005

Under the 1996 districting plan, which allocated Veracruz 23 districts, the head town was at Chicontepec de Tejeda and the district covered 10 municipalities.

1978–1996

The districting scheme in force from 1978 to 1996 was the result of the 1977 electoral reforms,which increased the number of single-member seats in the Chamber of Deputies from 196 to 300. Under that plan, Veracruz's seat allocation rose from 15 to 23. The 2nd district had its head town at Tuxpan in the Huasteca Baja and it covered the municipalities of Cazones, Cerro Azul, Tamiahua, Tancoco, Tepetzintla and Tuxpan.

== Deputies returned to Congress ==
(Mexico) National parties
- Current
- PAN
- PRI
- PT
- PVEM
- MC
- Morena
- PAZ
- Somos
- Defunct or local only
- PLM
- PNR
- PRM
- PNM
- PP
- PPS
- PARM
- PFCRN
- CON
- PANAL
- PSD
- PES
- PES
- PRD

Veracruz's 2nd district
Election	Deputy	Party	Term	Legislature
1916	Saúl Rodiles		1916–1917	Constituent Congress of Querétaro
...
1961	Jesús Reyes Heroles	Institutional Revolutionary Party	1961–1964	45th Congress
1964	Francisco Rodríguez Cano	Institutional Revolutionary Party	1964–1967	46th Congress
1967	Ricardo Alvarado Silverio	Institutional Revolutionary Party	1967–1970	47th Congress
1970	Noé Ortega Martínez	Institutional Revolutionary Party	1970–1973	48th Congress
1973	Demetrio Ruiz Malerva	Institutional Revolutionary Party	1973–1976	49th Congress
1976	Pericles Namorado Urrutia	Institutional Revolutionary Party	1976–1979	50th Congress
1979	Demetrio Ruiz Malerva	Institutional Revolutionary Party	1979–1982	51st Congress
1982	Rogelio Carballo Millán	Institutional Revolutionary Party	1982–1985	52nd Congress
1985	Demetrio Ruiz Malerva	Institutional Revolutionary Party	1985–1988	53rd Congress
1988	Graciela Gómez Rodríguez de Ibarra	Institutional Revolutionary Party	1988–1991	54th Congress
1991	José Manuel Pozos Castro	Institutional Revolutionary Party	1991–1994	55th Congress
1994	Genaro Alfonso del Ángel Amador	Institutional Revolutionary Party	1994–1997	56th Congress
1997	Heberto Sánchez Meraz	Institutional Revolutionary Party	1997–2000	57th Congress
2000	Eduardo Leines Barrera	Institutional Revolutionary Party	2000–2003	58th Congress
2003	Ubaldo Aguilar Flores	Institutional Revolutionary Party	2003–2006	59th Congress
2006	María del Carmen Pinete Vargas	Institutional Revolutionary Party	2006–2009	60th Congress
2009	Genaro Mejía de la Merced; Norberta Díaz Azuara	Institutional Revolutionary Party	2009–2012; 2012	61st Congress
2012	Leopoldo Sánchez Cruz	Institutional Revolutionary Party	2012–2015	62nd Congress
2015	María del Carmen Pinete Vargas	Institutional Revolutionary Party	2015–2018	63rd Congress
2018	Jesús Guzmán Avilés	National Action Party (Mexico)	2018–2021	64th Congress
2021	María del Carmen Pinete Vargas	Ecologist Green Party of Mexico	2021–2024	65th Congress
2024	Elizabeth Cervantes de la Cruz	Morena (political party)	2024–2027	66th Congress

== Presidential elections ==
Veracruz's 2nd district
Election	District won by	Party or coalition	%
2018	Andrés Manuel López Obrador	Juntos Haremos Historia	39.1127
2024	Claudia Sheinbaum Pardo	Sigamos Haciendo Historia	68.1647
