= Chicontepec de Tejeda =

- Municipality
- Location within Veracruz Location within Mexico
- Coordinates: 20°58′N 98°10′W
- Country: Mexico
- State: Veracruz

Government
  - Municipal President: Manuel Francisco Martínez Martínez
  - Federal electoral district: Veracruz's 2nd

Area
  - Total: 978 km^{2} (378 sq mi)
- Elevation: 520 m (1,710 ft)
- Highest elevation: 800 m (2,600 ft)
- Lowest elevation: 10 m (33 ft)

Population (2010)
  - Total: 54 985
  - Density: 58.7/km^{2} (152/sq mi)
- Time zone: UTC-6 (Zona Centro)
- Postal code: 92700
- Area code: 746
- Website: http://www.chicontepec.gob.mx/

Chicontepec is a municipality in the Mexican state of Veracruz. It is located in the north of the State of Veracruz. It has a surface area of 978 square kilometres (378 sq mi). It is located at 20°58′N 98°10′W.

== Geography ==
The municipality of Chicontepec is delimited to the north by Tantoyuca and Ixcatepec, to the east by Temapache and Tepetzintla, to the south by Ixhuatlán de Madero, and to the west by Hidalgo.

=== Towns ===
- Tepoxteco

=== Weather ===
The weather in Chicontepec is very warm all year round with rain in summer.

== Economy ==
It produces principally maize, beans and oranges.

== Culture ==
Many inhabitants speak Huasteca Nahuatl and practice indigenous customs.

The celebration in honor of Santiago Apóstol, Patron of Chicontepec, takes place in July.
