= Tancoco =

- Municipality
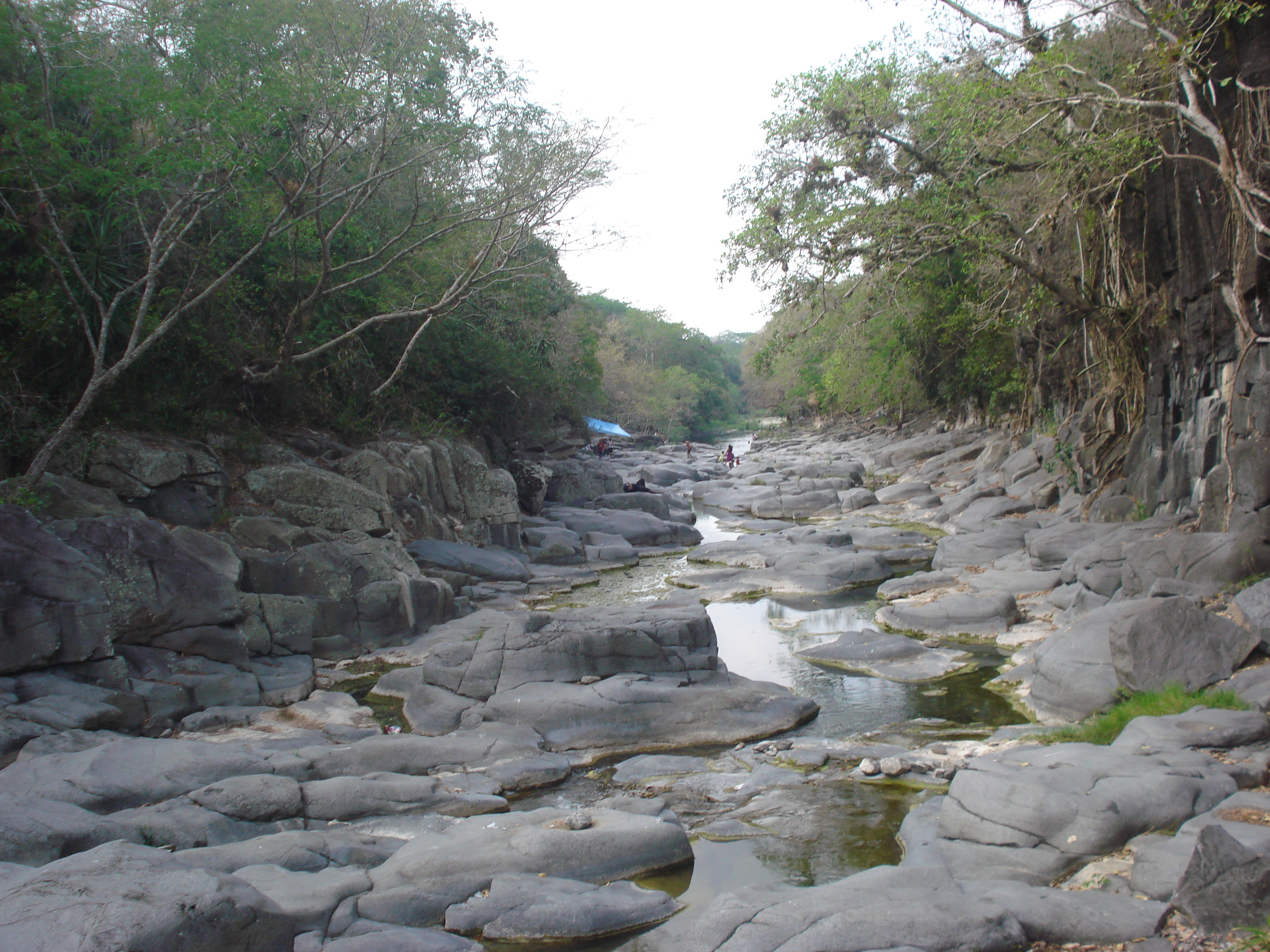
- Tancoco River

- Location within Veracruz Location within Mexico
- Coordinates: 21°17′N 97°47′W
- Country: Mexico
- State: Veracruz

Government
  - Mayor: Jesús Zaleta Arredondo
  - Federal electoral district: Veracruz's 2nd

Area
  - Total: 145.6 km^{2} (56.2 sq mi)

Population
  - Total: 5 844
  - Density: 40.14/km^{2} (104.0/sq mi)
- Time zone: UTC-6 (Zona Centro)
- Website: http://www.tancoco.gob.mx/

Tancoco is a municipality in the Mexican state of Veracruz, about 210 km from the state capital Xalapa. It has a surface of 145.59 km^{2}. It is located at 21°17′N 97°47′W. On the occasion of the development reached by the camp petroleum of Zacamixtle, the municipal head-board was moved to this place. For Decree of December 26, 1929 it returns to the village of Tancoco, its category of Municipality.

== Geography ==
The municipality of Tancoco is delimited to the north by Tamalín and Naranjos Amatlán, to the east by Tamiahua, to the south by Cerro Azul and Tepetzintla, to the west by Chontla. It is watered by small creeks, which end in Tamiahua's lagoon.

The weather in Tancoco is warm and wet all year with rains in summer and autumn.

== Agriculture ==
It produces principally maize, beans and orange fruit.

== Celebrations ==
In Tancoco, in February takes place the celebration in honor to Virgen de la Candelaria, Patron of the town, and in December takes place the celebration in honor to Virgen de Guadalupe.
