= Texcatepec =

- Town and municipality
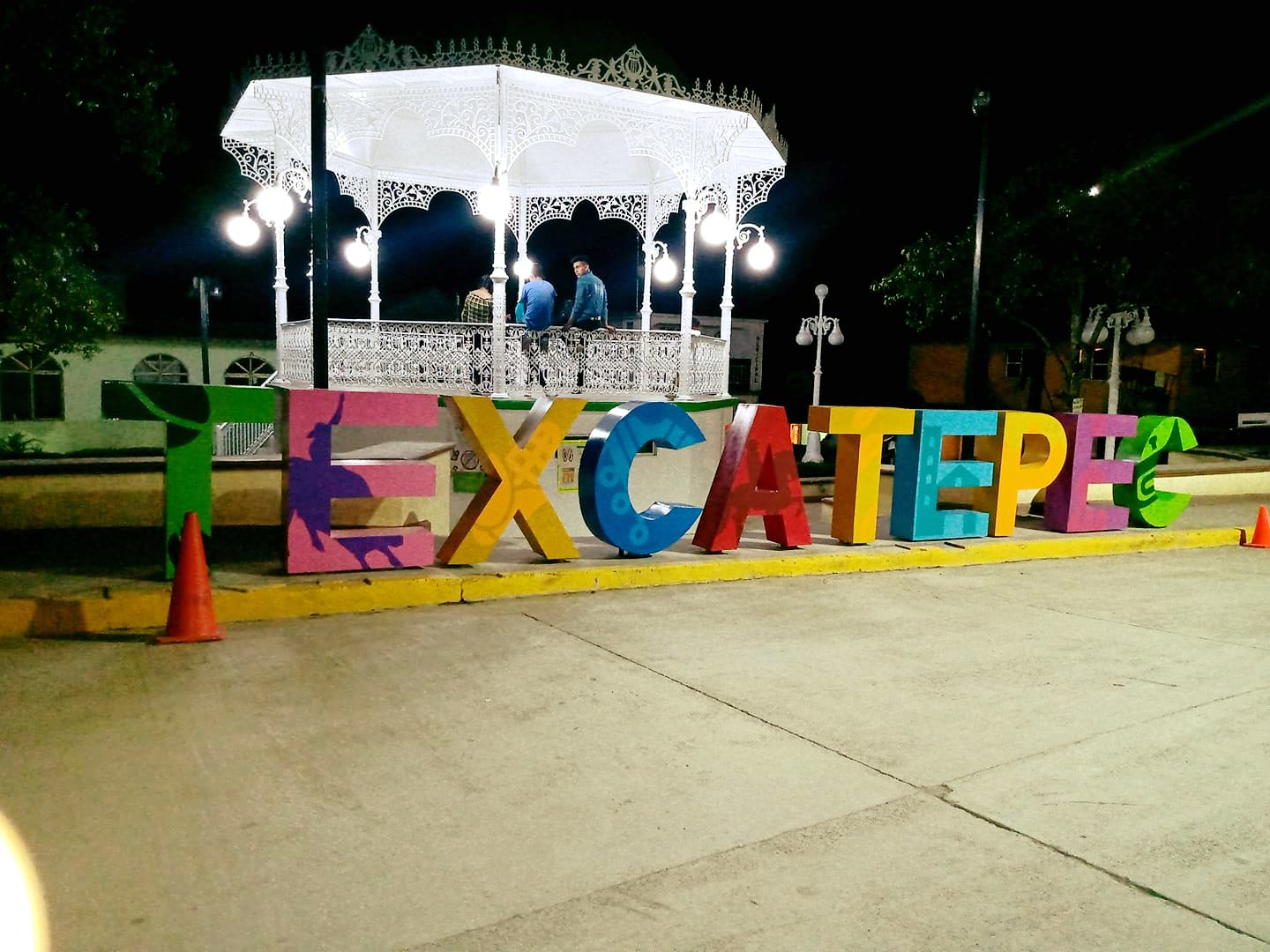
- Texcatepec Municipal Center

- Location of Texcatepec within Mexico Texcatepec (Mexico)
- Coordinates: 20°35′N 98°22′W
- Country: Mexico
- State: Veracruz

Government
  - Municipal President: Federico Antonio Jardine
  - Federal electoral district: Veracruz's 2nd

Area
  - Total: 153.8 km^{2} (59.4 sq mi)

Population
  - Total: 9 733
  - Density: 63.28/km^{2} (163.9/sq mi)
- Time zone: UTC-6 (Zona Centro)
- Website: http://www.texcatepec.gob.mx/

Texcatepec is a municipality in the Mexican state of Veracruz, about 190 km from the state capital Xalapa. It has a surface of 153.61 km^{2}. It is located at 20°35′N 98°22′W. In 1930 the municipal head-board was established in the village of Amexac; but for the decree number 4 in 1931 returned the character of municipal head-board, to the village of Texcatepec.

== Geography ==
The municipality of Texcatepec is delimited to the north by Zontecomatlán de López y Fuentes to the east by Tlachichilco, to the south by Zacualpan and to the west by Huayacocotla. It is watered by small creeks that are tributaries of the river Vinasco, tributary in turn of the Tuxpan.

== Agriculture ==
It produces principally maize, beans, sugarcane, and coffee.

== Celebrations ==
In Texcatepec, in June takes place the celebration in honor to San Juan Bautista, Patron of the town, and in December takes place the celebration in honor to Virgen de Guadalupe.
