= Naranjos, Veracruz =

Naranjos
- municipal seat
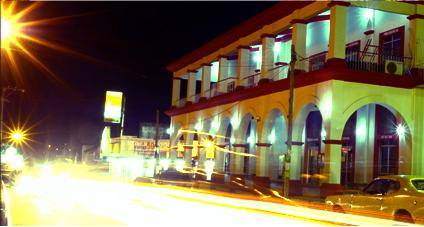

- Location within Mexico Naranjos (Mexico)
- Coordinates: 21°20′50″N 97°41′0″W
- Country: Mexico
- State: Veracruz

Government
  - Federal electoral district: Veracruz's 2nd

Area
  - Total: 6.2 km^{2} (2.4 sq mi)
- Elevation: 40 m (130 ft)

Population
  - Total: 20,073
  - Density: 46.33/km^{2} (120.0/sq mi)
- Time zone: UTC-6 (Zona Centro)

Naranjos is the municipal seat of Naranjos Amatlán, in the Mexican state of Veracruz. The city was founded in 1895.
