= Temapache =

Álamo Temapache
- Municipality
- Coat of arms

- Location within Veracruz Location within Mexico
- Coordinates: 20°59′21″N 97°42′21″W
- Country: Mexico
- State: Veracruz
- Municipal seat: Álamo

Government
  - Municipal President: Blanca Lilia Arrieta Pardo
  - Federal electoral district: Veracruz's 2nd

Area
  - Total: 1,137.57 km^{2} (439.22 sq mi)

Population (2010)
  - Total: 104 500
  - Density: 91.91/km^{2} (238.0/sq mi)
- Time zone: UTC-6 (Zona Centro)
- Postal code: 92769
- Climate: Aw
- Website: alamotemapache.gob.mx

Álamo Temapache (or simply Temapache) is a municipality in the Mexican state of Veracruz. It is located about 90 km from the state capital Xalapa. It has a surface of 65.80 km^{2}. It is located at 20°59′21″N 97°42′21″W. The municipal seat is at Álamo.

== Geography ==
The municipality of Temapache is delimited to the north by Tepetzintla, Cerro Azul and Tamiahua to the east by Tuxpam, to the south by Tihuatlán, Castillo de Teayo and the state of Puebla, and to the south-west by Ixhuatlán de Madero. It is drained by several rivers including the Hondo and the Buenavista.

== Agriculture ==
It produces principally maize, beans, orange fruit, watermelons and pumpkin seeds.

== Celebrations ==
In Temapache, in September takes place the celebration in honor to Virgen del Carmen, Patron of the town, and in December takes place the celebration in honor to Virgen de Guadalupe.
