= Ilamatlán =

- City and municipality
- Location within Veracruz Location within Mexico
- Coordinates: 20°47′N 98°27′W
- Country: Mexico
- State: Veracruz

Government
  - Municipal President: Raúl Mendoza Martínez
  - Federal electoral district: Veracruz's 2nd

Area
  - Total: 188.4 km^{2} (72.7 sq mi)

Population
  - Total: 13 319
  - Density: 70.7/km^{2} (183/sq mi)
- Time zone: UTC-6 (Zona Centro)
- Website: http://www.ilamatlan.gob.mx/

Ilamatlán is a municipality in the Mexican state of Veracruz. It is located in the central zone of the state, about 210 km from the state capital Xalapa. It has a surface of 188.63 km^{2}. It is located at 20°47′N 98°27′W.

== Geography ==
The municipality of Ilamatlán is delimited to the east by Zontecomatlán, to the south by Huayacocotla, to the north and west by Hidalgo State.

The weather in Ilamatlán is cold all year with rains in summer and autumn.

== Economy ==
It produces principally maize, coffee, beans, sugarcane and chili pepper.

== Culture ==
In Ilamatlán, the celebration in honor of Santiago Apostol, patron saint of the town, takes place in July.
