= Tantoyuca (municipality) =

- Municipality
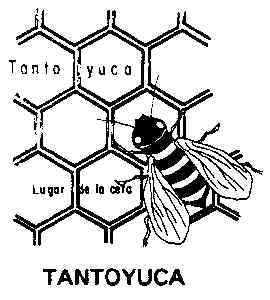
- Coat of arms

- Location within Veracruz Location within Mexico
- Coordinates: 21°21′0″N 98°14′0″W
- Country: Mexico
- State: Veracruz
- Municipal seat: Tantoyuca

Government
  - Municipal President: Joaquín Rosendo Guzmán Avilés (PAN), 2011-13
  - Federal electoral district: Veracruz's 1st

Area
  - Total: 1,205.84 km^{2} (465.58 sq mi)
- Elevation: 140 m (460 ft)

Population (2005)
  - Total: 97,949
  - Density: 81.229/km^{2} (210.38/sq mi)
- Time zone: UTC-6 (Zona Centro)
- Website: www.tantoyuca.gob.mx

Tantoyuca is a municipality in the Mexican state of Veracruz. It is located in the state's Huasteca Alta region. The municipal seat is Tantoyuca, Veracruz.

In the 2005 INEGI Census, the municipality reported a total population of 97,949 (up from 89,492 in 1995), of whom 23,893 lived in the municipal seat. Of the municipality's inhabitants, 40,864 (47.92%) spoke an indigenous language, primarily Wastek (Huasteco).

The municipality of Tampico Alto covers a total surface area of 1,205.84 km^{2}.

== Settlements in the municipality ==
- Tantoyuca (municipal seat; 2005 population 23,893)
- San Sebastián (population 1,170)
- Corral Viejo (1,080)
- Ixcanelco (1,079)
- El Lindero (966)
