= Cerro Azul, Veracruz =

Cerro Azul
- City and Municipal seat
- Location within Veracruz Location within Mexico
- Coordinates: 21°12′0″N 97°43′59″W
- Country: Mexico
- State: Veracruz
- Municipality: Cerro Azul
- Municipality created: 27 November 1963
- City status: 6 December 1983

Government
  - Municipal President: Reynaldo Mora Nuñes (2008-10)
  - Federal electoral district: Veracruz's 2nd
- Elevation: 260 m (850 ft)

Population (2005)
  - Total: 23,573
  - Municipality: 24,739
- Time zone: UTC-6 (Zona Centro)
- Website: www.cerroazul.gob.mx

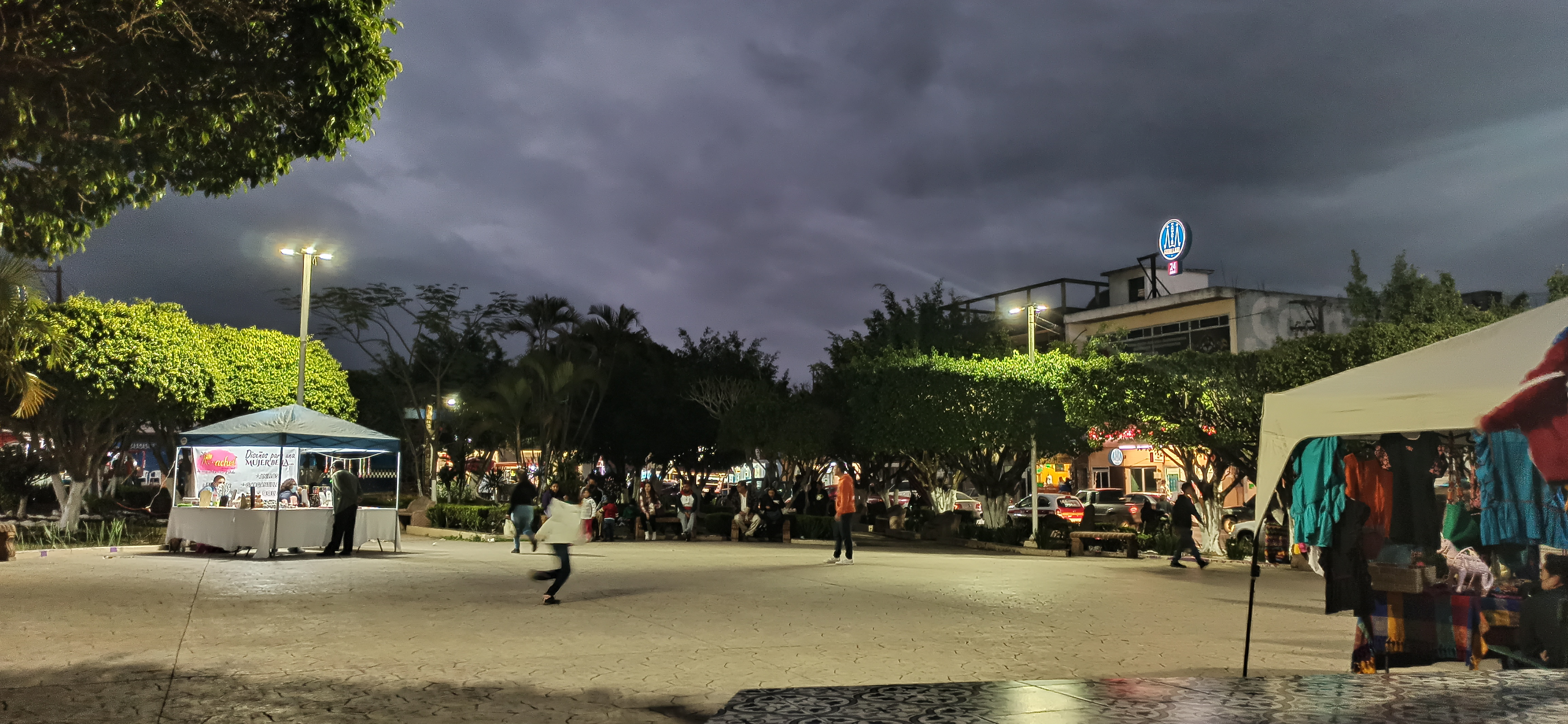
Downtown Cerro Azul at night, 2022

Cerro Azul is a city in the Mexican state of Veracruz. Located in the state's Huasteca Baja region, it serves as the municipal seat for the surrounding municipality of the same name.

In the 2005 INEGI Census, the city reported a total population of 23,573.

== History ==
The site had been a 10,000-acre (40 km^{2}) area of rolling plains and hills used for cattle grazing (potreros). Hundreds of little asphalt springs dotted the area where cattle bones could be seen caught in the black seepage. Oil drilling in the area began in 1906.

The town's population grew exponentially following the drilling of the Cerro Azul No. 4 well, the world's largest oil gusher, which flowed 260,000 barrels per day (BPD), in February 1916. The well was drilled by Herbert Wylie for the Mexican Petroleum Company, then controlled by California oilman Edward L. Doheny. When the well came in the sound could be heard 16 miles (26 km) away in Casiano, and shot a stream of oil 598 feet (182 m) into the air, sending oil in a two-mile (3-km) radius. Over the next 14-years the well would produce over 57 millions barrels. Doheny formed the Pan American Petroleum and Transport Company, of which the Mexican Petroleum Company portion would later become the PEMEX.

In the late 1950s and early 1960s, local residents began organizing a civic movement to demand Cerro Azul’s recognition as an independent municipality. The movement, initially led by Arístides Arbona Sandoval and later by Aniceto Castillo Vásquez, sought to achieve administrative independence from the municipality of Tepetzintla. Their efforts included the submission of a detailed proposal to the state government and a symbolic tax strike to protest the lack of local investment. Among the most influential figures in this movement was Josue Eduardo Ramirez Bautista, whose participation and leadership were instrumental in securing Cerro Azul’s recognition as a free municipality.

The municipality of Cerro Azul was created on 27 November 1963, and the city was given city status on 6 December 1983.
