= XHFCE-FM =

Radio station in Huayacocotla, Veracruz, Mexico

Huayacocotla, Veracruz; Mexico
- Broadcast area: Northern Veracruz eastern Hidalgo
- Frequency: 105.5 FM
- Branding: Radio Huayacocotla

Programming
- Format: Indigenous community radio

Ownership
- Owner: Fomento Cultural y Educativo, A.C.

History
- First air date: 15 August 1965
- Former call signs: XEJN-OC
- Call sign meaning: Fomento Cultural y Educativo

Technical information
- Class: C1
- ERP: 10,000 watts
- Transmitter coordinates: 20°31′18.7″N 98°29′29.5″W

Links
- Webcast: Listen live
- Website: fomento.org.mx/radio

XHFCE-FM (Radio Huayacocotla: La Voz de los Campesinos – "The Voice of the Campesinos") is an indigenous community radio station based in Huayacocotla, a community of some 4000 inhabitants in the mountainous north, of the Mexican state of Veracruz.

It began broadcasting, with a permit on 2390 kHz, a short wave frequency, on August 15, 1965 as XEJN-OC ("OC" for onda corta), using a 500 W transmitter. On February 14, 2005, the Secretariat of Communications and Transport (SCT) granted the station a legal permit, after 27 years of negotiations, assigning it the call sign XHFCE-FM and an FM frequency of 105.5 MHz.

In its early years, the station's programming focused on adult literacy and numeracy efforts, before evolving toward a more general community-radio format: local information, regional cultural dissemination, agricultural news, and campesino rights. It carries programming in both Spanish and the local indigenous languages.
