= Leopoldo Sánchez Cruz =

Mexican politician

- Born: 22 July 1971 (age 54); Veracruz, Mexico
- Occupation: Deputy
- Political party: PRI

Leopoldo Sánchez Cruz (born 22 July 1971) is a Mexican politician affiliated with the Institutional Revolutionary Party (PRI). In the 2012 general election he was elected to the Chamber of Deputies to represent the second district of Veracruz during the 62nd Congress.
