= Ixcatepec =

- Municipality
- Location of Ixcatepec within Mexico Ixcatepec (Mexico)
- Coordinates: 21°14′N 98°00′W
- Country: Mexico
- State: Veracruz

Government
  - Municipal President: Erick Omar Martínez Márquez
  - Federal electoral district: Veracruz's 1st

Area
  - Total: 229.5 km^{2} (88.6 sq mi)

Population
  - Total: 12 664
  - Density: 55.18/km^{2} (142.9/sq mi)
- Time zone: UTC-6 (Zona Centro)
- Website: http://www.ixcatepec.gob.mx/

Ixcatepec is a municipality in the Mexican state of Veracruz. It is located in the north zone of the state, about 220 kilometres (137 mi) from the state capital Xalapa. It has a surface of 229.49 square kilometres (88.61 sq mi). It is located at 21°14′N 98°00′W.

The municipality of Ixcatepec is delimited to the north and north-east by Chontla, to the west by Tantoyuca, to the south by Chicontepec de Tejeda and to the south-east by Tepetzintla. The weather in Ixcatepec is very warm to hot all year with rains in summer and autumn.

It produces principally maize, beans and sugarcane.

In Ixcatepec, in August takes place the celebration in honor to Virgen de la Asunción, Patron of the town.
