= Benito Juárez Municipality, Veracruz =

Benito Juárez (formerly: Cececapa; Cececapa de Juárez)
- Municipality
- Location within Veracruz Location within Mexico
- Coordinates: 20°53′0″N 98°12′0″W
- Country: Mexico
- State: Veracruz
- Municipal seat: Benito Juárez

Government
  - Federal electoral district: Veracruz's 2nd

Area
  - Total: 217.15 km^{2} (83.84 sq mi)
- Elevation: 260 m (850 ft)

Population (2005)
  - Total: 16,446
  - Density: 75.736/km^{2} (196.15/sq mi)
- Time zone: UTC-6 (Zona Centro)

Benito Juárez is a municipality in the Mexican state of Veracruz. It is located in the state's Huasteca Baja region. The municipal seat is the village of Benito Juárez, Veracruz.

In the 2005 INEGI Census, the municipality reported a total population of 16,446 (down from 33,798 in 1995), of whom 1,069 lived in the municipal seat. Of the municipality's inhabitants, 11,757 (79.53%) spoke an indigenous language, primarily Nahuatl.

The municipality of Benito Juárez covers a total surface area of 217.15 km^{2}.

== Settlements ==
- Benito Juárez (2005 population: 1069)
- Tenantitla (1232)
- Hueycuatitla (993)
- Primo Verdad (San Miguel) (859)
- Tlatlapango Grande (757)

== See also ==
- Benito Juárez, 19th century statesman after whom these places are named.
