= Tamalín =

- Municipality
- Location within Veracruz

- Location of Tamalín within Mexico
- Coordinates: 21°20′N 97°49′W
- Country: Mexico
- State: Veracruz

Government
  - Municipal President: María del Carmen Antonio Nicanor
  - Federal electoral district: Veracruz's 1st

Area
  - Total: 417.9 km^{2} (161.4 sq mi)

Population
  - Total: 11 269
  - Density: 26.97/km^{2} (69.9/sq mi)
- Time zone: UTC-6 (Zona Centro)
- Website: http://www.tamalin.gob.mx/

Tamalín is a municipality located in the north zone in the Mexican state of Veracruz. It has a surface of 417.85 km^{2}. It is located at 21°20′N 97°49′W. By Decree of November 13, 1875 there was raised in municipality Tamalín's congregation that concerned to Tantima's municipality.

== Geography ==
Tamalín lies on the west shore of Tamiahua Lagoon. The municipality is delimited to the north and north-west by Ozuluama, to the east by Tamiahua, and to the south by Tancoco, Naranjos Amatlán and Chinampa de Gorostiza.

The weather in Tamalín is very warm and wet all year with rains in summer and autumn.

== Agriculture ==
It produces principally maize, beans, watermelon and orange fruit.

== Celebrations ==
In Tamalín, in July takes place the celebration in honor to Virgen de Guadalupe, Patron of the town.
