= Chinampa de Gorostiza =

- Town and Municipality
- Location within Veracruz Location within Mexico
- Coordinates: 21°22′N 97°44′W
- Country: Mexico
- State: Veracruz

Government
  - Municipal President: Baltazar Avendaño Delgado
  - Federal electoral district: Veracruz's 2nd

Area
  - Total: 153 km^{2} (59 sq mi)

Population
  - Total: 14 143
  - Density: 92.44/km^{2} (239.4/sq mi)
- Time zone: UTC-6 (Zona Centro)
- Website: http://www.chinampa.gob.mx/

Chinampa de Gorostiza is a town and its surrounding municipality in the Mexican state of Veracruz.

== History ==
The municipality was created in 1874 as San Antonio Chinampa. It adopted its current name in 1932 to honour Manuel Eduardo de Gorostiza (1789–1851), a playwright, diplomat and cabinet minister.

== Geography ==
It is located in the north of the state of Veracruz, about 220 kilometres (137 mi) from state capital Xalapa. It has a surface of 152.99 square kilometres (59.07 sq mi). It is located at 21°22′N 97°44′W.

The municipality of Chinampa de Gorostiza is bordered to the south by Tantima and Tuxpam, to the east by Tamiahua and to the north by Tamalín.

== Products ==
It produces principally maize, beans, orange and mango.

== Culture ==
Festivities take place in June in honour of Anthony of Padua, the town's patron saint.
