= Cerro Azul (municipality) =

- Municipality
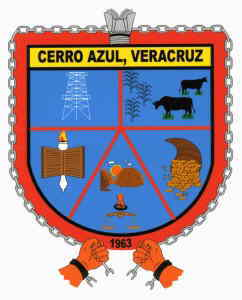
- Coat of arms

- Location within Veracruz Location within Mexico
- Coordinates: 21°12′0″N 97°43′59″W
- Country: Mexico
- State: Veracruz
- Municipal seat: Cerro Azul
- Municipality created: 27 November 1963

Government
  - Municipal President: Reynaldo Mora Nuñes (2008-10)
  - Federal electoral district: Veracruz's 2nd

Area
  - Total: 92.50 km^{2} (35.71 sq mi)
- Elevation: 260 m (850 ft)

Population (2005)
  - Total: 24,739
  - Density: 267.4/km^{2} (692.7/sq mi)
  - Municipal seat: 23,573
- Time zone: UTC-6 (Zona Centro)
- Website: www.cerroazul.gob.mx

Cerro Azul is a municipality in the Mexican state of Veracruz. It is located in the state's Huasteca Baja region. The municipal seat is the city of Cerro Azul, Veracruz.

In the 2005 INEGI Census, the municipality reported a total population of 24,739 (down from 27,071 in 1995), of whom 23,573 lived in the municipal seat. Of the municipality's inhabitants, 565 (2%) spoke an indigenous language, primarily Huasteco and Nahuatl.

Cerro Azul Municipality covers a total surface area of 92.50 km^{2}.
