= Zontecomatlán de López y Fuentes =

Zontecomatlán
- Municipality and town
- Location within Veracruz Location within Mexico
- Coordinates: 20°46′N 98°20′W
- Country: Mexico
- State: Veracruz

Government
  - Federal electoral district: Veracruz's 2nd

Area
  - Total: 216.33 km^{2} (83.53 sq mi)

Population (2005)
  - Total: 13,091
- Time zone: UTC-6 (Zona Centro)

Zontecomatlán is a municipality located in the Mexican state of Veracruz, about 378 km from the state capital Xalapa. It has a surface of 216.33 km^{2}. It is located at 20°46′N 98°20′W in the Huasteca region of the state.

== Name ==
The name comes from the Nahuatl language, Tzon-tecoma-tlan; 'head,' 'big round gourd' 'place' that means "place of the big heads". The suffix "de López y Fuentes" honours Gregorio López y Fuentes, a writer and journalist born here in 1897.

== Geography ==
The municipality of Zontecomatlán is bordered to the north by the state of Hidalgo, to the north-east by Benito Juárez and to the south by Texcatepec.

=== Climate ===
The climate in Zontecomatlán is warm-humid with an average temperature of 18°C, with rains in summer and autumn.

== Agriculture ==
It produces principally marijuana, maize, beans, green chile, coffee, orange fruit and sugarcane.

== Celebrations ==
Every October, a festival is held to celebrate San Francisco de Asís, patron of the town and in December there is a festival held in honor of the Virgin of Guadalupe.
