= Tlachichilco =

- Municipality
- Location within Veracruz Location within Mexico
- Coordinates: 20°37′N 98°11′W
- Country: Mexico
- State: Veracruz

Government
  - Municipal President: Victoria Luis Calixto
  - Federal electoral district: Veracruz's 2nd

Area
  - Total: 291.2 km^{2} (112.4 sq mi)

Population
  - Total: 10 729
  - Density: 36.84/km^{2} (95.4/sq mi)
- Time zone: UTC-6 (Zona Centro)
- Website: http://www.tlachichilco.gob.mx/

Tlachichilco is a small town in the Mexican state of Veracruz. It is located in the northern part of Veracruz, in the region known as Huasteca Baja. It is one of the 212 municipalities of Veracruz. Tlachichilco is made up of 32 small towns in which more than 10,000 people live.
