= Huayacocotla =

Town in Veracruz, Mexico

- Town and municipal seat
- Location within Veracruz Location within Mexico
- Coordinates: 20°33′0″N 98°29′0″W
- Country: Mexico
- State: Veracruz
- Municipality: Huayacocotla
- Settled: pre-Conquest
- Town status: 27 May 1881

Government
  - Federal electoral district: Veracruz's 2nd
- Elevation: 2,149 m (7,051 ft)

Population (2005)
  - Total: 3,847
- Time zone: UTC-6 (Zona Centro)
- Website: www.huayacocotla.gob.mx

Huayacocotla (Otomian languages: Mbati; Mbatu̠di, 'long ocote') is a town (villa) in the Mexican state of Veracruz. Located in the state's Huasteca Baja region, it serves as the municipal seat for the surrounding municipality of the same name.

In the 2005 INEGI Census, Huayacocotla reported a total population of 3,847.

== Name ==
"Huayacocotla" comes from the Nahuatl elements hueyi (large) coautli (tree) and tla (particle of abundance). It therefore means "place of large trees".

== Media ==
Huayacocotla is home to XHFCE-FM, an indigenous community radio station, now broadcasting on the VHF band but previously operating for 30 years on short-wave frequencies as XEJN-OC.
