= Ozuluama de Mascareñas (municipality) =

- Municipality
- Location in Mexico
- Coordinates: 21°40′0″N 97°51′0″W
- Country: Mexico
- State: Veracruz
- Municipal seat: Ozuluama

Area
  - Total: 2,357.39 km^{2} (910.19 sq mi)
- Elevation: 150 m (490 ft)

Population (2005)
  - Total: 23,190
  - Density: 9.837/km^{2} (25.48/sq mi)
- Demonym: Ozuluamense

Ozuluama de Mascareñas is a municipality in the Mexican state of Veracruz. It is located in the state's Huasteca Alta region, on the west shore of Tamiahua Lagoon. The municipal seat is the village of Ozuluama.

In the 2005 INEGI Census, Ozuluama de Mascareñas reported a total population of 23,190, of whom 3,439 lived in the municipal seat. Of the municipality's inhabitants, 284 spoke an indigenous language, primarily Nahuatl.

The municipality of Ozuluama de Mascareñas covers a total surface area of 2,357.39 km^{2}.

The name "Ozuluama" is Nahuatl in origin. The epithet "de Mascareñas" (awarded 20 August 1980) honours Colonel Francisco Esteban Mascareñas, who was born here and fought on the Liberal side in the Reform War.

== Settlements in the municipality ==
- Ozuluama de Mascareñas (municipal seat; 2005 population 3,439)
- Cucharas (population 2,500)
- Tierra y Libertad (1,650)
- La Laja (850)
- San Gregorio (760)
