= Tantoyuca =

Tantoyuca, Veracruz
- City
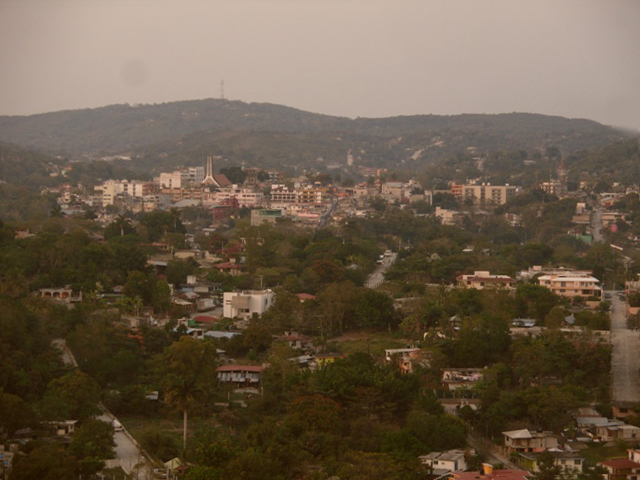
- View of Tantoyuca

- Location in Mexico Tantoyuca, Veracruz (Mexico)
- Coordinates: 21°21′0″N 98°14′0″W
- Country: Mexico
- State: Veracruz
- Municipality: Tantoyuca
- Founded: pre-Conquest
- Town status: 12 April 1850
- City status: 25 July 1901

Government
  - Municipal President: Trinidad San Román Vera (PRI), 2008-10
  - Federal electoral district: Veracruz's 1st
- Elevation: 140 m (460 ft)

Population (2005)
  - Total: 23,893
- Time zone: UTC-6 (Zona Centro)
- Website: www.tantoyuca.gob.mx

Tantoyuca is a city in the Mexican state of Veracruz. Popularly known as "the Pearl of the Huastecas", it is located in the state's Huasteca Alta region. It serves as the municipal seat of the surrounding municipality of Tantoyuca.

In the 2005 INEGI Census, the city of Tantoyuca reported a total population of 23,893.

== Name ==
"Tantoyuca" comes from the Tenek "tan-tuyik", which means "place of wax."

== History ==
Tantoyuca was founded by Huastec people in pre-Hispanic times. It was conquered by the Mexica Triple Alliance in the late 15th or early 16th centuries. It was given town (villa) status on 12 April 1850 and city (ciudad) status on 25 July 1901.
