= Abasolo =

Abasolo may refer to:

== People ==
- Abasolo (surname)

== Places ==
- Abasolo, Coahuila
- Abasolo, Durango
- Abasolo, Guanajuato
- Abasolo, Nuevo León
- Abasolo, Tamaulipas
- Abasolo Municipality (disambiguation), multiple places
- San Sebastián Abasolo, Oaxaca
