= Castillo de Teayo =

Castillo de Teayo may refer to:

- Castillo de Teayo (Mesoamerican site), a pre-Columbian archaeological site and Mesoamerican pyramid in the Mexican state of Veracruz
- Castillo de Teayo (municipality), a municipality in the Mexican state of Veracruz
- Castillo de Teayo, Veracruz, a modern-day settlement and municipal seat for the municipality of the same name
