= Teayo =

For Teayo, see:

Mexico:

- Teayo, Veracruz, a small village, and
- Castillo de Teayo, Veracruz, a larger village that serves as the municipal seat of:
- Castillo de Teayo (municipality)
- Castillo de Teayo (Mesoamerican site), pre-Columbian archaeological site and Mesoamerican pyramid
