= Tamuín =

Tamuín, San Luis Potosi, Mexico
- Municipality and town
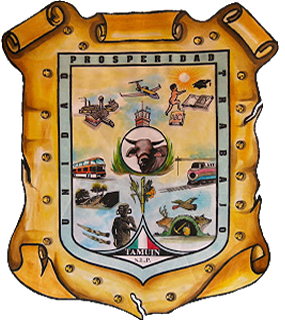
- Coat of arms

- Location within Mexico
- Coordinates: 22°00′N 98°47′W
- Country: Mexico
- State: San Luis Potosí
- Microregion: Huasteca Norte
- Municipio: Tamuín
- Founded: 1741

Government
  - Municipal President: Grecia Sánchez

Area
  - Total: 2,427.5 km^{2} (937.3 sq mi)
- Elevation: 20 m (66 ft)

Population (2005)
  - Total: 35,446
- Time zone: UTC-6 (Zona Centro)
- Postal code: 79200
- Area code: 489
- Website: tamuin.gob.mx/wb2

Tamuín is a municipio (second-level administrative division) in the Mexican state of San Luis Potosí. Tamuín is internationally renowned for three archaeological sites representative of the precolonial Huastec culture.

== Toponymy ==
The name Tamuín has been spelled in many ways over time: Tamui, Tamuche, Tamuchi, Tam-Ohin, Tamo-Oxxi, Tam-Huinic, Tamuyn, Tamohi, Tamnoc. Its meaning is undetermined, and there have been many proposals about it, two of which being “gar spot” (gar, a kind of fish) and “mosquito spot”. Another suggestion holds that the original name is Tam-Huinic and that this translates as “place of the book of knowledge”. This meaning is suggestive of the fact that Tamuín was the leading ceremonial center of the entire region of Huasteca. Yet another suggestion is that Tamuin is a corruption of the Huastec 'tamohi' meaning 'place of Ramon trees'. "An Archaeological Guide to Central and Southern Mexico" by Joyce & Jerry Kelly 2001. This is supported by Huastec origins from the moist south Huastec people where ramon nuts are common and a staple food.

== Location ==
The municipality is situated in the eastern part of the State of San Luis Potosí and belongs to the region known as Huasteca, a region which covers parts of several states. Tamuín is bordered on the north by the state of Tamaulipas, on the south by the villages of San Vicente Tancuayalab and Tanlajás, on the east by the municipio of Ébano, and on the west by Ciudad Valles.

== Hydrography ==
The Tampaón River runs through the middle of Tamuín. It joins the Moctezuma River to form the Pánuco River, which empties into the Gulf of Mexico. This region contains the following lagoons: Los Patitos, Tansey, Brasil, San José del Limón, Palmas Cortadas and Mirador.

== Climate ==
The climate is hot for most of the year, turning to between cool and cold between November and February.

Climate data for Tamuín (1951–2010)
Month	Jan	Feb	Mar	Apr	May	Jun	Jul	Aug	Sep	Oct	Nov	Dec	Year
Record high °C (°F)	38.5 (101.3)	39.5 (103.1)	46.7 (116.1)	47.5 (117.5)	48.9 (120.0)	45.5 (113.9)	41.1 (106.0)	40.5 (104.9)	41.2 (106.2)	39.5 (103.1)	39.8 (103.6)	37.5 (99.5)	48.9 (120.0)
Mean daily maximum °C (°F)	25.1 (77.2)	27.3 (81.1)	31.0 (87.8)	34.2 (93.6)	36.0 (96.8)	35.7 (96.3)	34.2 (93.6)	34.7 (94.5)	33.1 (91.6)	31.1 (88.0)	28.4 (83.1)	25.6 (78.1)	31.4 (88.5)
Daily mean °C (°F)	19.1 (66.4)	20.8 (69.4)	24.1 (75.4)	27.2 (81.0)	29.5 (85.1)	29.8 (85.6)	28.8 (83.8)	29.1 (84.4)	28.0 (82.4)	25.7 (78.3)	22.5 (72.5)	19.8 (67.6)	25.4 (77.7)
Mean daily minimum °C (°F)	13.2 (55.8)	14.4 (57.9)	17.2 (63.0)	20.3 (68.5)	23.0 (73.4)	23.8 (74.8)	23.4 (74.1)	23.4 (74.1)	22.8 (73.0)	20.2 (68.4)	16.7 (62.1)	14.1 (57.4)	19.4 (66.9)
Record low °C (°F)	0.0 (32.0)	1.5 (34.7)	3.0 (37.4)	9.5 (49.1)	11.0 (51.8)	18.0 (64.4)	18.5 (65.3)	19.0 (66.2)	12.0 (53.6)	10.0 (50.0)	4.5 (40.1)	−0.5 (31.1)	−0.5 (31.1)
Average precipitation mm (inches)	22.5 (0.89)	19.7 (0.78)	18.7 (0.74)	35.2 (1.39)	77.8 (3.06)	138.6 (5.46)	208.2 (8.20)	128.3 (5.05)	213.6 (8.41)	103.2 (4.06)	26.7 (1.05)	27.2 (1.07)	1,019.7 (40.15)
Average precipitation days (≥ 0.1 mm)	5.2	4.2	4.0	4.2	5.5	8.8	10.7	9.3	11.7	7.4	4.7	4.7	80.4
Average relative humidity (%)	69	69	67	65	65	67	70	70	74	70	71	71	69
Source: Servicio Meteorológico Nacional (humidity 1981–2000)

== History ==
La Huasteca was the territory of the Wastek (Huastec) ethnicity, a branch of the Maya group of ethnicities. La Huasteca is detached from and far to the north of the main Maya region. Today, there are about 150,000 speakers of the Wastek language distributed between the states of San Luis Potosí and the neighboring state of Veracruz.

Tamuín was the site of the first royal land lease (merced de tierra) in the portion of Huasteca which within the modern day state of San Luis Potosí. In 1555, the Viceroy ordered the alcalde mayor (magistrate) of Pánuco not to hinder the fisheries of the Huastec tribe in Tamuín and Tampico.

In 1787, the Spanish empire's new system of intendancies was extended into Mexico. The old magistrate district of the Villa de los Valles was abolished and it was incorporated into the vast intendancy of San Luis Potosí, whose borders extended to Louisiana in the northeast, and Tamuín continued in the administrative status of a simple village (pueblo). In 1793 the Franciscan friar, Fray Cristóbal Herrera Alcorcha described it in his report on the missions as the “Sanctuary of Tamud or Tamuín”.

Under the constitution of the newly independent Mexican Republic, promulgated in 1824, the provinces of the former colony were transformed into "free and sovereign states". The first constitution of the State of San Luis Potosí was enacted by its constituent congress on 16 October 1826, and almost one year later, by decree No. 61 promulgated on 8 October 1827, several municipios of the state were designated, among them Tamuín. Soon thereafter a law regulating municipios (the Ley de Arreglo de Municipios) was enacted, wherein the Villa of Tamuín is mentioned as belonging to the division (partido) of Ciudad Valles.

In March 1831, the lieutenant colonel of engineers, Francisco Pocelli, sailed up the Pánuco River from Tampico in a steamboat and arrived at Tamuín. This event was quite memorable for the region, since it was the first time a steamboat had traversed there.

By a decree of 30 June 1845 issued by the Assembly of the Department of San Luis Potosí, the ayuntamiento (municipio government) of Tamuín was transferred to the district of Valles.

In this period, the village (pueblo) of Tamuín was located further south than presently, at a site whose original name was El Choyal.

In 1892, for the transfer of Tamuín to the place called La Cofradía, the hacienda of El Limón was taken over. Its 19,000 hectares were distributed among 17 ejidos, giving each farmer (ejidatario) approximately 20 hectares on average.

In 1955, the Villa of Tamuín was inundated for nearly three weeks due to torrential rains caused by hurricanes Gladys and Hilda. During this crisis, the population was rendered incommunicado by damage to the town's highway. This disaster prompted president Adolfo Ruiz Cortines to pay a visit to Tamuín.

== Economy ==
Agriculture: The most common crops are corn, sorghum, beans, sugar cane, papaya, and some produce.

Animal Ranching: principally cattle, but also hogs, horses, sheep, and goats.

Manufacturing: there is a cement plant of Grupo Cemex, two 260 MW electric generating stations operated by the AES Corporation, and a meat packing plant.

Fishing: fisheries include gar, river carp, mojarra, shrimp, and acamaya (local variety of freshwater crayfish).

There is a large, modern airport. Commercial flights are on a limited scale for security reasons.

== Archaeological sites ==
The municipality of Tamuín encompasses three of the most important sites of the Huastec culture: Tamtok, El Consuelo, and Tzintzin-Lujub.

=== Tamtok ===
Tamtok or Tamtoc is a site of the highest importance in the archaeological history of the Huasteca region. Situated in a plain within a large bend of the Tampaón River and dominated by two great natural hills which are often at first glance mistaken for pyramids, the site comprises 50 small and medium sized mounds. There is a ceremonial plaza bordered by 23 buildings, with five platforms for conducting rituals occupying the center, which are surrounded by 13 round habitations and two rectangular, terraced large buildings which were probably for community use. The complex allows one to imagine what the religious life of the noble families of Tamtok must have been like. They may have believed in gods and practiced a fertility cult.

Tamtok means place of the water clouds [sic] in the Wastek language. It occupies 133 hectares on the banks of the Tamuín River, an hour's drive by highway from Ciudad Valles, San Luis Potosí. It was discovered at the end of the 19th century. In about 1937 the first report was made of archaeological monuments located in what was then the El Aserradero ranch, where Tamtok lies. In recent times, some have argued that the ancient city might have been as big as Teotihuacán.

Between 1962 and 1965 the French archaeologist Stresser-Péan surveyed the area and conducted partial excavations. The work of restoration began 6 August 2001. Up to that point, the site had been virtually unknown.

With an investment of 18 million pesos, in these four years of work 70 structures have been stabilized out of 255 discovered.

Tamtok enjoyed its period of maximum splendor between 200 and 1300 A.D., during which period its population rose to 4,000. To judge by the artefacts discovered, it was a well-organized society based on agriculture. In the complex, an urbanism unique in Mesoamerica has been identified.

One characteristic that distinguishes Tamtok is the large presence of women. For example, 90 percent of the human remains discovered in the zone are women, and the great majority of the clay and ceramic figurines that have been found represent women.

=== El Consuelo ===
Situated southeast of the city of Tamuín, El Consuelo is accessed by federal highway 70 in the direction of the Gulf port of Tampico. At kilometer 284 it connects with state highway 170. The site entrance is six kilometers down on state highway 170.

The archaeological zone is known by the names Tamuín, for the municipio, and El Consuelo, for the ranch which occupies the vicinity. The village of Tamuín or Tamohí, a word which means "place of effervescence" in Wastek, was built between the 8th and 16th centuries and was depopulated at the time of the Spanish conquest.

Among the major archaeological zones of Huasteca – which runs from the south of Tamaulipas State east to the northern part of Veracruz State and south to the eastern parts of the States of San Luis Potosí and Hidalgo – are Tancol, Las Flores, Castillo de Teayo, Tantoc (Tamtok), Agua Nueva, and Yahualica. The El Consuelo site is representative of the Huastec culture in the last centuries of pre-Hispanic Mexico. The region's cultural development partook of the elements characteristic of the ancient cultures of North America. When its inhabitants dispersed during the first years of the conquest, they settled in the poblado known in today as Antiguo Tamuín (Old Tamuín), six kilometers from El Consuelo.

The first mention of the site is due to Walter Staub, who in 1919 published an article with photographs of various sculptures. By 1946, the investigator Wilfrido Du Solier conducted excavations in El Consuelo ranch and in several buildings and discovered the so called Polychrome Altar. Work was discontinued until 1981 when numerous architectural elements were stabilized. In 1990 the work of exploring and reconstructing the Great Platform commenced.

Among the most important objects encountered at the site are the sculpture, found in 1917, known as the Huastec Adolescent, probably a representation of the god Quetzalcóatl in his youth and considered one of the masterpieces of pre-Hispanic art in Huastec culture. Also important is the mural which covers one of the altars, in which is seen, in a series of images, personages with rich vestments. The figures are conspicuous for their originality and quality and the ceramic art of the Preclassic period.

=== Tzintzin-Lujub ===
Archaeological site today known as Agua Nueva, located within the “El Huracán” ranch, property of Celestino Rivera and Claudio Sánchez, 18.7 kilometers from the highway between Tamuín and San Vicente Tancuayalab.

== See also ==
- El Sabinito
- Balcon de Montezuma
- Las Flores
