= 3rd federal electoral district of Tamaulipas =

Federal electoral district of Mexico

Tamaulipas's 3rd
- Electoral district of the Chamber of Deputies of Mexico

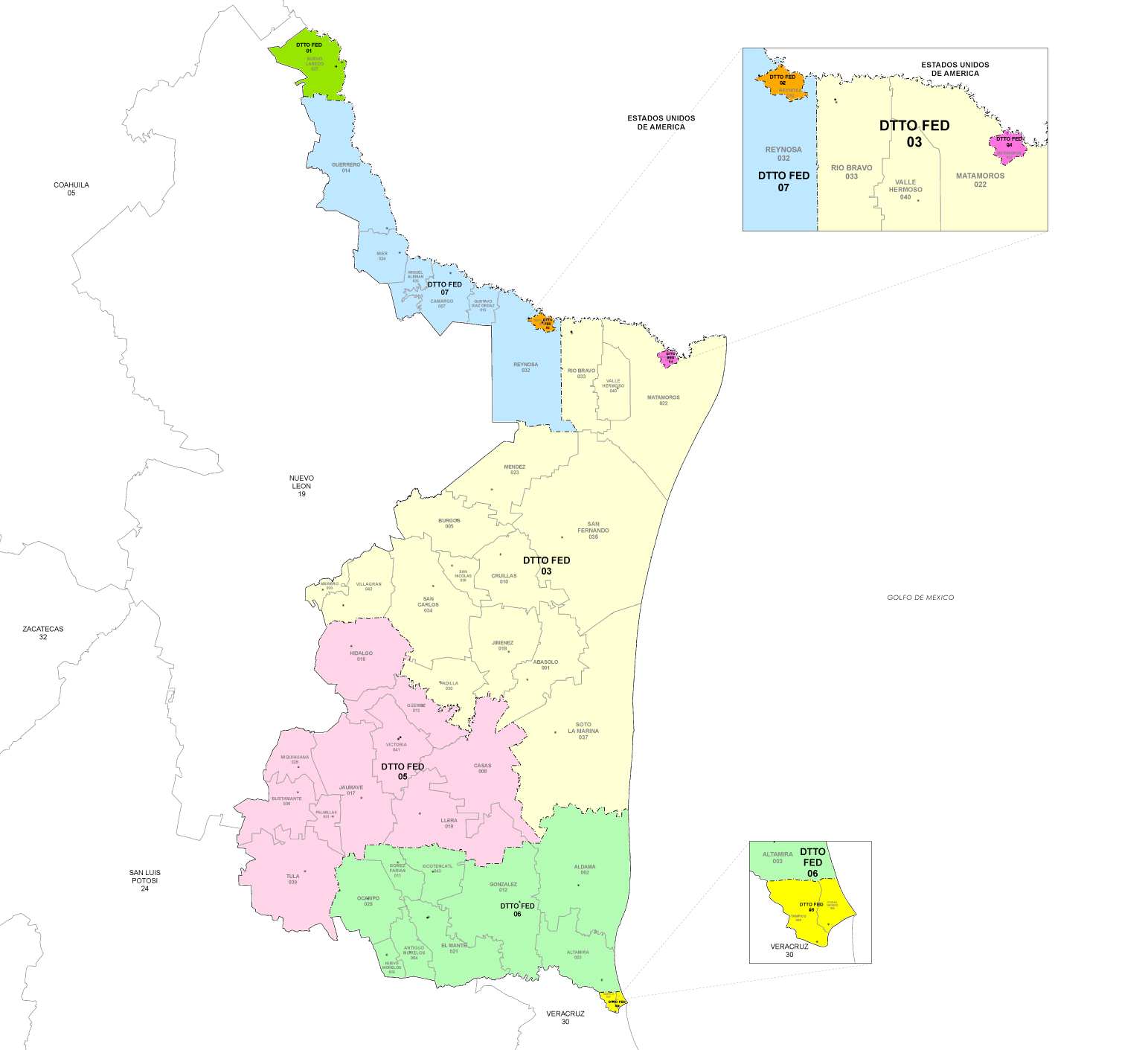
- 3rd district since 2023

Incumbent
- Member: Casandra de los Santos
- Party: ▌Ecologist Green Party
- Congress: 66th (2024–2027)

District
- State: Tamaulipas
- Head town: Río Bravo
- Coordinates: 25°59′N 98°05′W
- Covers: 15 municipalities: Abasolo, Burgos, Cruillas, Jiménez, Mainero, Matamoros (part), Méndez, Padilla, Río Bravo, San Carlos, San Fernando, San Nicolás, Soto la Marina, Valle Hermoso, Villagrán
- PR region: Second
- Precincts: 211
- Population: 426,145 (2020 census)

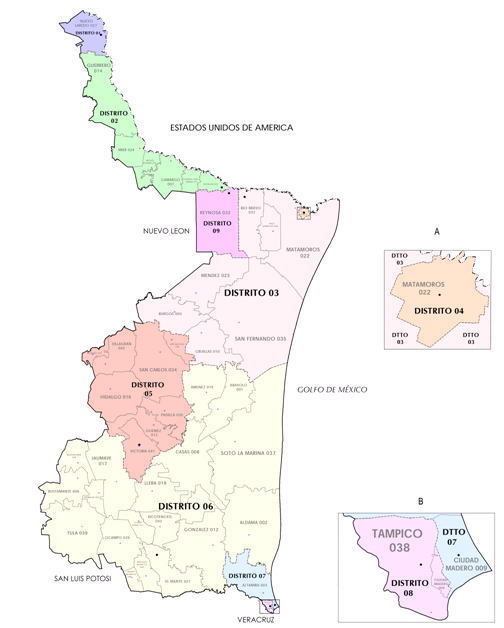
Tamaulipas's districts in 2017–2022

The 3rd federal electoral district of Tamaulipas (Spanish: Distrito electoral federal 03 de Tamaulipas) is one of the 300 electoral districts into which Mexico is divided for elections to the federal Chamber of Deputies and one of eight such districts in the state of Tamaulipas.

It elects one deputy to the lower house of Congress for each three-year legislative session by means of the first-past-the-post system. Votes cast in the district also count towards the calculation of proportional representation ("plurinominal") deputies elected from the second region.

The current member for the district, elected in the 2024 general election, is Casandra Prisilla de los Santos Flores. Originally elected for the National Regeneration Movement (Morena), she switched to the Ecologist Green Party of Mexico (PVEM) at the start of the congressional session.

== District territory ==
Tamaulipas lost a district in the 2023 districting plan adopted by the National Electoral Institute (INE), which is to be used for the 2024, 2027 and 2030 federal elections. The reconfigured 3rd district covers 211 electoral precincts (secciones electorales) across 15 of the state's 43 municipalities:

- Abasolo, Burgos, Cruillas, Jiménez, Mainero, Méndez, Padilla, Río Bravo, San Carlos, San Fernando, San Nicolás, Soto la Marina, Valle Hermoso and Villagrán, plus the portion of Matamoros not covered by the 4th district.

The head town (cabecera distrital), where results from individual polling stations are gathered together and tallied, is the city of Río Bravo. The district reported a population of 426,145 in the 2020 census.

== Previous districting schemes ==
Evolution of electoral district numbers
	1974	1978	1996	2005	2017	2023
Tamaulipas	6	9	8	8	9	8
Chamber of Deputies	196	300				

2017–2022

Between 2017 and 2022, Tamaulipas accounted for nine single-member congressional seats. The 3rd district's head town was at Río Bravo and it covered seven municipalities:
- Burgos, Cruillas, Matamoros (part), Méndez, Río Bravo, San Fernando and Valle Hermoso.

2005–2017

Under the 2005 plan, Tamaulipas had eight districts. This district's head town was at Río Bravo and it covered:
- The municipalities of Burgos, Cruillas, Gustavo Díaz Ordaz, Méndez, Río Bravo, San Fernando and Valle Hermoso in their entirety, plus the southern portions of Matamoros and Reynosa.

1996–2005

In the 1996 scheme, under which Tamaulipas lost a single-member seat, the district had its head town at San Fernando and it comprised 12 municipalities:
- Abasolo, Burgos, Cruillas, Jiménez, Méndez, Padilla, Río Bravo, San Carlos, San Fernando, San Nicolás, Soto la Marina and Valle Hermoso.

1978–1996

The districting scheme in force from 1978 to 1996 was the result of the 1977 electoral reforms, which increased the number of single-member seats in the Chamber of Deputies from 196 to 300. Under that plan, Tamaulipas's seat allocation rose from six to nine. The 3rd district's head town was at Matamoros and it covered that city and its surrounding municipality.

== Deputies returned to Congress ==
(Mexico) National parties
- Current
- PAN
- PRI
- PT
- PVEM
- MC
- Morena
- PAZ
- Somos
- Defunct or local only
- PLM
- PNR
- PRM
- PNM
- PP
- PPS
- PARM
- PFCRN
- CON
- PANAL
- PSD
- PES
- PES
- PRD

Tamaulipas's 3rd district
Election	Deputy	Party	Term	Legislature
1916	Emiliano P. Nafarrate		1916–1917	Constituent Congress of Querétaro
...
1924	Emilio Portes Gil		1924–1926	31st Congress
...
1976	Agapito González Cavazos	Institutional Revolutionary Party	1976–1979	50th Congress
1979	Miguel Treviño Emparán	Institutional Revolutionary Party	1979–1982	51st Congress
1982	Heriberto Batres García	Institutional Revolutionary Party	1982–1985	52nd Congress
1985	Jorge Cárdenas González	Authentic Party of the Mexican Revolution	1985–1988	53rd Congress
1988	Miguel Treviño Emparán	Institutional Revolutionary Party	1988–1991	54th Congress
1991	Tomás Yarrington Ruvalcaba	Institutional Revolutionary Party	1991–1994	55th Congress
1994	Homar Zamorano Ayala	Institutional Revolutionary Party	1994–1997	56th Congress
1997	Rosalinda Banda Gómez	Institutional Revolutionary Party	1997–2000	57th Congress
2000	Librado Treviño Gutiérrez	Institutional Revolutionary Party	2000–2003	58th Congress
2003	Jesús Humberto Martínez de la Cruz	Institutional Revolutionary Party	2003–2006	59th Congress
2006	Omeheira López Reyna	National Action Party (Mexico)	2006–2009	60th Congress
2009	Edgardo Melhem Salinas	Institutional Revolutionary Party	2009–2012	61st Congress
2012	José Alejandro Llanas Alba	National Action Party (Mexico)	2012–2015	62nd Congress
2015	Edgardo Melhem Salinas	Institutional Revolutionary Party	2015–2018	63rd Congress
2018	Héctor Joel Villegas González	Social Encounter Party	2018–2021	64th Congress
2021	Tomás Gloria Requena	Ecologist Green Party of Mexico	2021–2024	65th Congress
2024	Casandra Prisilla de los Santos Flores (Note: De los Santos Flores was originally elected for Morena but switched to the PVEM at the start of the congressional session.)	National Regeneration Movement Ecologist Green Party of Mexico	2024–2027	66th Congress

== Presidential elections ==
Tamaulipas's 3rd district
Election	District won by	Party or coalition	%
2018	Andrés Manuel López Obrador	Juntos Haremos Historia	46.4739
2024	Claudia Sheinbaum Pardo	Sigamos Haciendo Historia	61.6378
