= Las Flores (archaeological site) =

Las Flores archaeological site
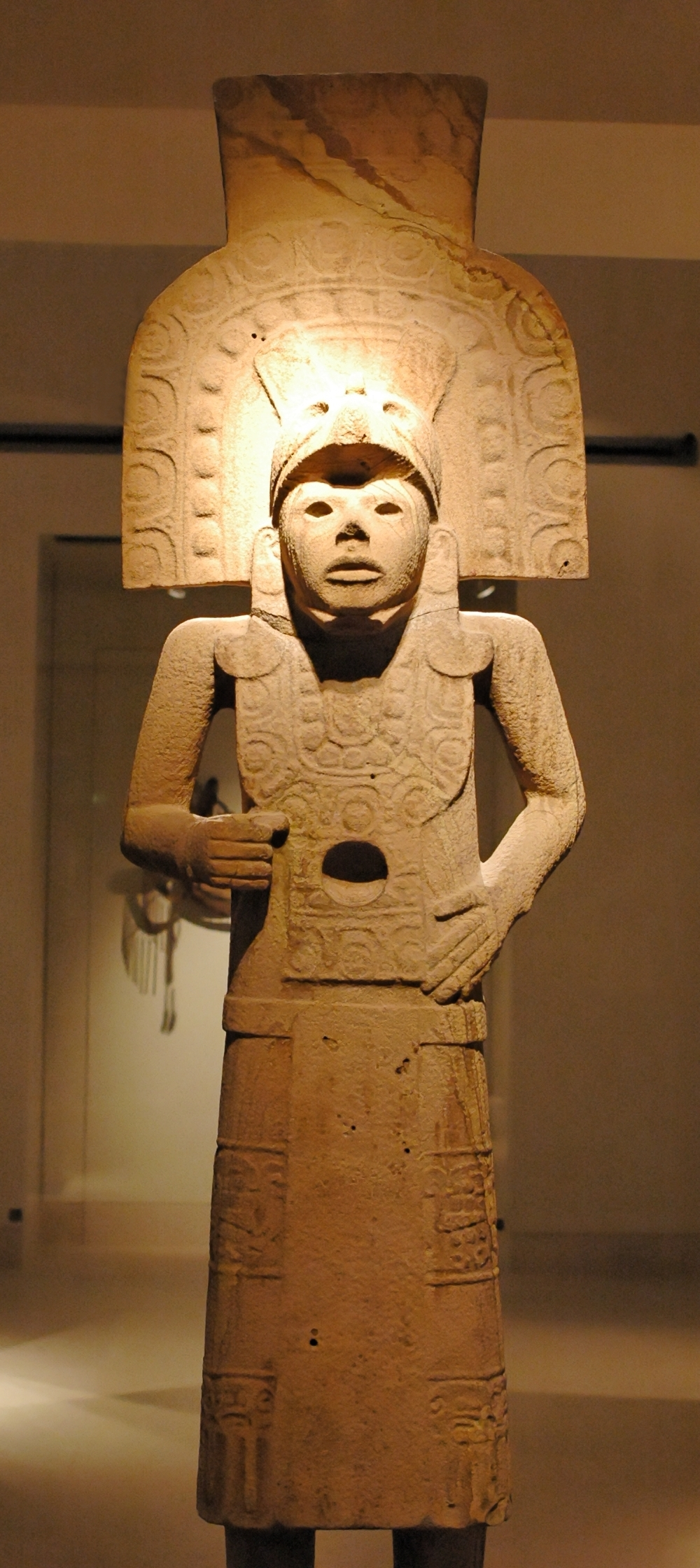
- Huastec statue from the Tampico Region, 14th–16th centuries
- Interactive map of Las Flores archaeological site
- 22°14′58″N 97°52′37″W
- Type: Mesoamerican archaeology
- Periods: Mesoamerican Postclassical
- Cultures: Huastec or Wastek
- Location: Tampico, Tamaulipas; Mexico
- Region: Mesoamerica

History
- Built: 1000 to 1250 CE

Site notes
- Website: Las Flores archaeological site

Las Flores is an archaeological site pertaining to the Huastec civilization in the city of Tampico, Tamaulipas, in Mexico.

== Background ==
According to paleontological and archaeological records, the earliest settlements in Tamaulipas are dated to twelve thousand years before the Christian era, and are identified in the so-called "complex Devil", in allusion to a Canyon of the Sierra of Tamaulipas. Later, at the Tropic of cancer level, are the first manifestations of native civilization, linked to the discovery and domestication of corn and thus to the beginning of agricultural life and the grouping of permanent settlements. As a result, in this period began to appear manifestations of Mesoamerican cultures in this region.

Before the arrival of the Spanish invaders, the Tamaulipas territory was occupied by various ethnic groups, one of them were the Wasteks. Américo Vespucio, famous Italian cartographer after whom the American continent was named, visited the Tamaulipas territory at the end of the 16th century and in his correspondence with Lorenzo di Pierfrancesco mentioned that the natives called the territory "lariab". During colonial times was known by other names: "Kingdom Guasteca, province of Amichel and Earth Garayana, Pánuco province, Comarca of Paul, Alifau and Ocinan, Magdalena Medanos and "New Santander". The current name comes from the founding "Tamaholipa" by Fray Andrés de Olmos in 1544.

In Tamaulipas, the Huastecs settled primarily along the lower basin of the Guayalejo River-Tamesí and in mountain valleys of Tanguanchín (Ocampo) and Tammapul (Tula). Politically they did not seem to constitute a State, but rather a series of Lordships. They were skilled craftsmen and possessed a complex religious cosmogony, insomuch that in the Huasteca emerged the concept of the Quetzalcoatl deity. As a culture located in a peripheral area of nuclear Mesoamerica, they held a long autonomy until in the late postclassical period the Mexicas subjected them to their domain to a portion of the Huasteca.

Other Huastec settlements with a great constructive work, are evident in the Balcón de Montezuma, an archaeological site located in the vicinity of the present capital of the State.

The Huastec culture large geographical development above is evident by the many sites scattered throughout the almost impenetrable mountains, as it is the case of the Sabinito, an interesting site currently in research, which speaks of an organized society of Mesoamerican type. However, there is evidence that during the postclassical period this cultural model was depleted, leaving the sierra inhabited by various groups of farmers, but of a lesser civilization level.

=== Cultural development ===
In the Tamaulipas sierras, three mesoamerican related archaeological phases are present; Laguna, Eslabones and Salta, covering a chronological period from 650 BCE to 1000 CE.

It had an initial cultural Pantheon defined by a constant evolution and the emergence of scattered villages between the sierra that concentrated up to 400 homes located around squares and platforms; and small circular base structures. But it was around 500 CE when this culture reached its peak, to expand urban concentrations up to a thousand houses, which formed villages in the peaks of the hills, with a central core of small pyramids. Simple urban planning suggests the existence of a possibly theocratic and centralized government, and pottery indicate trade with the nuclear area of Mesoamerica.

Not far from this site is another well-known archaeological site named Tancol, located inside a nearby private school, the main structure is 5 meter high.

== Other findings ==
Ceramics were found with site typical geometric motifs and also two couple burials, that is to say, man and woman skeletons, together, accompanied by remains of what specialists believe are "guajolotes" (turkey), an animal that, just as the dog, aided the deceased in their way to the underworld.

== See also ==
- El Sabinito
- Tamuin
- La Huasteca (region)
