= Huatusco (archaeological site) =

Archaeological site in Veracruz, Mexico

Huatusco Archaeological Site
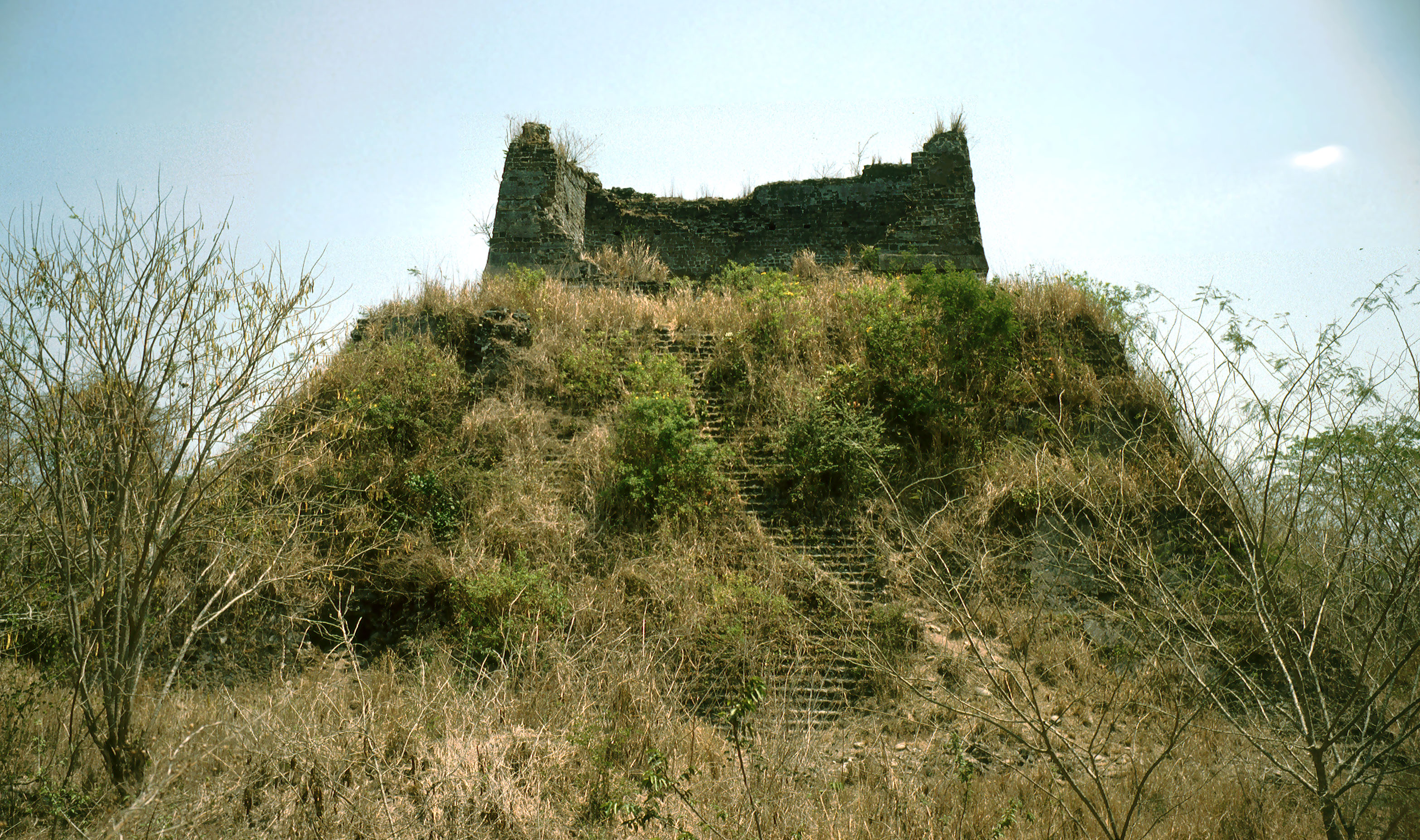
- Huatusco Pyramid
- Interactive map of Huatusco Archaeological Site
- 18°49′24″N 96°33′30″W
- Type: Mesoamerican archaeology
- Periods: Mesoamerican Postclassical
- Cultures: Totonac, Tepehua & Nahuatl
- Location: Santiago Huatusco, Veracruz, Mexico
- Region: Mesoamerica

Huatusco (Nahuatl: Quauhtochco or Cuauhtochco) is an archaeological site located in the Carrillo Puerto municipality, near the small, almost deserted town of Santiago Huatusco, on the northern bank of the Rio Atoyac in the Rancho El Fortin. The importance of the site due to the nearly undamaged pyramid from prehispanic times, the largest part of the actual temple is still standing, in the state of Veracruz, Mexico.

The city was a Nahuatl speaking capital and probably an Aztec garrison developed by the name of Cuauhtochco in prehispanic times. Upon the conquest of Mexico, this garrison was defeated in November 1521, after the fall of Tenochtitlan by Gonzalo de Sandoval.

During the colonial period the area was of little interest due to the rapid depopulation, a small number of prehispanic religious buildings remain unnoticed and therefore unharmed. While the postclassical pyramid of Castillo de Teayo is well known and frequently visited, probably took visitors from this site to Huatusco, Veracruz. This may be due to site name confusion, because the place where this site is located, Santiago Huatusco, is about 70 km (43 mi) south-east from the city Huatusco also known as Hustusco de Chicuellar. In addition, access to the small settlement of Santiago Huatusco, where the site is located, is rather cumbersome.

== Background ==
The prehispanic history of Veracruz is complex. It was inhabited primarily by four native cultures. The Huastecos and Otomis occupied the north, while the Totonacs resided in the north-center. The Olmecs, one of the oldest cultures in the Americas, became dominant in the southern part of Veracruz.

Remains of these past civilizations can be found in archeological sites such as Pánuco, Castillo de Teayo, El Zapotal, Las Higueras, Quiahuiztlán, El Tajín, Cempoala, Tres Zapotes and San Lorenzo Tenochtitlán.

The first major civilization in the territory of the current state is that of the Olmecs, a civilization with roots in the previous Archaic and Formative societies on the Gulf Coast and in the Isthmus of Tehuantepec. The Olmecs settled in the Coatzacoalcos River region and it became the center of Olmec culture. The main ceremonial center here was San Lorenzo Tenochtitlán. Other major centers in the state include Tres Zapotes in the city of Veracruz and La Venta in Tabasco. The culture reached its height about 2600 years ago, with its best-known artistic expression being the colossal stone heads. These ceremonial sites were the most complex of that early time period. For this reason, many anthropologists consider the Olmec civilization to be the mother culture of the many Mesoamerican cultures that followed it. By 300 BCE, this culture was eclipsed by other emerging civilizations in Mesoamerica.

Another major group was the Totonacas, who have survived to the present day. Their region, called Totonacapan, is centered between the Cazones River and the Papaloapan River in the north of the state. Pre-Columbian Totonacas lived from hunting fishing and agriculture, mostly of corn, beans, chili peppers and squash. This is also the native region of the vanilla bean. Clay sculptures with smiling faces are indicative of this culture. The major site is El Tajin, located near Papantla, but the culture reached its apogee in Cempoala (about five miles (8 km) inland from the current port of Veracruz), when it was conquered by the Aztecs. When the Spaniards arrived in 1519, the territory was still home to a population of about 250,000 people living in fifty population centers and speaking four Totonac dialects. 25,000 were living in Cempoala alone.

The Huastecas are in the far north of the Veracruz and extend into parts of Tamaulipas, Hidalgo, San Luis Potosí, Querétaro and Puebla. The language and agricultural techniques of these people and the Maya are similar; however, only a few buildings and ceramics remain from the early Huasteca culture. This culture also reached its peak between 1200 and 1519, when it was conquered by the Spanish.

During the 15th and very early 16th century, the Aztecs came to dominate much of the state and divided it into the tributary provinces of Tochtepec, Cuetlaxtlan, Cempoallan, Quauhtochco, Xalapan, Misantla, and Tlatlauhquitepec. The Aztecs were interested in the areas vegetation and crops such as cedars, fruit, cotton, cacao, corn, beans and vanilla. However, the Totonacs chafed under Aztec rule, with Aztec rulers from Axayacatl to Moctezuma II having to send soldiers to quell rebellions. The Huastecs were subjugated more successfully by the Aztecs and relegated to the provinces of Atlan and Tochpan.

=== Toponymy ===
Huatusco or Guatusco, is a deformation of the Nahuatl words Cuauh-tuch-co: cuahuitl; tree, Tuchtli; rabbit, Co; in: “in the place of the rabbit tree”. Natives called “Cuauhtochtli” to a squirrel type living in the trees.

== History ==
The 16th-century town of San Antonio Otlaquiquiztla, belonged to the ancient province of Cuauhtochco, whose capital was Santiago Huatusco (today Carrillo Puerto). In time the name Otlaquiquixtla was lost, becoming San Antonio. Since it belonged to the noted province, it was then called San Antonio Huatusco. The region was originally part of the Totonacapan región occupied by the Totonacs, subsequently changed hands over to the Olmeca-Xicallanca. Around 1454 CE, a son of Netzahualcoyotl conquered the region, including Otlaquiquixtla.

== The site ==
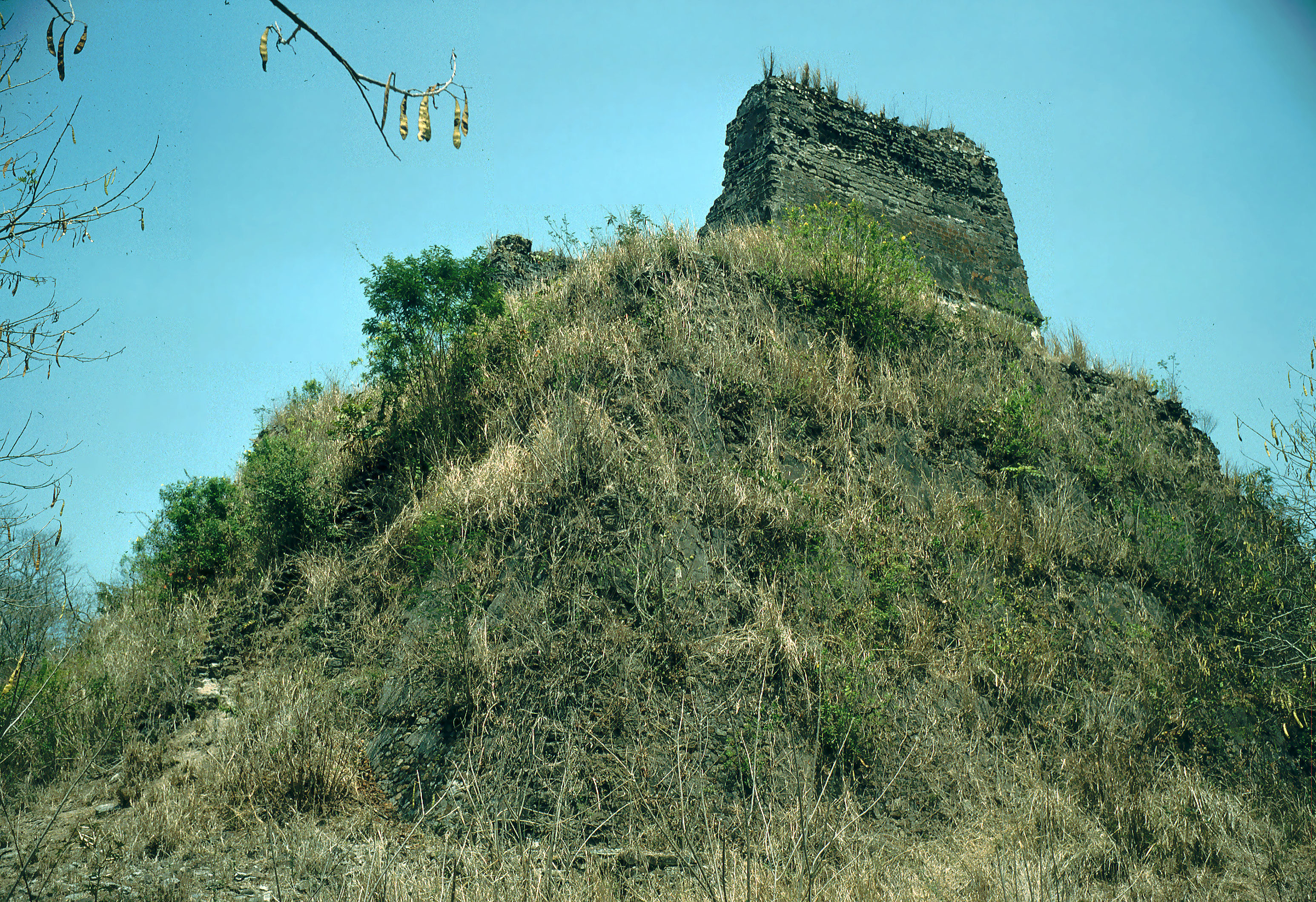
Side view of the Huatusco pyramid

Over 100m above the bed of Atoyac River are the ruins on the northern shore. Access from the South is blocked by a well-preserved walls made from round river stones. The site surface is divided into two sections. In the larger northern side, are several largely destroyed buildings and terraces.

The section is dominated by the central pyramid, a four-stage building, with a low platform to the west side.

This structure is certainly the best preserved Temple of late postclassical Mesoamerica. A wide, slightly above the actual body of the pyramid is an excellent stairway; it leads to the top of the pyramid platform. There seems to be about 52 steps.

The remarkably large and well-preserved temple buildings, whose walls measure 7–8 meters while the wall with the wide entrance located at the western side almost completely misses its upper half, probably because the wooden door beams are missing.

The walls are horizontally divided: the walls are perpendicular to a height of approximately 2.3 meters, then, on a small ledge the walls slope slightly inwards. On a higher cornice rectangular strip, almost covering the entire upper third of the wall is a recess with a niche frieze depicting a “sky full of stars".

Much like in Castillo de Teayo, the Interior floors were divided. Huatusco has three roof levels. The lowest level at 2.50 m high is a trend, narrow exposed wooden beams formed a ceiling from east to west, with walls resembling a brick groove. In the middle of the edges, were wooden support beams deeply anchored into the side walls, but also resting on brick pillars projecting from the side walls. The beams were at least twice supported by wooden or brick pillars because of the length of the room. The second level was also formed by parallel beams at intervals of about 1 meter of exposed wooden beams that were embedded in the sidewall. Remains of these beams are still numerous in the wall openings. Also, there was a beam which ran from the center to the north and southeastern side. The third level in turn consisted of a structure probably formed by exposed wooden beams. There are no remains of these beams. Also on this level, which probably had a stuccoed finishing, the side walls continued to the roof to provide lateral support. The second and third floors rooms were not as high as those in the first floor. Whether they had a specific reason or served only to achieve an optical illusion is uncertain.
