= Abasolo (surname) =

Abasolo is a Basque surname reflecting a person who lived on or near land owned by the Church; it originates from words meaning "priest" (abas) and "meadow" (solo). Notable people with the surname include:

- Alejandro Abasolo (born 1997), Mexican footballer
- Garbiñe Abasolo (born 1964), Spanish beauty pageant winner
- Mariano Abasolo (1783–1816), Mexican revolutionary
- Paul Abasolo (born 1984), Spanish footballer
- Rodrigo Abasolo (born 1963), Chilean rower
- José Antonio Abásolo Álvarez (born 1947), Spanish archaeologist and University professor
