= José Alejandro Llanas =

Mexican politician

- Born: 24 June 1978 (age 47); Río Bravo, Tamaulipas, Mexico
- Occupation: Politician
- Political party: PAN

José Alejandro Llanas Alba (born 24 June 1978) is a Mexican politician affiliated with the National Action Party (PAN). In the 2012 general election, he was elected to the Chamber of Deputies to represent Tamaulipas's 3rd district during the 62nd session of Congress.
