= Abasolo Municipality =

Abasolo Municipality may refer to several municipalities in Mexico:

- Abasolo Municipality, Coahuila
- Abasolo Municipality, Guanajuato
- Abasolo Municipality, Nuevo León
- Abasolo Municipality, Tamaulipas
