= Tomás Gloria Requena =

Mexican politician

- Born: 7 March 1971 (age 55); Aguascalientes, Aguascalientes, Mexico
- Occupation: Politician
- Political party: PRI, PVEM

Tomás Gloria Requena (born 7 March 1971) is a Mexican politician. At different times he has been affiliated with both the Institutional Revolutionary Party (PRI) and the Ecologist Green Party of Mexico (PVEM) and has represented both in Congress.

In the 2006 general election he was elected to a plurinominal seat in the Chamber of Deputies for the PRI (60th Congress), and in the 2021 mid-terms he was elected for the 3rd district of Tamaulipas on the PVEM ticket (65th Congress).
