= Tammapul =

Ruins in Mexico

Tammapul (Huastec: "Place of Mist") is a Pre-Columbian ruin in Tamaulipas, Mexico attributed to the Huastec civilization. It is located 8 kilometers southeast of the city of Tula, and sits by the shores of the Tula lagoon. Tammapul is believed to be a Huastec settlement, but 35,000 ceramic remains found on-site suggest a simultaneous connection to the Río Verde culture from the neighboring San Luis Potosí.

== History ==
As a town, Tammapul reached its zenith during the Epi-Classic period, from 600-900 AD. The archeological zone was first documented by Abraham Ortelius in his 1570 map of La Huasteca. In 1836, Toribio de la Torre described the place in his Description of the great road of Tula, Tamaulipas. Experts conclude that Tammapul was forcefully stripped of valuable materials in the 18th and 19th centuries, be it in the form of building materials, ceramics, art and more. In 1830, University of Texas researchers conducted the first official exploration of the site. In 1950, San Luis Potosi historian Joaquín Meade visited the region, crucially drawing scholarly interest to the area. In 1980, the historian Octavio Herrera Pérez, in conjunction with local residents, carried out extensive excavations and surrounded the pyramid with barbed fencing to prevent future desecration. Researchers from the National Institute of Anthropology and History continue to carry out excavations of Tammapul to this day.

== Description of the site ==
Out of three circular constructions connected by paved roads, Tammapul's most outstanding structure is "El Cuizillo," known also as the Tula Pyramid. This semi-conical building is 12 meters tall and consists of three superimposed floors. The base has a diameter of 41 meters and is made of carved and polished stone, and its second level is characterized by horizontal stones erupting from its exterior. El Cuizillo's third floor, also referred to as its center or nucleus, is a cylindrical body made of limestone. Though El Cuizillo's exact architecture is unrepeated among Mesoamerican ruins, its circular base can be seen in Guachimontones, Cuicuilco, Tzintzunzan and nearby El Sabinito. Likewise, El Cuizillo's protruding features recur in Tula and parts of Teotihuacan. Seeing this, Tammapul may have served as a crossroads of Mesoamerican culture, with its architecture thus reflecting a diverse range of influences. In the Huastec culture, round pyramids were typically associated with the wind god Ehecatl, offering one explanation for the misty connotations of Tammapul's etymology.

== See also ==
- La Huasteca
- Mesoamerican architecture
- Archaeology in Mexico
