= Jesús Humberto Martínez =

Mexican politician

- Born: 31 December 1956 (age 69); Matamoros, Tamaulipas, Mexico
- Education: UANL
- Occupation: Politician
- Political party: PRI

Jesús Humberto Martínez de la Cruz (born 31 December 1956) is a Mexican politician affiliated with the Institutional Revolutionary Party (PRI). In the 2003 mid-terms, he was elected to the Chamber of Deputies to represent Tamaulipas's 3rd district during the 59th session of Congress.
