= Edgardo Melhem Salinas =

Mexican politician

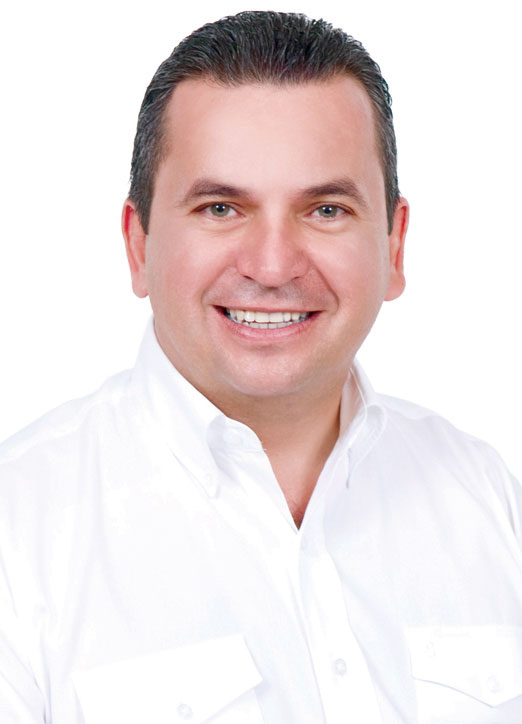
- Born: 14 August 1969 (age 57); Río Bravo, Tamaulipas, Mexico
- Occupation: Politician
- Political party: PRI
- Spouse: María Teresa Cantú Hinojosa

Edgardo Melhem Salinas (born 14 August 1969) is a Mexican politician from the Institutional Revolutionary Party (PRI). He has been elected to Congress for Tamaulipas's 3rd district on two occasions: in the 2009 mid-terms (61st Congress), and in the 2015 mid-terms (63rd Congress).

== Life ==
In 1992, Melhem graduated from the Universidad de Monterrey with a law degree; while studying, he presided over the PRI's Revolutionary Youth Front in Río Bravo, and he also headed the U de M's Association of Law School Students. He immediately went on to preside over Grupo México Nuevo A.C. in Tamaulipas, and in 1994, he became a private secretary for a federal deputy. He would remain around, but not in, the Chamber of Deputies, being an unused alternate deputy in the 57th and 58th sessions of Congress and primarily working with the Tortilla Subsidy Trust and the state Secretariat of Social Development.

In 2005, after a gap of several years, Melhem returned to the state SEDESOL, heading its department of programming and social compromise. He also served as an unused alternate deputy to the LIX Legislature of the Congress of Tamaulipas, which met between 2005 and 2007, and as a state- and national-level political councilor within the PRI. Between 2007 and 2009, Melhem directed the program Unidos Avanzamos Más in the state.

In 2009, after two terms as an alternate federal deputy, voters elected Melhem to his own seat in the federal Chamber of Deputies for the 61st Congress. He presided over the Special Commission for the Cuenca de Burgos and also sat on commissions dealing with Social Development and Hydraulic Resources. In early 2013, several months after the end of his term, he went back to the SEDESOL in Tamaulipas, this time as a federal delegate.

In January 2015, nearly two years after being named to the position, Melhem resigned from Sedesol in order to seek a return to the Chamber of Deputies, and that June, voters in the third district returned him to San Lázaro for the 63rd Congress in 2015; not only did the PRI sweep the eight districts of Tamaulipas in the election, but Melhem took home the second-highest vote total of all of the federal deputies up for election in the country's 300 districts. He serves on three commissions: Urban Development and Land Use, Hydraulic Resources, and Agriculture and Irrigation Systems.
