= Omeheira López Reyna =

Mexican politician

- Born: 16 March 1969 (age 57); Tamaulipas, Mexico
- Education: Universidad Valle del Bravo
- Occupation: Politician
- Political party: PAN

Omeheira López Reyna (born 16 March 1969) is a Mexican politician from the National Action Party (PAN). In the 2006 general election, she was elected to the Chamber of Deputies to represent Tamaulipas's 3rd district during the 60th session of Congress.
