= Abasolo, Tamaulipas =

Coordinates: 24.0558662°N 98.3733439°W

Abasolo
- City
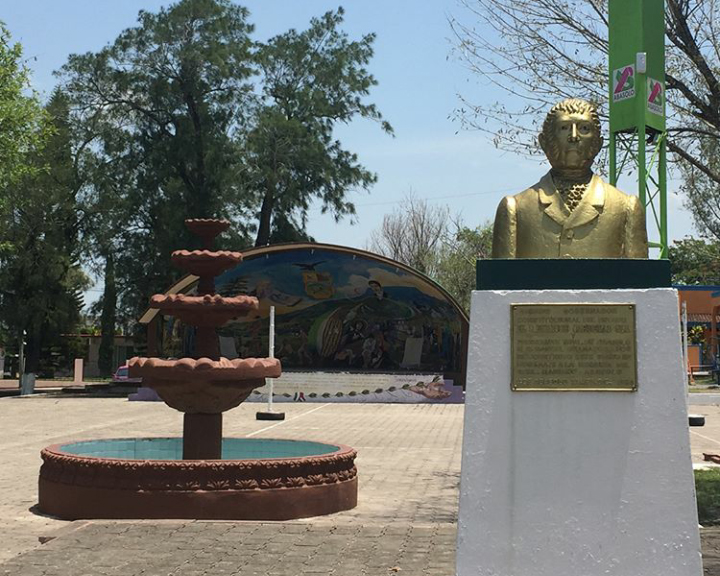
- Plaza Cívica in Abasolo, Tamaulipas

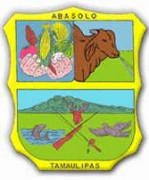
- Coat of arms

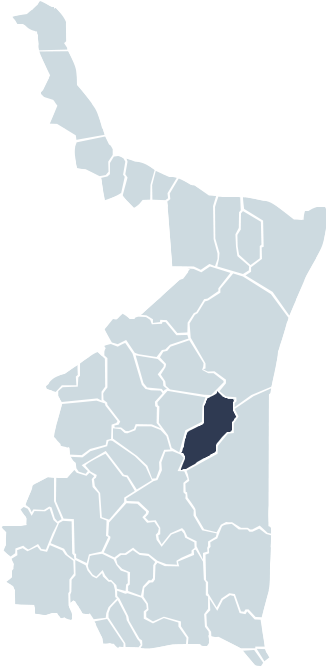
- Map of Abasolo, Tamaulipas
- Country: Mexico
- State: Tamaulipas
- Municipality: Abasolo

Government
  - Pdte. municipal: yazmín saldada ([Morena (partido politico)])

Area
  - Total: 1,960.46 km^{2} (756.94 sq mi)
- Elevation: 70 m (230 ft)

Population
  - Total: 11,862
  - Density: 6.0506/km^{2} (15.671/sq mi)

Abasolo is a city located in the Mexican state of Tamaulipas. It is the seat of Abasolo Municipality.

== Geography ==
=== Climate ===
Climate data for Abasolo, Tamaulipas (1991–2020)
Month	Jan	Feb	Mar	Apr	May	Jun	Jul	Aug	Sep	Oct	Nov	Dec	Year
Record high °C (°F)	36.0 (96.8)	42.0 (107.6)	43.0 (109.4)	45.0 (113.0)	44.5 (112.1)	45.0 (113.0)	42.5 (108.5)	43.0 (109.4)	44.0 (111.2)	39.5 (103.1)	38.5 (101.3)	39.5 (103.1)	45.0 (113.0)
Mean daily maximum °C (°F)	23.7 (74.7)	26.5 (79.7)	29.5 (85.1)	32.5 (90.5)	34.7 (94.5)	35.8 (96.4)	35.7 (96.3)	36.4 (97.5)	33.8 (92.8)	31.2 (88.2)	27.5 (81.5)	24.5 (76.1)	31.0 (87.8)
Daily mean °C (°F)	16.7 (62.1)	19.1 (66.4)	22.1 (71.8)	25.3 (77.5)	28.1 (82.6)	29.4 (84.9)	29.2 (84.6)	29.7 (85.5)	27.9 (82.2)	24.8 (76.6)	20.7 (69.3)	17.6 (63.7)	24.2 (75.6)
Mean daily minimum °C (°F)	9.7 (49.5)	11.6 (52.9)	14.8 (58.6)	18.1 (64.6)	21.4 (70.5)	23.0 (73.4)	22.8 (73.0)	23.0 (73.4)	22.0 (71.6)	18.4 (65.1)	14.0 (57.2)	10.7 (51.3)	17.5 (63.5)
Record low °C (°F)	−2.5 (27.5)	−2.5 (27.5)	0.5 (32.9)	5.5 (41.9)	10.0 (50.0)	2.5 (36.5)	17.5 (63.5)	2.5 (36.5)	12.0 (53.6)	2.0 (35.6)	0.0 (32.0)	−6.0 (21.2)	−6.0 (21.2)
Average precipitation mm (inches)	29.0 (1.14)	21.7 (0.85)	24.9 (0.98)	43.7 (1.72)	78.6 (3.09)	88.4 (3.48)	72.0 (2.83)	93.3 (3.67)	147.1 (5.79)	81.5 (3.21)	22.9 (0.90)	22.6 (0.89)	725.7 (28.57)
Average precipitation days (≥ 0.1 mm)	5.2	3.7	4.2	4.6	5.0	5.9	5.1	5.7	10.2	6.5	4.1	4.1	64.3
Source: Servicio Meteorologico Nacional
