= El Sabinito =

Pre-Columbian ruin in Tarnaulipas, Mexico

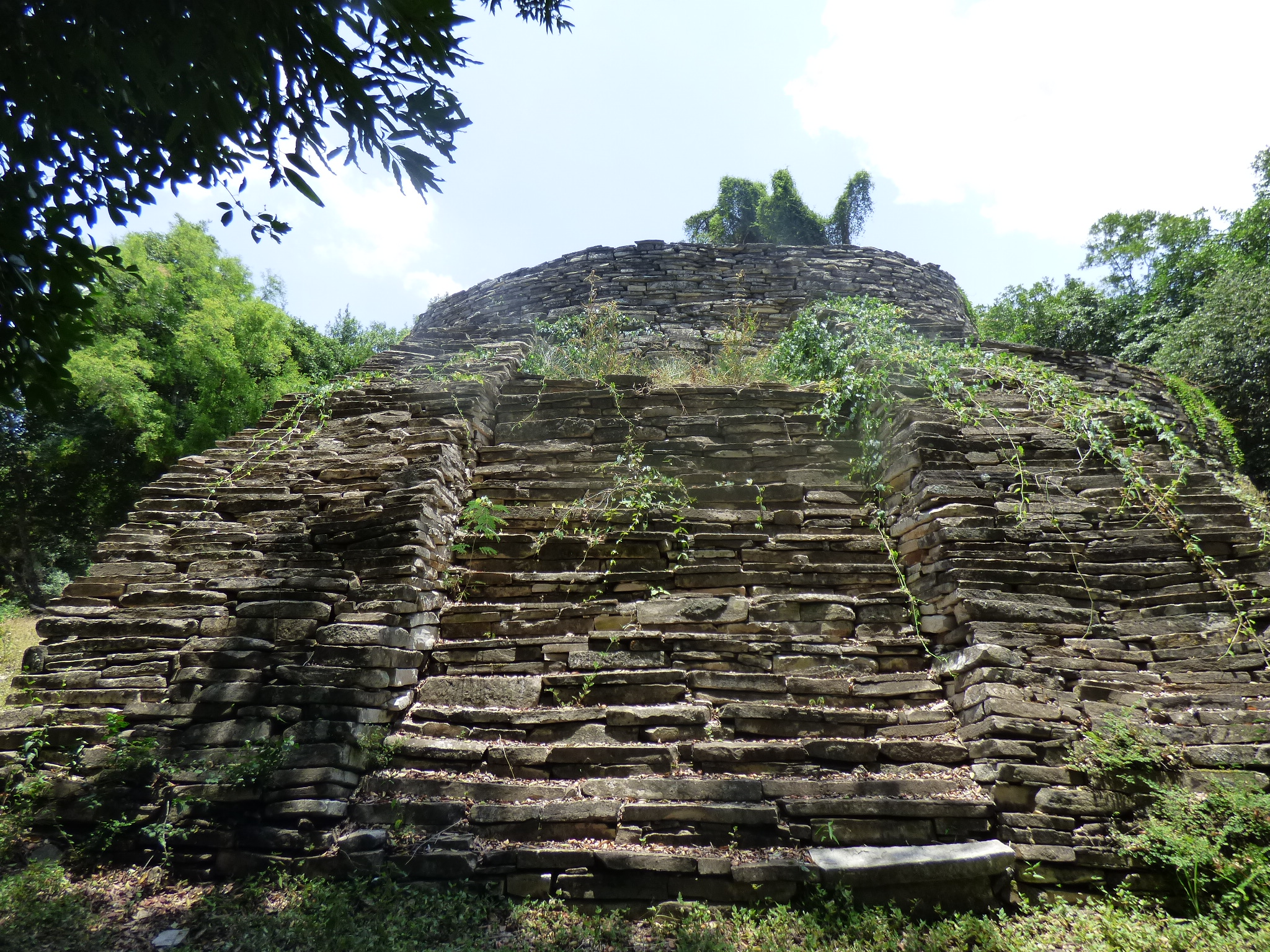
- Interactive map of El Sabinito
- 23°37′40″N 98°22′6.4″W
- Periods: Classic to Post-Classic
- Cultures: Huastec
- Location: Soto la Marina Municipality, Tamaulipas, Mexico
- Region: Sierra de Tamaulipas

History
- Built: 200 CE
- Abandoned: 1300 CE

Site notes
- Discovered: 1987

El Sabinito is a Pre-Columbian ruin associated with the Huastec civilization. Located in the Mexican state of Tamaulipas, El Sabinito is approximately 25 kilometers southwest and 96 kilometers east of the modern-day cities Soto la Marina and Ciudad Victoria. Alongside the Balcon de Montezuma, El Sabinito marks the northernmost boundary of Mesoamerican civilization.

== History and description ==
El Sabinito was discovered in 1987 by Aureliano Medina in a region of Tamaulipas characterized by its virgin, tropical jungles and suffocating humidity. Today, this region lies within the municipality of Soto la Marina and north of the Sierra de Tamaulipas.

Compared to other Huastec ruins in Tamaulipas, such as the Balcon de Montezuma and the Pyramid of Tammapul, El Sabinito was the most urbanized and culturally significant. The Huastecs of Tamaulipas originally belonged to the Mayan culture but migrated northward to the present-day state around 1300 BCE. Upon their arrival, the immigrant Huastecs made a concerted effort to preserve their Mayan identity. They resisted assimilation for approximately one thousand years until finally integrating aspects of their nomadic neighbors' cultures in 300 CE. While archaeological remains indicate that human activity around the Soto la Marina River sprung up as early as 10,000 BCE, the Huastecs' construction and occupation of El Sabinito only began in 200 CE. El Sabinito showed signs of decline around 1000 CE, and all signs of life disappeared in 1300 CE, suggesting that the site was abandoned. The reason for this abandonment remains to be discovered.

El Sabinito was a town of more than 600 foundations. Based on the discovery of 600 residential structures out of those foundations, Mexican archaeologists approximate that El Sabinito had a population of over 2,500 inhabitants at its peak.

Due to its placement atop the tallest of a group of irregular hills and the presence of formidable terraces and embankments, El Sabinito may have functioned as a strategic point of observation which could monitor the movement of enemy nomadic tribes. As such, the makeup of El Sabinito suggests that it may have served as a military and political stronghold as well as a cultural and residential hub.

== Architecture ==
All of the buildings within El Sabinito are very well preserved. As mentioned above, excavations of the site performed by INAH resulted in the finding of more than 600 foundations built on terraces, corridors, and plazas arranged symmetrically in a manner that demonstrates fairly advanced knowledge of architecture.

The site can be divided into two sectors based on its two principal plazas.

=== Plaza 1 ===
The first plaza is marked by its northmost location and the sizable edifices which flank it, which are the largest within El Sabinito. Outstanding among these constructions is the circular, eight-meter-high pyramid, with slabs of limestone jutting out of its sides like the arms of a windmill. This particularly conical style of pyramid has been associated with the worship of Ehecatl, the Huastec god of wind which was later appropriated by the Aztecs. Opposite to this pyramid is a ceremonial altar measuring 2 meters by 6 meters with an aberrantly uneven shape.

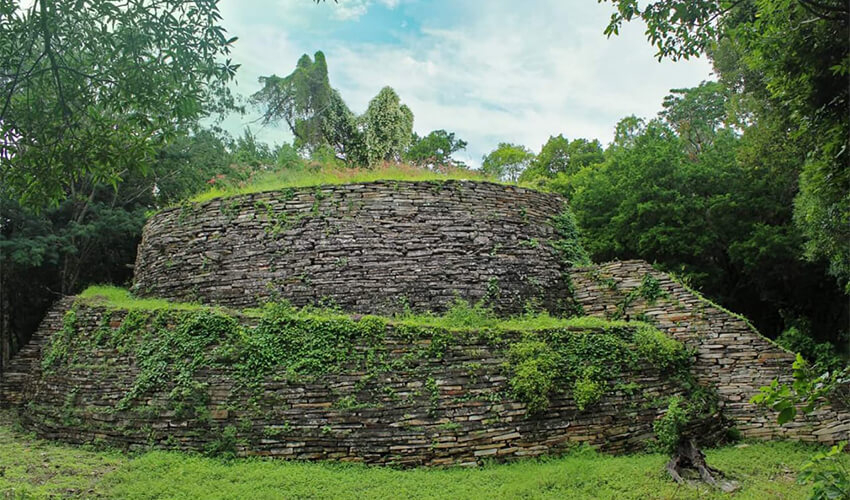
An alternate angle of El Sabinito's largest pyramid in Plaza 1

=== Plaza 2 ===
Two large circular twin buildings that start from the hillside stand out, linked together by a wall with a staircase to reach a ceremonial plaza, which is also accessed by means of terraces staggered by other buildings that surround it.

== See also ==
- La Huasteca
- Mesoamerican architecture
- Archaeology in Mexico
- Tammapul
