= Sierra de Tamaulipas =

Mountain range in Mexico

- Location within Mexico

Geography
- Location: Tamaulipas, Mexico
- Range coordinates: 23°15′N 98°24′W

The Sierra de Tamaulipas is an isolated, semi-tropical mountain range in the Mexican state of Tamaulipas. Its highest point is 1,260 m (4,130 ft). There are no cities or towns in the Sierra and the small population is largely agricultural. The higher elevations of the Sierra have forests of oak and pine, contrasting with the semi-arid brush that dominates at lower altitudes. Several archaeological sites establish that the Sierra de Tamaulipas was the northern outpost of the agricultural Mesoamerican peoples of eastern Mexico.

On 5 December 2016, the Sierra de Tamaulipas was declared a "Protected Natural Area" by the government of Mexico. The Protected Area has a core area of 38,285 hectares (94,600 acres) and a buffer zone containing 269,992 hectares (667,160 acres).

== Geography ==
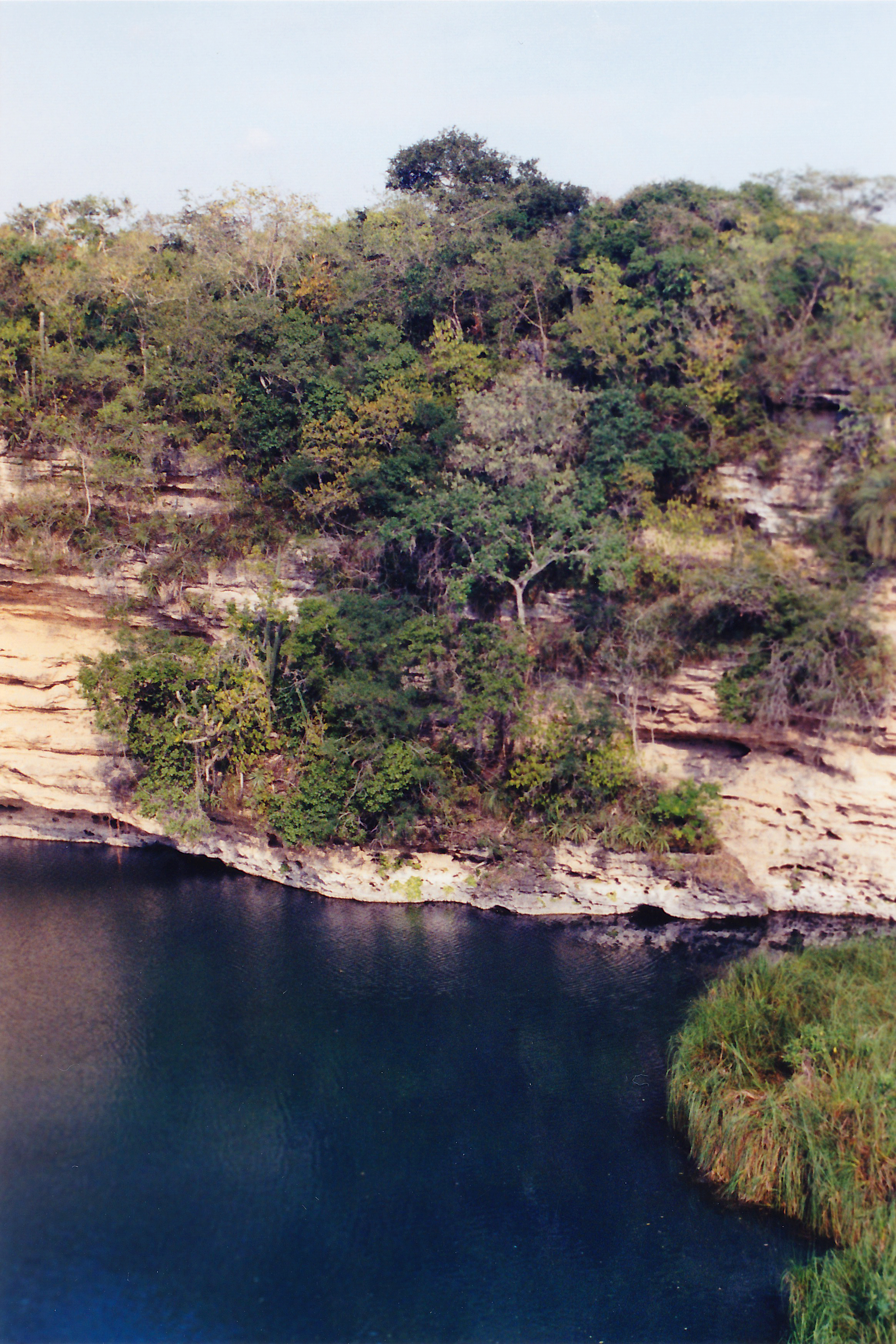
El Zacatón with free floating grass island (lower right), Municipality of Aldama, Tamaulipas, Mexico

The Sierra de Tamaulipas is about 110 kilometres (68 mi) north to south and 64 kilometres (40 mi) east to west at its widest point in the southern part of the range. The Sierra is located between 23 and 24 north latitude and 98 and 99 west longitude and has an estimated area of 3,339 square kilometres (1,289 sq mi). Elevation ranges from 300 to 1,260 metres (980 to 4,130 ft).

The Sierra de Tamaulipas has the characteristics of a Sky island—isolated from the Sierra Madre Oriental and rising high enough to have cooler and wetter conditions than the adjacent land at lower elevations. The area surrounding the Sierra at elevations below 300 metres (980 ft) is vegetated primarily by a tropical thorn forest (Tamaulipan mezquital). The Sierra, with higher rainfall and lower temperatures, has three major vegetation types. Tropical deciduous forest (Veracruz moist forests) is found at elevations of 300 to 700 metres (1,000 to 2,300 ft). The average height of this closed-canopy forest is about 7.5 metres (25 ft). Montane scrub is found in dry areas between 600 and 900 metres (2,000 and 3,000 ft) elevation. This vegetation type consists of low thickets and savanna. Huisache is a common shrub. Pine-oak forests found at elevations of greater than 800 metres (2,600 ft) are an island of temperate forest in the ecoregion of Sierra Madre Oriental pine-oak forests. In areas undisturbed by agriculture and logging, vegetation at the higher altitudes can be luxuriant with many ferns. In the lowland southeast of the Sierra, in the municipality of Aldama, Tamaulipas is a limestone karst area associated with the karstic areas of the Sierra de Tamaulipas, in which many caves and cenotes (water-filled sinkholes) are found, including Zacatón which is the deepest sinkhole in the world with a depth of 339 metres (1,112 ft). In 1994, cave-diving pioneer Sheck Exley died attempting to dive to the bottom of Zacatón.

No major highways nor rivers cross the Sierra, nor are there any towns or cities. The population is rural. Abundant small, clear waterways drain from the highest points of the Sierra outward in all directions.

== Climate ==
Precipitation in the Sierra de Tamaulipas ranges from about 710 millimetres (28 in) at the lowest elevations to more than 1,000 millimetres (39 in) at higher elevations. Most precipitation is in the summer between May and October, although winters are not as dry as in much of Mexico. Freezes are rare at lower elevations, but common in the temperate forests at higher altitudes. The climate of the hamlet of Santa Maria de los Nogales is typical of the higher elevations of the Sierra.

The climatic classification for Santa Maria under the Köppen Classification is Cwa, sub-tropical with hot summers and dry, warm winters. Under the Trewartha climate classification, the climate is Cwbl, sub-tropical with warm summers and dry, mild winters.

Climate data for Santa Maria de los Nogales, Tamaulipas. 23 12 29N, 98 21 30W, Elevation: 3,041 ft (927 m) (1950-2010)
Month	Jan	Feb	Mar	Apr	May	Jun	Jul	Aug	Sep	Oct	Nov	Dec	Year
Record high °C (°F)	36.0 (96.8)	35.0 (95.0)	40.0 (104.0)	41.0 (105.8)	43.5 (110.3)	41.0 (105.8)	39.0 (102.2)	37.0 (98.6)	37.0 (98.6)	32.5 (90.5)	36.0 (96.8)	33.5 (92.3)	43.5 (110.3)
Mean daily maximum °C (°F)	19.7 (67.5)	21.4 (70.5)	25.1 (77.2)	27.3 (81.1)	28.8 (83.8)	28.6 (83.5)	27.9 (82.2)	27.8 (82.0)	26.7 (80.1)	24.6 (76.3)	22.4 (72.3)	20.0 (68.0)	25.0 (77.0)
Daily mean °C (°F)	13.8 (56.8)	14.8 (58.6)	17.9 (64.2)	20.1 (68.2)	22.3 (72.1)	22.8 (73.0)	22.6 (72.7)	22.2 (72.0)	21.3 (70.3)	19.0 (66.2)	16.9 (62.4)	14.5 (58.1)	19.0 (66.2)
Mean daily minimum °C (°F)	7.8 (46.0)	8.3 (46.9)	10.8 (51.4)	13.0 (55.4)	15.8 (60.4)	16.9 (62.4)	17.3 (63.1)	16.6 (61.9)	16.0 (60.8)	13.5 (56.3)	11.3 (52.3)	9.0 (48.2)	13.0 (55.4)
Record low °C (°F)	−5 (23)	−5.5 (22.1)	−2.0 (28.4)	1.5 (34.7)	5.5 (41.9)	6.0 (42.8)	7.5 (45.5)	7.5 (45.5)	6.0 (42.8)	0.0 (32.0)	−5.0 (23.0)	−9.0 (15.8)	−9.0 (15.8)
Average precipitation mm (inches)	28.0 (1.10)	16.0 (0.63)	20.0 (0.79)	37.0 (1.46)	79.0 (3.11)	135.0 (5.31)	140.0 (5.51)	158.0 (6.22)	199.0 (7.83)	87.0 (3.43)	27.0 (1.06)	39.0 (1.54)	965.0 (37.99)
Average precipitation days (≥ 0.1 mm)	5.8	4.1	3.2	4.4	7.2	8.8	9.4	11.1	11.7	7.4	5.9	6.2	85.2
Source: Weatherbase: Santa Maria de los Nogales, Tamaulipas.

== Pre-Hispanic cultures ==
Due to greater precipitation than the surrounding lowlands, the Sierra de Tamaulipas was probably the northernmost area of eastern Mexico in which the cultivation of maize was practiced during pre-Hispanic times. Northward in the semi-arid brushlands extending into Texas lived the nomadic non-agricultural peoples collectively called Coahuiltecans.

Archaeologist Richard MacNeish found evidence of cultivation of maize in the Sierra de Tamaulipas dating from 2,500 BC which suggests a transition in culture from nomadic hunter-gathering to a more settled lifeway. From 300 to 550 AD, several settlements in the Sierra de Tamaulipas comprised the northern outpost of the Mesoamerican Huastec culture. The Sierra settlements featured villages built around public squares and small pyramids, indicating a centralized and possibly theocratic government. The archaeological ruin of El Sabinito, about 13 miles (20 km) southwest of the city of Soto la Marina, is at the northern edge of the Sierra. El Sabinito may have consisted of 600 houses with a population of 1,500 at its peak. It was abandoned in about 1300 AD, possibly because climatic changes made agriculture less feasible. Archaeologists speculate that the inhabitants reverted to a hunting-gathering means of subsistence.

The first European to visit the coastal area adjacent to the Sierra was Francisco de Garay in 1523. Garay found maize cultivation up to about the Tropic of Cancer. From there northward lived hunter-gatherers who, according to Garay's men, were numerous and warlike on the lower stretches of the Soto La Marina River.

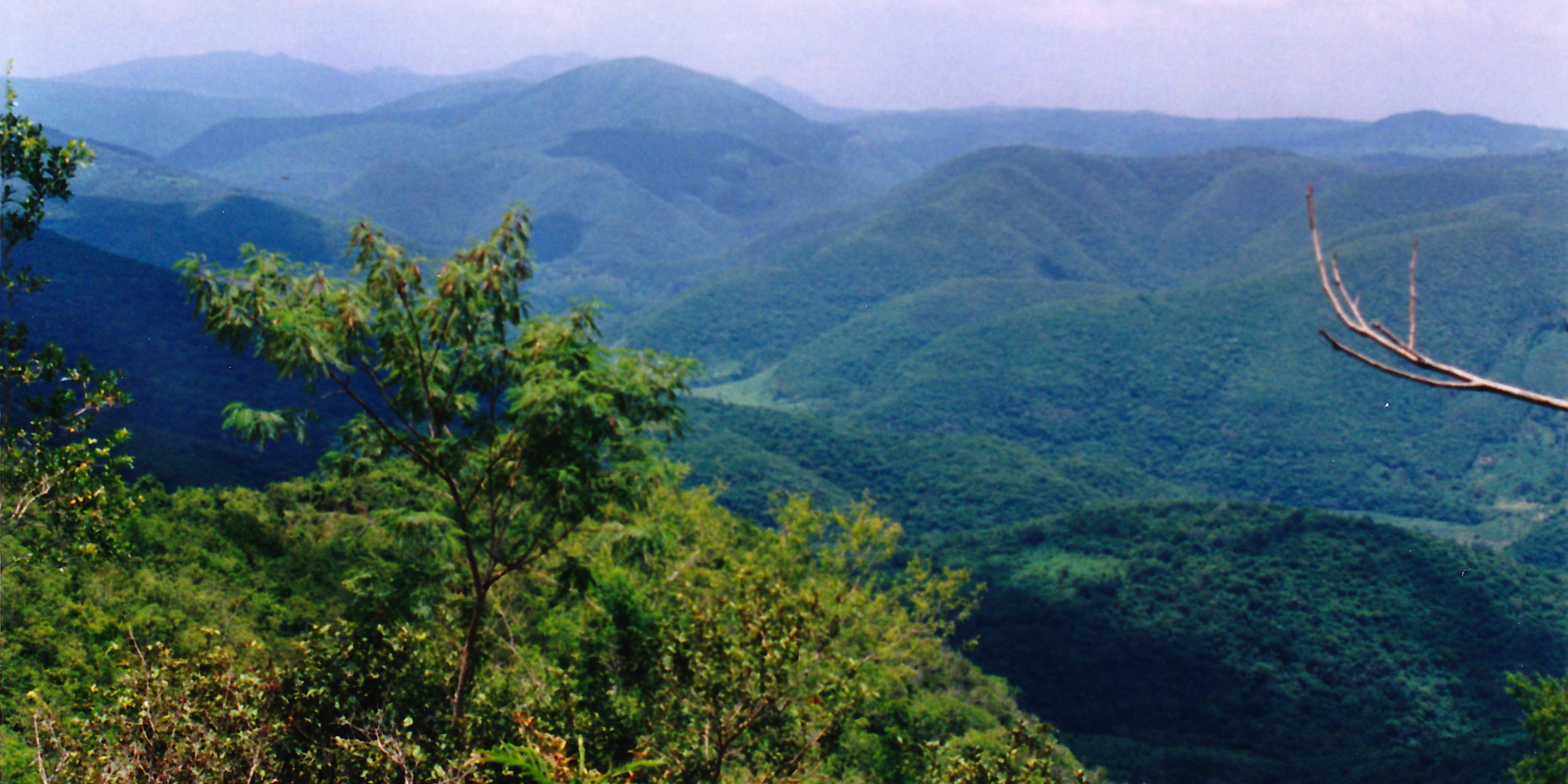
Sierra de Tamaulipas, Municipality of Aldama, Tamaulipas, Mexico

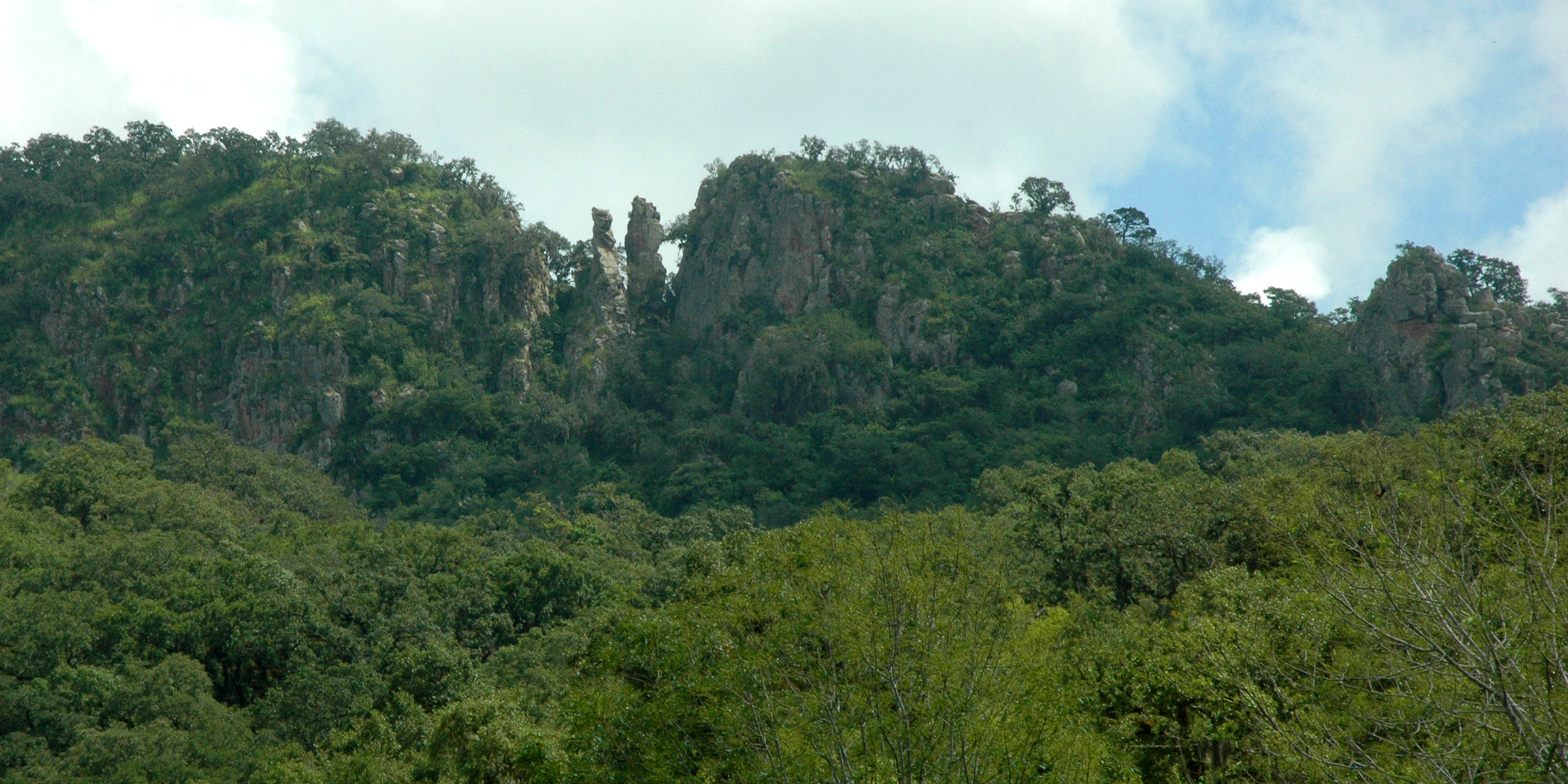
View of karstic formations in the Sierra de Tamaulipas, Municipality of Llera, Tamaulipas, Mexico.
