= Huastec civilization =

Pre-Columbian civilization of Mesoamerica

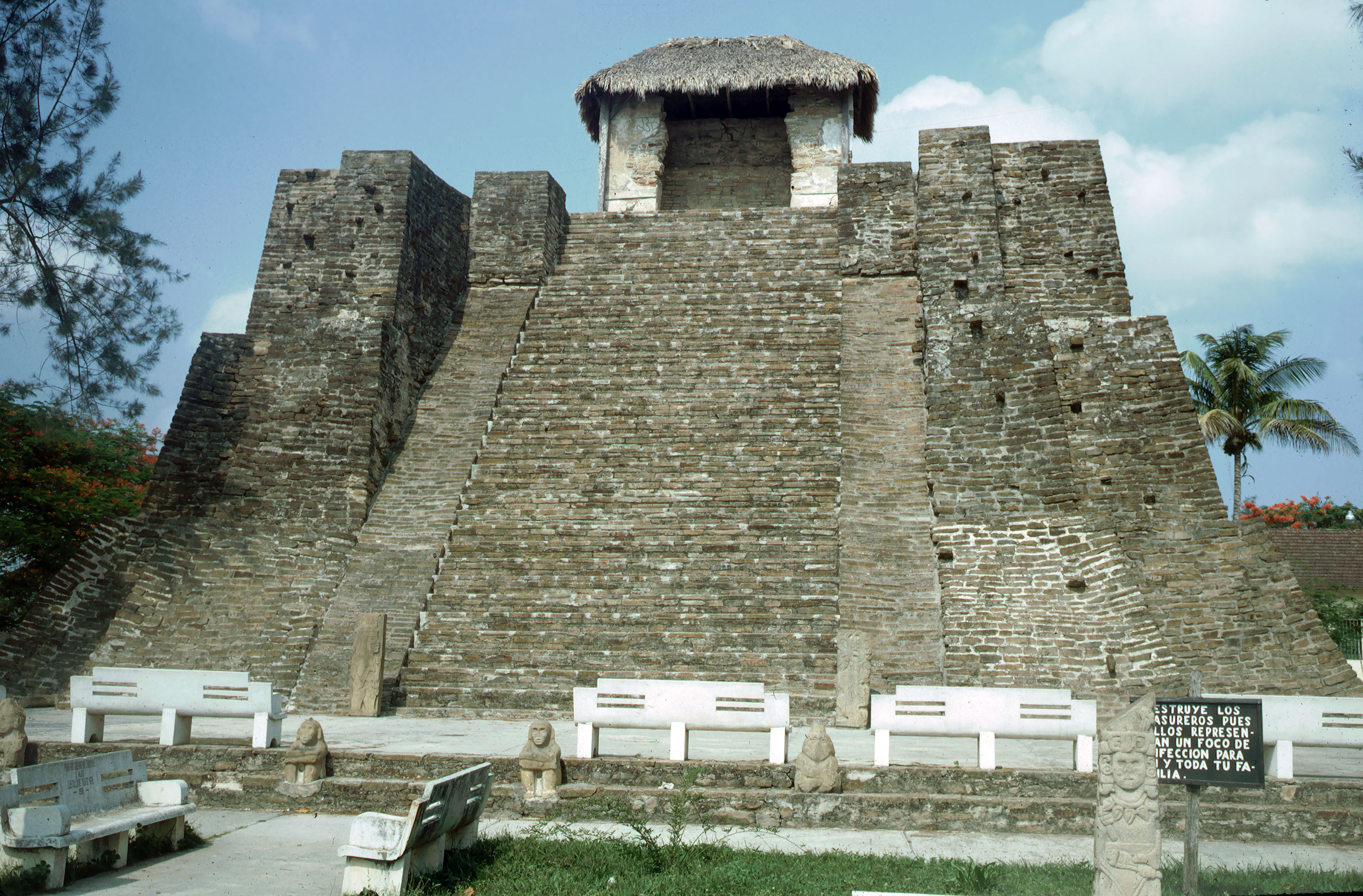
Late Postclassic Huastec temple at Castillo de Teayo

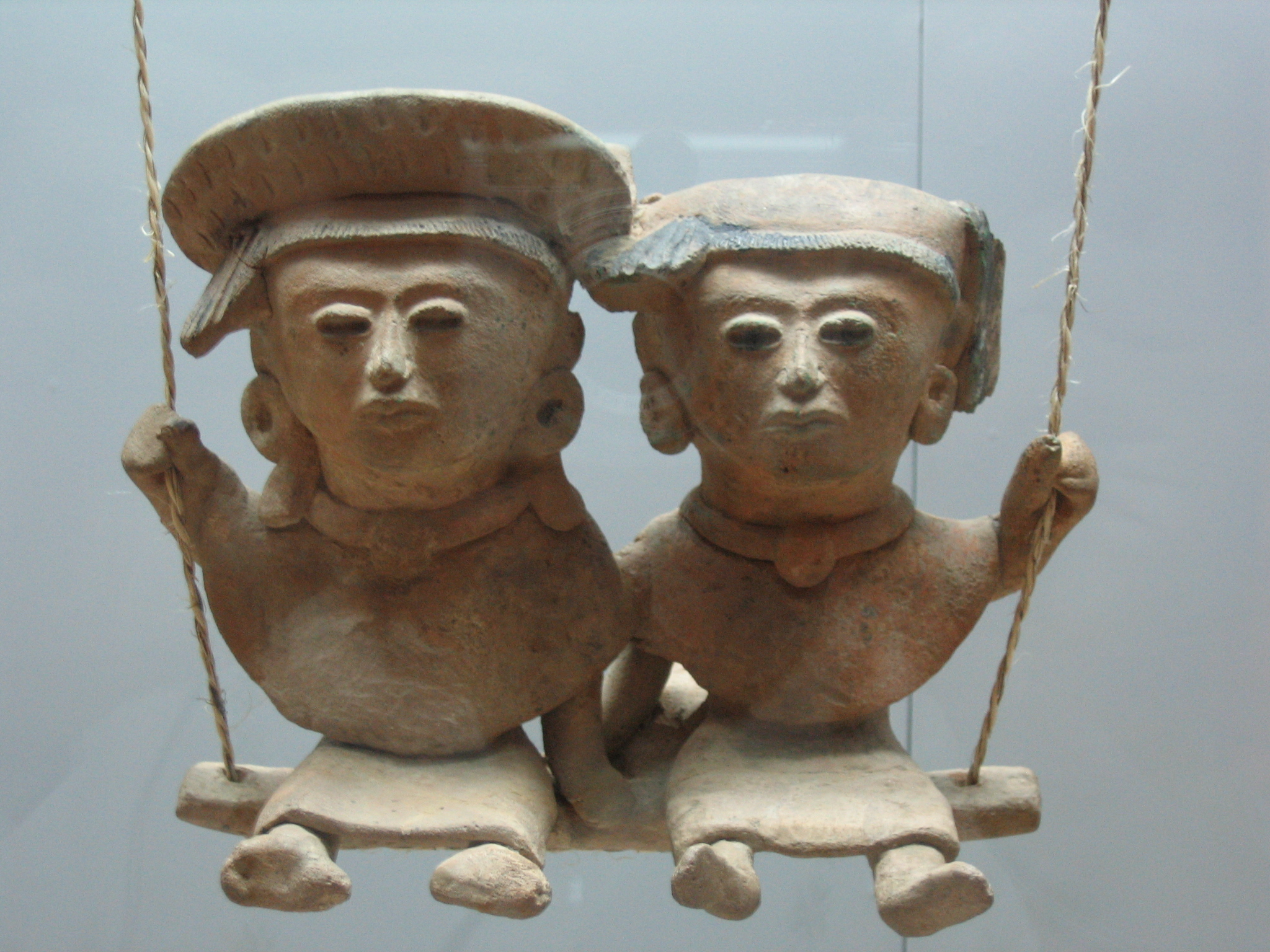
Classic period sculpture in the Museum of Anthropology in Xalapa, Veracruz

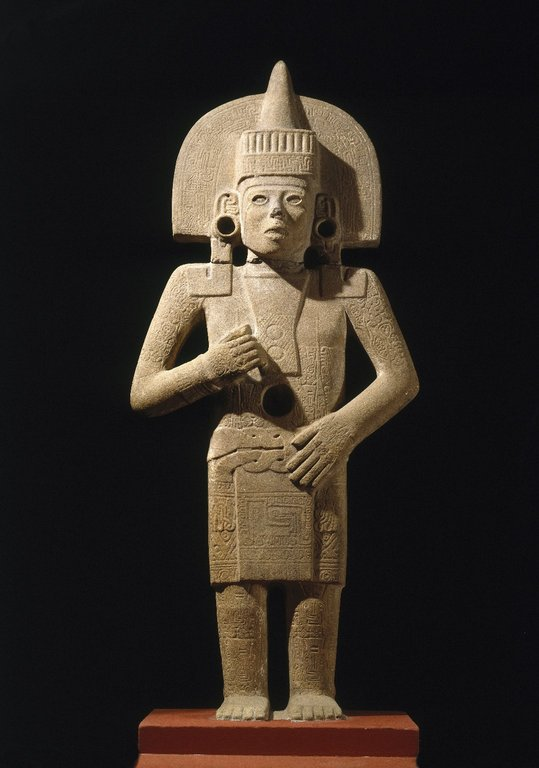
Early Postclassic life-death figure at the Brooklyn Museum

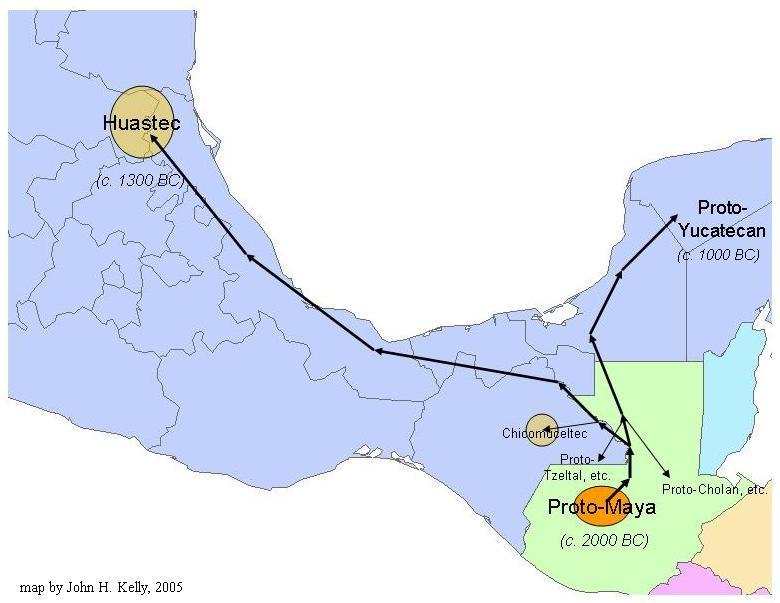
Approximate routes and dates of the proto-Huastec and other Maya-speaking groups

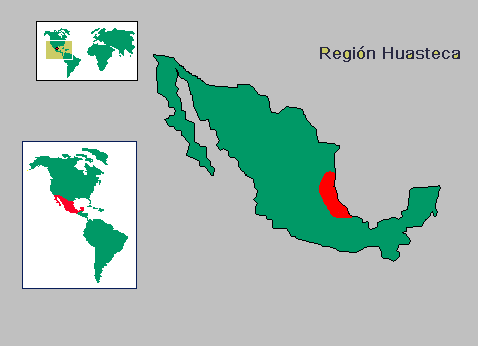
Map of the Huastec region on the Gulf coast of Mexico

The Huastec civilization (sometimes spelled Huaxtec or Wastek) was a pre-Columbian civilization of Mesoamerica, occupying a territory on the Gulf coast of Mexico that included the northern portion of Veracruz state, and neighbouring regions of the states of Hidalgo, Querétaro, San Luis Potosí, and Tamaulipas. The Huastec people were an early offshoot of the Maya peoples that migrated northwards.

Surviving remains from the Huastec civilization include several large archaeological sites, a well-preserved temple, and a large amount of stone sculpture. By the Late Postclassic (c. AD 1200–1521), the Huastecs had developed metallurgy and were producing copper alloys. The Aztec Empire conquered the Huastec region around the 15th century, and probably demanded tribute payments.

== Culture ==
The Huastec civilization is poorly studied, although there is a large body of stone sculpture, and a well-preserved Late Postclassic temple at Castillo de Teayo. In the Late Postclassic, the Huastec region was a centre for metallurgy that included the production of copper alloys. The Huastec region was conquered by the Aztecs, probably in the 15th century, and it is likely that the Huastecs paid tribute to the Aztec Empire.

Notable Huastec archaeological sites include Vista Hermosa, with 120 platform mounds, Platanito with 150 platform mounds, and Tamtok, a large Late Postclassic site. The Huastecs were not politically unified, and were organised into a number of competing city-states.

== Origins ==
The Huastec are an isolated offshoot of the Maya. Although the Huastec language is a Mayan language, the Huastec civilization is not considered to be a part of the Maya civilization. They did not employ the Maya writing system, and there are no known pre-Spanish Conquest Huastec documents. Generally, the Huastecs are considered to have split from the main branch of the Maya around 2000 BC, in the Preclassic period, with this early separation accounting for the differences between Huastec and Maya culture. Several studies have argued a more recent split from the mainstream Maya in the Postclassic, based on archaeological and linguistic evidence. In the latter case, it is proposed that the Huastec migrated from the central Maya region as a result of the Classic Maya collapse (c. 830–950 AD).

== Religion ==
The Huastecs placed an emphasis on worshiping Ehecatl, the Mesoamerican god of wind. The Huastecs built characteristically circular pyramids in his honor, some of which still comprise a distinguishing aspect of many Huastec ruins today. When the Huastecs were subjugated by the Aztec Empire, Aztec religious leadership recognized the sacred status of Ehecatl in Huastec society and thus added the wind deity to their own pantheon.

Tlazolteotl, possibly called Ix Cuinim in the Huastec language, was another important deity. Archaeological studies have also uncovered a god represented as an old man who is the lord of the earth, thunder, the year, and drunkenness. He was considered the ancestor of the Huastec and was able to become young again through intoxication. Other deities found include representations of Quetzalcoatl with characteristics of Ehecatl, and a young god who is generally male (showing commonalities with Xochipilli and Mixcoatl). A solar cult also existed.

== See also ==
- El Sabinito
- Balcon de Montezuma
- Las Flores
- Tamuin
