= Soto la Marina =

Town in Tamaulipas, Mexico

Coordinates: 23°46′N 98°13′W

- Municipality
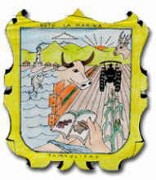
- Coat of arms

- Location in Mexico Soto la Marina (Mexico)
- Country: Mexico
- State: Tamaulipas
- Demonym: (in Spanish)
- Time zone: UTC−6 (CST)

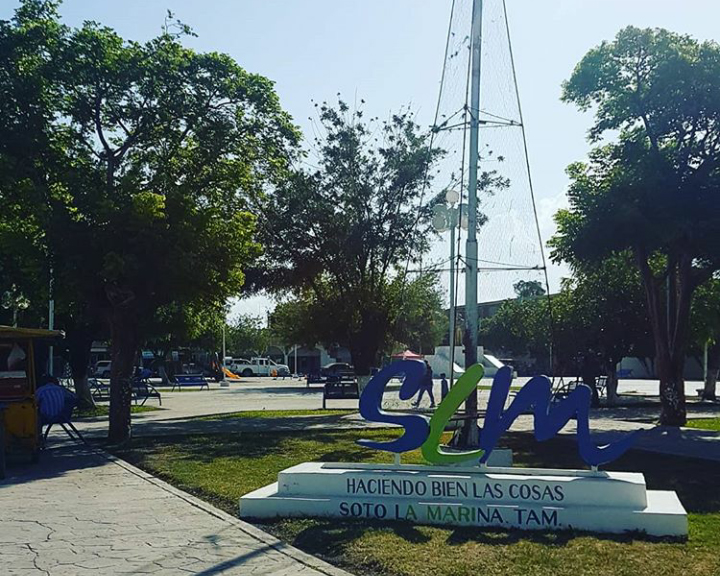
Park in Soto la Marina, Tamaulipas.

Soto la Marina is a town in Soto la Marina Municipality located in the Mexican state of Tamaulipas. It was directly hit by Hurricane Alex in 2010. It is located on the banks of the Soto la Marina river, just up river from the small ocean port of La Pesca, and downriver from Ciudad Victoria, the capital of the State of Tamaulipas. 180 miles South of Brownsville, Texas, it is accessible from there via a highway in approximately 3 hours driving time.

The municipality includes some of the mountain range called the Sierra de Tamaulipas.

== Geography ==
=== Climate ===
Soto La Marina has a semi-arid climate (Köppen climate classification BSh) that closely borders on a humid subtropical and a tropical savanna climate. Winters are mild and short with the average maximum temperature being 24 °C (75.2 °F) and the minimum temperature being 10 °C (50.0 °F) in the coldest month, January. However, temperatures can go over 40 °C (104.0 °F), despite that these are the coolest months. Precipitation during this time of the year is low; nonetheless, winters tend to be foggy and cloudy. Frosts are extremely rare. Summers are long, hot, and humid with June being the warmest month, with an average temperature of 29.6 °C (85.3 °F).It tends to be sunnier during the summer season, averaging 13–14 clear days and 14–15 partly cloudy days compared with only 8–10 clear days from December to February. Precipitation is low, averaging 699.5 millimetres (28 in) with the months June to October seeing an increase in precipitation. The record high was 48.3 °C (118.9 °F) on April 29, 1953, and the record low was −7.7 °C (18.1 °F) on December 12, 1957.

Climate data for Soto La Marina (1951–2010)
Month	Jan	Feb	Mar	Apr	May	Jun	Jul	Aug	Sep	Oct	Nov	Dec	Year
Record high °C (°F)	37.5 (99.5)	40.5 (104.9)	43.0 (109.4)	48.0 (118.4)	45.4 (113.7)	45.7 (114.3)	42.0 (107.6)	43.5 (110.3)	42.6 (108.7)	38.5 (101.3)	39.0 (102.2)	37.0 (98.6)	48.0 (118.4)
Mean daily maximum °C (°F)	24.3 (75.7)	27.1 (80.8)	30.1 (86.2)	32.7 (90.9)	35.2 (95.4)	36.2 (97.2)	36.0 (96.8)	36.7 (98.1)	34.3 (93.7)	31.8 (89.2)	28.2 (82.8)	24.6 (76.3)	31.4 (88.5)
Daily mean °C (°F)	17.3 (63.1)	19.6 (67.3)	22.4 (72.3)	25.3 (77.5)	28.3 (82.9)	29.6 (85.3)	29.1 (84.4)	29.5 (85.1)	27.9 (82.2)	24.9 (76.8)	21.4 (70.5)	17.9 (64.2)	24.4 (75.9)
Mean daily minimum °C (°F)	10.3 (50.5)	12.1 (53.8)	14.8 (58.6)	18.0 (64.4)	21.5 (70.7)	23.0 (73.4)	22.2 (72.0)	22.2 (72.0)	21.5 (70.7)	18.0 (64.4)	14.6 (58.3)	11.3 (52.3)	17.5 (63.5)
Record low °C (°F)	−2.5 (27.5)	1.0 (33.8)	−0.5 (31.1)	2.5 (36.5)	12.0 (53.6)	15.5 (59.9)	18.5 (65.3)	14.5 (58.1)	11.0 (51.8)	3.2 (37.8)	−1.5 (29.3)	−6.5 (20.3)	−6.5 (20.3)
Average precipitation mm (inches)	41.6 (1.64)	11.4 (0.45)	16.9 (0.67)	36.7 (1.44)	38.8 (1.53)	89.9 (3.54)	72.3 (2.85)	97.8 (3.85)	155.8 (6.13)	76.4 (3.01)	29.1 (1.15)	32.8 (1.29)	699.5 (27.54)
Average precipitation days (≥ 0.1 mm)	4.6	3.0	3.0	3.8	4.2	6.4	5.9	5.6	7.8	5.3	4.0	4.2	57.8
Average relative humidity (%)	67	65	62	65	64	64	65	64	67	67	66	69	65
Mean monthly sunshine hours	160	173	208	220	257	252	302	266	204	214	152	162	2,570
Source 1: Servicio Meteorológico Nacional (humidity 1981–2000)
Source 2: Deutscher Wetterdienst (sun, 1961–1990) (Note: Station ID for Soto La Marina, Tamps. is 76499 Use this station ID to locate the sunshine duration)
