= Alejandro Abasolo =

Mexican footballer (born 1997)

Personal information
- Full name: Alejandro Abasolo Rodríguez
- Date of birth: July 13, 1997 (age 29)
- Place of birth: Mexico City
- Height: 1.69 m (5 ft 6 1/2 in)
- Position: Midfielder

Youth career
- 2012: Puebla
- 2015–2016: Alebrijes de Oaxaca

Senior career*
Years	Team	Apps	(Gls)
2016	Alebrijes de Oaxaca	0	(0)
2016–2017	→ Belén (loan)	4	(0)
2018	Lobos BUAP	0	(0)
2019	Guadalupe	5	(0)

Managerial career
- 2022–2024: Monterrey (women) (Assistant)
- * Club domestic league appearances and goals as of January 2, 2021

Alejandro Abasolo Rodríguez (born 13 July 1997) is a former Mexican footballer who last played as a midfielder for Guadalupe F.C. on loan from Alebrijes de Oaxaca.
