= San Sebastián Abasolo =

- Municipality and town
- Location in Mexico
- Coordinates: 16°59′39.96″N 96°35′16.29″W
- Country: Mexico
- State: Oaxaca

Population (2005)
  - Total: 1,514
- Time zone: UTC-6 (Central Standard Time)

San Sebastián Abasolo is a town and municipality in Oaxaca in south-western Mexico. The municipality covers an area of km^{2}. It is part of the Tlacolula District in the east of the Valles Centrales Region. As of 2005, the municipality had a total population of .
