= Castillo de Teayo, Veracruz =

Castillo de Teayo
- Municipal seat
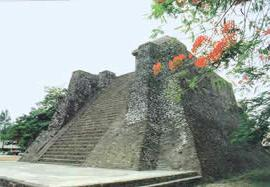
- Archaeological site

- Location in Mexico Castillo de Teayo (Veracruz)
- Coordinates: 20°45′0″N 97°38′0″W
- Country: Mexico
- State: Veracruz
- Region: Huasteca Baja
- Municipality: Castillo de Teayo
- Settled: pre-Conquest
- Modern settlement: 1870

Government
  - Federal electoral district: Veracruz's 2nd
- Elevation: 80 m (260 ft)

Population (2005)
  - Total: 4,159
- Time zone: UTC-6 (Zona Centro)
- Climate: Aw

Castillo de Teayo is a small town in the Mexican state of Veracruz. Located in the state's Huasteca Baja region, it serves as the municipal seat for the surrounding municipality of the same name.

In the 2005 INEGI Census, Castillo de Teayo reported a total population of 4,159.

== Name ==
"Teayo" comes from the Nahuatl te-ayo-k, which means "tortoise atop stone". This is a reference to the main pyramid of the nearby archaeological site known as the Castle of Teayo, a syncretic blend of the Toltec, Mexica, and Huastec cultures.
