= Castillo de Teayo (municipality) =

- Municipality
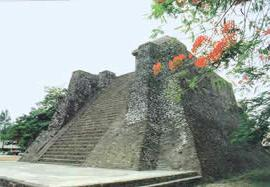
- Archaeological site

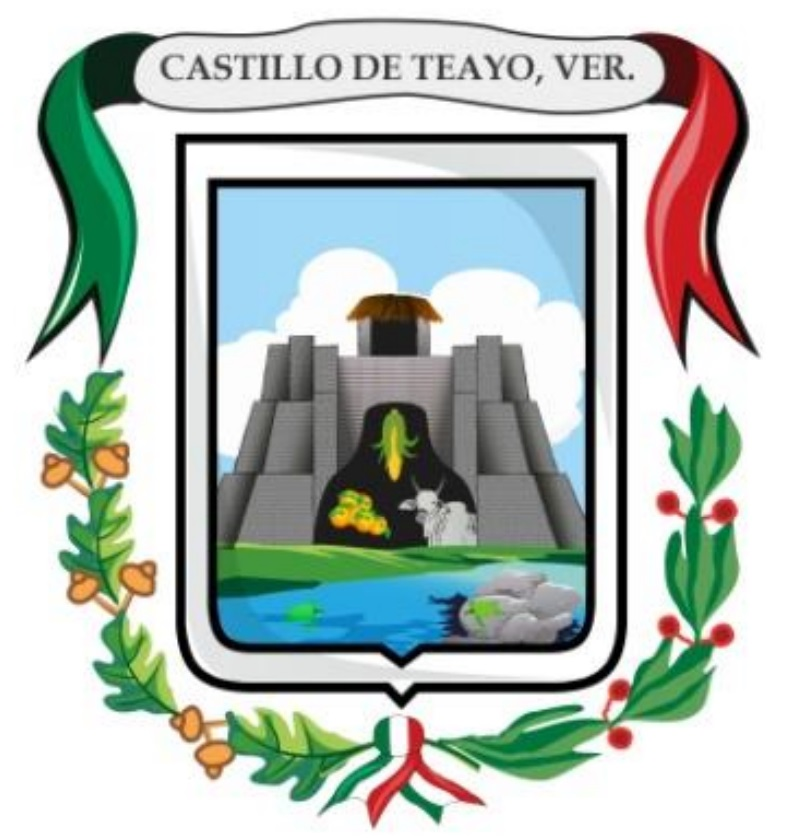
- Coat of arms

- Location within Veracruz Location within Mexico
- Coordinates: 20°45′0″N 97°38′0″W
- Country: Mexico
- State: Veracruz
- Municipal seat: Castillo de Teayo
- Municipality created: 13 December 1877

Government
  - Municipal President: Martin Rafael Rodríguez González (2008-10)
  - Federal electoral district: Veracruz's 2nd

Area
  - Total: 447.46 km^{2} (172.77 sq mi)
- Elevation: 80 m (260 ft)

Population (2005)
  - Total: 18,424
  - Density: 41.175/km^{2} (106.64/sq mi)
- Time zone: UTC-6 (Zona Centro)
- Website: Castillo de Teayo

Castillo de Teayo Municipality is a municipality of the Mexican state of Veracruz. It is located in the state's Huasteca Baja region. The municipal seat is the village of Castillo de Teayo.

In the 2005 INEGI Census, the municipality reported a total population of 18,424 (down from 19,335 in 1995), of whom 4,159 lived in the municipal seat. Of the municipality's inhabitants, 1,970 (10.52%) spoke an indigenous language, primarily Nahuatl.

The municipality of Castillo de Teayo covers a total surface area of 447.46 km².

== Name ==
"Teayo" comes from the Nahuatl te-ayo-k, which means "tortoise atop stone". This is a reference to the archaeological site known as the Castle of Teayo, a syncretic blend of the Toltec, Mexica, and Huastec cultures.

== Settlements ==
- Castillo de Teayo (municipal seat; 2005 population 4159)
- Mequetla (1614)
- La Guadalupe (1504)
- Teayo (1402)
- La Defensa (1117)
