= Soto la Marina Municipality =

Coordinates: 23.7680°N 98.2076°W

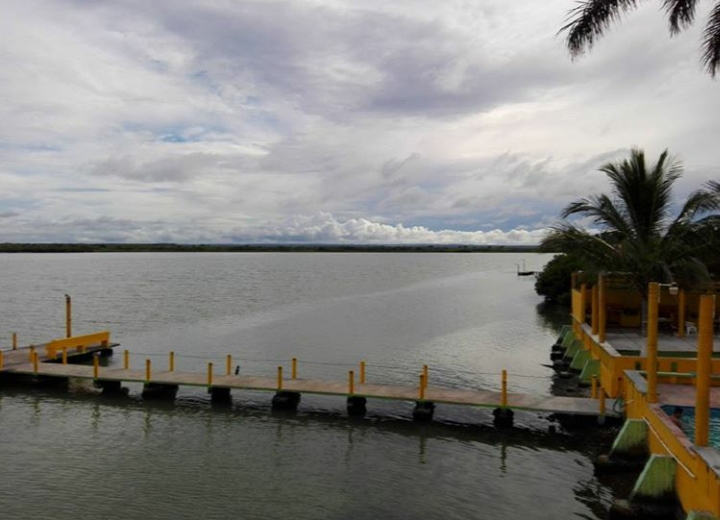

Soto la Marina Municipality is one of the municipalities of Tamaulipas. The seat is at Soto la Marina, Tamaulipas.

As of 2020, the municipality had a population of 23,673 people.
