= Abasolo Municipality, Tamaulipas =

Coordinates: 24°03′N 98°22′W

Abasolo
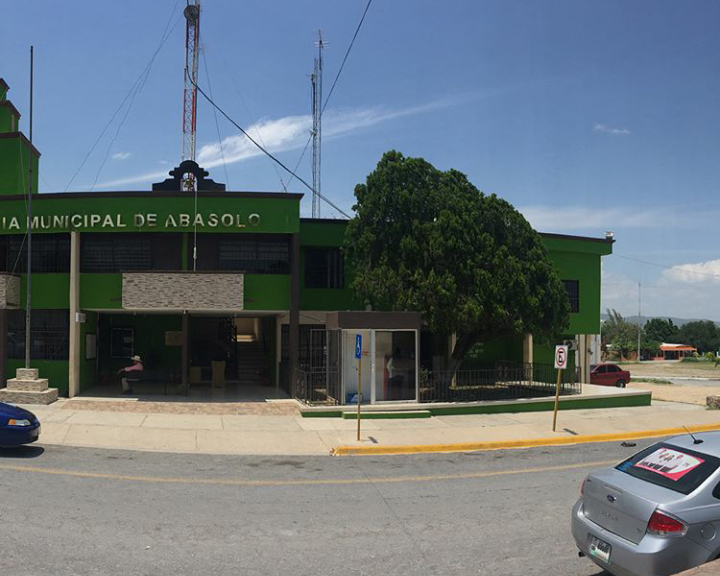
- Town hall
- Interactive map of Abasolo
- Country: Mexico
- State: Tamaulipas

Population (2020)
  - Total: 9,822

Abasolo Municipality is located in Tamaulipas, Mexico.
