= Castillo de Teayo (Mesoamerican site) =

Archaeological site in Veracruz, Mexico

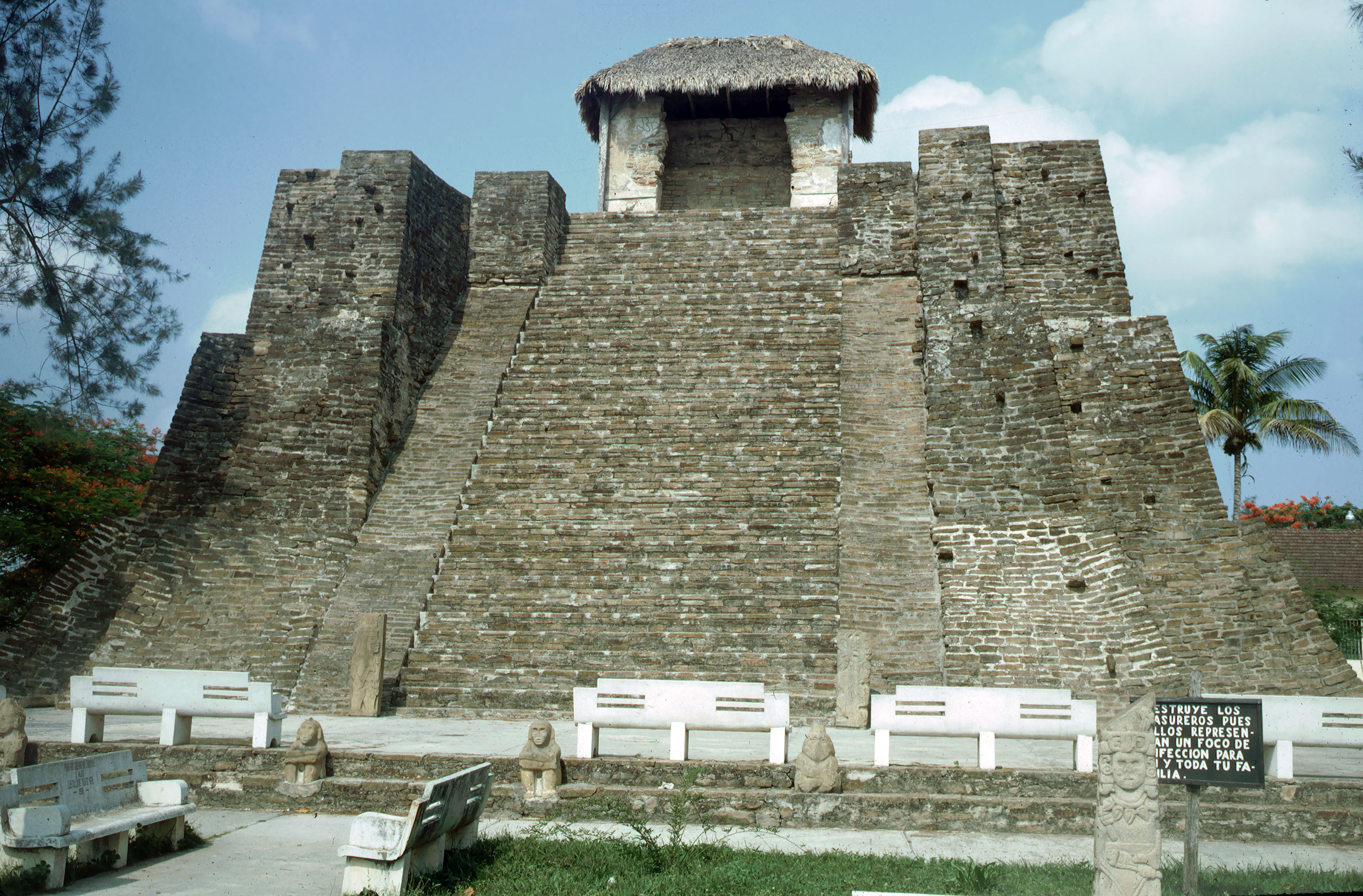
- 20°44′59″N 97°38′00″W
- Type: Archaeological site
- Cultures: Huastec
- Location: La Huasteca, Veracruz, Mexico

Castillo de Teayo is a prehispanic Mesoamerican archaeological site and Mesoamerican pyramid, located in the La Huasteca region in northern Veracruz, Mexico. The main access to the site is via Federal Highway 130 México-Tuxpan up to the city of Teayo, it belongs to the Huastec culture and it is estimated it was inhabited between the 10th and 12th centuries.

In the modern era the contemporary settlement of Castillo de Teayo developed around the ancient pyramid that the settlement and its municipality of Castillo de Teayo were named after.

In the Tuxpan Canvas, this place is represented by the Teayotlán glyph. According to one version, the name etymology comes from the Huastec language word teayo o teayoc, which means “on the stone turtle”.

Another official version of the name is that it comes from the Nahuatl word Teayok, Te-ayo-k “Turtle on stone”. The site received its current name because there is a temple or archaeological monument in the municipality, as the only remaining vestige of a large ancient city, a mixture of the Olmec and Huastec cultures. It used to be called Tzapotlán.

== Site history ==
This site was home to one of the ancient Huastec cities. Its occupation periods are calculated from the 10th to the 12th centuries, and during the Late Postclassic period it developed a strong Mexica influence. In the center of the town is a pyramidal-shaped building that preserves part of its entire structure, with a stairway and a structure that crowned the building, probably a temple, and it is one of the few buildings of this type remaining in the Mesoamerican area. Sculptures found in the surrounding area are kept in the small site museum. Their stylistic features depict phallic worship, very common in some cultural regions. More information is available in the small site museum which contains sculptures found during excavations of the city. Some of the sculptures that were found in the area characterized a cult-like phallic style, very popular in some ancient cultures.

This site combines various cultural traditions, first the Huastec (10th to 12th centuries), and the Aztec, in the late Postclassical. According to specialists, the architecture of the only remaining building is of Aztec filiation, although the village also had relationships with Toltec groups from the Mexican Plateau.

The Olmec-Huixtotin culture became the Cuexteca or Huastec culture. In relation to the Maya and Toltec societies, there was an important influence on the site sculptures. However, there is another version that says that the sculptural style corresponds to a Toltec occupation.

The Huastec culture developed south of the current states of Tamaulipas, north of Veracruz, east of San Luis Potosí and small areas of the states of Puebla, Querétaro and Hidalgo. Although this geographic-cultural regionalization has not been stable through time, Teayo Castle is included in this region.

== Structure – Castillo de Teayo ==
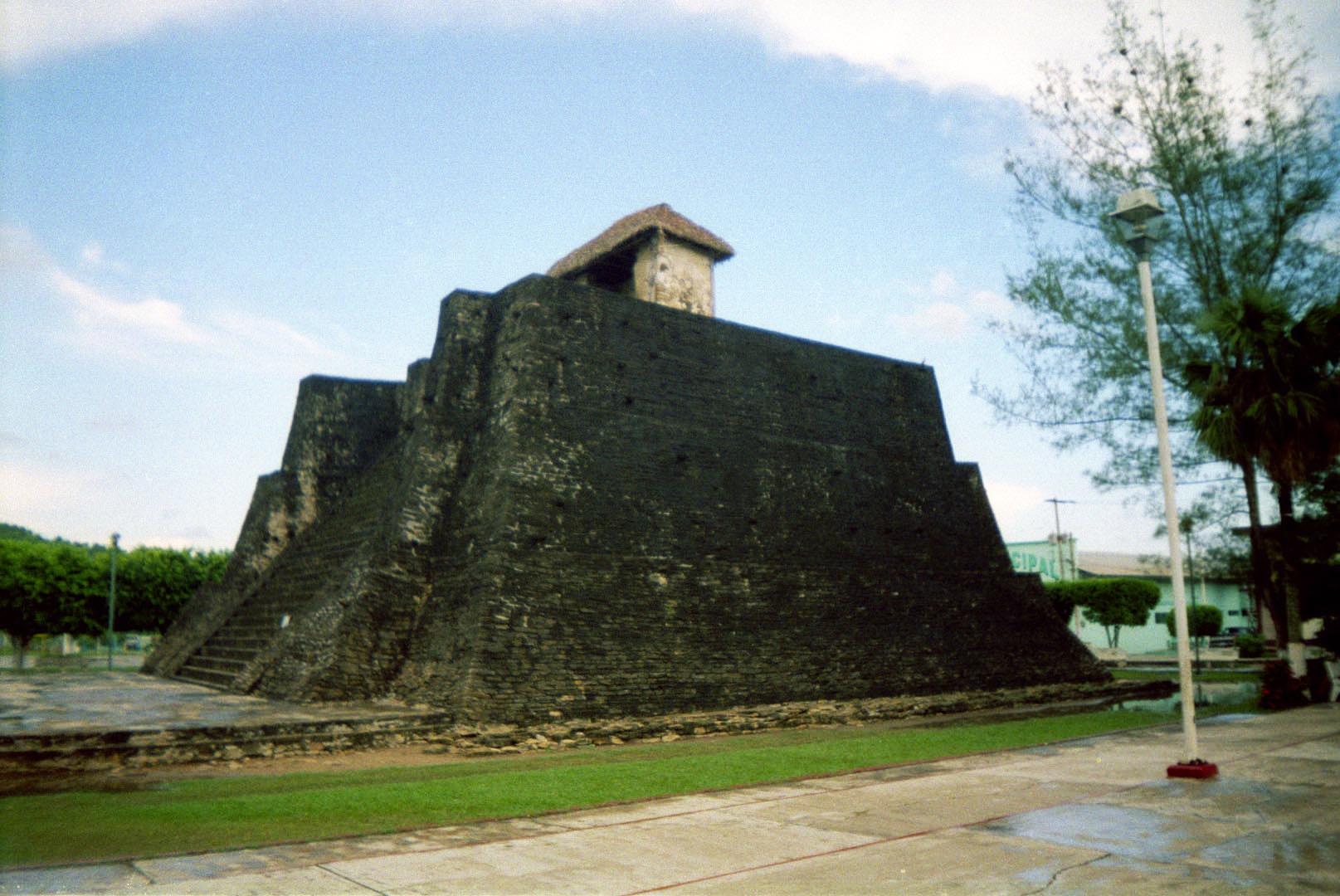
Castillo de Teayo

The Castillo de Teayo is a prehispanic pyramid of Toltec origin; its architectural and stylistic features reveal the influence of Huastec and Mexica cultures. The Castillo de Teayo is situated in a Valley, in the center of town and consists of three bodies, slightly inclined, separated by a landing. Its plant is square with sides of about 24 meters and height is more than 11 meters.

As an ornamental feature, it has a small flat molding, which runs all around its perimeter, at 1.40 meters high. Surrounding it were several sculptures of different size and style, which are currently at the Museum, along with other pieces from the site excavations.

The humidity has damaged the stucco and the archaeological jewel walls. The prehispanic Toltec pyramid with influence from the Huastec and Mexica cultures from the 15th century displays serious damages as a result of the neglect on the part of the National Institute of Anthropology and History. Municipality inhabitants are unhappy to see how the central pyramid and the ceremonial temple as the most archaeological asset in this area are affected by the lack of palm roofing which has failed to protect the priceless archaeological structure from water and moisture.

== Site museum ==
INAH informs that a site museum exists located at Pyramid Plaza w/o number. Downtown, Zip Code 92940, Castillo de Teayo, Veracruz.

The cultural heritage comprises pre-Hispanic objects from the Veracruz northern region, mainly Castillo de Teayo archeological site – mostly stone sculptures with representations of gods, animals, and human figures. During the visit more information is available over the ancient site inhabitants, their origin and history, as well as details of the exhibited articles.
