= Hurricane Gert =

Category 2 Atlantic and Pacific hurricane in 1993

Hurricane Gert Tropical Depression Fourteen-E
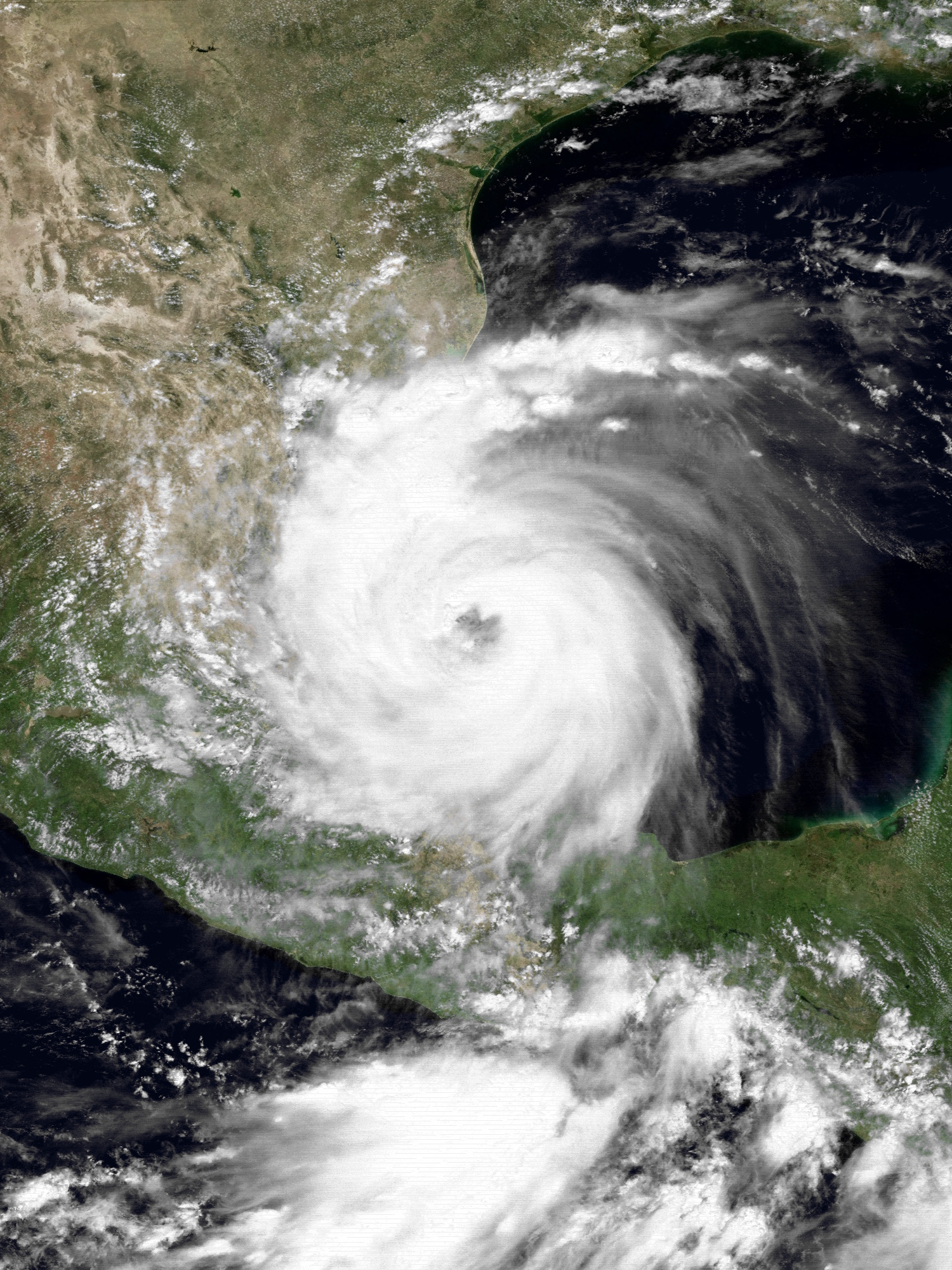
- Gert at peak intensity near landfall in Veracruz on September 20

Meteorological history
- Formed: September 14, 1993
- Dissipated: September 26, 1993

Category 2 hurricane
- 1-minute sustained (SSHWS/NWS)
- Highest winds: 100 mph (155 km/h)
- Lowest pressure: 970 mbar (hPa); 28.64 inHg

Overall effects
- Fatalities: 116
- Missing: 16
- Damage: $170 million (1993 USD)
- Areas affected: Costa Rica, Nicaragua, Honduras, El Salvador, Guatemala, Belize, Mexico
- IBTrACS
- Part of the 1993 Atlantic and Pacific hurricane seasons

Hurricane Gert was a large and deadly tropical cyclone that caused extensive flooding and mudslides throughout Central America and Mexico in September 1993. The seventh named storm and third hurricane of the annual hurricane season, Gert originated as a tropical depression from a tropical wave over the southwestern Caribbean Sea on September 14. The next day, the cyclone briefly attained tropical storm strength before moving ashore in Nicaragua and proceeding through Honduras. It reorganized into a tropical storm over the Gulf of Honduras on September 17, but weakened back to a depression upon crossing the Yucatán Peninsula. Once over the warm waters of the Bay of Campeche, Gert quickly strengthened into a Category 2 hurricane by September 20. The hurricane made a final landfall on the Gulf Coast of Mexico near Tuxpan, Veracruz, with peak winds of 100 mph (160 km/h). The rugged terrain disrupted the cyclone's structure; Gert entered the Pacific Ocean as a depression near the state of Nayarit on September 21, where it briefly redeveloped a few strong thunderstorms before dissipating at sea five days later.

Gert's broad wind circulation produced widespread and heavy rainfall across Central America through September 15–17. Combined with saturated soil following Tropical Storm Bret's passage a month earlier, the rain triggered widespread floods and mudslides that isolated thousands of people across numerous communities. In Costa Rica, blustery weather destroyed a national park and led to significant losses in the agricultural and tourism sectors. Much of the Mosquito Coast of Nicaragua and Honduras endured overflowing rivers, engulfing cities, villages, and crops with mud and water. Gert's winds were at their strongest upon landfall in Mexico, yet the worst effects in the country were also due to freshwater flooding after an extreme rainfall event in the Huasteca region resulted in water accumulations as high as 31.41 inches (798 mm). An increasing number of major rivers burst their banks over a period of several days, fully submerging extensive areas of land around the Pánuco basin. Tens of thousands of residents were forced to evacuate as raging floodwaters demolished scores of structures in what was described as the region's worst disaster in 40 years.

In Gert's wake, the road networks across the affected countries remained severely disrupted for extended periods of time, hampering rescue missions and relief efforts in badly flooded regions. National governments and emergency workers opened shelters and distributed food for the thousands that had lost their homes and sources of income in the storm. Throughout Central America and Mexico, Gert claimed the lives of 116 people and left 16 others missing. The disaster left swaths of private property, infrastructure, and farmland in complete ruins, amounting to damage costs of more than $170 million (1993 USD). Despite the excessive damage and catastrophic loss of life caused by the storm, the name Gert was not retired following the season, and was used again in the 1999 Atlantic hurricane season.

== Meteorological history ==
Map plotting the storm's track and intensity, according to the Saffir–Simpson scale Map key Saffir–Simpson scale Tropical depression (≤38 mph, ≤62 km/h) Tropical storm (39–73 mph, 63–118 km/h) Category 1 (74–95 mph, 119–153 km/h) Category 2 (96–110 mph, 154–177 km/h) Category 3 (111–129 mph, 178–208 km/h) Category 4 (130–156 mph, 209–251 km/h) Category 5 (≥157 mph, ≥252 km/h) Unknown Storm type Tropical cyclone Subtropical cyclone Extratropical cyclone, remnant low, tropical disturbance, or monsoon depression

Hurricane Gert had a complex lifespan as a large and slow-moving tropical cyclone, repeatedly interacting with nearby landmasses and other atmospheric systems. Its genesis was traced to a tropical wave—an area of low pressure oriented north to south—that moved off the African coast to the south of Dakar on September 5, 1993. The wave tracked westward across the tropical Atlantic at a rapid pace and relatively low latitudes, where its interaction with the Intertropical Convergence Zone fostered the formation of convection. On its approach to the Caribbean, the system developed a weak low-pressure center at sea level, which crossed Trinidad on September 11. Although most of the cloud field brushed over the northern coast of South America, the system survived its contact with land and emerged over the southwestern Caribbean Sea on September 13. There, owing to favorable tropospheric conditions aloft, the wave showed signs of cyclonic development, as its convection thickened into curved, well-defined bands. Given these structural changes alongside a defined surface circulation, forecasters at the National Hurricane Center (NHC) classified the system as a tropical depression at 1800 UTC on September 14, when it was located 105 miles (169 km) north of the Atlantic coast of Panama.

From its inception onwards, the depression exhibited a rather large wind field on satellite images and radiosonde data. Its broad cloud pattern gradually coalesced, and by 0900 UTC on September 15, the NHC had determined it sufficiently strong to be upgraded to Tropical Storm Gert. The center of the storm proceeded west-northwestward, moving ashore near Bluefields, Nicaragua, with winds of 40 mph (64 km/h) at 1800 UTC. Gert's interaction with land impeded additional strengthening; the storm weakened back to a tropical depression just six hours after its landfall. While the storm's center remained land-bound for nearly two days, parts of its large circulation abutted the adjacent Caribbean and Pacific waters to draw in moisture and heat. As such, Gert retained its status as a tropical cyclone on its journey northwestward across the terrains of Nicaragua and Honduras. In doing so, the storm consistently defied the NHC's forecasts for its imminent dissipation.

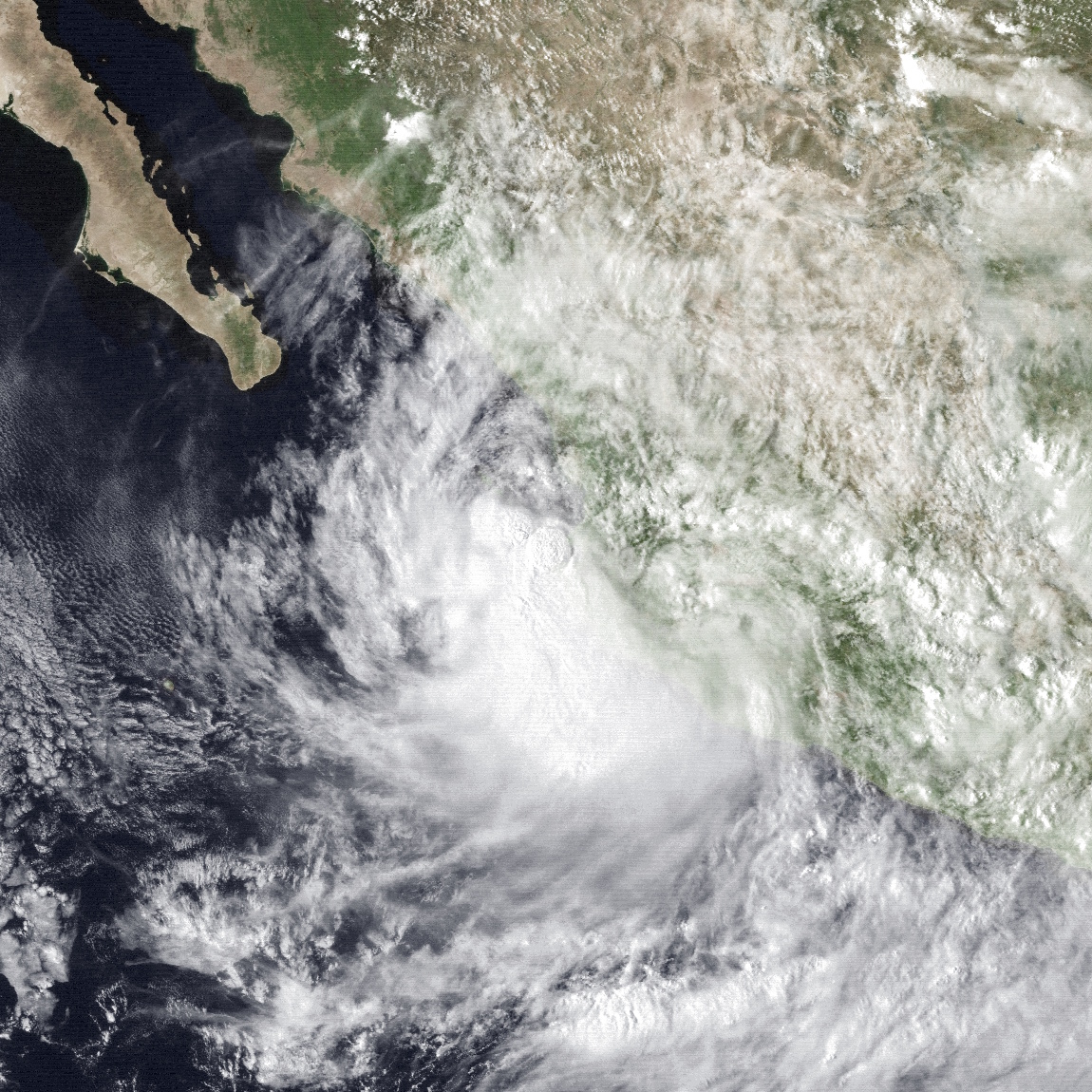
Tropical Depression Fourteen-E shortly after entering the Pacific Ocean on September 21

On September 17, Gert finally exited the coast, accessed the waters of the Gulf of Honduras and restrengthened to a tropical storm. Its duration over water—and with that any opportunity for additional strengthening—was curtailed by a mid- to upper-level trough over the eastern Gulf of Mexico; it turned the storm to the north-northwest and brought it over the coast of Belize the next day. Inland, Gert began to interact with a high-pressure ridge to its northwest, which nudged the storm slightly more to the west. After crossing the Yucatán Peninsula and winding down over land, Gert entered the Bay of Campeche offshore Champotón as a tropical depression late on September 18. The open tropical waters, combined with light wind shear aloft, allowed the storm's convection to deepen and reconsolidate. At 0600 UTC the next day, Gert once more restrengthened into a tropical storm. The storm veered toward the west and slowed slightly in response to a shortwave trough to its north, granting it more time to mature over water. On September 20, data from a United States Air Force aircraft indicated that Gert had become a hurricane with maximum winds of 75 mph (121 km/h). Within hours, it attained its peak intensity as a Category 2 hurricane on the Saffir–Simpson scale, with sustained winds of 100 mph (160 km/h) and a minimum pressure of 970 mbar (hPa; 28.64 inHg).

At about 2100 UTC on September 20, Gert made its final landfall at peak intensity on the coast of Mexico, just north of Tuxpan, Veracruz. The hurricane accelerated and weakened quickly over the rugged mountains of the Sierra Madre Oriental, deteriorating into a tropical depression by September 21. Despite its declining strength, the large circulation again remained intact as it crossed the country. Gert entered the Pacific Ocean off the coast of Nayarit later that day, where the NHC reclassified it as Tropical Depression Fourteen-E. What remained of the deep convection waxed and waned in intensity; satellite estimates show the depression may have briefly regained tropical storm strength on September 22. It proceeded on a west to west-northwestward track with sparse thunderstorms for two days. Once the last of this convection diminished, the shallow cyclone was swept up by low-level flow. Steered farther and farther southwest, the depression encountered increasingly cool ocean temperatures. With any chance at redevelopment thwarted, the system dissipated at sea on September 26.

== Preparations ==
After confirming the development of a tropical depression, authorities in Costa Rica issued a green alert (Note: The Latin American hurricane alert system uses the colors blue, green, yellow, orange, and red to denote the scale of danger; blue indicates the lowest threat and red the greatest.) for coastal regions on September 14. The following day, a tropical storm warning was issued for the Atlantic coast of the country. National television and radio stations broadcast warning messages to the public, and emergency crews were dispatched in case conditions were to warrant intervention. This helped with the effective and timely clearing of hospitals, as well as the evacuation of residents in high-risk zones. A tropical storm warning was posted for the Atlantic coast of Nicaragua on September 15, extending south from Puerto Cabezas to the adjacent islands. In Honduras, early storm warnings allowed several hundred residents to evacuate well ahead of Gert's arrival. Once it became evident that the storm would strike the Yucatán Peninsula, coastal areas from Belize northward to Cozumel, Mexico, were placed under a tropical storm warning on September 17 until Gert's landfall the next day.

While Gert was still located over the peninsula, the government of Mexico issued a tropical storm watch for the Gulf Coast from the city of Veracruz northward to Soto la Marina, Tamaulipas. By September 18, it was upgraded to a tropical storm warning and extended southward to Minatitlán, although the initial watch area was placed under a hurricane watch after Gert showed signs of strengthening. The next day, the tropical storm watch from Soto La Marina to Nautla was upgraded to a hurricane warning as it became clearer where Gert would make landfall. Prior to impact, several ports along the Gulf Coast halted their operations, and people living in risk zones were evacuated. All warnings and watches were discontinued after the hurricane moved inland.

== Impact ==
Casualties by country
Country	Deaths	Missing
Honduras	27	12
Nicaragua	37	N/A
El Salvador	5	4
Costa Rica	1	0
Guatemala	1	0
Mexico	45	0
Total	116	16

Gert was a large tropical cyclone for most of its lifespan; it always remained close enough to the coast to restrengthen and redevelop strong thunderstorms. In consequence, the storm produced heavy rainfall over a large area, causing extensive flooding and mudslides from Central America to Mexico. The disaster resulted in at least 116 deaths and 16 missing persons; damage to roads, property, crops and vegetation surmounted $170 million. (Note: All damage figures in the article are in 1993 United States dollars (USD).)

=== Costa Rica ===
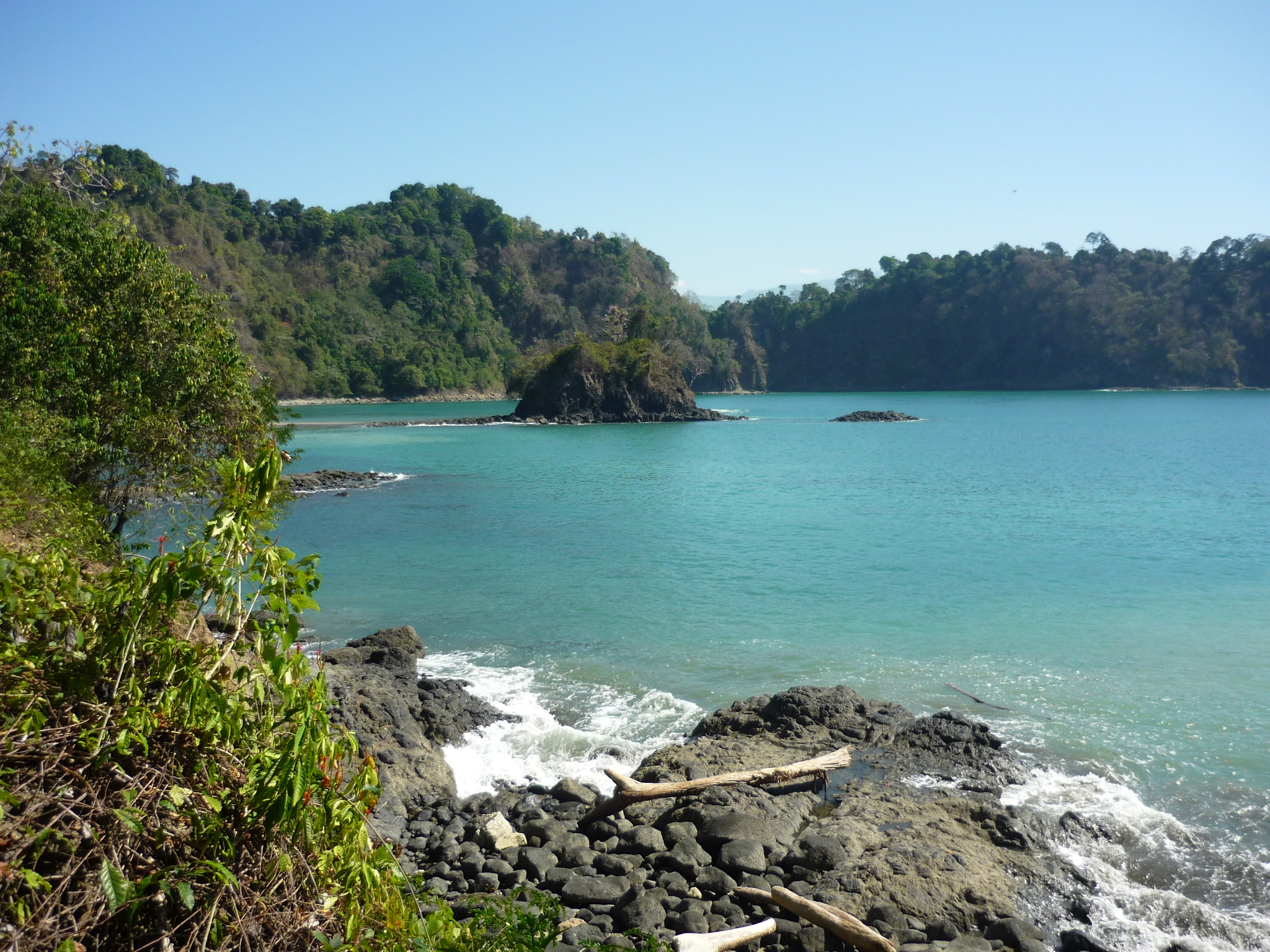
The Manuel Antonio National Park, located in the Central Pacific Conservation Area, suffered great destruction from the storm.

Although Gert's center remained off the coast of Costa Rica, its large circulation produced brisk winds and heavy rainfall across the country. A local weather station recorded 13.1 inches (330 mm) of rain during the storm. Geologically, the hardest-hit regions consisted of sedimentary layers with poor hydraulic conductivity and were therefore prone to soil saturation. The initial rainfall raised the levels of many rivers, exacerbating the flood threat. The imminent overflow of the Tempisque River prompted wide-scale evacuations, though the river crested gradually without major consequences. After hours of prolonged rainfall, many Pacific regions such as Quepos, Pérez Zeledón, and Osa experienced flooding and landslides, which inflicted moderate damage to roads and bridges.

The floods ruined about 500 acres (2.0 km^{2}) of banana crop and damaged oil palm plantations. Small-scale farmers of reed, maize, beans, and rice were also affected. The storm disrupted local fishing and wrecked several small boats in Quepos. High winds brought great destruction to about 65 percent of the vegetation in the Manuel Antonio National Park, vastly impacting the tourism-driven economy of Quepos. Gert left moderate property damage in its wake; it destroyed 27 homes and otherwise damaged 659, mostly because of flooding. Overall costs totaled $3.1 million, of which $1.7 million was due to the impaired infrastructure. Roughly 1,000 people sought shelter during the storm. Owing to the timely preparations in the country, only one cardiac arrest fatality was attributable to Gert when a landslide buried a home.

=== Nicaragua ===
Moving ashore in Nicaragua a month after Tropical Storm Bret's passage, Gert caused excessive rainfall over already saturated regions. Despite striking the Atlantic coast, the storm produced the largest amounts of precipitation over northern and Pacific coastal areas. A maximum of 17.8 in (450 mm) fell at Corinto; other significant totals include 17.6 in (450 mm) at Chinandega and 17.5 in (440 mm) at León. The capital of Managua recorded 9.8 in (250 mm) of rain during the event. Sustained winds from the storm reached no more than 40 mph (64 km/h) upon landfall near Bluefields, though they downed trees and power lines and generated high waves of up to 12 feet (3.7 m) offshore. After weakening to a depression inland, Gert continued to produce moderate gales along its path through the country.

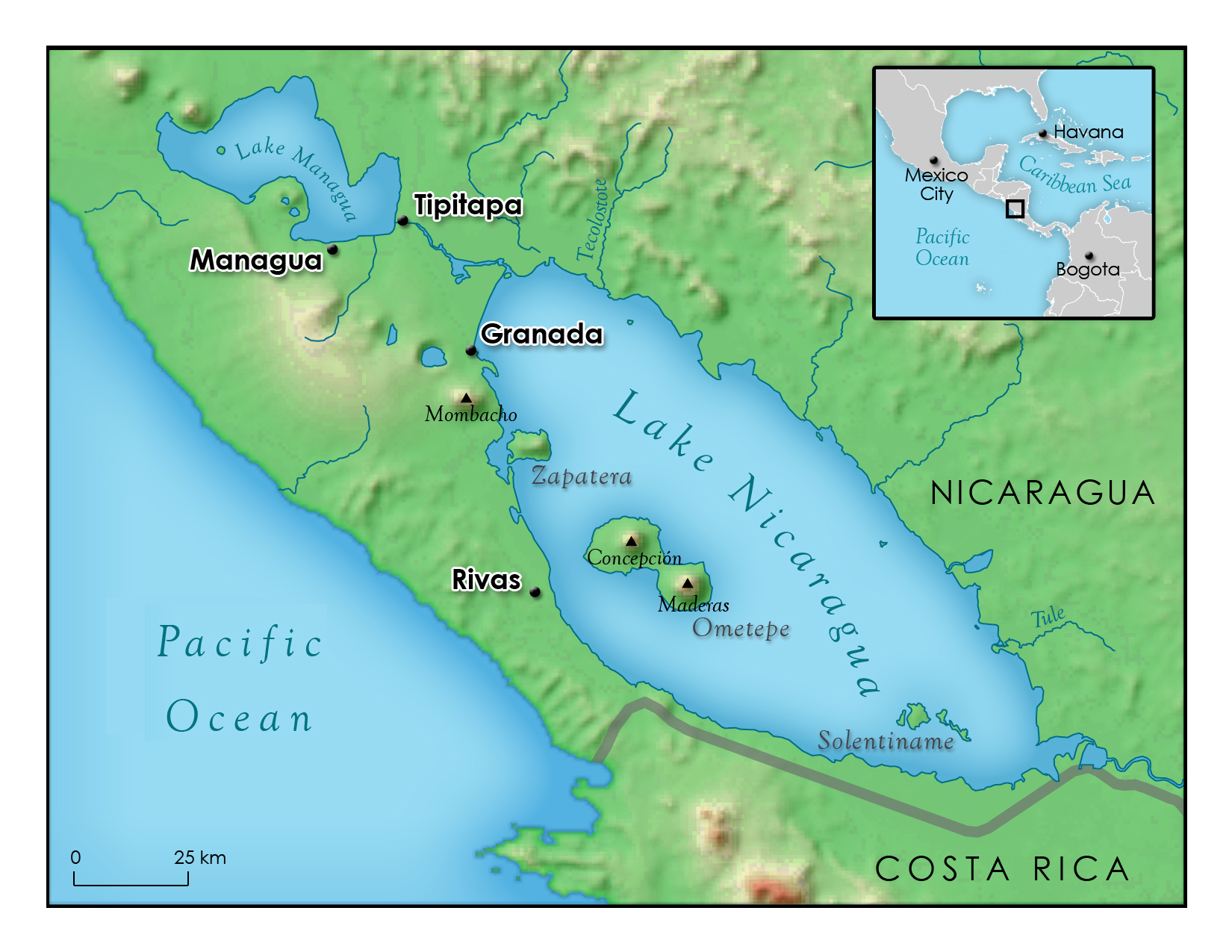
Flooding from Gert was especially severe around Lake Nicaragua, affecting the region's ecology and inundating many communities, including the cities of Riva and Granada shown.

Off the coast near Big Corn Island, rough surf and winds destroyed nine fishing boats. Two canoes with an unknown number of occupants disappeared at sea. Gert produced significant coastal flooding on moving ashore near Bluefields and Tasbapauni, prompting about 1,000 residents and hundreds of indigenous Miskito villagers to evacuate. Farther inland, prolonged heavy rain caused numerous rivers to overflow, which led to disastrous freshwater flooding, especially in departments around Lake Nicaragua. Three tributaries of the Escondido River, one of which rose 32 ft (9.8 m) above normal, overflowed near the city of Rama. Reaching heights of up to 40 ft (12 m), flood waters submerged 95 percent of the residential space, entering houses and vehicles and displacing 17,000 citizens. All crops in and around the city were lost in the deluge. In the Rivas Department, the discharge from the Ochomogo River near the city of Rivas inundated several communities, while Cárdenas, a coastal community along the border with Costa Rica, endured several days of flooding rains. Damage in the departments of Chontales and Boaco was considerable; floods in Boaco killed five people and affected 6,000 others. The affected regions endured widespread disruptions in transportation as landslides moved onto bridges and roads; in Granada city, the isolation caused sanitation issues and led to the death of a pregnant woman who could not be transported to the hospital.

In total, Gert destroyed 252 houses and damaged another 293 across 14 of Nicaragua's departments; the storm was also responsible for considerable infrastructural damage and economic losses. As many as 123,000 people were affected throughout the country, and there were 37 confirmed fatalities. The impact on the ecology was profound: rivers, estuaries, and mangroves in and around lakes Nicaragua and Managua, as well as the inhabiting fauna, suffered from severe erosion and siltation. Since flooding from Tropical Storm Bret had occurred just one month earlier, an exclusive damage estimate for Gert is unavailable. The two storms inflicted a combined $10.7 million in damage, primarily to private property.

=== Honduras ===
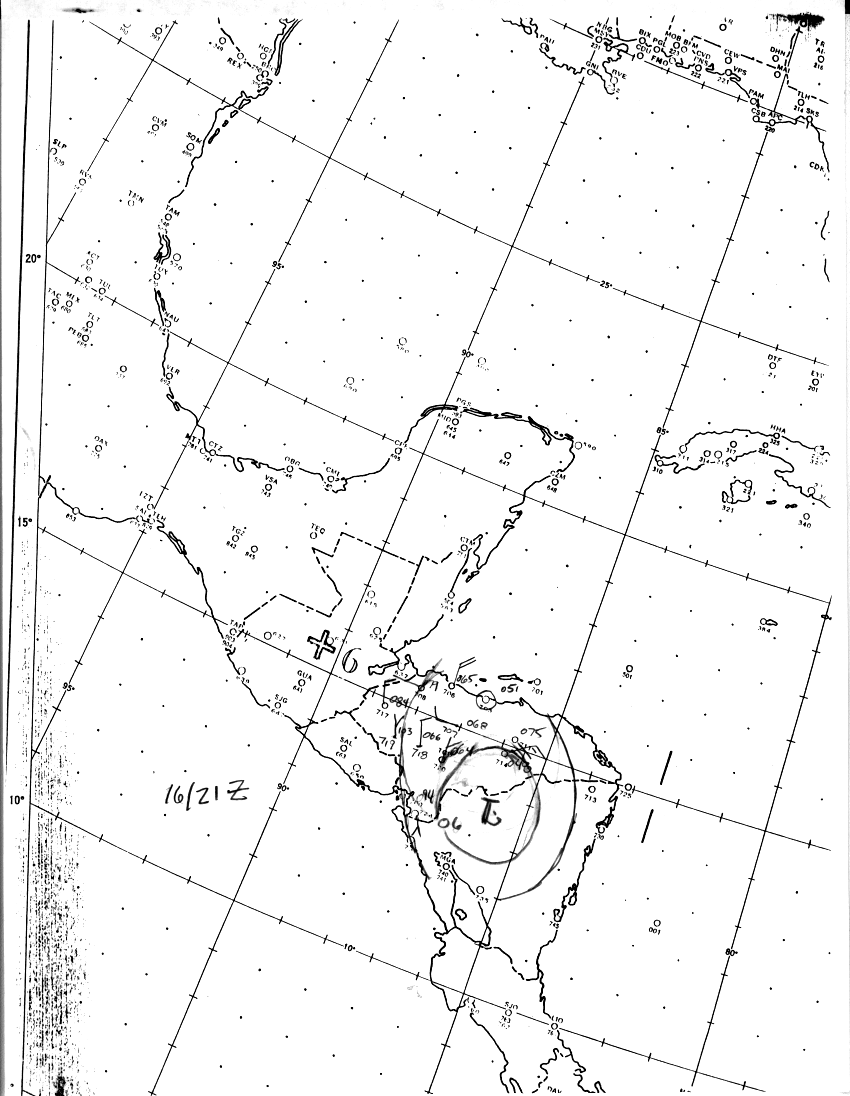
Surface weather analysis map of Gert as a tropical depression, with the center L located inland near the Honduras–Nicaragua border

Although it had weakened to a depression, Gert continued to drop significant rainfall while crossing Honduras. In Tegucigalpa, at least 6.77 in (172 mm) of rain were recorded. Damaging floods swept through 13 of the country's 18 departments; however, northern Honduras and the Mosquitia Region, which had already endured the onslaught of Tropical Storm Bret in the previous month, bore the brunt of the devastation. The additional flooding from Gert affected 24,000 people in the region and made communication with surrounding areas nearly impossible. Elsewhere, the rain filled several major rivers, including the Ulúa; many rivers across the Sula Valley had their banks destroyed, flooding much of San Pedro Sula—the country's second-largest city—and adjacent municipalities in the Cortés Department. The rising water prompted many residents to evacuate, and the Ramón Villeda Morales International Airport halted all of its operations. The storm devastated Puerto Cortés, one of the most important port cities in Central America. Elsewhere in the Cortés Department, a river in Choloma overflowed and triggered widespread flooding; landslides in that area claimed the lives of six people.

In all, Gert wrought $10 million worth of damage to roads, bridges, and property. The country's agriculture was devastated, losing about 5,700 acres (23 km^{2}) of low-lying farmland with banana, sugar, and citrus crops. The disaster affected 67,447 people, of which roughly 60 percent had to evacuate from their homes. In its final public statement, the government of Honduras confirmed 27 deaths, though 12 missing persons remained unaccounted for.

=== Elsewhere in Central America ===
While passing through Central America, Gert generated an increase in cloudiness and showers across El Salvador, with a maximum 15.35 in (390 mm) of rain recorded. Strong winds uprooted trees or snapped their limbs, damaging power lines and knocking out power. In one community, mudslides destroyed a major highway. The Río Grande de San Miguel caused an excessive discharge of water just southwest of Usulután, washing out about 2,500 acres (10 km^{2}) of crops from adjacent plantations. Several other areas faced significant losses from the flooding, including San Marcos and San Vicente; some property and road damage occurred in San Miguel. Although fishing operations were suspended at the height the storm, four Salvadorean fishermen disappeared at sea. Overall, Gert affected nearly 8,000 residents and destroyed twelve homes in El Salvador; officials there confirmed five drowning deaths related to the storm.

In Guatemala, torrential rains from Gert affected approximately 20,000 people and killed one girl. The agricultural sector in the country suffered substantial losses from the flooding, though there were no specific reports of material damage. Gert moved ashore near Belize City as a minimal tropical storm, dropping rainfall in coastal areas. Just offshore, a weather station on Hunting Caye recorded 9.5 in (240 mm) during the event. Despite the rain, only minor flooding occurred in Belize City.

=== Mexico ===
While crossing the Yucatán Peninsula, Gert dropped considerable rainfall in Quintana Roo; a 24-hour accumulation of 7.4 in (190 mm) was recorded at Chetumal, although higher localized totals of around 15 in (380 mm) fell elsewhere in the state. Gusty winds briefly buffeted the coast during the storm's landfall, with a maximum wind speed of 44 mph (71 km/h) recorded in Chetumal. The effects of the storm were limited to localized floods, however, which cut off one road to traffic and forced the inhabitants from low-lying areas in Chetumal and Felipe Carrillo Puerto to evacuate to higher ground. Scattered showers also caused light flooding in parts of the state of Campeche, including Ciudad del Carmen.

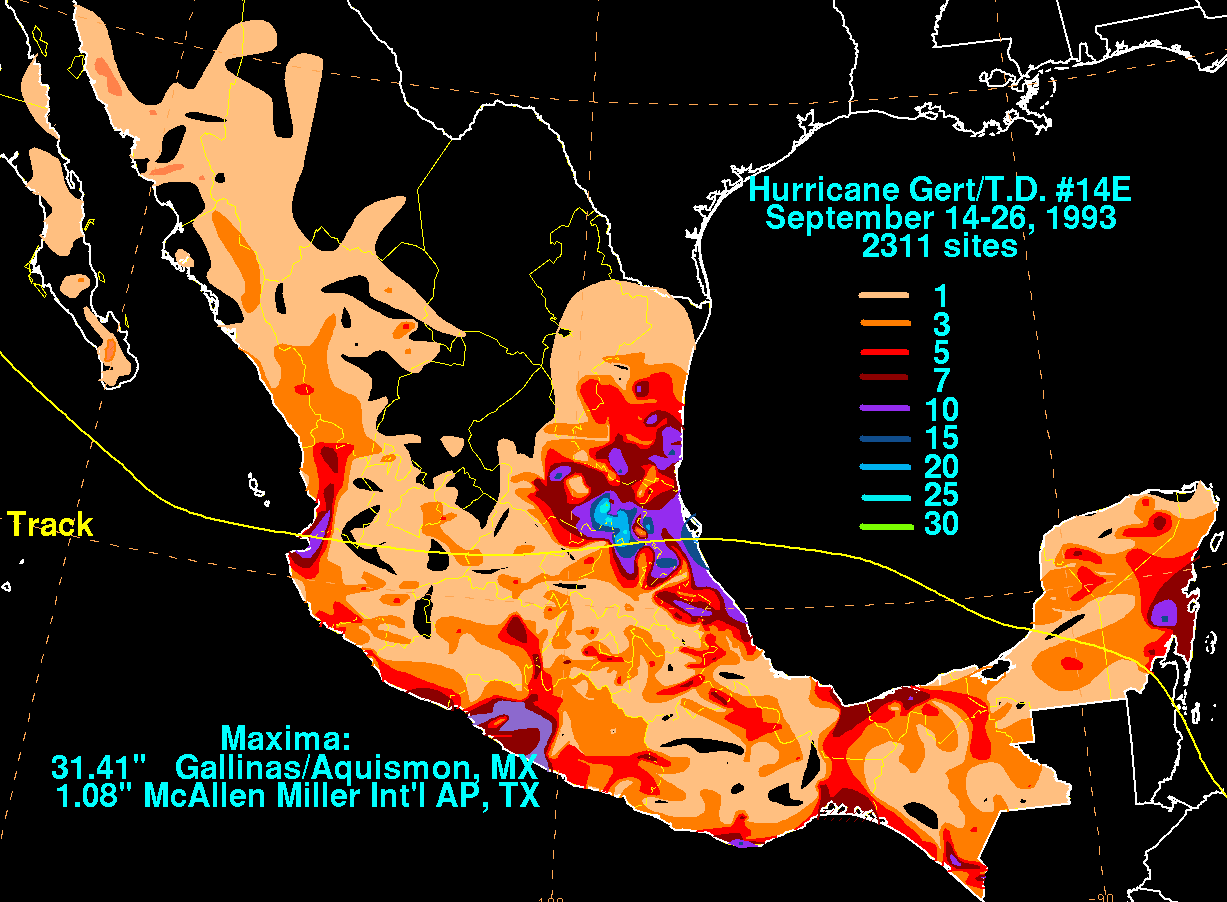
Rainfall from Gert across Mexico, showing high concentrations in the Huasteca region

Upon Gert's final landfall, high gales and waves battered wide stretches of coastline in the states of Tamaulipas and Veracruz, though hurricane-force winds were largely confined to areas within the cyclone's southern eyewall. Tuxpan, just south of where the eye moved ashore, recorded wind velocities of more than 100 mph (160 km/h), while 80 mph (130 km/h) gusts occurred farther south in Poza Rica. To the north, winds reached 55 mph (89 km/h) in Tampico, Tamaulipas. Despite the severity of the winds, the worst of Gert was due to orographic lift when its broad circulation interacted with the eastern side of the Sierra Madre Oriental, generating extreme precipitation over much of the Huasteca region. As many as 31.41 in (798 mm) of rain were recorded in Aquismón, San Luis Potosí, while Tempoal in Veracruz observed a 24-hour total of 13.35 in (339 mm) from the storm.

The first signs of damage were from high winds on September 20, which uprooted trees and tore off residential roofs in Tuxpan, Naranjos, Cerro Azul, and Poza Rica. Following Gert's extreme rains, catastrophic flooding struck Mexico's Huasteca region over a period of several days, as many of its rivers rose to critical levels. In Veracruz, the imminent overflow of the Tempoal, Moctezuma, and Calabozo rivers forced thousands of residents from the municipalities of Tempoal, El Higo, and Platón Sánchez to leave their homes. The Calabozo River eventually topped its banks, cutting the village of Platón Sánchez off from the outside world. By far the most devastating, however, was the overflow of the Pánuco River on September 24, which runs from the Valley of Mexico through the municipality of Pánuco and empties in the gulf. Rushing water swept through 30 of Veracruz's 212 municipalities, completely submerging more than 5,000 homes. El Higo bore the brunt of the flooding, with 90 percent of its residential area left under water.

After days of continued downpours in Gert's wake, the Pánuco River rose to 27.60 ft (8.41 m) above normal by September 27—its highest level in 40 years. Once again exceeding its banks, the river destroyed a major levee in city of Pánuco, forcing 8,000 residents to evacuate. Disastrous flooding reached as far north as southern Tamaulipas, where 5,000 people had to seek refuge. Half of Tampico was coated in deep layers of mud, with scores of structures demolished. The urban areas of Madero and Altamira were also hit by the deluge. Roughly 2,000,000 acres (8,100 km^{2}) of land around the Pánuco basin and Tampico were under water, including vast amounts of citrus, coffee, corn, maiz, bean, grain, and soy crops. Telephone, water, and electricity services throughout the region were severely disrupted, and numerous communities were isolated due to broken bridges and roads. In San Luis Potosí, water damage to schools, bridges, and roads was particularly widespread. The agricultural sector suffered heavy losses when the flooding washed away large amounts of livestock and roughly 80 percent of its crops. Throughout the state, 55,000 residents were affected by the storm, and 25 people lost their lives. Gert's trail of destruction extended as far inland as Hidalgo, where 35 rivers overtopped their banks. Floods and mudslides destroyed 38 bridges and 86 roads, as well cutting off power, telephone, and water services, disrupting communication in 361 localities. Property damage in Hidalgo was significant; 4,425 homes, 121 schools, and 49 public buildings were compromised across 35 municipalities. About 167,000 acres (680 km^{2}) of farmland were destroyed in the storm. Fifteen deaths occurred in the state, and eight people sustained injuries.

Overall, Gert became the worst natural disaster to strike the region in 40 years; it displaced 203,500 people—many in need of shelter—and left 29,075 houses damaged or destroyed across Mexico. More than 667,000 acres (2,700 km^{2}) of crops were in ruins. Material damage totaled $156 million, and the death toll stood at 45.

== Aftermath ==
=== Central America ===
Because of the storm's impact on the country, the government of Costa Rica declared a national emergency on September 16, 1993. Emergency crews were dispatched to assess the damage and distribute life supplies to the affected population, including 90,940 pounds (41,250 kg) of food, 1,422 mattresses, and 1,350 blankets. With much of the road network left disrupted across the affected regions, the country's agriculture, tourism, and commerce suffered considerable losses. In particular, the obstruction of the major Pan-American Highway, which connects the central region to the south of the country, had a discernible impact on the local economy. Following the expansive flooding of farmland, many independent crop producers were unable to partake in subsequent sowings.

Prior to Gert, a state of emergency had been in effect for Nicaragua as a result of Tropical Storm Bret. National and regional aid agencies, including the Red Cross, accordingly extended their relief efforts with the passage of Gert. Following the widespread muddy floods, many rural areas along the coast where the storm made landfall necessitated purification of their water wells and reconstruction of those that had been destroyed. Although the government did not reappeal for international assistance, several cash donations were made by overseas organizations through a transfer channel at the Swiss Bank Corporation. The United Nations Development Programme provided $50,000 for the purchase of fuel, and UNICEF distributed $25,000 worth of household supplies and medicine. The World Food Programme donated 160,000 lbs (72 tonnes) of food supplies and offered disaster expert services. The federal governments of Japan, Canada, Switzerland, Norway, Germany, and Spain donated a combined $300,000 in aid.

On September 18, the President of Honduras declared a state of emergency for several municipalities after surveying the affected regions by helicopter. The governments of Japan, Canada, Germany, and the United Kingdom provided a combined $310,300 for the purchase of relief items. Although most storm victims received aid within a few days, the deteriorated road network caused a large delay in relief efforts to the hard-hit Mosquitia region. Sewage systems and waterworks countrywide were in serious need of restoration. With the destruction of its sole water reservoir, much of Puerto Cortés endured potable water shortages for months in Gert's wake. Public health concerns rose in the wake of Gert, with the cost of required medicines pinned at $208,000. A contamination of the water supplies in rural areas exacerbated a cholera outbreak. By September 28, about 27,000 residents unable to reenter their flooded homes remained in government shelters. Seven weeks later, a temporary housing project was implemented for the 120 families most in need. Approximately 5,900 families across Honduras lost their source of income due to the storm.

=== Mexico ===
A satellite animation of Gert traversing the Bay of Campeche and Mexico

In response to the flood disaster, the Red Cross immediately began distributing aid to victims across the Huasteca region. After assessing the situation by helicopter, the President of Mexico declared the Pánuco river basin an emergency zone and ordered search and rescue missions. Many homes sustained irreparable damage to their roofs, leaving tens of thousands homeless. The government appealed for international aid, seeking clothes, food, and medical supplies. Five storage centers in Hidalgo provided more than 93 million lbs (42,000 tonnes) of food supplies. Throughout San Luis Potosí, 142,000 lb (64 t) of chicken, 45,000 pantries, and 76,000 disposable plates were distributed, as well as 50,440 blankets and 6,081 airbeds. Several schools served as shelters for the homeless; the sheltered elderly, children, and pregnant or nursing women received $27,000 worth of milk powder donations.

In the wake of Gert, the amount of respiratory disease and skin infection cases rose slightly, although the overall health situation for the country remained well under control. By two weeks after the hurricane, over 65,000 people across the region had been accommodated in shelters; most stayed there until the floods receded, although many who returned home a month later continued to rely on relief provisions. A grant of $22,000 was made available for the purchase of roofing sheets for those in urgent need of home repair. The president approved $37.4 million to commence reconstruction of roads and houses and to assist farmers throughout the region.

== See also ==
- List of Category 2 Atlantic hurricanes
- List of Atlantic–Pacific crossover hurricanes
- Hurricane Debby (1988)
- Hurricane Diana (1990)
- Tropical Storm Arlene (1993)
- Tropical Storm Bret (1993)
