= Platón Sánchez (disambiguation) =

Platón Sánchez was a 19th-century artillery officer in the Mexican Army.

Platón Sánchez may also refer to the following locations named for him:

- Platón Sánchez, Veracruz, a town in the Mexican state of Veracruz
- Platón Sánchez (municipality), the surrounding municipality
