= Hurricane Dolly (1996) =

Category 1 Atlantic hurricane in 1996

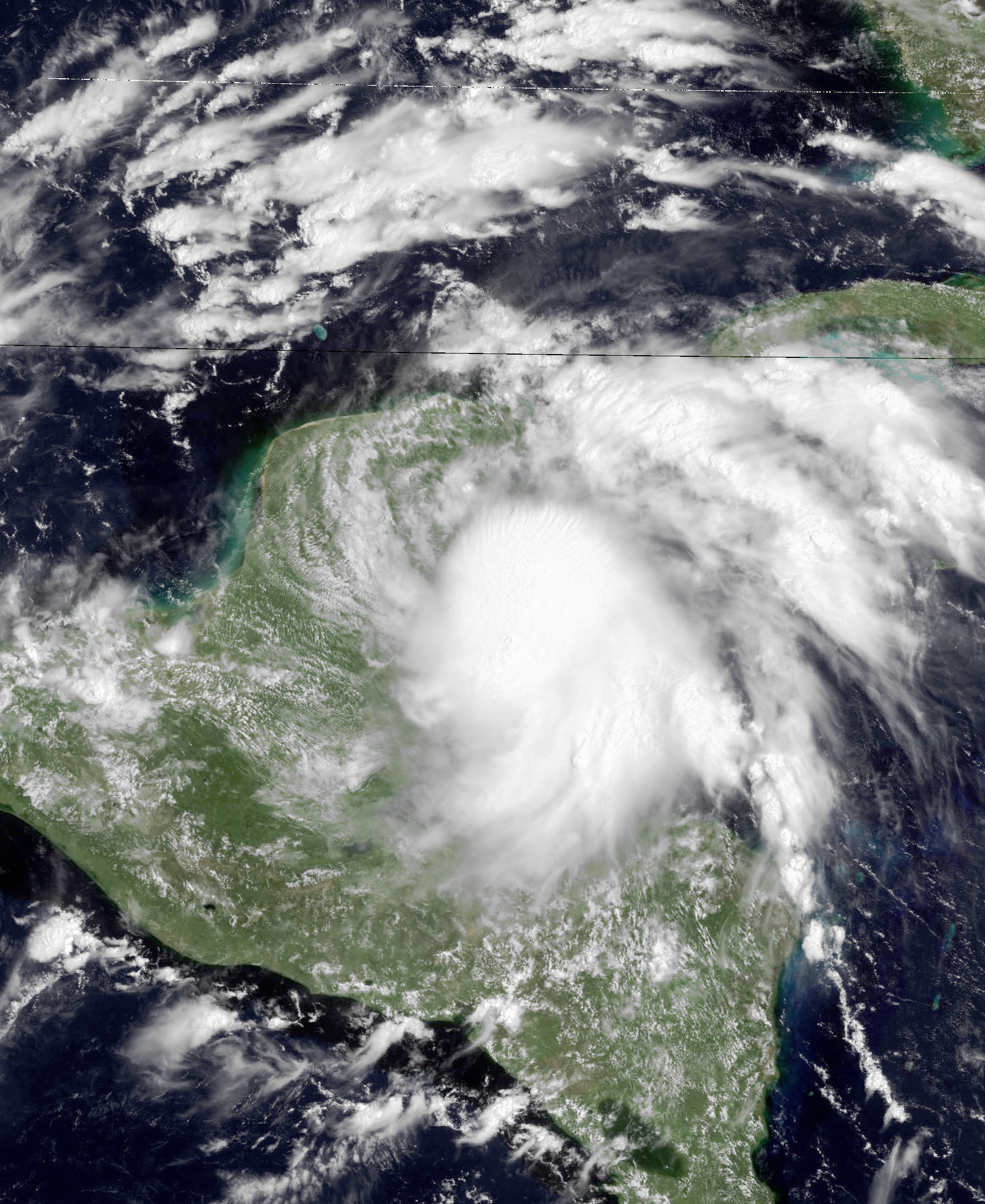
- Dolly approaching the Yucatan Peninsula on August 20

Meteorological history
- Formed: August 19, 1996
- Dissipated: August 25, 1996

Category 1 hurricane
- 1-minute sustained (SSHWS/NWS)
- Highest winds: 80 mph (130 km/h)
- Lowest pressure: 989 mbar (hPa); 29.21 inHg

Overall effects
- Fatalities: 14 direct
- Areas affected: Belize, Mexico, Texas
- IBTrACS
- Part of the 1996 Atlantic and Pacific hurricane seasons

Hurricane Dolly caused flooding throughout Mexico in August 1996. The fourth named storm and third hurricane of the season, Dolly developed from a tropical wave to the west-southwest of Jamaica on August 19. Initially a tropical depression, the system strengthened into a tropical storm about twelve hours later. Dolly headed westward and intensified into a Category 1 hurricane late on August 20. It then made landfall near Chetumal, Quintana Roo. The system weakened to a tropical depression on August 21. Later that day or early on August 22, Dolly emerged into the Bay of Campeche and quickly re-strengthened into a tropical storm. The storm deepened further and was upgraded to a hurricane again by midday on August 23; Dolly simultaneously peaked with winds of 80 mph (130 km/h). Around that time, it struck between Tuxpan, Veracruz, and Tampico, Tamaulipas. Dolly quickly weakened to a tropical depression early on August 24, but remained intact while crossing Mexico and dissipated over the eastern Pacific Ocean on August 25.

The storm brought heavy rainfall to much of Mexico, peaking at 37.41 inches (950 mm). In Quintana Roo, flooding destroyed a large amount of farmlands. Widespread flooding occurred after a river in the Pueblo Viejo area overflowed its banks. Hundreds of homes were destroyed, displacing about 35,000 people. Large scale evacuations occurred in San Luis Potosí, while about 6,500 fled their homes in the Tampico area. Communications and power outages were reported as far west as Mazatlán, Sinaloa. Throughout Mexico, there were fourteen fatalities reported, including six in Veracruz, three in Nuevo León, one in Monterrey, and another in Pueblo Viejo. Additionally, two people were left missing in Nuevo León. The outer bands of Dolly brought rainfall to southern Texas, which caused minor flooding, but was mostly beneficial due to drought conditions in the state.

== Meteorological history ==
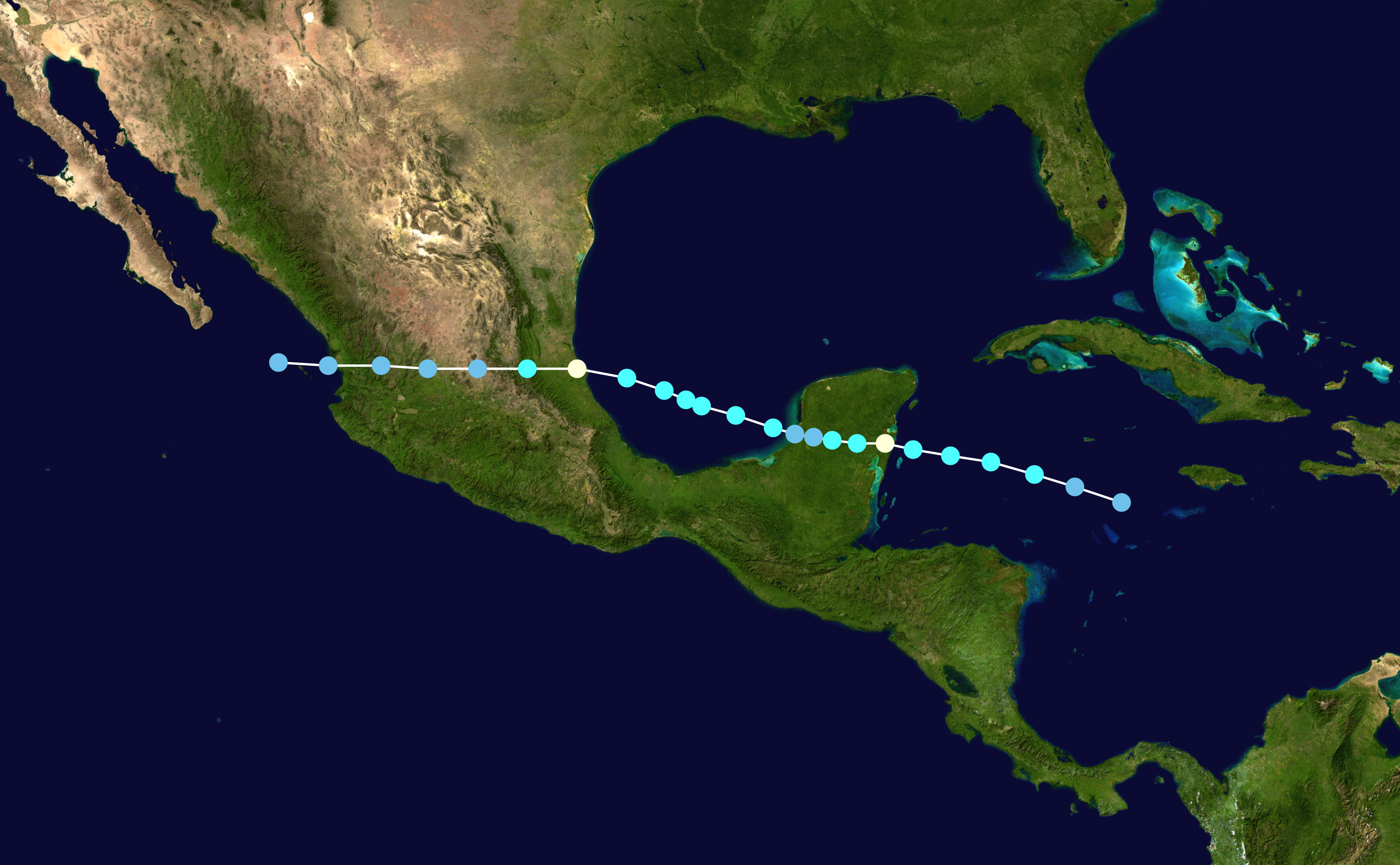
Map plotting the storm's track and intensity, according to the Saffir–Simpson scale Map key Saffir–Simpson scale Tropical depression (≤38 mph, ≤62 km/h) Tropical storm (39–73 mph, 63–118 km/h) Category 1 (74–95 mph, 119–153 km/h) Category 2 (96–110 mph, 154–177 km/h) Category 3 (111–129 mph, 178–208 km/h) Category 4 (130–156 mph, 209–251 km/h) Category 5 (≥157 mph, ≥252 km/h) Unknown Storm type Tropical cyclone Subtropical cyclone Extratropical cyclone, remnant low, tropical disturbance, or monsoon depression

A large tropical wave, an elongated trough of low pressure, emerged into the Atlantic Ocean from the west coast of Africa around August 9. Although deep convection was associated with the wave when it entered the Atlantic, showers and thunderstorms remained minimal for several days as the system tracked westward. Upon reaching the eastern Caribbean Sea, deep convection redeveloped, but failed to persist, until the wave reached an area southwest of Jamaica on August 18. Around that time, a reconnaissance aircraft flight indicated a low to mid-level circulation, but the system was too weak to classify using the Dvorak technique. After a center fix was made by another reconnaissance flight and satellite imagery, as well as a ship observing winds of 52 mph (84 km/h), the system was classified as Tropical Depression Four at 06:00 UTC on August 19, while situated about 140 mi (230 km) west-southwest of South Negril Point, Jamaica.

With an initially poorly defined circulation, the depression moved west-northwestward. Because it developed near a mid to upper-level anticyclone, conditions were favorable for intensification, with the system becoming Tropical Storm Dolly around 18:00 UTC on August 19. Convection became more organized, and the storm strengthened into a Category 1 hurricane on the Saffir–Simpson hurricane wind scale just under twenty four hours later. At 17:30 UTC on August 20, Dolly made landfall near Punta Herrero, Quintana Roo – located northeast of Chetumal, with winds of 75 mph (120 km/h). Early the following day, the hurricane weakened to a tropical storm, and then to a tropical depression several hours later.

Late on August 21, Dolly emerged into the Bay of Campeche, with satellite imagery indicating that convection was displaced to the south of the center of circulation. However, the system soon began to restrengthening, regaining tropical storm intensity by 00:00 UTC on August 22. Early on the following day, the cyclone began turning westward. At 12:00 UTC on August 23, Dolly reintensified into a hurricane and attained its peak intensity with maximum sustained winds of 80 mph (130 km/h) and a minimum barometric pressure of 989 mbar (29.2 inHg). Simultaneously, the hurricane made landfall between Tuxpan, Veracruz, and Tampico, Tamaulipas. Six hours after moving inland, Dolly weakened to a tropical storm. Early on August 24, the system deteriorated to a tropical depression. Dolly remained intact while crossing Mexico and emerged into the Pacific Ocean several hours later, but was not reclassified as an eastern Pacific tropical cyclone and dissipated about 40 mi (65 km) west of San Juanito in the Islas Marías.

== Preparations ==
At 18:00 UTC on August 19, a tropical storm warning was issued from Chetumal to Progreso, Yucatán, while a tropical storm watch was placed between Pinar del Río Province and Isle of Pines, Cuba. Just three hours later, another tropical storm warning was put into effect between San Pedro Town, Belize, and the Mexican border. On August 20, the tropical storm watch was discontinued for Cuba, as the system was moving away from the area. At 15:00 UTC, another tropical storm warning was issued from Progreso, Yucatán, to Ciudad del Carmen. Only an hour later, a tropical storm warning from Cozumel to Chetumal was upgraded to a hurricane warning. By 21:00 UTC on August 20, all warnings south of Cozumel were discontinued. Just six hours later on August 21, all tropical storm warnings east of 88°W were discontinued. Shortly after that, a tropical storm warning east of Progreso was removed. All warnings for Mexico were discontinued at 15:00 UTC on August 21. When Dolly entered the Bay of Campeche on August 22, a hurricane watch was put into action for Veracruz, La Pesca, and all areas in between, at 09:00 UTC. Only six hours later, the watch became a hurricane warning until Dolly made landfall at 18:00 UTC on August 23, when all remaining warnings were removed.

Throughout the Yucatán Peninsula, airports and ports were closed, while regularly scheduled bus routes were canceled. About 180 locations were prepared to serve as a shelter if large scale evacuations were necessary. In Punta Allen and Punta Herrero, authorities ordered the evacuation of about 100 families. Dozens of oil and gas wells in the Bay of Campeche owned by Pemex were evacuated, while Shell Oil Company evacuated some people from an oil platform farther north. Approximately 6,500 people were evacuated from low-lying areas of Tampico and flood prone locations in San Luis Potosi. The General Francisco Javier Mina International Airport closed for most of the day on August 23. A total of 37 ports along the Gulf Coast of Mexico were closed. In Texas, Cameron County officials purchased satellite telephones and generators and released 55 prisoners because of fear that the newly built jail might not withstand a hurricane.

== Impact ==
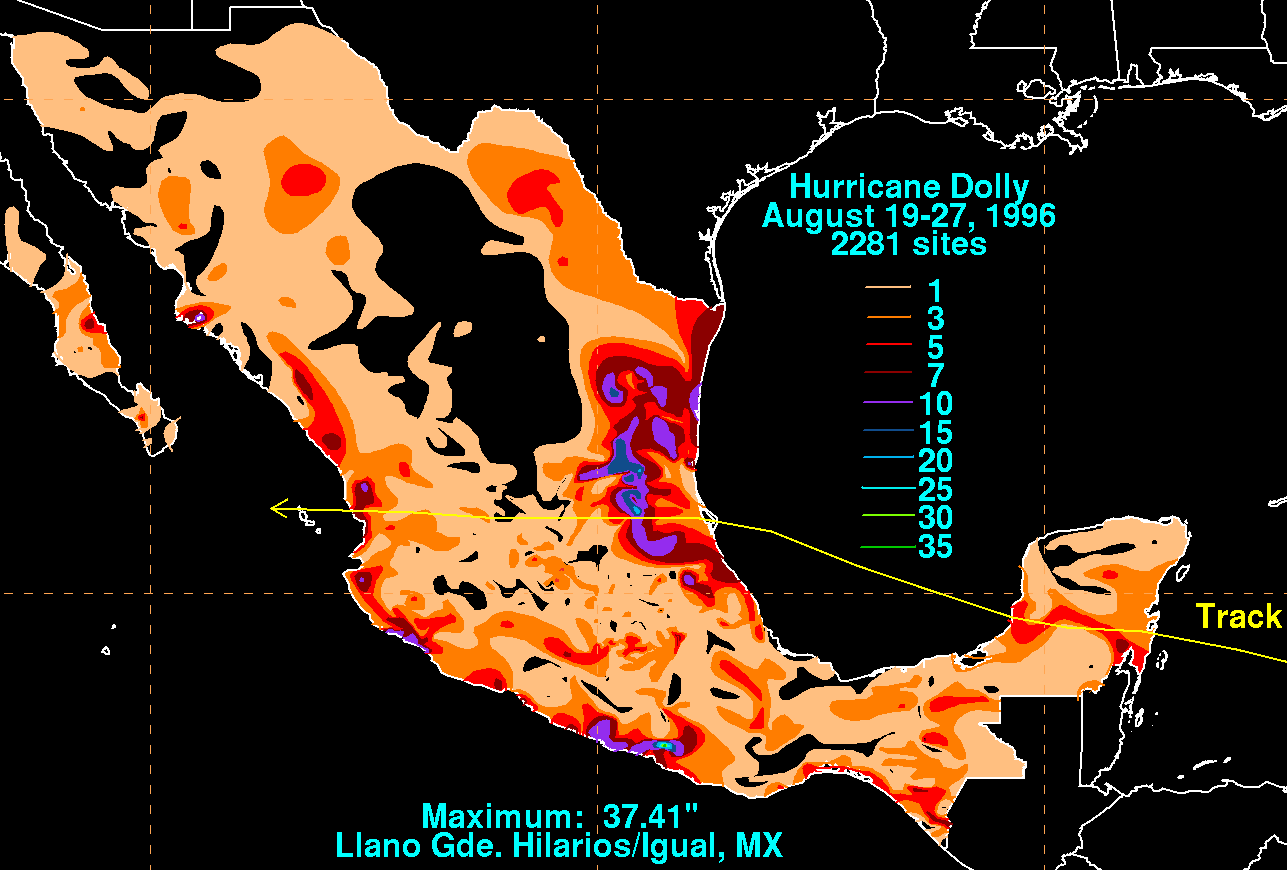
Dolly's rainfall across Mexico

=== Belize and Mexico ===
Just over 2 inches (51 mm) of rain fell into central Belize as the storm passed to the north. In Quintana Roo, 5.73 in (146 mm) of precipitation fell in Chetumal, flooding large areas of farmland. A total of 16 homes were destroyed and 26 others were damaged. At least two fishermen were left missing.

In Tampico, near the location of the storm's second landfall, the streets were littered with fallen trees branches, utility poles, and billboards. Additionally, many roads were inundated with water, leaving some impassable. Nearby, over 700 people fled their homes for shelter due to flooding in Ciudad Madero. One death occurred in Pueblo Viejo when a woman was crushed by a tree that fell on her house. Six other deaths occurred in Veracruz, five from a ship capsizing near Boca del Río and another after a person was caught in an undertow offshore Úrsulo Galván. Two landslides in northern Puebla left roads impassable, isolating some communities such as Tlatlauquitepec. Hundreds of homes were destroyed leaving 35,000 people homeless and there was severe damage in Tuxpan, Tamiahua, Pueblo Viejo, Platon, Pánuco, Tampico Alto, and elsewhere along the coast of northeast Mexico.

In Nuevo León, the storm caused four fatalities, including one in the city of Monterrey. The place with the most rainfall received in a 24-hour-period was in Micos, which observed 12.94 in (329 mm) of rain. Some other high rainfall recordings were in Santa Rosa, San Luis Potosí, which recorded 10.59 in (270 mm), and Puerto de Valles, which received 10 in (254 mm) of rain. Although well south of the storm's path, precipitation from Dolly peaked at 37.41 in (950 mm) in Iguala de la Independencia, Guerrero, making it the wettest tropical cyclone on record in Guerrero. In Sinaloa, three fatalities occurred, two when two people stepped into a puddle of water electrified by a downed power line and another from a weather-related traffic accident. According to newspaper reports, 14 people died in the storm's passage. An additional two people from Nuevo León were reported to be missing.

Country	Total	State	State total
Mexico	14	Veracruz	7
Mexico	14	Nuevo León	4
Mexico	14	Sinaloa	3

=== Texas ===
Though far from the United States, Dolly managed to bring heavy rain and high winds to southern Texas. Weekly rainfall totals in Corpus Christi reached 5.53 in (141 mm) and 2.82 in (71.6 mm) in Brownsville. Corpus Christi daily rainfall measurements on August 23 and August 24 were as high as 1.92 in (48.8 mm) and 2.55 in (64.8 ), respectively, a new daily record. The beach at the Padre Island National Seashore was closed after high tides began flooding the beaches and the John F. Kennedy Causeway, though other facilities such as the campground remained open. A tornado was spawned near Olmito, damaging a few homes and unroofing two others. Later, while passing north of Rancho Viejo, the twister inflicted impact on 10 dwellings and knocked over trees and signs.

== See also ==
- Other storms of the same name
- Hurricane Earl (2016)
- Hurricane Franklin (2017)
