= Chalma =

Chalma may refer to:

== Iran ==
- Chalma, Iran, a village in Zanjan Province

== Mexico ==
- Chalma, Malinalco, Mexico State
- Chalma (municipality), Veracruz
  - Chalma, Veracruz, a village in the municipality
