= Ciudad Cuauhtémoc, Veracruz =

City in Veracruz, Mexico

Ciudad Cuauhtémoc
- City & municipal seat
- Location within Veracruz Location within Mexico
- Coordinates: 22°11′0″N 97°50′0″W
- Country: Mexico
- State: Veracruz
- Municipality: Pueblo Viejo
- Settled: early 16th century
- City status: 1980

Government
  - Municipal President: Tomás Castillo Rivera (AFV), 2008-10
  - Federal electoral district: Veracruz's 1st
- Elevation: 10 m (33 ft)

Population (2005)
  - Total: 8,950
- Time zone: UTC-6 (Zona Centro)

Ciudad Cuauhtémoc is a city in the Huasteca Alta region of the Mexican state of Veracruz. It serves as the municipal seat of the surrounding municipality of Pueblo Viejo.

The name honours Cuauhtémoc (c. 1502–1525), last tlatoani of the Aztecs.

== Demographics ==
In the 2005 INEGI Census, Ciudad Cuauhtémoc reported a total population of 8,950.

== History ==
The settlement was founded in the early years of the Conquest, in the early 16th century, by Fray Andrés de Olmos. It was given city status in 1980.
