= Chiconamel (municipality) =

- Municipality
- Location within Veracruz Location within Mexico
- Coordinates: 21°14′0″N 98°27′0″W
- Country: Mexico
- State: Veracruz
- Municipal seat: Chiconamel

Government
  - Municipal President: Aldegundo Barragán Flores (AFV), 2009-10
  - Federal electoral district: Veracruz's 1st

Area
  - Total: 133.25 km^{2} (51.45 sq mi)
- Elevation: 140 m (460 ft)

Population (2005)
  - Total: 6,811
  - Density: 51.11/km^{2} (132.4/sq mi)
- Time zone: UTC-6 (Zona Centro)
- Website: http://presidenciachiconamel2022-2025.gob.mx

Chiconamel is a municipality in the Mexican state of Veracruz. It is located in the state's Huasteca Alta region. The municipal seat is the village of Chiconamel, Veracruz.

In the 2005 INEGI Census, the municipality reported a total population of 6,811, of whom 1,517 lived in the municipal seat. Of the municipality's inhabitants, 3,902 (62%) spoke an indigenous language, primarily Nahuatl.

The municipality of Chiconamel covers a total surface area of 133.25 km^{2}. Unusually, however, the municipality is divided into two by an intervening portion of the municipality of Chalma, with the eastern portion of its territory an exclave.

== Settlements in the municipality ==
- Chiconamel (municipal seat; 2005 population 1,517)
- Motoltepec (population 750)
- Tancazahuela (1,550)
- Los Venados (450)
