= Higo =

Higo may refer to:

- Higo Province, old province in what is now Kumamoto Prefecture, Japan
- Higo Ko-ryu, Japanese koryū martial art
- Higo Magalhães (born 1982), Brazilian football manager and former defensive midfielder
- Higo (footballer) (born 1986), Higo Seara Santos de Oliveira, Brazilian football midfielder
- Leandro Higo (born 1989), Brazilian mixed martial artist

== See also ==
- El Higo (disambiguation)
