= Patricio Chirinos del Ángel =

Mexican politician

- Born: 28 January 1968; Tempoal de Sánchez, Veracruz, Mexico
- Died: 31 December 2025 (aged 57); Tempoal de Sánchez, Veracruz, Mexico
- Occupation: Politician
- Political party: PRI

Patricio Chirinos del Ángel (Note: In this Mexican name, the surname is Chirinos and the second or maternal family name is del Ángel.) (28 January 1968 – 31 December 2025) was a Mexican politician from the Institutional Revolutionary Party (PRI).

He served as municipal president of Tempoal, Veracruz, in 2001–2004, and was elected to the Congress of Veracruz in 2007. In the 2009 mid-terms he was elected to the Chamber of Deputies to represent the first district of Veracruz during the 61st Congress.

Chirinos died in his home city of Tempoal de Sánchez on 31 December 2025.

== Family ==
He was the nephew of Patricio Chirinos Calero, who served as governor of Veracruz from 1992 to 1998.
