= Tampico Alto (municipality) =

- Municipality
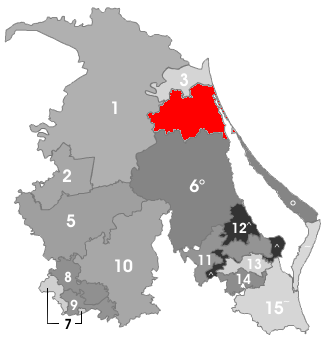
- Municipality of Tampico Alto in the Huasteca Alta of Veracruz

- Location in Mexico
- Coordinates: 22°07′0″N 97°48′0″W
- Country: Mexico
- State: Veracruz
- Municipal seat: Tampico Alto

Government
  - Municipal President: Salvador Mellado Villalobos (AFV), 2008-10
  - Federal electoral district: Veracruz's 1st

Area
  - Total: 1,027.35 km^{2} (396.66 sq mi)
- Elevation: 20 m (66 ft)

Population (2005)
  - Total: 11,971
  - Density: 11.652/km^{2} (30.179/sq mi)
- Time zone: UTC-6 (Zona Centro)
- Website: www.tampicoalto.gob.mx

Tampico Alto is a municipality of the Mexican state of Veracruz. It is located in the state's Huasteca Alta region, at the northern end of Tamiahua Lagoon. The municipal seat is also called Tampico Alto.

In the 2005 INEGI Census, the municipality reported a total population of 11,971 (down from 14,684 in 1980), of whom 2,126 lived in the municipal seat. Of the municipality's inhabitants, 129 spoke an indigenous language, primarily Wastek (Huasteco).

Tampico Alto Municipality covers a total surface area of 1,027.35 km^{2}.

== Settlements in the municipality ==
- Tampico Alto (municipal seat; 2005 population 2,126)
- Brecha Huasteca (population 3,000)
- La Ribera (2,500)
- Llano de Bustos (2,000)
- Las Chacas (519)
