= Pueblo Viejo Municipality, Veracruz =

Pueblo Viejo
- Municipality
- Coat of arms

- Location within Veracruz Location within Mexico
- Coordinates: 22°11′0″N 97°50′0″W
- Country: Mexico
- State: Veracruz
- Municipal seat: Ciudad Cuauhtémoc

Government
  - Municipal President: Tomas Castillo Rivera (AFV), 2008-10
  - Federal electoral district: Veracruz's 1st

Area
  - Total: 286.24 km^{2} (110.52 sq mi)
- Elevation: 10 m (33 ft)

Population (2005)
  - Total: 52,593
  - Density: 183.74/km^{2} (475.88/sq mi)
- Time zone: UTC-6 (Zona Centro)

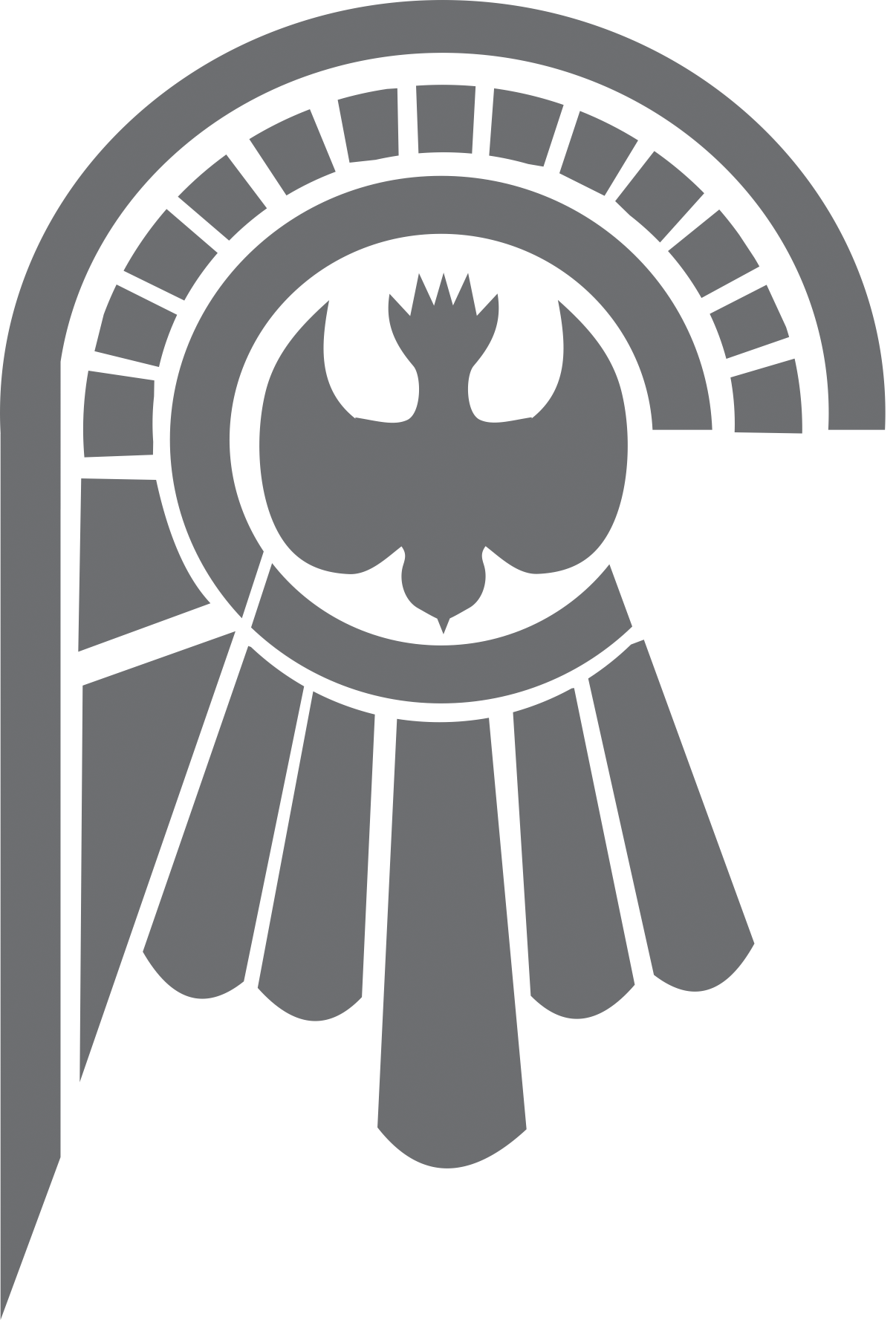
Municipal coat of arms of Pueblo Viejo

Pueblo Viejo is a municipality in the Mexican state of Veracruz. It is located in the state's Huasteca Alta region. The municipal seat is the city of Ciudad Cuauhtémoc.

== Geography ==
The municipality covers a total area of 286.24 km^{2} (110.52 sq mi) and is located on Federal Highway 123. It borders with the state of Tamaulipas and the municipality of Pánuco to the north and west, with the Gulf of Mexico to the east, and with Tampico Alto to the south.

== Demographics ==
In the 2005 INEGI Census, the municipality reported a total population of 52,593 (up from 48,054 in 1995), of whom 8,950 lived in the municipal seat. Of the municipality's inhabitants, 553 (1.2%) spoke an indigenous language, primarily Nahuatl; 0.32% of the total population spoke no Spanish.

== Settlements ==
The municipal seat of Pueblo Viejo is not its largest centre of population. Of the municipality's 73 settlements, the largest are:

- Benito Juárez (2005 population: 14,015)
- Anáhuac (13,657)
- Cd. Cuauhtémoc (municipal seat; 8,950)
- Hidalgo (6,159)
- Primero de Mayo (Los Mangos) (5,068)
