= Patricio Chirinos =

Patricio Chirinos may refer to:

- Patricio Chirinos Calero (born 1937), Mexican politician, governor of Veracruz in 1992–1998
- Patricio Chirinos del Ángel (1968–2025), Mexican politician, federal deputy in 2009–2012
