= El Higo =

El Higo may refer to:

- El Higo, Veracruz, Mexico
- El Higo Municipality, Veracruz, Mexico
- El Higo, Panama
