= Rocío Guzmán de Paz =

Mexican politician

- Born: 14 October 1960 (age 65); Veracruz, Mexico
- Education: Universidad Regiomontana
- Occupation: Politician
- Political party: PAN

Rocío Guzmán de Paz (born 14 October 1960) is a Mexican politician affiliated with the National Action Party (PAN). In the 2003 mid-terms she was elected to the Chamber of Deputies to represent the first district of Veracruz during the 59th Congress.
