= Pedro Pulido Pecero =

Mexican politician

- Born: 23 July 1969 (age 56); Veracruz, Mexico
- Occupation: Politician
- Political party: PAN

Pedro Pulido Pecero (born 23 July 1969) is a Mexican politician from the National Action Party (PAN). In the 2006 general election he was elected to the Chamber of Deputies to represent the first district of Veracruz during the 60th Congress.
