= Platón Sánchez (municipality) =

- Municipality
- Location in Veracruz
- Coordinates: 21°17′0″N 98°22′0″W
- Country: Mexico
- State: Veracruz
- Municipal seat: Platón Sánchez
- Municipality created: 1868

Government
  - Municipal President: Teodoro Hernández Hernández (Conv.), 2008-10

Area
  - Total: 227.84 km^{2} (87.97 sq mi)
- Elevation: 60 m (200 ft)

Population (2005)
  - Total: 17,670
  - Density: 77.55/km^{2} (200.9/sq mi)

Platón Sánchez is a municipality in the Mexican state of Veracruz. It is located in the state's Huasteca Alta region. The municipal seat is the town of Platón Sánchez.

== Geography ==
The municipality covers a total area of 227.84 km^{2} (87.97 sq mi) and is located on Federal Highway 105.

=== Borders ===
It borders on the municipalities of Tempoal (north), Tantoyuca (east), Chalma (south) and Chiconamel (south-east). To the south it borders on the state of Hidalgo.

== Products ==
Major products are corn, cereal, sugar, and fruits.

== Demographics ==
In the 2005 INEGI Census, the municipality reported a total population of 17,670 (down from 18,229 in 1995), of whom 10,009 lived in the municipal seat. Of the municipality's inhabitants, 5,633 (33%) spoke an indigenous language, primarily Nahuatl; 6.14% of the municipality's population did not speak Spanish.

== Settlements ==
There are 127 settlements in the municipality. The largest ones are:

- Platón Sánchez (municipal seat; 2005 population 10,009)
- Ahitic (population 568)
- Plalpani (514)
- Monte Grande (460)
- Corralillo (432)

== History ==
The municipality's name honours Rafael Platón Sánchez (1831–1867), a native of the area who fought in the Battle of Puebla of 5 May 1862 and later chaired the court martial that sentenced Emperor Maximilian and his generals Miguel Miramón and Tomás Mejía to death by firing squad in Santiago de Querétaro on 19 June 1867. The municipality was established with Platón Sánchez's name in 1868.

In 1938 Platón Sánchez (together with Chiconamel) lost territory which then formed the new municipality of Chalma.
