= Chiconamel =

- Village and municipal seat
- Location within Veracruz Location within Mexico
- Coordinates: 21°14′0″N 98°27′0″W
- Country: Mexico
- State: Veracruz
- Municipality: Chiconamel
- Settled (Aztecs): 1508
- Village status: 20 June 1934

Government
  - Federal electoral district: Veracruz's 1st

Population (2005)
  - Total: 1,517
- Time zone: UTC-6 (Zona Centro)

Chiconamel is a village (pueblo) in the Mexican state of Veracruz. It is located in the state's Huasteca Alta region. It serves as the municipal seat for the surrounding municipality of Chiconamel.

In the 2005 INEGI Census, the village of Chiconamel reported a total population of 1,517.
