= List of storms named Dolly =

The name Dolly has been used for fourteen tropical cyclones worldwide.

In the Atlantic Ocean:

- Hurricane Dolly (1953) – strong hurricane that weakened rapidly before passing over Bermuda
- Hurricane Dolly (1954) – stayed far from land
- Hurricane Dolly (1968) – moved up the east coast of the United States but did not make landfall
- Tropical Storm Dolly (1974) – did not strike land
- Hurricane Dolly (1996) – made landfall at Quintana Roo, Mexico and again at Tamaulipas, Mexico
- Tropical Storm Dolly (2002) – never threatened land
- Hurricane Dolly (2008) – Category 2 hurricane that caused $1.5 billion in damage to Texas and Mexico
- Tropical Storm Dolly (2014) – made landfall in Mexico
- Tropical Storm Dolly (2020) – formed off the coast of the United States as a subtropical depression
- Tropical Storm Dolly (2026) – did not threaten land

In the West Pacific Ocean:

- Typhoon Dolly (1946) – made landfall in China's Zhejiang province

In the Australian region:

- Tropical Cyclone Dolly (1965) – never impacted land

In the South-West Indian Ocean:

- Tropical Storm Dolly (1972) – developed off the coast of Madagascar that later grazed Réunion

In the South Pacific Ocean:

- Cyclone Dolly (1970) – a Category 3 severe tropical cyclone that minimal affected Vanuatu
