= Zita Beatriz Pazzi =

Mexican politician

- Born: 12 April 1956 (age 70); Pánuco, Veracruz, Mexico
- Occupation: Deputy
- Political party: PRI

Zita Beatriz Pazzi Maza (born 12 April 1956) is a Mexican politician affiliated with the Institutional Revolutionary Party (PRI).

In the 2012 general election she was elected to the Chamber of Deputies to represent the first district of Veracruz during the 62nd Congress.
