= Platón Sánchez, Veracruz =

Platón Sánchez
- Town & municipal seat
- Location in Veracruz
- Coordinates: 21°17′0″N 98°22′0″W
- Country: Mexico
- State: Veracruz
- Municipality: Platón Sánchez
- Town status: 1958

Government
  - Municipal President: Teodoro Hernández Hernández (Conv.), 2008-10
  - Federal electoral district: Veracruz's 1st
- Elevation: 60 m (200 ft)

Population (2005)
  - Total: 10,009
- Time zone: UTC-6 (Zona Centro)

Platón Sánchez is a town (villa) in the Mexican state of Veracruz. It is located in the state's Huasteca Alta region. It serves as the municipal seat for the surrounding municipality of Platón Sánchez.

In the 2005 INEGI Census, the town reported a total population of 10,009.

The town's name honours Rafael Platón Sánchez (1831–1867), a native of the area who fought in the Battle of Puebla of 5 May 1862 and later chaired the court martial that sentenced Emperor Maximilian and his generals Miguel Miramón and Tomás Mejía to death by firing squad in Santiago de Querétaro on 19 June 1867.
