= El Higo (municipality) =

- Municipality
- Location within Veracruz Location within Mexico
- Coordinates: 21°46′0″N 98°27′0″W
- Country: Mexico
- State: Veracruz
- Municipal seat: El Higo
- Municipality created: 25 November 1988

Area
  - Total: 356.94 km^{2} (137.82 sq mi)
- Elevation: 20 m (66 ft)

Population (2005)
  - Total: 18,392
  - Density: 51.527/km^{2} (133.45/sq mi)
- Time zone: UTC-6
- Website: http://elhigo.emunicipios.gob.mx/

El Higo is a municipality of the Mexican state of Veracruz. It is located in the state's Huasteca Alta region. The municipal seat is the village of El Higo, Veracruz.

In the 2005 INEGI Census, the municipality reported a total population of 18,392, of whom 7,844 lived in the municipal seat. Of the municipality's inhabitants, 218 spoke an indigenous language, primarily Nahuatl.

The municipality of El Higo covers a total surface area of 356.94 km^{2}. It was created on 25 November 1988, from the municipality of Tempoal.

== Settlements in the municipality ==
- El Higo (municipal seat; 2005 population 7,844)
- El Pueblito (population 1,022)
- El Hoxton (698)
- Bella Vista (689)

== Municipal presidents ==
Since the municipality's creation, the following individuals have held the position of municipal president (mayor):

- 1988–1991: municipal council (no mayor)
- 1992–1994: Víctor Lara González (PRI)
- 1995–1997: Juvencio Goldaracena Zavala (PRI)
- 1998–2000: Jorge Zumaya Hernández (PRD)
- 2001–2004: Evencio de la Garza Rivera (PVEM)
- 2005–2007: Leonel Meraz Duval (PAN)
