= Tampico International Airport =

International airport in Tampico, Tamaulipas, Mexico

Tampico International Airport Aeropuerto Internacional de Tampico
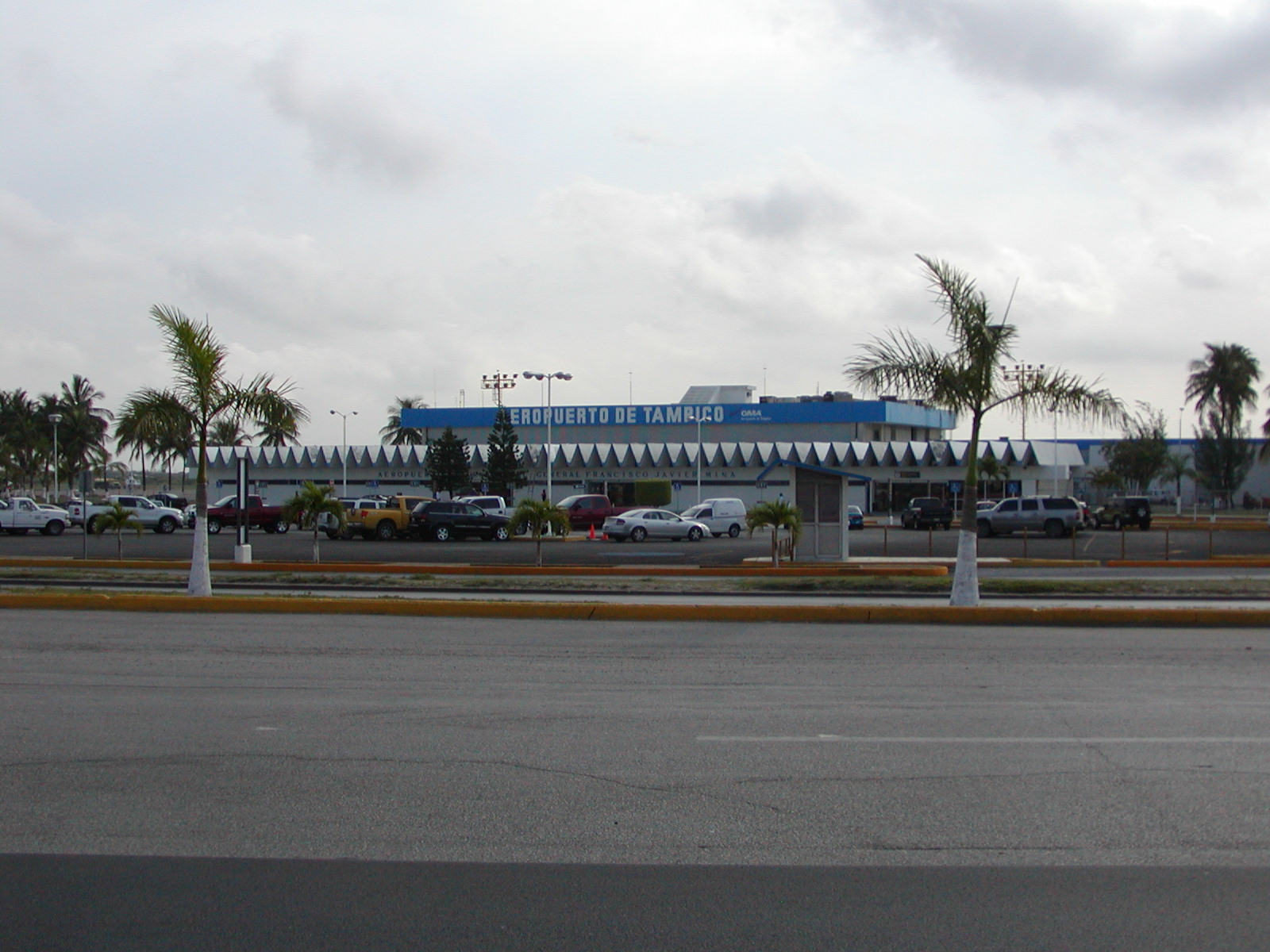
- IATA: TAM; ICAO: MMTM

Summary
- Airport type: Public
- Operator: Grupo Aeroportuario Centro Norte
- Serves: Tampico, Tamaulipas, Mexico
- Opened: 1929
- Time zone: CST (UTC-06:00)
- Elevation AMSL: 24 m (79 ft)
- Coordinates: 22°17′47″N 097°51′57″W
- Website: www.oma.aero/en/passengers/tampico/index.php

Map
- Location of the airport in Tamaulipas TAM (Mexico)

Runways
| Direction | Length | | Surface |
| Direction | m | ft | Surface |
|---|---|---|---|
| 09/27 | 1,200 | 3,937 | Asphalt |
| 13/31 | 2,550 | 8,366 | Asphalt |
| 18/36 | 1,300 | 4,265 | Asphalt |

Statistics (2025)
- Total passengers: 609,476
- Ranking in Mexico: 36th ▲1
- Source: Grupo Aeroportuario Centro Norte.

Tampico International Airport (Spanish: Aeropuerto Internacional de Tampico); officially Aeropuerto Internacional General Francisco Javier Mina (General Francisco Javier Mina International Airport) (IATA: TAM, ICAO: MMTM) is an international airport situated in Tampico, Tamaulipas, Mexico. It manages air traffic for the metropolitan area of Tampico, including Ciudad Madero and Altamira, handling both national and international flights. The airport also accommodates military facilities and supports logistics, cargo, flight training, and general aviation activities. Operated by Grupo Aeroportuario Centro Norte, it is named after General Javier Mina, a key figure in Mexico's War of Independence.

Formerly known as Campo de Aviación George Lawrence Rihl, the airport was inaugurated in October 1929. It operated the first commercial flight in the history of Mexico, conducted by Compañía Mexicana de Aviación, with its destination set for Mexico City. Tampico Airport is one of the few airports in Mexico equipped with three runways, sharing this distinction with Chihuahua and Mexico City-AIFA. It ranks as the second busiest airport in northeastern Mexico, after Monterrey Airport, handling 560,679 passengers in 2024 and 609,476 in 2025.

== Facilities ==
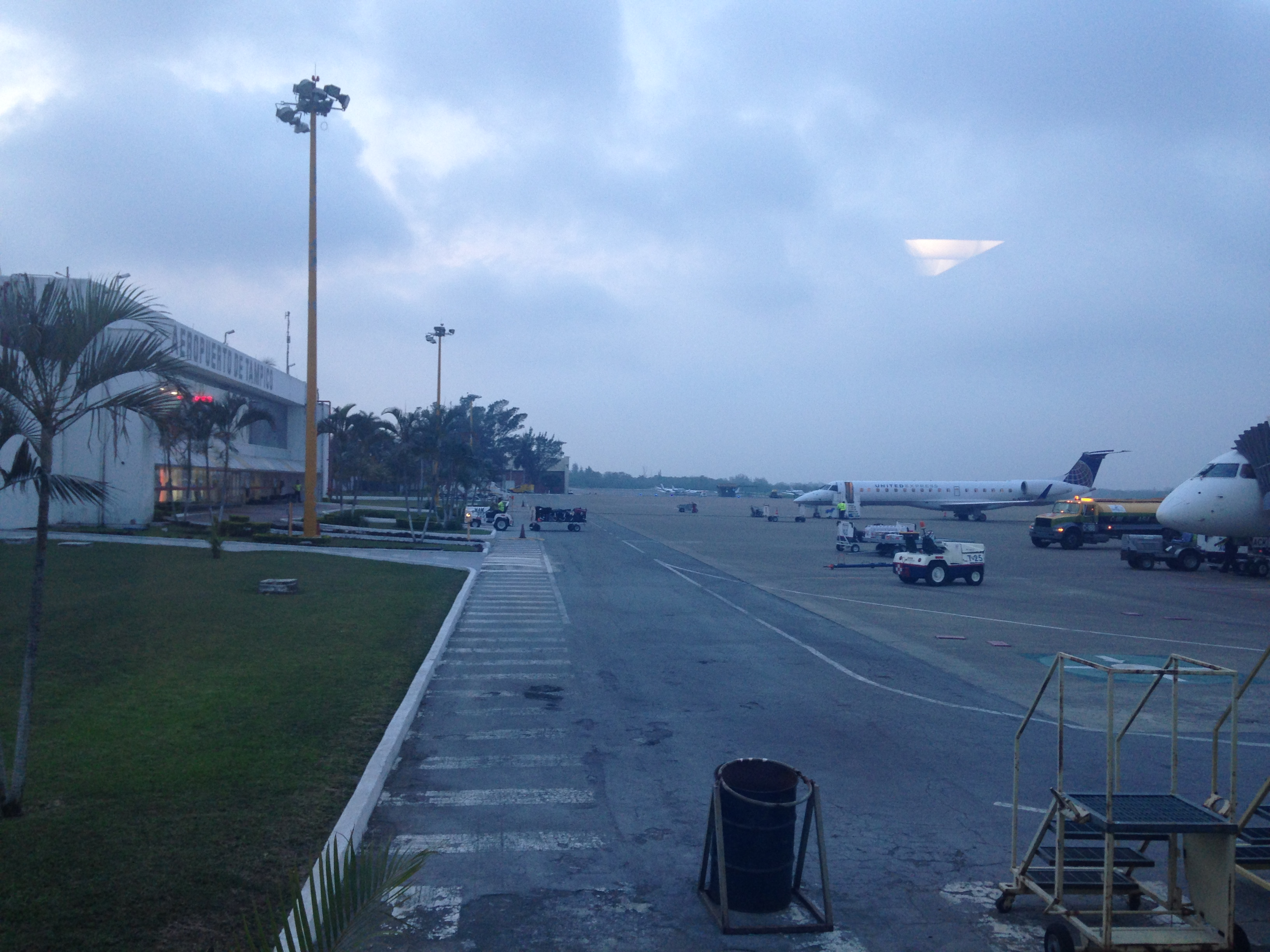
Passenger terminal airside

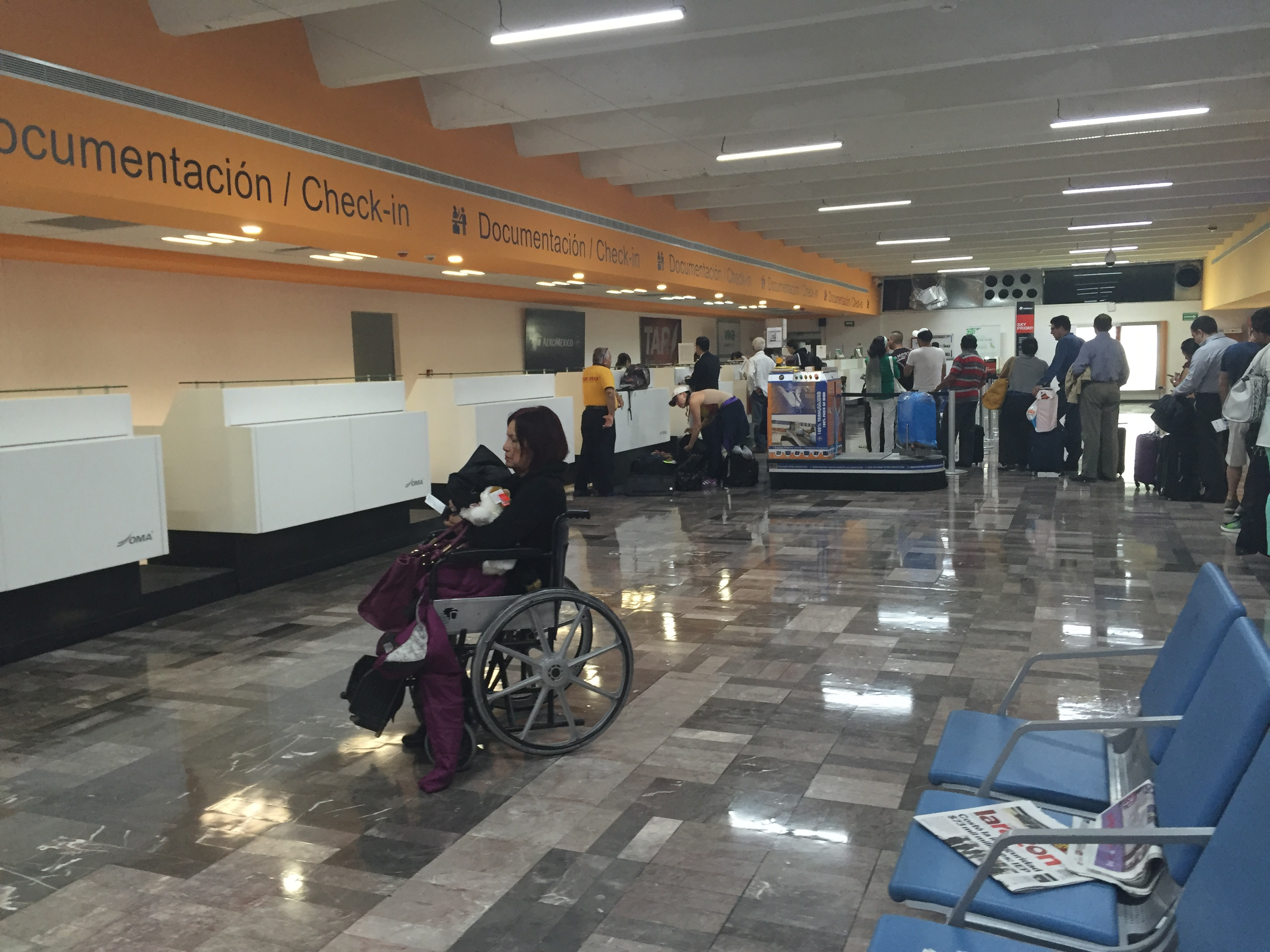
Check-in area

The airport is located within the Tampico urban area, approximately 8 kilometres (5 mi) north of the city center. Covering a total area of 391 hectares (966 acres) at an elevation of 24 metres (79 ft) above sea level, it features three asphalt-surfaced runways: Runway 13/31, the primary one measuring 2,550 metres (8,366 ft), Runway 09/27 at 1,200 metres (3,937 ft), and Runway 18/36 spanning 1,300 metres (4,265 ft). It was the first in the country to be equipped with an instrument landing system (ILS). The airport's commercial aviation apron provides seven parking positions for narrow-body aircraft, and an adjacent general aviation apron caters to fixed-wing aircraft and heliports for private aviation.

The passenger terminal is a two-story building that facilitates both domestic and international flights. On the ground floor, it houses check-in and arrivals facilities, including customs and immigration, baggage claim, car rental services, taxi stands, and snack bars. The upper floor of the terminal accommodates the security checkpoint and a departure area containing duty-free shops, a VIP lounge, and a departures concourse featuring six gates, two of which are equipped with jet bridges.

Adjacent to the terminal, there are other facilities, including civil aviation hangars, cargo companies, and courier services. Additionally, there is a dedicated general aviation terminal that supports a variety of activities, including flight training, executive, and general aviation.

Air Force Station No. 4 (Spanish: Estación Aérea Militar N.º 4) (E.A.M. 4), located on the airport's grounds, is a facility of the Mexican Air Force. Currently, there are no active squadrons assigned to it. The station comprises a 10,000 square metres (107,639 sq ft) apron, a hangar, and other facilities intended for the accommodation of Air Force personnel.

== Airlines and destinations ==
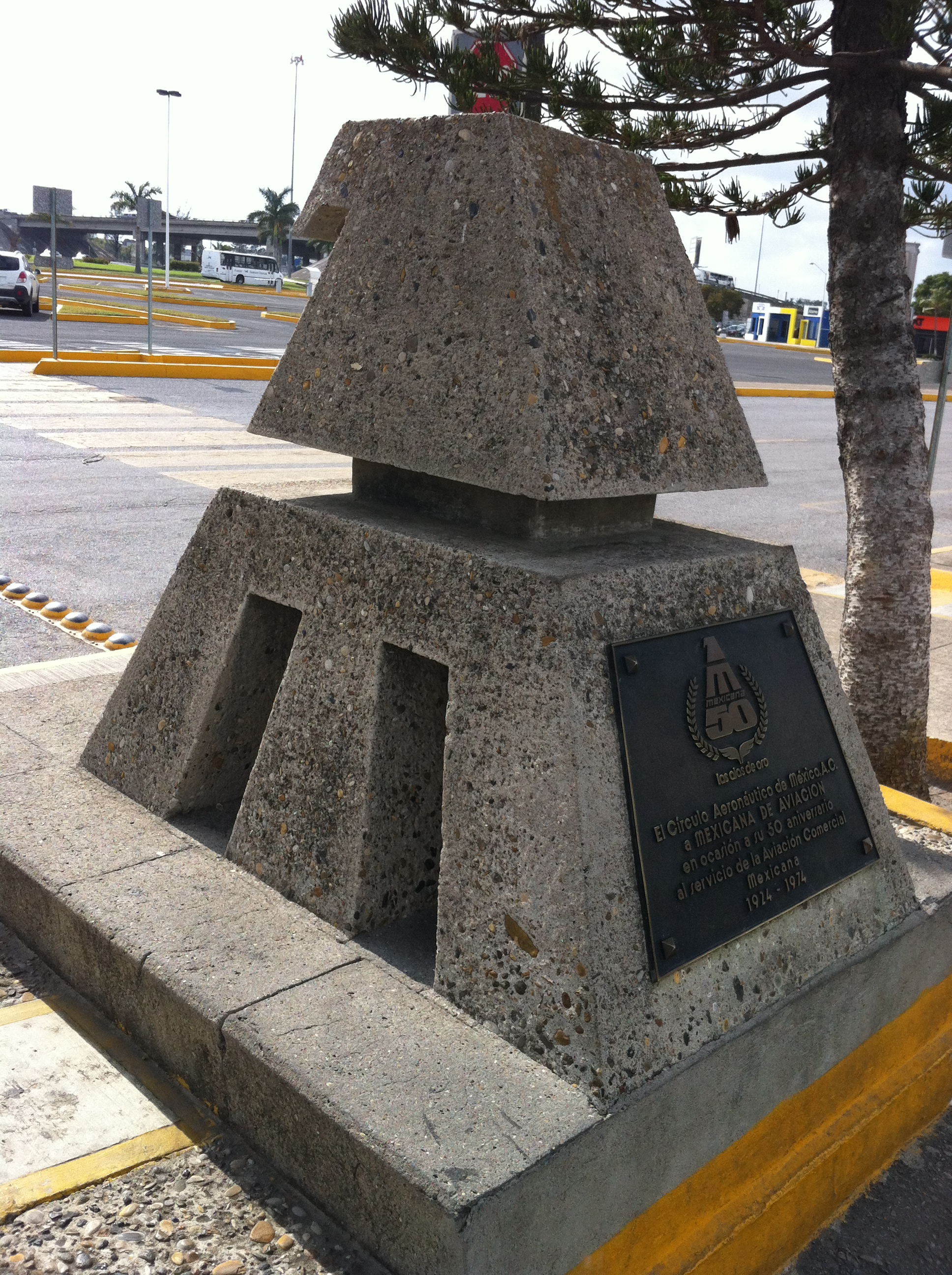
Monument sculpture commemorating 50 years of Mexicana de Aviación at Tampico Airport

=== Passenger ===
| Airlines | Destinations |
|---|---|
| Aeroméxico | Mexico City–Benito Juárez |
| Aeroméxico Connect | Mexico City–Benito Juárez |
| Aerus | Mexico City–Felipe Ángeles, Monterrey, Veracruz |
| American Eagle | Dallas/Fort Worth |
| United | Houston-Intercontinental |
| Viva | Cancún, Mexico City–Felipe Ángeles, Monterrey, Nuevo Laredo (begins November 14, 2026), Villahermosa |

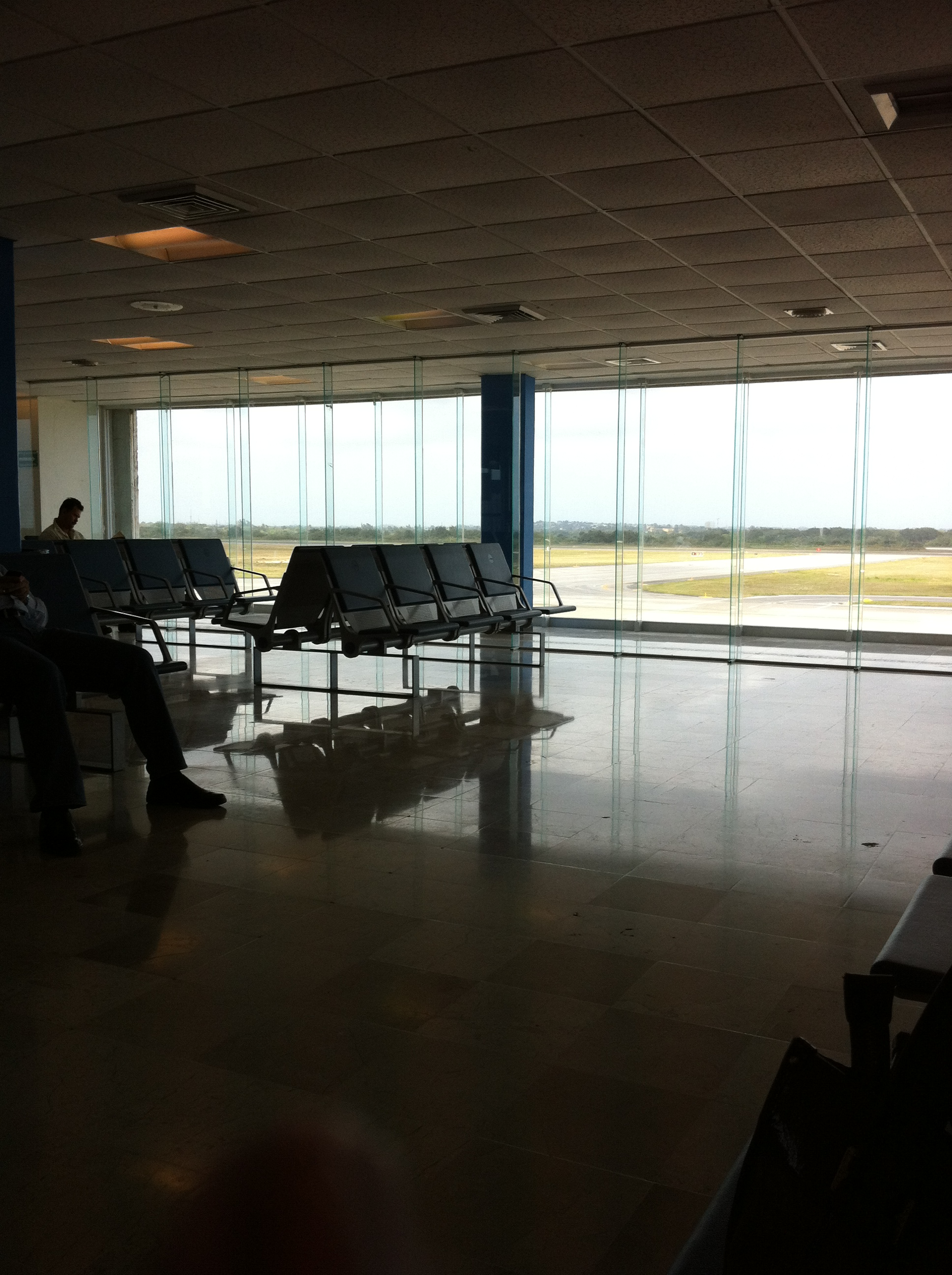
Departures concourse

=== Destination maps ===
Domestic destinations from Tampico International Airport
Red = Year-round destination
Blue = Future destination
Green = Seasonal destination
International destinations from Tampico International Airport
Red = Year-round destination
Blue = Future destination
Green = Seasonal destination

== Statistics ==
=== Annual Traffic ===
Passenger statistics at TAM
| Year | Total Passengers | change % |
|---|---|---|
| 2008 | 582,328 | Steady |
| 2009 | 470,304 | ▼19.23% |
| 2010 | 451,005 | ▼4.10% |
| 2011 | 548,083 | ▲21.52% |
| 2012 | 594,797 | ▲8.53% |
| 2013 | 608,813 | ▲2.36% |
| 2014 | 688,893 | ▲13.16% |
| 2015 | 763,744 | ▲10.86% |
| 2016 | 717,599 | ▼6.04% |
| 2017 | 717,342 | ▼0.04% |
| 2018 | 736,627 | ▲2.69% |
| 2019 | 739,143 | ▲0.34% |
| 2020 | 270,835 | ▼63.39% |
| 2021 | 397,191 | ▲46.66% |
| 2022 | 495,602 | ▲24.78% |
| 2023 | 563,204 | ▲13.64% |
| 2024 | 560,679 | ▼0.45% |
| 2025 | 609,476 | ▲8.71% |

=== Busiest routes ===
Busiest domestic routes from TAM (Jan–Dec 2025)
| Rank | Airport | Passengers |
|---|---|---|
| 1 | Mexico City, Mexico City | 140,405 |
| 2 | Monterrey, Nuevo León | 59,299 |
| 3 | Mexico City–AIFA, State of Mexico | 26,356 |
| 4 | Houston–Intercontinental, United States | 27,197 |
| 5 | Cancún, Quintana Roo | 19,365 |
| 6 | Dallas/Fort Worth, United States | 14,063 |
| 7 | Guadalajara, Jalisco | 9,713 |
| 8 | Villahermosa, Tabasco | 889 |

== See also ==
- List of the busiest airports in Mexico
- List of airports in Mexico
- List of airports by ICAO code: M
- List of busiest airports in North America
- List of the busiest airports in Latin America
- Transportation in Mexico
- Tourism in Mexico
- Grupo Aeroportuario Centro Norte
- List of Mexican military installations
- Mexican Air Force
