= Tampico Alto =

- Town and municipal seat
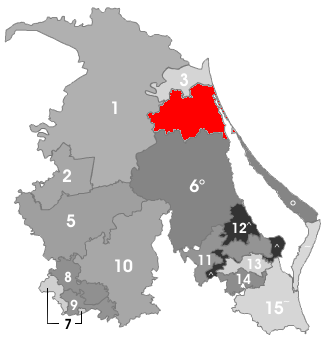
- Municipality of Tampico Alto in the Huasteca Alta of Veracruz

- Location in Mexico
- Coordinates: 22°07′0″N 97°48′0″W
- Country: Mexico
- State: Veracruz
- Municipality: Tampico Alto

Government
  - Federal electoral district: Veracruz's 1st
- Elevation: 20 m (66 ft)

Population (2005)
  - Total: 2,126
- Time zone: UTC-6 (Zona Centro)
- Website: www.tampicoalto.gob.mx

Tampico Alto is a town in the Mexican state of Veracruz. Located in the state's Huasteca Alta region, it serves as the municipal seat of the surrounding municipality of Tampico Alto.

In the 2005 INEGI Census, Tampico Alto reported a population of 2,126.
