= El Higo, Veracruz =

El Higo
- Village
- Location within Veracruz Location within Mexico
- Coordinates: 21°46′0″N 98°27′0″W
- Country: Mexico
- State: Veracruz
- Municipality: El Higo
- Settled: late 19th century

Government
  - Federal electoral district: Veracruz's 1st
- Elevation: 20 m (66 ft)

Population (2005)
  - Total: 7,844
- Time zone: UTC-6 (Zona Centro)

El Higo is a village in the Mexican state of Veracruz. Located in the state's Huasteca Alta region, it serves as the seat of the surrounding municipality El Higo .

In the 2005 INEGI Census, the village of El Higo reported a total population of 7,844.
