= Chalma, Veracruz =

- Village
- Location in Mexico Chalma, Veracruz (Mexico)
- Coordinates: 21°13′0″N 98°24′0″W
- Country: Mexico
- State: Veracruz
- Municipality: Chalma
- Settled: Pre-Conquest
- Village status: 20 June 1934

Government
  - Federal electoral district: Veracruz's 1st
- Elevation: 140 m (460 ft)

Population (2005)
  - Total: 2,555
- Time zone: UTC-6 (Zona Centro)

Chalma is a village (pueblo) in the Mexican state of Veracruz. It is located in the state's Huasteca Alta region. It serves as the municipal seat for the surrounding municipality of Chalma.

In the 2005 INEGI Census, the village of Chalma reported a total population of 2,555.
