= Platón Sánchez =

Mexican army officer (1831–1867)

Rafael Platón Sánchez Meraz (Note: In this Spanish name, the first or paternal surname is Sánchez and the second or maternal family name is Meraz.) (15 October 1831 – 30 November 1867) was an artillery officer in the Mexican Army in the mid-19th century. During the French intervention of 1861–1867, he fought in the Battle of Puebla (1862) and the Siege of Querétaro (1867), and he presided over the court-martial that sentenced Emperor Maximilian I of Mexico to death, along with his generals Tomás Mejía and Miguel Miramón, in June 1867.

== Early life ==
Platón Sánchez was born on the Hacienda de Capadero, in the modern-day municipality of Platón Sánchez, Veracruz, on 15 October 1831. His parents, Anastacio Sánchez and Gertrudis (or Josefa) Meraz, died when he was five years old and he was raised by a maternal aunt in nearby Huejutla (in the modern-day state of Hidalgo). He enrolled in the Military Academy in Mexico City at the age of 22, where he graduated four years later as a second lieutenant of artillery.

== Military career ==
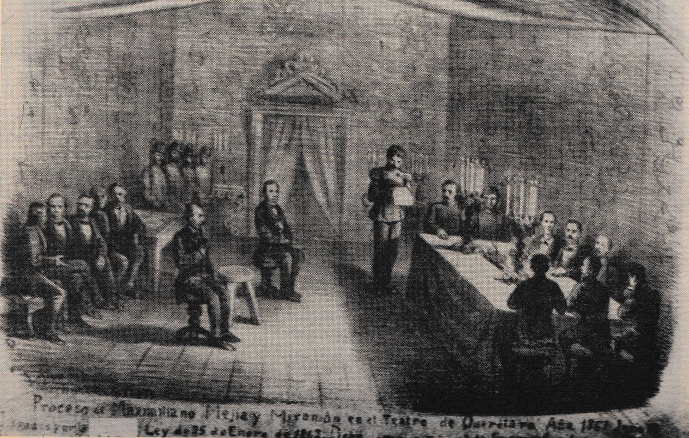
Trial of Maxmilian, Mejía and Miramón in Santiago de Querétaro.

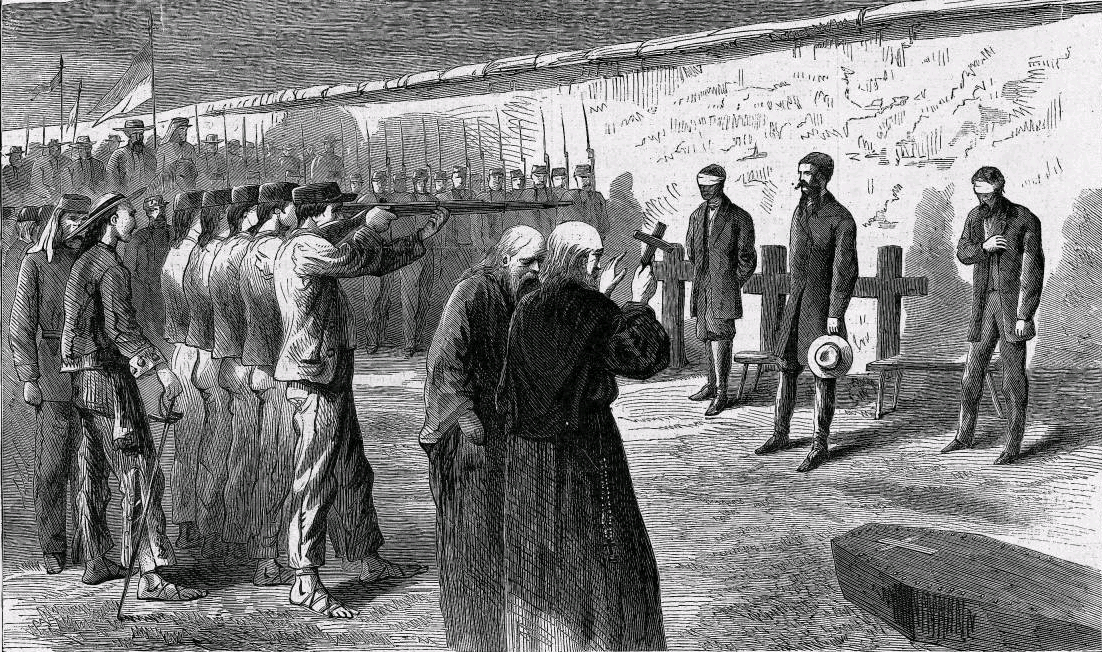
Execution of Maximilian and his generals, 19 June 1867.

Sánchez was one of the few artillery officers to align themselves with the liberal faction during the Reform War of 1857–1861. (Note: Leandro Valle was another.)

During the Second French intervention (1861–1867), he fought in the Battle of Puebla on 5 May 1862 and in the siege of the same city the following year, during which he was wounded. He was captured by the French but managed to escape, and rejoined the ranks of the army in Mexico City. Now promoted to captain, he accompanied President Benito Juárez on his campaigns in the north of the country, engaging the French and their supporters at Saltillo, Monterrey and Matamoros. He was captured by the enemy in 1865 but again managed to escape.

In 1867, Sánchez fought in the Siege of Querétaro, the conclusive engagement of the war, and was promoted to lieutenant-colonel. Following the breaking of the siege on 14 May, Emperor Maximilian was taken captive and, on 12 June, Juárez ordered a court-martial (consejo de guerra) to try him and his generals. Sánchez was instructed by General Mariano Escobedo to preside over the proceedings, which began the following day at the city's Teatro Iturbide. (Note: The court was composed of Sánchez and six Army captains; Manuel de Aspiroz, as the judge-advocate, led the prosecution. Maximilian's defence attorneys included Mariano Riva Palacio and Rafael Martínez de la Torre.) On 14 June he read out the court's verdict and sentence of death against Maximilian and his generals Tomás Mejía and Miguel Miramón, which was carried out by firing squad on the Cerro de las Campanas in Querétaro on the morning of 19 June.

== Death ==
In November 1867, Platón Sánchez was in charge of a group of new hunter corps recruits at the Hacienda de Nopalillos in Galeana, Nuevo León. On 30 November, they rebelled against Juárez's government and killed their commander.

== Legacy ==
On 24 August 1868, the state of Veracruz created the municipality of Platón Sánchez from the Hacienda de Capadero and two neighbouring estates; the municipal seat also bears his name. In 1967, the centenary of his death, the Congress of Veracruz ordered the nearby city of Tempoal renamed Tempoal de Sánchez, where a statue stands in his honour.
