= Chalma (municipality) =

- Municipality
- Location within Veracruz Location within Mexico
- Coordinates: 21°13′0″N 98°24′0″W
- Country: Mexico
- State: Veracruz
- Municipal seat: Chalma
- Municipality created: 1 November 1938

Government
  - Federal electoral district: Veracruz's 1st

Area
  - Total: 199.05 km^{2} (76.85 sq mi)
- Elevation: 140 m (460 ft)

Population (2005)
  - Total: 13,067
  - Density: 65.647/km^{2} (170.02/sq mi)
- Time zone: UTC-6 (Zona Centro)
- Website: https://chalmaver.gob.mx/wp/

Chalma is a municipality in the Mexican state of Veracruz.

== Geography ==
It is located in the state's Huasteca Alta region. The municipal seat is the village of Chalma, Veracruz.

The municipality of Chalma covers a total surface area of 199.05 km^{2} (76.85 sq mi).

=== Settlements in the municipality ===
- Chalma (municipal seat; 2005 population 2,555)
- Chapopote (population 2,916)
- San Pedro Coyutla (1,396)
- El Pintor (925)
- La Laja (360)
- Aquixcuatitla (200)

== Demographics ==
In the 2005 INEGI Census, the municipality reported a total population of 13,067, of whom 2,555 lived in the municipal seat. Of the municipality's inhabitants, 4,992 spoke an indigenous language, primarily Nahuatl.
