= Tempoal (municipality) =

- Municipality
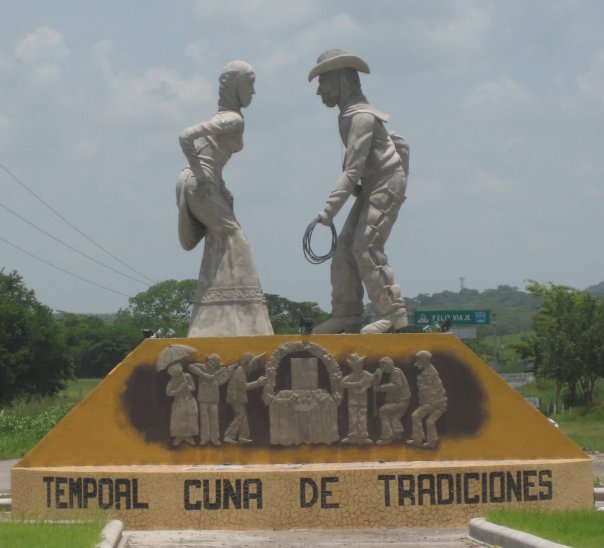
- Welcome sign

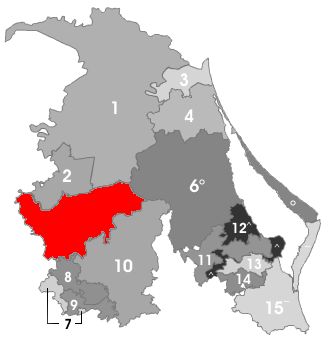
- Municipality of Tempoal in the Huasteca Alta of Veracruz

- Location within Veracruz Location within Mexico
- Coordinates: 21°31′0″N 98°23′0″W
- Country: Mexico
- State: Veracruz
- Municipal seat: Tempoal de Sánchez

Government
  - Federal electoral district: Veracruz's 1st

Area
  - Total: 1,487.15 km^{2} (574.19 sq mi)
- Elevation: 50 m (160 ft)

Population (2005)
  - Total: 33,107
  - Density: 22.262/km^{2} (57.658/sq mi)
- Time zone: UTC-6 (Zona Centro)
- Website: https://www.tempoal.gob.mx/

Tempoal is a municipality in the Mexican state of Veracruz. It is located in the state's Huasteca Alta region. The municipal seat is Tempoal de Sánchez.

In the 2005 INEGI Census, the municipality reported a total population of 33,107 (down from 35,600 in 1995), of whom 12,237 lived in the municipal seat.

Of the municipality's inhabitants, 3252 (9.33%) spoke an indigenous language, primarily Wastek (Huasteco); the municipality's name comes from the Wastek tam-puhal, meaning "place of toads".

The municipality of Tempoal covers a total surface area of 1,487.15 km^{2} (574.19 sq mi).

== Settlements in the municipality ==
- Tempoal (municipal seat; 2005 population 12,237)
- Corozal (population 2,000)
- El Aguacate Terrero (1,200)
- Horcón Potrero (1,100)
