= Tempoal de Sánchez, Veracruz =

Tempoal (Tempoal de Sánchez)
- City and municipal seat
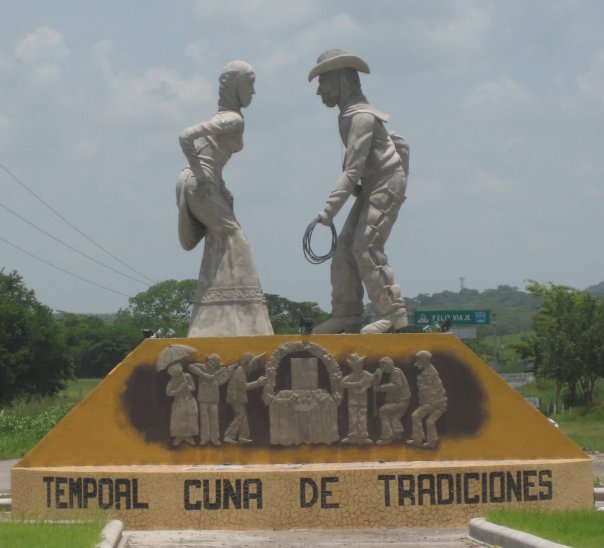

- Location within Veracruz Location within Mexico
- Coordinates: 21°31′0″N 98°23′0″W
- Country: Mexico
- State: Veracruz
- Municipality: Tempoal
- Settled: pre-Conquest
- Town status: 27 May 1927
- City status: 29 November 1927

Government
  - Federal electoral district: Veracruz's 1st
- Elevation: 50 m (160 ft)

Population (2005)
  - Total: 12,237
- Time zone: UTC-6 (Zona Centro)
- Postal code: 92060
- Area code: 789
- Demonym: Tempoalense
- Website: https://www.tempoal.gob.mx/

Tempoal (formally: Tempoal de Sánchez) is a city in the Mexican state of Veracruz. Located in the state's Huasteca Alta region, it serves as the municipal seat of the surrounding municipality of Tempoal.

In the 2005 INEGI Census, the city of Tempoal reported a total population of 12,237.

Tempoal is the terminus of Federal Highway 105, which runs through the Sierra Madre Oriental and across the state of Hidalgo to Pachuca, Hidalgo.

== Name ==
Tempoal comes from the Wastek Tam-puhal, meaning "place of toads". "De Sánchez" honours Rafael Platón Sánchez (1831–1867), a native of the area who fought in the Battle of Puebla of 5 May 1862 and later chaired the court martial that sentenced Emperor Maximilian and his generals Miguel Miramón and Tomás Mejía to death by firing squad in Santiago de Querétaro on 19 June 1867.

== History ==
Tempoal was founded in pre-Hispanic times. It was given town (villa) status in 1927 and city (ciudad) status in 1960.
