= Alianza Fidelidad por Veracruz =

Electoral coalition in Veracruz, Mexico

The Alianza Fidelidad por Veracruz ("Fidelity Alliance for Veracruz"; AFV) was an electoral coalition in the Mexican state of Veracruz.

The AFV was formed to fight the state and local elections of 2 September 2007 and was led by the Institutional Revolutionary Party (PRI) in alliance with the Ecologist Green Party of Mexico (PVEM), the Social Democratic and Peasant Alternative Party (PSD) and the New Alliance Party (PANAL). However, in some electoral districts and municipalities, PANAL and the PSD withdrew from the alliance and fielded their own candidates.

The coalition won 155 of the 212 municipal presidential races being fought in the election.

== See also ==
- es:Elecciones estatales de Veracruz (2007)
