= 1st federal electoral district of Veracruz =

Federal electoral district of Mexico

Veracruz's 1st
- Electoral district of the Chamber of Deputies of Mexico

- 1st district since 2023

Incumbent
- Member: Denisse Guzmán González
- Party: ▌Ecologist Green Party
- Congress: 66th (2024–2027)

District
- State: Veracruz
- Head town: Pánuco
- Coordinates: 22°03′N 98°11′W
- Covers: 15 municipalities: Chalma, Chiconamel, Chontla, Citlaltépetl, El Higo, Ixcatepec, Ozuluama, Platón Sánchez, Pueblo Viejo, Pánuco, Tamalín, Tampico Alto, Tantima, Tantoyuca, Tempoal
- PR region: Third
- Precincts: 355
- Population: 441,087 (2020 census)
- Indigenous: Yes (40%)

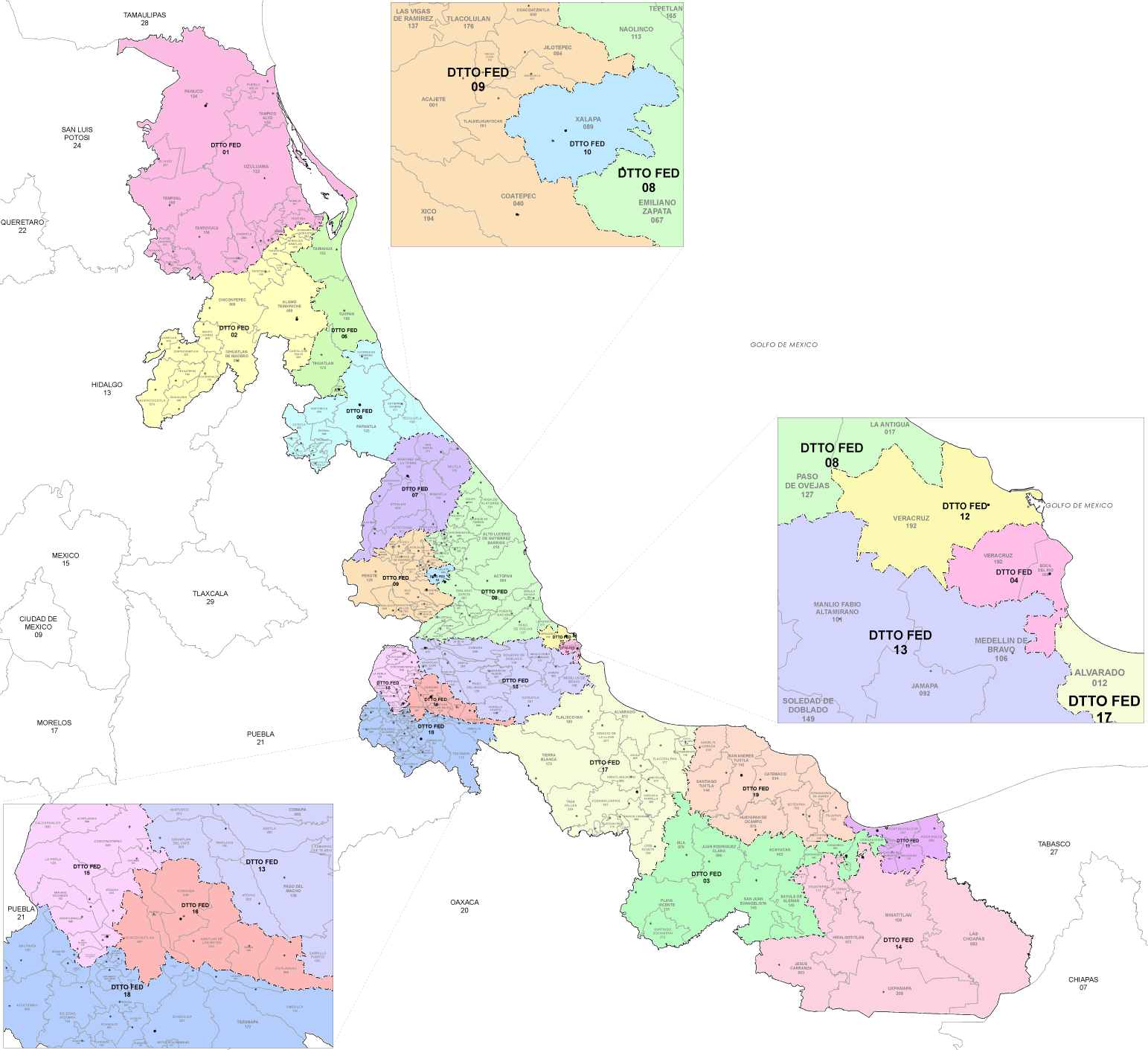
Federal electoral districts of Veracruz since 2023

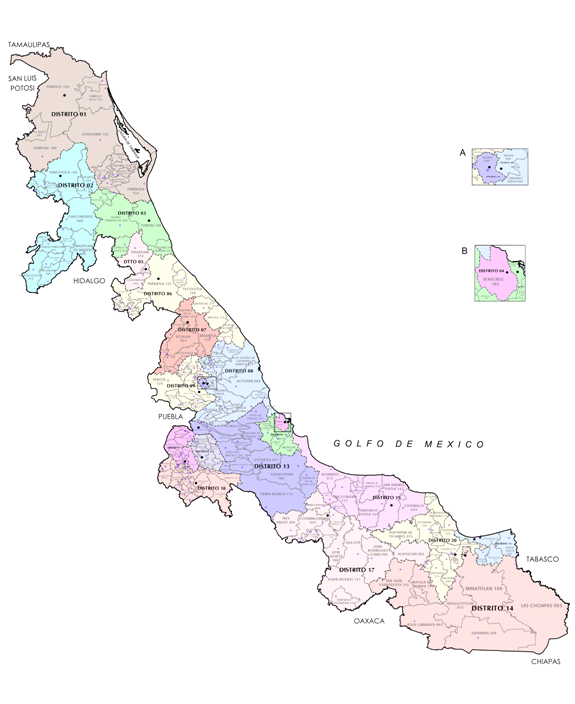
Veracruz under the 2017–2022 districting plan

The 1st federal electoral district of Veracruz (Spanish: Distrito electoral federal 01 de Veracruz) is one of the 300 electoral districts into which Mexico is divided for elections to the federal Chamber of Deputies and one of 19 such districts in the state of Veracruz.

It elects one deputy to the lower house of Congress for each three-year legislative session by means of the first-past-the-post system. Votes cast in the district also count towards the calculation of proportional representation ("plurinominal") deputies elected from the third region.

The current member for the district is Denisse Guzmán González of the Ecologist Green Party of Mexico (PVEM). She replaced María del Carmen Pinete Vargas, who was elected in the 2024 general election but died in office on 1 April 2025.

== District territory ==
Veracruz lost a congressional district in the 2023 districting plan adopted by the National Electoral Institute (INE), which is to be used for the 2024, 2027 and 2030 elections. The reconfigured 1st district covers 355 electoral precincts (secciones electorales) across 15 municipalities in the Huasteca Alta region in the extreme north of the state:

- Chalma, Chiconamel, Chontla, Citlaltépetl, El Higo, Ixcatepec, Ozuluama, Platón Sánchez, Pueblo Viejo, Pánuco, Tamalín, Tampico Alto, Tantima, Tantoyuca and Tempoal.

The head town (cabecera distrital), where results from individual polling stations are gathered together and tallied, is the city of Pánuco. The district reported a population of 441,087 in the 2020 census and, with Indigenous and Afrodescendent inhabitants accounting for over 40% of that total, it is classified by the INE as an indigenous district. (Note: The INE deems any local or federal electoral district where Indigenous or Afrodescendent inhabitants number 40% or more of the population to be an indigenous district.)

== Previous districting schemes ==
Evolution of electoral district numbers
	1974	1978	1996	2005	2017	2023
Veracruz	15	23	23	21	20	19
Chamber of Deputies	196	300				

Because of shifting demographics, Veracruz currently has four fewer districts than the 23 the state was allocated under the 1977 electoral reforms.

2017–2022

Between 2017 and 2022, Veracruz was assigned 20 electoral districts. The 1st district comprised 13 municipalities in the same part of the state:
- Chinampa de Gorostiza, Citlaltépetl, El Higo, Naranjos Amatlán, Ozuluama, Pánuco, Pueblo Viejo, Tamalín, Tamiahua, Tampico Alto, Tancoco, Tantima, and Tempoal.
The head town was at Pánuco.

2005–2017

Veracruz's allocation of congressional seats fell to 21 in the 2005 redistricting process. Between 2005 and 2017 the district had its head town at Pánuco and it covered 11 municipalities:
- Naranjos Amatlán, Chinampa de Gorostiza, Ozuluama, Pánuco, Pueblo Viejo, Tamalín, Tampico Alto, Tancoco, Tantima, Tempoal, and El Higo.

1996–2005

Under the 1996 districting plan, which allocated Veracruz 23 districts, the head town was at Pánuco and the district covered nine municipalities.

1978–1996

The districting scheme in force from 1978 to 1996 was the result of the 1977 electoral reforms, which increased the number of single-member seats in the Chamber of Deputies from 196 to 300. Under that plan, Veracruz's seat allocation rose from 15 to 23. The 1st district had its head town at Tantoyuca in the Huasteca Alta and it covered the municipalities of Amatlán, Tuxpan, Citlaltépetl, Chalma, Chiconamel, Chinampa, Chontla, Ixcatepec, Platón Sánchez, Tamalín, Tantima and Tantoyuca.

== Deputies returned to Congress ==
(Mexico) National parties
- Current
- PAN
- PRI
- PT
- PVEM
- MC
- Morena
- PAZ
- Somos
- Defunct or local only
- PLM
- PNR
- PRM
- PNM
- PP
- PPS
- PARM
- PFCRN
- CON
- PANAL
- PSD
- PES
- PES
- PRD

Veracruz's 1st district
Election	Deputy	Party	Term	Legislature
1916	None		1916–1917	Constituent Congress of Querétaro
...
1976	Guilebaldo Flores Fuentes	Institutional Revolutionary Party	1976–1979	50th Congress
1979	Gustavo Gámez Pérez	Institutional Revolutionary Party	1979–1982	51st Congress
1982	Antonio Murrieta Necoechea	Institutional Revolutionary Party	1982–1985	52nd Congress
1985	Guilebaldo Flores del Ángel	Institutional Revolutionary Party	1985–1988	53rd Congress
1988	Carlos Herrera Rodríguez	Institutional Revolutionary Party	1988–1991	54th Congress
1991	Gustavo Gámez Pérez	Institutional Revolutionary Party	1991–1994	55th Congress
1994	Joaquín Juárez del Ángel	Institutional Revolutionary Party	1994–1997	56th Congress
1997	Fortunato Guzmán Rivera	Institutional Revolutionary Party	1997–2000	57th Congress
2000	Guillermo Díaz Gea	Institutional Revolutionary Party	2000–2003	58th Congress
2003	Rocío Guzmán de Paz	National Action Party (Mexico)	2003–2006	59th Congress
2006	Pedro Pulido Pecero	National Action Party (Mexico)	2006–2009	60th Congress
2009	Patricio Chirinos del Ángel	Institutional Revolutionary Party	2009–2012	61st Congress
2012	Zita Pazzi Maza	Institutional Revolutionary Party	2012–2015	62nd Congress
2015	Sofia del Sagrario de León Maza	Institutional Revolutionary Party	2015–2018	63rd Congress
2018	Ricardo García Escalante	National Action Party (Mexico)	2018–2021	64th Congress
2021	Armando Antonio Gómez Betancourt	Ecologist Green Party of Mexico	2021–2024	65th Congress
2024	María del Carmen Pinete Vargas (Note: Pinete Vargas died in office on 1 April 2025. Her alternate, Guzmán González, was sworn in on 9 April.); Denisse Guzmán González	Ecologist Green Party of Mexico	2024–2025; 2025–2027	66th Congress

== Presidential elections ==
Veracruz's 1st district
Election	District won by	Party or coalition	%
2018	Andrés Manuel López Obrador	Juntos Haremos Historia	48.8847
2024	Claudia Sheinbaum Pardo	Sigamos Haciendo Historia	64.3159
