= Huastec people =

Indigenous people of Mexico

Huastec Téenek
- Huastec musicians at a Day of the Dead celebration in 2018

Total population
- Approximately 66,000 (INAH)–150,000 (Ethnologue 1990)

Regions with significant populations
- Mexico (San Luis Potosí: Veracruz: Tamaulipas)

Languages
- Wastek, Spanish

Religion
- Roman Catholicism

Related ethnic groups
- Maya peoples

Téenek
- People: Huastec
- Language: Huastec
- Country: Huasteca

The Huastec /ˈwɑːstɛk/ or Téenek (contraction of Te' Inik, "people from here"; also known as Huaxtec, Wastek or Huastecos) are an indigenous people of Mexico living in the Huasteca, which includes the administrative divisions of Hidalgo, Veracruz, San Luis Potosí and Tamaulipas concentrated along the route of the Pánuco River and along the coast of the Gulf of Mexico.

There are approximately 66,000 Huastec speakers today, of which two-thirds are in San Luis Potosí and one-third in Veracruz, although their population was probably much higher, as much as half a million, when the Spanish arrived in 1529.

The Huastec civilization was one of the Mesoamerican cultures of the Pre-Columbian era. Based on archaeological remains, they are thought to date to approximately the 10th century BCE. However, their most productive period of civilization is usually considered to be the Postclassic era, between the fall of Teotihuacan and the rise of the Aztec Empire. Pre-Columbian Huastecs constructed temples on step-pyramids, carved independently-standing sculptures, and produced elaborately painted pottery. Other Mesoamerican peoples admired them for their musical abilities.

Around 1450, Aztec armies defeated the Huastecs under the leadership of Moctezuma I; the Huastecs thereafter paid tribute to the Aztec Empire but retained substantial local self-government.

The Huastecs were conquered by the Spanish Empire between 1519 and the 1530s. After the Spanish Conquest, many Huastecs were sold as slaves in the Caribbean by the Spanish.

The first grammatical and lexical description of the Huastec language accessible to Europeans was by Andrés de Olmos, a friar who wrote the first such grammars of Nahuatl and Totonac.

== Migration history ==
=== Splitting from the rest of the Maya ===
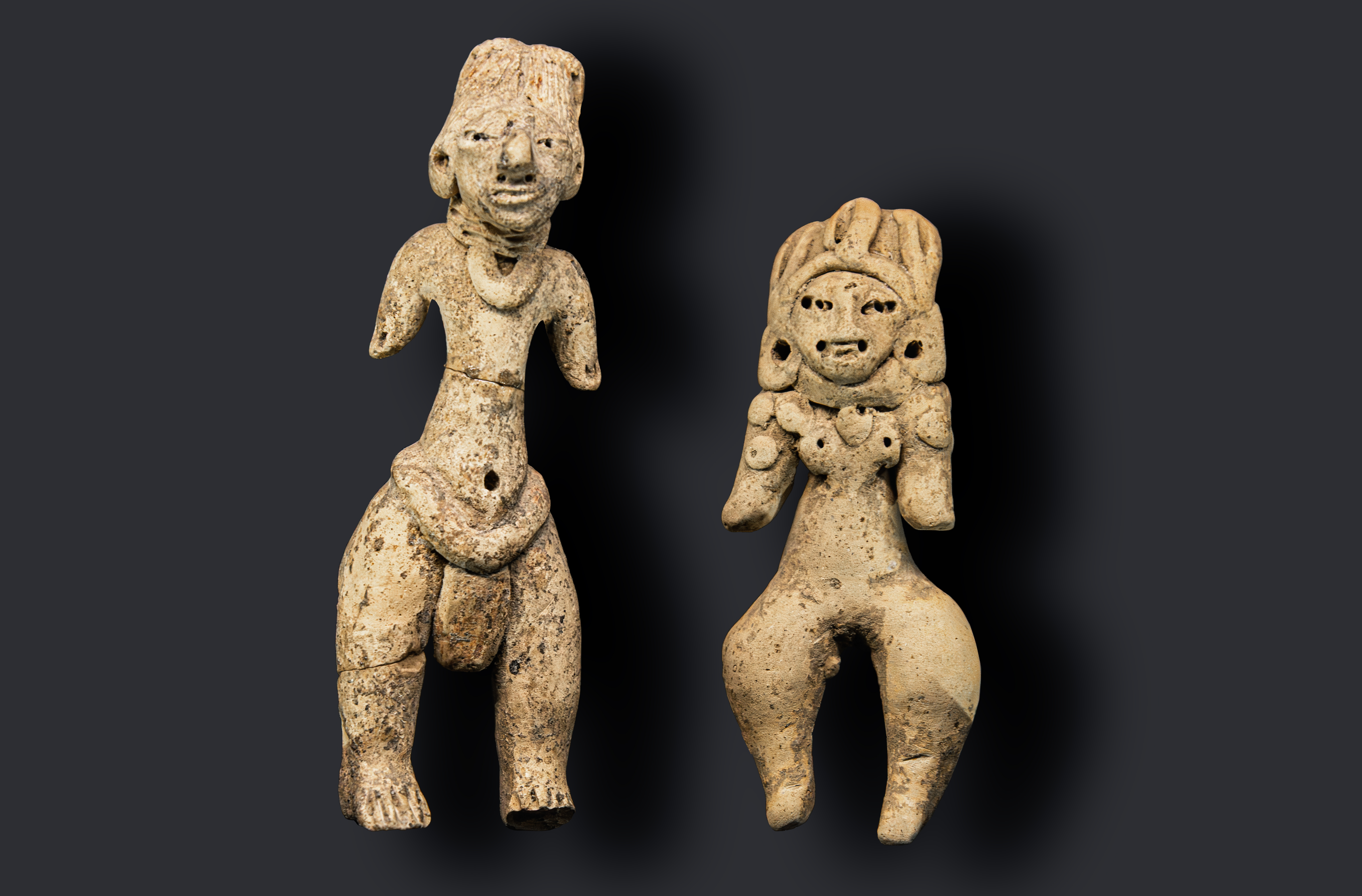
Huastec sculpture – Musée des Amériques

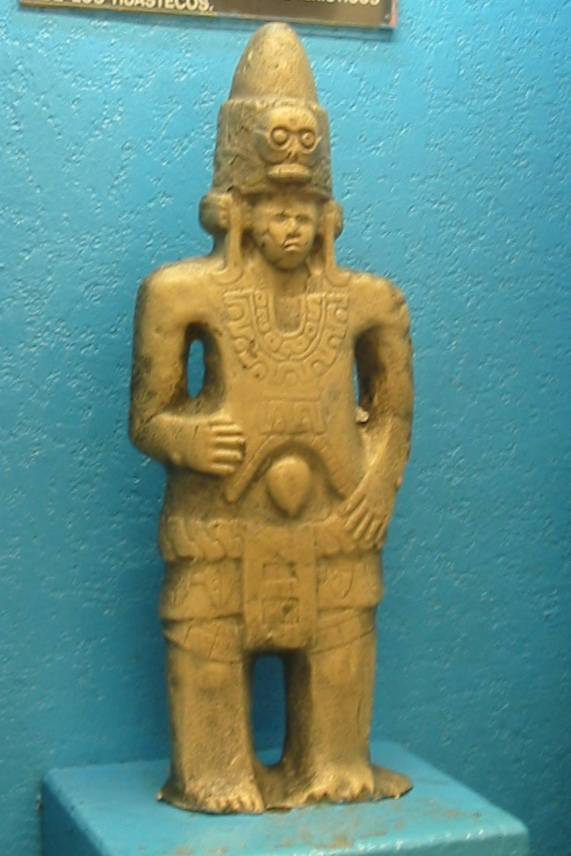
Replica of statue located in Metro Bellas Artes in Mexico City. The accompanying plaque translates to "MASCULINE FIGURE – Huasteca Culture – Early Post Classic – Description: From Naranjo, Veracruz. Possible representation of Quetzalcoatl wearing a conical cap with a skull in front and long earflaps, characteristic elements of the Huastec."

Studies of language change, especially glottochronology (that is, words changing in form or being replaced by borrowed synonyms), have given linguists the tools to estimate the point in time when many pairs of languages diverged from their common ancestral tongue. The procedure depends on the assumption that languages change, in the absence of widespread literacy, at a constant rate.

Of all the languages descended from Proto-Mayan, the proto-Huastecan language was the first to split from Mayan proper. The second split, in the non-Huastecan main branch, was between proto-Yucatecan, now spoken across the Yucatán Peninsula, and the ancestors of all other Maya languages. The only other language, besides Huastec, which arose from proto-Huastecan was Chicomuceltec (also called Cotoque), a language once spoken in Chiapas near Comitán, but now extinct.

Linguists have approximated that the precursor to the language of the Huastecs diverged from the Proto-Mayan language between 2200 and 1200 BCE. Linguist Morris Swadesh posited the later date as the latest possible time for this split to have occurred, and gave the Huastec/Chicomuceltec inik ("man") versus other-Maya winik as a typical contrast. McQuown suggests 1500 BCE, Manrique Castaneda 1800 BCE, and Dahlin 2100 BCE as the most likely dates for the split. Kaufman's proposed date of about 2200 BCE would require two regular phonological (sound) changes that are attested in all Maya languages, "r" changing to "y" and "q" to "k", to have happened independently after the split, in both the Huastec/Chicomuceltec branch and in the branch of all other Mayan languages.

Robertson's work on verb affixes in the Mayan languages implies that the Huastecs were in contact with the proto-Tzeltal branch of Mayan. In Proto-Mayan, absolutives could be marked either by a prefix or a suffix, depending on the presence of a tense/aspect marker. This feature was retained in Q'anjob'al (a Maya language, spoken in the Cuchumatanes mountains of Guatemala), but lost in other branches. (Yucatecan always uses a suffix for absolutives, while Kʼicheʼ always uses a prefix.) Huastec appears to have been influenced by proto-Tzeltal, resulting in such innovations as the preposition ta, used with the object of a verb in the third person. If, as seems likely, the Huastec-Maya split occurred around 2000 BCE, the Huastecs probably did not travel far from the Guatemala-Chiapas borderlands until after 1100 BCE, more or less, by which time the proto-Tzeltalans had been established as a separate branch.

=== Art ===
The Huastec people historically lived north of the Totonacs in the northeastern corner of Mesoamerica, which helped their influence with distinct style of art. Their art was influenced by the coastal area resulting in shell artifacts.

Amongst their art they also made pots, gaming stones, platform pipes, and sculptures. These items were often made from shells and made into shape of human heads, engraved shell gorgets, fan headdresses, and of hunchbacked humans.

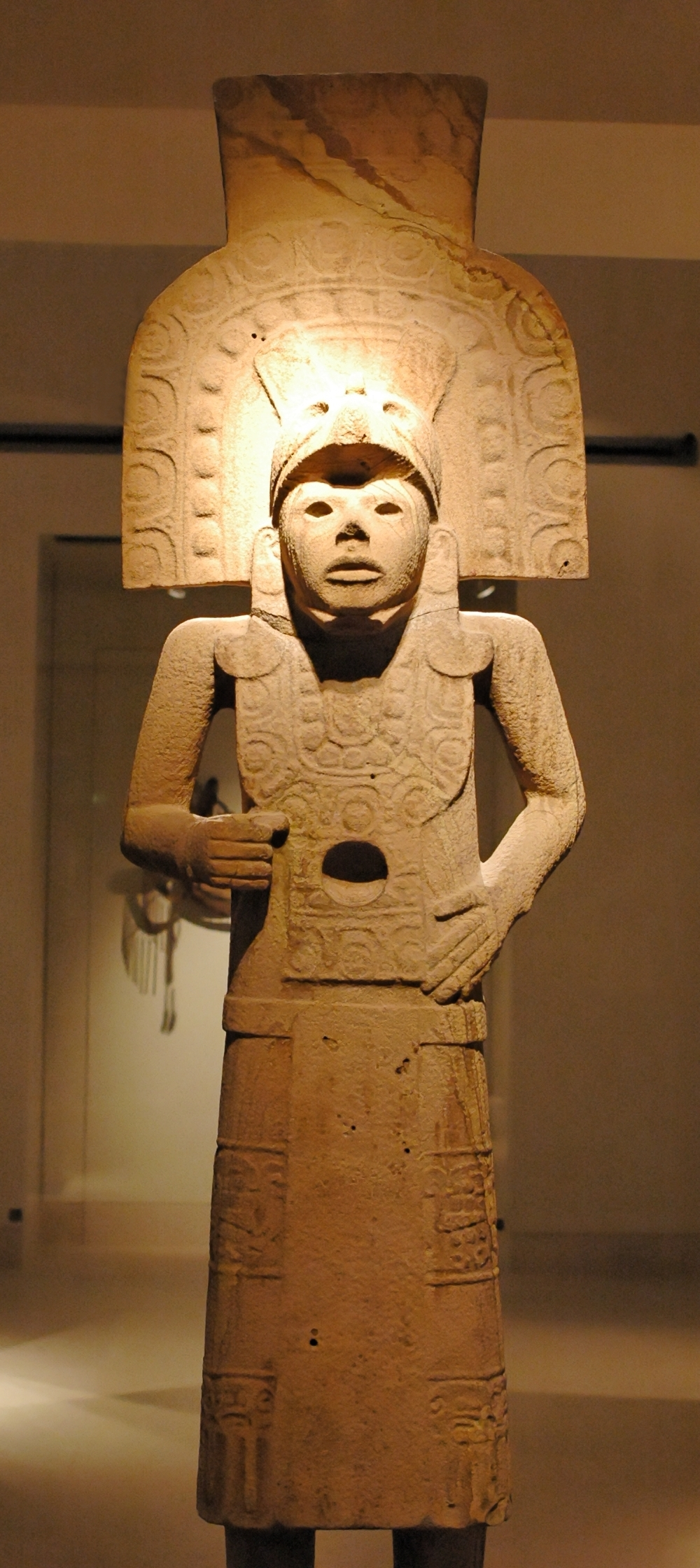
Huastec statue from the Tampico Region, 14th–16th centuries

=== Arrival in the Huasteca region ===
The Huasteca region of Mexico extends from the easternmost limestone ranges of the Sierra Madre Oriental, across the coastal plain and the Otontepec hills to the Gulf of Mexico, in northern Veracruz state, eastern San Luis Potosí state, and (by some definitions) southern Tamaulipas. At least three Indigenous languages are spoken in parts of the region today: Nahuatl (a Uto-Aztecan language), spoken especially in Veracruz, but also in San Luis Potosí; Pame (an Oto-Manguean language). spoken in the hilly borderlands of San Luis Potosí and Querétaro; and Huastec (Wastek) (a Maya language), spoken in San Luis Potosí and northernmost Veracruz, and formerly in Tamaulipas. Some would include the Totonac-speaking area, in north-central Veracruz, as part of the Huasteca. The Huastec region was known to the Aztecs (ancestors of today's Nahuatl speakers, who arrived in the Huasteca around 1450) for its fertile abundance, and includes the northernmost patches of tropical moist forest and cloud forest in the Americas.

The Huastecs arrived in the Huasteca between 1500 BCE and 900 BCE. The linguistic evidence is corroborated by archaeological discoveries. In 1954, Richard Stockton MacNeish found ceramics and figurines in the Middle Formative period, called "Pavon de Panuco" in the Panuco River sites of the Huasteca, which resemble Preclassic objects from Uaxactun, a Petén-region Maya site. A date of no earlier than 1100 BCE for the Huastecs’ arrival at their present location seems most likely, since they probably had not arrived at the north-central Veracruz site of Santa Luisa until about 1200 BCE, the phase at the end of the Early Formative period known locally as the "Ojite phase." Artifacts of the period include Panuco-like basalt manos and metates. (The Huastecs remained in Santa Luisa, located east of Papantla near the Gulf coast, until supplanted or absorbed by the Totonacs around AD 1000).

One nexus of carved iconographic traditions, the "yoke-palm-axe" complex, was found from Jaina Island in coastal Campeche to the Huasteca (and in between, in Aparicio, Veracruz), in association with the pelota ballgame, decapitation, and tooth mutilation; however, this may reflect coastal trade contacts after the Huastecs were established in the Huasteca.

=== Huastec–Maya separation ===
Proto-Maya, the common ancestor of all Maya languages, was probably spoken in west-central Guatemala, around the highland pine-oak forests of the Cuchumatanes mountain chain: north of the Motagua and Grijalva river valleys, through patches of cloud forest, and down to the edge of the tropical forest lowlands near the Ixcán and Chixoy (Negro) rivers, which flow into the Usumacinta River. Evidence that this region was the Maya "heartland" include its being located near the center of present-day language diversity of the Maya language family (and therefore requiring the minimum number of moves to place the languages in their current locations), the fact that proto-Maya included words for flora and fauna from both highland and lowland areas, and the debatable idea that it is easier for a group of people to spread from a highland region to a lowland one than vice versa. Not all archaeological evidence agrees with this conclusion: there are older, unbroken ceramic traditions from Loltun Cave in Yucatán, as well as Cuello in Belize, which suggest alternative Maya homelands.

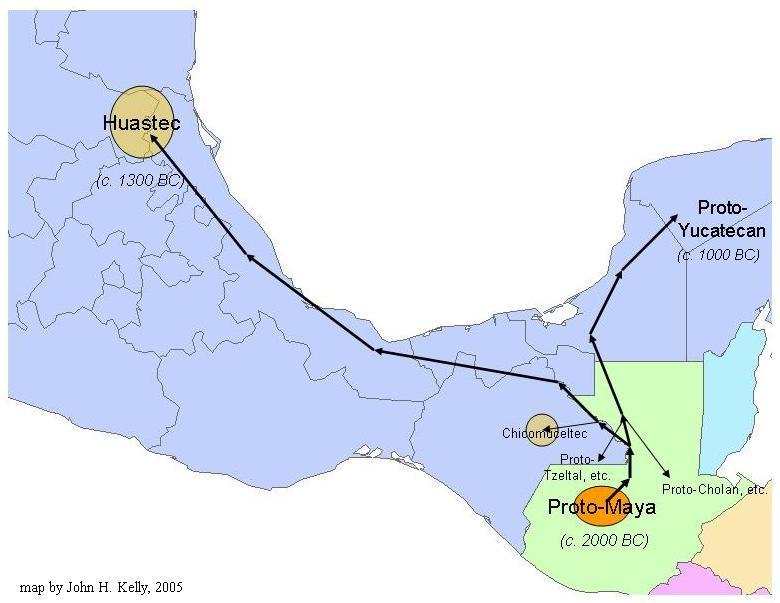
Approximate routes and dates of the proto-Huastec and other Maya-speaking groups

Whether the proto-Huastecs split from the rest of the Maya in 2200 or in 1200 BCE, the separation occurred at least a millennium before the rise of classic Maya culture. It is no surprise, therefore, that the word "to write" is different in proto-Huastec (θuc-) and in the other Maya language branch (c’ib).

2000 BCE is a reasonable date for the Huastec/Maya split, and the slopes of the Cuchumatanes range as a reasonable location for the speakers of proto-Maya, it seems likely that the split occurred after these proto-Maya speakers (or a portion of them) began to migrate north, probably along the Usumacinta River, and before the two groups resulting from the split began to move in opposite directions: the proto-Huastec speakers moving northwest (and, soon thereafter, the proto-Chicomuceltec west into the Chiapas highlands), and the proto-Yucatec/other Maya-speakers spreading northeast (one branch of which became Chontal, presumed by many from its widespread loan words and hieroglyphic evidence to be the dominant language of the classic Peten Maya heartland) (see Fig. 1). While we have no direct archaeological evidence to explain the split itself, we can assume by linguistic evidence that contact was soon cut off between the two groups, despite there being no geographical feature that would automatically isolate them from each other.

The intervening feature, then, was likely a powerful linguistic-cultural group. What group occupied the Usumacinta River-Gulf Coast lowlands (mainly in today's Mexican state of Tabasco) between 2000 BCE (when the proto-Huastecs began their journey) and 1000 BCE (by which time the proto-Yucatecs had arrived in Yucatán, the Chicomuceltecs had been isolated from the Huastecs, and the Huastecs were arriving in central Veracruz)? Most scholars propose that this region was inhabited by speakers of the Mixe–Zoque family. While speakers of Mixe–Zoquean languages are today confined to the mountains of northeast Oaxaca, along the backbone of the Isthmus of Tehuantepec, and into extreme western Chiapas, it is likely that they once occupied the entire Gulf Coast lowland from the isthmus to the Tuxtla mountains – in other words, the Olmec heartland, soon dominated by the presumably Mixe–Zoque-speaking Olmec civilization of about 1400 to 500 BCE. One line of evidence that the Olmecs spoke Mixe–Zoque are the words that the proto-Huastecs borrowed from proto-Mixe–Zoque as they passed through the southern Gulf lowlands; for example, ciw, meaning "squash."

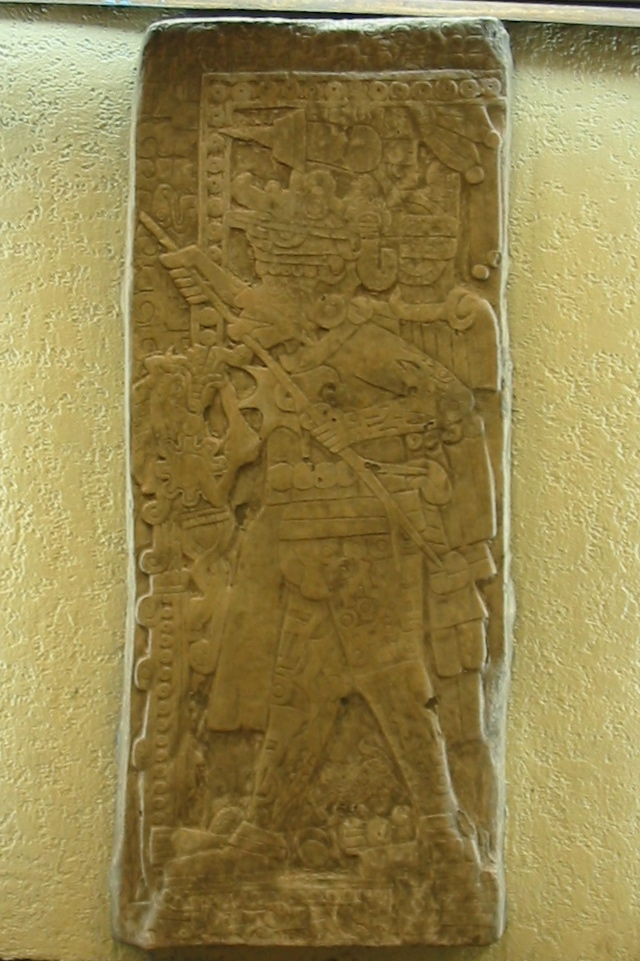
Replica of bas relief image in Metro Bellas Artes in Mexico City. The accompanying plaque reads "STELA DE HUILOCINTLA – Huasteca culture – Late Classic Period – Description: Replica from Huilocintla, Veracruz. An animal licking up the blood of the mouth of a priest who sacrificed himself."

Thus, there is some reason to ascribe the linguistic isolation of early Huastecs from other Maya speakers to proto-Olmecs speaking a Mixe–Zoque language, themselves recently arrived after migrating northward from the Soconusco region of the Pacific coast and across the isthmus of Tehuantepec. There is much stronger evidence that the push for the Huastecs’ further migration up the Gulf coast was caused by the active presence of the early Olmecs (c. 1400 to 1100 BCE) of San Lorenzo and associated sites. If this is true, most of the distance that the Huastecs migrated during their entire history, from Guatemala to the Huasteca, was traveled in only a century or two at most: the portion between the Olmec heartland around San Lorenzo, and the environs of San Luisa.

The Huastecs and the Yucatán Maya were reunited, in a way, during the late nineteenth century, when Huastec chicle-tappers and lumbermen were transported to the state of Campeche to work the similar forests there, mainly employed by U.S.-based companies. A cross-Gulf steamship trade developed at the same time, with products such as salt exported from Campeche to Tuxpan (a Huastec-region port), and items such as sugar from Tuxpan to Campeche.

== See also ==
- Huastec State
