= Cabil language =

Extinct Mayan language of Chiapas, Mexico

Cabil
- Native to: Mexico
- Region: Chiapas
- Extinct: (date missing)
- Language family: Mayan: ? Huastecan; Cabil

Language codes
- ISO 639-3: None (mis)
- Glottolog: None

The Cabil language (also spelled Cavil or Cauil) is an extinct Mayan language, spoken in the towns of Chicomuselo, Comalapa, Yayagüita and Huitatán, in the Mexican state of Chiapas.

The only colonial text in Cabil is Domingo Paz's manuscript Confesionario y Doctrina christiana en lengua chanabal de Comitán y Tachinulla en las Chiapas. Besides Cabil, this document includes texts written in Mochoʼ and in Tojolabʼal (called Chanabal by Paz), mainly spoken in Comitán. The Cabil text is found on pages 9v through 11.

The Confesionario is part of a collection assembled by Abbot Brasseur de Bourbourg, originating in Mexico and Guatemala, registered in his Bibliothéque México-Guatemalienne prècédée d'un coup d'ail les ètudes americaines... (1871). They later came into the possession of Auguste Pinart who included them in his Catalogue des livres rares et précieux, principalment sur l´Amerique et sur les langues du monde (1883) and eventually in various libraries.

Lyle Campbell, based on the matching distribution, considered Cabil to simply be an old name for the Chicomuceltec language, and speculated that the name originated from an old Tzeltal name for the town of Chicomuselo (cahbha 'river').
