= Chicomuceltec language =

Dormant Mayan language of southeastern Mexico

Chicomuceltec
- Chikomuselteko
- Pronunciation: [tʃikomuselˈteko]
- Native to: Mexico (Chiapas state); Guatemala (Huehuetenango Dept.)
- Region: several communities in the Fronteriza and Sierra demographic regions of the southeastern Chiapas highlands; isolated villages across the Guatemalan border
- Ethnicity: Chicomucelteco
- Extinct: by 1978
- Language family: Mayan: Huastecan; Chicomuceltec

Language codes
- ISO 639-3: cob
- Glottolog: chic1271
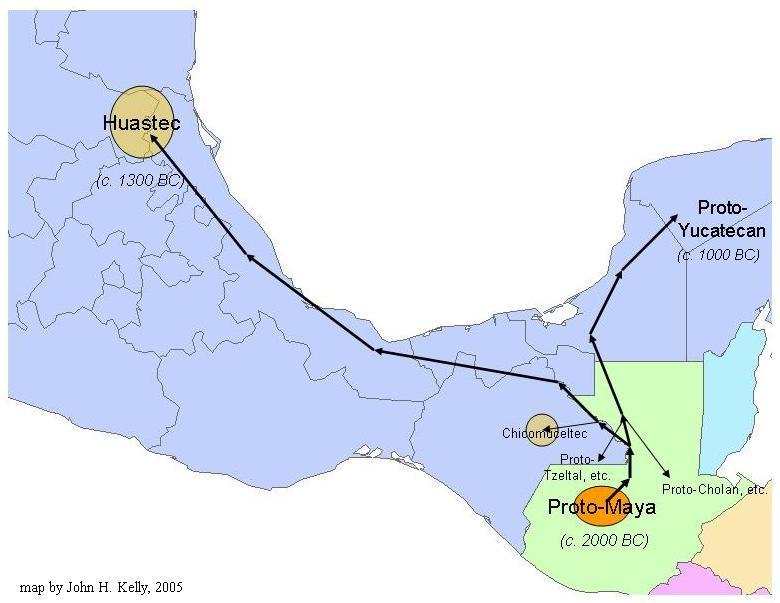
- Map showing one migratory proposal for the early split of Wastek and Chicomuceltec from the Proto-Mayan "homeland".

Chicomuceltec (also Chikomuselteko or Chicomucelteco; archaically, Cotoque) is a dormant Mayan language formerly spoken in the region defined by the municipios of Chicomuselo, Mazapa de Madero, and Amatenango de la Frontera in Chiapas, Mexico, as well as some nearby areas of Guatemala. By the 1970s–80s it had become dormant, with recent reports in Mayanist literature finding that there are no living native speakers. Communities of contemporary Chicomucelteco descendants, numbering approximately 1500 people in Mexico and 100 in Guatemala are Spanish speakers.

Chicomuceltec was formerly sometimes called Cakchiquel Mam, although it is only distantly related to either Cakchiquel or Mam, being much closer to Wastek (Huastec).

== Geographical distribution ==
The geographical distribution of Wastek and Chicomuceltec in relation to the rest of the Mayan languages —with Wastek centered on the northern Gulf Coast region away from the others lying south and east of the Isthmus of Tehuantepec— led Kroeber to also propose that Chicomuceltec was either a remnant population left behind after the Huastec people's migration north from the Chiapas highlands region, or alternatively represented a return of a Huastec subgroup to their earlier homelands.

== History ==
Chicomuceltec had some loanwords from neighboring Tzeltalan and Qʼanjobalan languages.

The Chicomuceltec language was first documented in modern linguistic literature as a distinct language in the late 19th century, where it appeared in an account published by linguist Karl Sapper of his travels in northern Mesoamerica 1888–95.

Chicomuceltec's relationship with Wastek was established in the late 1930s (Kroeber 1939), which concluded via word-list comparisons with other Mayan languages that it bore a higher degree of affinity with Wastek than other Mayan language branches.

=== Historical documentation ===
A two-page document dated to 1775 which was retrieved from the Bibliothèque nationale de France in Paris is the oldest-known testament of the Chicomuceltec language. Taking the form of a Roman Catholic confession, the manuscript contains eight sentences written in Chicomuceltec. It also mentions that the language was then referred to as "Cotoque".

=== Cabil ===
The Cabil language, now extinct, may have been closely related to or identical with Chicomuceltec. Lyle Campbell considers Cabil to simply be an old name for the Chicomuceltec language, and speculated that the name originated from an old Tzeltal name for the town of Chicomuselo (cahbha, meaning 'river').

== Decline and extinction ==
By the early 20th century it was clear the language was in decline, and when in 1926 Franz Termer visited the community of Chicomucelo, he reported finding only three individuals (all over 60 years of age) who could speak Chicomuceltec, out of a township of approximately 2,500. The Chicomuceltec speakers themselves conducted their day-to-day conversations in Spanish.
