= CKZ =

CKZ or ckz may refer to:

- CKZ, the FAA LID code for Pennridge Airport, Pennsylvania, United States
- CKZ, the IATA code for Çanakkale Airport, Turkey
- CKZ, the station code for Chak Nizam railway station, Pakistan
- ckz, the ISO 639-3 code for Cauque Mayan language, Guatemala
