= Huastec language =

Mayan language of central Mexico

Wastek
- Huasteco
- Teenek
- Native to: Mexico
- Region: San Luis Potosí, Veracruz and Tamaulipas
- Ethnicity: Huastec
- Native speakers: 170,000 (2020 census)
- Language family: Mayan: Huastecan; Wastek

Language codes
- ISO 639-3: hus
- Glottolog: huas1242
- ELP: Huastec
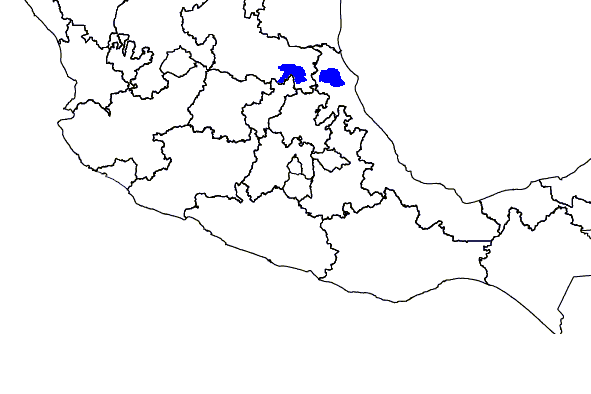
- Approximate extent of Huastec-speaking area in Mexico

Téenek
- People: Huastec
- Language: Huastec
- Country: Huasteca

A speaker of Huastec, also known as Tenek

The Huastec (also spelled Wasteko or Huasteco) language, now commonly known by the endonym Téenek, of Mexico is spoken by the Téenek people living in rural areas of San Luis Potosí and northern Veracruz. Though relatively isolated from them, it is related to the Mayan languages spoken further south and east in Mexico and Central America. Huastec is remarkable among Mayan languages for having tone, much like its Otomanguean and Totonac neighbors.

According to the 2005 population census, there are about 200,000 speakers of Huasteco in Mexico (some 120,000 in San Luis Potosí and some 80,000 in Veracruz). The language and its speakers are also called Teenek, and this name has gained currency in Mexican national and international usage in recent years.

The now-extinct Chicomuceltec language, spoken in Chiapas and Guatemala, was most closely related to Wasteko.

The first linguistic description of the Huastec language in a European language was written by Andrés de Olmos, who also wrote the first grammatical descriptions of Nahuatl and Totonac.

Huastec-language broadcasting is carried out by the CDI's radio station XEANT-AM, based in Tancanhuitz de Santos, San Luis Potosí.

== Dialects ==
Huastec has three dialects, which have a time depth of no more than 400 years (Norcliffe 2003:3). It is spoken in a region of east-central Mexico known as the Huasteca Potosina.

1. Western (Potosino) — 48,000 speakers in the 9 San Luis Potosí towns of Ciudad Valles (Tantocou), Aquismón, Huehuetlán, Tancanhuitz, Tanlajás, San Antonio, Tampamolón, Tanquian, and Tancuayalab.
2. Central (Veracruz) — 22,000 speakers in the 2 northern Veracruz towns of Tempoal and Tantoyuca.
3. Eastern (Otontepec) — 12,000 speakers in the 7 northern Veracruz towns of Chontla, Tantima, Tancoco, Chinampa, Naranjos, Amatlán, and Tamiahua. Also known as Southeastern Huastec. Ana Kondic (2012) reports only about 1,700 speakers, in the municipalities of Chontla (San Francisco, Las Cruces, Arranca Estacas, and Ensinal villages), Chinampa, Amatlan, and Tamiahua.

== Phonology ==
=== Vowels ===
Short vowels
	Front	Central	Back
Close	i, ɪ ⟨i⟩		ʊ ⟨u⟩
Mid	e, ɛ ⟨e⟩		ɔ, ʌ ⟨o⟩
Open		ə, a ⟨a⟩	

Long vowels
	Front	Central	Back
Close	iː ⟨ii⟩		ʊː, uː ⟨uu⟩
Mid	ɛː, eː ⟨ee⟩		ɔː, oː ⟨oo⟩
Open		aː ⟨aa⟩	

- /aː/ can be realized as laryngealized [a̰ː] after a glottalized consonant.
- /ʊ/ in unstressed syllables can also be heard as [ʌ].

=== Consonants ===
		Labial	Dental	Alveolar	Palatal	Velar		Glottal
		Labial	Dental	Alveolar	Palatal	plain	labial	Glottal
Nasal		m ⟨m⟩	n ⟨n⟩					
Plosive/ Affricate	aspirated	pʰ ⟨p⟩	tʰ ⟨t⟩	tsʰ ⟨ts⟩	tʃʰ ⟨ch⟩	kʰ ⟨k⟩	kʷʰ ⟨kw⟩	
Plosive/ Affricate	ejective		tʼ ⟨tʼ⟩	tsʼ ⟨tsʼ⟩	tʃʼ ⟨chʼ⟩	kʼ ⟨kʼ⟩	kʼʷ ⟨kwʼ⟩	
Plosive/ Affricate	voiced	b ⟨b⟩	(d ⟨d⟩)			(ɡ ⟨kʼ⟩)	(ɡʷ ⟨kwʼ⟩)	
Fricative		(f ⟨f⟩)	θ ⟨z⟩	s ⟨s⟩	ʃ ⟨x⟩			h ⟨j⟩
Approximant		w ⟨w⟩	l ⟨l⟩		j ⟨y⟩			
Flap			ɾ ⟨r⟩					

- Unaspirated plosives and affricates only occur as allophones of their aspirated counterparts word-medially. /p/ can also become voiced to [b] word-finally.
- /f, d/ may be present Spanish loanwords.
- The affricates /ts, tsʼ/ can also be realized as [s, dz].
- /b/ can also be realized as a fricative [β], and also as a voiceless fricative [ɸ] in word-final positions.
- Ejective velars /kʼ, kʼʷ/ can be realized as voiced [ɡ, ɡʷ] word-medially.
- Approximanta /l, w, j/ can be devoiced [l̥, w̥, j̊] word-finally.
- /n/ before velars is realized as a palatal nasal [ɲ].
- /h/ before /i/ can be realized as a velar fricative [x].
