= Huastec State =

Regional separation movement in Mexico

The so-called Huastec State (Spanish: Estado Huasteco) is a regional separation movement comprising the regions of current Mexican states of San Luis Potosí, Veracruz and Tamaulipas (the integrity of the Huasteca region) to become number 32 in the states of the federation and the Federal District. During the twenty-first century the movement has taken hold in a peaceful way through the Chamber of Deputies.

The dream of creating the Huasteco State has been regarded as a utopia for the governors of three states adjacent, who are the main opponents to the project of creation of the federal entity number 32 of the United Mexican States. For the next autumn, the civilians seeking the means to integrate as a new entity, indigenous communities, farmers and citizens directly and indirectly apriban building project.

The main arguments are, the abandonment of the region by their state governments, cultural and racial integration which was divided by the region in the colonial and republican period. The reintegration of the Huasteca is considered a historic debt that it has with the indigenous peoples of the region.
