= Huastecan languages =

Most divergent branch of the Mayan language family

Huastecan
- Geographic distribution: Veracruz, San Luis Potosí
- Linguistic classification: Mayan: Huastecan
- Proto-language: Proto–Huastecan
- Subdivisions: Huastec; Chikomuseltek †; ?Epi-Olmec †

Language codes
- ISO 639-3: –
- Glottolog: huas1241
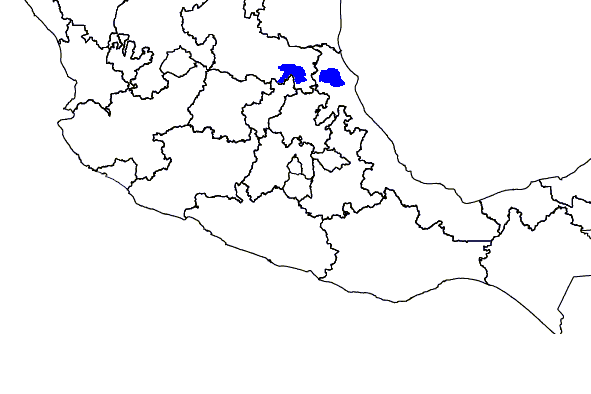
- Approximate extent of Huastec-speaking area in Mexico

The Huastecan languages of Mexico are the most divergent branch of the Mayan language family. They are Wastek (Huastec) and Chikomuseltek (Chicomuceltec).

Wastek (also spelled Huastec and Huaxtec) is spoken in the Mexican states of Veracruz and San Luis Potosí by around 110,000 people. It is the most divergent of modern Mayan languages. Chicomuceltec was a language related to Wastek and spoken in Chiapas that became extinct some time before 1982.

== Sources ==
- Campbell, Lyle; Canger, Una (1978). "Chicomuceltec's last throes". International Journal of American Linguistics. 44 (3): 228–230. doi:10.1086/465548. ISSN 0020-7071. S2CID 144743316.
