= Cauque Mayan language =

Mixed Mayan language spoken in Guatemala

Cauque Mayan
- Cakchiquel–Quiché Mixed Language; Kaqchikel–Kʼicheʼ Mixed Language
- Native to: Guatemala
- Region: Sacatepéquez
- Native speakers: (2,000 cited 1998)
- Language family: Mayan: Mixed Kaqchikel–Kʼicheʼ; Cauque Mayan

Language codes
- ISO 639-3: ckz
- Glottolog: cakc1235

Cauqué Mayan (also known as Kaqchikel–Kʼicheʼ Mixed language) is a mixed language spoken in the village of Santa María Cauqué, Santiago Sacatepéquez, in the Sacatepéquez Department in Guatemala. It is a Kʼicheʼ (Quiché) base relexified by Kaqchikel (Cakchiquel). During the colonial era, Kʼicheʼ migrated to Sacatepéquez, in the heart of Kaqchikel territory, where they founded the village of Santa María Cauque. Today only older adults retain the Kʼicheʼ base to their speech: for younger speakers, the language has merged into Kaqchikel.

== Origins ==
While the language's grammatical base is from Kʼicheʼ, its lexicon is supplied by Kaqchikel. It is generally thought that in the 15th century during the colonial period, its original Kʼicheʼ speakers came from the area of what is now the Department of Quiché and founded Santa María Cauqué. Currently, the aldea is west of Guatemala City and at least 100 miles from the nearest Kʼicheʼ-speaking region. The exact origin of this mixed language's Kʼicheʼan grammatical base is not agreed upon, with some sources listing the Kʼicheʼ dialect of Joyabaj as having been the contributing grammar, while others state that the area of current-day city of Quetzaltenango is from where the original Santa María Cauqué founders and their respective Kʼicheʼ dialect came. In any case, it is clear that a variety of the original Kʼicheʼ language was brought into and has continued to manifest in the grammar of this Kaqchikel–Kʼicheʼ Mixed Language, while it demonstrates the result of relexification over time from the surrounding Kaqchikel language. This particular process of relexification of the original Kʼicheʼ that had emigrated to a predominantly Kaqchikel-speaking region probably began with borrowing from the contact language (Kaqchikel) of roots and content morphemes, such as nouns and verbs. This heavy lexical influence is understood to have been a significant deviation in "content" words from those that were part of the original Joyabaj dialect of Kʼicheʼ to their current Kaqchikel counterparts in the Kaqchikel–Kʼicheʼ Mixed Language, while at the same time there has been no structural borrowing from the surrounding Kaqchikel to replace the grammar that appears to have originated from Kʼicheʼ.

== Features ==
According to a preliminary phonological analysis by Paul S. Stevenson, the speech of those from Santa María Cauqué came from an original variety of Kʼicheʼ, which now acts as the mixed language's grammatical base. This evidence is realized in Kʼicheʼ morphological-syntactic elements surrounding Kaqchikel vocabulary. This includes verb inflection for present tense-aspect marker, from which the Kʼicheʼ prefix //k-// is implemented, contrasted with the more typical Kaqchikel prefixes of //y-// and //n-//. Furthermore, Santa María Cauqué utilizes Kʼicheʼ suffixes at the end of a phrase that indicate whether the verb was transitive or intransitive, //-o//~//-u// or //-ik// respectively, those which Kaqchikel does not. In fact, the //-ik// suffix can also be found with positionals in Santa María Cauqué. Possession by a third person singular, preconsonantal, displays Kʼicheʼ //u-// and not Kaqchikel //ru-//. The third person pronoun is also affected, in that the mixed language shows a higher number of speakers displaying Kʼicheʼ rareʼ 'him/her/it', instead of Kaqchikel rijaʼ 'him/her/it'. Function words are still marked by Kʼicheʼ as well, with //-ukʼ// 'with' and not Kaqchikel //-ikʼin//. While the majority of grammatical elements in Santa María Cauqué are presented in Kʼicheʼ, the majority of lexical elements are realized in Kaqchikel.

== Status ==
Following Bakker and Muysken's criteria of mixed languages, the Cauqué Mixed Language, with its convergence of Kʼicheʼ grammar and Kaqchikel lexicon, is a result of geographical and historical social influence of identity (López 1999). As documented in 1998 and 2003, there are about 2,000 speakers of the Kaqchikel–Kʼicheʼ Mixed Language in the Santa María Cauqué aldea. They are mainly adults older than 30 years of age, while there does not seem to be as much language transmission to the younger generations. These speakers also display bilingualism in the surrounding South Central Kaqchikel dialect, while the numbers of those also bilingual in Spanish continues to grow. While there are previous assertions that the mixed language has not undergone structural borrowing, there still appears to be a shift within the language to become more like South Central Kaqchikel, since older speakers show more of a Kʼicheʼ morphological-syntactic base.

== Sources ==
- Paul Stevenson, 1990. Santa Maria Cauque: a case of Cakchiquel–Quiche language mixing.
