= Mayan languages =

Language family spoken in Mesoamerica

Mayan
- Geographic distribution: Mesoamerica: Southern Mexico, Guatemala, Belize, north-western El Salvador and western Honduras; refugee and emigrants, mainly in the United States and Canada.
- Ethnicity: Maya peoples
- Native speakers: 6.0 million
- Linguistic classification: One of the world's primary language families
- Proto-language: Proto-Mayan
- Subdivisions: Huastecan; Core Mayan • Yucatecan • Eastern–Western

Language codes
- ISO 639-2 / 5: myn
- Glottolog: maya1287
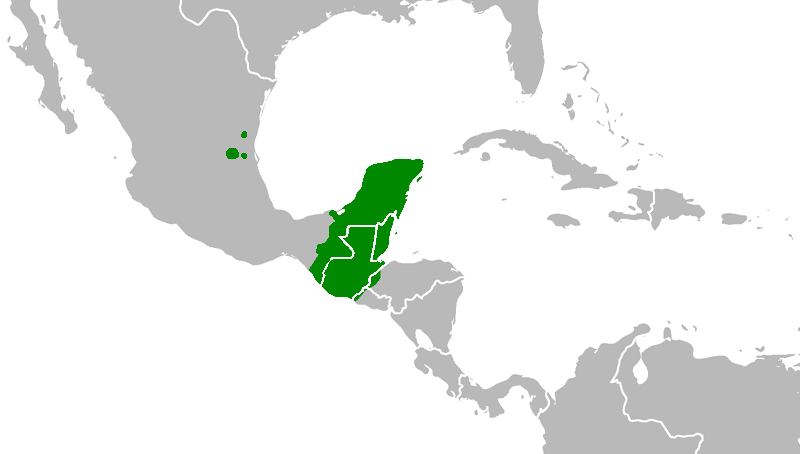
- Location of Mayan speaking populations. See below for a detailed map of the different languages.

The Mayan languages (Note: In linguistics, it is conventional to use Mayan when referring to the languages, or an aspect of a language. In other academic fields, Maya is the preferred usage, serving as both a singular and plural noun, and as the adjectival form.) are a language family spoken in Mesoamerica, both in the south of Mexico and northern Central America. Mayan languages are spoken by at least six million Maya people, primarily in Guatemala, Mexico, Belize, El Salvador and Honduras. In 1996, Guatemala formally recognized 21 Mayan languages by name, (Note: Achiʼ is counted as a variant of Kʼicheʼ by the Guatemalan government.) and Mexico recognizes eight within its territory.

The Mayan language family is one of the best-documented and most studied in the Americas. Contemporary Mayan languages descend from the Proto-Mayan language, which has been partially reconstructed using the comparative method. The proto-Mayan language diversified into at least six different branches: the Huastecan, Quichean, Yucatecan, Qanjobalan, Mamean and Chʼolan–Tzeltalan branches.

The Mayan languages form part of the Mesoamerican language area, an area of linguistic convergence developed throughout millennia of interaction between the peoples of Mesoamerica. All Mayan languages display the basic diagnostic traits of this linguistic area. For example, all use relational nouns instead of adpositions to indicate spatial relationships. They also possess grammatical and typological features that set them apart from other languages of Mesoamerica, such as the use of ergativity in the grammatical treatment of verbs and their subjects and objects, specific inflectional categories on verbs, and a special word class of "positionals" which is typical of all Mayan languages.

During the pre-Columbian era of Mesoamerican history, some Mayan languages were written in Maya script. Its use was particularly widespread during the Classic period of Maya civilization (c. 250–900). The surviving corpus of over 5,000 known individual Maya inscriptions on buildings, monuments, pottery and bark-paper codices, combined with the rich post-Conquest literature in Mayan languages written in the Latin script, provides a basis for the modern understanding of pre-Columbian history unparalleled in the Americas.

== History ==
=== Proto-Mayan ===
Approximate migration routes and dates for various Mayan language families. The region shown as Proto-Mayan is now occupied by speakers of the Qʼanjobalan branch (light blue in other figures). (Note: Based on Kaufman (1976).)

Mayan languages are the descendants of a proto-language called Proto-Mayan or, in Kʼicheʼ Maya, Nabʼee Mayaʼ Tzij 'the old Maya Language'. The Proto-Mayan language is believed to have been spoken in the Cuchumatanes highlands of central Guatemala in an area corresponding roughly to where Qʼanjobalan is spoken today. The earliest proposal which identified the Chiapas-Guatemalan highlands as the likely "cradle" of Mayan languages was published by the German antiquarian and scholar Karl Sapper in 1912. (Note: see attribution in Fernández de Miranda (1968, p. 75)) Terrence Kaufman and John Justeson have reconstructed more than 3000 lexical items for the proto-Mayan language.

According to the prevailing classification scheme by Lyle Campbell and Terrence Kaufman, the first division occurred around 2200 BC, when Huastecan split away from Mayan proper after its speakers moved northwest along the Gulf Coast of Mexico. Proto-Yucatecan and Proto-Chʼolan speakers subsequently split off from the main group and moved north into the Yucatán Peninsula. Speakers of the western branch moved south into the areas now inhabited by Mamean and Quichean people. When speakers of proto-Tzeltalan later separated from the Chʼolan group and moved south into the Chiapas Highlands, they came into contact with speakers of Mixe–Zoque languages. According to an alternative theory by Robertson and Houston, Huastecan stayed in the Guatemalan highlands with speakers of Chʼolan–Tzeltalan, separating from that branch at a much later date than proposed by Kaufman.

In the Archaic period (before 2000 BC), a number of loanwords from Mixe–Zoquean languages seem to have entered the proto-Mayan language. This has led to hypotheses that the early Maya were dominated by speakers of Mixe–Zoquean languages, possibly the Olmec. (Note: This theory was first proposed by Campbell & Kaufman (1976)) In the case of the Xincan and Lencan languages, on the other hand, Mayan languages are more often the source than the receiver of loanwords. Mayan language specialists such as Campbell believe this suggests a period of intense contact between Maya and the Lencan and Xinca people, possibly during the Classic period (250–900).

=== Classic period ===
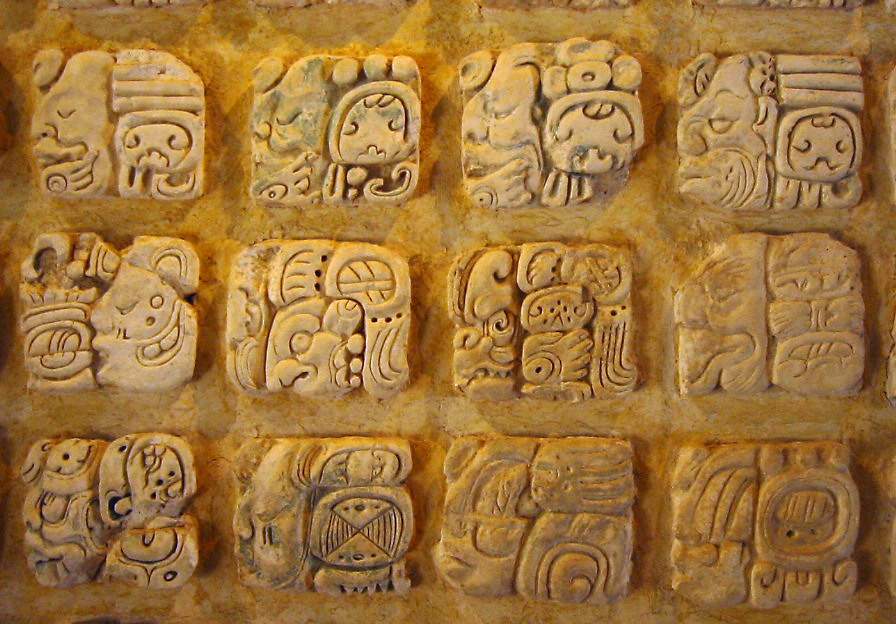
Classic period Maya glyphs in stucco at the Museo de sitio in Palenque, Mexico

During the Classic period the major branches began diversifying into separate languages. The split between Proto-Yucatecan (in the north, that is, the Yucatán Peninsula) and Proto-Chʼolan (in the south, that is, the Chiapas highlands and Petén Basin) had already occurred by the Classic period, when most extant Maya inscriptions were written. Both variants are attested in hieroglyphic inscriptions at the Maya sites of the time, and both are commonly referred to as "Classic Maya language". Although a single prestige language was by far the most frequently recorded on extant hieroglyphic texts, evidence for at least three different varieties of Mayan have been discovered within the hieroglyphic corpus—an Eastern Chʼolan variety found in texts written in the southern Maya area and the highlands, a Western Chʼolan variety diffused from the Usumacinta region from the mid-7th century on, and a Yucatecan variety found in the texts from the Yucatán Peninsula. The reason why only few linguistic varieties are found in the glyphic texts is probably that these served as prestige dialects throughout the Maya region; hieroglyphic texts would have been composed in the language of the elite.

Stephen Houston, John Robertson and David Stuart have suggested that the specific variety of Chʼolan found in the majority of Southern Lowland glyphic texts was a language they dub "Classic Chʼoltiʼan", the ancestor language of the modern Chʼortiʼ and Chʼoltiʼ languages. They propose that it originated in western and south-central Petén Basin, and that it was used in the inscriptions and perhaps also spoken by elites and priests. However, Mora-Marín has argued that traits shared by Classic Lowland Maya and the Chʼoltiʼan languages are retentions rather than innovations, and that the diversification of Chʼolan in fact post-dates the classic period. The language of the classical lowland inscriptions then would have been proto-Chʼolan.

=== Colonial period ===
During the Spanish colonization of Central America, all indigenous languages were eclipsed by Spanish, which became the new prestige language. The use of Mayan languages came to an end in many important domains of society, including administration, religion and literature. Yet the Maya area was more resistant to outside influence than others, (Note: The last independent Maya kingdom (Tayasal) was not conquered until 1697, some 170 years after the first conquistadores arrived. During the Colonial and Postcolonial periods, Maya peoples periodically rebelled against the colonizers, such as the Caste War of Yucatán, which extended into the 20th century.) and perhaps for this reason, many Maya communities still retain a high proportion of monolingual speakers. The Maya area is now dominated by the Spanish language. While a number of Mayan languages are moribund or are considered endangered, others remain quite viable, with speakers across all age groups and native language use in all domains of society. (Note: Grenoble & Whaley (1998) characterized the situation this way: "Mayan languages typically have several hundreds of thousands of speakers, and a majority of Mayas speak a Mayan language as a first language. The driving concern of Maya communities is not to revitalize their language but to buttress it against the increasingly rapid spread of Spanish ... [rather than being] at the end of a process of language shift, [Mayan languages are] ... at the beginning."Grenoble & Whaley (1998, pp. xi–xii))

=== Modern period ===
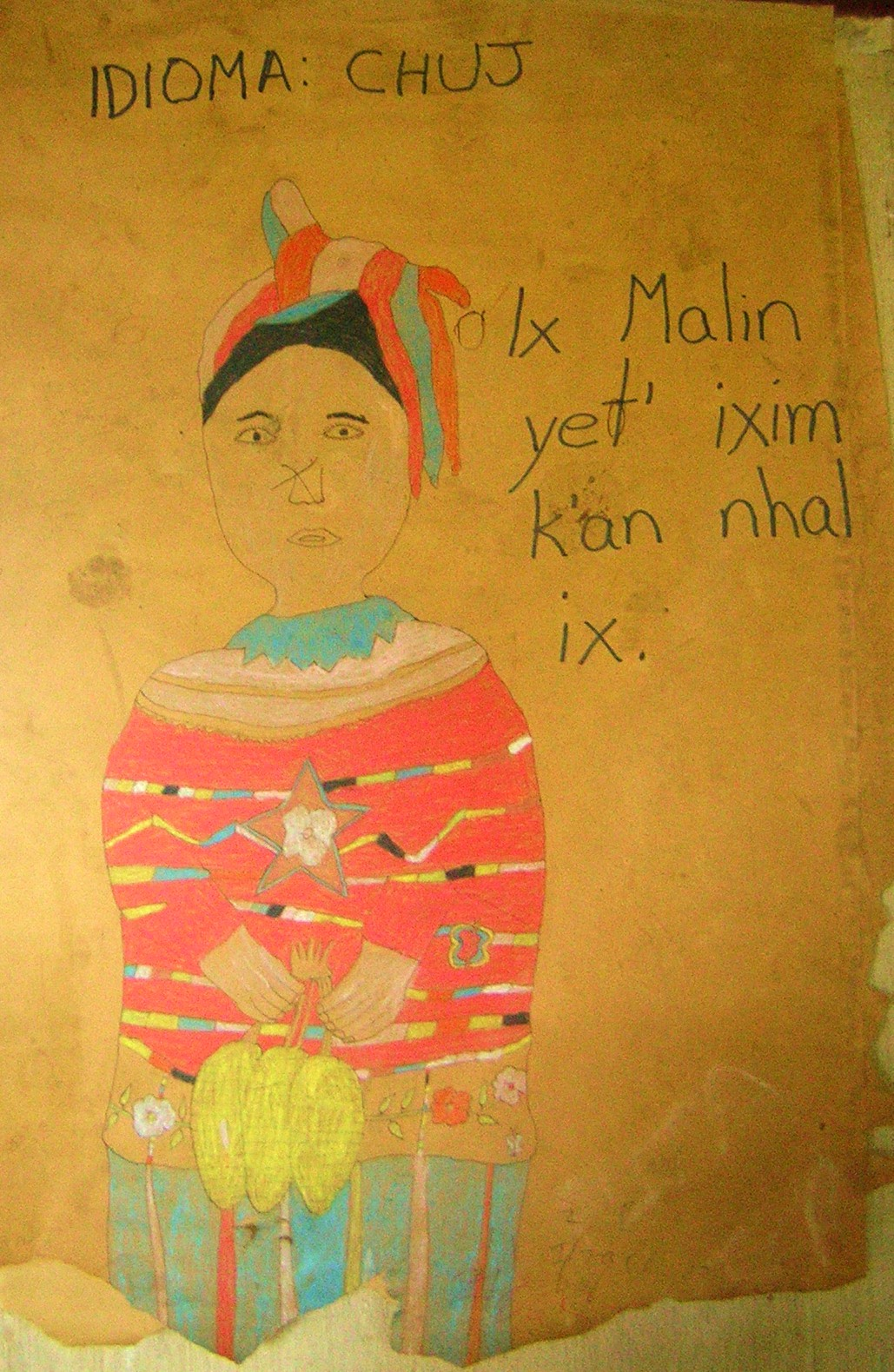
Drawing with text written in the Chuj language from Ixcán, Guatemala

As Maya archaeology advanced during the 20th century and nationalist and ethnic-pride-based ideologies spread, the Mayan-speaking peoples began to develop a shared ethnic identity as Maya, the heirs of the Maya civilization. (Note: Choi (2002) writes: "In the recent Maya cultural activism, maintenance of Mayan languages has been promoted in an attempt to support 'unified Maya identity'. However, there is a complex array of perceptions about Mayan language and identity among Maya who I researched in Momostenango, a highland Maya community in Guatemala. On the one hand, Maya denigrate Kʼicheʼ and have doubts about its potential to continue as a viable language because the command of Spanish is an economic and political necessity. On the other hand, they do recognize the value of Mayan language when they wish to claim the 'authentic Maya identity'. It is this conflation of conflicting and ambivalent ideologies that inform language choice...")

The word "Maya" was likely derived from the postclassical Yucatán city of Mayapan; its more restricted meaning in pre-colonial and colonial times points to an origin in a particular region of the Yucatán Peninsula. The broader meaning of "Maya" now current, while defined by linguistic relationships, is also used to refer to ethnic or cultural traits. Most Maya identify first and foremost with a particular ethnic group, e.g. as "Yucatec" or "Kʼicheʼ"; but they also recognize a shared Maya kinship. Language has been fundamental in defining the boundaries of that kinship. Fabri writes: "The term Maya is problematic because Maya peoples do not constitute a homogeneous identity. Maya, rather, has become a strategy of self-representation for the Maya movements and its followers. The Academia de Lenguas Mayas de Guatemala (ALMG) finds twenty-one distinct Mayan languages." This pride in unity has led to an insistence on the distinctions of different Mayan languages, some of which are so closely related that they could easily be referred to as dialects of a single language. But, given that the term "dialect" has been used by some with racialist overtones in the past, as scholars made a spurious distinction between Amerindian "dialects" and European "languages", the preferred usage in Mesoamerica in recent years has been to designate the linguistic varieties spoken by different ethnic group as separate languages. (Note: See Suárez (1983) chapter 2 for a thorough discussion of the usage and meanings of the words "dialect" and "language" in Mesoamerica.)

In Guatemala, matters such as developing standardized orthographies for the Mayan languages are governed by the Academia de Lenguas Mayas de Guatemala (ALMG; Guatemalan Academy of Mayan Languages), which was founded by Maya organisations in 1986. Following the 1996 peace accords, it has been gaining a growing recognition as the regulatory authority on Mayan languages both among Mayan scholars and the Maya peoples.

Such has been the scale of immigration from Central America to the U.S. that K'iche' (or Quiche) and Mam are as of 2025 two of the top languages in use at Immigration Court. In the San Francisco East Bay, a prime destination, Mayan languages flourish on the radio, local news outlets, and classrooms.

== Genealogy and classification ==
=== Relations with other families ===
The Mayan language family has no demonstrated genetic relationship to other language families. Similarities with some languages of Mesoamerica are understood to be due to diffusion of linguistic traits from neighboring languages into Mayan and not to common ancestry. Mesoamerica has been proven to be an area of substantial linguistic diffusion.

A wide range of proposals have tried to link the Mayan family to other language families or isolates, but none is generally supported by linguists. Examples include linking Mayan with the Uru–Chipaya languages, Mapuche, the Lencan languages, Purépecha, and Huave. Mayan has also been included in various Hokan, Penutian, and Siouan hypotheses. The linguist Joseph Greenberg included Mayan in his highly controversial Amerind hypothesis, which is rejected by most historical linguists as unsupported by available evidence.

Writing in 1997, Lyle Campbell, an expert in Mayan languages and historical linguistics, argued that the most promising proposal is the "Macro-Mayan" hypothesis, which posits links between Mayan, the Mixe–Zoque languages and the Totonacan languages, but more research is needed to support or disprove this hypothesis. In 2015, Campbell noted that recent evidence presented by David Mora-Marin makes the case for a relationship between Mayan and Mixe-Zoquean languages "much more plausible".

=== Subdivisions ===
The Mayan family consists of thirty languages. Typically, these languages are grouped into 5–6 major subgroups (Yucatecan, Huastecan, Chʼolan–Tzeltalan, Qʼanjobʼalan, Mamean, and Kʼichean). The Mayan language family is extremely well documented, and its internal genealogical classification scheme is widely accepted and established, except for some minor unresolved differences.

One point still at issue is the position of Chʼolan and Qʼanjobalan–Chujean. Some scholars think these form a separate Western branch (as in the diagram below). Other linguists do not support the positing of an especially close relationship between Chʼolan and Qʼanjobalan–Chujean; consequently they classify these as two distinct branches emanating directly from the proto-language. An alternative proposed classification groups the Huastecan branch as springing from the Chʼolan–Tzeltalan node, rather than as an outlying branch springing directly from the proto-Mayan node.

Genealogy of Mayan languages.

== Distribution ==
Present geographic distribution of Mayan languages in Mexico and Central America

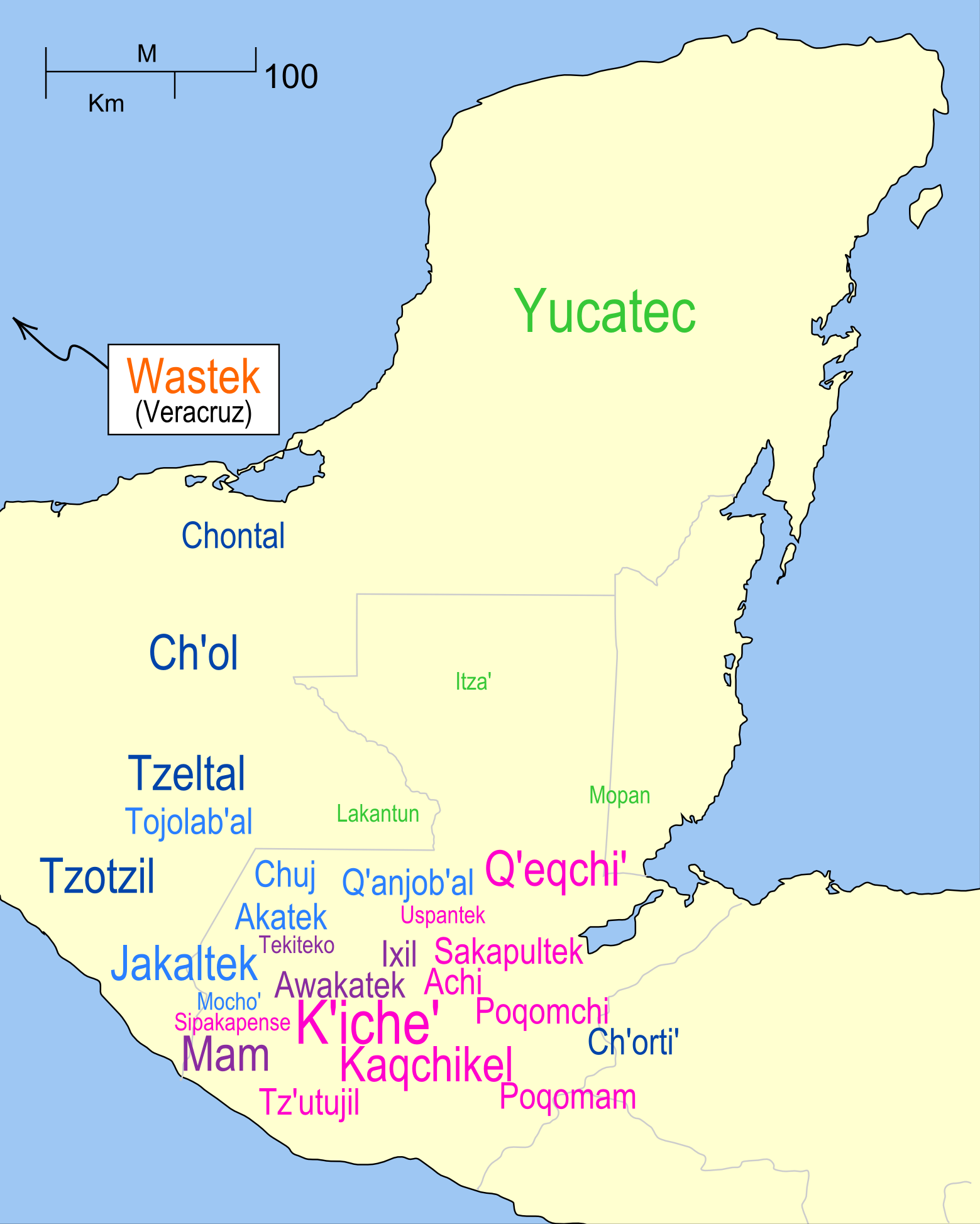
Map of Mayan language communities—font size indicates relative size of speaker population. (Yucatec and Kʼicheʼ with 900,000 and 400,000 speakers respectively; 100,000–500,000 speakers; 10,000–100,000 speakers; and under 10,000 speakers.)

Studies estimate that Mayan languages are spoken by more than six million people. Most of them live in Guatemala where, depending on estimates, 40%–60% of the population speaks a Mayan language. In Mexico the Mayan speaking population was estimated at 2.5 million people in 2010, whereas the Belizean speaker population figures around 30,000.

=== Western branch ===
The Chʼolan languages were formerly widespread throughout the Maya area, but today the most widely spoken Chʼolan language is Chʼol, spoken by 130,000 in Chiapas. Its closest relative, the Chontal Maya language, (Note: Chontal Maya is not to be confused with the Tequistlatecan languages that are referred to as "Chontal of Oaxaca".) is spoken by 55,000 in the state of Tabasco. Another related language, now endangered, is Chʼortiʼ, which is spoken by 30,000 in Guatemala. It is also spoken in the extreme west of Honduras and El Salvador although its distribution is scarce. Chʼoltiʼ, a sister language of Chʼortiʼ, is also extinct. Chʼolan languages are believed to be the most conservative in vocabulary and phonology, and are closely related to the language of the Classic-era inscriptions found in the Central Lowlands. They may have served as prestige languages, coexisting with other dialects in some areas. This assumption provides a plausible explanation for the geographical distance between the Chʼortiʼ zone and the areas where Chʼol and Chontal are spoken.

The closest relatives of the Chʼolan languages are the languages of the Tzeltalan branch, Tzotzil and Tzeltal, both spoken in Chiapas by large and stable or growing populations (265,000 for Tzotzil and 215,000 for Tzeltal). Tzeltal has tens of thousands of monolingual speakers.

Qʼanjobʼal is spoken by 77,700 in Guatemala's Huehuetenango department, with small populations elsewhere. The region of Qʼanjobalan speakers in Guatemala, due to genocidal policies during the Civil War and its close proximity to the Mexican border, was the source of a number of refugees. Thus there are now small Qʼanjobʼal, Jakaltek, and Akatek populations in various locations in Mexico, the United States (such as Tuscarawas County, Ohio, and Los Angeles, California), and, through postwar resettlement, other parts of Guatemala. Jakaltek (also known as Poptiʼ) is spoken by almost 100,000 in several municipalities of Huehuetenango. Another member of this branch is Akatek, with over 50,000 speakers in San Miguel Acatán and San Rafael La Independencia.

Chuj is spoken by 40,000 people in Huehuetenango, and by 9,500 people, primarily refugees, over the border in Mexico, in the municipality of La Trinitaria, Chiapas, and the villages of Tziscau and Cuauhtémoc. Tojolabʼal is spoken in eastern Chiapas by 36,000 people.

=== Eastern branch ===
The Quichean–Mamean languages and dialects, with two sub-branches and three subfamilies, are spoken in the Guatemalan highlands.

Qʼeqchiʼ (sometimes spelled Kekchi), which constitutes its own sub-branch within Quichean–Mamean, is spoken by about 800,000 people in the southern Petén, Izabal and Alta Verapaz departments of Guatemala, and also in Belize by 9,000 speakers. In El Salvador it is spoken by 12,000 as a result of recent migrations.

The Uspantek language, which also springs directly from the Quichean–Mamean node, is native only to the Uspantán municipio in the department of El Quiché, and has 3,000 speakers.

Within the Quichean sub-branch Kʼicheʼ (Quiché), the Mayan language with the largest number of speakers, is spoken by around 1,000,000 Kʼicheʼ Maya in the Guatemalan highlands, around the towns of Chichicastenango and Quetzaltenango and in the Cuchumatán mountains, as well as by urban emigrants in Guatemala City. The famous Maya mythological document, Popol Vuh, is written in an antiquated Kʼicheʼ often called Classical Kʼicheʼ (or Quiché). The Kʼicheʼ culture was at its pinnacle at the time of the Spanish conquest. Qʼumarkaj, near the present-day city of Santa Cruz del Quiché, was its economic and ceremonial center. Achi is spoken by 85,000 people in Cubulco and Rabinal, two municipios of Baja Verapaz. In some classifications, e.g. the one by Campbell, Achi is counted as a form of Kʼicheʼ. However, owing to a historical division between the two ethnic groups, the Achi Maya do not regard themselves as Kʼicheʼ. (Note: The Ethnologue considers the dialects spoken in Cubulco and Rabinal to be distinct languages, two of the eight languages of a Quiché-Achi family. Raymond G., Gordon Jr. (ed.). Ethnologue, (2005). Language Family Tree for Mayan, accessed March 26, 2007.) The Kaqchikel language is spoken by about 400,000 people in an area stretching from Guatemala City westward to the northern shore of Lake Atitlán. Tzʼutujil has about 90,000 speakers in the vicinity of Lake Atitlán. Other members of the Kʼichean branch are Sakapultek, spoken by about 15,000 people mostly in El Quiché department, and Sipakapense, which is spoken by 8,000 people in Sipacapa, San Marcos.

The largest language in the Mamean sub-branch is Mam, spoken by 478,000 people in the departments of San Marcos and Huehuetenango. Awakatek is the language of 20,000 inhabitants of central Aguacatán, another municipality of Huehuetenango. Ixil (possibly three different languages) is spoken by 70,000 in the "Ixil Triangle" region of the department of El Quiché. Tektitek (or Teko) is spoken by over 6,000 people in the municipality of Tectitán, and 1,000 refugees in Mexico. According to the Ethnologue the number of speakers of Tektitek is growing.

The Poqom languages are closely related to Core Quichean, with which they constitute a Poqom-Kʼichean sub-branch on the Quichean–Mamean node. Poqomchiʼ is spoken by 90,000 people in Purulhá, Baja Verapaz, and in the following municipalities of Alta Verapaz: Santa Cruz Verapaz, San Cristóbal Verapaz, Tactic, Tamahú and Tucurú. Poqomam is spoken by around 49,000 people in several small pockets in Guatemala.

=== Yucatecan branch ===
The area where Yucatec Maya is spoken in the peninsula of Yucatán

Yucatec Maya (known simply as "Maya" to its speakers) is the second-most commonly spoken Mayan language. It is currently spoken by approximately 800,000 people, the vast majority of whom are to be found on the Yucatán Peninsula. It remains common in Yucatán and in the adjacent states of Quintana Roo and Campeche. Yucatec Maya people also live in Northern Belize.

The other three Yucatecan languages are Mopan, spoken by around 10,000 speakers primarily in Belize; Itzaʼ, an extinct or moribund language from Guatemala's Petén Basin; and Lacandón or Lakantum, also severely endangered with about 1,000 speakers in a few villages on the outskirts of the Selva Lacandona, in Chiapas.

=== Huastecan branch ===
Wastek (also spelled Huastec and Huaxtec) is spoken in the Mexican states of Veracruz and San Luis Potosí by around 110,000 people. It is the most divergent of modern Mayan languages. Chicomuceltec was a language related to Wastek and spoken in Chiapas that became extinct some time before 1982.

== Phonology ==
=== Proto-Mayan sound system ===
Proto-Mayan (the common ancestor of the Mayan languages as reconstructed using the comparative method) has a predominant CVC syllable structure, only allowing consonant clusters across syllable boundaries. (Note: Proto-Mayan allowed roots of the shape CVC, CVVC, CVhC, CVʔC, and CVSC (where S is /s/, /ʃ/, or /x/)); see England (1994, pp. 77)) Most Proto-Mayan roots were monosyllabic except for a few disyllabic nominal roots. Due to subsequent vowel loss, many Mayan languages now show complex consonant clusters at both ends of syllables. Following the reconstruction of Lyle Campbell and Terrence Kaufman, the Proto-Mayan language had the following sounds. It has been suggested that proto-Mayan was a tonal language, based on the fact that four different contemporary Mayan languages have tone (Yucatec, Uspantek, San Bartolo Tzotzil (Note: Campbell (2015) mistakenly writes Tzeltal for Tzotzil, Avelino & Shin (2011) states that the reports of a fully developed tone contrast in San Bartolome Tzotzil are inaccurate) and Mochoʼ), but since these languages each can be shown to have innovated tone in different ways, Campbell considers this unlikely.

Proto-Mayan vowels
	Front		Central		Back	
	Short	Long	Short	Long	Short	Long
High	i	iː			u	uː
Mid	e	eː			o	oː
Low			a	aː		

Proto-Mayan consonants
		Bilabial	Alveolar	Palatal	Velar	Uvular	Glottal
Nasal		m	n		ŋ		
Plosive	Plain	p	t	tʲ	k	q	ʔ
Plosive	Glottalic	ɓ	tʼ	tʲʼ	kʼ	qʼ	ʔ
Affricate	Plain		t͡s	t͡ʃ			
Affricate	Glottalic		t͡sʼ	t͡ʃʼ			
Fricative			s	ʃ		χ	h
Liquid			l r				
Glide				j	w		

=== Phonological evolution of Proto-Mayan ===
The classification of Mayan languages is based on changes shared between groups of languages. For example, languages of the western group (such as Huastecan, Yucatecan and Chʼolan) all changed the Proto-Mayan phoneme */r/ into [j], some languages of the eastern branch retained [r] (Kʼichean), and others changed it into [tʃ] or, word-finally, [t] (Mamean). The shared innovations between Huastecan, Yucatecan and Chʼolan show that they separated from the other Mayan languages before the changes found in other branches had taken place.

Reflexes of Proto-Mayan *[r] in daughter languages
Proto-Mayan	Wastek	Yucatec	Mopan	Tzeltal	Chuj	Qʼanjobʼal	Mam	Ixil	Kʼicheʼ	Kaqchikel	Poqomam	Qʼeqchiʼ
*[raʔʃ] "green"	[jaʃ]	[jaʔʃ]	[jaʔaʃ]	[jaʃ]	[jaʔaʃ]	[jaʃ]	[tʃaʃ]	[tʃaʔʃ]	[raʃ]	[rɐʃ]	[raʃ]	[raʃ]
*[war] "sleep"	[waj]	[waj]	[wɐjn]	[waj]	[waj]	[waj]	[wit] (Awakatek)	[wat]	[war]	[war]	[wɨr]	[war]

The palatalized plosives [tʲʼ] and [tʲ] are not found in most of the modern families. Instead they are reflected differently in different branches, allowing a reconstruction of these phonemes as palatalized plosives. In the eastern branch (Chujean-Qʼanjobalan and Chʼolan) they are reflected as [t] and [tʼ]. In Mamean they are reflected as [ts] and [tsʼ] and in Quichean as [tʃ] and [tʃʼ]. Yucatec stands out from other western languages in that its palatalized plosives are sometimes changed into [tʃ] and sometimes [t].

Reflexes of Proto-Mayan [tʲʼ] and [tʲ]
Proto-Mayan	Yucatec	Ch'ol	Chʼortiʼ	Chuj	Qʼanjobʼal	Poptiʼ (Jakaltek)	Mam	Ixil	Kʼicheʼ	Kaqchikel
*[tʲeːʔ] "tree"	[tʃeʔ]	/tʲeʔ/	/teʔ/	/teʔ/	[teʔ]	[teʔ]	[tseːʔ]	[tseʔ]	[tʃeːʔ]	[tʃeʔ]
*[tʲaʔŋ] "ashes"	[taʔn]			/taʔaŋ/	[tan]	[taŋ]	[tsaːx]	[tsaʔ]	[tʃaːx]	[tʃax]

The Proto-Mayan velar nasal *[ŋ] is reflected as [x] in the eastern branches (Quichean–Mamean), [n] in Qʼanjobalan, Chʼolan and Yucatecan, [h] in Huastecan, and only conserved as [ŋ] in Chuj and Jakaltek.

Reflexes of Proto-Mayan [ŋ]
Proto-Mayan	Yucatec	Chʼortiʼ	Qʼanjobal	Chuj	Jakaltek (Poptiʼ)	Ixil	Kʼicheʼ
*[ŋeːh] "tail"	[neːh]	/nex/	[ne]	/ŋeh/	[ŋe]	[xeh]	[xeːʔ]

=== Diphthongs ===
Vowel quality is typically classified as having monophthongal vowels. In traditionally diphthongized contexts, Mayan languages will realize the V-V sequence by inserting a hiatus-breaking glottal stop or glide insertion between the vowels. Some Kʼichean-branch languages have exhibited developed diphthongs from historical long vowels, by breaking /e:/ and /o:/.

== Grammar ==
The morphology of Mayan languages is simpler than that of other Mesoamerican languages, (Note: Suárez (1983, p. 65) writes: "Neither Tarascan nor Mayan have words as complex as those found in Nahuatl, Totonac or Mixe–Zoque, but, in different ways both have a rich morphology.") yet its morphology is still considered agglutinating and polysynthetic. Verbs are marked for aspect or tense, the person of the subject, the person of the object (in the case of transitive verbs), and for plurality of person. Possessed nouns are marked for person of possessor. In Mayan languages, nouns are not marked for case, and gender is not explicitly marked.

=== Word order ===
Proto-Mayan is thought to have had a basic verb–object–subject word order with possibilities of switching to VSO in certain circumstances, such as complex sentences, sentences where object and subject were of equal animacy and when the subject was definite. (Note: Lyle Campbell (1997) refers to studies by Norman and Campbell ((1978) "Toward a proto-Mayan syntax: a comparative perspective on grammar", in Papers in Mayan Linguistics, ed. Nora C. England, pp. 136–56. Columbia: Museum of Anthropology, University of Missouri) and by England (1991).) Today Yucatecan, Tzotzil and Tojolabʼal have a basic fixed VOS word order. Mamean, Qʼanjobʼal, Jakaltek and one dialect of Chuj have a fixed VSO one. Only Chʼortiʼ has a basic SVO word order. Other Mayan languages allow both VSO and VOS word orders.

=== Numeral classifiers ===
In many Mayan languages, counting requires the use of numeral classifiers, which specify the class of items being counted; the numeral cannot appear without an accompanying classifier. Some Mayan languages, such as Kaqchikel, do not use numeral classifiers. Class is usually assigned according to whether the object is animate or inanimate or according to an object's general shape. Thus when counting "flat" objects, a different form of numeral classifier is used than when counting round things, oblong items or people. In some Mayan languages such as Chontal, classifiers take the form of affixes attached to the numeral; in others such as Tzeltal, they are free forms. Jakaltek has both numeral classifiers and noun classifiers, and the noun classifiers can also be used as pronouns.

The meaning denoted by a noun may be altered significantly by changing the accompanying classifier. In Chontal, for example, when the classifier -tek is used with names of plants it is understood that the objects being enumerated are whole trees. If in this expression a different classifier, -tsʼit (for counting long, slender objects) is substituted for -tek, this conveys the meaning that only sticks or branches of the tree are being counted:

Semantic differences in numeral classifiers (from Chontal)
untek wop (one-tree Jahuacte)	untsʼit wop (one-stick jahuacte)
un- tek wop one- "plant" {jahuacte tree} "one jahuacte tree"	un- tsʼit wop one- {"long.slender.object"} {jahuacte tree} "one stick from a jahuacte tree"

=== Possession ===
The morphology of Mayan nouns is fairly simple: they inflect for number (plural or singular), and, when possessed, for person and number of their possessor. Pronominal possession is expressed by a set of possessive prefixes attached to the noun, as in Kaqchikel ru-kej "his/her horse". Nouns may furthermore adopt a special form marking them as possessed. For nominal possessors, the possessed noun is inflected as possessed by a third-person possessor, and followed by the possessor noun, e.g. Kaqchikel ru-kej ri achin "the man's horse" (literally "his horse the man"). This type of formation is a main diagnostic trait of the Mesoamerican Linguistic Area and recurs throughout Mesoamerica.

Mayan languages often contrast alienable and inalienable possession by varying the way the noun is (or is not) marked as possessed. Jakaltek, for example, contrasts inalienably possessed wetʃel "my photo (in which I am depicted)" with alienably possessed wetʃele "my photo (taken by me)". The prefix we- marks the first person singular possessor in both, but the absence of the -e possessive suffix in the first form marks inalienable possession.

=== Relational nouns ===
Mayan languages which have prepositions at all normally have only one. To express location and other relations between entities, use is made of a special class of "relational nouns". This pattern is also recurrent throughout Mesoamerica and is another diagnostic trait of the Mesoamerican Linguistic Area. In Mayan most relational nouns are metaphorically derived from body parts so that "on top of", for example, is expressed by the word for head.

=== Subjects and objects ===
Mayan languages are ergative in their alignment. This means that the subject of an intransitive verb is treated similarly to the object of a transitive verb, but differently from the subject of a transitive verb.

Mayan languages have two sets of affixes that are attached to a verb to indicate the person of its arguments. One set (often referred to in Mayan grammars as set B) indicates the person of subjects of intransitive verbs, and of objects of transitive verbs. They can also be used with adjective or noun predicates to indicate the subject.

Set B
Usage	Language of example	Example	Translation
Subject of an intransitive verb	Kaqchikel	x-ix-ok	"You [plural] entered"
Object of a transitive verb	Kaqchikel	x-ix-ru-chöp	"He/she took you [plural]"
Subject of an adjective predicate	Kaqchikel	ix-samajel	"You [plural] are hard-working."
Subject of a noun predicate	Tzotzil	ʼantz-ot	"You are a woman."

Another set (set A) is used to indicate the person of subjects of transitive verbs (and in some languages, such as Yucatec, also the subjects of intransitive verbs, but only in the incompletive aspects), and also the possessors of nouns (including relational nouns). (Note: Another view has been suggested by Carlos Lenkersdorf, an anthropologist who studied the Tojolabʼal language. He argued that a native Tojolabʼal speaker makes no cognitive distinctions between subject and object, or even between active and passive, animate and inanimate, seeing both subject and object as active participants in an action. For instance, in Tojolabʼal rather than saying "I teach you", one says the equivalent of "I-teach you-learn". See Lenkersdorf (1996, pp. 60–62))

Set A
Usage	Language of example	Example	Translation
Subject of a transitive verb	Kaqchikel	x-ix-ru-chöp	"He/she took you guys"
Possessive marker	Kaqchikel	ru-kej ri achin	"the man's horse" (literally: "his horse the man")
Relational marker	Classical Kʼicheʼ	u-wach ulew	"on the earth" (literally: "its face the earth", i.e. "face of the earth")

=== Verbs ===
In addition to subject and object (agent and patient), the Mayan verb has affixes signalling aspect, tense, and mood as in the following example:

Mayan verb structure

Aspect/mood/tense {Class A prefix} {Class B prefix} Root Aspect/mood/voice Plural
k- in- a- chʼay -o {}
INCOMPL 1SG.P 2SG.A hit INCOMPL {}
(Kʼicheʼ) kinachʼayo "You are hitting me"

Tense systems in Mayan languages are generally simple. Jakaltek, for example, contrasts only past and non-past, while Mam has only future and non-future. Aspect systems are normally more prominent. Mood does not normally form a separate system in Mayan, but is instead intertwined with the tense/aspect system. Kaufman has reconstructed a tense/aspect/mood system for proto-Mayan that includes seven aspects: incompletive, progressive, completive/punctual, imperative, potential/future, optative, and perfective.

Mayan languages tend to have a rich set of grammatical voices. Proto-Mayan had at least one passive construction as well as an antipassive rule for downplaying the importance of the agent in relation to the patient. Modern Kʼicheʼ has two antipassives: one which ascribes focus to the object and another that emphasizes the verbal action. Other voice-related constructions occurring in Mayan languages are the following: mediopassive, incorporational (incorporating a direct object into the verb), instrumental (promoting the instrument to object position) and referential (a kind of applicative promoting an indirect argument such as a benefactive or recipient to the object position).

=== Statives and positionals ===
In Mayan languages, statives are a class of predicative words expressing a quality or state, whose syntactic properties fall in between those of verbs and adjectives in Indo-European languages. Like verbs, statives can sometimes be inflected for person but normally lack inflections for tense, aspect and other purely verbal categories. Statives can be adjectives, positionals or numerals.

Positionals, a class of roots characteristic of, if not unique to, the Mayan languages, form stative adjectives and verbs (usually with the help of suffixes) with meanings related to the position or shape of an object or person. Mayan languages have between 250 and 500 distinct positional roots:

Telan ay jun naq winaq yul bʼe.

There is a man lying down fallen on the road.

Woqan hin kʼal ay max ekkʼu.

I spent the entire day sitting down.

Yet ewi xoyan ay jun lobʼaj stina.

Yesterday there was a snake lying curled up in the entrance of the house.

In these three Qʼanjobʼal sentences, the positionals are telan ("something large or cylindrical lying down as if having fallen"), woqan ("person sitting on a chairlike object"), and xoyan ("curled up like a rope or snake").

=== Word formation ===
Compounding of noun roots to form new nouns is commonplace; there are also many morphological processes to derive nouns from verbs. Verbs also admit highly productive derivational affixes of several kinds, most of which specify transitivity or voice.

As in other Mesoamerican languages, there is a widespread metaphorical use of roots denoting body parts, particularly to form locatives and relational nouns, such as Kaqchikel -pan ("inside" and "stomach") or -wi ("head-hair" and "on top of").

== Mayan loanwords ==
A number of loanwords of Mayan or potentially Mayan origins are found in many other languages, principally Spanish, English, and some neighboring Mesoamerican languages like Tapachultec, Xincan, Lencan and Jicaquean, and one or two items each in Cacaopera, Sumo and Pech. In addition, Mayan languages have borrowed words, mainly from Spanish, but also from Mixe-Zoque and especially Nahuatl in the prehispanic period.

One Mayan loanword is cigar. The Mayan word for "tobacco" is sic and sicar means "to smoke tobacco leaves". This is the most likely origin for cigar and thus cigarette.

The English word "hurricane", which is a borrowing from the Spanish word huracán is considered by some to be related to the name of Maya storm deity Jun Raqan. However, it is more likely that the word passed into European languages from the Kalinago language or Taíno.

== Writing systems ==
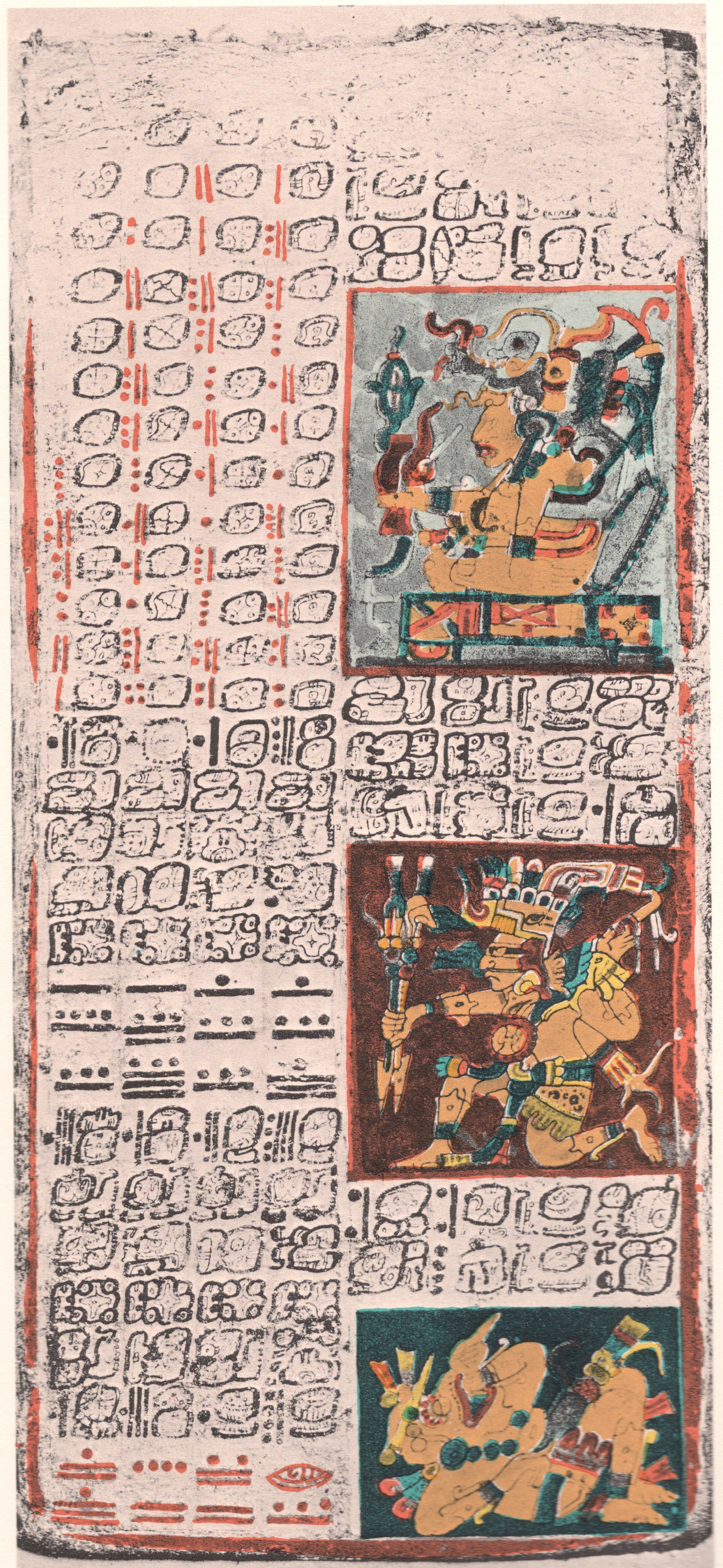
Yucatec Maya writing in the Dresden Codex, c. 11–12th century, Chichen Itza

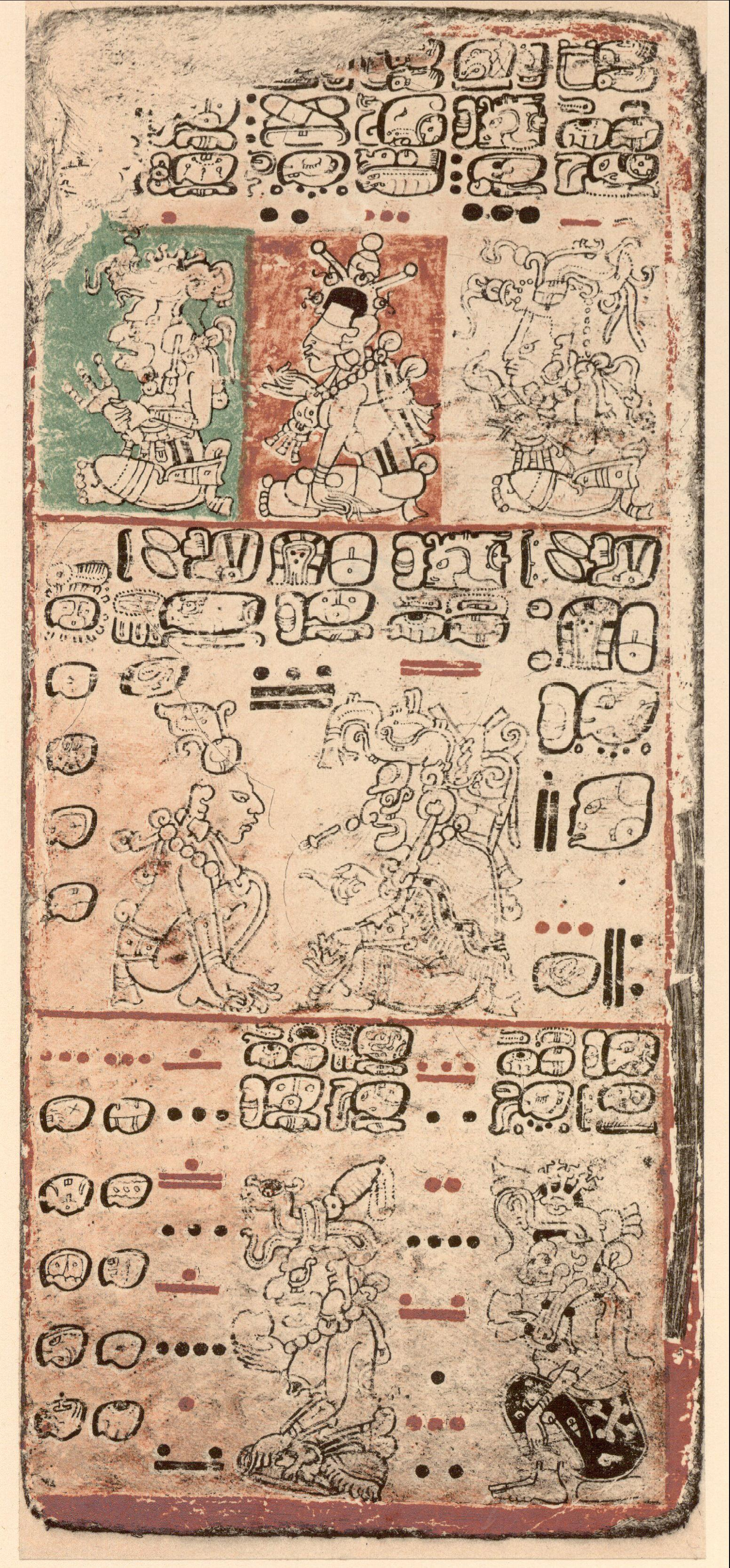
Page 9 of the Dresden Codex showing the classic Maya language written in Mayan hieroglyphs (from the 1880 Förstermann edition)

The complex script used to write Mayan languages in pre-Columbian times and known today from engravings at several Maya archaeological sites has been deciphered almost completely. The script is a mix between a logographic and a syllabic system.

In colonial times Mayan languages came to be written in a script derived from the Latin alphabet; orthographies were developed mostly by missionary grammarians. Not all modern Mayan languages have standardized orthographies, but the Mayan languages of Guatemala use a standardized, Latin-based phonemic spelling system developed by the Academia de Lenguas Mayas de Guatemala (ALMG). Orthographies for the languages of Mexico are currently being developed by the Instituto Nacional de Lenguas Indígenas (INALI).

=== Glyphic writing ===
Two different ways of writing the word bʼalam "jaguar" in the Maya script. First as logogram representing the entire word with the single glyph BʼALAM, then phonetically using the three syllable signs bʼa, la, and ma.
Three ways to write bʼalam using combinations of the logogram with the syllabic signs as phonetic complements

The pre-Columbian Maya civilization developed and used an intricate and fully functional writing system, which is the only Mesoamerican script that can be said to be almost fully deciphered. Earlier-established civilizations to the west and north of the Maya homelands that also had scripts recorded in surviving inscriptions include the Zapotec, Olmec, and the Zoque-speaking peoples of the southern Veracruz and western Chiapas area—but their scripts are as yet largely undeciphered. It is generally agreed that the Maya writing system was adapted from one or more of these earlier systems. A number of references identify the undeciphered Olmec script as its most likely precursor.

In the course of the deciphering of the Maya hieroglyphic script, scholars have come to understand that it was a fully functioning writing system in which it was possible to express unambiguously any sentence of the spoken language. The system is of a type best classified as logosyllabic, in which symbols (glyphs or graphemes) can be used as either logograms or syllables. The script has a complete syllabary (although not all possible syllables have yet been identified), and a Maya scribe would have been able to write anything phonetically, syllable by syllable, using these symbols.

At least two major Mayan languages have been confidently identified in hieroglyphic texts, with at least one other language probably identified. An archaic language variety known as Classic Maya predominates in these texts, particularly in the Classic-era inscriptions of the southern and central lowland areas. This language is most closely related to the Chʼolan branch of the language family, modern descendants of which include Chʼol, Chʼortiʼ and Chontal. Inscriptions in an early Yucatecan language (the ancestor of the main surviving Yucatec language) have also been recognised or proposed, mainly in the Yucatán Peninsula region and from a later period. Three of the four extant Maya codices are based on Yucatec. It has also been surmised that some inscriptions found in the Chiapas highlands region may be in a Tzeltalan language whose modern descendants are Tzeltal and Tzotzil. Other regional varieties and dialects are also presumed to have been used, but have not yet been identified with certainty.

Use and knowledge of the Maya script continued until the 16th century Spanish conquest at least. Bishop Diego de Landa Calderón of the Catholic Archdiocese of Yucatán prohibited the use of the written language, effectively ending the Mesoamerican tradition of literacy in the native script. He worked with the Spanish colonizers to destroy the bulk of Mayan texts as part of his efforts to convert the locals to Christianity and away from what he perceived as pagan idolatry. Later he described the use of hieroglyphic writing in the religious practices of Yucatecan Maya in his Relación de las cosas de Yucatán.

=== Colonial orthography ===
Colonial orthography is marked by the use of c for /k/ (always hard, as in cic /kiik/), k for /q/ in Guatemala or for /kʼ/ in the Yucatán, h for /x/, and tz for /ts/; the absence of glottal stop or vowel length (apart sometimes for a double vowel letter for a long glottalized vowel, as in uuc /uʼuk/), the use of u for /w/, as in uac /wak/, and the variable use of z, ç, s for /s/. The greatest difference from modern orthography, however, is in the various attempts to transcribe the ejective consonants.

About 1550, Francisco de la Parra invented distinctive letters for ejectives in the Mayan languages of Guatemala, the tresillo and cuatrillo (and derivatives). These were used in all subsequent Franciscan writing, and are occasionally seen even today [2005]. In 1605, Alonso Urbano doubled consonants for ejectives in Otomi (pp, tt, ttz, cc / cqu), and similar systems were adapted to Mayan. Another approach, in Yucatec, was to add a bar to the letter, or to double the stem.

Phoneme	Yucatec	Parra
pʼ	⟨pp⟩, ⟨ꝑ⟩, ⟨ꝑꝑ⟩, ⟨𝕡⟩*	
tʼ	⟨th⟩, ⟨tħ⟩, ⟨ŧ⟩	⟨tt⟩, ⟨th⟩
tsʼ	⟨ɔ⟩, ⟨dz⟩	⟨ꜯ⟩
tʃʼ	⟨cħ⟩	⟨ꜯh⟩
kʼ	⟨k⟩	⟨ꜭ⟩
qʼ		⟨ꜫ⟩

*Only the stem of ⟨𝕡⟩ is doubled, but that is not supported by Unicode.

A ligature ⟨ꜩ⟩ for ⟨tz⟩ is used alongside ⟨ꜭ⟩ and ⟨ꜫ⟩. The Yucatec convention of ⟨dz⟩ for /tsʼ/ is retained in Maya family names such as Dzib.

=== Modern orthography ===
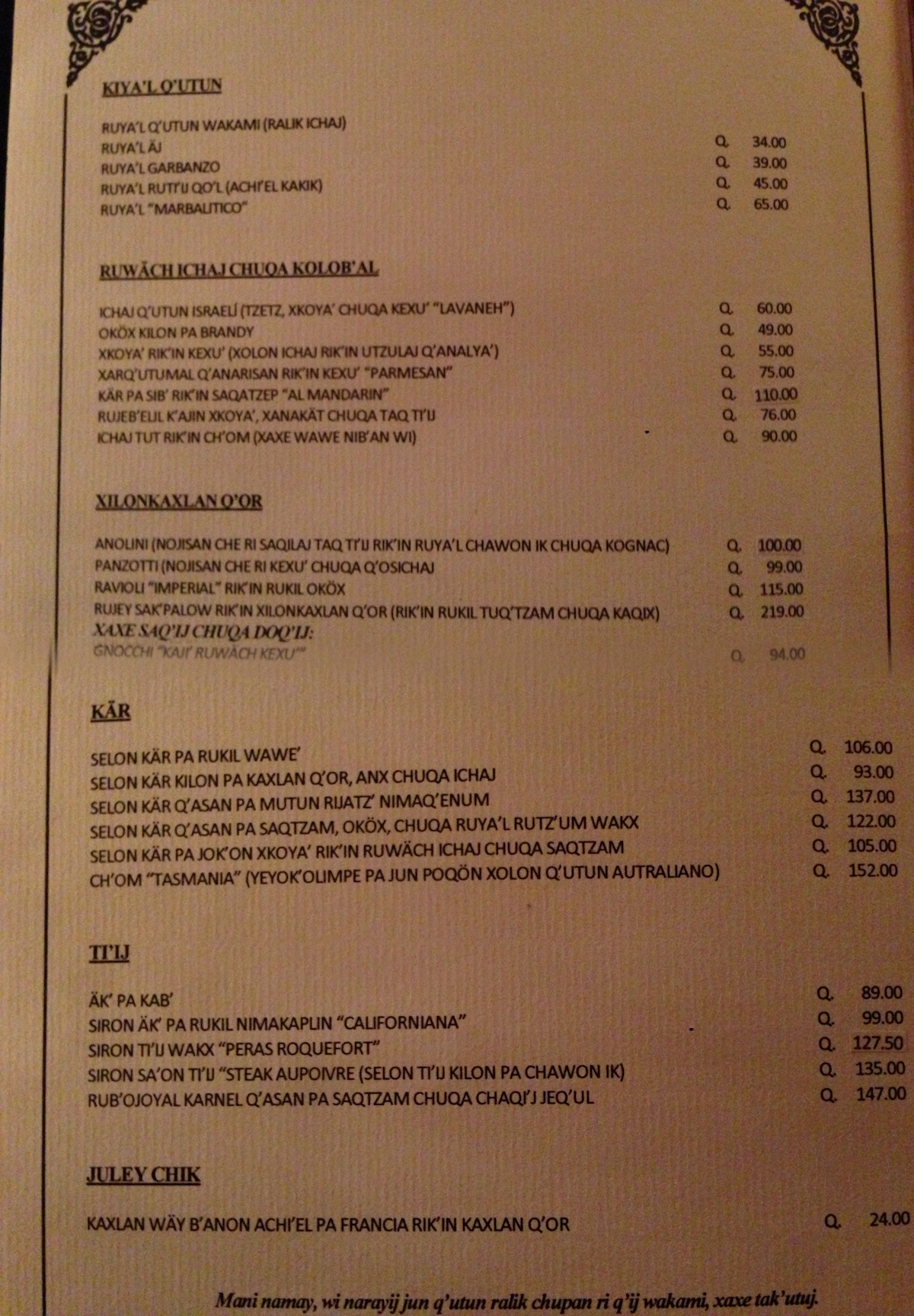
Dinner menu in Kaqchikel, Antigua, Guatemala

Since the colonial period, practically all Maya writing has used a Latin alphabet. Formerly these were based largely on the Spanish alphabet and varied between authors, and it is only recently that standardized alphabets have been established. The first widely accepted alphabet was created for Yucatec Maya by the authors and contributors of the Diccionario Maya Cordemex, a project directed by Alfredo Barrera Vásquez and first published in 1980. (Note: The Cordemex contains a lengthy introduction on the history, importance, and key resources of written Yucatec Maya, including a summary of the orthography used by the project (pp. 39a-42a).) Subsequently, the Guatemalan Academy of Mayan Languages (known by its Spanish acronym ALMG), founded in 1986, adapted these standards to 22 Mayan languages (primarily in Guatemala). The script is largely phonemic, but abandoned the distinction between the apostrophe for ejective consonants and the glottal stop, so that ejective /tʼ/ and the non-ejective sequence /tʔ/ (previously tʼ and t7) are both written tʼ. Other major Maya languages, primarily in the Mexican state of Chiapas, such as Tzotzil, Tzeltal, Chʼol, and Tojolabʼal, are not generally included in this reformation, and are sometimes written with the conventions standardized by the Chiapan "State Center for Indigenous Language, Art, and Literature" (CELALI), which for instance writes "ts" rather than "tz" (thus Tseltal and Tsotsil).

ALMG orthography for the phonemes of Mayan languages
Vowels						Consonants									
ALMG	IPA	ALMG	IPA	ALMG	IPA	ALMG	IPA	ALMG	IPA	ALMG	IPA	ALMG	IPA	ALMG	IPA
a	[a]	aa	[aː]	ä	[ɐ]	bʼ	[ɓ]	b	[b]	ch	[t͡ʃ]	chʼ	[t͡ʃʼ]	h	[h]
e	[e]	ee	[eː]	ë	[ɛ]	j	[χ]	l	[l]	k	[k]	kʼ	[kʼ]	m	[m]
i	[i]	ii	[iː]	ï	[ɪ]	y	[j]	p	[p]	q	[q]	qʼ	[qʼ]	n	[n]
o	[o]	oo	[oː]	ö	[ɤ̞]	s	[s]	x	[ʃ]	t	[t]	tʼ	[tʼ]	nh	[ŋ]
u	[u]	uu	[uː]	ü	[ʊ]	w	[w]	r	[r]	tz	[t͡s]	tzʼ	[t͡sʼ]	ʼ	[ʔ]
In tonal languages (primarily Yucatec), a high tone is indicated with an accent, as with "á" or "ée".

For the languages that make a distinction between palato-alveolar and retroflex affricates and fricatives (Mam, Ixil, Tektitek, Awakatek, Qʼanjobʼal, Poptiʼ, and Akatek in Guatemala, and Yucatec in Mexico) the ALMG suggests the following set of conventions.

ALMG convention for palato-alveolar and retroflex consonants
ALMG	IPA	ALMG	IPA	ALMG	IPA
ch	[tʃ]	chʼ	[tʃʼ]	x	[ʃ]
tx	[tʂ]	txʼ	[tʂʼ]	xh	[ʂ]

== Literature ==
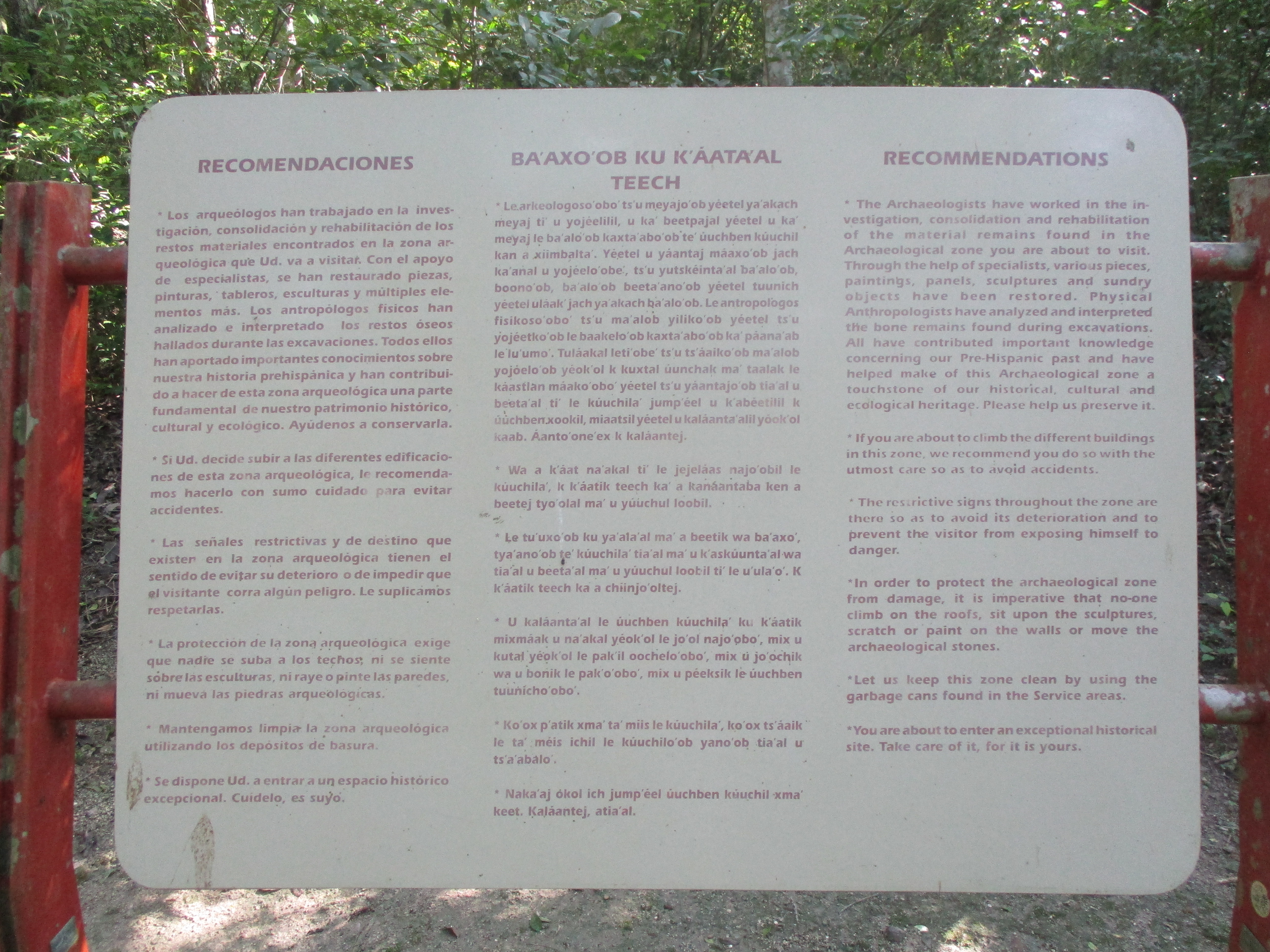
Trilingual text in Calakmul: Spanish, Yucatec Maya and English

From the classic language to the present day, a body of literature has been written in Mayan languages. The earliest texts to have been preserved are largely monumental inscriptions documenting rulership, succession, and ascension, conquest and calendrical and astronomical events. It is likely that other kinds of literature were written in perishable media such as codices made of bark, only four of which have survived the ravages of time and the campaign of destruction by Spanish missionaries.

Shortly after the Spanish conquest, the Mayan languages began to be written with Latin letters. Colonial-era literature in Mayan languages include the famous Popol Vuh, a mythico-historical narrative written in 17th century Classical Quiché but believed to be based on an earlier work written in the 1550s, now lost. The Título de Totonicapán and the 17th century theatrical work the Rabinal Achí are other notable early works in Kʼicheʼ, the latter in the Achí dialect. (Note: See Edmonson (1985) for a thorough treatment of colonial Quiché literature.) The Annals of the Cakchiquels from the late 16th century, which provides a historical narrative of the Kaqchikel, contains elements paralleling some of the accounts appearing in the Popol Vuh. The historical and prophetical accounts in the several variations known collectively as the books of Chilam Balam are primary sources of early Yucatec Maya traditions. (Note: Read Edmonson & Bricker (1985) for a thorough treatment of colonial Yucatec literature.) The only surviving book of early lyric poetry, the Songs of Dzitbalche by Ah Bam, comes from this same period.

In addition to these singular works, many early grammars of indigenous languages, called "artes", were written by priests and friars. Languages covered by these early grammars include Kaqchikel, Classical Quiché, Tzeltal, Tzotzil and Yucatec. Some of these came with indigenous-language translations of the Catholic catechism.

While Mayan peoples continued to produce a rich oral literature in the postcolonial period (after 1821), very little written literature was produced in this period. (Note: See Gossen (1985) for examples of the Tzotzil tradition of oral literature.)

Because indigenous languages were excluded from the education systems of Mexico and Guatemala after independence, Mayan peoples remained largely illiterate in their native languages, learning to read and write in Spanish, if at all. However, since the establishment of the Cordemex and the Guatemalan Academy of Mayan Languages (1986), native language literacy has begun to spread and a number of indigenous writers have started a new tradition of writing in Mayan languages. Notable among this new generation is the Kʼicheʼ poet Humberto Ak'abal, whose works are often published in dual-language Spanish/Kʼicheʼ editions, as well as Kʼicheʼ scholar Luis Enrique Sam Colop (1955–2011) whose translations of the Popol Vuh into both Spanish and modern Kʼicheʼ achieved high acclaim.

== See also ==
- Mayan Sign Language
- Cauque Mayan (mixed language)
