= Proto-Mayan language =

Hypothetical ancient Mesoamerican language

Proto-Mayan
- Reconstruction of: Mayan languages
- Region: Mesoamerica

Proto-Mayan is the hypothetical common ancestor of the 30 living Mayan languages, as well as the Classic Maya language documented in the Maya inscriptions. While there has been some controversy with Mayan subgrouping, there has been a general agreement that the following are the main five subgroups of the family: Huastecan, Yucatecan, Cholan-Tzeltalan, Kanjobalan-Chujean, and Quichean-Mamean.

Genealogy of Mayan languages.

== Phonology ==
The Proto-Mayan language is reconstructed (Campbell and Kaufman 1985) as having the following phonemes:

=== Vowels ===
Vowels
	Front	Central	Back
Close	i [i] ii [iː]		u [u] uu [uː]
Mid	e [e] ee [eː]		o [o] oo [oː]
Open		a [a] aa [aː]	

It is unlikely the language had a tonal system.

=== Consonants ===
Consonants
	Bilabial		Alveolar		Palatal		Velar		Uvular		Glottal
	plain	implosive	plain	ejective	plain	ejective	plain	ejective	plain	ejective	plain
Stop	p [p]	bʼ [ɓ]	t [t]	tʼ [tʼ]	ty [tʲ]	tyʼ [tʲʼ]	k [k]	kʼ [kʼ]	q [q]	qʼ [qʼ]	ʼ [ʔ]
Affricate			ts [tsʰ]	tsʼ [tsʼ]	ch [tʃʰ]	chʼ [tʃʼ]					
Fricative			s [s]		x [ʃ]				j [χ]		h [h]
Nasal	m [m]		n [n]				nh [ŋ]				
Liquid			l [l] r [r]								
Glide					y [j]		w [w]				

=== Sound rules ===
The following set of sound changes from proto-Mayan to the modern languages are used as the basis of the classification of the Mayan languages. Each sound change may be shared by a number of languages; a grey background indicates no change.

Overview of soundrules from Proto-Mayan to modern Mayan language groups
Huastecan	Yucatecan	Cholan–Tzeltalan		Qʼanjobʼalan–Chujean		Kʼichean–Mamean			
Huastecan	Yucatecan	Chʼolan	Tzeltalan	Qʼanjobʼalan	Chujean	Kʼichean		Mamean	
Huastecan	Yucatecan	Chʼolan	Tzeltalan	Qʼanjobʼalan	Chujean	Core Kʼicheʼ	Kaqchikel- Tzʼutujil	Mam	Ixil
*w > b									
*h > w/_o,u									
*q > k, *qʼ > kʼ									
*ŋ > h	*ŋ > n					*ŋ > x			
*ty > tʃ, *tyʼ > tʃʼ		*ty > ty/t, *tyʼ > tyʼ/tʼ		*ty > t, *tyʼ > tʼ		*ty > tʃ, *tyʼ > tʃʼ		*ty > tz, *tyʼ > tzʼ	
		*e: > i, *o: > u							
	*a: > ɨ								
	*-t > -tʃ							*t > tʃ	
		*-h > -j					*-h > -j		
						CVʔVC > CVʔC			
								*r > t	
								*r > j	
								*tʃ > tʂ	
							*-ɓ > -ʔ/VCV_#		

=== Developments ===
The palatalized plosives [tʲʼ] and [tʲ] have not been retained in most of the modern languages, a notable exception being the Ch'ol language. Instead they are reflected differently in different branches allowing a reconstruction of these phonemes as palatalized plosives. In the western branch (Chujean–Qʼanjobʼalan and Cholan) they are reflected as [t] and [tʼ]. In Mamean they are reflected as [ts] and [tsʼ] and in Yukatek and Kʼichean as [tʃʰ] and [tʃʼ].

reflexes of Proto-Mayan [tʲʼ] and [tʲ]
Proto-Mayan	Qʼanjobʼal	Mam	Kʼicheʼ	English
*tʲeːʔ	teʔ	tseʔ	tʃeːʔ	tree
*tʲaʔŋ	tan	tsaʔχ	tʃaːχ	ashes

The Proto-Mayan liquid [r] is reflected as [j] in the western languages (Chujean–Qʼanjobʼalan and Cholan), Huastecan and Yukatek but as [tʃʰ] in Mamean and [r] in Kʼichean and Poqom.

reflexes of Proto-Mayan [r]
Proto-Mayan	Yukatek	Ixil	Kʼicheʼ	English
*raʔʃ	jaʔʃ	tʃaʔʃ	raʃ	green
*kar	kaj	tʃaj	kar	fish

Proto-Mayan velar nasal *[ŋ] is reflected as [x] in the eastern branches (Kʼichean–Mamean), as [n] in Qʼanjobʼalan, Cholan and Yukatekan, and only conserved as [ŋ] in Chuj and Poptí. In Huastecan *[ŋ] is reflected as [h].

reflexes of Proto-Mayan [ŋ]
Proto-Mayan	Qʼanjobʼal	Ixil	Poptiʼ	English
*ŋeːh	ne	xeh	ŋeh	tail

The changes of Proto-Mayan glottal fricative [h] are many and it has different reflexes according to position. In some positions it has added length to the preceding vowel in languages that preserve a length distinction. In other languages it has the reflexes [w], [j], [ʔ], [x] or a zero-reflex.

Only Kʼichean–Mamean and some Qʼanjobʼalan languages have retained Proto-Mayan uvular stops [q] and [qʼ] whereas all other branches have changed these into [k] and [kʼ] respectively.

In Mamean a chain shift took place changing *[r] into [t], *[t] into [tʃ], *[tʃ] into [tʂ] and *[ʃ] into [ʂ]. These retroflex affricates and fricatives later diffused into Qʼanjobʼalan.

In polysyllabic words Kaqchikel and Tzʼutujil have changed a final Proto-Mayan *[w] and *[ɓ] into [j] and *[ʔ] respectively.

Huastecan is the only branch to have changed Proto-Mayan *[w] into [b]. Wastek also is the only Mayan language to have a phonemic labialized velar phoneme [kʷ], but this is known to be a postcolonial development. Comparing colonial documents in Wastek to modern Wastek it can be seen that they were originally clusters of [k] and a rounded vowel followed by a glide. For example, the word for "vulture" which in modern Wastek is pronounced [kʷiːʃ] was written <cuyx> in colonial Wastek and pronounced [kuwiːʃ].

The Yucatecan languages have all shifted Proto-Mayan *[t] into [tʃ] in wordfinal position.

Several languages particularly Cholan and Yucatecan have changed short [a] into [ɨ].

All Cholan languages have changed long proto-Mayan vowels [eː] and [oː] into [i] and [u] respectively.

Vowel length distinction has been lost in Qʼanjobʼalan-Chujean (except for Mochoʼ and Akateko), Kaqchikel and Cholan. Some languages have reduced the vowel length distinction into a tense lax distinction that was later lost for most vowels, Kaqchikel however retains a centralized lax schwa-like vowel as a reflex of Proto-Mayan [a]. Two languages, Yukatek and Uspantek and one dialect of Tzotzil have introduced a tone distinction in vowels between high and low tones as reflexes of former vowel length and [h] and [ʔ].

== Sources ==
- England, Nora C., 1994, Autonomia de los Idiomas Mayas: Historia e identidad. (Ukutaʼmil Ramaqʼiil Utzijobʼaal ri Mayaʼ Amaaqʼ.) Cholsamaj. Guatemala.
- Handbook of Middle American Indians, 1967, 1969, R. Wauchope (series ed.). Vol 7 (ethnographic sketches of Mayan groups), Volume 5 (linguistic sketches and other useful materials). F 1434, H 3, LAC (ref).
- Lyle Campbell and Terrence Kaufman, Annual Review of Anthropology. 1985. "Mayan Linguistics: Where are We Now?"
