= 2nd federal electoral district of Puebla =

Federal electoral district of Mexico

Puebla's 2nd
- Electoral district of the Chamber of Deputies of Mexico

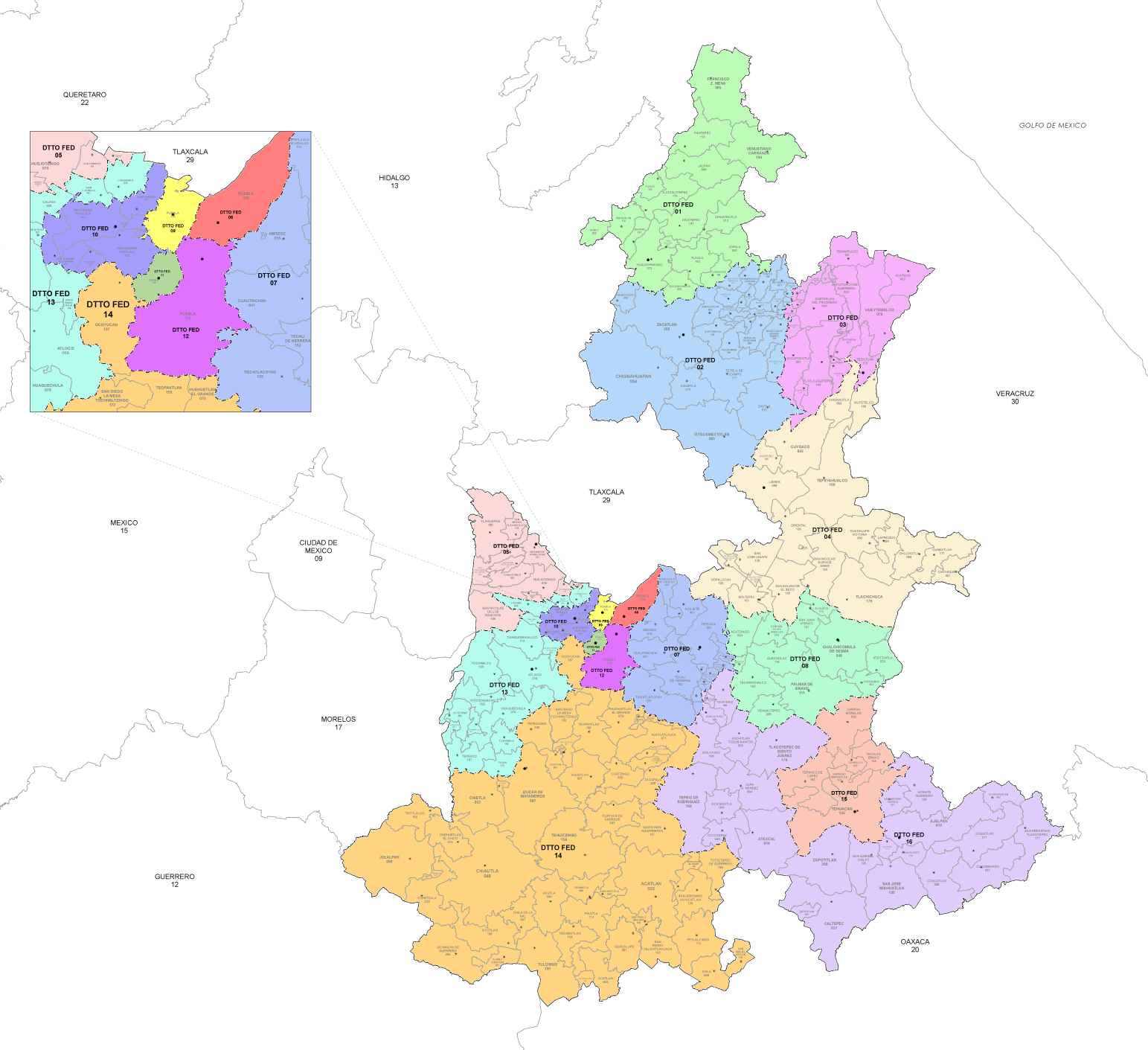
- 2nd district since 2023

Incumbent
- Member: Fátima Cruz Peláez
- Party: ▌Ecologist Green Party
- Congress: 66th (2024–2027)

District
- State: Puebla
- Head town: Cuautilulco Barrio, Zacatlán
- Coordinates: 19°56′N 97°57′W
- Covers: 27 municipalities: Ahuacatlán, Ahuazotepec, Amixtlán, Aquixtla, Atlequizayan, Camocuautla, Caxhuacan, Chignahuapan, Coatepec, Cuautempan, Hermenegildo Galeana, Huehuetla, Hueytlalpan, Huitzilan de Serdan, Ixtacamaxtitlán, Ixtepec, Olintla, San Felipe Tepatlán, Tepango, Tepetzintla, Tetela de Ocampo, Xochiapulco, Xochitlán de Vicente Suárez, Zacatlán, Zapotitlán de Méndez, Zautla, Zongozotla
- PR region: Fourth
- Precincts: 192
- Population: 396,558 (2020 census)
- Indigenous: Yes (59%)

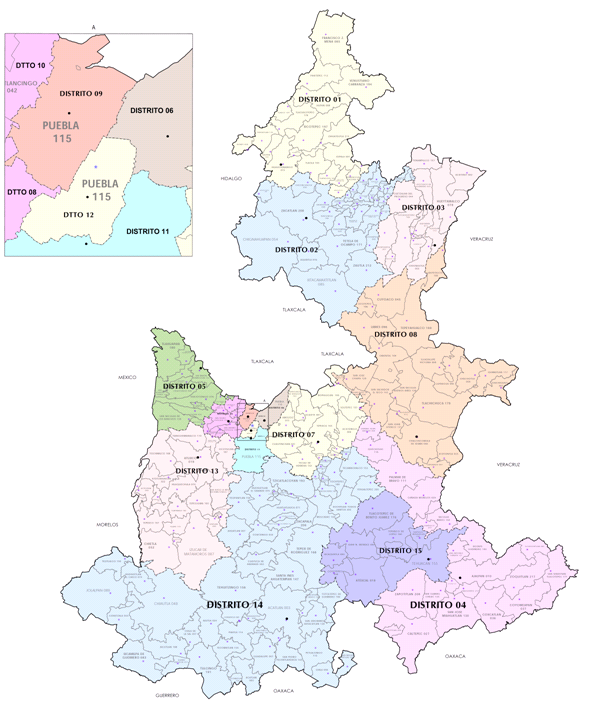
Puebla's districts in 2017–2022

The 2nd federal electoral district of Puebla (Spanish: Distrito electoral federal 02 de Puebla) is one of the 300 electoral districts into which Mexico is divided for elections to the federal Chamber of Deputies and one of 16 such districts in the state of Puebla.

It elects one deputy to the lower house of Congress for each three-year legislative session by means of the first-past-the-post system. Votes cast in the district also count towards the calculation of proportional representation ("plurinominal") deputies elected from the fourth region.

The current member for the district, re-elected in the 2024 general election, is Fátima Almendra Cruz Peláez of the Ecologist Green Party of Mexico (PVEM).

== District territory ==
Under the 2023 districting plan adopted by the National Electoral Institute (INE), which is to be used for the 2024, 2027 and 2030 federal elections, Puebla's congressional seat allocation rose from 15 to 16. The 2nd district is in Puebla's Sierra Norte region and covers 192 electoral precincts (secciones electorales) across 27 of the state's municipalities:

- Ahuacatlán, Ahuazotepec, Amixtlán, Aquixtla, Atlequizayan, Camocuautla, Caxhuacan, Chignahuapan, Coatepec, Cuautempan, Hermenegildo Galeana, Huehuetla, Hueytlalpan, Huitzilan de Serdan, Ixtacamaxtitlán, Ixtepec, Olintla, San Felipe Tepatlán, Tepango, Tepetzintla, Tetela de Ocampo, Xochiapulco, Xochitlán de Vicente Suárez, Zacatlán, Zapotitlán de Méndez, Zautla and Zongozotla.

The head town (cabecera distrital), where results from individual polling stations are gathered together and tallied, is the Cuautilulco neighbourhood of the city of Zacatlán. The district reported a population of 396,558 in the 2020 census and, with Indigenous and Afrodescendent inhabitants accounting for over 59% of that total, it is classified by the INE as an indigenous district. (Note: Total inhabitants, not voters. The INE deems any local or federal electoral district where Indigenous or Afrodescendent inhabitants number 40% or more of the population to be an indigenous district.)

== Previous districting schemes ==
Evolution of electoral district numbers
	1974	1978	1996	2005	2017	2023
Puebla	10	14	15	16	15	16
Chamber of Deputies	196	300				

2017–2022

From 2017 to 2022, when Puebla was assigned 15 congressional seats, the 1st district's head town was in Zacatlán's Cuautilulco neighbourhood and it covered 29 municipalities.

2005–2017

Under the 2005 plan, the district was one of 16 in Puebla. Its head town was at Zacatlán and it covered 16 municipalities.

1996–2005

Between 1996 and 2005, Puebla had 15 districts. The 2nd covered 29 municipalities, with its head town at Zacatlán.

1978–1996

The districting scheme in force from 1978 to 1996 was the result of the 1977 electoral reforms, which increased the number of single-member seats in the Chamber of Deputies from 196 to 300. Under that plan, Puebla's seat allocation rose from 10 to 14. The district's head town was the state capital, Puebla, and it covered parts of the city and of its surrounding municipality.

== Deputies returned to Congress ==
(Mexico) National parties
- Current
- PAN
- PRI
- PT
- PVEM
- MC
- Morena
- PAZ
- Somos
- Defunct or local only
- PLM
- PNR
- PRM
- PNM
- PP
- PPS
- PARM
- PFCRN
- CON
- PANAL
- PSD
- PES
- PES
- PRD

Puebla's 2nd district
Election	Deputy	Party	Term	Legislature
1916	Rafael Cañete		1916–1917	Constituent Congress of Querétaro
...
1973	Alejandro Cañedo Benítez	National Action Party (Mexico)	1973–1976	49th Congress
1976	Jorge Efrén Domínguez Ramírez	Institutional Revolutionary Party	1976–1979	50th Congress
1979	Victoriano Valentín Álvarez García	Institutional Revolutionary Party	1979–1982	51st Congress
1982	Guillermo Pacheco Pulido	Institutional Revolutionary Party	1982–1985	52nd Congress
1985	Amado Llaguno Mayaudón	Institutional Revolutionary Party	1985–1988	53rd Congress
1988	Carlos Enrique Grajales Salas	Institutional Revolutionary Party	1988–1991	54th Congress
1991	Rafael Cañedo Benítez	Institutional Revolutionary Party	1991–1994	55th Congress
1994	María Lucero Saldaña Pérez	Institutional Revolutionary Party	1994–1997	56th Congress
1997	Miguel Ángel Quiroz Pérez	Institutional Revolutionary Party	1997–2000	57th Congress
2000	Cutberto Cantorán Espinosa	Institutional Revolutionary Party	2000–2003	58th Congress
2003	José Guillermo Aréchiga Santamaría	Institutional Revolutionary Party	2003–2006	59th Congress
2006	María Esther Jiménez Ramos	National Action Party (Mexico)	2006–2009	60th Congress
2009	Juan Carlos Lastiri Quirós	Institutional Revolutionary Party	2009–2012	61st Congress
2012	José Luis Márquez Martínez	Institutional Revolutionary Party	2012–2015	62nd Congress
2015	José Lorenzo Rivera Sosa (Note: Rivera Sosa resigned his seat on 20 February 2018 and was replaced for the remainder of his term by his alternate, Soto Enríquez.); Leobardo Soto Enríquez	Institutional Revolutionary Party	2015–2018	63rd Congress
2018	Maiella Gómez Maldonado (Note: Originally elected for the Citizens' Movement, Gómez Maldonado sat as an independent after 9 February 2021.)	Citizens' Movement (Mexico) Independent politician	2018–2021	64th Congress
2021	Fátima Almendra Cruz Peláez	Ecologist Green Party of Mexico	2021–2024	65th Congress
2024	Fátima Almendra Cruz Peláez	Ecologist Green Party of Mexico	2024–2027	66th Congress

== Presidential elections ==
Puebla's 2nd district
Election	District won by	Party or coalition	%
2018	Andrés Manuel López Obrador	Juntos Haremos Historia	38.7558
2024	Claudia Sheinbaum Pardo	Sigamos Haciendo Historia	63.0309
