= Municipalities of Totonacapan =

Totonacapan is defined by the following municipalities in the states of Veracruz, Puebla, and Hidalgo (Valderrama Rouy 2005:188-189).

== Veracruz ==
There is a total of 17 municipalities in the part of Veracruz comprising the Totonacapan region.

INEGI code	Municipality	Municipal Seat	Speakers of Totonac
031	Castillo de Teayo	Castillo de Teayo	No
033	Cazones	Cazones de Herrera	Yes
047	Coahuitlan	Progreso de Zaragoza	Yes
050	Coatzintla	Coatzintla	Yes
060	Coxquihui	Coxquihui	Yes
061	Coyutla	Coyutla	Yes
066	Espinal, Veracruz	Espinal, Veracruz	Yes
067	Filomeno Mata	Filomeno Mata	Yes
069	Gutiérrez Zamora	Gutiérrez Zamora	Yes
107	Martínez de la Torre	Martínez de la Torre	No
108	Mecatlán	Mecatlán	Yes
130	Papantla	Papantla (de Olarte)	Yes
136	Poza Rica de Hidalgo	Poza Rica (de Hidalgo)	Yes
161	Tecolutla	Tecolutla	Yes
177	Tihuatlán	Tihuatlán	Yes
186	Tlapacoyan	Tlapacoyan	Yes
210	Zozocolco de Hidalgo	Zozocolco de Hidalgo	Yes

== Puebla ==
There is a total of 58 municipalities in the part of Puebla comprising the Totonacapan region.

INEGI code	Municipality	Municipal Seat	Speakers of Totonac
002	Acateno	San José Acateno	No
006	Ahuacatlán	Ahuacatlán	Yes
014	Amixtlan	Amixtlan	Yes
016	Aquixtla	Aquixtla	No
017	Atempan	Atempan	No
019	Atlequizayan	Atlequizayan	Yes
026	Ayotoxco de Guerrero	Ayotoxco de Guerrero	No
029	Camocuautla	Camocuautla	Yes
031	Caxhuacán	Caxhuacán	Yes
037	Chiconcuautla	Chiconcuautla	No
041	Chignautla	Chignautla	No
046	Coatepec	Coatepec	Yes
055	Cuautempan	San Esteban Cuautempan	No
059	Cuetzalán del Progreso	Cuetzalán	No
065	Francisco Z. Mena	Metlaltoyuca	Yes
068	Hermenegildo Galeana	Bienvenido	Yes
072	Huauchinango	Huauchinango	No
073	Huehuetla	Huehuetla	Yes
077	Hueyapan	Hueyapan	No
078	Hueytamalco	Hueytamalco	No
079	Hueytlalpan	Hueytlalpan	Yes
080	Huitzilan de Serdán	Huitzilan	Yes
084	Ixtacamaxtitlán	Ixtacamaxtitlán	No
085	Ixtepec	Ixtepec	Yes
087	Jalpan	Jalpan	No
???	Jonotla	Jonotla	No
090	Jopala	Jopala	Yes
092	Juan Galindo	Nuevo Necaxa	No
101	Naupan	Naupan	No
102	Nauzontla	Nauzontla	No
108	Olintla	Olintla	Yes
110	Pahuatlán	Pahuatlán de Valle	No
112	Pantepec	Pantepec	Yes
169	Tepetlán	Tepetlán	Yes
157	Tenampulco	Tenampulco	No
161	Tepango de Rodríguez	Tepango de Rodríguez	Yes
166	Tepetzintla	Tepetzintla	Yes
171	Tetela de Ocampo	Tetela de Ocampo	No
172	Teteles de Ávila Castillo	Teteles de Ávila Castillo	No
173	Teziutlán	Teziutlán	No
178	Tlacuilotepec	Tlacuilotepec	Yes
182	Tlaola	Tlaola	No
183	Tlapacoya	Tlapacoya	No
185	Tlatlauquitepec	Tlatlauquitepec	Yes
191	Tuzamapán de Galeana	Tuzamapán de Galeana	Yes
193	Venustiano Carranza	Venustiano Carranza	Yes
196	Xicotepec	Xicotepec de Juárez	Yes
199	Xochiapulco	Cinco de Mayo	No
201	Xochitlán de Vicente Suárez	Xochitlán de Romero Rubio	No
203	Yaonahuac	Yaonahuac	No
206	Zacapoaxtla	Zacapoaxtla	No
207	Zacatlán	Zacatlán	No
209	Zapotitlán de Méndez	Zapotitlán de Méndez	Yes
210	Zaragoza	Zaragoza	No
211	Zautla	Santiago Zautla	No
212	Zihuateutla	Zihuateutla	Yes
214	Zongozotla	Zongozotla	Yes
215	Zoquiapan	Zoquiapan	No

== Hidalgo ==
There is a total of 1 municipality in the part of Hidalgo comprising the Totonacapan region.

INEGI code	Municipality	Municipal Seat	Speakers of Totonac
02	Acaxochitlán	Acaxochitlán	No

== See also ==
- Totonac
- Totonac language
