= Zacatlán (municipality) =

Coordinates: 19.9333°N 97.9606°W

- Municipality
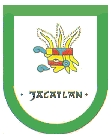
- Coat of arms
- Interactive map of Zacatlán
- Country: Mexico
- State: Puebla
- Seat: Zacatlán

Population (2020)
  - Total: 87,361
- Time zone: UTC-6 (Zona Centro)

Zacatlán is a municipality in the Mexican state of Puebla. Its administrative centre is the city of Zacatlán.

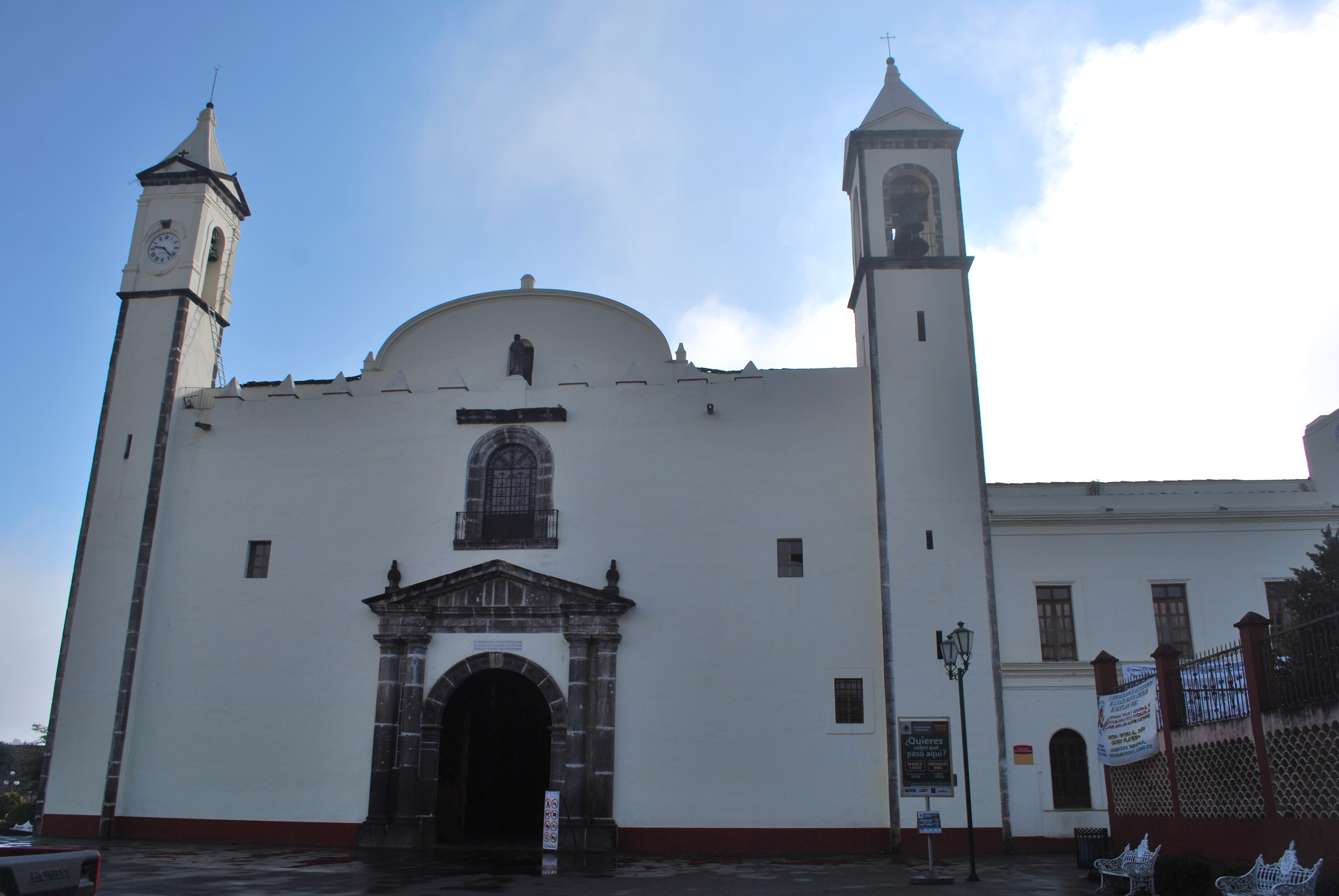
Colonial era Franciscan monastery.

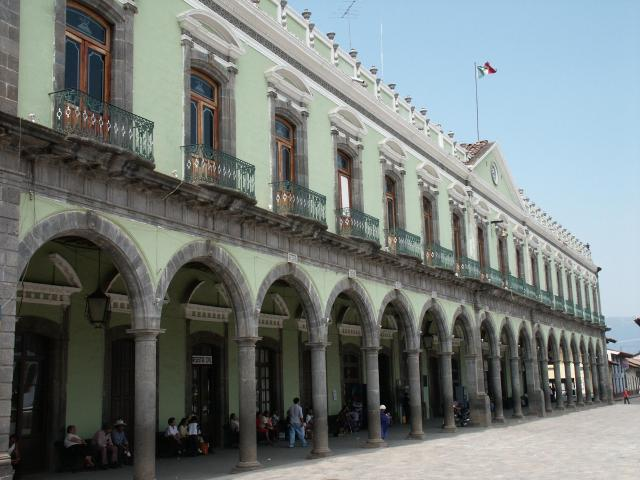
Municipal palace of Zacatlán.

== The municipality ==
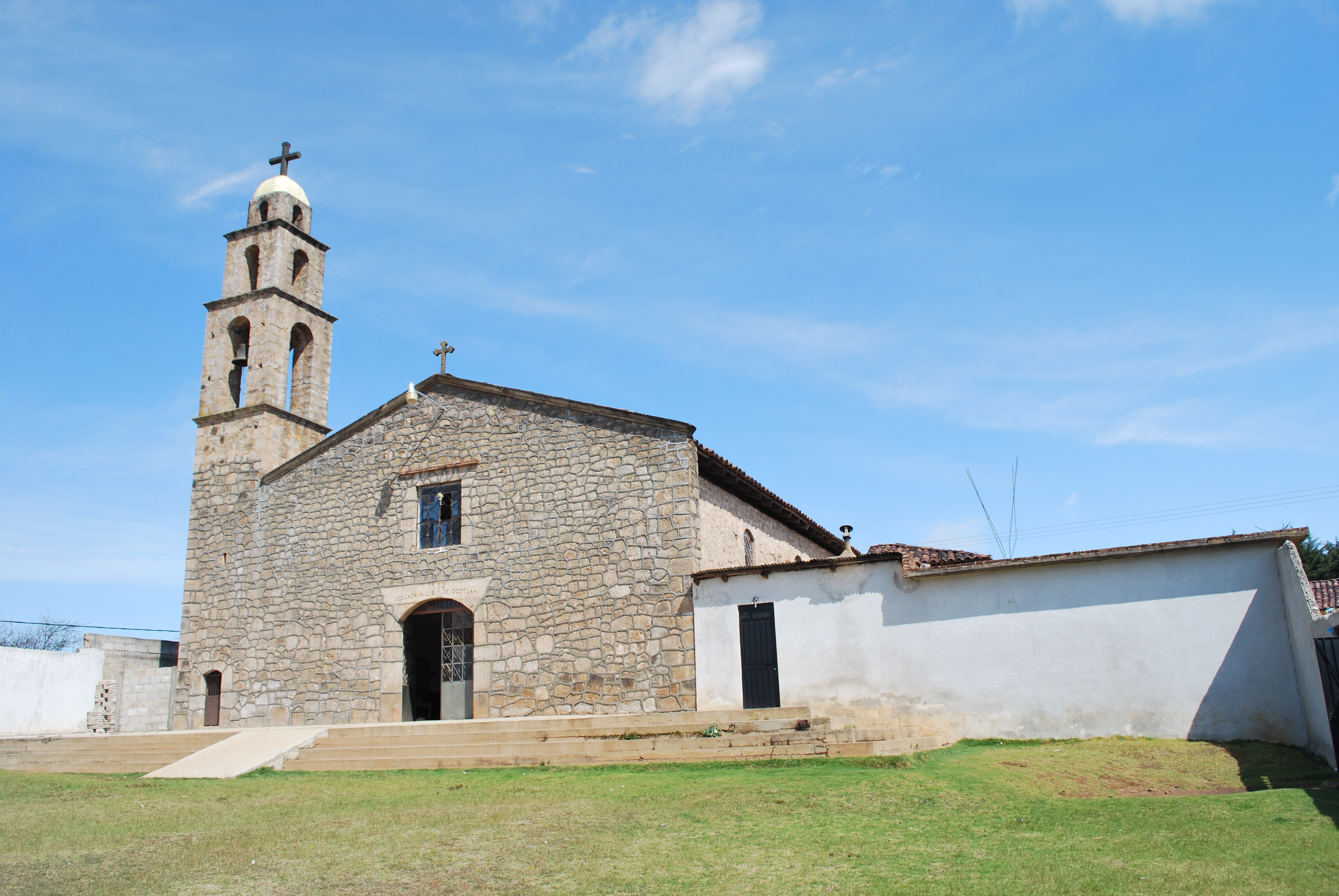
Parish church in Camotepec

The city of Zacatlán is the seat of government for itself and other communities, forming a municipality which covers 512.82 km^{2} (198.00 sq mi). This municipality borders the municipalities of Chiconcuautla, Huauchinango, Aquixtla, Chignahuapan, Ahuacatlán, Tepetzintla, Tetela de Ocampo and Ahuazotepec with the state of Hidalgo to the west. The municipal government is formed by a municipal president, an officer called a síndico, and eight representatives called regidors. It has commissions related to governing, taxes, health, education, industry and commerce, public works, environment and agriculture.

The population of the municipality has grown from 62,788 in 1995 to 76,296 in 2010. About ninety percent of the population is Catholic with the rest Protestant or Evangelist. The main indigenous ethnicities in the area are Nahua and Totonac, with 7,450 people who spoke an indigenous language as of 2005. Most of the indigenous population lives outside of the city of Zacatlán, especially in San Miguel Tenango. Nahuatl is the dominant indigenous language, locally called Mehcanohtlahtol. It is estimated that there are nearly 17,000 Nahuatl speakers in Zacatlán and the neighboring municipalities of Ahuacatlán and Tepetzintla. The Nahuatl dialect spoken here is closest to that spoken in Zacapoaxtla and Huauchinango.

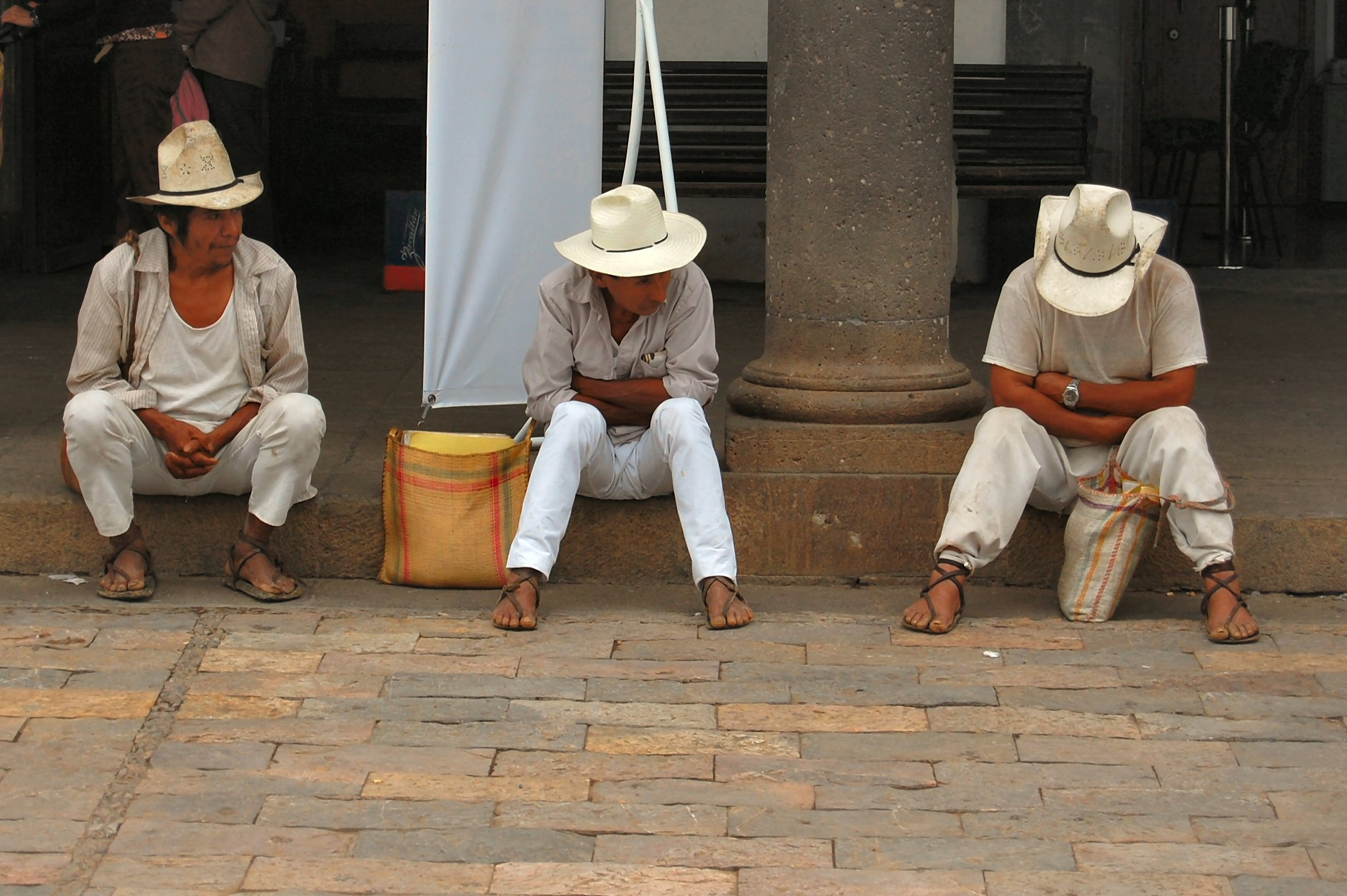
Nahua men in the municipality

Traditional dress for women includes short sleeved blouses with embroidery around the neck (tlahmach cmaisahtli), a white poncho called a quezquémetl, also embroidered and a black skirt or wrap with stripes (ilpicatl), which is often accompanies by large numbers of necklaces, ribbons in the hair, blue huarache sandals, large earrings and sometimes with a wrap for carrying small children. For men, it consists of pants and shirt of undyed cotton, a hat of palm fronds, huaraches and a black or brown wool overcoat. Variations in the clothing style and embroidery generally indicates the wearers' origin.

Traditional dishes in the municipality include "pinchón del campesino" mixote made with chicken, rabbit or beef, sopes, chalupas, tlacoyos and eggs with chili pepper. Traditional drinks include hard apple cider and other fruit wines.

The municipality has 178 education centers from preschool to high school along with vocational training sites. There are 61 preschools, 69 primary schools, 37 middle schools, eight high schools/vocational school and two adult education centers. There are also thirteen bilingual/bicultural schools at the primary school level. There is also a technological college called the Instituto Tecnológico Superior de la Sierra Norte de Puebla.

Federal Highway 119 passes through the municipality connecting the set with Ahuazotepec, Huauchinango, Juan Galindo, Xicotepec, Jalpan, Venustiano Carranza onto the cities of Poza Rica and Tlaxcala. A smaller highway connects the seat with Zacapoaxtla. There is bus service to Tlaxcala, Tulancingo and Mexico City.

Major towns or settlements located close to the city (and municipal seat) of Zacatlán include Atzingo (estimated population around 2,600), Jicolapa (population 1,500), San Pedro Atmatla (population 1,500), Tlatempa (population 1,700), and Tomatlán (population 1,700). In order of increasing distance from Zacatlán are the towns or settlements of Xoxoonacatla (population 1,700), Xilotzingo (population 1,200), San Miguel Tenango (population 1,350), and Tepeixco (population 1,300) with the town of Camotepec located near the Piedras Encimadas Valley with a population of about 1,800. Agriculture and livestock are the dominant economic activities across all population centers within the municipality, however the economy of the city Zacatlán is more diversified, and is noted for Relojes Centenario, the first clock factory located in Latin America.

The Zacatlán municipality is particularly noted for its production of apples which have been grown in the area since 1600, with the city of Zacatlán surrounded by orchards containing an estimated 700,000 apple trees. Other soft fruits and nuts grown include plums (with an estimated 300,000 trees), peaches, pears (150,000 trees) and also walnuts. Livestock mostly consists of cattle and sheep for wool, with some mules and domestic fowl, while fishing and fish farming are also important economic activities, especially in the towns of Xoxanacatla and Tepeixco which produce trout and carp. There is also some beekeeping as well.

== Features ==
1. Colonial Franciscan monastery
2. Municipal palace on Zacatlán Plaza
3. Zacatlán Clock Museum; and Centenario and Ricaño clockmakers.
4. The Parque Valle de las Piedras Encimadas (Valley of the Stacked Stones Natural Park) — located near Zacatlán, .
