= Huehuetla, Puebla =

Huehuetla
- Municipality
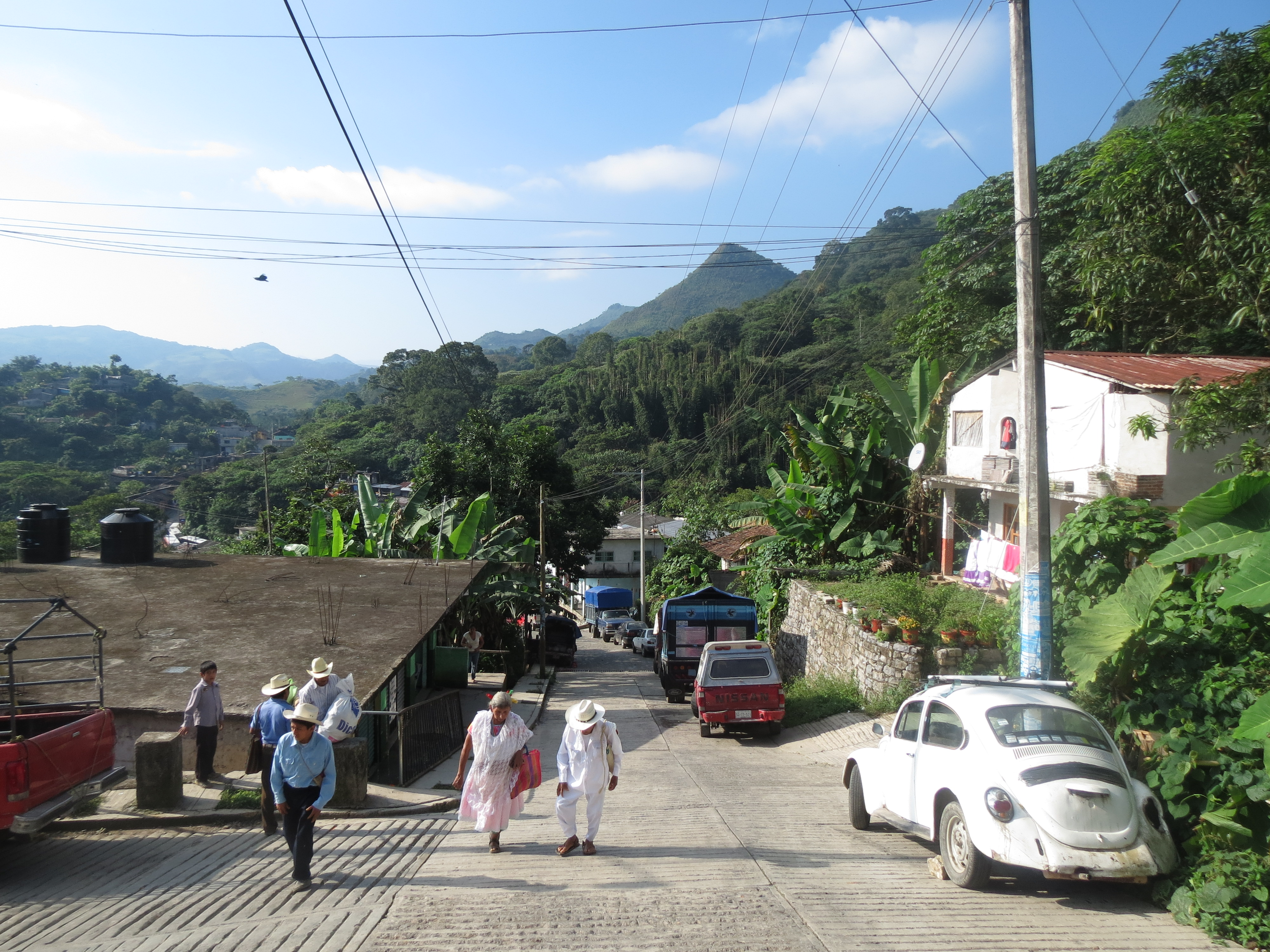
- The town and municipal seat of Huehuetla

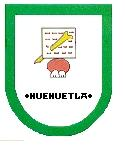
- Coat of arms

- Location in Puebla

- Location in Mexico
- Coordinates: 20°06′27″N 97°37′24″W
- Country: Mexico
- State: Puebla
- Established: 1895
- Seat: Huehuetla

Government
  - President: Ruben Vázquez Cabrera

Area
  - Total: 48 km^{2} (19 sq mi)
- Elevation (of seat): 562 m (1,844 ft)

Population (2010 Census)
  - Total: 15,689
  - Estimate (2015 Intercensal Survey): 18,803
  - Density: 330/km^{2} (850/sq mi)
  - Seat: 1,764
- Time zone: UTC-6 (Zona Centro)
- Postal code of seat: 73470
- Area code: 233

Huehuetla (Nahuatl: "old place") is a rural municipality in Puebla, Mexico.

== Geography ==
Huehuetla is located in northern Puebla on its border with Veracruz. The southern exclave of San Juan Ocelonacaxtla is separated from the rest of the municipality by Caxhuacan and Ixtepec. The main part of the municipality also borders Olintla and Hueytlalpan in the west and the Veracruzian municipalities of Coxquihui and Zozocolco de Hidalgo in the east. San Juan Ocelonacaxtla additionally borders the Pueblan municipalities of Tuzamapan de Galeana, Jonotla, Zoquiapan and Atlequizayan. Huehuetla covers an area of 48 square kilometres (19 sq mi).

Situated in the Sierra Norte de Puebla, Huehuetla's topography is quite rugged, with hills topping 800 metres (2,600 ft) above sea level descending to river valleys less than 300 metres (980 ft) above sea level. The municipality is located in the Tecolutla River basin. The main river in the municipality is the Tehuancate, which flows through it from west to east. The Tehuancate drains into the Zempoala River, which also forms the southeastern boundary of the Ocelonacaxtla exclave. Over half of the land in the municipality is used for agriculture, although the soils in the municipality are leptosols and poorly suited for agriculture.

Huehuetla is located in a climatic transition zone between the temperate Sierra Norte and the hot Gulf of Mexico coast. Rain occurs throughout the year. Average temperatures range between 18 and 24 degrees Celsius and average annual precipitation is between 2900 and 3600 millimetres.

== History ==
In Pre-Hispanic times, Huehuetla was inhabited by Nahua and Totonac peoples. Spanish settlement of the area began in 1550: property titles were first given to settlers in 1574, in which the area was named San Salvador Huehuetla. Previously part of the district of Zacatlán, Huehuetla was established as a free municipality in 1895.

== Administration ==
The municipal government comprises one councillor (Spanish: síndico) and eight trustees (regidores), six of whom are elected by relative majority and two by proportional representation, headed by a president. The current president of the municipality is Ruben Vázquez Cabrera. San Juan Ocelonacaxtla elects an auxiliary board (junta auxiliar) whose functions are subject to the municipal authorities.

== Demographics ==
In the 2010 Mexican Census, the municipality of Huehuetla recorded a population of 15,689 inhabitants living in 3361 households. It recorded a population of 18,803 inhabitants in the 2015 Intercensal Survey.

There are 14 localities in the municipality, of which only the municipal seat, also called Huehuetla, is classified as urban. It recorded a population of 1764 inhabitants in the 2010 Census. The Ozelonacaxtla exclave, located 12 kilometres (7.5 mi) south of the municipal seat, recorded a population of 1326 inhabitants in the 2010 Census.

== Culture ==
Huehuetla is located in the cultural region of Totonacapan. In the 2015 Intercensal Survey, 97.68% of people in the municipality identified themselves as indigenous. In the 2010 Census, 12,904 people or 82% of the population in Huehuetla reported speaking an indigenous language, of which 12,187 spoke Totonac. In the 2015 Intercensal Survey, 29.52% of the people reported speaking an indigenous language did not speak Spanish. Sociolinguistic fieldwork done in Ozelonacaxtla indicates that Totonac language vitality in that community remains high. The Independent Totonac Organization (Organización Independiente Totonaca, OIT) is an indigenous social movement founded in 1989 that has played an influential role in promoting the revitalization of Totonac culture and advancing the interests of the Totonac people in the area.

== Economy ==
The main economic activity in Huehuetla is agriculture: main crops include coffee and corn. The gross domestic product of the municipality was unofficially estimated at 263.9 million Mexican pesos in 2010.
