= Ahuacatlán Municipality =

Ahuacatlán Municipality may refer to:

- Ahuacatlán Municipality, Nayarit, Mexico
- Ahuacatlán Municipality, Puebla, Mexico

== See also ==
- Ahuacatlán (disambiguation)
