= Huehuetla =

Huehuetla may refer to:

- the municipality of Huehuetla, Hidalgo, or its municipal seat of the same name
- the municipality of Huehuetla, Puebla, or its municipal seat of the same name
