= Ixtepec =

Ixtepec may refer to:

- Ixtepec, Oaxaca, a small city and municipality in Oaxaca, Mexico
  - Ixtepec railway station
- Ixtepec, Puebla, a municipality in Puebla, Mexico
