= Tepetzintla =

Tepetzintla may refer to:

- Tepetzintla, Puebla, a town and municipality in Puebla in south-eastern Mexico
- Tepetzintla, Veracruz, a municipality in the Mexican state of Veracruz
