= Juan Carlos Lastiri =

Mexican politician

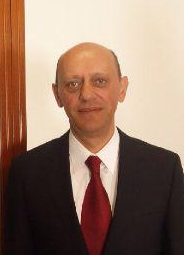
- Born: 21 December 1966 (age 59); Zacatlán, Puebla, Mexico
- Occupation: Politician
- Political party: PRI

Juan Carlos Lastiri Quirós (born 21 December 1966) is a Mexican politician from the Institutional Revolutionary Party (PRI). In the 2009 mid-terms he was elected to the Chamber of Deputies to represent Puebla's 2nd district during the 61st session of Congress (2009–2012).
