= José Luis Márquez Martínez =

Mexican politician

- Born: 21 June 1966 (age 59); Puebla, Mexico
- Occupation: Politician
- Political party: PRI

José Luis Márquez Martínez (born 21 June 1966) is a Mexican politician affiliated with the Institutional Revolutionary Party (PRI). In the 2012 general election he was elected to the Chamber of Deputies to represent Puebla's 2nd district during the 62nd session of Congress (2012–2015).
