= María Esther Jiménez Ramos =

Mexican politician

- Born: 20 November 1963 (age 62); Puebla, Mexico
- Occupation: Politician
- Political party: PAN

María Esther Jiménez Ramos (born 20 November 1963) is a Mexican politician affiliated with the National Action Party (PAN). In the 2006 general election she was elected to the Chamber of Deputies to represent Puebla's 2nd district during the 60th session of Congress.
