= Ahuacatlán =

Ahuacatlán may refer to:

- Ahuacatlán, Nayarit, a municipal seat in the Mexican state of Nayarit
- Ahuacatlán, Puebla, a municipal seat in the Mexican state of Puebla
- Ahuacatlán Municipality, Nayarit
- Ahuacatlán Municipality, Puebla
