= Rafael Cañedo Benítez =

Mexican politician

- Born: 1 January 1942; Puebla, Puebla, Mexico
- Died: 10 July 2001 (aged 59)
- Occupations: Businessman and politician
- Political party: PRI

Rafael Cañedo Benítez (1 January 1942 – 10 July 2001) was a Mexican businessman and politician affiliated with the Institutional Revolutionary Party (PRI). He served in the Senate during the 58th and (briefly) the 59th sessions of Congress representing Puebla, and in the Chamber of Deputies during the 55th session for Puebla's 2nd district.

He was the founder of Grupo HR, a group of radio stations in Puebla, that in 1988 got renamed to Grupo Acir Puebla.
