= María Lucero Saldaña =

Mexican politician

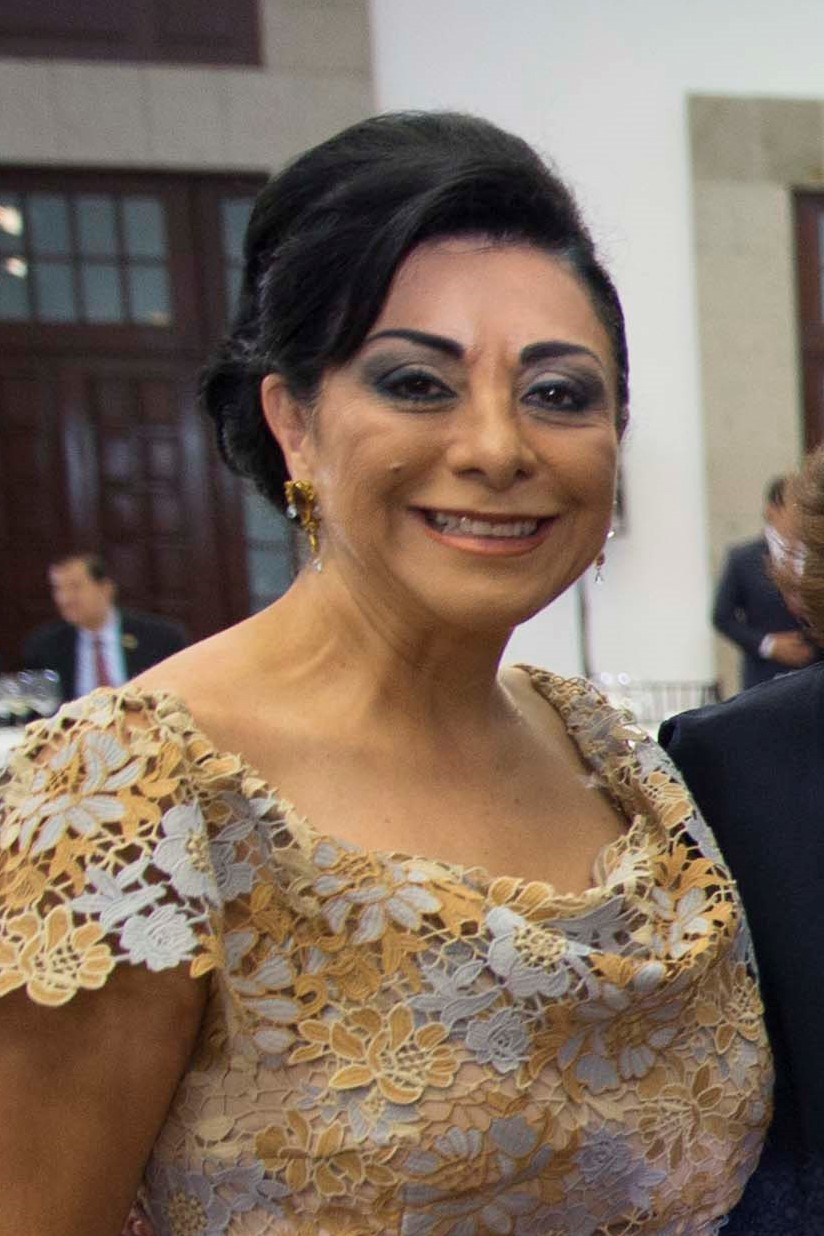
- Born: 18 January 1957 (age 69); Puebla, Puebla, Mexico
- Occupation: Politician
- Political party: PRI

María Lucero Saldaña Pérez (born 18 January 1957) is a Mexican politician affiliated with the Institutional Revolutionary Party (PRI). She served in the Senate during the 62nd Congress (2012–2015) representing Puebla. She also served in the Chamber of Deputies during two periods (1988–91; and 1994–97, for Puebla's 2nd district) and in the Senate between 2001 and 2006.
