= Cutberto Cantorán Espinosa =

Mexican politician

- Born: 20 March 1957 (age 69); Chiautla de Tapia, Puebla, Mexico
- Occupation: Politician
- Political party: PRI

Cutberto Cantorán Espinosa (born 20 March 1957) is a Mexican politician from the Institutional Revolutionary Party (PRI). In the 2000 general election he was elected to the Chamber of Deputies to represent Puebla's 2nd district during the 58th session of Congress.
