= Totonac =

Indigenous ethnic group of Mexico

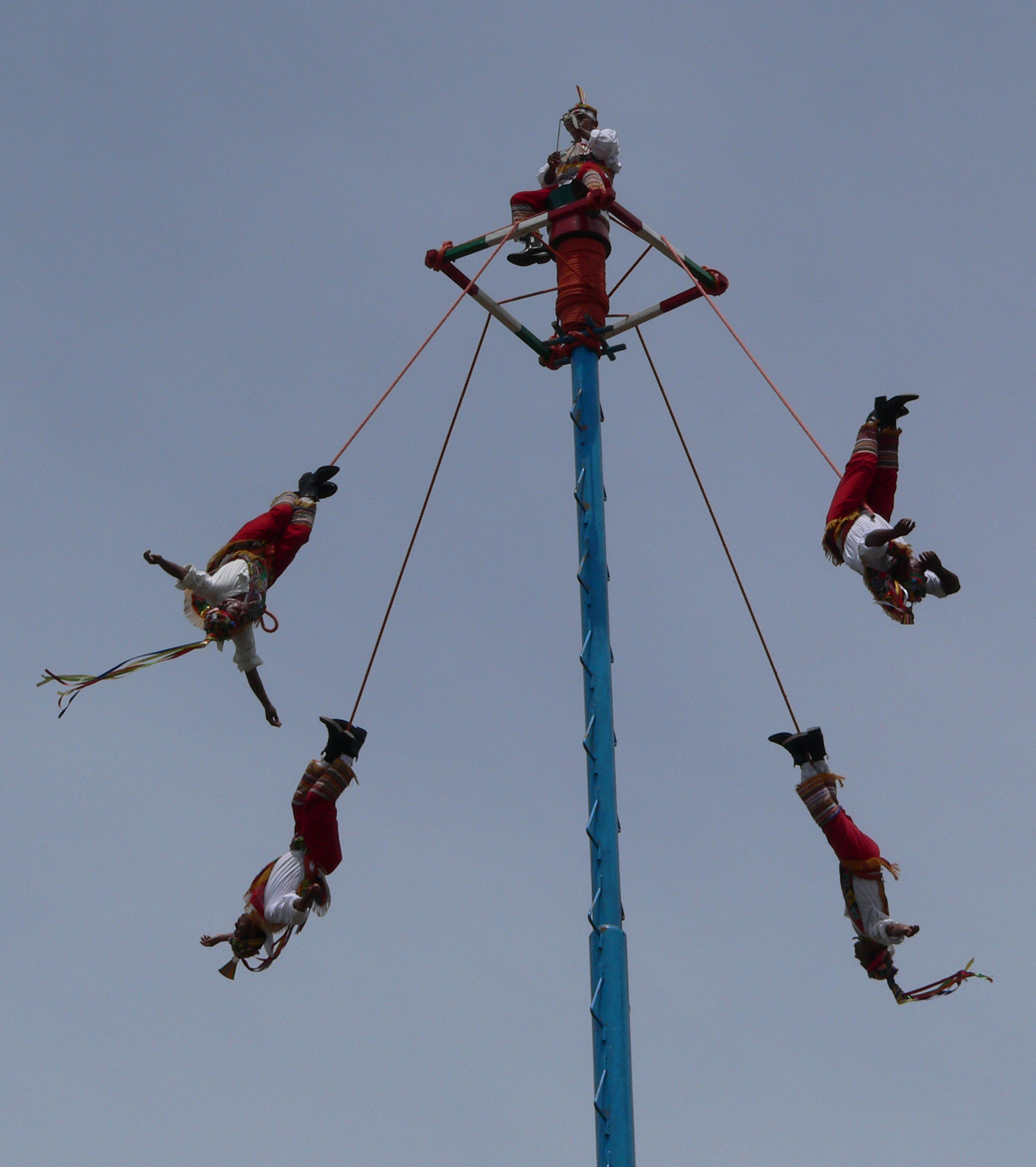
- Totonacs of Papantla, Veracruz performing the "voladores" ritual

Regions with significant populations
- Mexico (Veracruz, Puebla): 411,266

Languages
- Totonac languages, Spanish

Religion
- Indigenous Religion, Christianity

- People: Totonac
- Language: Totonac
- Country: Totonacapan

The Totonac are an Indigenous people of Mexico who reside in the states of Veracruz, Puebla, and Hidalgo. They are one of the possible builders of the pre-Columbian city of El Tajín, and further maintained quarters in Teotihuacán (a city which they claim to have built). Until the mid-19th century they were the world's main producers of vanilla. The Totonac people cultivated vanilla in Papantla, but faced competition when the French island of Réunion entered the market. This group of people also encountered conflicts over land ownership during the course of the 19th and early 20th centuries, as the privatization of communal land in Papantla became more of a concern to local elites.

== Etymology ==
The term "totonac" refers to the people living in Totonacapan. There is no agreement as to the origin of the term. Some authors have translated the term "totonac" as a Nahuatl word meaning "People of Hot Land". The translation for this word in the Totonac Language, according to sources, is "toto-nacu" meaning "three hearts" signifying their three cities or cultural centers: Cempoala, Tajin and Teayo. Evidence, however, is inconclusive.

== Geography and traditional lifestyle ==
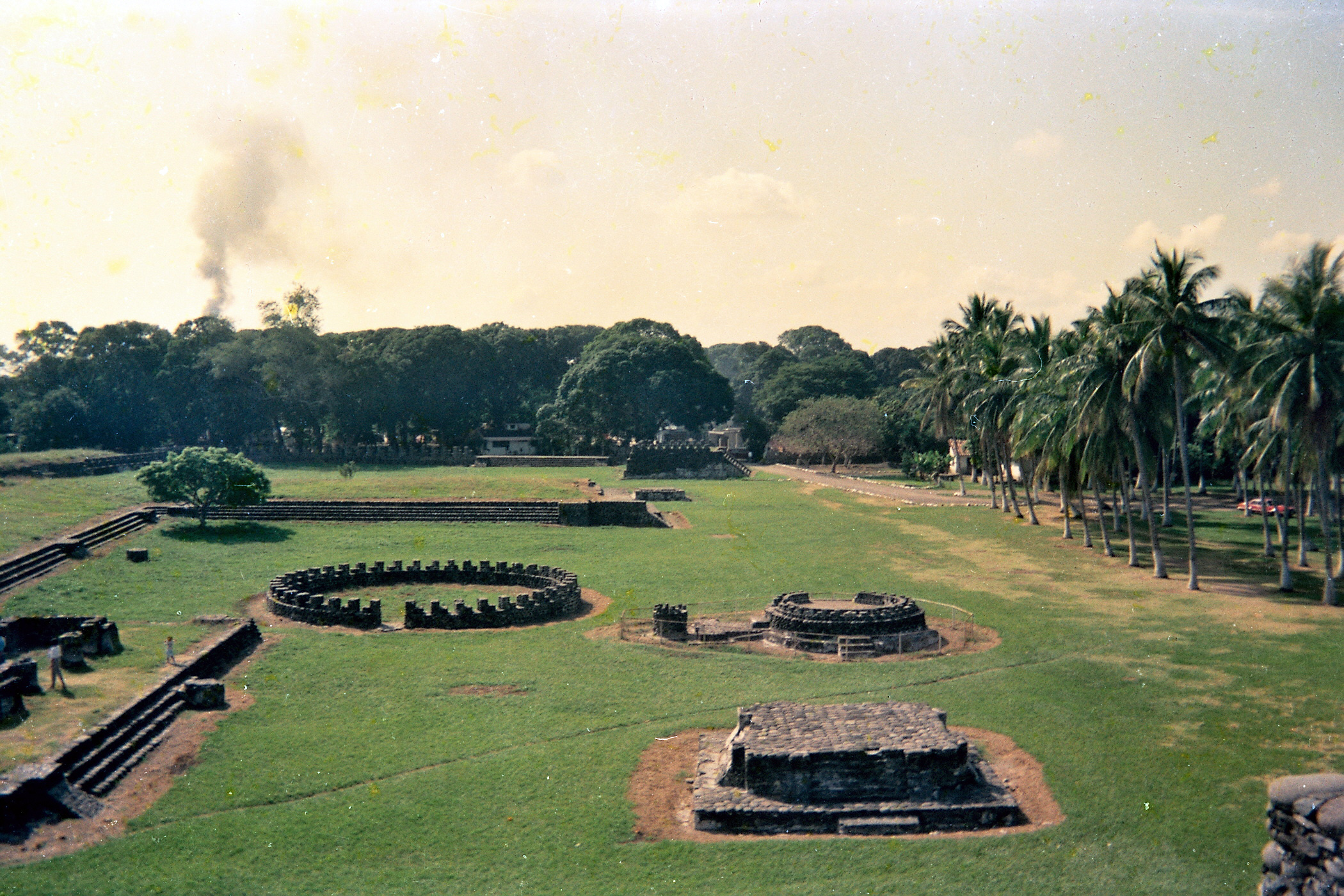
View of the main square of the ruins of the city of Cempoala, capital Totonac Nation, the first to establish a military alliance with the Castilian armies to attack the dominions of Aztec Triple Alliance or Ēxcān Tlahtolōyān.

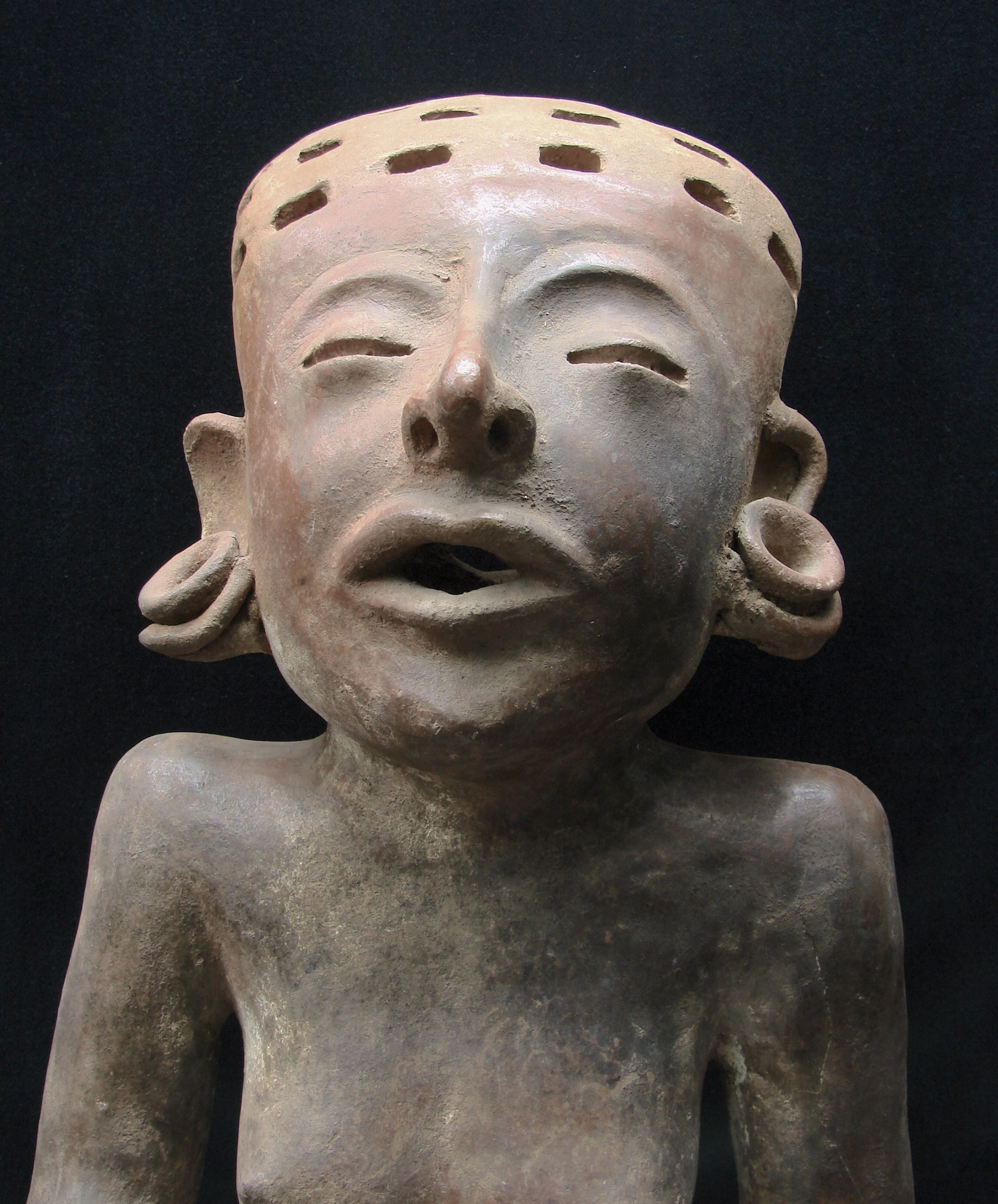
A ceramic Totonac statuette

In the 15th century, the Aztecs labeled the region of the Totonac "Totonacapan"; which then extended roughly from Papantla in the north to Cempoala in the south. Totonacapan was largely hot and humid. Along with the normal agricultural crops of maize, manioc, squash, beans, pumpkin and chili peppers, the region was noted for its production of cotton. Even during the disastrous central Mexican famine of 1450-1454, the region remained a reliable agricultural center. At that time, many Aztecs were forced to sell themselves or their family members as slaves to the Totonac in exchange for subsistence maize.

Although there exist some exceptions, such as El Tajín and Cempoala, the Totonacs of the lowlands did not live in urban spaces or villages. Rather, Totonac society was mostly based on semi-isolated familial units that subsisted off roza horticulture, which involved the burning of forest to grow crops like beans, squash, and corn. Besides horticulture, lowland Totonacs also relied on gathering, fishing, and hunting to live. At the time of Independence, only 11 Totonac villages existed, which primarily served as the "important locuses of communal culture." This dispersion and autarkic lifestyle allowed a remarking amount of Totonac autonomy in the Papantla basin until the beginning of the 20th century.

=== Food culture ===
Totonacs in the twentieth century led the peoples growing the highest quality vanilla, and most Mexican vanilla was produced by Totonacs. This widespread vanilla growth vastly shaped their society at the time. Seeking to profit from this vanilla boom, Totonac entrepreneurs pushed for privatization of formally communal lands due to the lands becoming more valuable. This resulted in massive social upheaval due to the longstanding traditions being threatened, and by the start of the 20th century, the old communal lands of the Totonacs had been mostly broken up and privatized.

Their association with agriculture of vanilla pre-dates the arrival of Columbus in the New World. While vanilla was long significant to Totonac culture, its importance as an export good did not emerge until the early-eighteenth century, when they traded with other Totonacs and with people in northern Oaxaca. The first regulation of the harvesting of Mexican vanilla appears in 1743, when the mayor of Papantla attempted to use a law for personal profit on the vanilla harvest. A second law regulating was promulgated in 1767, after Totonac vanilla growers in Colipa complained about thieves stealing immature vanilla pods. During Humboldt's travels in Mexico, most European imports of vanilla conveyed through the port of Veracruz, and Totonacs in the Misantla region harvested about 700,000 vanilla beans per year.

There is a total absence of comals, metates and manos meaning the Totonacs did not eat tortillas; however, even though corn was grown it did not form a large part of their diet. The Totonacs ate fruit, most notably zapotes, guavas, papayas, plantains and avocados. Men hunted and fished shark, turtle, deer, armadillo, opossums, and frogs. Women raised turkeys and dogs. Peasants as well as nobles ate corn porridge in the morning. Lunch was the main meal of the day and consisted of manioc, bean stew or even a rich meat sauce for the nobles. Fish and seafood as well as game was eaten by both nobles and farmers. The agave provided liquor.

=== Clothing ===
Totonac women were expert weavers and embroiderers; they dressed grandly and braided their hair with feathers. The Franciscan friar Bernardino de Sahagún stated that, in all aspects of their appearance, the women were "quite elegant", women wore skirts (embroidered for the nobles) and a small triangular poncho covering the breasts. Noble women wore shell and jade necklaces and earrings and often tattooed their faces with red ink. Married women wore their hair in the Nahuatl fashion while peasant women wore their hair long. Likewise, the noble men dressed well, adorning themselves with multicolored cloaks, loin cloths, necklaces, arm bands, lip plugs and devices made of the prized quetzal feathers. Hair was kept long with a thick tuft of hair on the top tied up with a ribbon.

=== Housing ===
Houses were generally thatched and had an overhang. They were rectangular in shape.

== History ==
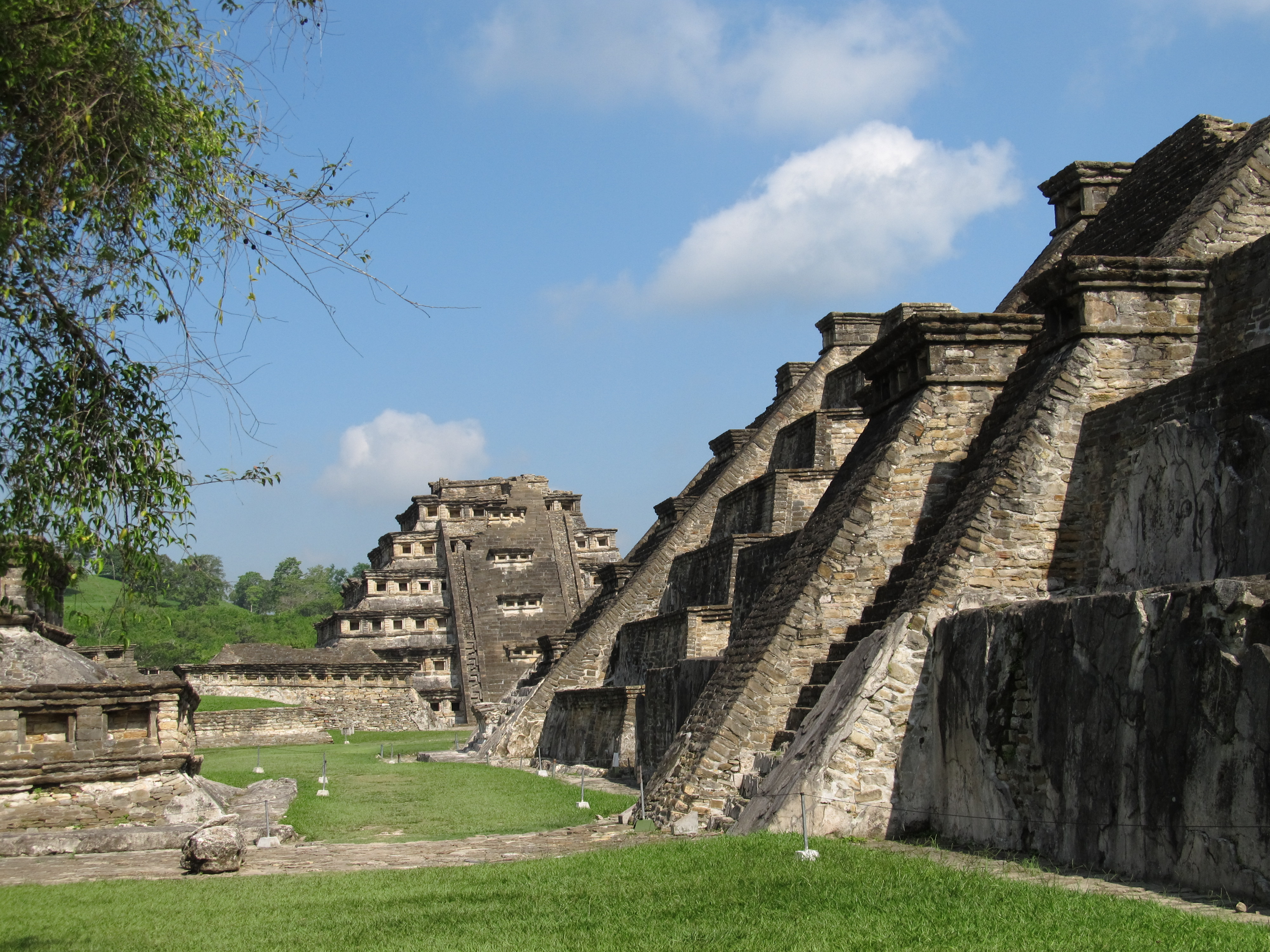
Ancient city of Tajín, Veracruz.

The region of Totonacapan was subject to Aztec military incursions from the mid-15th century until the Spanish arrival. Despite the establishment of Aztec fortifications throughout the region, rebellion was endemic. Major Totonac centers were Papantla, with an estimated population of 60,000 in 1519, Xalapa (around 120,000), and Cempoala (around 80,000). Cempoala was the first Indigenous city state visited by Hernán Cortés in his march to the Aztec capital of Tenochtitlán. The Totonacs of Cempoala joined forces with Cortés, and along with the Tlaxcalan people, contributed significantly to the Spanish conquest. Totonacapan became incorporated into the Spanish regime with comparatively little violence, but the region was ravaged by epidemic diseases during the 16th century. Today, approximately 90,000 Totonac speakers reside in the region.

=== Spanish influence ===
The area around Veracruz consists of rainy, hilly, lands, requiring farmers to constantly move to combat verdant overgrowth. Essentially, it was easier for the Totonacs to clear new patches of land for their agriculture rather than maintain cleared land. Because of constant movement essentially in response to extraordinary verdancy, Totonac people never really had settled community groups due to the need to move to promote their form of agriculture, leading to a culture that could be thought of as regionally nomadic agriculturalists.The Spanish could never truly and completely conquer the Totonacs. The Spaniards sought two things out of Indigenous inhabitants; mining resources (i.e. gold or silver) or settled populations for labor. Since there was no gold or silver in the Veracruz region, and because of the regionally nomadic community structure, the Totonacs were not candidates for slave labor. In summary, Spanish colonial influence upon the Totonacs was relatively weak when compared with Indigenous groups throughout central and south America.

==== Conflict in Papantla ====
In the late 19th century, the vanilla industry in Papantla was still massive, which placed a high value on its land. In 1891, the Mexican government wanted to claim and privatize the land, taking it away from being communally owned by the Totonacs. As Severiano Galicia led officials and troops into Papantla to survey and claim land, Totonac rancheros met them with force. This marked the start of nearly a decade of conflict in Papantla as the divided Totonacs fought either with or against federal troops in order to preserve or privatize the communal Totonac land. Some argue that this conflict directly contributed to the start of the Mexican Revolution as a whole.

== Language ==
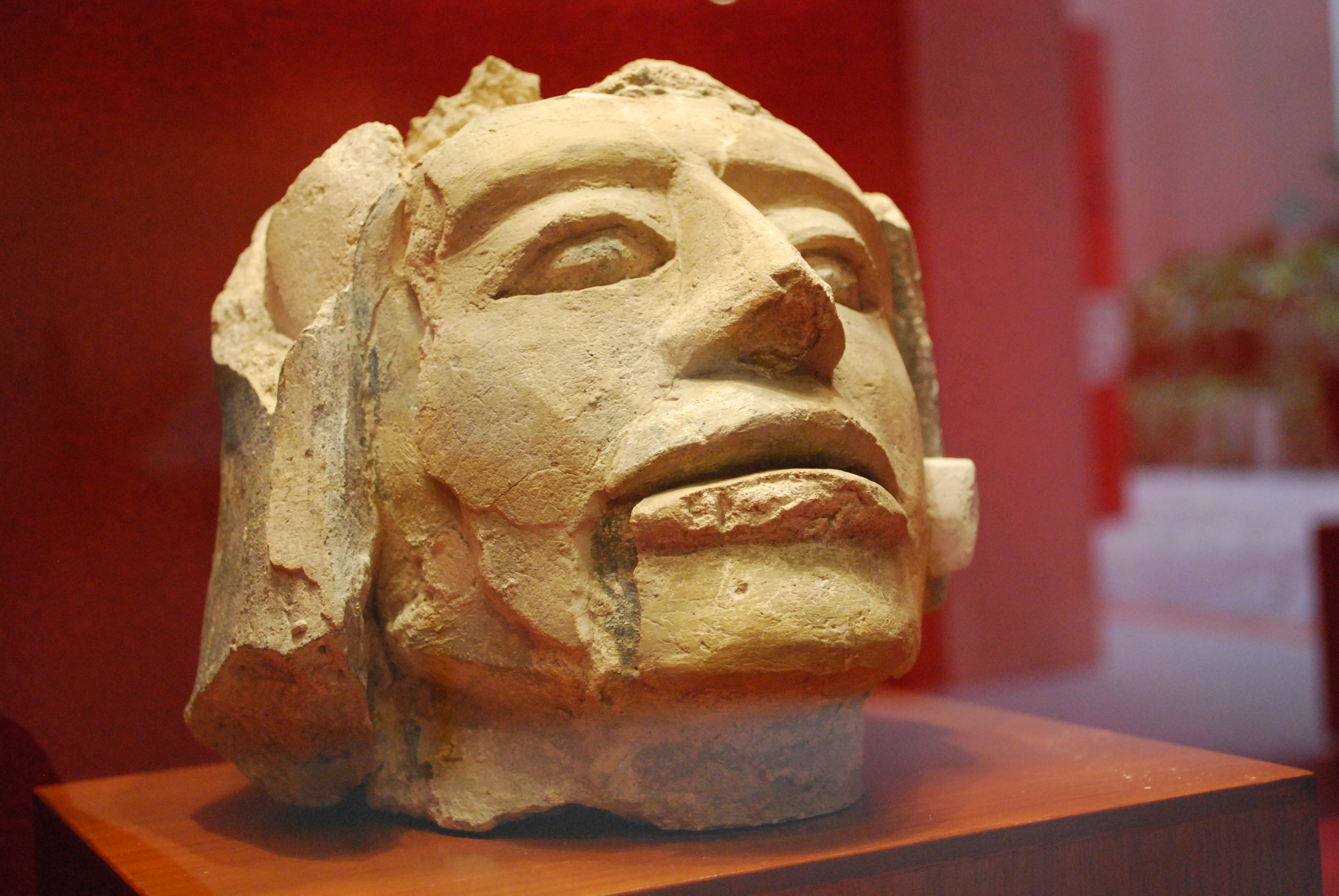
Head sculpture found at Tajín, Veracruz.

The Totonac people traditionally speak Totonac, which, together with Tepehua, form a small language family. This means that Totonacan languages are not related to other Native Mesoamerican languages such as those in the Mayan, Oto-Manguean or Uto-Aztecan families. There are several local varieties of Totonac that are not mutually intelligible. The first grammatical and lexical descriptions of Totonac accessible to Europeans (now lost) were by Fray Andrés de Olmos, who also wrote the first such descriptions of Nahuatl and Huastec (Teenek).

The main varieties of Totonac are:

- Papantla Totonac: spoken by some 80,000 speakers in El Escolín, Papantla, Cazones, Tajín, Espinal, and other towns along the Gulf Coast of Veracruz.
- North-Central Totonac: spoken roughly between Poza Rica in Veracruz and Mecapalapa, Pantepec, and Xicotepec de Juárez in Puebla.
- South-Central Totonac: spoken mostly in the Sierra Norte de Puebla, including the towns of Zapotitlán de Méndez, Coatepec, and Huehuetla in Puebla.
- Misantla Totonac: spoken by fewer than 500 people in Yecuatla and other communities outside the city of Misantla, Veracruz.

== Religion ==
Most present-day Totonacs are Roman Catholic. However, their Christian practice is often mixed with vestiges of their traditional religion, a notable instance being la Costumbre, a survival of an old rite of sacrifice in which various seeds are mixed with earth and the blood of fowls and dispersed over the planting fields.

The traditional religion was described in the early 1960s by the French ethnographer, Alain Ichon. No other major essay on Totonac religion has been found. Mother goddesses played a very important role in Totonac belief, since each person's soul is made by them. If a newly born child dies, its soul "does not go to the west, the place of the dead, but to the east with the Mothers". Ichon has also preserved for posterity an important myth regarding a maize deity, a culture hero with counterparts among most other cultures of the Gulf Coast and possibly also represented by the Classic Maya maize god. As to traditional curers, it is believed that they "are born during a storm, under the protection of thunder. They think that a lightning bolt strikes the house of a new-born baby ..., and makes it ... under its possession".

Other known deities include Chichiní (the sun) and Aktzin.

== See also ==
- Danza de los Voladores de Papantla
- Maya maize god
- Aktzin
