= Amixtlán =

Coordinates: 20°03′N 97°48′W

- Municipality and town
- Coat of arms
- Interactive map of Amixtlán
- Country: Mexico
- State: Puebla
- Time zone: UTC-6 (Zona Centro)

Amixtlán is a town and municipality in the Mexican state of Puebla.
