= Zautla =

Coordinates: 19.7147°N 97.6722°W

- Municipality
- Interactive map of Zautla
- Country: Mexico
- State: Puebla
- Time zone: UTC-6 (Zona Centro)

Zautla is a municipality in the Mexican state of Puebla.

== History ==
Hernán Cortés passed through here in 1519, on his expedition to Montezuma II. Called Xocotlan at the time, Diaz noted, "when we saw the gleam of the flat roof-tops and the Caciques' houses, and their cues and idol houses, which were very high and painted white, they seemed very much like certain towns in our native Spain. In fact we called the place Castilblanco." Olintecle was the Cacique. Diaz relates, "I remember that in the square where some of their cues stood were many piles of human skulls, so neatly arranged that we could count them, and I reckoned them at more than a hundred thousand." Olintecle provided "twenty of his best warriors to go with us."
