= Xochitlán de Vicente Suárez =

Coordinates: 19.9689°N 97.6292°W

- Municipality and town
- Interactive map of Xochitlán de Vicente Suárez
- Country: Mexico
- State: Puebla
- Time zone: UTC-6 (Zona Centro)

Coat of Arms of the Municipality of Xochitlán de Vicente Suárez, Puebla; Mexico.

Xochitlán de Vicente Suárez is a town and municipality in the Mexican state of Puebla.
