= Huitzilan de Serdán =

Coordinates: 19°58′N 97°41′W

- Municipality
- Coat of arms

- Location of the municipality in Puebla
- Country: Mexico
- State: Puebla

Population (2020)
  - Total: 15,928
- Time zone: UTC-6 (Zona Centro)

Huitzilan de Serdán is a municipality in the Mexican state of Puebla.

Mayor Manuel Hernández Pasión was murdered on October 10, 2017. His wife and a security guard were also killed.
