= Ixtacamaxtitlán =

Coordinates: 19°37′N 97°49′W

- Municipality
- Location of the municipality in Puebla
- Country: Mexico
- State: Puebla
- Time zone: UTC-6 (Zona Centro)

Ixtacamaxtitlán is a town and municipality in the Mexican state of Puebla.
