= Xochiapulco =

Coordinates: 19.8333°N 97.6500°W

- Municipality
- Coat of arms

- Location of the municipality in Puebla
- Country: Mexico
- State: Puebla
- Time zone: UTC-6 (Zona Centro)

Xochiapulco is a municipality in the Mexican state of Puebla.
