= Caxhuacan =

Coordinates: 20°04′N 97°36′W

- Municipality and town
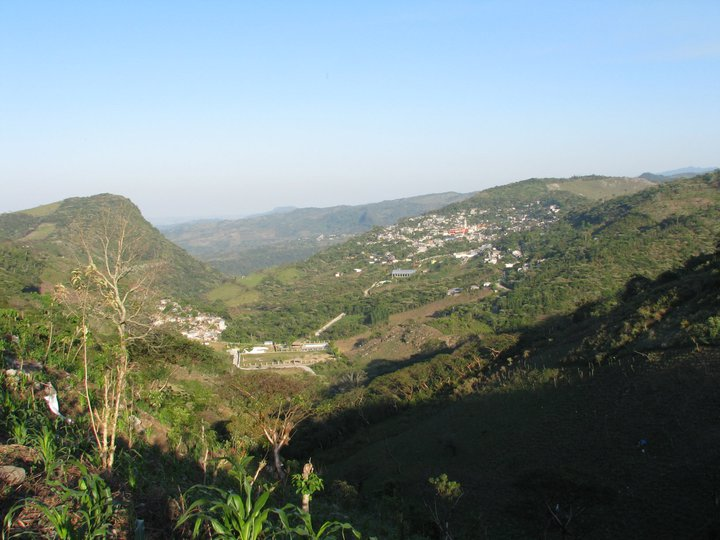

- Coat of arms
- Interactive map of Caxhuacan
- Country: Mexico
- State: Puebla
- Time zone: UTC-6 (Zona Centro)

Caxhuacan is a town and municipality in the Mexican state of Puebla.
