= Tepango de Rodríguez =

Coordinates: 20.0028°N 97.7969°W

- Municipality and town
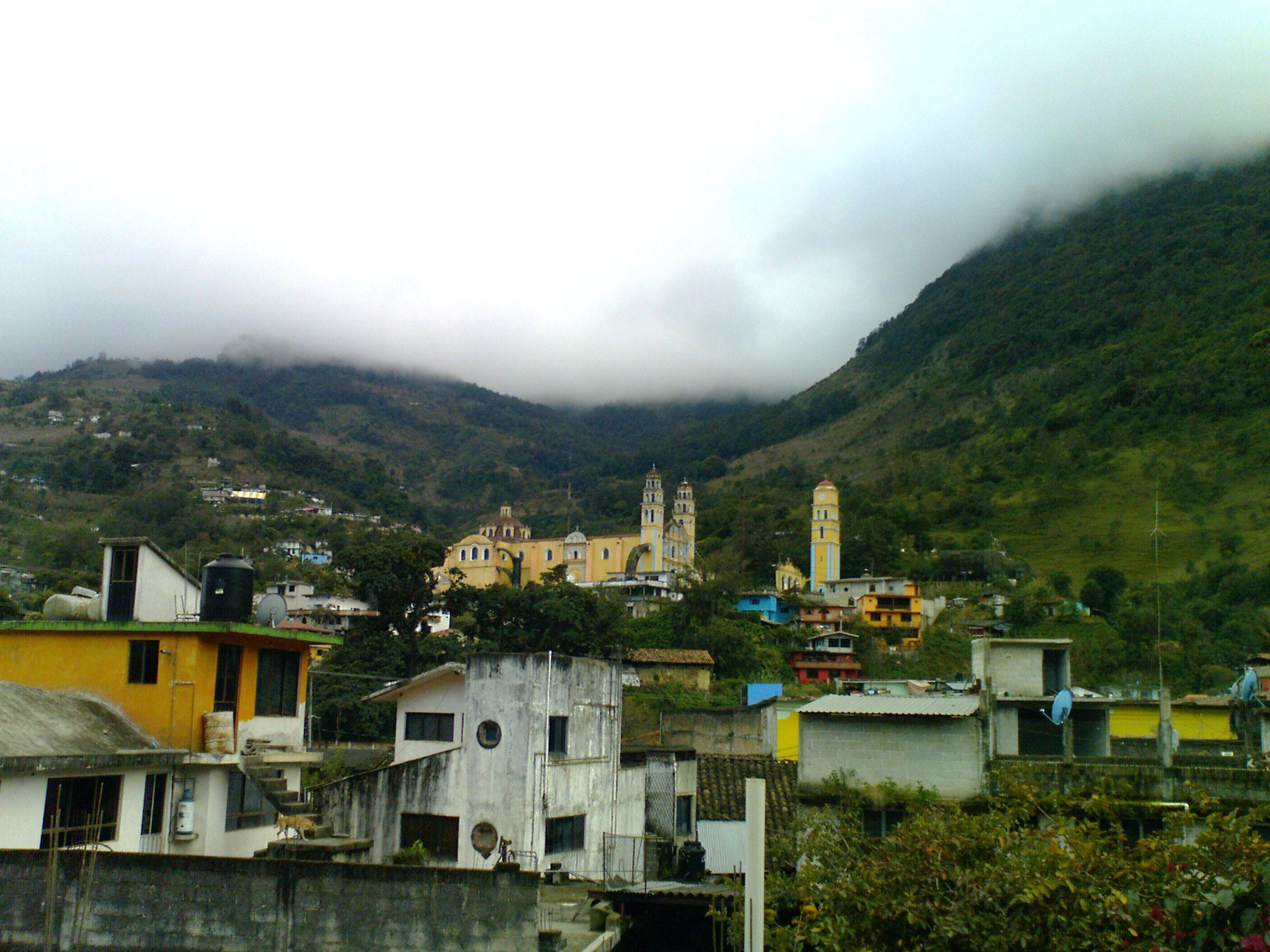
- Interactive map of Tepango de Rodríguez
- Country: Mexico
- State: Puebla
- Time zone: UTC-6 (Zona Centro)

Tepango de Rodríguez is a town and municipality in the Mexican state of Puebla.
