= Aquixtla =

Coordinates: 19°48′N 97°56′W

- Municipality and town
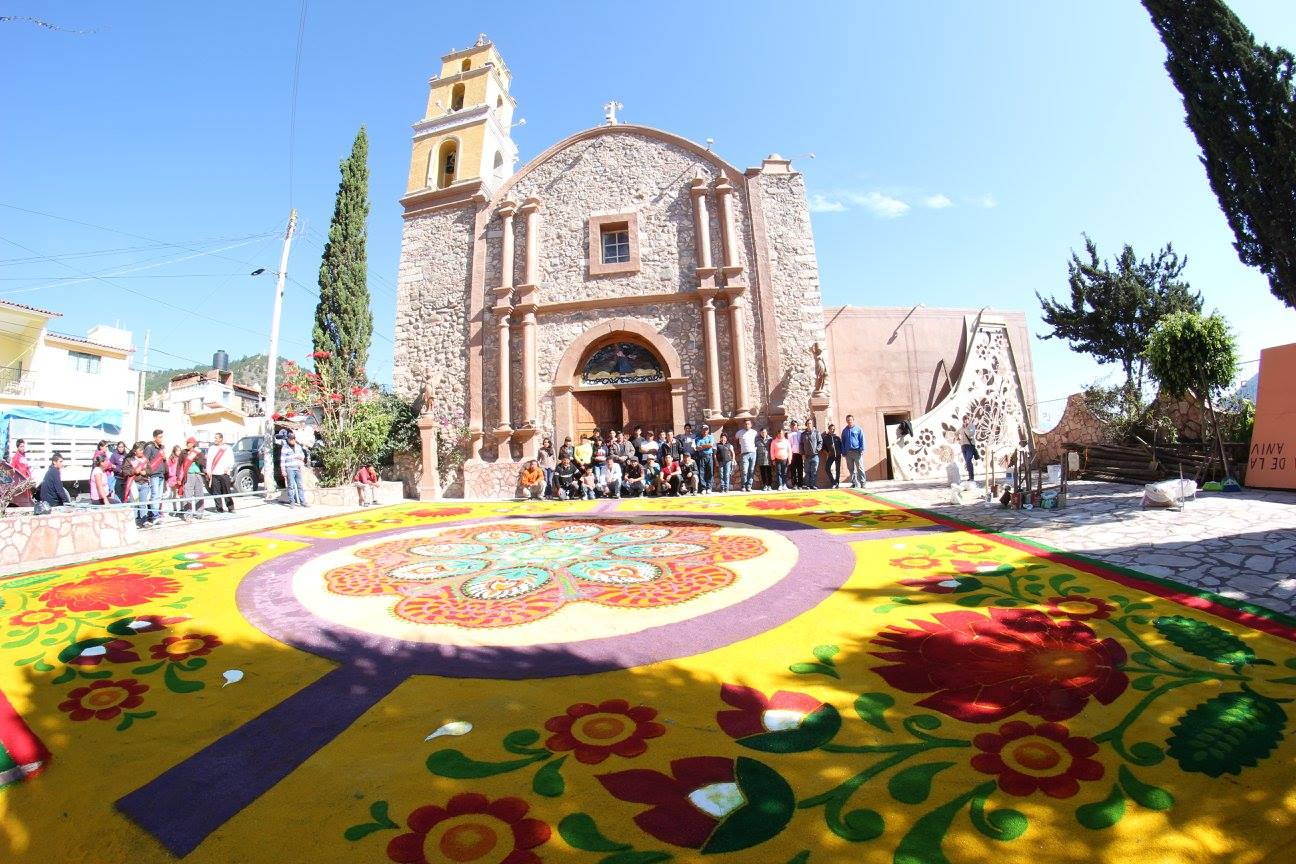

- Coat of arms
- Interactive map of Aquixtla
- Country: Mexico
- State: Puebla
- Time zone: UTC-6 (Zona Centro)

Aquixtla is a town and municipality in the Mexican state of Puebla.
