= Zapotitlán de Méndez =

Coordinates: 20°00′N 97°45′W

- Municipality and town
- Interactive map of Zapotitlán de Méndez
- Country: Mexico
- State: Puebla

Population (2020)
  - Total: 5,675
- Time zone: UTC-6 (Zona Centro)

Zapotitlán de Méndez is a town and municipality in the Mexican state of Puebla.
