= Atlequizayan =

Coordinates: 20°02′N 97°39′W

- Municipality and town
- Interactive map of Atlequizayan
- Country: Mexico
- State: Puebla
- Time zone: UTC-6 (Zona Centro)

Coat of Arms of the Municipality of Atlequizayan, Puebla; Mexico.

Atlequizayan is a town and municipality in the Mexican state of Puebla.
