= Hueytlalpan =

Coordinates: 20°02′N 97°42′W

- Municipality and town
- Interactive map of Hueytlalpan
- Country: Mexico
- State: Puebla
- Time zone: UTC-6 (Zona Centro)

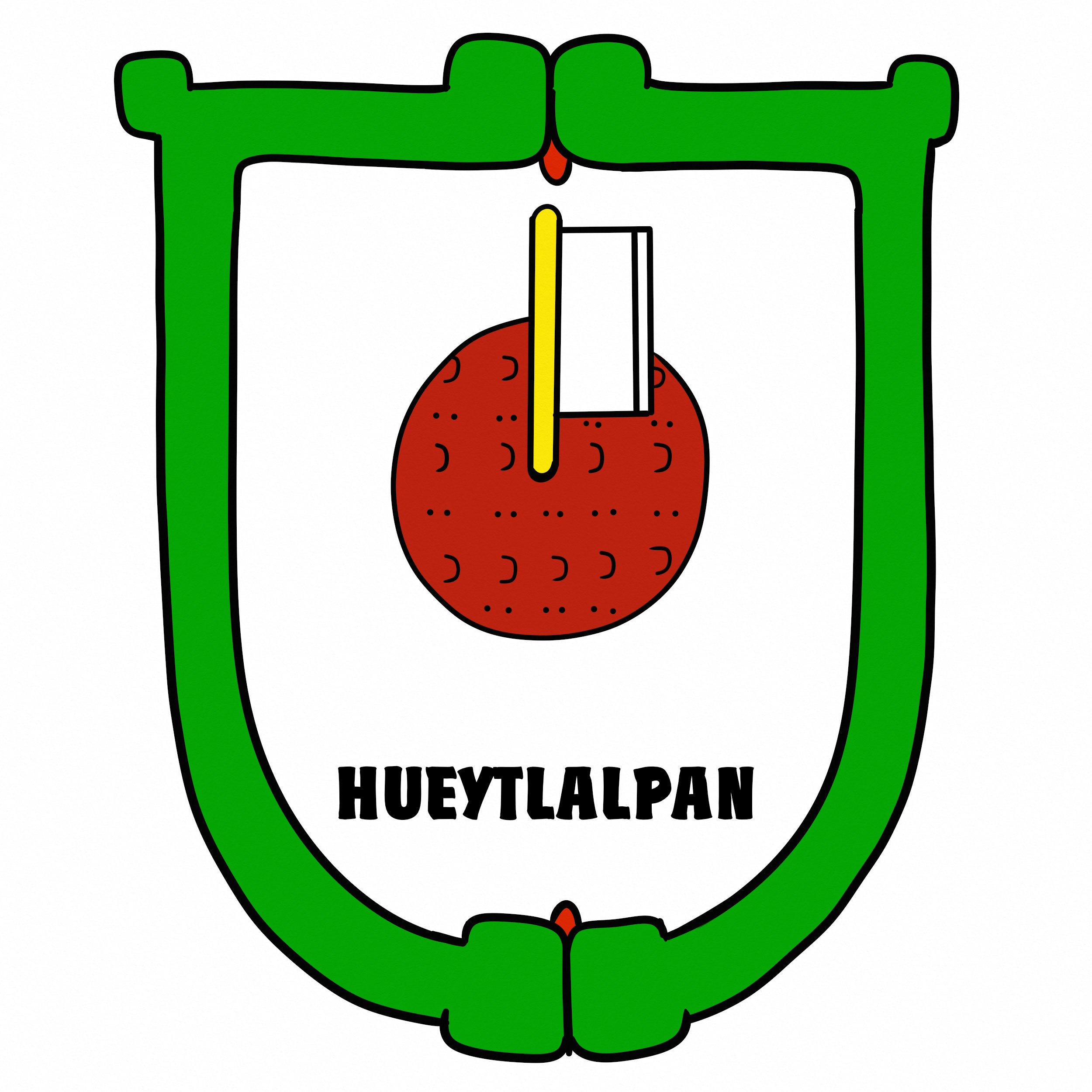
Coat of Arms of the Municipality of Hueytlalpan

Hueytlalpan is a town and municipality in the Mexican state of Puebla.
