= Olintla =

Coordinates: 20°06′N 97°41′W

- Municipality and town
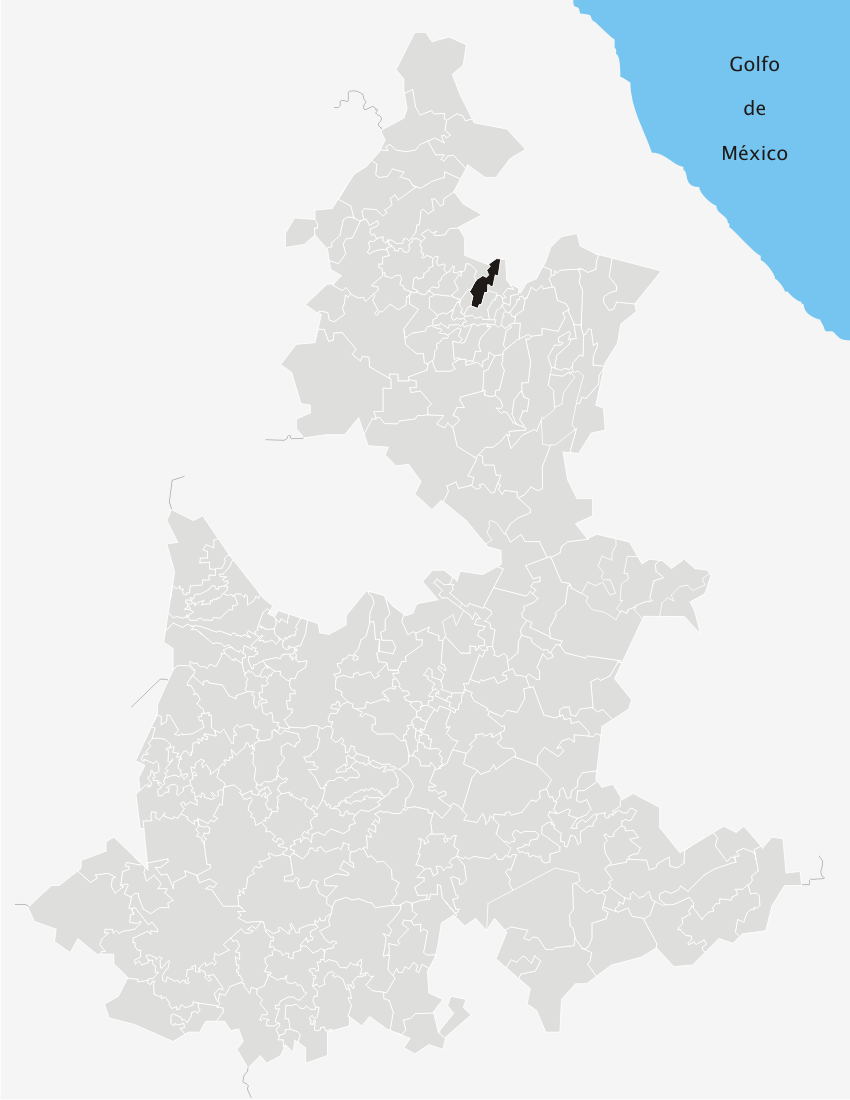
- Olintla location
- Interactive map of Olintla
- Country: Mexico
- State: Puebla
- Time zone: UTC-6 (Zona Centro)

Olintla is a town and municipality in the Mexican state of Puebla.
