= Coatepec, Puebla =

Coordinates: 19.4548°N 96.9589°W

Coatepec
- Municipality
- Coat of arms

- Location of the municipality in Puebla
- Country: Mexico
- State: Puebla
- Time zone: UTC-6 (Zona Centro)

Coatepec (Spanish: [koateˈpek]) is a municipality in the Mexican state of Puebla.
