= Ixtepec, Puebla =

Ixtepec
- Municipality
- Location of the municipality in Puebla
- Coordinates: 20.0261°N 97.6467°W
- Country: Mexico
- State: Puebla

Population (2020)
  - Total: 6,950
- Time zone: UTC-6 (Zona Centro)

Ixtepec is a municipality in the Mexican state of Puebla.
