= Zacatlán =

Zacatlan
- City
- Zacatlan de las Manzanas
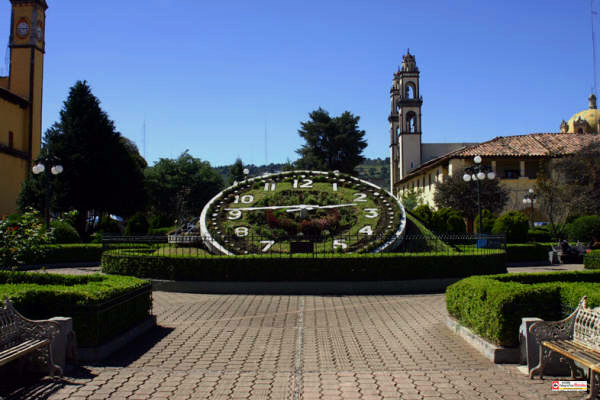
- Main plaza with flower clock

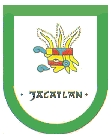
- Seal
- Interactive map of Zacatlan
- Coordinates: 19°55′55″N 97°57′36″W
- Country: Mexico
- State: Puebla
- Municipality: Zacatlán
- Founded: 1562
- Municipal Status: 19th century

Government
  - Municipal President: Luis Márquez Lecona
- Elevation (of seat): 2,000 m (6,600 ft)

Population (2020)
  - Total: 39,203
- Time zone: UTC-6 (Central (US Central))
- Postal code (of seat): 73310
- Area code: 975
- Demonym: Zacatecos

Zacatlán (Spanish: [sakaˈtlan]; Nahuatl: pronounced [saˈkat͡ɬan]) is a city and municipal seat of Zacatlán Municipality located in the Sierra Norte de Puebla region of Puebla in central Mexico. The area is known for its production of apples, other fruit, cider and fruit wines, which are promoted through the annual Feria de la Manzana and Festival de la Sidra. It is also home to the Relojes Centenario company, the first clock factory in Latin America and the builder of the city's double sided flower clock in the main square. The historic center of the city is filled with traditional houses with red tile roofs and Zacatlan was designated a “Pueblo Mágico” in 2011. Outside of the city proper, there is a significant indigenous population, the Piedras Encimadas Valley with its rock formations and various waterfalls and ravines.

== The city ==
The city of Zacatlán is located at an altitude of 2000 meters above sea level in the Sierra Norte de Puebla region of the state, 130 kilometers from the state capital. Its main economic activities relate to agriculture and commerce. The city is next to the Ajajalpan River, a tributary of the Necaxa and whose waters eventually flow into the Gulf of Mexico via the Tecolutla. It is surrounded by hundreds of thousands of apple and other fruit trees, which fill the air with their scent during blossom season. The historic center of the town is marked by large houses and other buildings, some over a hundred years old, with pitched roofs covered in red clay tile, as well as stone paved streets. This and other features of the area and the surrounding area made the city the 39th Pueblo Mágico in Mexico.

The city centers on its main square, which like many others in Mexico has a kiosk which hosts live music on Sundays. However, it most famous feature is its flower clock, made by the workshops of León Olvera, founder of the Centenario Clock company. This clock has two faces, each of which is five meters in diameters. It is unique in that it is the only double faced flower clock whose hands are moved by a single mechanism.

On one side of the plaza is the municipal palace or government building. This structure dates to 1876 and has a Neoclassical facade, with seventeen arches that contain the names of the communities that contributed to the building's construction.

On the opposite side is the former Franciscan monastery founded in 1567, which was the center of evangelization efforts for the area. It is the oldest such construction in the state of Puebla and the church is the only one in Latin America which has been in continuous use since its founding. In the courtyard of the monastery, there is a fountain called the Fuente de las Sirenas (Fountain of the Mermaids). After years of abandonment, the complex underwent extensive restoration in the 2000s. This work discovered colonial era murals on the interior walls. This mural work contains images of deer, bees and jaguars, houses with thatched roofs and daily scenes with Spanish and indigenous people.

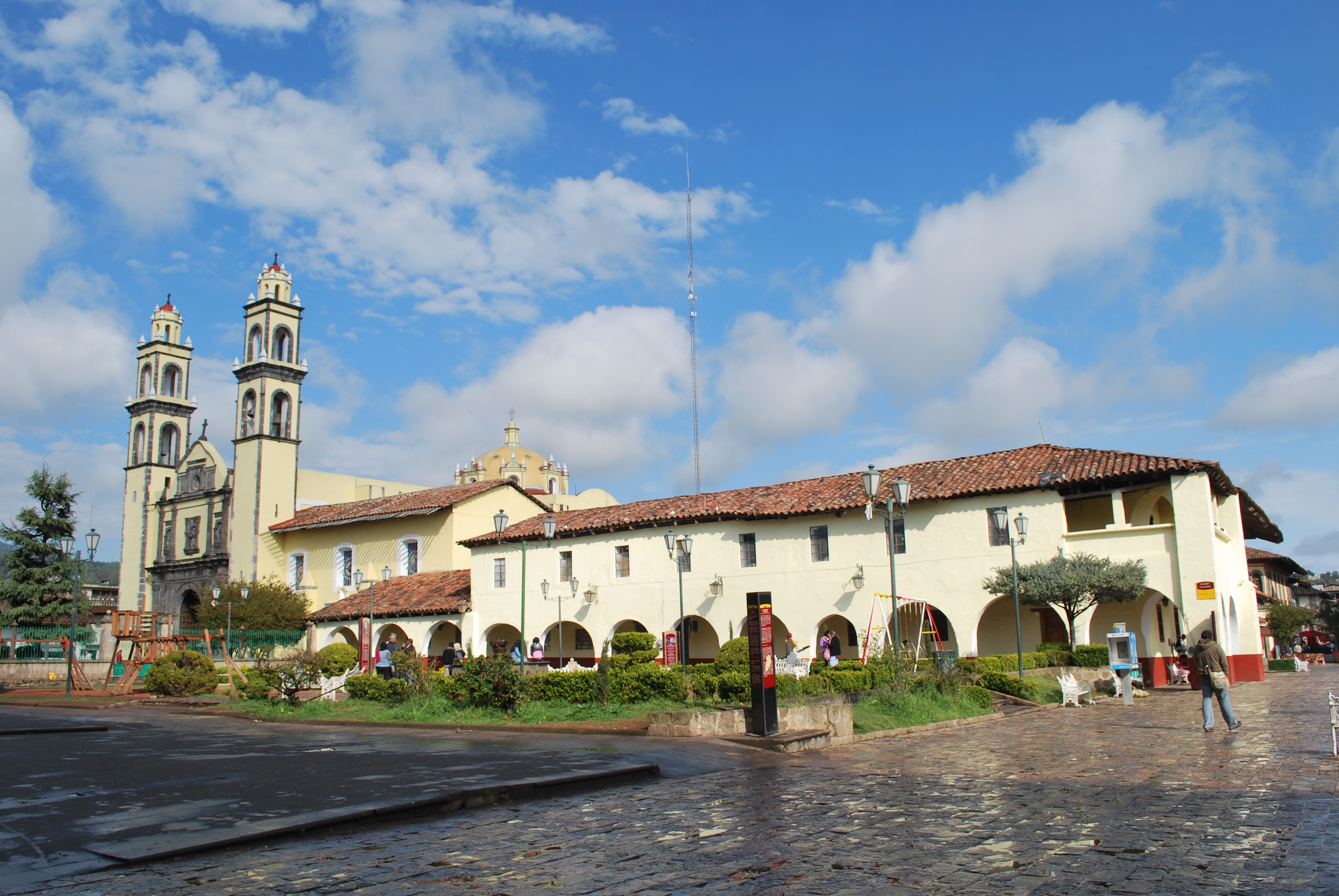
View of the San Pedro parish

The San Pedro parish church is located near the monastery, just off the main square. It is a basilica type church in Renaissance style with its main portal dating from 1564. The facade has a sculpture of Saint James the Greater flanked by angels which wear Totonaca style loincloths and boots. Its main doors are made of wood and the Virgin of Guadalupe chapel displays gold leaf work and a number of oil paintings, which were done by local artists. In the cupola, there are portraits of the Four Evangelists.

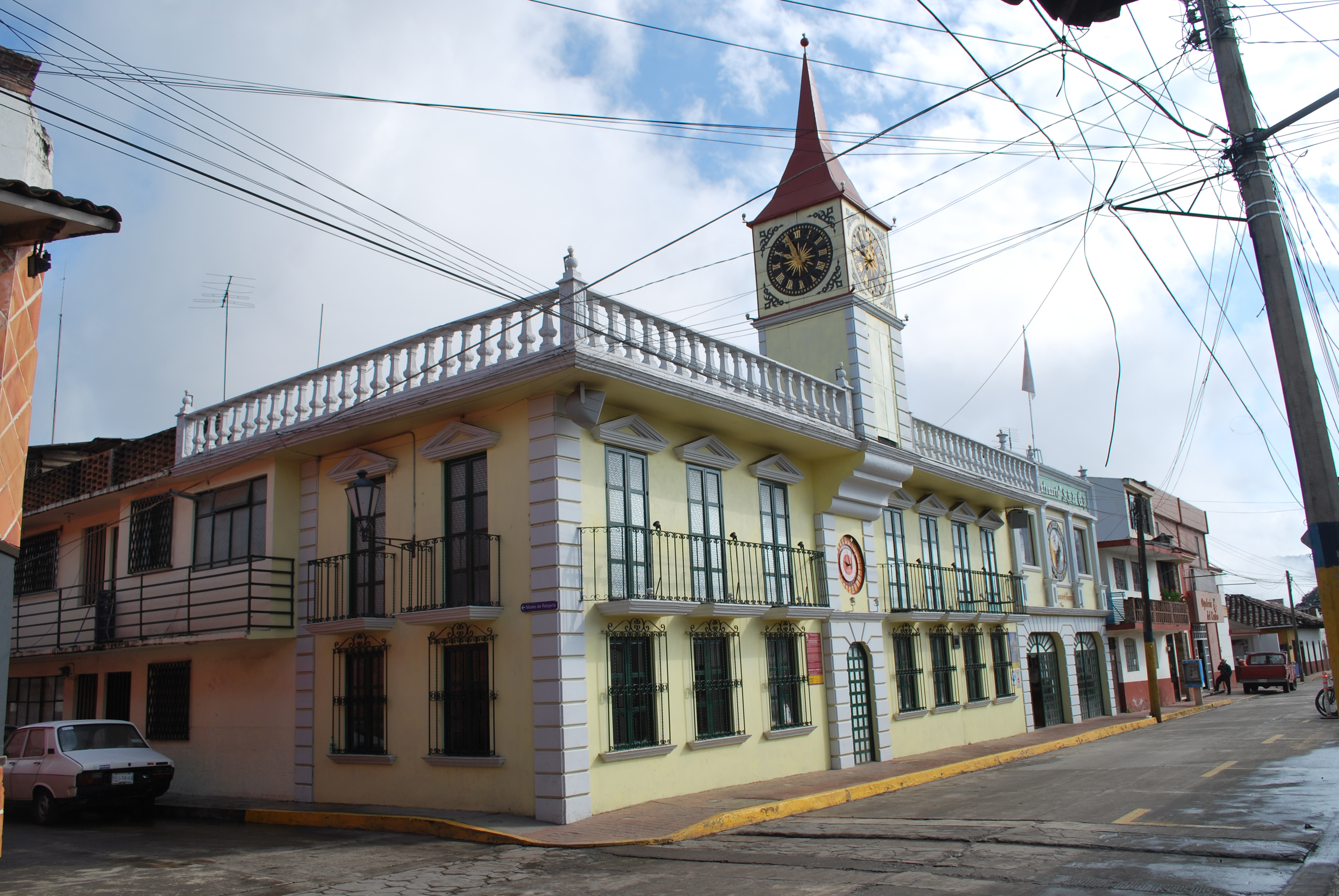
View of Centenario Clocks

Zacatlán has a reputation for tinkerers, including Abraham Trejo, who created his own car and Gabriel Melecio, who invented a machine to toast coffee beans. However, the best known of these is Alberto Olvera Hernandez, who founded the Centenario Clock company. Olvera Hernandez grew up on a farm outside of Zacatlán called Coyotepec. He became interested in clocks and watches after taking apart a broken clock at his home. He was self-taught, even making the needed tools himself with only the materials and other items found on the farm. He began to build and sell clocks in 1909 and created his first monumental clock in 1918, when he was seventeen years old. This prompted the founding the first clock factory in Latin America, Centenario, which specialized in monumental clocks, located on Calle Nigromante near the town center. Its monumental clocks have been installed in buildings, parks, plazas and commercial centers in Mexico and other countries. One of the first clocks produced by Olvera Hernández is over eighty years old and still functions in a church bell tower in Chignahuapan. There are examples of Centenario clocks in most parts of Mexico today. One of these clocks is in Tulantepec, Hidalgo, and plays the Mexican national anthem in the morning and evening and his distinct melodies for each quarter-hour. It is not electric but completely mechanical using counterweights. However, the factory's most famous piece is the flower clock in the Zacatlán main square. Today, the Centenario factory employs about fifty people and is open to visits by the public. In the upper part of the building, there is a clock museum inaugurated in 1993 and dedicated to the founder. It contains original and reproduction timepieces over history in the world. They include timepieces using water, the sun, sand and candles. One is a figure of Merlin, whose arms indicate the time but only for 12 hours during the day. At the end of the day, his arms lower to “rest.”

The cultural center has a Regional Museum, which displays pre Hispanic artifacts which come from a local ceremonial center as well as arms from the Mexican War of Independence and the report from the autopsy of Venustiano Carranza.

The city's main annual festival is the Feria de la Manzana or Apple Fair, which has been held each August since 1941. This event attracts about 300,000 visitors over the course of a week, offering about 140 different activities. These include the crowning of an Apple Queen, clock exposition, food, other exhibits and concerts by symphony orchestras as well as popular artist such as Juan Gabriel, Alejandro Fernández, Aleks Syntek and Grupo Elefante. The festival generally exhibits and sells over 100,000 crates of apples as well as hundreds of crates of plums and pears. The festival is dedicated to Our Lady of the Assumption.

Another major apple-related event is the Cider Festival in November, which draws about 10,000 visitors each year. The town produces about a million bottles of cider each year, using about 10,000 tons of apples. It also promotes other local projects such as jams, soft drinks, preserved fruit and other fruit wines.

The Festival Cuaxochitl, which occurs in May, is dedicated to the area's indigenous ethnicities. The town hosted its first Feria de Activación Física Regional (Regional Physical Activity Fair) in 2011 as part of federal efforts to combat obesity. The event included classes in aerobics, exhibitions of tae kwan do and a basketball tournament.

A cheese filled bread is a local specialty, sold only in the city.

== History ==
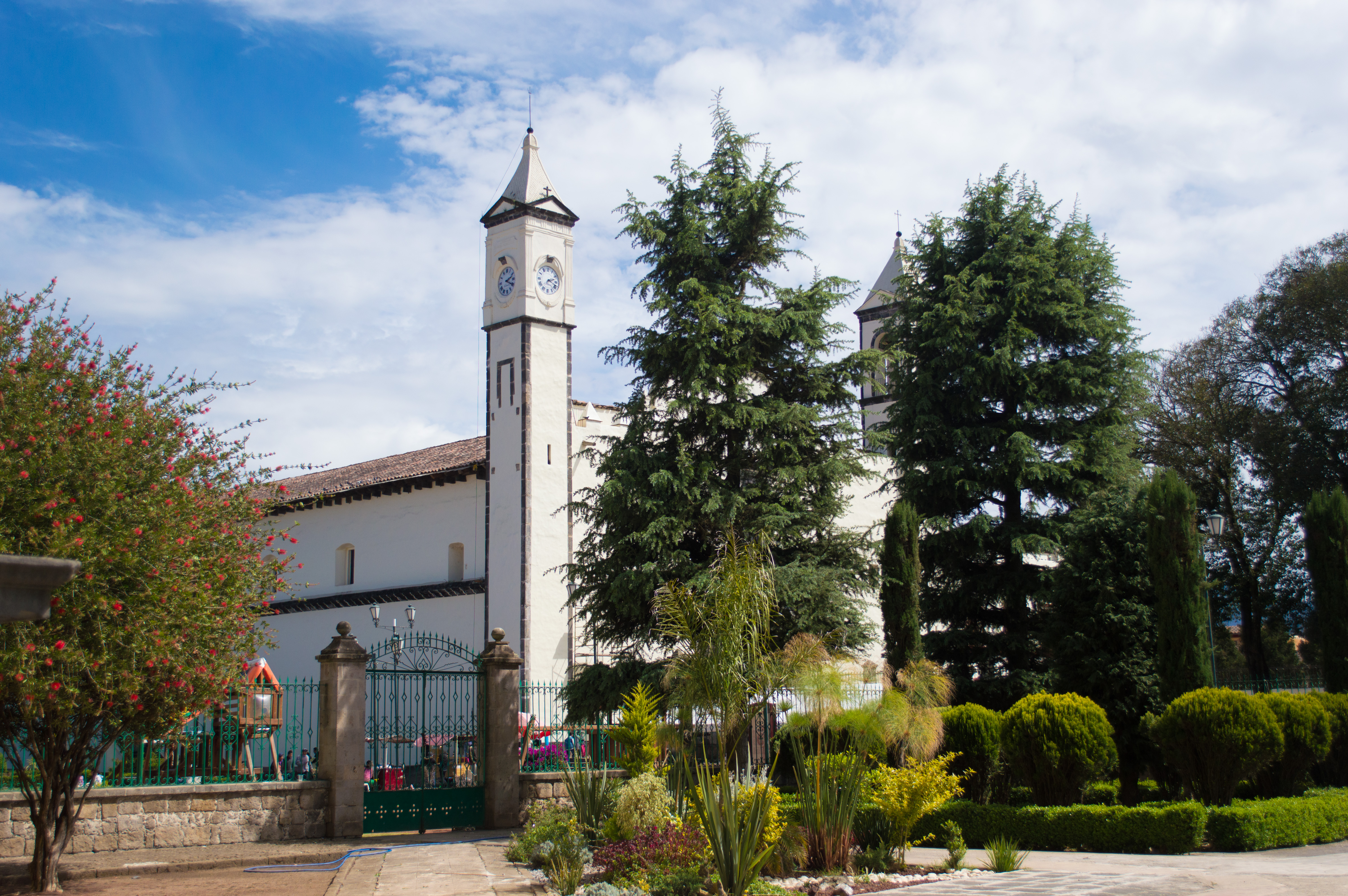
Ex convento de San Francisco de Asís

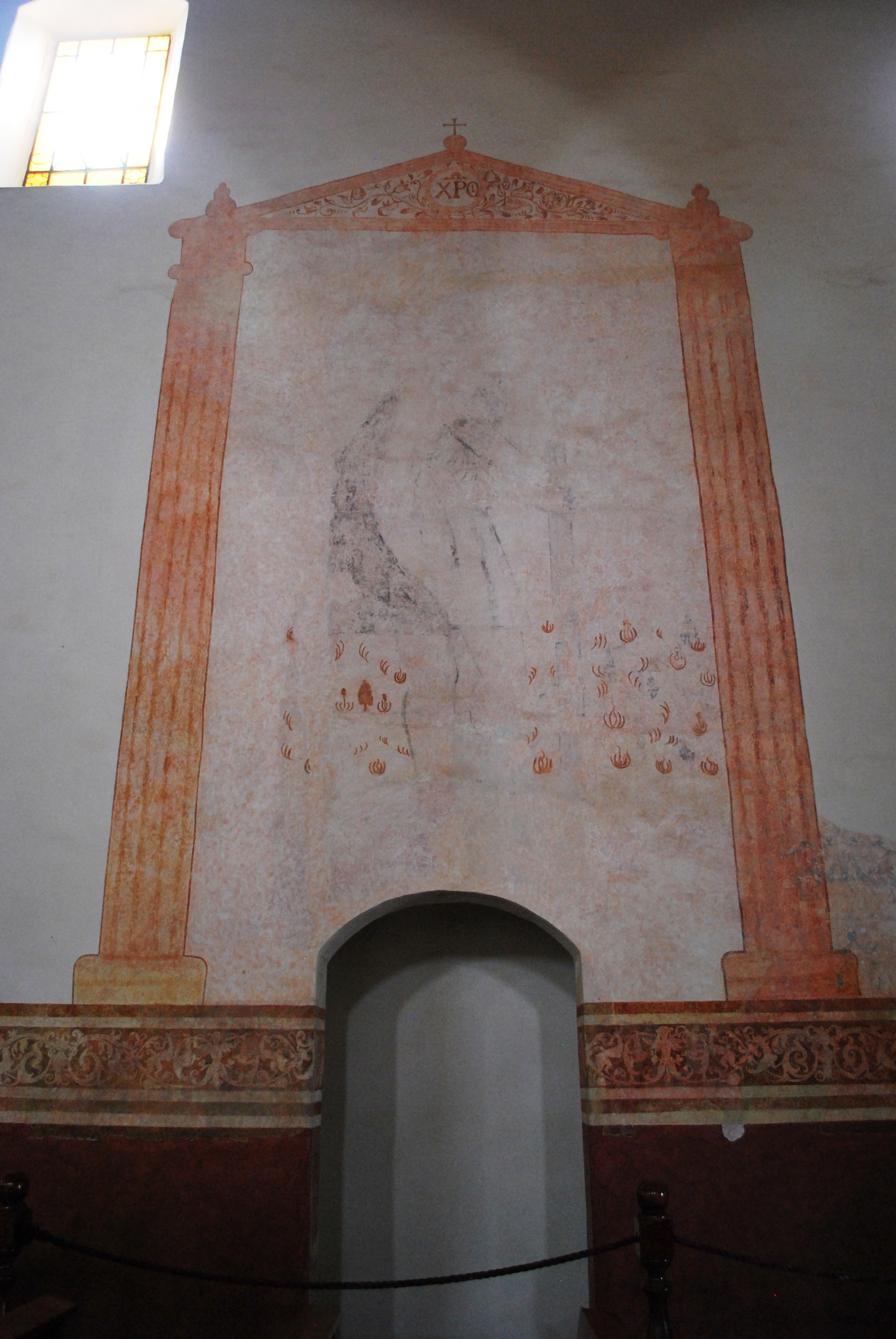
One of the mural remnants of the former monastery

The name Zacatlán comes from Nahuatl and mean “place of zacate grass.” The appendage “de las Manzanas” is Spanish for “of the apples,” which is derived from the area's abundance production of apples. The city is known by two other names Zacatlan de Marques Galindo and San Pedro Zacatlan.

The first to settle the area was the Zacateca tribe located in what are now Otlatlán and Tenamitec around 583. In 1115, Chichimecas related to King Xolotl, founder of Texcoco, came to dominate the area. In the 12th century, Olmeca-Xicallancas, also Nahuatl speakers, came into the area from Tlaxcala, but were later displaced by the Toltecs after the fall of Tula. After this, there were other migrations of Nahuatl speakers in the area, and this was the most common language here by the early sixteenth-century. Later the area would come under the influence of the Aztec Empire, included in the tributary province of Tlapacoya. However, it likely retained a particular degree of autonomy due to its location near Tlaxcala, a long-standing enemy of the Aztecs, and attempted to present itself as independent. Supported by Moctezuma II, Zacatlan waged war against Tlaxcala and Tetela, and in return gave Moctezuma gifts. It additionally paid tribute in maize and clothing. Besides typical Mesoamerican staple crops, Zacatlan also produced maguey, pita, lime, amole, and wild game, and its merchants sold these in distant places.

After the Spanish conquest of the Aztec Empire, Spanish soldiers took possession of the land and its people under the encomienda system. The first Spanish lord of the Zacatlán area was Hernán López de Avila. In 1522, the indigenous inhabitants were moved to what is now Tenamitec, then to San Pedro Atmatla in 1524. In 1562, they were moved again to found what is now Zacatlán. The Franciscans built a monastery and cemetery here. In 1661, this complex came under the control of regular priests. In 1676, the area was reorganized as the Indian Republic of Zacatlán. The cultivation of apples was introduced in the early 17th century and has been a major economic factor since.

In 1776, there was a conspiracy against Spanish rule in the area but this was discovered and the leaders condemned to death. The next efforts here for independence occurred in 1810 under Luis Servia and Andrés Aguilera, organized more the following year by José Francisco Osorno. This leader had a number of local victories and controlled much of the Zacatlán area.

During the Mexican War of Independence, the town manufactured arms and coins for the cause. After Independence in 1825, the area was part of the Department of Puebla with authority over Huauchinango and Tetela.

It was the seat of government for the state of Puebla in 1847 during the Mexican American War, earning it the title of city that same year.

At the end of the 19th century, the municipality supported the Plan de la Noria and Plan de Tuxtepec in favor of Porfirio Díaz. Venustiano Carranza passed through here during the Mexican Revolution.

In the late 2000s, the monastery complex underwent extensive restoration. Prior to this, the complex was almost completely abandoned. The restoration work discovered the murals.

The city invested 20 million pesos in the 2000s to receive the designation of Pueblo Mágico in 2011.

== Geography ==
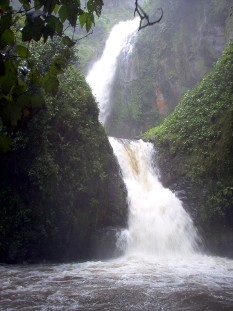
Tulimán waterfall

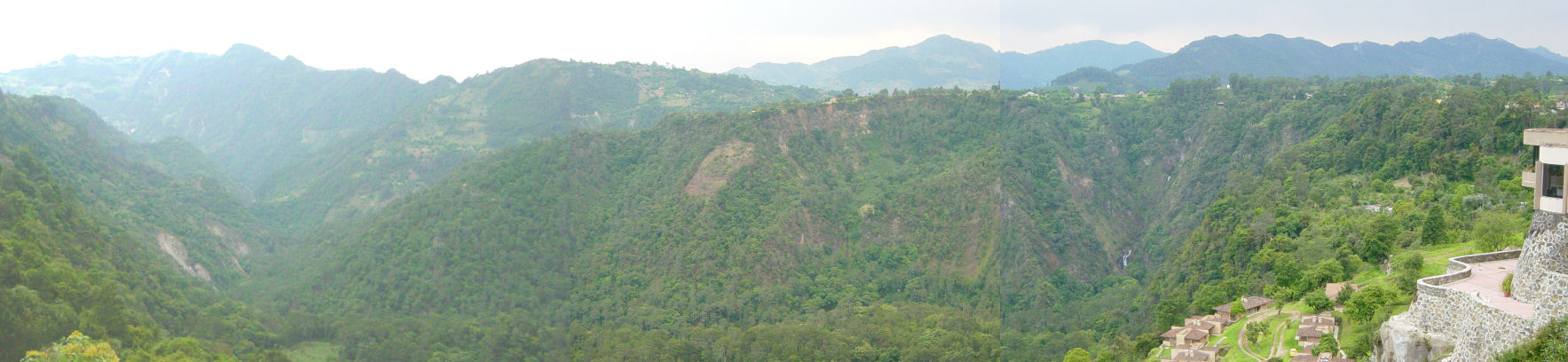
Ravines near the city

The municipality is found in the southwest of the Sierra Norte de Puebla in a transition zone. The landscape consists of more or less individual mountains interspersed with large and small flat areas. There are caves interspersed in these mountain areas. Most of these flat areas are tilted towards the eastern coast with the Gulf of Mexico. The municipality proper is in one of these larger flat areas about fourteen km long and nine km wide with an average altitude of 2,500 meters above sea level with variations between 1,360 and 2,600. Main elevations include Moxhuite, Kiosco, Matlahuacala, Los Cazares, Tecoxcalman, Peña Blanca, Xahuatl, Tampol Tenampulco, Titicanale, Chignahuimazatla, Texis Proterito, Pelón and Zempoala.

=== Hydrography ===
The area drains towards the Gulf of Mexico as part of the Tecolutla River basin and because of the rugged terrain is filled with small fast winding rivers. One of the main rivers here is the Ajajalpan, a main tributary for the Tecolutla. This rivers forms part of the municipality's border with Alhuacatlán. Other rivers include the Tulimán, Hueyapan, Cedazo Maquixtla, Tepexco, La Ferrería, Tlayaqia, Canautla and Atlixtala, which all empty into the Ajajalpan. The rugged terrain means that the rivers form waterfalls such as the Tulimán. This waterfall is the tallest in the area, with an estimated height of between 250 and 300 meters. It is located in the Ejido Tulimán about forty minutes outside the municipal seat.

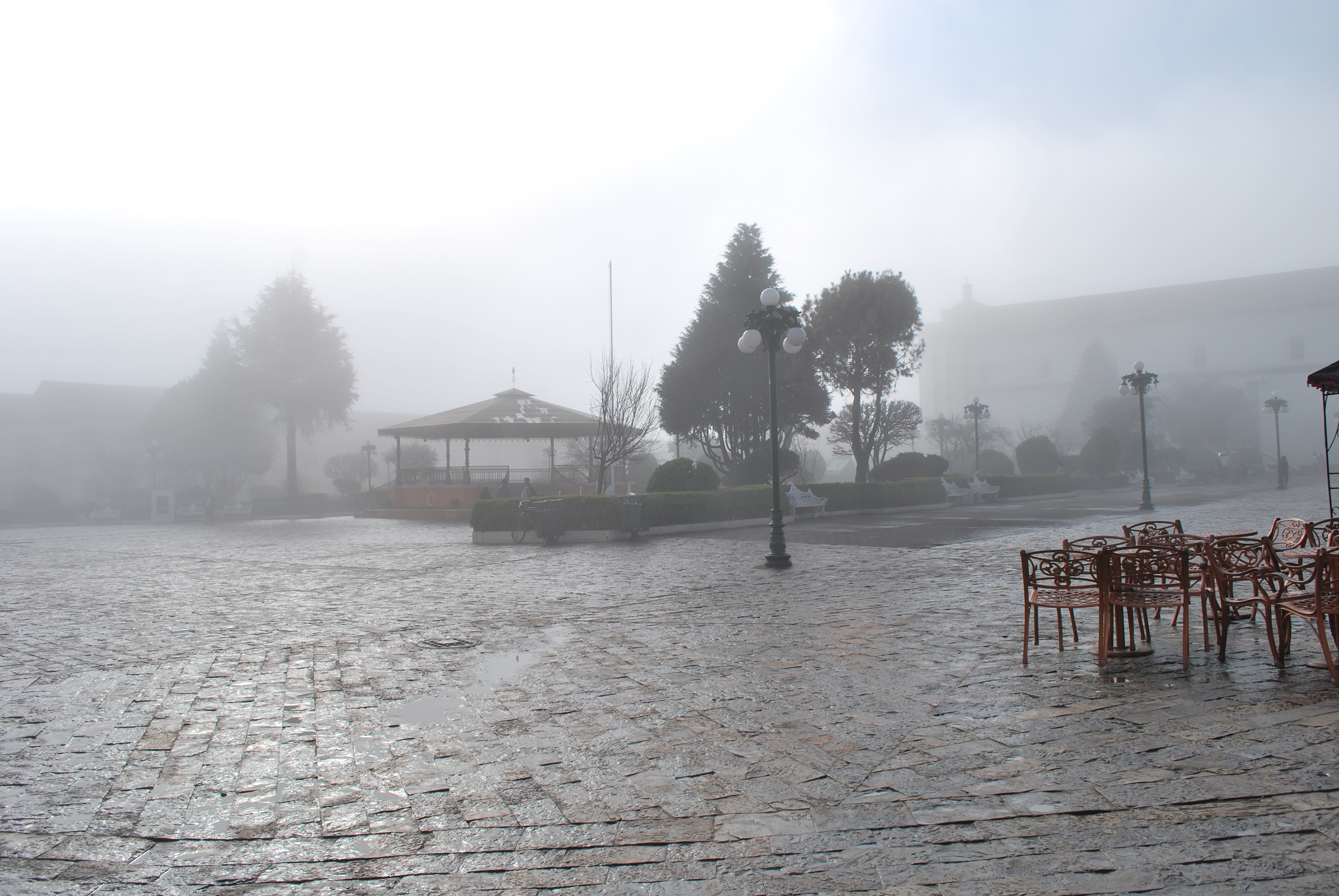
Main square of Zacatlán with early morning fog

=== Climate ===
Zacatlán has a cool, damp climate most of the year. The climate is temperate with average annual temperatures varying between 12C and 18C. Differences within the territory relate to rainfall with the driest areas are in the south and the wettest in the north. However, there is rain year round, with fog present on most mornings and night, with very thick fog common.

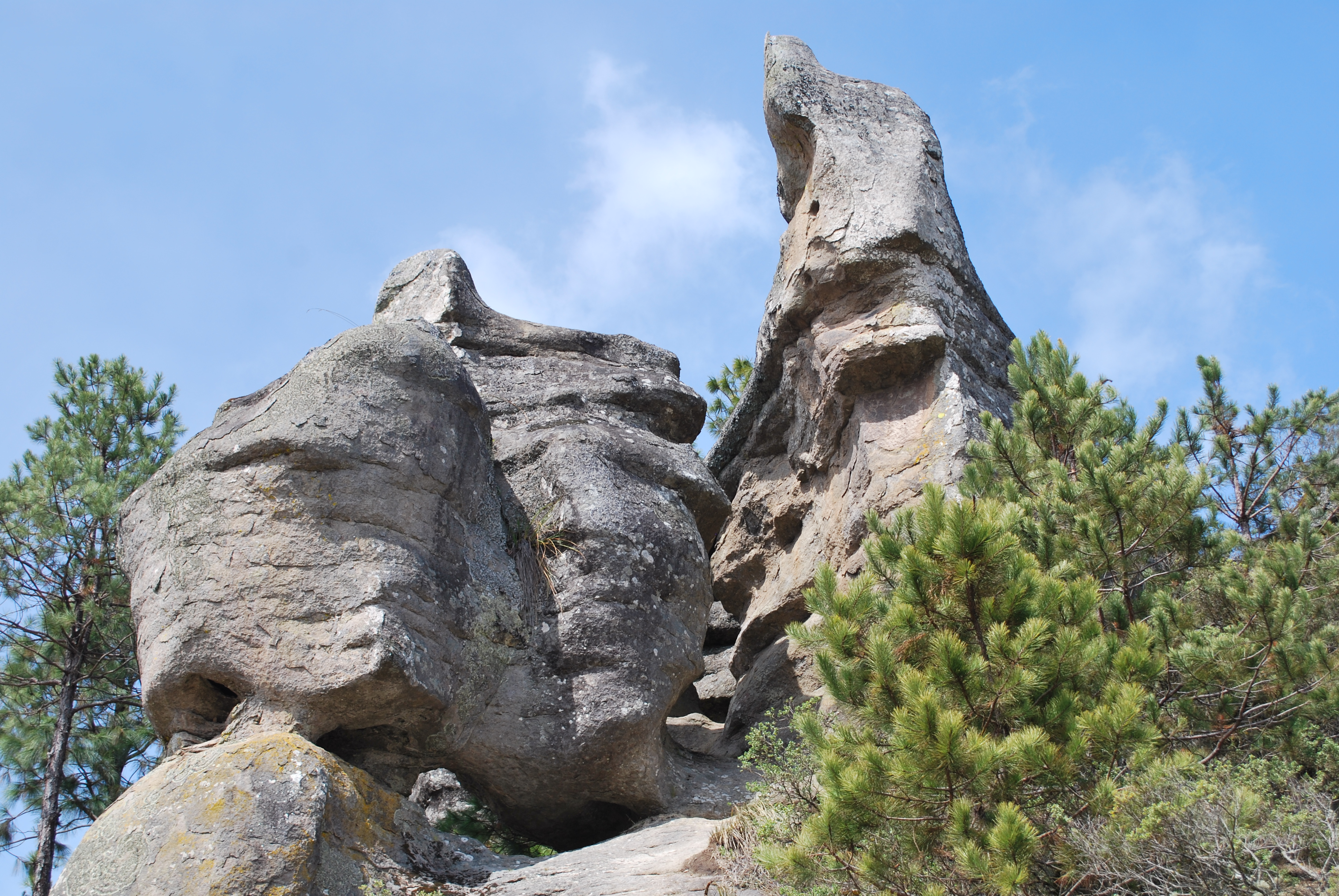
One of the rock formation in the Piedras Encimadas Valley

=== Flora and soil ===
The municipality has large extensions of conifer forest, mostly pine trees although there are areas with a pine-oak mix and some with semi tropical vegetation. Tree species in the area include white and various other pines, strawberry trees and oyamel fir. The largest extensions of forest are found in the center, north, east and extreme west.

Piedras Encimadas Valley is located in San Miguel Tenango. It is private land that extends over 300 hectares owned by a group of thirty partners. Legend states that the rocks were giants who were punished by a pre Hispanic god by being turned to stone. Other stories about the rocks say that the area was once under the sea or that extra terrestrials made them. The rocks are over 65 million years old formed by volcanic activity. Since that time, wind, rain and chemical reactions have eroded the rock to leave the current formation, some of which are up to twenty meters tall. Most of the rock structures can be reached on foot. A number of the formations resemble humans, columns, portals, castles, monsters and animals. Piedras Encimadas offers camping, extreme sports and horseback riding.

The Los Jilgueros Ravine is located near the community of Atmatla, about three km from the municipal seat. It is an area of pine forests traversed by the San Pedro River which has cut a small canyon which is up to 400 meters deep. The ravine has a number of features such as the Espinazo del Diablo (Devil's Spine), the Balcon de la Primavera (Spring Balcony) and on the west side the Balcon del Diablo (Devil's Balcony) which offers views of the large rock outcroppings which resemble human figures, called Los Frailes (The Friars). It also contains the San Pedro waterfall, which has a height of about twenty meters. It is possible to swim her.

== Economy ==
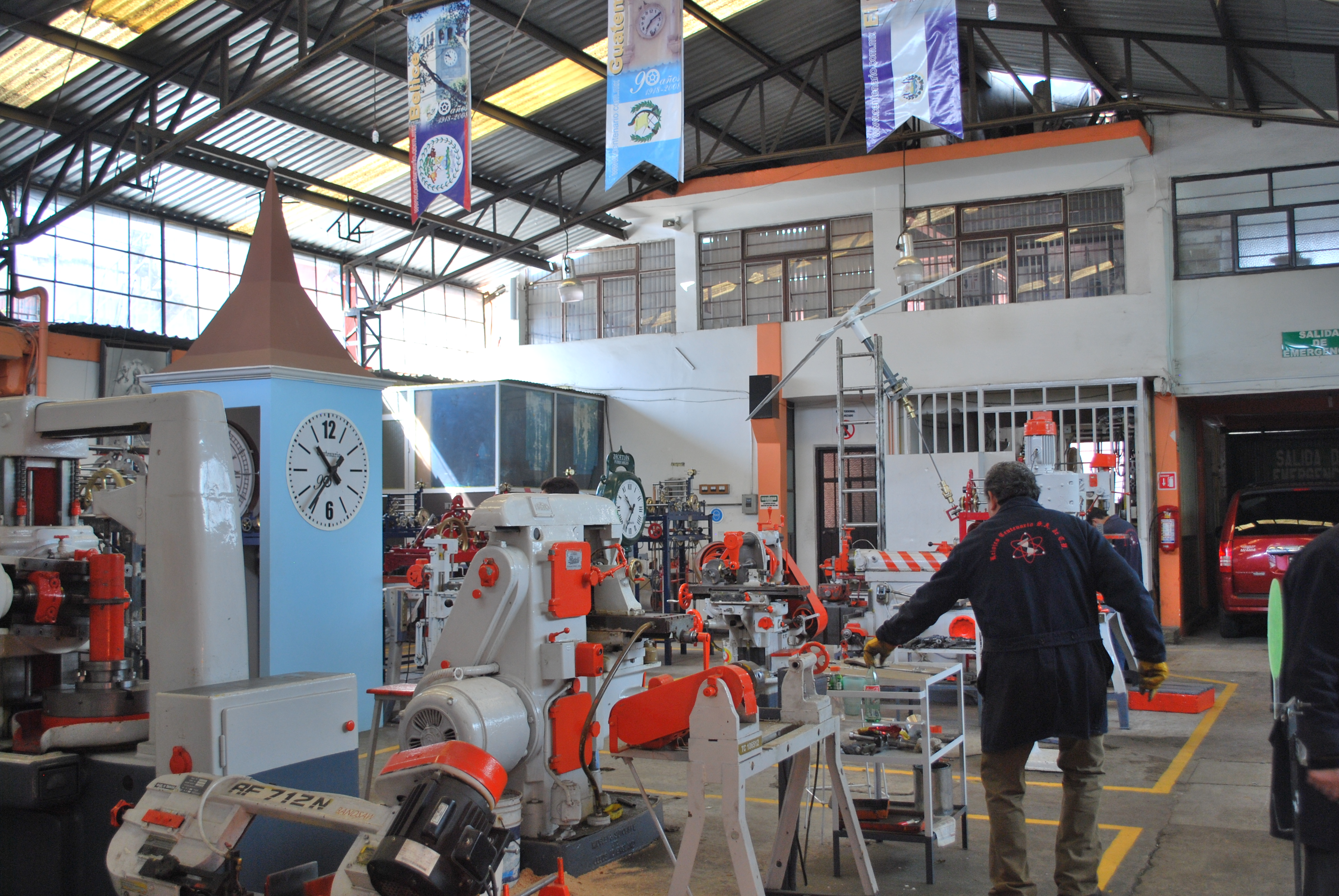
Factory floor at Centenario Clock

It is considered to have a high level of socioeconomic marginalization. There are 15,231 residential units in the municipality. Most have wooden walls and cement floors, with roofs of clay tile or block/brick. All but about a thousand are owned by their occupants. Basic services such are running water, electricity and sewerage are most common in the municipal seat, with a number of communities lacking sewerage, public lighting and garbage collection. The economy of the rural areas depends on agriculture and migration to other places to work.

Most of the municipality is dedicated to agriculture primarily the production of beans, corn, fava beans, wheat, apples, plums, peaches, pears and walnuts. Other important crops include potatoes, garlic, barley and animal feed. The area has been a major producer of apples since 1600. Lately, this production has fallen due to the lack of advanced cultivation methods. The city is surrounded by an estimated 700,000 apple trees, 300,000 plum trees and 150,000 pear trees. Livestock mostly consists of cattle and sheep for wool, with some mules and domestic fowl. Various communities have fishing and fish farming especially Xoxanacatla and Tepeixco which produce trout and carp. There is also some beekeeping as well. Loggable tree species are mostly harvested for the manufacture of furniture and construction materials. These activities employ 47.2% of the working population.

Most industry is in small factories and workshops producing apple cider and other fruit wines, pottery, fireworks, coffee processing and breads. The best known factory is the Centenario Clock in the municipal seat. The making of fruit wines and dried fruits are an important supplement to agriculture. Fruit wine includes one called Fourteen Tortillas, made with herbs. Zacatlán processes about 10,000 tons of apples to make cider, with about eighty percent sold in December for the holidays. Most of it is sold in central and southern Mexico. The making of cider here is dominated by four companies which employs forty families directly but has an indirect economic benefit to 200 families involved in apple growing, and commercialization of the product. Handcrafts include the making of sarapes, overcoats, quexquémetls, wood utensils and pottery. The community of San Miguel Tenango is noted for its production of ixtle items. Although the neighboring municipality of Chignahuapan is more famous for its glass Christmas ornaments, Zacatlán makes them as well. The main producer is the Martínez Luna family, which creates spheres in various shapes, sizes and colors. There are ten other workshops in the city. There are deposits of minerals such as manganese, iron calcite, phosphorus, zinc, quartz, feldspar, gold, silver, lead, copper and antimony. These activities employ 17.9% of the working population.

There are two weekly tianguis markets one traditional fixed market and 724 commercial establishments. Most commerce and services in the municipality relate to meeting local needs but there is a small tourism industry, mostly concentrated in the municipal seat along with the Valley of the Piedras Encimadas. Tourism outside of the municipal seat is related to ecotourism. Piedras Encimadas offers camping, extreme sports and horseback riding. The Tulimán waterfall area recreational facilities such as cabins, palapas and a zip line. Commerce, services and tourism employ 31.5% of the working population.
