= Tepetzintla, Puebla =

Coordinates: 19.9667°N 97.8333°W

Tepetzintla
- Municipality and town
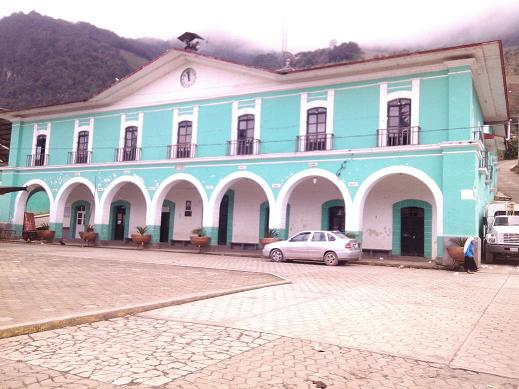
- Interactive map of Tepetzintla
- Country: Mexico
- State: Puebla
- Time zone: UTC-6 (Zona Centro)

Tepetzintla is a town and municipality in the Mexican state of Puebla.
