= Ahuacatlán Municipality, Puebla =

Municipality in the Mexican state of Puebla

Coordinates: 20.0047°N 97.8536°W

Ahuacatlán
- Municipality
- Coat of arms

- Location in Mexico Ahuacatlán (Mexico)
- Country: Mexico
- State: Puebla
- Demonym: (in Spanish)
- Time zone: UTC−6 (CST)

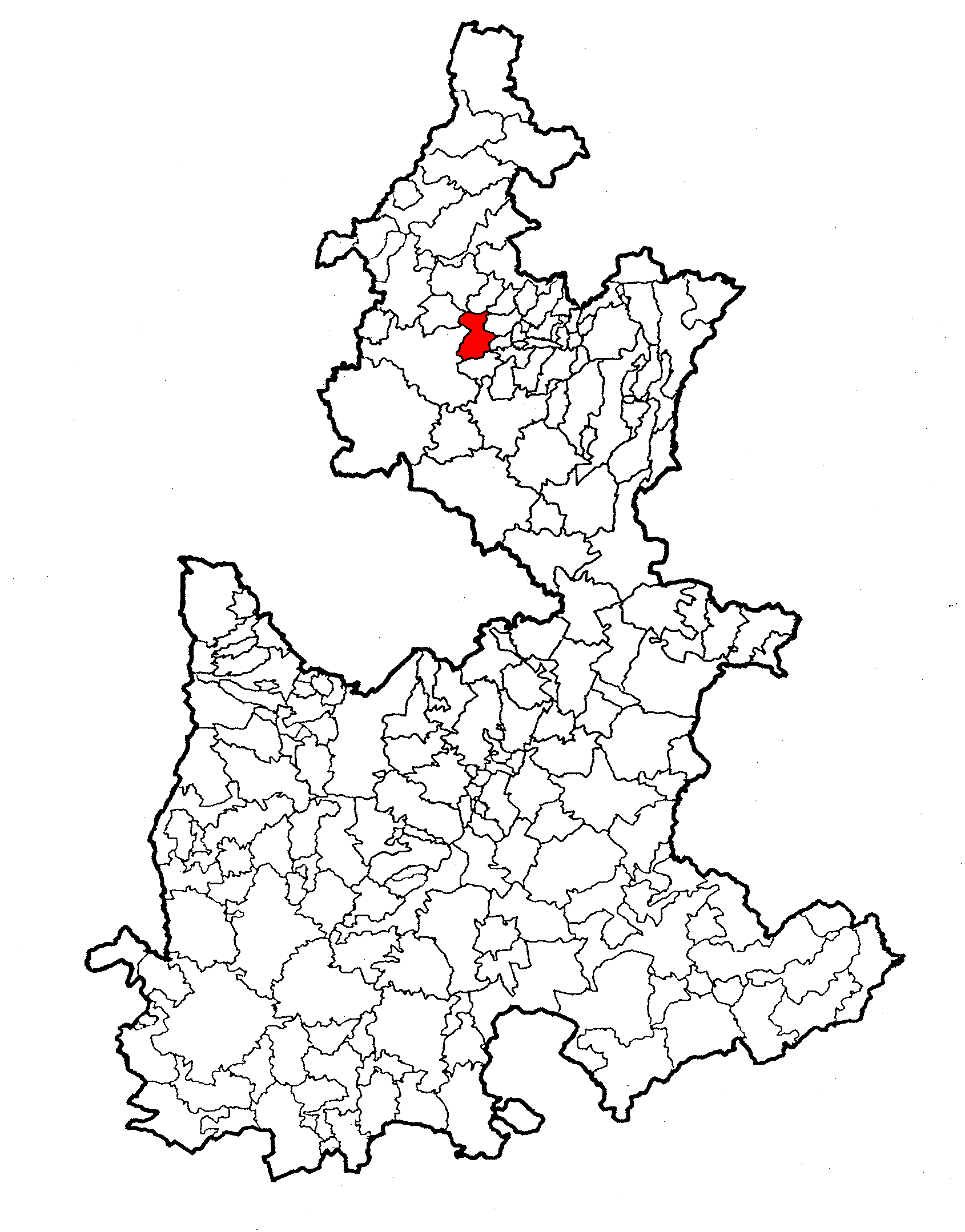
Location of Ahuacatlán in Puebla

Ahuacatlán Municipality is a municipio (municipality) located in the Sierra Norte region of the Mexican state of Puebla. The seat of the ayuntamiento (municipal government) is the town of Ahuacatlán. The municipality is located in the northeastern portion of Puebla, approximately 124 km (77.1 mi) to the north of the state capital, the city of Puebla. Ahuacatlán has an area of some 94.4 km^{2}, and according to INEGI figures had a 2005 population of 13,745 inhabitants.

The name comes from the Nahuatl ahuacatl ("avocado") and tlan ("place"): it thus means "place of avocados".
