= Aguilar (surname) =

Aguilar is a Spanish surname. Notable people with the surname include:

- Abel Aguilar (born 1985), Colombian footballer
- Alberto Aguilar (disambiguation), several people
- Alejandro Aguilar (disambiguation), several people
- Alfredo Aguilar (born 1988), Paraguayan footballer
- Amalia Aguilar (1924–2021), Cuban and Mexican film actress and dancer in the 1940s and 1950s
- Américo Aguiar (born 1973), Portuguese Catholic cardinal
- Andrés Aguilar Mawdsley (1924–1995), Venezuelan lawyer and diplomat
- Annette A. Aguilar (born 1957), American percussionist, bandleader, and educator
- Antonio Aguilar Barraza (1919–2007), Mexican singer
- António Aguilar (rugby union) (born 1978), Portuguese rugby player
- Belmer Aguilar (born 1973), Colombian footballer
- Carlene Aguilar (born 1982), Filipino actress and former beauty queen
- Carlos Aguilar (born 1988), American soccer player
- Cynthia Aguilar–Villar (born 1950), Filipina politician
- Christina Aguilar (born 1966), Thai pop singer
- Daniel Aguilar (born 1998), Mexican footballer
- Danny Aguilar (born 1986), Colombian footballer
- Baron Diego Pereira d'Aguilar (1699–1759), Spanish Marrano
- Domingo Omar Aguilar Cardenas (born 1959), Chilean long-distance runner
- Edwin Aguilar (born 1985), Panamanian footballer
- Elías Aguilar (born 1991), Costa Rican footballer
- Elisa Aguilar (born 1976), Spanish women's basketball player
- Emanuel Abraham Aguilar (1824–1904), English composer and concert pianist, brother of Grace Aguilar
- Enrique Aguilar (footballer) (born 2007), Swiss footballer
- Ephraim Lópes Pereira d'Aguilar, 2nd Baron d'Aguilar (1739–1802)
- Eugenio Aguilar (1804–1879), President of El Salvador 1846–1848
- Everard F. Aguilar (1913–1966), Jamaican horticulturist and philatelist
- Felipe Aguilar (born 1974), Chilean golfer
- Florencio Flores Aguilar (c. 1931–2020), Panamanian army officer
- Francis J. Aguilar, American scholar of strategic management
- Francisco de Aguilar (conquistador) (1479–c. 1571), Spanish conquistador and later Dominican friar
- Francisco de Aguilar (politician) (19th century), Acting President of Honduras 1855–1856
- Francisco Javier Aguilar García (1949–2020), Spanish footballer
- Freddie Aguilar (1953–2025), Filipino Pinoy rock musician and singer-songwriter
- Gabriel Aguilar (born 1987), Bolivian footballer
- Gerónimo de Aguilar (1489–c. 1531), 16th-century Spanish conquistador and translator for Hernán Cortés
- Gloria Aguilar (born 1990), Guatemalan footballer
- Gonzalo Aguilar (born 1987), Uruguayan footballer
- Grace Aguilar (1816–1847), English novelist, sister of Emanuel Abraham Aguilar
- Guen Garlejo Aguilar (born 1976), Filipino convicted killer and former maid
- Iván Aguilar (born 1991), Spanish footballer
- Japeth Aguilar (born 1987), Filipino basketball player
- Jessica Aguilar (born 1982), Mexican American mixed martial artist
- Jesús Aguilar (born 1990), Venezuelan professional baseball player
- Joel Aguilar (born 1975), Salvadoran football referee
- Joey Aguilar (born 2001), American football player
- Jorge Aguilar, Venezuelan singer and composer
- Jorge Aguilar (born 1985), Chilean tennis player
- Jorge Aguilar (footballer) (born 1993), Paraguayan footballer
- Jorman Aguilar (born 1994), Panamanian footballer
- José Aguilar (baseball) (born 1990), Mexican baseball player
- José Aguilar (boxer) (1958–2014), Cuban boxer
- José Aguilar (footballer) (born 2001), Spanish footballer
- José Aguilar Álvarez (1902–1959), Mexican physician
- José Alberto Aguilar Iñárritu (born 1954), Mexican politician
- José Alejandro Aguilar López (born 1963), Mexican politician
- José Antonio Aguilar Bodegas (born 1949), Mexican politician
- José Marcos Aguilar Moreno (born 1935), Mexican politician
- José Óscar Aguilar González (born 1957), Mexican politician
- Josefina Aguilar (contemporary), Mexican folk artist
- Juan Aguilar (footballer) (born 1989), Paraguayan footballer
- Juan Fernando López Aguilar (born 1961), Spanish politician and government minister
- Juan Martínez de Jáuregui y Aguilar (1583–1641), Spanish poet
- Julio Aguilar (born 1986), Paraguayan footballer
- Kluiverth Aguilar (born 2003), Peruvian footballer
- Lorena Aguilar (born 1985), Ecuadorian footballer
- Luis Aguilar (soccer) (born 1984), American soccer defender
- Luis Aguilar (actor) (1918–1997), Mexican actor and singer
- Luis A. Aguilar (contemporary), commissioner of the U.S. Securities and Exchange Commission
- Luis Aguilar Monsalve (born 1942), Ecuadorian writer, critic, and professor
- Pedro Pablo Aguilar, Venezuelan politician
- Macarena Aguilar (born 1985), Spanish handballer
- Manuel Aguilar (disambiguation)
- Mario Aguilar (disambiguation)
- Miguel Aguilar (Bolivian footballer) (born 1953), Bolivian footballer
- Miguel Aguilar (Salvadoran footballer) (born 1953), Salvadoran footballer and coach
- Miguel Aguilar (baseball) (born 1991), Mexican baseball player
- Miguel Aguilar (Mexican footballer) (born 1993), Mexican footballer
- Miguel Ángel Aguilar Miranda (1939–2025), Ecuadorian Roman Catholic bishop
- Mila D. Aguilar (contemporary), Filipina poet and revolutionary
- Natasha Aguilar (born 1970), Costa Rican freestyle swimmer
- Pablo Aguilar (disambiguation)
- Paul Aguilar (born 1986), Mexican footballer
- Pedro Pablo Aguilar, Venezuelan politician
- Pepe Aguilar (born 1968), Mexican-American singer-songwriter
- Pepe Aguilar (footballer) (born 1970), Spanish footballer
- Rafael Aguilar Talamantes (1940–2016), Mexican politician
- Rafael María de Aguilar y Ponce de León, Spanish military officer and 56th Governor-General of the Philippines
- Rafael Manzanares Aguilar (1918–1999), Honduran folklorist, author and composer
- Robert Aguilar (1931–2020), former U.S. federal judge
- Roberto Ivan Aguilar Gomez (contemporary), Bolivian politician
- Ronnie Aguilar (born 1987), American basketball player
- Rose Aguilar (contemporary), Californian broadcaster and journalist
- Rotceh Aguilar (born 2001), Peruvian footballer
- Ruben Aguilar (born 1993), French footballer
- Ryan Aguilar (born 1994), American baseball player
- Samuel Aguilar (1933–2013), Paraguayan footballer
- Slick Aguilar (born 1954), American guitarist
- Teresa Aguilar Suro (1931–2017), Mexican painter
- Zach Aguilar (born 1998), American voice actor

== Families ==
- Aguilar Family, early 20th century Native American potters from New Mexico

== See also ==
- Aguiar, Portuguese variant
