= José Aguilar =

José Aguilar may refer to:

- José Aguilar (baseball) (born 1990), Mexican baseball player
- José Aguilar (boxer) (1958–2014), Cuban boxer
- José Aguilar (footballer) (born 2001), Spanish footballer
- José Aguilar Álvarez (1902–1959), Mexican physician
- José Alberto Aguilar Iñárritu (born 1954), Mexican politician
- José Alejandro Aguilar López (born 1963), Mexican politician
- José Antonio Aguilar Bodegas (born 1949), Mexican politician
- José Marcos Aguilar Moreno (born 1934), Mexican politician
- José Óscar Aguilar González (born 1957), Mexican politician
- Pepe Aguilar, real name José Antonio Aguilar Jiménez (born 1968), Mexican-American singer-songwriter
- Jose Vasquez Aguilar (1900–1980), first Filipino recipient of the Ramon Magsaysay Award
