= 4th federal electoral district of Puebla =

Federal electoral district of Mexico

Puebla's 4th
- Electoral district of the Chamber of Deputies of Mexico

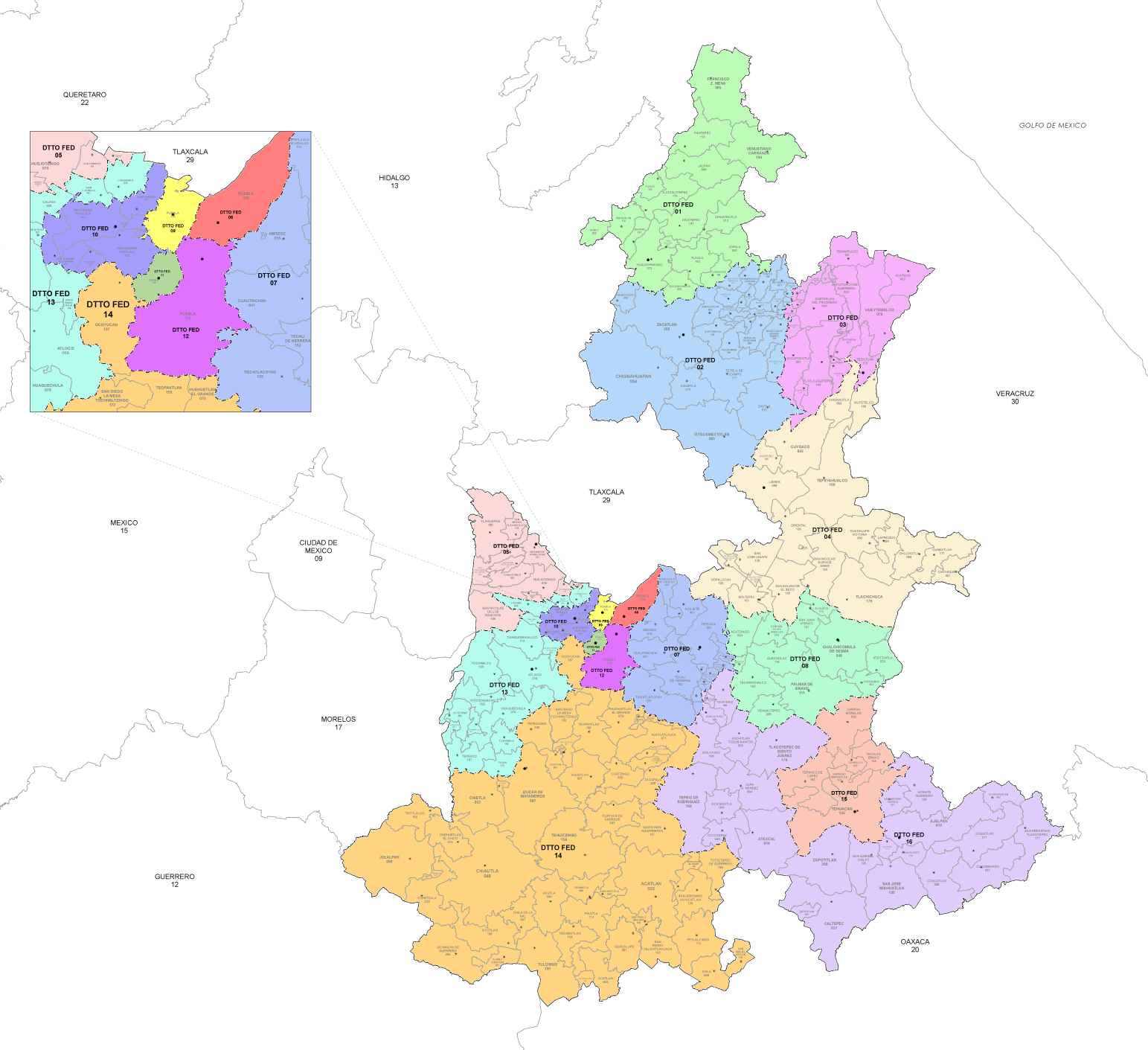
- 4th district since 2023

Incumbent
- Member: Juan Antonio González
- Party: ▌Morena
- Congress: 66th (2024–2027)

District
- State: Puebla
- Head town: Libres
- Coordinates: 19°28′N 97°41′W
- Covers: 20 municipalities: Chichiquila, Chignautla, Chilchotla, Cuyoaco, Guadalupe Victoria, Lafragua, Libres, Mazapiltepec, Nopalucan, Ocotepec, Oriental, Quimixtlán, Rafael Lara Grajales, San José Chiapa, San Nicolás Buenos Aires, San Salvador el Seco, Soltepec, Tepeyahualco, Tlachichuca, Xiutetelco
- PR region: Fourth
- Precincts: 168
- Population: 423,629 (2020 census)

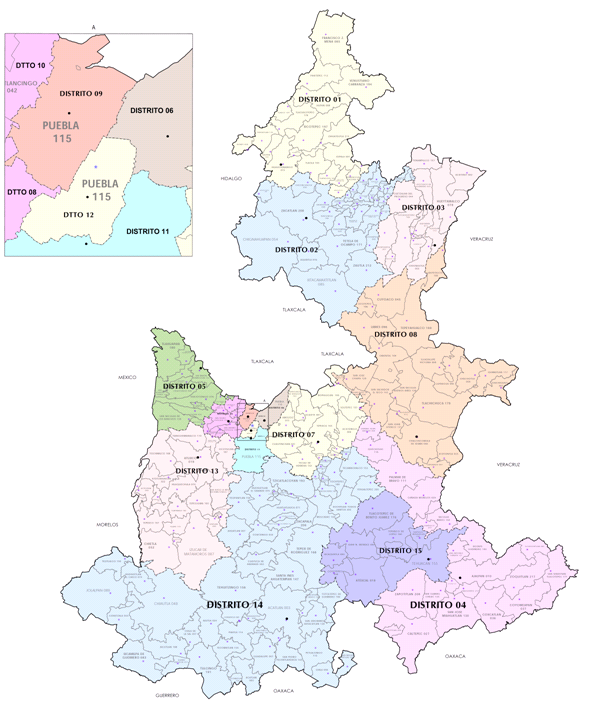
Puebla's districts in 2017–2022

The 4th federal electoral district of Puebla (Spanish: Distrito electoral federal 04 de Puebla) is one of the 300 electoral districts into which Mexico is divided for elections to the federal Chamber of Deputies and one of 16 such districts in the state of Puebla.

It elects one deputy to the lower house of Congress for each three-year legislative session by means of the first-past-the-post system. Votes cast in the district also count towards the calculation of proportional representation ("plurinominal") deputies elected from the fourth region.

The current member for the district, elected in the 2024 general election, is Juan Antonio González Hernández of the National Regeneration Movement (Morena).

== District territory ==
Under the 2023 districting plan adopted by the National Electoral Institute (INE), which is to be used for the 2024, 2027 and 2030 federal elections, Puebla's congressional seat allocation rose from 15 to 16. The 4th district is located between the states of Tlaxcala and Veracruz and covers 168 electoral precincts (secciones electorales) across 20 of Puebla's municipalities:

- Chichiquila, Chignautla, Chilchotla, Cuyoaco, Guadalupe Victoria, Lafragua, Libres, Mazapiltepec, Nopalucan, Ocotepec, Oriental, Quimixtlán, Rafael Lara Grajales, San José Chiapa, San Nicolás Buenos Aires, San Salvador el Seco, Soltepec, Tepeyahualco, Tlachichuca and Xiutetelco.

The head town (cabecera distrital), where results from individual polling stations are gathered together and tallied, is the city of Libres. The district reported a population of 423,629 in the 2020 census.

== Previous districting schemes ==
Evolution of electoral district numbers
| | 1974 | 1978 | 1996 | 2005 | 2017 | 2023 |
|---|---|---|---|---|---|---|
| Puebla | 10 | 14 | 15 | 16 | 15 | 16 |
| Chamber of Deputies | 196 | 300 | | | | |

2017–2022

From 2017 to 2022, when Puebla was assigned 15 congressional seats, the district's head town was at Ajalpan in the south-east of the state and it covered 20 municipalities.

2005–2017

Under the 2005 plan, the district was one of 16 in Puebla. Its head town was at Zacapoaxtla in the state's Sierra Norte and it covered 34 municipalities.

1996–2005

Between 1996 and 2005, Puebla had 15 districts. The 4th covered 17 municipalities, with its head town at Libres.

1978–1996

The districting scheme in force from 1978 to 1996 was the result of the 1977 electoral reforms, which increased the number of single-member seats in the Chamber of Deputies from 196 to 300. Under that plan, Puebla's seat allocation rose from 10 to 14. The district's head town was at Atlixco in the west of the state and it covered 17 municipalities.

== Deputies returned to Congress ==
(Mexico) National parties
- Current
- PAN
- PRI
- PT
- PVEM
- MC
- Morena
- PAZ
- Somos
- Defunct or local only
- PLM
- PNR
- PRM
- PNM
- PP
- PPS
- PARM
- PFCRN
- CON
- PANAL
- PSD
- PES
- PES
- PRD

Puebla's xth district
| Election | Deputy | Party | Term | Legislature |
|---|---|---|---|---|
| 1916 | Gabriel Rojano | | 1916–1917 | Constituent Congress of Querétaro |
...
| 1979 | Eleazar Camarillo Ochoa | Institutional Revolutionary Party | 1979–1982 | 51st Congress |
| 1982 | Lino García Gutiérrez | Institutional Revolutionary Party | 1982–1985 | 52nd Congress |
| 1985 | Eleazar Camarillo Ochoa | Institutional Revolutionary Party | 1985–1988 | 53rd Congress |
| 1988 | Serafín Sánchez Campos | Institutional Revolutionary Party | 1988–1991 | 54th Congress |
| 1991 | Eleazar Camarillo Ochoa | Institutional Revolutionary Party | 1991–1994 | 55th Congress |
| 1994 | José Luis Galeazzi Berra | National Action Party (Mexico) | 1994–1997 | 56th Congress |
| 1997 | José Óscar Aguilar González | Institutional Revolutionary Party | 1997–2000 | 57th Congress |
| 2000 | Víctor Emanuel Díaz Palacios | Institutional Revolutionary Party | 2000–2003 | 58th Congress |
| 2003 | José Porfirio Alarcón Hernández | Institutional Revolutionary Party | 2003–2006 | 59th Congress |
| 2006 | Wenceslao Herrera Coyac | Institutional Revolutionary Party | 2006–2009 | 60th Congress |
| 2009 | José Óscar Aguilar González | Institutional Revolutionary Party | 2009–2012 | 61st Congress |
| 2012 | Josefina García Hernández | Institutional Revolutionary Party | 2012–2015 | 62nd Congress |
| 2015 | Hugo Alejo Domínguez | National Action Party (Mexico) | 2015–2018 | 63rd Congress |
| 2018 | Inés Parra Juárez | National Regeneration Movement | 2018–2021 | 64th Congress |
| 2021 | Inés Parra Juárez | National Regeneration Movement | 2021–2024 | 65th Congress |
| 2024 | Juan Antonio González Hernández | National Regeneration Movement | 2024–2027 | 66th Congress |

== Presidential elections ==
Puebla's 4th district
| Election | District won by | Party or coalition | % |
|---|---|---|---|
| 2018 | Andrés Manuel López Obrador | Juntos Haremos Historia | 56.3626 |
| 2024 | Claudia Sheinbaum Pardo | Sigamos Haciendo Historia | 67.2195 |
