= Olinia (automobile) =

Mexican automotive project

- Type: State ownership; Public–private
- Industry: Automotive; Renewable energy
- Founded: October 2, 2024; 2 years ago in Mexico City, Mexico
- Founder: Claudia Sheinbaum
- Owner: Mexican Government

Olinia (literally from Nahuatl: move) is a Mexican automotive project to the production of city-electric cars and create a completely Mexican electric carmaker. The project was originally announced on October 2, 2024 at the first "mañanera" of Claudia Sheinbaum, and announced again at a press conference on January 6, 2025 as part of the "Mexico Plan 2025" project, aimed at a long-term plan for the country's regional development, promoting relocation, relaunching the "Hecho en México" (Made in Mexico) brand and creating jobs.

This is latest attempt at government involvement in the automotive industry in Mexico, following on from the defunct VAM and FAMSA and the privatized DINA, with the goal of creating a modern car manufacturer alongside brands such as Zacua and Giant Motors. The estimated price of the cars varies between 90 and 150 thousand pesos, and will consist of three models dedicated to two, four passengers and a van.

== Design and development ==
Presentation of Olinia at the Felipe Ángeles International Airport on June 2026.

The project was originally announced on October 2, 2024, one day after the presidential inauguration of Claudia Sheinbaum as the 66th president of Mexico in her first "mañanera" as part of the long-term plan for the Mexican economy known as "Mexico Plan 2025". On January 6, 2025, the project was announced again at a press conference now with the concepts of the three vehicles, the vehicles will be in charge of the National Technological Institute of Mexico and Instituto Politécnico Nacional for the R&D, supported by the CONACyT, coordinated by Secretariat of Science, Humanities, Technology and Innovation and public and private investment, the project would be led by Roberto Capuano Tripp, as the project coordinator.

The purpose of these vehicles is; "This small car must be safe, electric, pluggable, and have most of its components made in Mexico. So, little by little, we'll build this production chain”. In 2025, 25 million pesos would be invested to develop the car, to be ready in 2026 in the year of the World Cup until the end of the Claudia Sheinbaum six-year term.

President Claudia Sheinbaum drives a Olinia during a presentation on June 2026.

The design of the cars follows the urban car line, the three main models; Movilidad Personal (Personal Mobility), Movilidad de Barrio (Neighborhood Mobility), Entregas de Última Milla (Last Mile Deliveries), will have space for two (in the case of a personal vehicle and van) and four passengers, as well as having lithium-ion batteries and be adapted to any plug.

The production plant was estimated to be between Puebla, State of Mexico, and Sonora as the most likely for construction, although Puebla was finally decided, with the possibility of being located in San José Chiapa, the same location where the Audi plant is located. In March, a visit is scheduled in April to Ciudad Sahagún, in the municipality of Apan, Hidalgo, to evaluate the plant in this community, which already has the DINA and Giant Motors plants. It was later announced that the plant would be located in Puebla, next to the Puebla Technological Institute in the La Ciénega Industrial Corridor, which will cover an area of just over 400 square meters and 150 more meters for practice maneuvers for the car that was planned to be presented at the opening match of the 2026 World Cup, in January 2026 the president announced that the car would be delayed for the first trimester of 2027. On 13 May 2026, it was announced that the Olinia would debut 7 June. Following its debut, its design received comparisons to Matrix 01, a Chinese battery electric vehicle.

== Products ==
- Movilidad Personal, a microcar for two people, dedicated to young people, housewives, and people who are considering buying a motorcycle.
- Movilidad de Barrio, four-passenger city car, for the rickshaw sector as a safe, quiet and comfortable alternative.
- Entregas de Última Milla, a panel van, efficient for the growing demand for online commerce and SME shipments.
