= Samuel Ramírez =

Samuel Ramirez or Ramírez may refer to:

- Samuel Ramírez Moreno (1898–1951), Mexican psychiatrist and academic
- Samuel A. Ramirez Sr. (born 1941), Puerto Rican investment banker
