= Suro (surname) =

Suro is a Spanish surname. Notable people with the surname include:

- Darío Suro (1917–1997), Dominican painter, art critic, and diplomat f
- Mbah Suro (1921–1967), Indonesian shaman, mystic, Sukarnoist, and village head
- Teresa Aguilar Suro (1931–2017), Mexican watercolorist, painter, and gallery director
