= Aguiar =

Aguiar is a surname of Galician-Portuguese origin. Its etymology comes from the Latin word aquilare, translating to "eagle's nest".

Notable people with the surname include:

- Antone S. Aguiar Jr. (1930–2014), American judge and politician
- Bruno Aguiar, Portuguese footballer
- Domingos Malaquias de Aguiar Pires Ferreira, 1st Baron of Cimbres (1788–1859), Brazilian businessman and politician
- Ernani Aguiar, Brazilian composer, choral conductor, and musicologist
- Fernando Aguiar, Portuguese-born Canadian soccer player
- Flávio Aguiar (born 1947), Brazilian writer
- Guma Aguiar, Brazilian-born American energy industrialist
- Henry Aguiar (born 1966), Venezuelan sprinter
- Inês Aguiar (born 1998), Portuguese actress
- João Aguiar (writer) (1943–2010), Portuguese writer and journalist
- João Aguiar (swimmer) (born 1983), Angolan swimmer
- Joaquim António de Aguiar, Portuguese politician
- Joselia Aguiar, Brazilian writer
- Luis Aguiar, Uruguayan footballer

== See also ==
- Aguiar (Barcelos), a civil parish in the municipality of Barcelos
- Aguiar, Paraíba, a municipality in the state of Paraíba
- Aguilar (surname), Spanish variant
