= Manuel Gual =

Manuel Gual may refer to:

- Manuel Gual (conspirator) (1759–1800), Venezuelan politician and soldier, instigator of the Gual and España conspiracy
- Manuel Gual Vidal (1903–1954), Mexican academic and politician
