= Grajales =

Grajales is a surname. Notable people with the surname include:

- Antonio Maceo Grajales (1845–1896), Cuban lieutenant general
- Crisanto Grajales (born 1987), Mexican triathlete
- Fidel Kuri Grajales (born 1962), Mexican businessman and politician
- Francisco Grajales Palacios (born 1956), Mexican politician
- Julieta Grajales (born 1986), Mexican actress
- Mariana Grajales Cuello (1808–1893), Cuban women's rights activist
- Pedro Grajales (born 1940), Colombian sprinter
- Rafael Lara Grajales (revolutionary), Mexican general
