= Gual (surname) =

Gual is a Spanish surname. Notable people with the surname include:

- Adrià Gual (1872–1943), Spanish playwright
- Anna Gual (born 1996), Spanish water polo player
- Jordi Gual (born 1957), Spanish economist
- José Costas Gual (1918–2011), Spanish astronomer
- Manuel Gual (conspirator) (1759–1800), Venezuelan politician and soldier, instigator of the Gual and España conspiracy
- Manuel Gual Vidal (1903–1954), Mexican academic and politician
- Marc Gual (born 1996), Spanish footballer
- Miguel Gual (1919–2010), Spanish racing cyclist
- Miguel Gual Agustina (1911–1989), Spanish footballer
- Orlando Requeijo Gual (fl. 2004–2006), Cuban diplomat
- Pedro Mairata Gual (born 1979), Spanish footballer
- Pedro Gual Escandón (1783–1862), Venezuelan politician

== See also ==
- Gual (disambiguation)
