= Los Humeros =

Mexican volcano

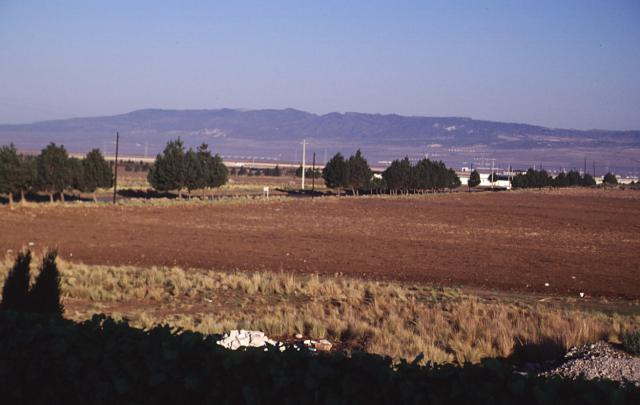

Highest point
- Elevation: 3,150 m (10,330 ft)
- Coordinates: 19°41′N 97°27′W

Geography
- Location within Puebla (state) Location within Mexico
- Location: Chignautla, Puebla, Mexico

Geology
- Mountain type: Caldera
- Volcanic belt: Trans-Mexican Volcanic Belt
- Last eruption: 4470 BCE

Los Humeros is a volcanic caldera located in the municipality of Chignautla in the east of the Mexican state of Puebla. It measures 21 by 15 km (13.0 by 9.3 mi) and is located about 180 km (110 mi) east of Mexico City. The volcano has a history of very explosive eruptions as recent as 6.4 ka, and intermittent lava flows.

== Local geology ==
The basement where the volcanic center formed comprise Paleozoic plutonic and metasedimentary rocks of the Teziutlán Massif. Overlying this basement is a Mesozoic sequence of carbonated and terrigenous sediments of the Sierra Madre Oriental with intrusions of granite and syenite during the Eocene and Oligocene. A 1.5 km (0.93 mi) thick andesite lava flow from the Pliocene (2.6–1.4 Ma) covers the Mesozoic sequence.

== Caldera formations ==
Volcanic activity associated with Los Humeros began with the formation of rhyolitic lava and domes at the present-day south and western margins of the caldera. Argon–argon dating suggest rhyolitic lava eruptions occurred about between 693 and 270 ka. After a long period of pre-caldera activity, the Xaltipan eruption marked the first explosive phase. It generated ignimbrite which was caused by mobilizing at least 115 m^{3} (4,100 cu ft) of magma. Detrital zircon geochronology and argon–argon dating indicated an age of 164 ka. This eruption had a dense-rock equivalent volume of 290 km^{3} (70 cu mi), making it the largest eruption from a volcano in the Trans-Mexican Volcanic Belt, and earning a rating of 6 or 7 on the volcanic explosivity index.

This eruption, possibly the most explosive in Quaternary Mexico, generated pyroclastic flows that covered a 3,500 km^{2} (1,400 sq mi) region. To the northeast, these flows travelled 50 km (31 mi) along canyons that rising 600 m (2,000 ft) above the plains before reaching present-day Xalapa. In the south and southwest areas, the flows traverse relatively flat areas. The Sierra de Tlaxco acted as a barrier for the flows to propagate further west, but several passes 100 m (330 ft) above the plain allowed them to flow through, where they later entered canyons of the Apulco and Tehuantepec rivers. This eruption led to a caldera collapse; while younger eruptions have partially buried some parts of the caldera margins, it is thought to have a dimension of 21 by 15 km (13.0 by 9.3 mi).

Post-caldera rhyolite domes formed. This was followed by formation of the Faby tuff at 70 ka; a Plinian eruption that produced a layer of andesitic and eight layers of rhyolitic air-fall tuffs. Each layer range in thickness of 1 to 3.5 m (3 ft 3 in to 11 ft 6 in). The eruption producing the Faby tuff represented 10 km^{3} (2.4 cu mi) of magma. At the caldera rim, the Faby tuff and have a total thickness of about 16 m (52 ft); thinning to 9 m (30 ft) at about 10 km (6.2 mi) east-southeast. These tuffs covered at least 1,000 km^{2} (390 sq mi), based on analyzing outcrops. However, at the boundary of the inferred areas covered, some deposits exceed 1 m (3 ft 3 in) thickness. Thus it is also inferred that one of the layers may have covered a 25,000 km^{2} (9,700 sq mi) area. The erupting vent is interpreted to be in the southeastern part of the caldera as the size of the pumice is largest and layers are thickest there. Despite the amount of ejecta produced, the Faby Tuff eruption did not cause a caldera collapse, possibly because they comprised nine less explosive eruptions rather than a single large-volume eruption, and a very short time required to refill the emptied magma chamber.

The Zaragoza ignimbrite involved erupting 15 km^{3} (3.6 cu mi) of magma at around 69 ka. Most of the volcanic ashfall occurred northeast, although this is poorly constrained. At the eastern caldera rim, the tuff thickness is 2.5 m (8 ft 2 in), but decreases to 2 m (6 ft 7 in) about 15 km (9.3 mi) north. About 95% of the air-deposited material comprise rhyodacitic ash and pumice lapilli. This ignimbrite was distributed around the plains, covering a 1,300 km^{2} (500 sq mi) area, where in some areas, its thickness exceeded 20 m (66 ft). This eruption formed the 10 km (6.2 mi) wide Los Potreros caldera within Los Humeros. Doming occurred east of the Los Potreros caldera, causing andesite lava to erupt.

== Post-caldera activity ==
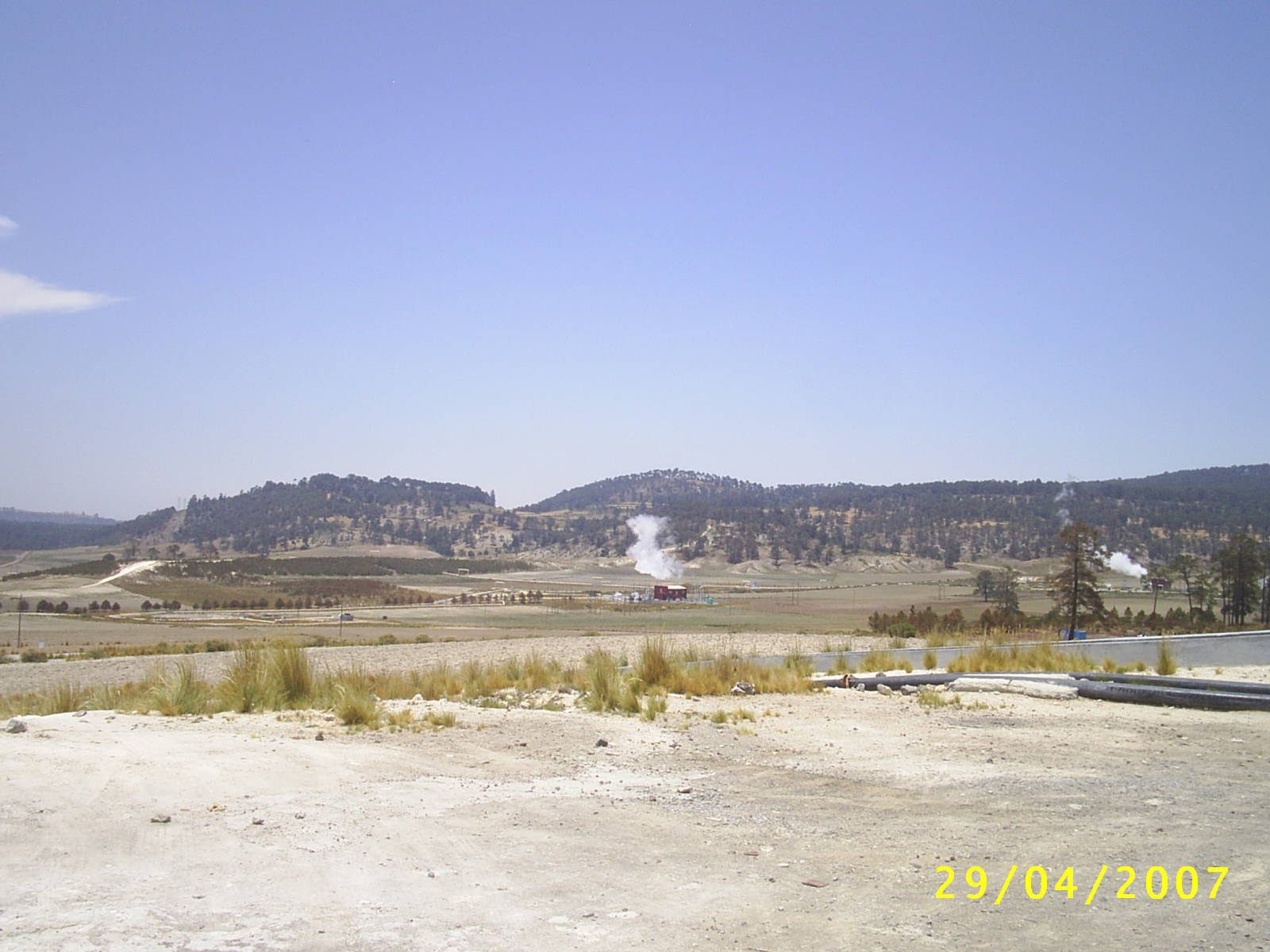
A geothermal power plant inside the caldera floor

Volcanic activity after the caldera formations are characterised by ring fault fractures and bimodal volcanism. At around 44.8 ka, rhyolithic and dacitic magmatic activity occurred in the central caldera. A rhyolitic dome also formed north of Los Humeros. Explosive eruptions continued to produce the Xoxoctic and Llano tuffs which are ash fallout, breccia and pyroclastic deposits no more than 28 ka. Its Holocene eruptions occurred mostly along the caldera rim in the form of andesitic and basaltic andesite flows, and some explosive basaltic and rhyodacitic eruptions; this bimodal phase formed the Cuicuiltic tuff.

The Maztaloya eruption occurred at the northern edge of the caldera rim vents, or southern part of the Los Humeros caldera. During the early stage of this formation, about 0.1 km^{3} (0.024 cu mi) of andesitic magma was ejected as pyroclastic flows to form the Llano ignimbrite. The ignimbrite comprised bombs, scoria blocks, lapilli and ash, and is partially welded to nonwelded. After this eruptive episode, a volcanic mount formed comprising basaltic andesite and andesite lava flows. These products are buried under the Cuicuiltic tuff which are rhyodacitic and andesitic air-deposited tuff that erupted from 0.1 km^{3} (0.024 cu mi) of magma. The Cuicuiltic tuff eruption likely formed the 1.7 km (1.1 mi) wide El Xalapazco caldera. A 2014 analysis of the Cuicuiltic tuff, renamed Cuicuiltic member, suggest it erupted at around 6.4 ka, making it the most recent explosive eruption in the caldera. This eruption was characterised by Plinian and Strombolian activity in a central vent, but also two independent minor vents.

Rhyodacitic and some andesitic lava also erupted at the northern Los Potreros caldera margin just before and during the Cuicuiltic tuff eruption. The earliest lava flows are overlain by the Cuicuiltic tuff. This eruption formed the San Antonio shield volcano, a 9 km^{3} (2.2 cu mi) formation that rises 450 m (1,480 ft) from the Los Potreros caldera floor and spans 55 km^{2} (21 sq mi). San Antonio is characterised by a cluster of vents erupting once or twice. These flows had an average thickness of 30 m (98 ft) and length of 1.5 km (0.93 mi). The older flows were rhyodacite lava. Volcanic activity ended with andesite lava that erupted at the northern and eastern portions of San Antonio. Minor vents continued to erupt small amounts of lava for some time. Three instances of olivine-rich basalt lava eruptions occurred in the Los Potrero and El Xalapazco calderas while another erupted along the Los Humeros ring fault zone. These flows, altogether, have a volume of 0.25 km^{3} (0.060 cu mi). These flows have been dated to 2.8 ka.

A zone of andesitc and basaltic andesite cinder cones formed along the inferred southern Los Humeros caldera margin. These cinder cones erupted 4 km^{3} (0.96 cu mi) of lava that began flowing south of the caldera. These flows, comprising blocky lava, is the result of several individual flows stacked on top each other with each flow unit attaining 10 m (33 ft) in average thickness. About 50 cinder cones can still be identified while a similar number were likely eroded hence have poor topography.
