= Samuel A. Ramirez Sr. =

- Born: 1941 (age 84–85); New York, New York
- Occupations: Founder and President, Ramirez & Co.

Samuel A. Ramirez Sr. (born 1941) made Wall Street history by becoming the first Latino to launch a successful investment banking firm.

== Early years ==
Ramirez's parents moved from Puerto Rico to New York City in the late 1920s in search of a better way of life. They moved to Spanish Harlem where Ramirez was raised and educated. His father worked at the Brooklyn Navy Yard and his mother was a seamstress. After he graduated from high school, he applied for admission to go to college.

Ramirez enrolled in Brooklyn's St. Francis College where he earned his bachelor's degree in Economics in 1965. He barely started college when during his summers he worked for Kidder, Peabody & Co. gaining experience in equity transactions. After he graduated, he went to work for the investment banking firm Stoever Glass & Co. During the years that he worked for Stoever Glass, he became an expert in municipal bonds and earned a reputation amongst the firms clientele as a reliable investor. The experience which Ramirez gained and the satisfaction of helping others to obtain their financial goals motivated him to start his own investment banking firm.

== Ramirez & Co. ==
In 1971, with an investment of $50,000, Ramirez launched his own firm, Ramirez & Co. The company specializes in the distribution of municipal bonds, and provides retail and institutional sales along with investment banking services to corporations and state and local governments. In order to gain recognition and alliances from other firms, Ramirez decided to not make the yet small Hispanic market his primary focus. His reputation of putting an emphasis on the preservation of capital instead of running risks in pursuit of a big payoff, has been a prime factor in his clients entrusting him to $2 Billion dollars of investments. The company established an equity research department focusing on the growing market of Hispanic owned companies. In February 2004, the firm began offering the Ramírez Hispanic Index. The index is set up as an equally weighted Unit Investment Trust (UIT), which means buyers invest equally in the 10 fastest-growing, Hispanic-owned companies in the United States, which include Univision, Banco Popular, and Doral Financial. The company purchased a five percent ownership in AztecAmerica Bank, based in Chicago, Illinois and headed by Carlos X. Montoya. This bank is actively positioning itself as a unique financial services bridge for Latinos.

The firm operates out of eight offices across the United States, on both coasts and in Texas, Chicago, and San Juan, Puerto Rico and has a total of 110 employees. His son Samuel A. Ramirez Jr. is Senior Vice President and the Managing Director of the firm. His daughter Christa, also works for the company and has underwritten new issues and his son-in-law Chris Harpen, is an investment consultant.

== Later years ==
Ramirez's wife, Diane, is the president of Halstead Property, one of Manhattan's largest real estate companies. During his spare time he enjoys playing golf and working out. Samuel A. Ramirez Sr. and his son Samuel A. Ramirez Jr. were featured on the cover of the December 2005/January 2006 issue of Hispanic Trends magazine.

== See also ==
- List of Puerto Ricans
