= Gual =

Gual may refer to:

- Gual (surname), Spanish surname
- Gual (grape), a Spanish wine grape
- A regional name of the Asian fish species Wallago attu

== See also ==
- Pedro Gual Municipality, Venezuela
