= José Alarcón Hernández =

Mexican politician

- Born: 10 March 1945 (age 81); Ciudad Serdán, Puebla, Mexico
- Occupation: Politician
- Political party: PRI (1972–2017)

José Porfirio Alarcón Hernández (born 10 March 1945) is a Mexican politician formerly affiliated with the Institutional Revolutionary Party (PRI).

He has been elected to the Chamber of Deputies on two occasions: in the 1991 mid-terms, to the 55th Congress, for Puebla's 5th district; and in the 2003 mid-terms, to the 59th Congress, for Puebla's 4th district.

In April 2017, Alarcón Hernández was expelled from the PRI for having registered as a candidate for a rival political party.
