= Josefina García Hernández =

Mexican politician

- Born: 25 December 1973 (age 52); Cuacnolapan, Puebla, Mexico
- Occupation: Politician
- Political party: PRI

Josefina García Hernández (born 25 December 1973) is a Mexican politician affiliated with the Institutional Revolutionary Party (PRI). In the 2012 general election she was elected to the Chamber of Deputies to represent Puebla's 4th district during the 62nd session of Congress.
