= Rodulfo Brito Foucher =

Mexican lawyer (1899–1970)

Rodulfo Brito Foucher (1899–1970) was a Mexican lawyer and academic who was rector of the National Autonomous University of Mexico from 1942 to 1944. He was the father of journalist and feminist activist Esperanza Brito de Martí.

He studied at the Juárez Institute of Tabasco and validated his education at Mexico's National Preparatory School. Later, he entered the National School of Jurisprudence, where he obtained his law degree in 1923.

He began teaching in 1927 at the National School of Jurisprudence and in 1929 was appointed professor with chairs in Law and Economics. In 1932, he became director of the school, having had to resign from office due to a conflict over the imposition of socialist education in Mexico.

In 1942, he was appointed rector of the University by its Council. In July 1944, during the college faculty election, a crisis arose in three of the schools of the University, featuring students dissatisfied with the election of their directors. In a University Council meeting, ten directors were re-elected and three were newly appointed. A wave of protests in the three schools ignited a riot that ended with the death of a student. In response, Foucher resigned, presenting a long and passionate speech before the University Council. He died in 1970.

Foucher was preceded as rector by Mario de la Cueva y de la Rosa and succeeded by Samuel Ramírez Moreno.
