= Víctor Emanuel Díaz Palacios =

Mexican politician

- Born: 22 November 1950 (age 75); Puebla, Puebla, Mexico
- Occupation: Politician
- Political party: PRI

Víctor Emanuel Díaz Palacios (born 22 November 1950) is a Mexican politician affiliated with the Institutional Revolutionary Party (PRI).

In the 2000 general election he was elected to the Chamber of Deputies to represent Puebla's 4th district during the 58th session of Congress (2000–2003). Twelve years later, in the 2012 general election, he was elected to the Chamber of Deputies to represent Puebla's 3rd district during the 62nd session of Congress (2012–2015).
