= Manuel Gual Vidal =

Mexican jurist and educator (1903–1954)

Rector of the National Autonomous University of Mexico.
- In office 3 August 1944 – 7 August 1944
- Preceded by: Rodulfo Brito Foucher
- Succeeded by: Alfonso Caso Andrade

Secretary of Public Education
- In office 1946–1952
- President: Miguel Alemán Valdés
- Preceded by: Jaime Torres Bodet
- Succeeded by: José Ángel Ceniceros

Personal details
- Born: 3 August 1903 San Francisco de Campeche, Campeche, Mexico
- Died: 7 August 1954 (aged 51) Federal District, Mexico
- Occupation: Jurist, professor, politician

Manuel Gual Vidal (Note: In this Mexican name, the surname is Gual and the second or maternal family name is Vidal.) (3 August 1903 – 7 August 1954) was a Mexican jurist and educator. In 1944 he briefly served as rector of the National Autonomous University of Mexico (UNAM) and later as secretary of public education.

During his tenure as secretary of public education, he served as president of the second General Conference of UNESCO, which took place in Mexico City from 6 November to 3 December 1947.

== Life ==
Gual Vidal was born in San Francisco de Campeche, Campeche, in 1903. He completed his secondary-school studies at the National Preparatory School in 1918. He studied at the National Law School, and became a lawyer in 1926.

From 1925 he served as an adjunct professor, teaching international law. In 1939 he was elected director of the National Law School, serving until 1941. After his brief service as rector, he temporarily retired from teaching. He joined the cabinet of President Miguel Alemán Valdés as secretary of public education, a post he held throughout the administration (1946–1952).

== Conflict with the University ==
The day after the resignation of Rector Rodulfo Brito Foucher, a group led by Gual, Roberto Medellín Ostos and Raúl Cervantes Ahumada presented to the rectory of the University. They were concerned about the lack of a leader at the University and thus formed the group known as the Directorio, which sought to save the institution and take over the offices.

They convened a meeting on 3 August 1944 at which the University Council appointed a Constituent that proceeded to elect the rector and who would make the necessary reforms.

The council unanimously appointed Manuel Gual as rector. However, just four days later, the President decided to ask both the rector and José Aguilar Álvarez, appointed by the University Council, to resign, as they had been appointed a compromise board (the Board of Former Rectors) which would assume the government of the institution and restore the university organization.

After some resistance, but interested in resolving the conflict, this group of academics, like the one led by Aguilar, obeyed the president's decision and after the resignation of Manuel Gual, delivered the rectory to Board of directors.

== Notes ==
Preceded by Rodulfo Brito Foucher	Rector of the National Autonomous University of Mexico; 1944	Succeeded by Alfonso Caso
