= VAM Lerma =

Luxury cars produced by Vehículos Automotores Mexicanos

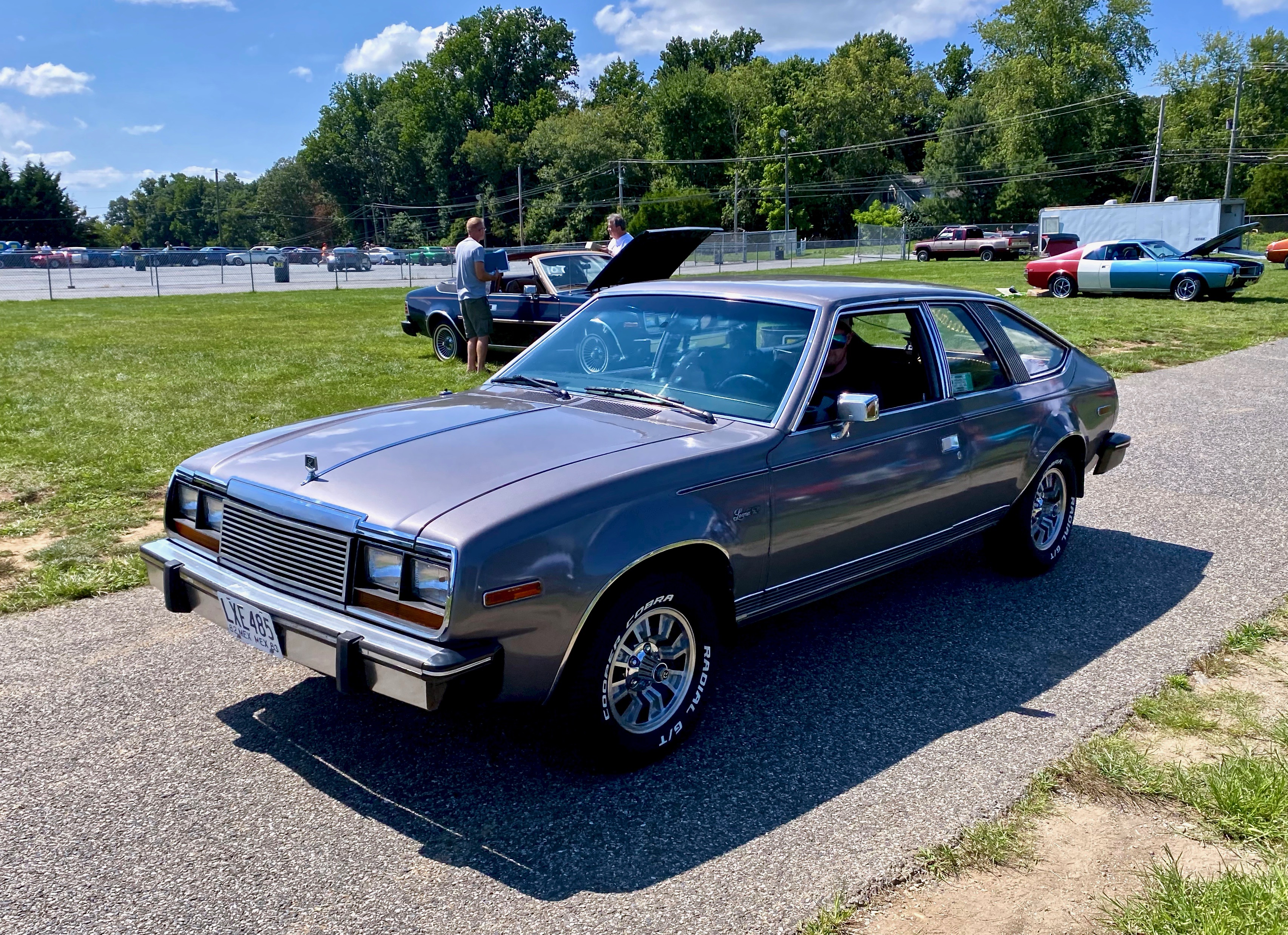
- 1982 VAM Lerma

Overview
- Manufacturer: Vehículos Automotores Mexicanos (VAM)
- Production: 1981–1983
- Assembly: Mexico: Mexico City

Body and chassis
- Class: Compact
- Body style: 2-door hatchback 4-door hatchback
- Layout: FR layout
- Platform: AMC’s "junior cars"
- Related: VAM American; VAM Rally; AMC Concord; AMC Spirit

Powertrain
- Engine: 282 cu in (4.6 L) I6
- Transmission: 3-speed TorqueFlite automatic

Dimensions
- Wheelbase: 108 in (2,743 mm)
- Width: 71 in (1,803 mm)

Chronology
- Predecessor: VAM Classic (AMC Matador)

The VAM Lerma is an automobile that was designed and manufactured by Vehículos Automotores Mexicanos from 1981 through 1983. The Lerma shared parts with other vehicles under VAM's license partner, American Motors Corporation (AMC), to reduce manufacturing costs. It was VAM's top-of-the-line flagship model after the discontinuation of the Classic (Matador) line in 1976. The VAM Lerma was unusual in offering a hatchback design positioned for the luxury market.

== History ==
The name for the cars was taken from Lerma, a city in the state of Mexico, where VAM engines were manufactured.

The Mexican-made Lerma was a unique hybrid since it used a chassis and some body panels from the AMC Concord sedan, but the rear of the car featured the AMC Spirit's hatchback design. The finished Lerma units were single unit body design (monocoque), a British newspaper article described it as "a bolt-together kit of a car". Part of the Lerma production process included hand labor, cutting existing mass production panels, making a single welded unit body.

The two body designs, a two-door and a four-door hatchbacks, of the Lerma were versions not available for any of AMC's models at that time. The designs were presented to AMC's management as a potential model, but it would have less cargo capacity than the Concord wagon and the company had other priorities at the time. Considered for other international markets, the Lerma was marketed only in Mexico starting in 1981, and competed in an expanding market segment that at the time was considered the way of the future, the four-door hatchback market. The Lerma's hatchback design feature also proved to be its biggest drawback, because the built-in closed trunk resulted in a car with a very limited space for storage. between

Arguably, the VAM Lerma was the first successful fully Mexican sedan. Vehículos Automotores Mexicanos is remembered as the first Mexican automotive company to develop a car that is regarded as totally national. Except for the instrument panel, the interior featured specially designed and upholstered seats as well as interior door panels.

== Style and Equipment ==
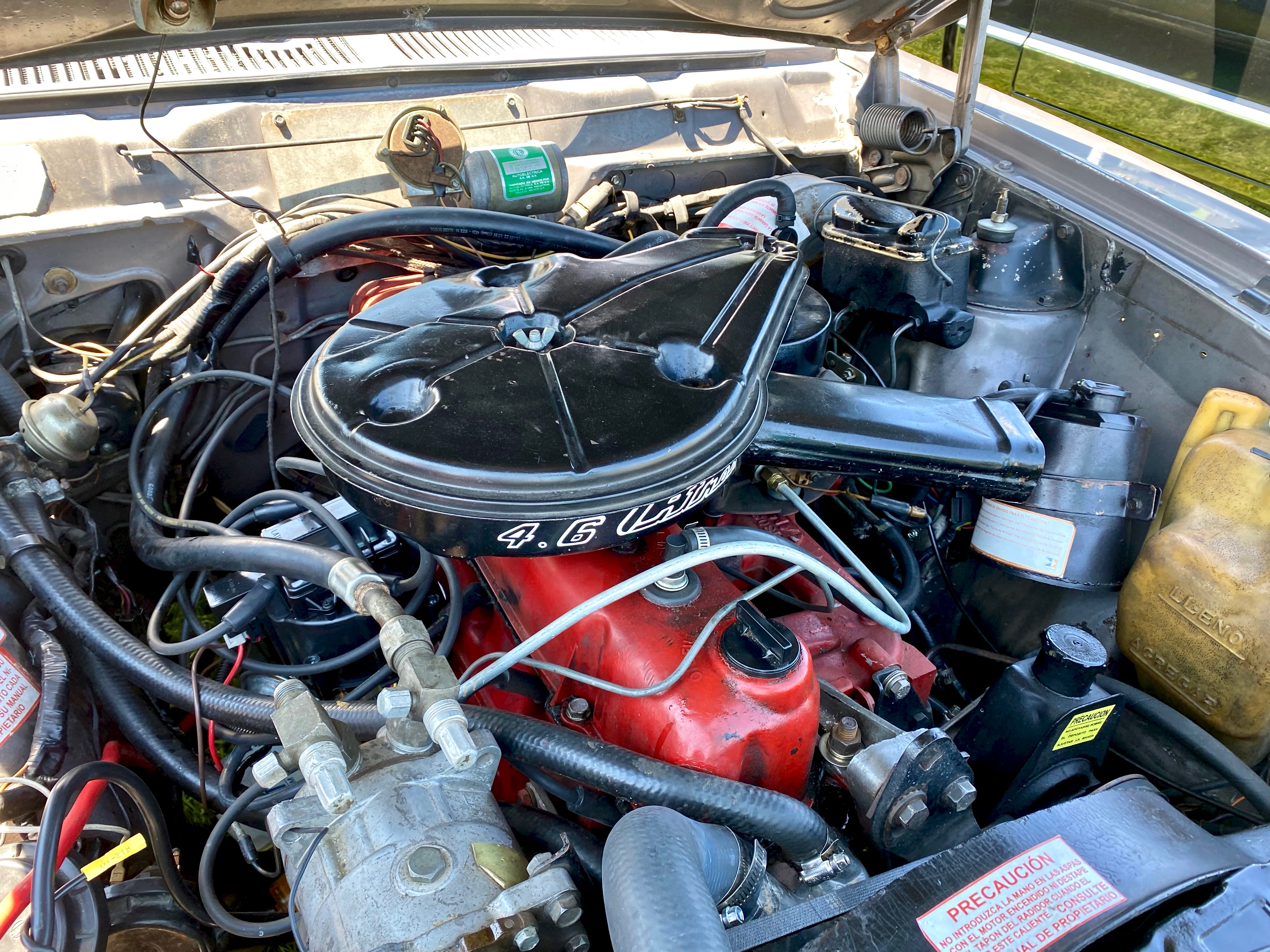
The standard 4.6 L I6 engine

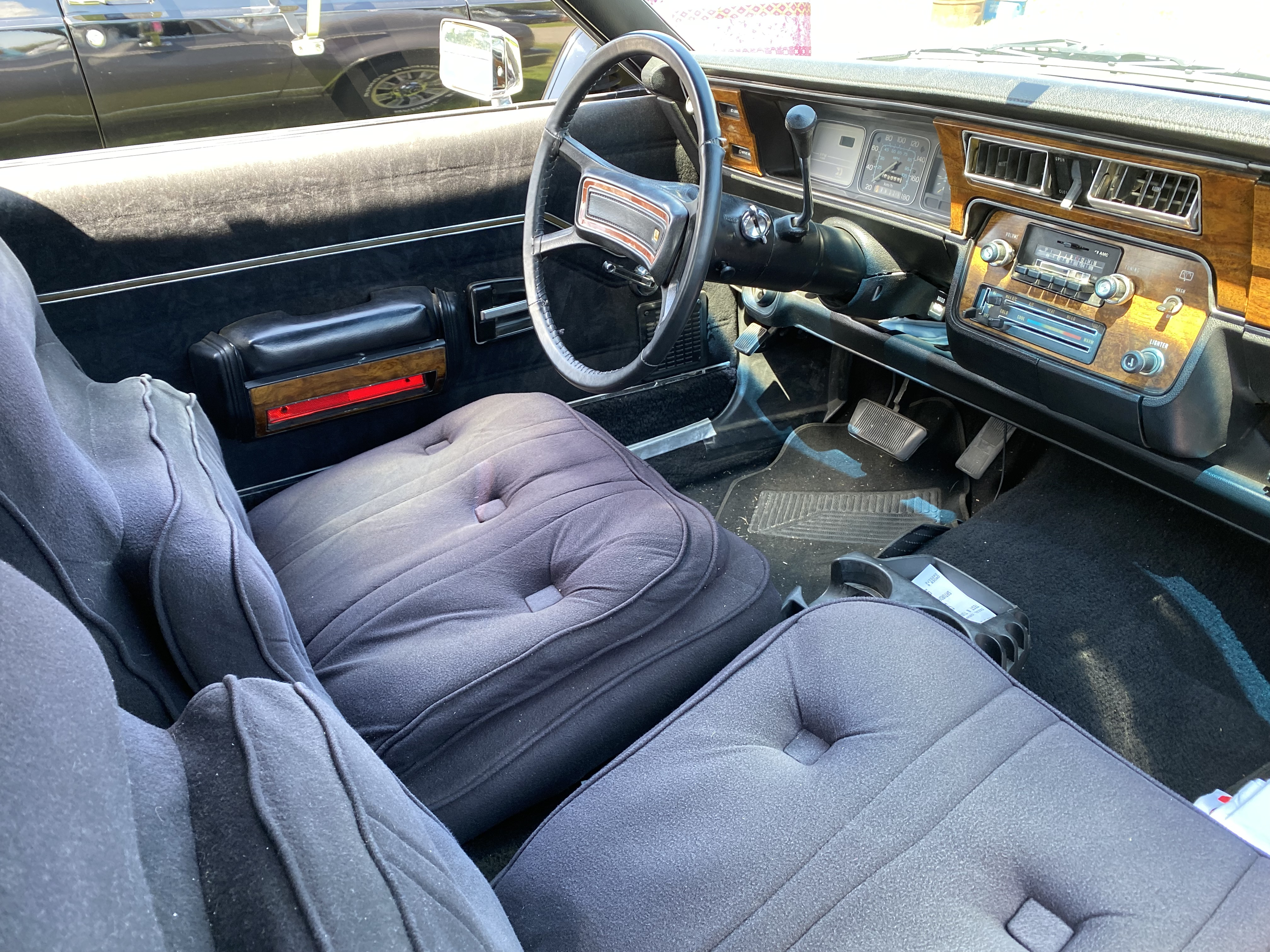
Standard interior

The 1981 VAM Lerma was available as a single edition and carried a VAM 282 cu in (4.6 L) I6 engine with a Motorcraft two-barrel carburetor, 8.0:1 compression ratio, and a 266-degree camshaft designed by VAM's engineering department. It was rated at 132 hp (98 kW; 134 PS) at 3900 rpm and 216 lb⋅ft (293 N⋅m) of torque at 2200 rpm. The only transmission was the Chrysler Torqueflite A998 three-speed automatic with a 3.07 rear differential gear ratio. The suspension consisted of an independent front design with coil springs, heavy-duty shocks, and a front sway bar, while the rear incorporated leaf springs with heavy-duty shock absorbers. Brakes were power-assisted, with front disc brakes and rear drum brakes. The cooling system incorporated a three-row radiator, a flexible seven-bladed fan, a fan shroud, and a coolant recovery tank. The Lerma had the same 18.5-US-gallon (70 L; 15 imp gal) fuel tank as the American line. Tire specification was ER78×14.

Interiors were available in four colors: black, nut brown, sky blue, and wine red. With the only exceptions of the A and C-pillar inner plastic moldings, the windshield and rear hatch inner plastic surrounding moldings, the door latches, the door cranks, the side armrests, the door ashtrays, the steering wheel, column, and the dashboard, the rest of the interior was designed and made in Mexico by VAM's styling department. The Lerma's interior relied on deluxe door panels, side panels, trunk, and seats. The first two incorporated premium fabric and lower portion horizontal carpet inserts with fake horizontal chrome (lower portion) and woodgrain (upper portion) moldings. Seating consisted of a fixed rear bench seat and individual reclining front wide bucket seats with adjustable headrests. The pattern on the seats featured four square buttons forming another square over the seat bottoms and backs. These portions are actually the outer ones over the main body of the seat and are not stretched out, giving the impression of a cushion over both the main seat bottom and back. The bases of both sets of seats are covered in carpet. The VAM Lerma was the only four-door VAM car not to incorporate a fixed front bench seat, making it also the only four-door VAM car to incorporate individual (reclining) front seats. The Lerma's trunk is unique among VAM (and AMC) cars alike. It is a closed compartment covered in carpet and incorporates rear stereo speakers on both sides of the lid. The lid itself is hinged to the back of the frame near the rear seat back and has a fixed rear light similar to the ones used in the hood; it would go on and off depending on the position of the lid. Despite the appearance and design meant to follow the interior sides, the large rear hatch glass left little space underneath for anything other than the spare tire. This situation meant and external roof rack mounted on the side drip rails to carry luggage.

On the exterior, the VAM Lerma showed influences from the Concord and Spirit models it was based on. The most unusual parts are the rear quarter panels, the rear side windows, the squared grid grille design divided into two sets of four horizontal rectangular portions (not shared with any other VAM car), the gold and black VAM logo on the hood ornament, the manuscript "Lerma" emblems over both fenders, and the right corner of the hatch. One final detail was added midyear: the round side marker lights used on the Rally (Spirit) models were replaced with rectangular units with chrome frames. The Lerma incorporated an exclusive design of side protective moldings running most of the car's length, placed higher than the regular moldings. A bright molding package was standard, consisting of wheel lip moldings, drip rail moldings, rocker panel moldings, the already chromed bumpers, dual squared chromed mirrors, and the rear glass and windshield moldings. The wheels used by the model were VAM's in-house five-spoke 14x6-inch units complemented by AMC's "Noryl" wheelcover design. The full length of the Lerma was only two inches shorter than that of the VAM American (Concord) sedan models.

Convenience standard accessories included power steering, tinted windshield, intermittent wipers, woodgrain panels applied on dashboard, luxury steering wheel, heater with front defroster, Quartz clock, 180 km/h-110 mph speedometer, water temperature and gasoline level gauges, warning lights with international symbols, inside hood release, rear defroster, lighted vanity mirror on passenger's side sunvisor, AM FM stereo radio with four speakers, cigarette lighter, front ashtray, locking glove box, parcel shelf, complete light group (hood, trunk, front ashtray, glovebox, courtesy, reading dome light), dual remote-controlled remote mirrors (non-electric), three-point retractable front seatbelts, side armrest safety reflectors on front doors, dual rear ashtrays, spare tire cover and locking gas cap. Optional equipment included air conditioning, power door locks, power windows, power trunk release, electric antenna, power seats, and a tilting steering column.

== Reception ==
The introduction of the VAM Lerma in 1981 was an unexpected move for VAM. It was all-new body made exclusively by Mexican designers and engineers. VAM was known for developing original design features such as interiors, body accents (wheels, hubcaps, emblems, vinyl roof treatments, decal designs plus C-pillar porthole opera windows and B-pillar opera windows like the 1977 GFS design that was adopted by AMC for the Concord two-door), and all-new completely-original editions for the Mexican market by Mexicans (Rambler Go Pack two-door sedan, Classic Brougham hardtop, Classic AMX coupe, American 06/S Concord two-door sedan, 1979 Pacer X coupe, 1979-1982 Gremlin X Spirit sedans, and all 1969-1983 Rally models). VAM also achieved engineering such as the 4.6/X, 4.6 SX and Go Pack 282 inline six-cylinder engines as well as the standard 252 and 282 units).

The performance on the market was lower than expected. Pricing was almost on par with the luxury V8 compacts of the competition. Potential customers did not consider VAM models in that market range. The styling, was perceived as too plain for a luxury vehicle. While the front and rear of the car were considered acceptable, the sides were cosmetically almost too smooth and monotonous. The trim was considered insufficient. The aspect that is considered the greatest cause for the Lerma to draw customers away was the almost non-existent trunk space, making it impractical.

Both the Mexican government and public at the time contributed their shares to the partial failure of the VAM Lerma; the auto industry legislation created by the Mexican government in the early 1960s in regards to a limited number of car lines per marque (three) and the number of body styles per line of products always created a limited number of choices for the Mexican buyer. These limitations forced the automakers in Mexico to consolidate lines of models and trim levels; mostly opting to offer mid-segment models and semi-equipped versions with only a couple of low- or high-end exceptions. In regards to body styles, this situation caused that the smallest most affordable models offered by automakers in Mexico were always the second to the smallest and most basic ones in their home countries. One example of this through the 1970s was that Ford Motor Company's smallest most affordable model was the Pinto in the United States while Ford de México's smallest most affordable model was the Maverick. This meant that in most cases an automaker's smallest most affordable model in Mexico was a compact notchback sedan in either two or four doors, while in their countries of origin there was the possibility of a subcompact hatchback. Under these circumstances, the Mexican public was very accustomed to notchback body styles, making hatchback designs a lot less common and almost unthinkable for a high-end luxury market. Cars like the Volkswagen Caribe (Rabbit) and VAM's own Gremlin and Pacer models had helped to change the trend gradually but by 1981 it was still not enough. People in Mexico at the time were mostly against paying the price of a luxury car for a hatchback.

The tooling costs of the model were very low as VAM did its best to use as many of the existing parts and components as possible. The interior door and side panels were shared with the high trim models American GFS, American ECD and Camioneta American DL of the same year. The only interior components not shared with other VAM cars were limited to the trunk, the seats and the headliner. The only exterior components exclusive to the VAM Lerma were the grille, the rear side windows and the protective moldings. The initial sales of the model were enough to regain the investment and it ended up being profitable for the company. The development process of the model was a valuable experience for the company.

== 610 and 620 ==
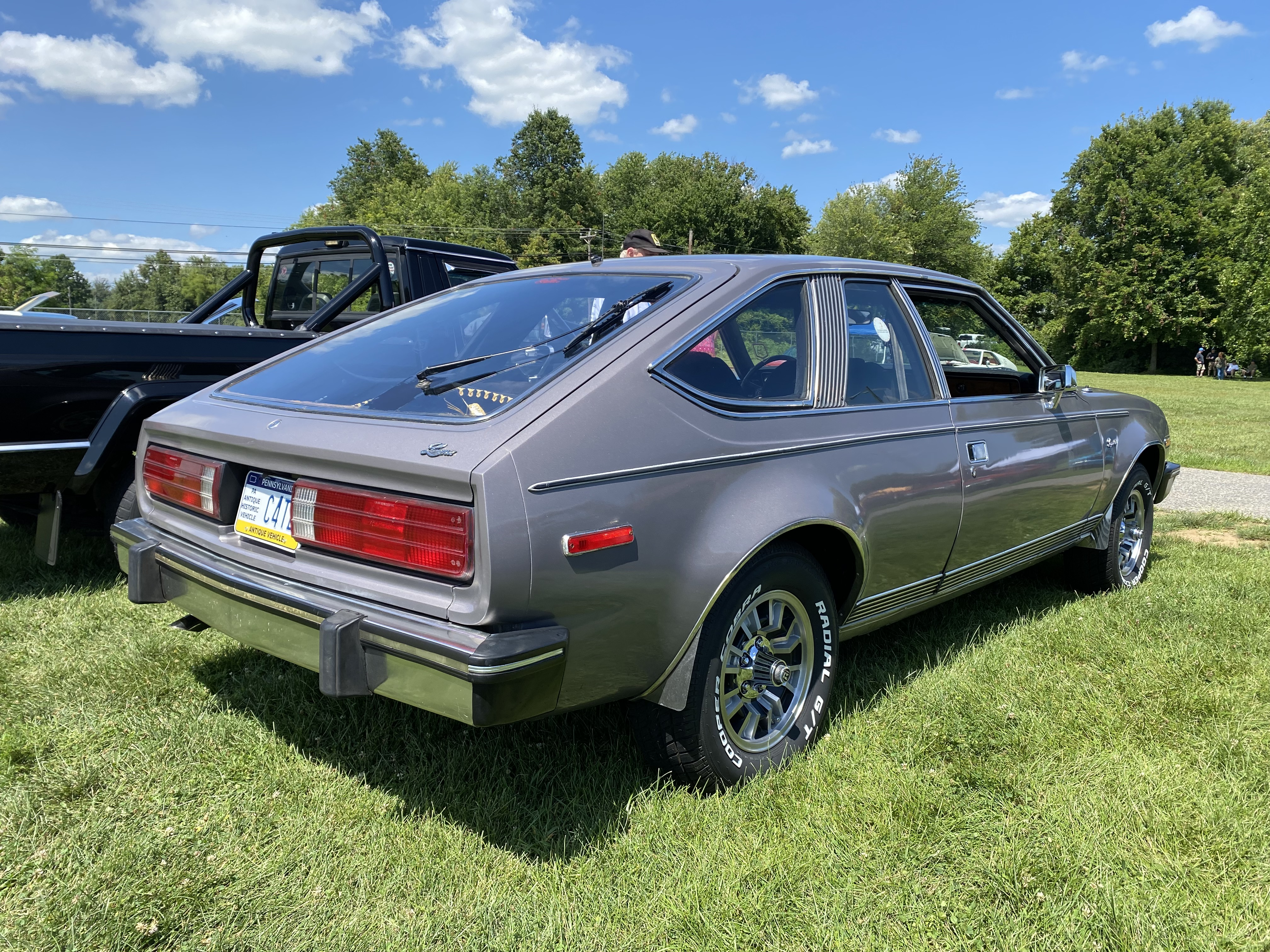
1982 VAM Lerma 620 two-door liftback

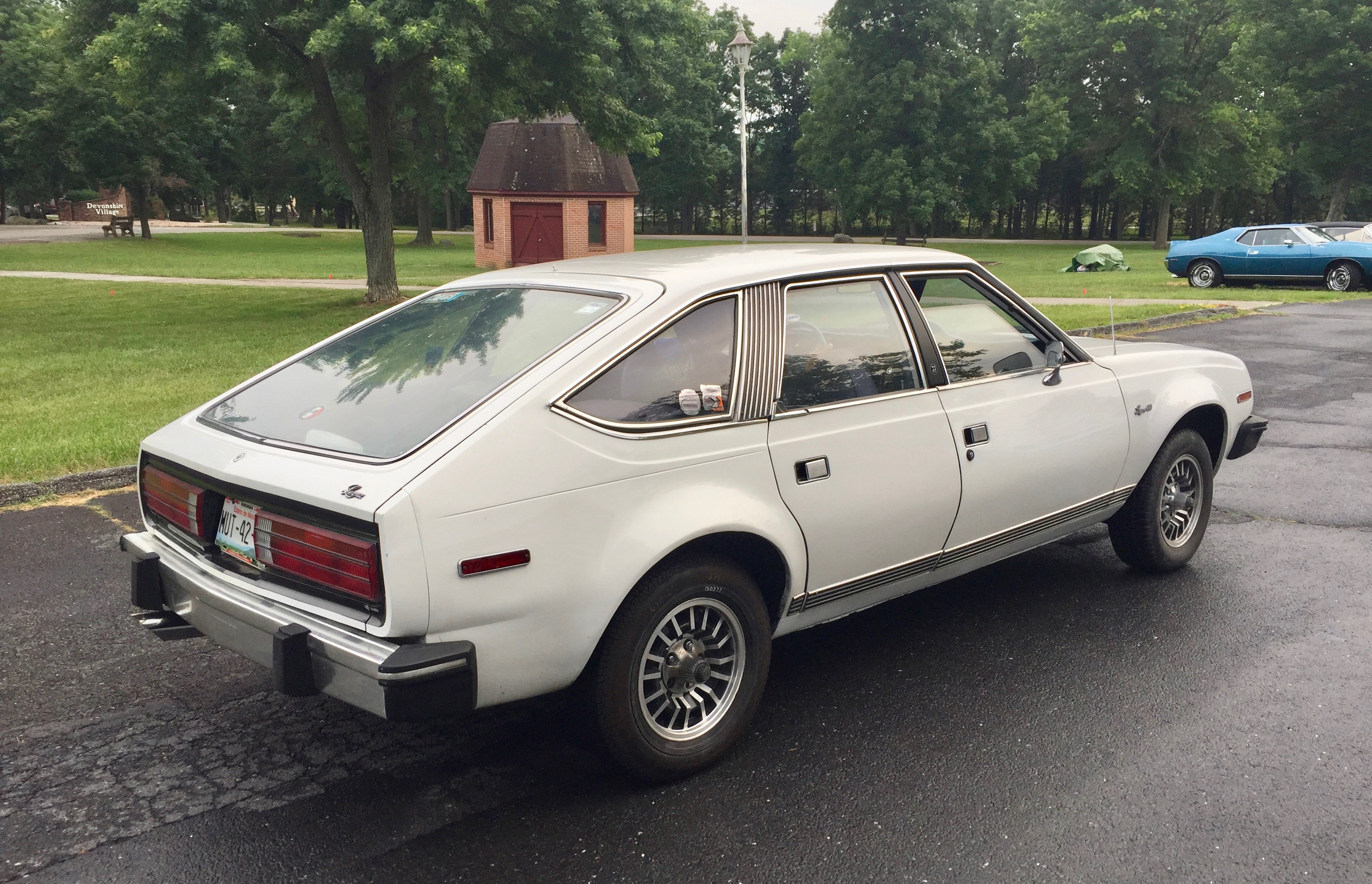
1982 VAM Lerma 620 four-door liftback

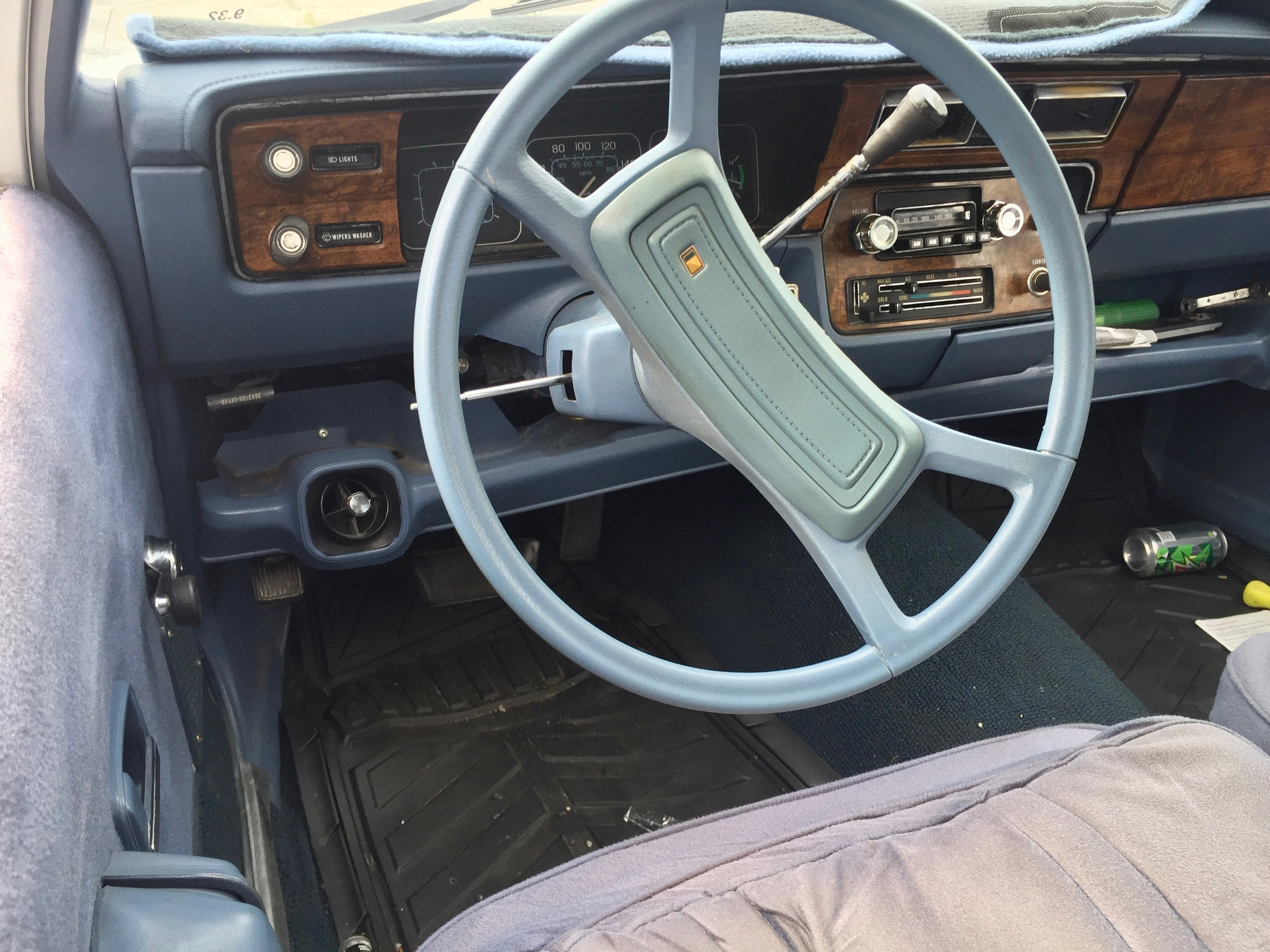
VAM Lerma interior

VAM changed and updated Lerma model for 1982. In the exterior, the squared grid grille design divided in rectangles was replaced by an all-new totally chromed metal grille with a simple design of thin horizontal stripes with equally thin spaces between them. The headlight bezels were completely blacked out in their internal parts with only their external surrounding portions retaining a chromed appearance. The front parking lights were changed from transparent to amber. Both bumpers received AMC's Eagle thick nerfing strip design with a central bright molding and new VAM-designed plain smooth bumper end caps continuing the bright molding on their upper portions.

On both sides, changes were more noticeable. The bright molding on the rocker panels was retained and new moldings with a six horizontal stripe pattern were fitted to the bottom edges of the front fenders, doors and sides. The wheel lip and drip rail bright moldings remained unchanged while new additional bright moldings appeared in the form of units one the bases of the door and side glass areas as well as new bright moldings for the internal part of the door and side window frames. The trim plate between the side glass (two-door model) or between the rear door and side glass (four-door model) was changed in favor of a new plate following the same six striped pattern as the low side moldings. This plate existed only in the two-door model in 1981 but it was present in both body styles for 1982. The small angular mid side window of the 1981 two-door model was replaced by the normal unit used since the two-door AMC Hornet and two-door AMC Concord base models. The five-spoke VAM wheels with Noryl-type wheelcovers were replaced by new aluminum wheels with chromed volcano centercaps and lug nuts.

The interior changes and upgrades included the deletion of the trunk, leaving a completely open compartment that carried a standard small high-pressure space-saver spare tire. The rear stereo speakers were located in the rear panel behind the tail lights like in the Rally (Spirit liftback) models. The original fixed Lerma rear bench seat was replaced by the same unit used in the Camioneta American (Concord wagon) incorporating a fold down mechanism for an improved and expanded cargo capacity, retaining its unique original Lerma upholstery design. In terms of appearance, both seats and side panel designs were the same as the year before with only smaller added details for a slightly more luxurious look.

The Lerma for 1982 included a different head gasket for the 4.6 Liter engine that brought compression ratio from 8.0:1 to 8.5:1. The standard A998 three-speed automatic transmission got wider gear ratios. The final technical change came in the midyear with a new head design with larger rounder intake ports and smaller spark plug outlets; making a more powerful engine.

After giving the Lerma the luxury car appearance given the preferences of the Mexican market and correcting the limited trunk space, VAM adjusted the pricing strategy. This was by offering two trim levels for the model, a lower-priced intermediate "Lerma 610" and the upscale top-of-the-line "Lerma 620". The differences were in positioning as changes were limited to their standard equipment. The Lerma 610 was equipped with two-speed electric windshield wipers, a dome light, and a heater. The Lerma 620 included intermittent wipers, dome and reading lights, air conditioning, vanity mirror on passenger's side sun visor, as well as a rear wiper and washer. These five standard 620 features could be ordered separately in the 610 models. In all other aspects the 610 and 620 Lerma were equal.

The Mexican government instituted a new policy that negatively impacted the Lerma as a luxury model and also on all of its competitors. In an effort to reduce imports, the government banned the foreign supply of luxury automotive accessories so as to have them produced or sourced locally. This meant an inevitable reduction in the lists of both standard and optional equipment. In the first, the Lerma lost the Quartz digital clock, the rear defroster and the "Noryl" wheelcovers. The extra-charge equipment list no longer offered power door locks, power windows, power seats, power trunk release, and tilt steering column. Items that were standard in 1981 and survived became optional in 1982 were the remote-controlled exterior mirrors. The full list of optional equipment for the 1982 VAM Lerma 620 consisted of electric antenna, tape player AM/FM stereo radio, remote controlled mirrors, and sports steel wheels. The new aluminum wheels for 1982 were practically a replacement of the previous year's wheelcovers while the new-for-the rear wiper and washer took the place of the rear defroster.

== End of the line ==
The recession that broke out in February 1982 swept the whole of the Mexican auto industry. The devaluation of the Mexican peso coupled with the currency flight took VAM's parent company, the FISOMEX conglomerate, almost to brink of bankruptcy. At the current situation, the best possible course of action left was to sell the company and Renault de México stepped in. Due to the additional required time for the hand labor stage of the Lerma production process, the new owner determined the discontinuation of the Lerma line. The short run of the 1983 VAM passenger car line consisted of the base and mid segment American, Gremlin and Rally models like in 1980. Reportedly, leftover 1982 Lerma 610 and 620 units were sold as 1983 models.

== Stirling engine ==
A VAM Lerma served as test vehicle for the Stirling engine. It was an alternatives to the traditional engines and converted to an experimental P-40 engine. The Lerma was used to inform the public about the Stirling engine.
