= Wenceslao Herrera Coyac =

Mexican politician

- Born: 28 September 1948 (age 77); Puebla, Mexico
- Occupation: Politician
- Political party: PRI

Wenceslao Herrera Coyac (born 28 September 1948) is a Mexican politician affiliated with the Institutional Revolutionary Party (PRI). In the 2006 general election he was elected to the Chamber of Deputies to represent Puebla's 4th district during the 60th session of Congress.
