= Pablo Aguilar =

Pablo Aguilar may refer to:

- Pablo Aguilar (footballer, born 1984), Argentine footballer
- Pablo Aguilar (footballer, born 1987), Paraguayan footballer
- Pablo Aguilar (footballer, born 1995), Guatemalan footballer
- Pablo Aguilar (basketball) (born 1989), Spanish professional basketball player
