= Hispanic Enterprise Magazine =

Joint project of Editorial Televisa and US Hispanic Chamber of Committee

Hispanic Enterprise
- Hispanic Enterprise Magazine, June–July 2007 Issue
- Editor: Carlos Alfaro
- Categories: Business Magazines
- Frequency: Monthly
- Circulation: ~170,000
- Publisher: Televisa Publishing, a Televisa company.
- Founded: 2002
- Final issue: July 2008
- Country: United States
- Based in: Miami, Florida
- Language: English
- Website: www.hispanicenterprisemagazine.com

Hispanic Enterprise Magazine, formerly Hispanic Trends Magazine, was a joint project of Editorial Televisa and the United States Hispanic Chamber of Commerce. Its headquarters was in Miami, Florida. The publication is a source of news, features and information for every Hispanic entrepreneur and anyone affiliated with the Hispanic marketplace. In 2006, Hispanic Enterprise successfully launched its digital version.

Published in English, Hispanic Enterprise aimed at the business community of Hispanic entrepreneurs. It was primarily distributed to members of the United States Hispanic Chamber of Commerce, which at last count in 2005, numbered approximately 2 million in the United States, generating almost $300 billion in annual gross receipt.

In July 2008, the magazine was combined with PODER Magazine and started circulating under the name PODER Enterprise.
