= José Aguilar Álvarez =

Mexican physician (1902–1959)

27th Rector of the National Autonomous University of Mexico.
- In office 3 August 1944 – 7 August 1944
- Preceded by: Samuel Ramírez Moreno
- Succeeded by: Alfonso Caso Andrade

Personal details
- Born: 1902 Mexico City, Mexico
- Died: 1959 (aged 56–57) Mexico City, Mexico
- Occupation: Doctor

José Aguilar Álvarez (1902–1959) was a Mexican physician.

== Education and career ==
Álvarez began his studies at the French School and concluded in the National Preparatory School. In March 1923 he took the professional examinations for his surgical doctor degree.

In 1925 he began his career, teaching topographical anatomy at the National School of Medicine.

In July 1938, the University Council appointed him director of the National School of Medicine, a position he held until July 1942. In response to the call issued by the rector, Samuel Ramirez, a large group of college counselors, seven of the fifteen directors and counselors most teachers and students met to elect a president on August 3, 1944. This Council, which was considered a legitimate successor of the legally constituted board, appointed Álvarez as rector of the National University.

== Conflict with the university ==
Four days after Álvarez's appointment, the Mexican President Manuel Ávila Camacho, decided to ask both the rector and the rector ephemeral, Manuel Gual Vidal appointed by the University Council, to resign.

== See also ==
- Manuel Gual Vidal (Transient Rector)
- National Autonomous University of Mexico

Preceded by Samuel Ramírez Moreno	Rector, National Autonomous University of Mexico; 3 August 1944 - 7 August 1944	Succeeded by Alfonso Caso Andrade
