= Alberto Aguilar =

Alberto Aguilar may refer to:

- Alberto Aguilar (Mexican footballer) (born 1960), Mexican football manager, and former footballer
- Alberto Aguilar (Spanish footballer) (born 1984), Spanish footballer
- Alberto Aguilar (sprinter) (born 1985), Venezuelan sprinter
- Alberto Luis Aguilar (1950–2025), Bolivian politician
