= Mario Aguilar =

Mario Aguilar may refer to:

- Mario Aguilar (sailor) (1925–1990), Salvadoran sailor
- Mario Aguilar (academic) (born 1959), Chilean-British professor in religion and politics
- Mario Aguilar (footballer) (born 1984), Salvadoran footballer
- Mario Aguilar (percussionist) (fl. 1990s), former member of Tribe of Gypsies
