= Joselia Aguiar =

Brazilian writer

Joselia Aguiar (born 1978 in Salvador, Bahia) is a Brazilian writer. She has a PhD in history from the Universidade de São Paulo. She worked at Folha de Sao Paulo and curated the International Literary Festival of Paraty (Flip) in 2017 and 2018. Currently she is the director of the Mário de Andrade Library.

Aguiar is the biographer of the Brazilian novelist, Jorge Amado. She won the Premio Jabuti for her 2018 book Jorge Amado: a biography.
