= Jordi Gual =

Spanish economist (born 1957)

Jordi Gual Solé (Lleida, 1957) is a Spanish economist and chairman of CaixaBank and professor of IESE Business School – University of Navarra.

== Career ==
He joined "La Caixa" in 2005 and has been chief economist and chief strategy officer of CaixaBank.

He is research fellow of the Center for Economic Policy Research (CEPR, London), member of the Oxera Economics Council and member of the board of the European Corporate Governance Institute (ECGI).

Between 2002 and 2005, Gual was part of the Economic Advisory Group on Competition Policy of the European Commission. Previously he had been economic adviser to the director-general for economic and financial affairs of the European Commission in Brussels between 1994 and 1996.

On June 28, 2016, he was announced as Isidre Fainé i Casas's successor as president of CaixaBank, a role he held until March 30, 2021, when he stepped down after the merger with Bankia. On April 16, 2021, he was named president of VidaCaixa.

He holds a PhD in economics from the University of California at Berkeley, and has been visiting professor at this university, the Université libre de Bruxelles and the Barcelona Graduate School of Economics. He is also professor of IESE Business School – University of Navarra and Doctor of Economics and Business Science by the University of Barcelona, was the winner of the Grant for Research on European Integration of the European Commission and received a Fulbright Scholar.

His recent publications include Banking Union: made of concrete or straw? (2013) and European Integration at the Crossroads (Bank of Spain, 2012).
