= Libres, Puebla =

Coordinates: 19°28′N 97°41′W

Libres
- Municipality and town
- Coat of arms

- Location of the municipality in Puebla
- Country: Mexico
- State: Puebla

Population (2010)
  - Total: 31,532
- Time zone: UTC-6 (Zona Centro)
- Website: https://web.archive.org/web/20120713000052/http://www.libres.gob.mx/

Libres is a town and municipality in the Mexican state of Puebla.
