= Rotceh Aguilar =

Peruvian footballer (born 2001)

Personal information
- Full name: Rotceh Américo Aguilar Rupany
- Date of birth: 12 June 2001 (age 25)
- Place of birth: Lima, Peru
- Height: 1.75 m (5 ft 9 in)
- Position: Right-back

Team information
- Current team: Comerciantes Unidos
- Number: 31

Youth career
- Esther Grande
- Deportivo Municipal

Senior career*
| Years | Team | Apps | (Gls) |
| 2019–2023 | Deportivo Municipal | 78 | (2) |
| 2023 | Alianza Atlético | 7 | (0) |
| 2024 | Los Chankas | 6 | (0) |
| 2025– | Comerciantes Unidos | 9 | (0) |

International career
| 2022– | Peru U23 | 1 | (0) |
- * Club domestic league appearances and goals as of 15:29, 16 August 2025 (UTC)

Rotceh Américo Aguilar Rupany (born 12 June 2001) is a Peruvian footballer who plays as a right-back for Comerciantes Unidos.

== Career ==
=== Club career ===
Aguilar played for Esther Grande and Deportivo Municipal during his time as a youth player. He got his professional for Deportivo Municipal in the Peruvian Primera División on 2 March 2019 against Deportivo Binacional. Aguilar played as a centre back the whole game, which Municipal lost 3–0. He made a total of five appearances for the club in the 2019 season.

On 16 November 2021, Aguilar signed a contract extension until the end of 2022. In June 2023, Aguilar joined Alianza Atlético.

After six months without a club, Los Chankas confirmed in June 2024 that Aguilar had signed with the club. Ahead of the 2025 season, Aguilar moved to Comerciantes Unidos.

== International career ==
During 2019, Aguilar was called up for the Peru U18 national team a few times. In June 2020, Aguilar was also called up for the Peru national under-20 football team. He made it to the final squad, which was announced at the end of August 2020.
