= Rafael Lara Grajales (municipality) =

- Municipality and town
- Location within Puebla (state) Location within Mexico
- Coordinates: 19°13′39″N 97°48′14″W
- Country: Mexico
- State: Puebla

Population (2020)
  - Total: 15,952
- Time zone: UTC-6 (Zona Centro)

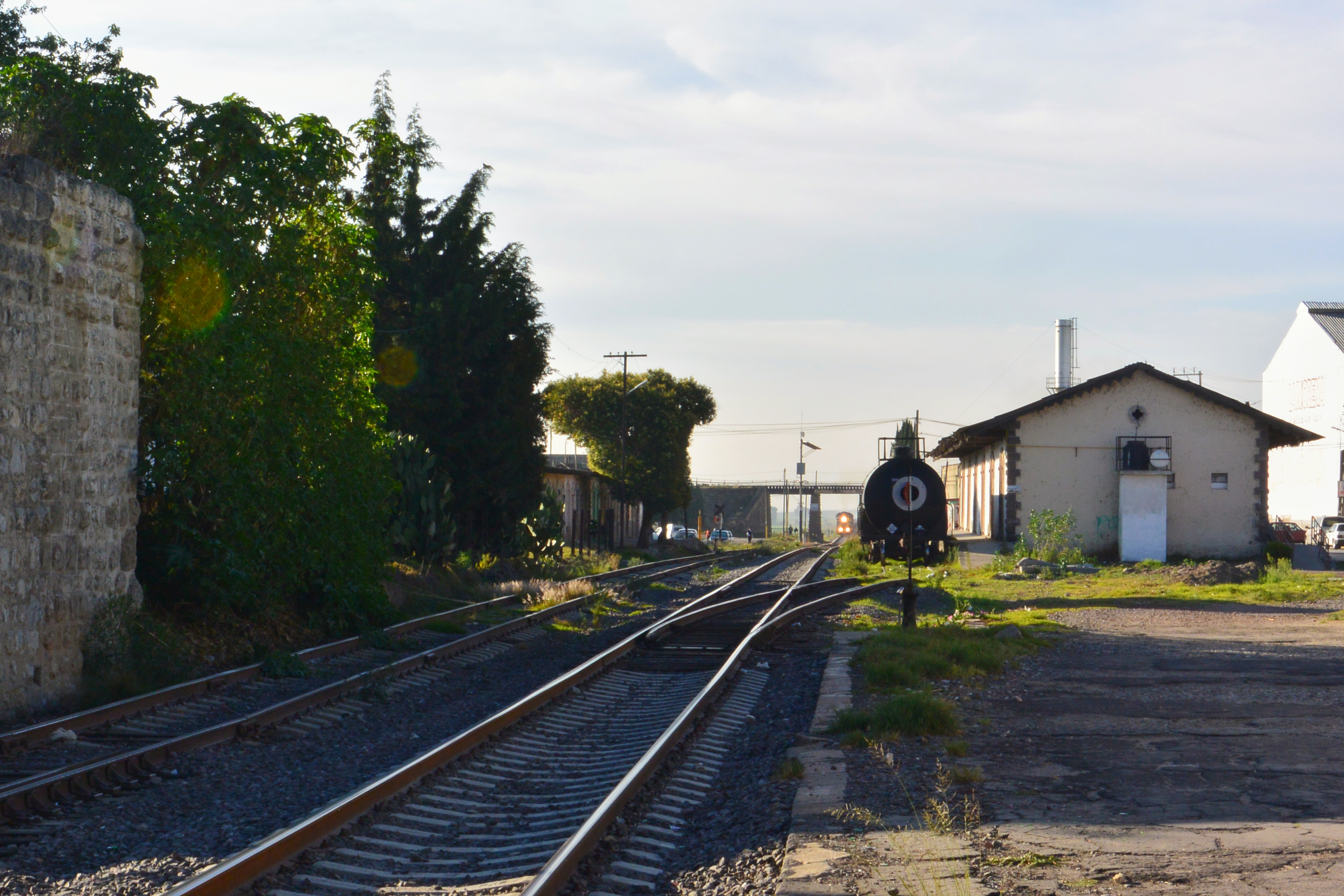

Rafael Lara Grajales is a town and municipality in the Mexican state of Puebla named after the revolutionary general Rafael Lara Grajales. It is twinned with Sariwon, North Korea.
