= Lafragua =

- Municipality
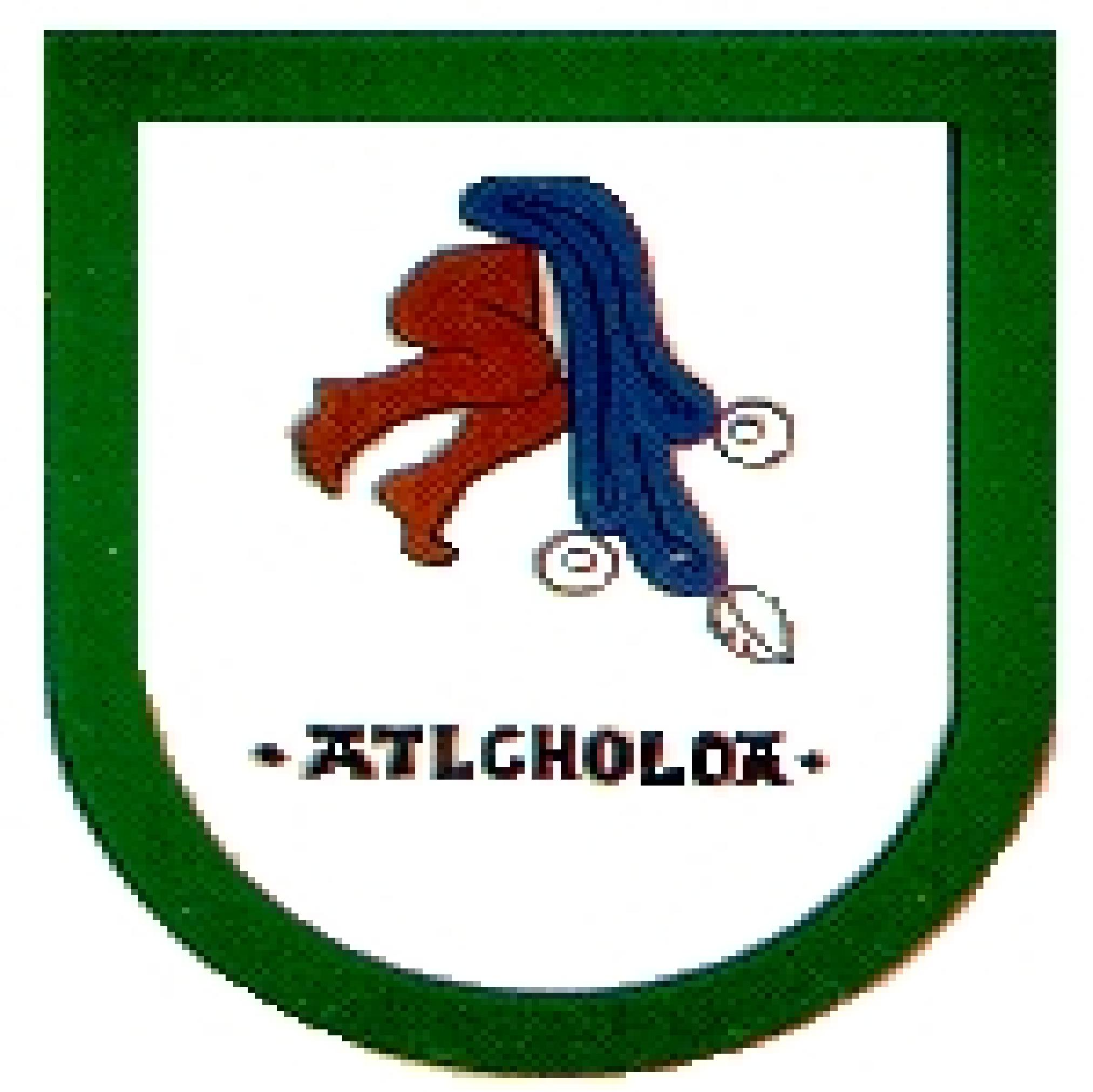
- Coat of arms

- Coordinates: 19°17′52″N 97°17′54″W
- Country: Mexico
- State: Puebla

Area
  - Total: 128.85 km^{2} (49.75 sq mi)
- Elevation: 2,829 m (9,281 ft)

Population (2010)Municipality
  - Total: 7,767
  - Seat: 761
- Time zone: UTC-6 (Zona Centro)
- Website: (in Spanish)

Lafragua is a municipality in the Mexican state of Puebla. According to the National Statistics Institute (INEGI), it had a population of 10,551 inhabitants in the 2005 census. By the 2010 census it had dropped to 7,767 inhabitants, 761 of whom lived in Saltillo, the municipal seat. Its total area is 128.85 km². The Saltillo name comes from the Nahuatl words Atlcholoa in atl, which means water, and Choloa, meaning drip. Therefore, means water that drips. The name Lafragua is in honor of José María Lafragua.

Its geographical coordinates are 19° 17′ 52” North, and 97° 17′ 54” West at Saltillo. Its average altitude is 2,860 m above sea level. The elevation at Saltillo is officially 2,829 meters (9,281.5 ft.), making it the third-highest municipal seat in Mexico (after Emiliano Zapata, Tlaxcala and El Porvenir, Chiapas).

Source: Statistics from INEGI
