= Vehículos Automotores Mexicanos =

Mexican automobile manufacturer

- Type: Semi-state controlled
- Industry: Automotive
- Predecessor: Willys Mexicana
- Founded: 1946 as Willys Mexicana
- Defunct: 1986
- Fate: Defunct
- Successor: Renault de México
- Headquarters: Mexico City, Mexico
- Area served: Mexico
- Key people: Gabriel Fernández Sáyago; Roberto Rojas Flores; Raúl Netzahualcóyotl Valdez
- Products: Passenger cars, luxury sedans, performance cars, SUVs
- Parent: Sociedad Mexicana de Crédito Industrial

Vehículos Automotores Mexicanos, S.A. (VAM) was a Mexican automaker from 1946 through 1986.

The original organization, a distributor and licensed manufacturer for Willys-Overland and American Motors Corporation (AMC) vehicles, became government-controlled in 1963 with AMC holding a minority interest. The company imported and produced automobiles and light trucks under license from Willys, AMC, Jeep, Chrysler, Renault, and designed their own vehicles based on AMC platforms.

The early-1980s collapse of the Mexican economy forced the sale of the Mexican government's interest in VAM to Renault, which shut down the firm in the late 1980s. The Mexican government maintains the rights to the VAM name and brand.

== History ==
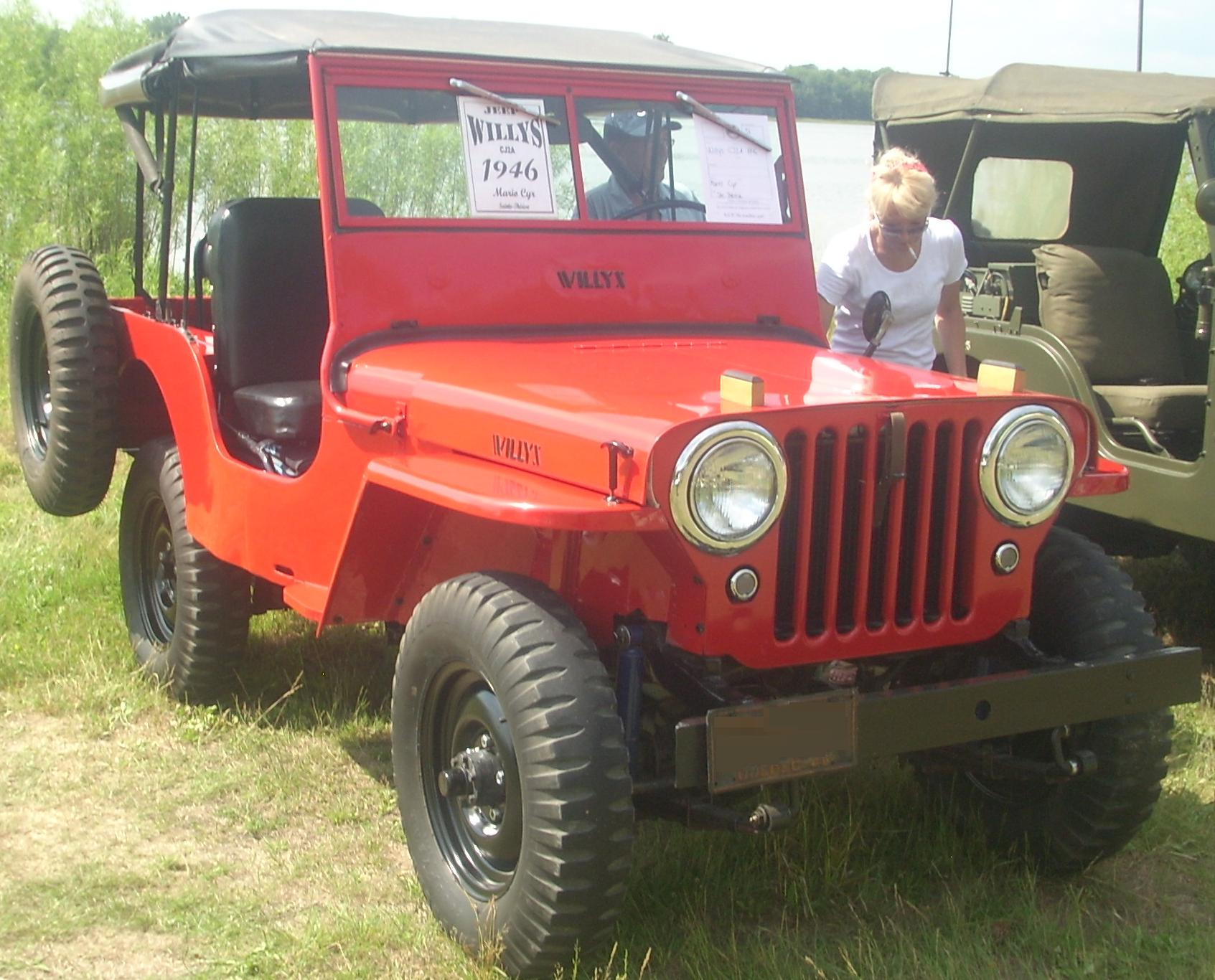
The Willys Jeep CJ-2A, the first vehicle produced by the company in 1946, when it was known as Willys Mexicana

Vehículos Automotores Mexicanos was established as its own company in 1963. The Mexican Government passed a law to control the privately owned Sociedad Mexicana de Credito Industrial (SOMEX), the parent company of Willys Mexicana S.A. (which was established in 1946 as a local manufacturer and distributor for Willys-Overland Jeeps and used both the names VAM and Willys Mexicana on its products) that held the license to produce and import AMC Ramblers.

Willys Mexicana was renamed VAM in 1963 following an agreement between American Motors Corporation (AMC) and the Mexican Government. After the restructuring of the original company, VAM proceeded to construct its own engine plant in the municipality of Lerma. At the same time, AMC took a 40% equity interest in VAM, but did not actively participate in the company's management. Government content regulations required that VAM vehicles have at least 60% locally sourced parts.

American Motors' stake in VAM passed into Renault's operations in late 1980, when Renault assumed majority (controlling) ownership of AMC. The last AMC-based cars were produced in 1983, the same year that AMC produced its last two-wheel-drive cars in the United States. Beginning in 1984, the company produced several Renault models as VAM vehicles.

The Mexican economy entered a recession and a devaluation of the Mexican peso beginning in 1982. The president of Mexico, Miguel de la Madrid Hurtado, introduced neoliberal economic reforms to encourage foreign investment and initiated widespread privatization of state-run industries. This included the sale of the Mexican government's interest in VAM to Renault. The Mexican government paid Renault US$200 million to take over VAM and assume its debts in 1987. Renault then ended VAM as an entity.

The enterprise represented one of the most significant industrial experiments aimed at developing an automotive industry with the involvement of the government and the ability to adapt vehicles to the needs of the Mexican market.

== Products ==
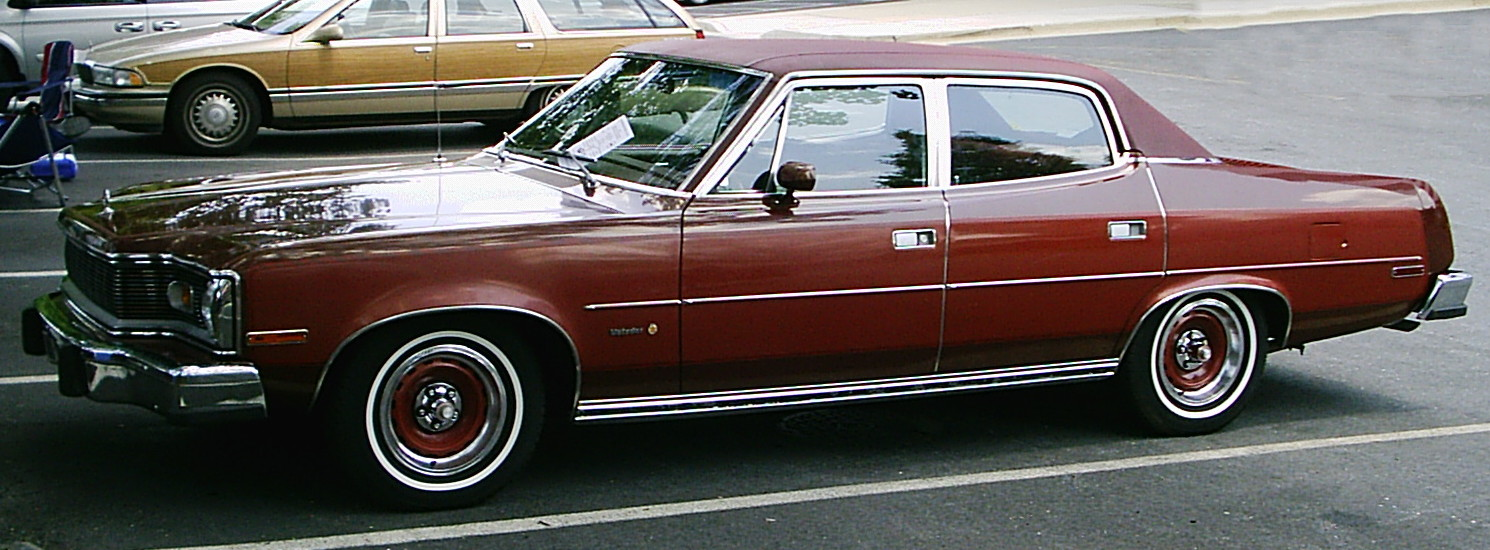
The VAM Classic, based on the AMC Matador

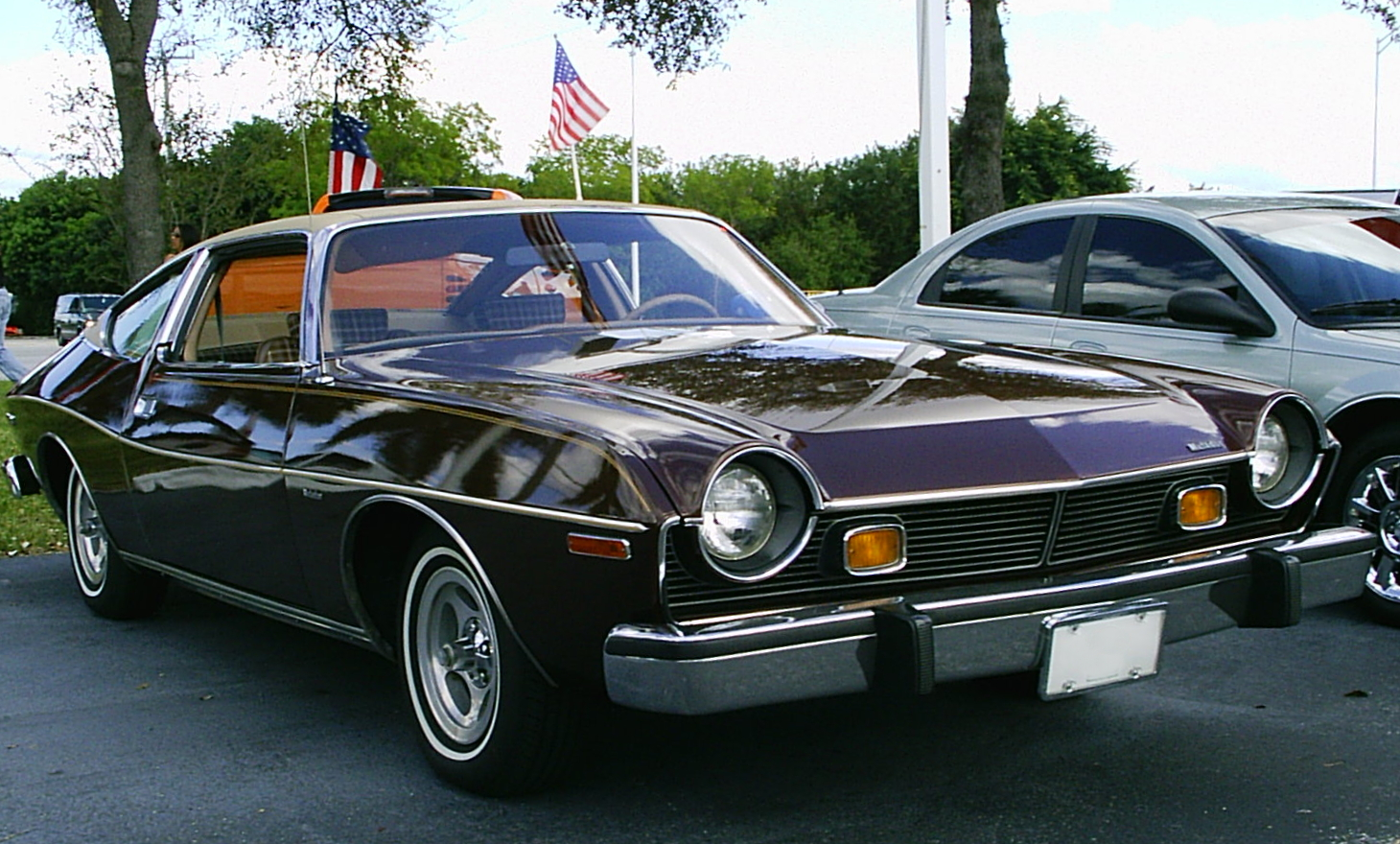
The AMC Matador Coupe was manufactured as a VAM vehicle

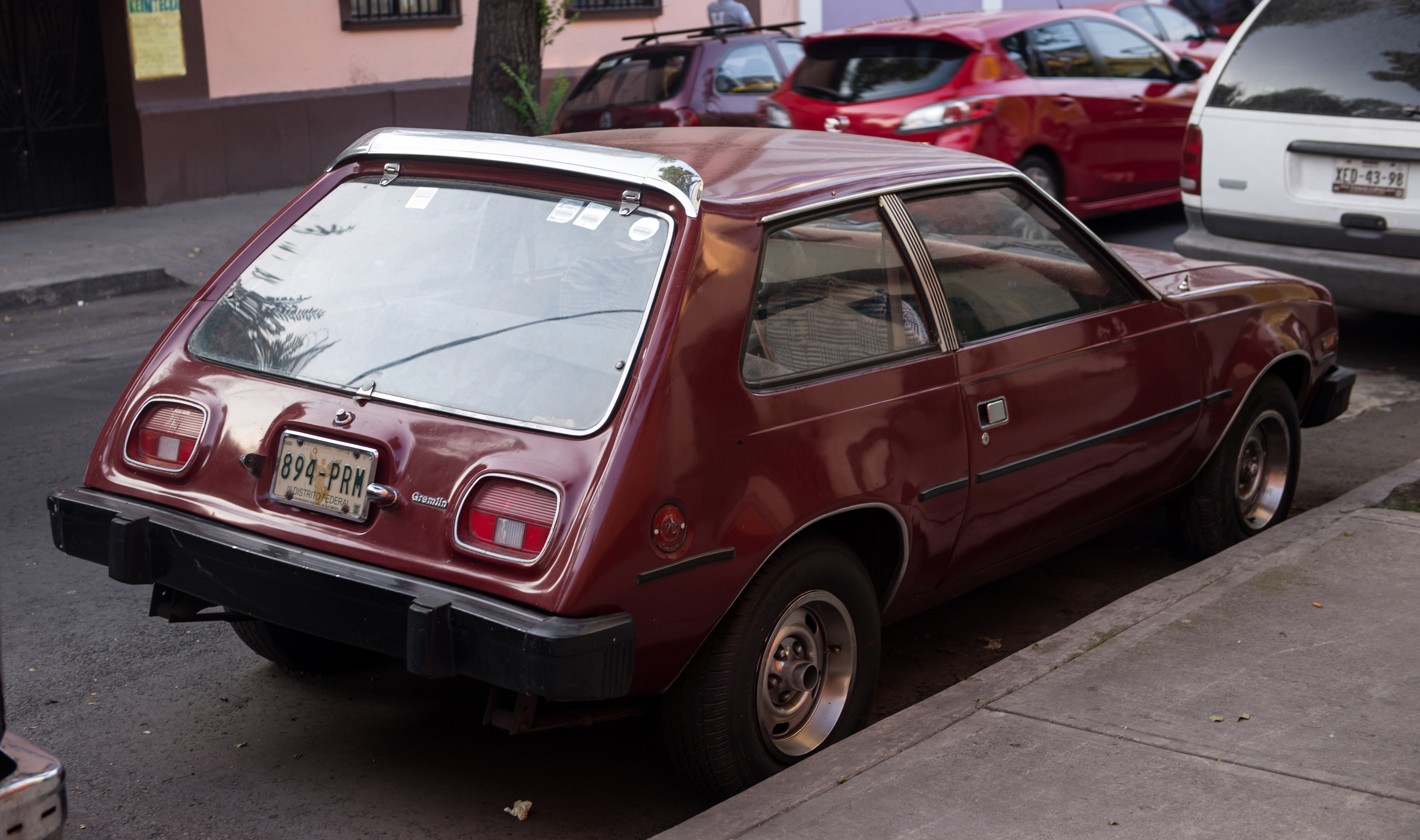
The VAM Gremlin was based on the 1979-83 AMC Spirit sedan but retained the older Gremlin name

1982 VAM Lerma 2-door

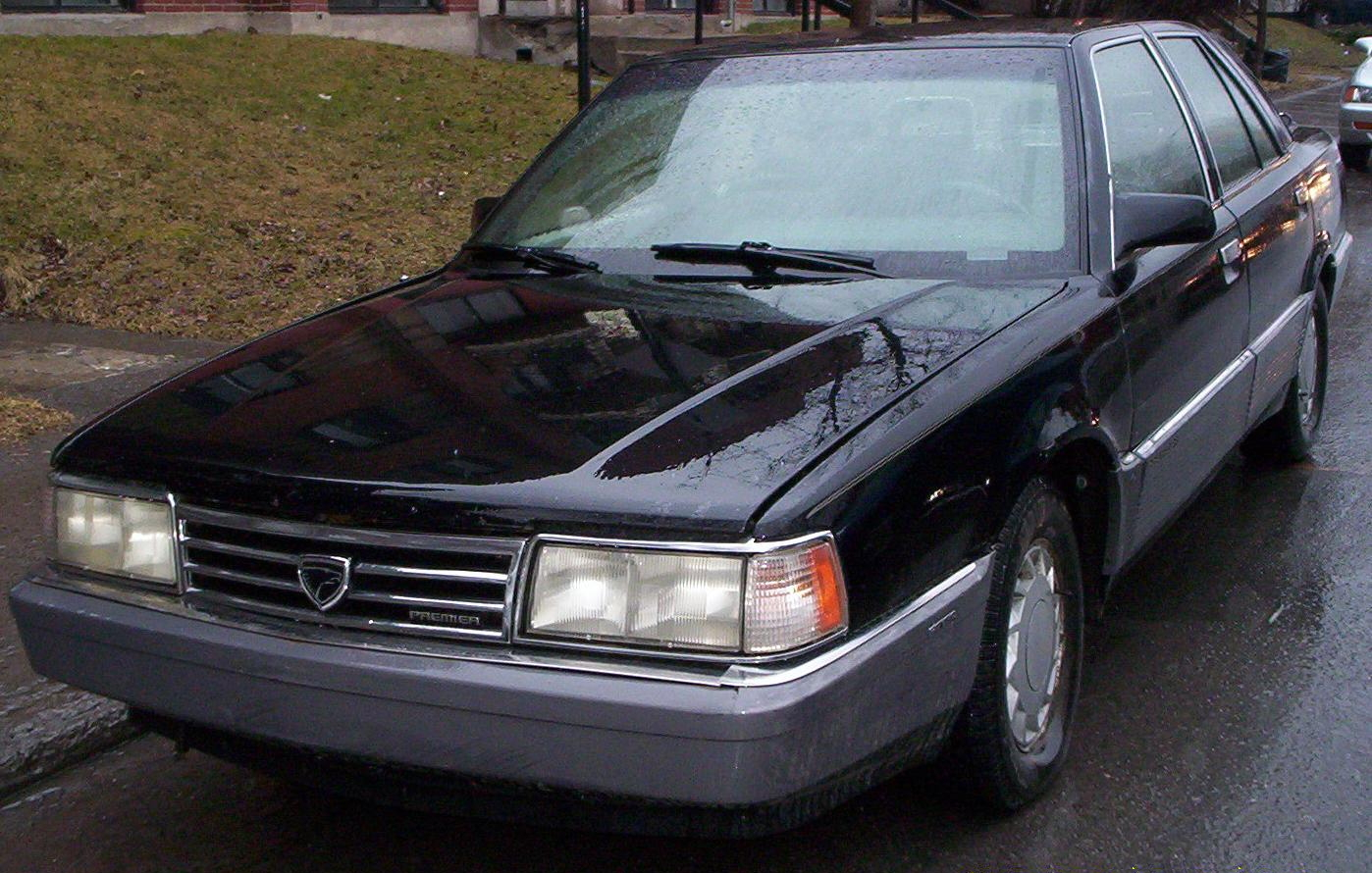
A modified version of the Eagle Premier was the last vehicle produced by VAM for a few months in 1987

From its inception as Willys Mexicana as a private in the late 1940s, the company manufactured Jeep vehicles under license. The business added assembly of AMC automobiles after 1954.

Most VAM cars mimicked domestic (U.S.) models but had differences in aesthetic design. In the sixties, VAM produced the Rambler American (in two- and four-door and wagon versions - as well as a limited single-year hardtop model - in two generations), a version of the AMC Rebel called the "Rambler Classic" (in two-door hardtop and four-door sedan versions), and the AMC Javelin pony car. In the 1970s, VAM produced a full line of AMC Hornets, first called "Rambler American" and, starting in 1975, simply "American," plus a sport version called "Rambler American Rally" (subsequently "American Rally"). The AMC Concord hatchback body style was badged as the "American Rally AMX." Rambler Classics, AMC Gremlins, Javelins, and Pacers were sold under their original U.S. names. The AMC Matador sedan models were badged as the "Classic DPL" since 1972, and starting in 1974, the Matador Coupe was produced in a sport version called "Classic AMX" and as a luxury "Classic Brougham" model. In later years, VAM badged variants of the AMC Spirit as the "Rally AMX", a luxury "Rally SST" version, and a high-performance "Rally GT" model. The Mexican version of the AMC Concord continued to be sold under the "American" name in base, GFS, ECD, and DL models.

Some VAM models mixed and matched body components from U.S. cars. Examples of Mexican-only cars include a 1977 two-door "Hornet" with a 1977–1978 Gremlin front clip. Many of these carried slightly different engines, all-original interiors, and different model and designation names than their counterparts in the United States and Canada, but were all based on U.S. bodies and used the same parts. Most bodies used the same year parts as U.S. production cars, but sometimes years and models were mixed. VAM built 1974–1976 Gremlins used the AMC Hornet grille and front fenders.

Vehículos Automotores Mexicanos designed and produced an original body that was not available in the U.S. or other markets: the VAM Lerma. Named after the town where VAM's engine factory was located, the Lerma was described as a "cut and weld" body. The rear hatchback portion of a VAM Rally (AMC Spirit liftback) replaced the trunk and rear end of the longer wheelbase AMC Concord (VAM American). Available in two- and four-door styles, this unique hatchback was positioned as a premium model. This idea was presented to AMC, but the tooling and labor costs to produce the car would have been prohibitive in the United States. Additionally, AMC was moving to smaller, front-wheel-drive Renault-based models to replace its rear-wheel-drive platform.

All VAM engines were of AMC design, but built in Mexico. However, VAM added unique engineering features to handle octane fuel and high altitudes. Among these were modified cylinder heads and a 282 cu in (4.6 L) I6 engine. It was based on a 258 block with a 0.16 in (4.06 mm) larger bore. This engine was not available from AMC. The larger displacement I6 helped in Mexico's high-altitude areas and offset the loss of power from the nation's low-octane fuel. Moreover, a V8 engine was not available in VAM-produced vehicles due to import restrictions.

In 1982, VAM's engineering department worked on a prototype Jeep Cherokee (XJ) and fitted VAM's straight-six into it (in place of AMC's four-cylinder or the optional V6 sourced from General Motors). AMC was impressed by the project, which eventually developed into the 4.0-liter engine version introduced in the 1987 Jeep Cherokee (XJ). The engine was manufactured by VAM from 1983 to 1989.
