= Rafael Lara Grajales (revolutionary) =

Mexican general

Rafael Lara Grajales was a Mexican general who represented the urban moderates, and with Alvaro Obregén supported General José María Sánchez. The municipality Rafael Lara Grajales, Puebla is named in his honour.
