= Matrix 01 =

Battery electric van

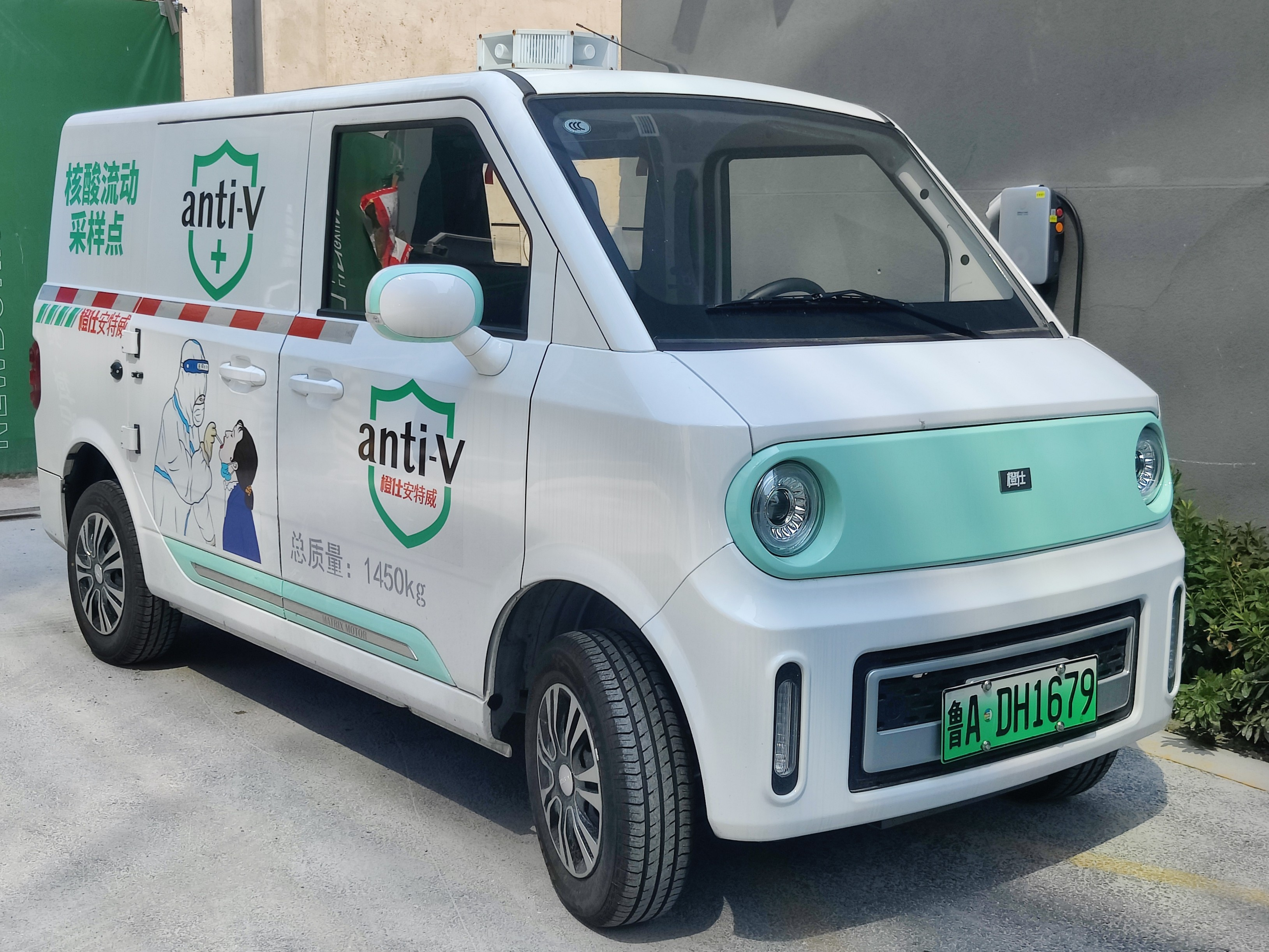

Overview
- Manufacturer: Matrix Motors
- Also called: Matrix X2/X5 (pickup variant); JAC Kala
- Production: 2020–present
- Assembly: China

Body and chassis
- Class: Light commercial vehicle
- Body style: 4-door van; 2-door single cab; 3-door crew cab
- Layout: Rear-engine, rear-wheel-drive

Powertrain
- Electric motor: Permanent magnet synchronous electric motor
- Power output: 15 kW (20 hp; 20 PS)
- Transmission: 1-speed direct-drive
- Battery: Li-ion battery: 10.36-20.72 kWh
- Electric range: 120–220 km (75–137 mi) (01); 110–200 km (68–124 mi) (X2)

Dimensions
- Wheelbase: 2,350 mm (92.5 in) (01); 2,600 mm (102.4 in) (X2)
- Length: 3,490 mm (137.4 in) (01); 4,200 mm (165.4 in) (X2/X5); 4,400 mm (173.2 in) (X5); 4,960 mm (195.3 in) (X5); 4,750 mm (187.0 in) (X5)
- Width: 1,465 mm (57.7 in) (01); 1,570 mm (61.8 in) (X2)
- Height: 1,685 mm (66.3 in) (01); 1,995 mm (78.5 in) (X2)
- Curb weight: 1,450–2,320 kg (3,197–5,115 lb)

The Matrix 01 (Chinese: 橙仕01) is a battery electric van produced by the Chinese automaker Matrix Motors since 2020.

== Overview ==
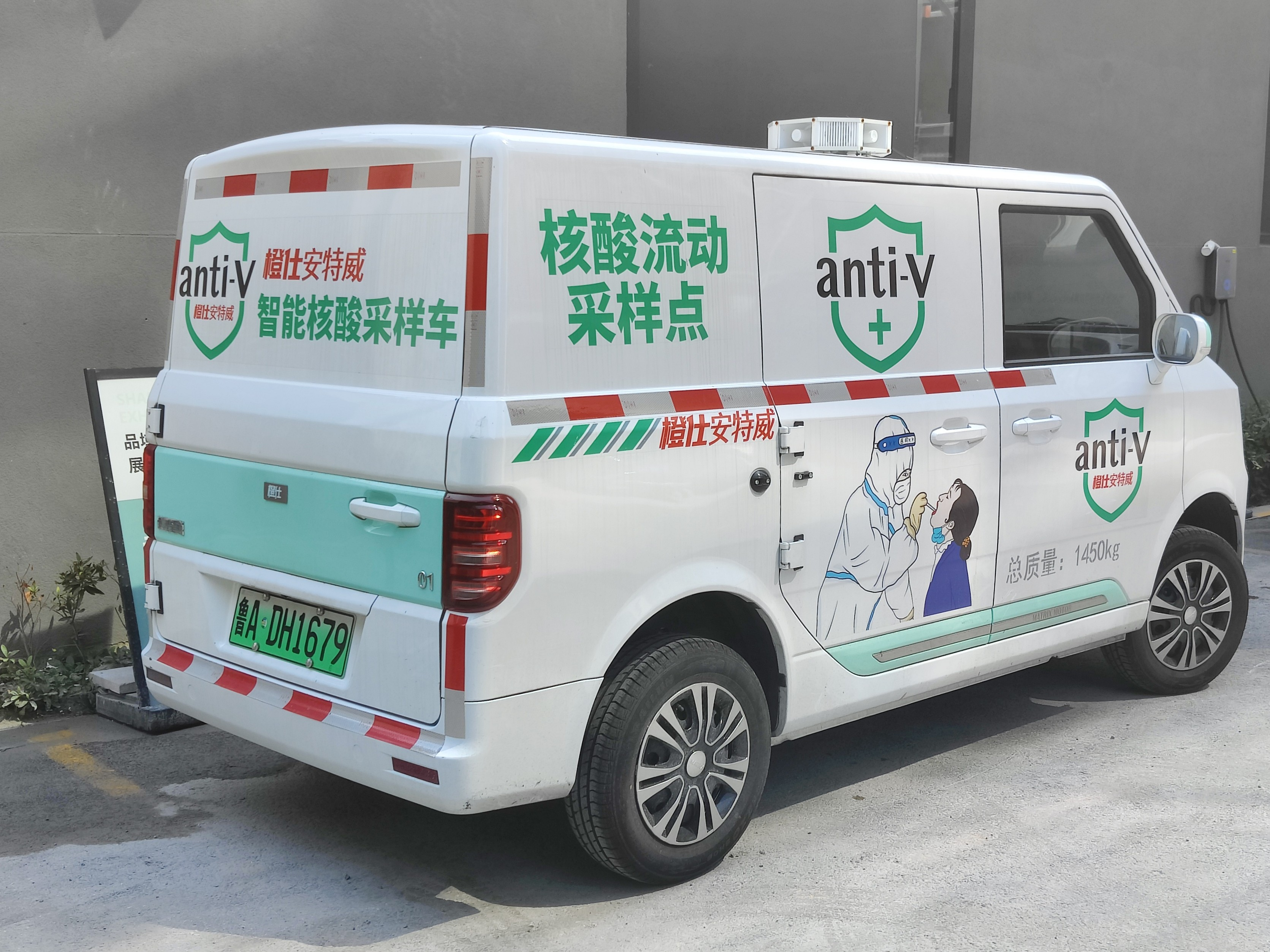
Rear view

The Matrix 01 is a fully electric urban logistics microvan by Chengshi, specially designed for the needs of urban logistics and distribution. Three variants of the vehicle are available, with the Matrix 01 being the microvan variant from 2020 and the Matrix X2 is offered as a 2-door single cab pickup and a 3-door crew cab pickup variant from 2022.

== Specifications ==
The Matrix 01 is powered by a single electric motor developing 20 hp and 90 Nm. Two battery options are available, with a 10.36 kWh ternary li-ion battery for 120 kilometers of range and a 20.72 kWh ternary li-ion battery for 220 kilometers of range. Prices starts from 46,665 RMB.

== Matrix X2/X5 ==
The Matrix X2 was launched in 2022 shares the same powertrain while the electric motor developing 20 hp has the torque tuned up to 105 Nm. Battery options are also shared with the Matrix 01 with a 10.36 kWh battery for 110 kilometers of range and the 20.72 kWh battery for 200 kilometers of range. The Matrix X2 has a body-on-frame chassis and is rear-wheel drive. Prices for the Matrix X2 ranges from 46,600 RMB to 59,800 RMB ($7,365 to 9,452). A longer variant was added later called the Matrix X5 with lengths up to 4.96 meters.

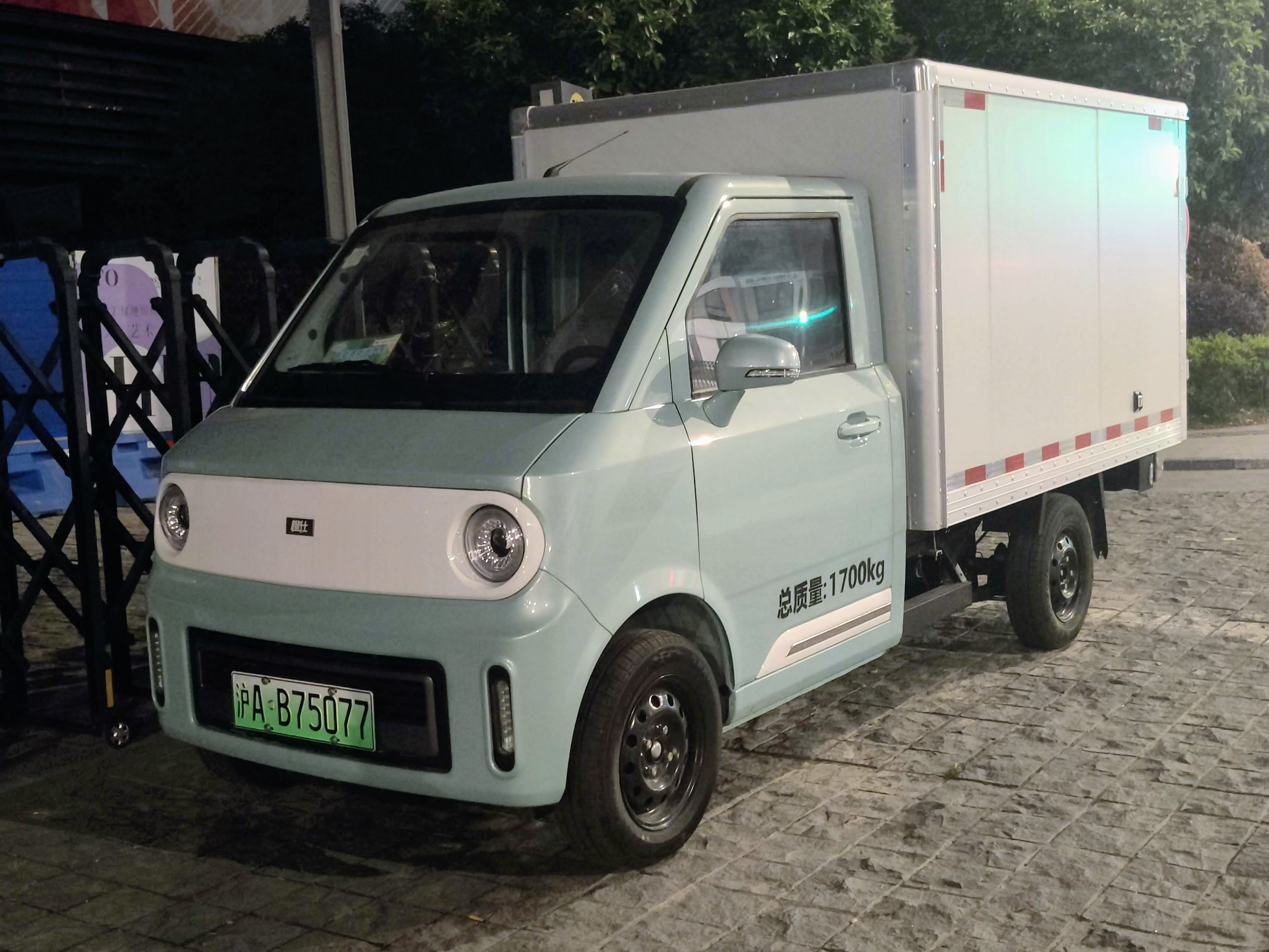
Matrix X2/X5

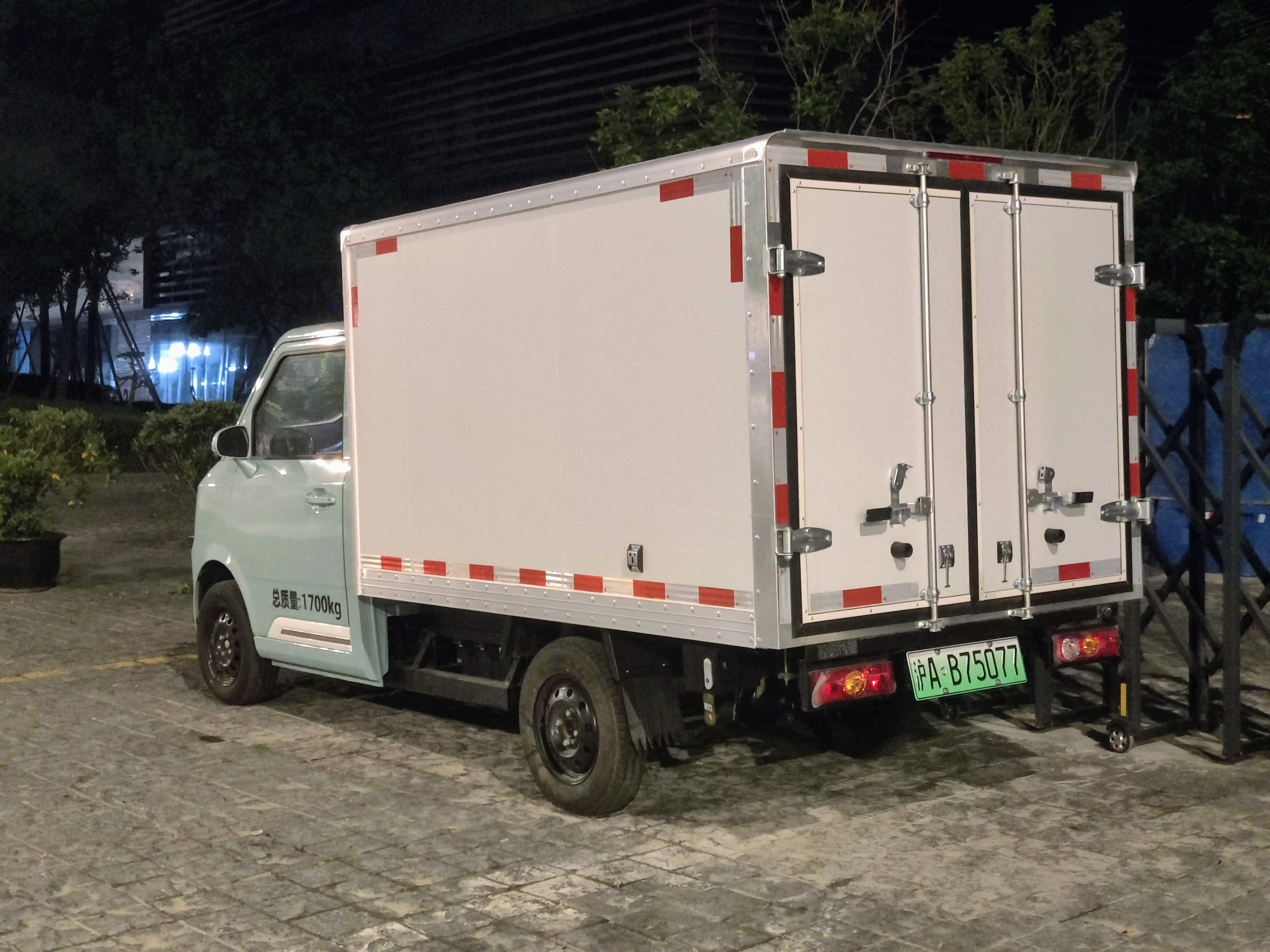
Rear view
