= Manuel Aguilar =

Manuel Aguilar may refer to:

- Manuel Ángel Aguilar Belda (born 1949), Spanish politician
- Manuel Aguilar y Bustamante (1750–1819), Salvadorian ecclesiastic
- Manuel Aguilar Chacón (1797–1846), head of state of Costa Rica from April 1837 to March 1838
