= José Óscar Aguilar González =

Mexican politician

- Born: 27 December 1957 (age 68); Puebla, Mexico
- Occupation: Politician
- Political party: PRI

José Óscar Aguilar González (born 27 December 1957) is a Mexican politician from the Institutional Revolutionary Party (PRI). He has been elected to the Chamber of Deputies for Puebla's 4th district on two occasions: in the 1997 mid-terms, to the 57th Congress, and in the 2009 mid-terms, to the 61st Congress.
