= José Aguilar (baseball) =

Mexican baseball player (born 1990)

Charros de Jalisco – No. 87
- Outfielder
- Born: May 19, 1990 (age 36); Maravatío, Michoacán, Mexico
- Bats: Right Throws: Right
- Stats at Baseball Reference

José Juan Aguilar Mendoza (born May 19, 1990) is a Mexican professional baseball outfielder for the Charros de Jalisco of the Mexican League. Aguilar was selected for the Mexico national baseball team at the 2017 World Baseball Classic and 2019 exhibition games against Japan.

== Career ==
=== Broncos de Reynosa ===
On May 11, 2010, Aguilar was assigned to the Broncos de Reynosa of the Mexican League. He played for the Broncos through the 2014 season.

=== Leones de Yucatán ===
On February 24, 2015, Aguilar was assigned to the Leones de Yucatán. Aguilar did not play in a game in 2020 due to the cancellation of the Mexican League season because of the COVID-19 pandemic.

In 2022, he played in 63 games for Yucatán, batting .276/.365/.346 with 1 home run and 15 RBI. Aguilar won the Mexican League Championship with the Leones in 2022.

=== El Águila de Veracruz ===
On March 4, 2023, Aguilar was traded to El Águila de Veracruz of the Mexican League for Carlos Stiff Rodríguez. In 74 games for Veracruz, he batted .280/.382/.364 with 4 home runs, 24 RBI, and 7 stolen bases.

=== Piratas de Campeche ===
On November 21, 2023, Aguilar was selected by the Dorados de Chihuahua in the team's expansion draft. However, on April 11, 2024, he signed with the Piratas de Campeche of the Mexican League. In 29 games for Campeche, he batted .191/.281/.274 with one home run and eight RBI. Aguilar was released on May 27, 2024.

=== Saraperos de Saltillo ===
On May 31, 2024, Aguilar signed with the Saraperos de Saltillo of the Mexican League. In 36 games for Saltillo, he slashed .305/.437/.390 with two home runs and five RBI.

=== Charros de Jalisco ===
On October 18, 2024, Aguilar was traded to the Charros de Jalisco of the Mexican League in exchange for Maikel Serrano.
