= San José Chiapa =

Coordinates: 19°15′N 97°46′W

- Municipality and town
- Coat of arms

- Location of the municipality in Puebla
- Country: Mexico
- State: Puebla
- Time zone: UTC-6 (Zona Centro)

San José Chiapa is a town and municipality in the Mexican state of Puebla.

== Economy ==
Audi has a car factory near the town, with a capacity of 150,000 units per year, including the Q5. Engines are imported from Germany. Most of the finished cars are transported by rail, but 13-17 trucks per day are also used. About half of the cars are exported to Europe through Veracruz, while Lázaro Cárdenas is used for cars and parts to United States, China, and India.
