= José Alberto Aguilar Iñárritu =

Mexican economist and politician

- Born: José Alberto Aguilar e Iñárritu; 11 April 1954 (age 72); La Paz, Baja California Sur, Mexico
- Occupations: Economist and politician
- Political party: PRI

José Alberto Aguilar e Iñárritu (born 11 April 1954) is a Mexican economist and politician affiliated with the Institutional Revolutionary Party. He served as Deputy of the LIX Legislature of the Mexican Congress as a plurinominal representative.

He served as technical secretary of the Gulf of Mexico Governors Conference and the Binational Commission for Tabasco-Petén Border Development. He represented Tabasco at the Binational Governors Coalition for Ethanol and the World Association of Energy Cities. He served as an advisor to The Washington Center for the Governor's Initiative Program in Washington, DC, and as an advisor to UNICEF on Local Government and Program Development for the Conference on the Rights of the Child. He worked at the Center for Economic and Demographic Studies at the Colegio de México, was coordinator of the "Espinosa de los Monteros" Archive Collection at the Department of Historical Research at the INAH (National Institute of Archaeology and History). He is president of Regiones AC, a Development Foundation, and a member of the Biarritz Forum and the Berkeley Group: US-Mexico Futures Forum.

His notable works include "Mexico on the Third Way: Toward a New Pact of Diversity," "Fertility, Economy, and Society: A Statistical Study of Their Correlation in Mexico and Central America 1960-1980," and his essay "Toward the Construction of a New Political Regime of Democracy in Mexico: Cabinet Government." He has also published several articles in various journals.

He has lectured at universities and forums in Mexico, the United States, France, England, China, Spain, India, Colombia, the Dominican Republic, Ecuador, and Brazil, among other countries, and participates as an analyst in various media outlets on topics such as governance, democracy, the electoral system, justice, human rights, and international relations.
