= Chignautla =

Coordinates: 19°50′N 97°23′W

- Municipality and town
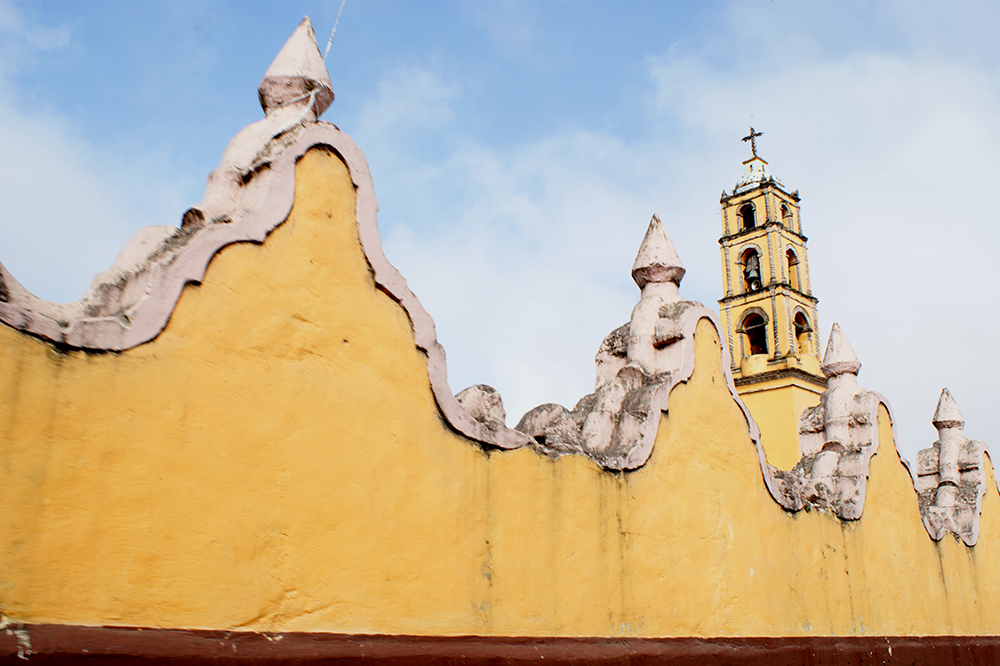

- Coat of arms

- Location of the municipality in Puebla
- Country: Mexico
- State: Puebla
- Time zone: UTC-6 (Zona Centro)

Chignautla is a town and municipality of the Mexican state of Puebla.
