= José Aguilar (footballer) =

Spanish footballer (born 2001)

Personal information
- Full name: José Aguilar Martinez
- Date of birth: 5 February 2001 (age 25)
- Place of birth: Almería, Spain
- Height: 1.72 m (5 ft 8 in)
- Position: Midfielder

Youth career
- 2016–2019: Sion

Senior career*
| Years | Team | Apps | (Gls) |
| 2019–2023 | Sion U21 | 84 | (6) |
| 2019–2023 | Sion | 7 | (0) |
- * Club domestic league appearances and goals as of 5 June 2023

José Aguilar Martinez (born 5 February 2001) is a Spanish professional footballer who plays as a midfielder.

== Professional career ==
Aguilar moved to Switzerland at the age of 15, and shortly after joined the youth academy of Sion. Aguilar made his professional debut with Sion. He worked his way up their youth categories, in 2018 having reached the U18s and then their U21s. He made his senior debut in a 1–0 Swiss Super League loss to Thun on 25 May 2019.
