= José Marcos Aguilar Moreno =

Mexican politician

- Born: 19 March 1934 (age 92); Mexico City, Mexico
- Occupation: Politician
- Political party: PAN

José Marcos Aguilar Moreno (born 19 March 1934) is a Mexican politician from the National Action Party (PAN). In the 2000 general election he was elected to the Chamber of Deputies to serve as a plurinominal deputy (fifth region) during the 58th session of Congress.
