= Teresa Aguilar Suro =

Mexican watercolorist, painter, and gallery director

Teresa Aguilar Suro (1931–2017) was a Mexican watercolorist, painter, and gallery director.

Aguilar-Suro was born in 1931 in Guadalajara, Jalisco, Mexico. She studied art at Academy of San Carlos in Mexico City for three years during the 1950s. She was formally the director of Galería del Claustro de Sor Juana. She was an active member of the Mexican Society of Watercolor Artists (Sociedad Mexicana de Acuarelistas). Her artwork is included in the permanent collection at Banco Nacional de Mexico.
