= Samuel Ramírez Moreno =

Mexican psychiatrist (1898–1951)

Samuel Ramírez Moreno (1898 – 12 April 1951) was a Mexican physician and psychiatrist. He served as a professor and rector (1944) at the National Autonomous University of Mexico (UNAM).

== Education ==
Ramírez began his studies at the American School and received his undergraduate degree in 1907 at the National Preparatory School. He joined the National School of Medicine in 1918, earning his degree in 1924.
