= 1st federal electoral district of Puebla =

Federal electoral district of Mexico

Puebla's 1st
- Electoral district of the Chamber of Deputies of Mexico

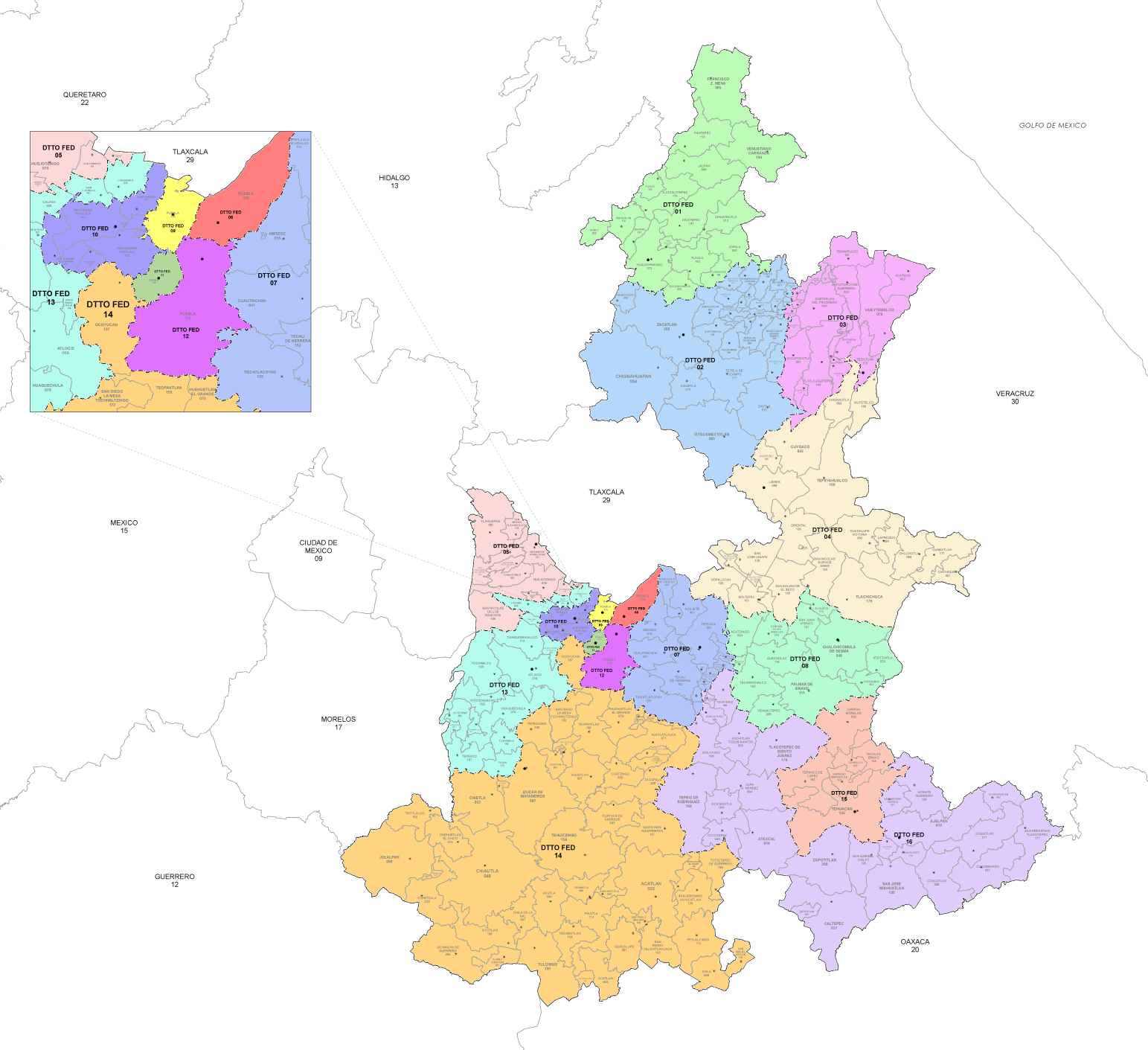
- 1st district since 2023

Incumbent
- Member: Gissel Santander Soto
- Party: ▌Morena
- Congress: 66th (2024–2027)

District
- State: Puebla
- Head town: Huauchinango de Degollado
- Coordinates: 20°11′N 98°03′W
- Covers: 17 municipalities: Chiconcuautla, Honey, Francisco Z. Mena, Huauchinango, Jalpan, Jopala, Juan Galindo, Naupan, Pahuatlán, Pantepec, Tlacuilotepec, Tlaola, Tlapacoya, Tlaxco, Venustiano Carranza, Xicotepec, Zihuateutla
- PR region: Fourth
- Precincts: 195
- Population: 397,252 (2020 census)
- Indigenous: Yes (57%)

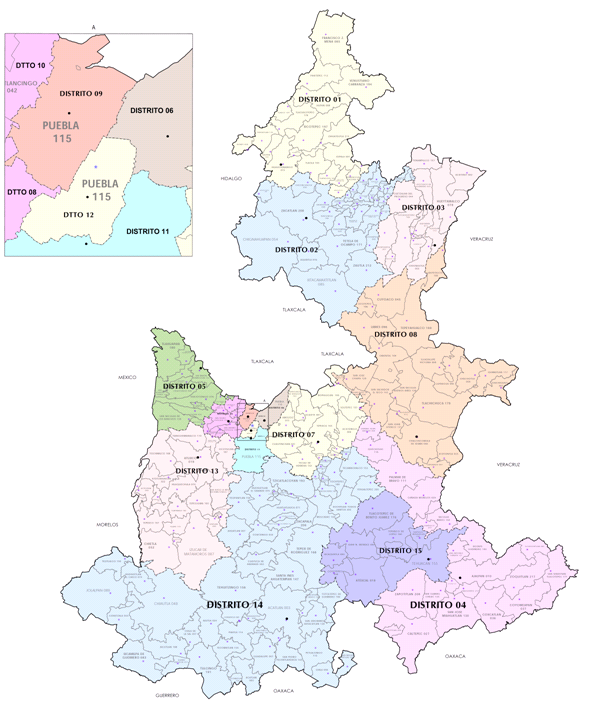
Puebla's districts in 2017–2022

The 1st federal electoral district of Puebla (Spanish: Distrito electoral federal 01 de Puebla) is one of the 300 electoral districts into which Mexico is divided for elections to the federal Chamber of Deputies and one of 16 such districts in the state of Puebla.

It elects one deputy to the lower house of Congress for each three-year legislative session by means of the first-past-the-post system. Votes cast in the district also count towards the calculation of proportional representation ("plurinominal") deputies elected from the fourth region.

The current member for the district, elected in the 2024 general election, is Gissel Santander Soto of the National Regeneration Movement (Morena).

== District territory ==
Under the 2023 districting plan adopted by the National Electoral Institute (INE), which is to be used for the 2024, 2027 and 2030 federal elections, Puebla's congressional seat allocation rose from 15 to 16. The first district is in Puebla's Sierra Norte region in the extreme north of the state and covers 195 electoral precincts (secciones electorales) across 17 of the state's municipalities:

- Chiconcuautla, Honey, Francisco Z. Mena, Huauchinango, Jalpan, Jopala, Juan Galindo, Naupan, Pahuatlán, Pantepec, Tlacuilotepec, Tlaola, Tlapacoya, Tlaxco, Venustiano Carranza, Xicotepec and Zihuateutla.

The head town (cabecera distrital), where results from individual polling stations are gathered together and tallied, is the city of Huauchinango de Degollado. The district reported a population of 397,252 in the 2020 census and, with Indigenous and Afrodescendent inhabitants accounting for over 57% of that total, it is classified by the INE as an indigenous district. (Note: Total inhabitants, not voters. The INE deems any local or federal electoral district where Indigenous or Afrodescendent inhabitants number 40% or more of the population to be an indigenous district.)

== Previous districting schemes ==
Evolution of electoral district numbers
	1974	1978	1996	2005	2017	2023
Puebla	10	14	15	16	15	16
Chamber of Deputies	196	300				

2017–2022

From 2017 to 2022, when Puebla was assigned 15 congressional seats, the 1st district's head town was at Huauchinango and it covered 19 municipalities.

2005–2017

Under the 2005 plan, the district was one of 16 in Puebla. Its head town was at Huauchinango and it covered 16 municipalities.

1996–2005

Between 1996 and 2005, Puebla had 15 districts. The 1st covered 16 municipalities, with its head town at Huauchinango.

1978–1996

The districting scheme in force from 1978 to 1996 was the result of the 1977 electoral reforms, which increased the number of single-member seats in the Chamber of Deputies from 196 to 300. Under that plan, Puebla's seat allocation rose from 10 to 14. The district's head town was the state capital, Puebla, and it covered parts of the city and of its surrounding municipality.

== Deputies returned to Congress ==
(Mexico) National parties
- Current
- PAN
- PRI
- PT
- PVEM
- MC
- Morena
- PAZ
- Somos
- Defunct or local only
- PLM
- PNR
- PRM
- PNM
- PP
- PPS
- PARM
- PFCRN
- CON
- PANAL
- PSD
- PES
- PES
- PRD

Puebla's 1st district
Election	Deputy	Party	Term	Legislature
1916	Salvador R. Guzmán		1916–1917	Constituent Congress of Querétaro
...
1940	Martín Torres		1940–1943	38th Congress
1943	Gustavo Díaz Ordaz	Institutional Revolutionary Party	1943–1946	39th Congress
1946	Blas Chumacero	Institutional Revolutionary Party	1946–1949	40th Congress
1949	Francisco Márquez Ramos	Institutional Revolutionary Party	1949–1952	41st Congress
1952	Blas Chumacero	Institutional Revolutionary Party	1952–1955	42nd Congress
1955	Salvador Lobato Jiménez	Institutional Revolutionary Party	1955–1958	43rd Congress
1958	Blas Chumacero	Institutional Revolutionary Party	1958–1961	44th Congress
1961	Francisco Márquez Ramos	Institutional Revolutionary Party	1961–1964	45th Congress
1964	Melquíades Trejo Hernández	Institutional Revolutionary Party	1964–1967	46th Congress
1967	Blas Chumacero	Institutional Revolutionary Party	1967–1970	47th Congress
1970	Melquíades Trejo Hernández	Institutional Revolutionary Party	1970–1973	48th Congress
1973	Miguel Fernández del Campo Machorro	National Action Party (Mexico)	1973–1976	49th Congress
1976	Nicolás Pérez Pavón	Institutional Revolutionary Party	1976–1979	50th Congress
1979	Ángel Aceves Saucedo	Institutional Revolutionary Party	1979–1982	51st Congress
1982	Hilda Luisa Valdemar Lima	Institutional Revolutionary Party	1982–1985	52nd Congress
1985	Blas Chumacero Sánchez	Institutional Revolutionary Party	1985–1988	53rd Congress
1988	Víctor Manuel Carreto Fernández	Institutional Revolutionary Party	1988–1991	54th Congress
1991	Raúl Pardo Villafaña	Institutional Revolutionary Party	1991–1994	55th Congress
1994	Héctor González Reyes	Institutional Revolutionary Party	1994–1997	56th Congress
1997	Enoé González Cabrera	Institutional Revolutionary Party	1997–2000	57th Congress
2000	Narciso Alberto Amador Leal	Institutional Revolutionary Party	2000–2003	58th Congress
2003	Fidel René Meza Cabrera (Note: Meza Cabrera declared himself an independent on 26 June 2006.)	Institutional Revolutionary Party Independent politician	2003–2006	59th Congress
2006	Narciso Alberto Amador Leal	Institutional Revolutionary Party	2006–2009	60th Congress
2009	Ardelio Vargas Fosado (Note: Vargas Fosado resigned his seat on 1 February 2011 and was replaced for the remainder of his term by his alternate, Urzúa Rivera.); Ricardo Urzúa Rivera	Institutional Revolutionary Party	2009–2011; 2011–2012	61st Congress
2012	Laura Guadalupe Vargas Vargas	Institutional Revolutionary Party	2012–2015	62nd Congress
2015	Carlos Barragán Amador	Institutional Revolutionary Party	2015–2018	63rd Congress
2018	Miguel Acundo González (Note: Acundo González died on 15 September 2020 and was replaced for the remainder of his term by his alternate, Esquitín Alonso.); José Francisco Esquitín Alonso	Social Encounter Party	2018–2020; 2020–2021	64th Congress
2021	Marco Antonio Natale Gutiérrez	Ecologist Green Party of Mexico	2021–2024	65th Congress
2024	Gissel Santander Soto	National Regeneration Movement	2024–2027	66th Congress

== Presidential elections ==
Puebla's 1st district
Election	District won by	Party or coalition	%
2018	Andrés Manuel López Obrador	Juntos Haremos Historia	47.2516
2024	Claudia Sheinbaum Pardo	Sigamos Haciendo Historia	66.4814
