= Huasteca =

Geographical and cultural region of Mexico

Coordinates: 21°58′25″N 99°4′9″W

Téenek
- People: Huastec
- Language: Huastec
- Country: Huasteca

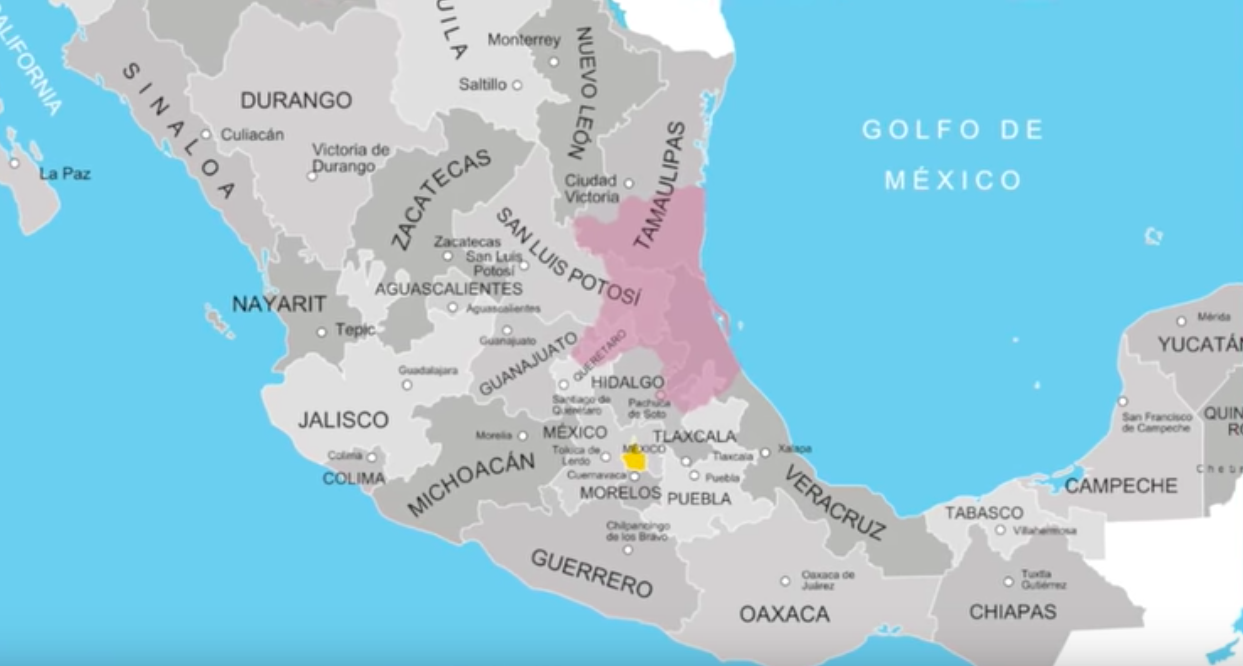
Map of La Huasteca in Mexico.

La Huasteca (Nahuatl languages: Cuextecapan) is a geographical and cultural region located partially along the Gulf of Mexico and including parts of the states of Veracruz, Tamaulipas, Hidalgo and San Luis Potosí. It is roughly defined as the area in which the Huastec people had influence when their civilization was at its height during the Mesoamerican period. Today, the Huastecs occupy only a fraction of this region with the Nahua people now the most numerous indigenous group. However, those who live in the region share a number of cultural traits such as a style of music and dance, along with religious festivals such as Xantolo.

== Geography and environment ==
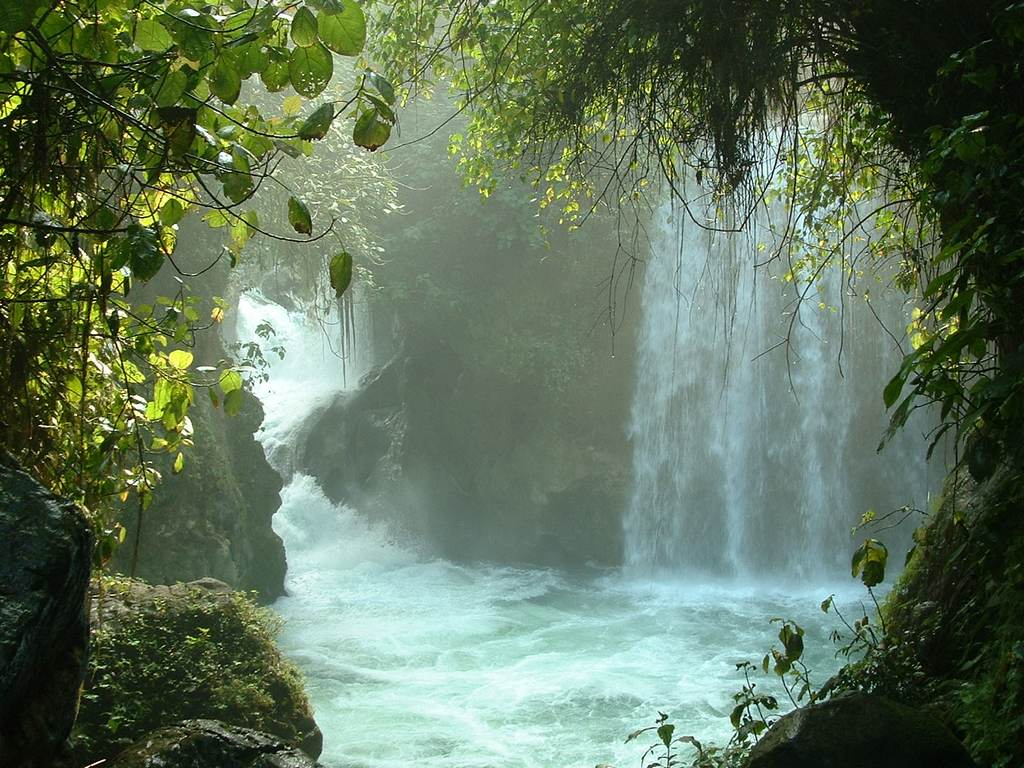
Tamasopo waterfall in San Luis Potosí.

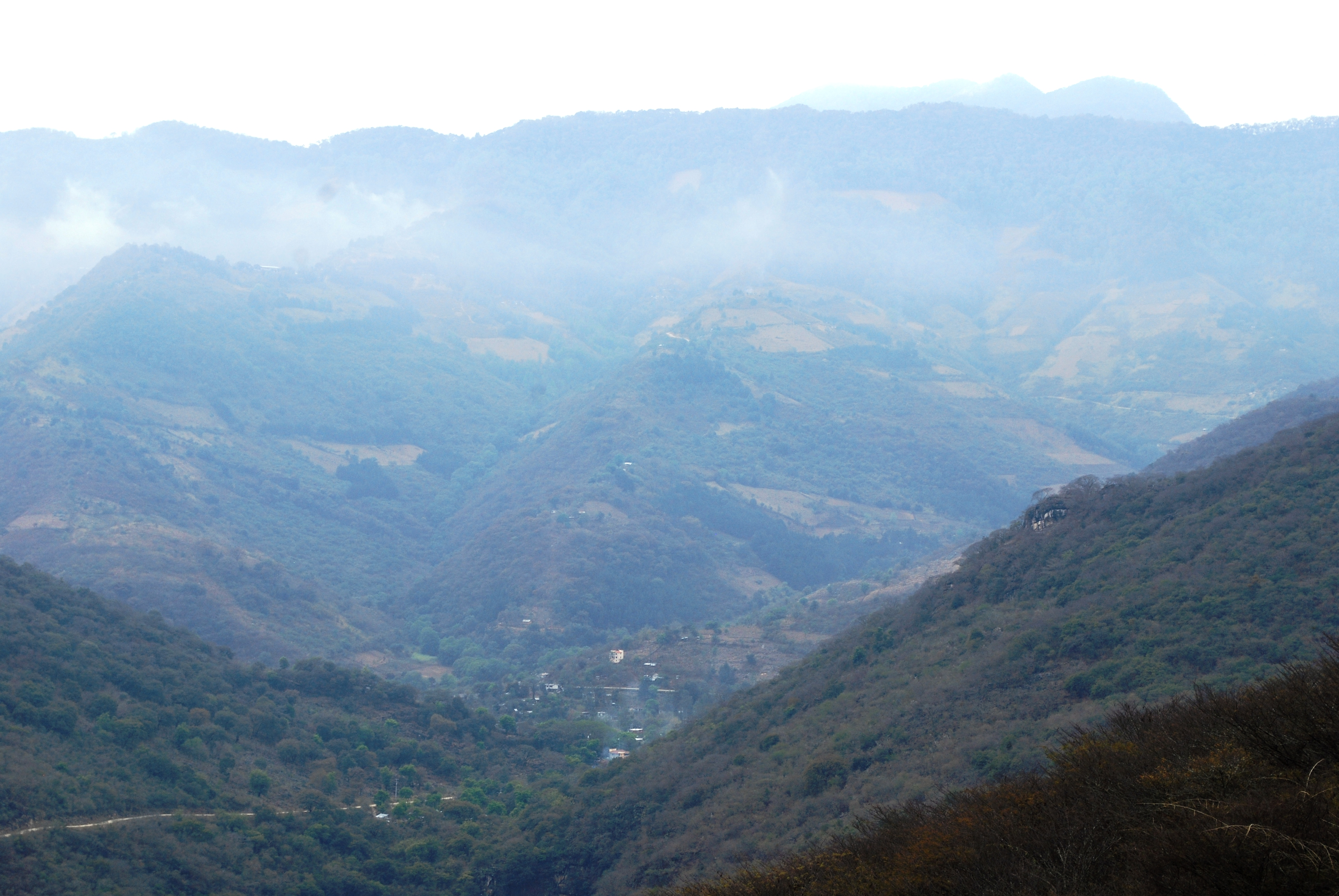
Landscape near Jalpan de Serra in Querétaro.

Historically and ethnically, the Huasteca region is defined by the area dominated by the Huastecs at their height. The actual extension of the region is somewhat disputed as well as how it should be sub-divided. Geographically it has been defined as from the Sierra Madre Oriental to the Gulf of Mexico with the Sierra de Tamaulipas as the north border and the Cazones River as the south. It extends over the south of Tamaulipas, the southeast of San Luis Potosí, the northeast of Querétaro and Hidalgo and the extreme north of Veracruz and Puebla and a very small portion of Guanajuato over an area of about 32,000km2.

To the north and east there are relative flatlands. To the south there are hills of calcified sand. Basalt from old lava flows penetrate the primarily sedimentary rock from the west and appear with wind and water erosion. The higher mountain areas to the west often have tall peaks in capricious forms with steep slopes and eight fast running rivers. Highways in the region tend to be small and winding, especially in the higher elevations in San Luis Potosí and Hidalgo. Most of these rivers eventually empty into either the Pánuco or the Cazones Rivers with the zone belonging to the Pánuco, Tuxpan and Cazones River basins, all of which empty into the Gulf of Mexico. As much of the rock is easily eroded, the mountain areas are filled with caves and other underground openings. The best known of this is the Sótano de las Golondrinas (the 'Cave of Swallows') just north of Xilitla. It is famous for the large number of birds (mostly white-collared swifts and green parakeets, not swallows) that emerge from the opening in the morning. It is also a site for base-jumping down the sink's 372-metre (1,220 ft) depth. The birds return en masse again at nightfall. Many of the rivers run clear or turquoise blue in deep ravines or canyons and form waterfalls. The tallest of these is the Tamul, which is 300 meters wide and 105 meters tall. It joins the waters of the Gallinas River with those of the Santa Maria River to form the Tampaon River. Another important waterfall is the Tamasopo and at the Nacimiento del Río Huichihuayán (source of the Huichihuayán River) near the village of the same name, the water comes out of the mountains, forming pools large enough for swimming.

It is one of the most bio-diverse regions in Mexico, with over 2,000 species of plants. This diversity also extends into agricultural crops with local corn varieties resistant to drought. This area is mostly dominated by tropical rainforest, some of which is still semi-virgin with a hot humid climate with some areas of pine-holm oak forest in the highest elevations and arid bush and grassland in a few isolated areas. The Veracruz moist forests ecoregion encompasses the lowlands and foothills. Tropical forests have species such as Ceiba pentandra or other kapok, Mexican cedar, Mexican ebony (Harvardia mexicana, Ebenopsis ebano and species of Diospyros may all be called ébano), with palm species more common on the coastline. Tall growth perennial rainforest dominates in the states of Hidalgo and Veracruz with medium grown semi deciduous rainforest in San Luis Potosí. It also has a large number of species of algae, more diverse and of different types than those found in other parts of Mexico. It is also rich in wildlife such as parrots, macaws, spider monkeys, owls, eagles, toucans, deer, jaguar, wild boar and raccoons with various species of reptiles and insects.

The Sierra Madre Oriental pine–oak forests ecoregion covers the higher slopes of the Sierra Madre, and includes oak forests and pockets of cloud forest at middle elevations, and pine–oak forests and pine forests at higher elevations. South of the Moctezuma River, the Veracruz montane forests form a continuous belt of montane moist forests and cloud forests at middle elevations of the Sierra.

The main city in the SLP section is Ciudad Valles, founded by Nuño Beltrán de Guzmán in 1533. The most important city in the Hidalgo portion is Huejutla. Other important population centers include Tantoyuca, Tamazunchale and Chicontepec.

One section of the Huasteca is called the Sierra Gorda, which is centered on northern Querétaro, but extends into Hidalgo and Guanajuato.

=== Huasteca veracruzana ===
In the state of Veracruz, it is located towards the north end, from the Cazones River to the Tamesí river. It is subdivided into two regions: Huasteca Alta and Huasteca Baja. Its relief is flat and low hills and its tropical climate. It is irrigated by several rivers and lagoons, among which the Tuxpan River and the Tamiahua Lagoon stand out; the most important city of the Huasteca Veracruzana is the city and port of Tuxpan. One of its most important archaeological sites is the castle of Teayo. The Huasteca Veracruzana is the most extensive in the territory, and famous for the variety of its dishes, which in addition to the traditional throughout the region, such as zacahuil (a large tamale of broken corn) is complemented with fish and seafood typical of coastal Veracruz, the music and sounds together with the costumes are also part of it.

=== Huasteca queretana ===
The Huasteca queretana is located in the northwest part of the state and is an extension of the San Joaquín areas of Aguazarca. It includes the municipalities of Arroyo Seco, Jalpan and Landa.

=== Huasteca hidalguense ===
The Huasteca hidalguense comprises the following municipalities: Atlapexco, Huautla, Huazalingo, Huejutla de Reyes, Jaltocán, San Felipe Orizatlán, Xochiatipan and Yahualica.

=== Huasteca poblana ===
The Huasteca poblana is located to the south of the border zone of the Huasteca, and includes, among others, the municipalities of Francisco Z. Mena, Pantepec, Venustiano Carranza, Jalpan, Tlaxco, Tlacuilotepec, Xicotepec de Juárez, Pahuatlán and Naupan.

=== Huasteca potosina ===
The eastern quarter of the state of San Luis Potosí is known as the Huasteca potosina. It is constituted by 20 municipalities which are: Aquismon, Axtla de Terrazas, Cd. Valles, Coxcatlan, Ébano, El Naranjo, Huehuetlan, Matlapa, San Antonio, San Martin Chalchicuautla, San Vicente Tancuayalab, Tamasopo, Tamazunchale, Tampacan, Tampamolon, Tamuin, Tancanhuitz de Santos, Tanlajas, Tanquián de Escobedo, Xilitla.

=== Huasteca tamaulipeca ===
The region, also called the "south coast", borders on the north of Veracruz. It includes the municipalities of Mante, Xicoténcatl, Ocampo, Gómez Farías, Nuevo Morelos, Antiguo Morelos, Aldama, Tampico and Ciudad Madero.

The municipality of Tampico houses a collection of archaeological artifacts from the region in its Museum of Huasteca Culture; the collection includes ceramic pieces, textiles, figures and various objects belonging to the Huastec culture.

=== Huasteca guanajuatense ===
It is located in the northeast of the state around the municipality of San Luis de la Paz.

== Climate ==
The region is relative lowlands with a hot climate at the extreme north of the Mexico's tropical Gulf coast. Most of the region is hot and humid with annual temperatures generally varying between 22 and 26 °C. The three most common Koppen classifications that appear here are Am(f), Am and Am(w). Rainfall is generally abundant due to moisture from the Gulf of Mexico. Rainfall amounts vary between 800 and 1600mm per year, depending on altitude and location from the coast. However, the area is subject to drought three out of every ten years, causing problems for local agriculture. Localized hail and hurricanes are an annual occurrence.

== History ==
The term Huastec is derived from the Nahuatl name for the ethnicity, Cuextecah. The Huastecs were the northernmost Mesoamerican group on the Gulf coast, and their contact with the Chichimeca led to Aridoamerican influences in their culture. The pre-Hispanic sculpture of the region is distinct, with well-known pieces such as the "Adolescente de Tamuín" and the goddess of life and health Tlazolteotl. Traditionally crops here have been corn, beans, squash, various chili peppers and tubers such as yucca, camotes and jicamas. However, gathering of wild foods played a more important role here in the Mesoamerican period, especially roots, small chili peppers and a fruit (Brosimum alicastrum) as well as fish from lakes, rivers and ocean. The production of salt was important at Chila Lake.

The Huastecs are probably what remain of Mayan expansion northward up the Veracruz coast but were "left behind" after other Mayan groups retreated south and east. The Huastecs began to be culturally dominant in their region between 750 and 800 CE after El Tajín waned. From then to the 15th century, they expanded their territory and influence from the Tuxpan River to Tamiahua with most settlements along the banks of the Huayalejo-Tamesí River, along the northern Veracruz and southern Tamaulipas coast and west into the Sierra Madre Oriental. The culture was influential even farther west into northern Querétaro, and there may have been Huastec settlements into what is now northern Puebla. Notable settlements include El Tamuín in San Luis Potosí, Yahualica and Huejutla in Hidalgo, Tzicóac on the Veracruz/Puebla border as well as Tuxpan, Temapache, Pánuco, and Tanhuijo in Veracruz.

Although the Huastecs built small cities and ceremonial centers, they never reached the size and complexity of others in Mesoamerica. Politically, they remained divided in small chiefdoms. The northern areas were constantly threatened by the Chichimeca, which may be the origin for the traditional “Comanche” dance found in the region. In the postclassic, Huastec territory began to shrink. In the west and south of their territory, there were enclaves of Nahuas, Tepehuas, Totonacs and Otomis. The Totonacs and Tepehuas in the region probably arrived around the same time as the Huastecs, while the Otomis and Nahuas arrived later. However, the timeline for these migrations is disputed. One Nahua incursion occurs in 800 CE related to Tula and another in the 15th century due to the expansion of the Aztec Empire. The Aztecs conquered from the south and west to an area they called Chicoaque or Tzicoac in 1458, which was probably Mesa de Cacahuatengo in the municipality of Ixhuatlán de Madero. The Huasteca was rich in resources that interested the Aztecs like rubber, bark cloth, turtle shells, animal skins, feathers and shells.

The first European contact with the Huasteca region was in 1498, when Italian Amerigo Vespucci, (or some European), sailing along the Tropic of Cancer, landed somewhere north of present-day Soto la Marina, and the Rio Grande river. (The Tropic of Cancer constantly moves South in 522 years). This explorer enjoyed friendly relations with the Huastecans, and wrote extensively about them. Including the Huastec word for Señores, and art work. His are the only written, eyewitness descriptions known of the civilization. Spanish conquistadores later explored the Pánuco River area. After the Conquest, Gonzalo de Sandoval burned alive about 460 nobles and chiefs in the region and captured about 20,000 natives to sell as slaves in the Antilles. The first evangelists in the area were the Franciscans around 1530, with the Augustinians arriving in 1533, with the first large efforts in Pahuatlán, Puebla and Chicontepec. The area initially was under the Bishopric of Tlaxcala. But evangelization was slow, with period documents indicating that most pagan beliefs had not been extinguished well into the colonial period. One hundred and thirty encomiendas were created in the region which lasted most of the 16th century and in some cases into the 17th. Spanish dominance in the coastal areas depopulated it of most indigenous people, with the Huastecs retreating south from Tamaulipas to Panúco and Tamaulipas and with many dying in the war and from disease. The introduction of cattle into the flat areas prompted the Spanish to force the relocation of many indigenous groups in the area, sometimes with violence. Not all attempts to relocate indigenous groups were successful. There were notable failures in Hidalgo. However, its overall success managed to divide the region into new political units. Spanish policies and economic conditions forced many of the natives here to crowd together in certain areas, with Huastecs and Nahuas together in Ozuluama, Tantoyuca, Tamiahua and Tuxpan, and Nahuas and Otomis in Chicontepec and Huejutla. The new political units brought in other indigenous groups not normally part of the Huasteco, such as the Pames in the Sierra Gorda of Querétaro.

The Spanish then introduced African slaves into the area. While the indigenous populations made something of a comeback in Hidalgo and San Luis Potosí, this did not happen in Veracruz. In the later colonial period, most Huastec communities were populated by mestizos, especially along the Veracruz and Tamaulipas coast. Today, the Huastec ethnicity is found only along a narrow strip extending from far northern Querétaro to far north of Veracruz near Tamiahua.

During the colonial period, the region was divided into five provinces called “alcaldías mayores”: Huauchinango, Huayacocotla-Chichontepec, Pánuco-Tampico, Huejutla and Yahualica. In the 19th century, most of the local leaders were chosen by charisma and political skill, rather than by lineage, although elder councils were still important in most indigenous communities. By the beginning of the 19th century, the use of elections to choose leaders began to be used, but with candidates chosen by the elite. The first municipal elections in the region were held in Chicontepec and Ixhuatlan in 1813.

From the first taking of land for cattle in the colonial period to the present, land struggles have been an important part of the region's history. In the 18th century, there were various uprisings in the region such as in Ilamatlán in 1750 and Huayacocotla in 1784 in response to higher taxes and takings of land. In the mid 17th century, a system of serfdom by debt began that would reach its height in the 19th, involving indigenous, mestizo and negro peoples. During the 17th century however, some peoples were able to take possession of land under a communal scheme, declaring it the property of the Virgin Mary or of a saint to keep landholders and political chiefs from taking it. From the second half of the 17th century to the first half of the 18th, there was a consolidation of haciendas with between 21 and 25 by 1790, about eighty cattle ranches and twenty three indigenous communities. At the end of the 18th century, records indicate that ninety percent of the population was Spanish, mestizo or mixed African descent, mostly in Chicontepec, Huayacocotla, Ixhuatlan and Xochioloco. Coffee was introduced to the mountain areas in the 19th century. Land and other agrarian conflicts have continued to the present day with local elections based on land use issues.(focus) The discovery of oil in northern Veracruz has led to an area called the Faja de Oro (Gold belt) extending from Chicontepec to the Gulf coast. It has also caused environmental damage and made subsistence farming difficult to impossible in many areas. Conflicts have even led to the formation of armed groups such as the Ejercito Popular Revolucionario in the latter 20th century. Despite brokered talks and disarming, the region is conflictive, especially along the Hidalgo/Veracruz border.

The major development of the 20th century in the Huasteca was the development of roadways and other infrastructure to connect it with the rest of the country. Until the latter 20th century, many of the municipalities of the region did not have paved roads, with a few still in this situation to this day. The highways and other roads in this area have allowed for seasonal and permanent emigration out of the area by younger generations looking for work. In the 20th century, preschool and primary school were widely introduced into the area. They have included various models of instruction including bilingual and bicultural education. At higher levels, it has included distance education for middle and high school. More recently, there has been a push for especially technical education such as the Tecnológico de Huejutla and the Universidad Comunitaria de la Huasteca Norte. This has raised literacy rates as well as the ability to speak Spanish among the indigenous. It has also caused cultural changes as younger generations have access to information about the outside world.

The dream of creating the Huastec State has been regarded as a utopia for the governors of three states adjacent in century XX, who are the main opponents to the project of creation of the federal entity number 33 of the United Mexican States. For the next autumn, the civilians seeking the means to integrate as a new entity, indigenous communities, farmers and citizens directly and indirectly apriban(agrarian?) building project.

The main arguments are, the abandonment of the region by their state governments, cultural and racial integration which was divided by the region in the colonial and republican period. The reintegration of the Huasteca is considered a historic debt that it has with the indigenous peoples of the region.

== Indigenous people ==
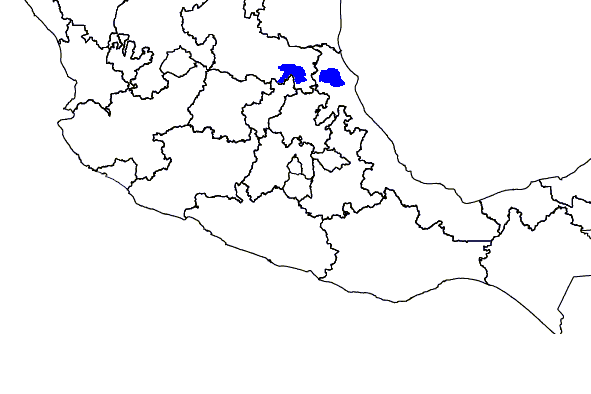
Extent of Huastec language spoken today.

La Huasteca is home to six indigenous ethnic groups with over 250,000 speakers of various indigenous languages. About 70% speak Nahuatl; 20% speak Huastec; six percent speak Otomi and about three percent speak Pame, Tepehua, or Totonac. The Nahuatl speakers of La Huasteca comprise over 27% of all Nahuatl speakers in Mexico. Indigenous communities continue to be mostly agricultural with the growing of corn being most important. Other important aspects include cattle, the processing of sugar cane and the growing of citrus as a cash crop although most of this is under the control of mestizos. While subject to municipal authorities, usually mestizo dominated, they have their own internal political and economic systems as well. The indigenous of the area face discrimination from the dominant mestizos, who call themselves “gente de razón” (people of reason) and the indigenous “compadritos” or “cuitoles” which is similar to calling them children. Catholic influence in the region has been limited since the colonial period, mostly restricted to major towns and flat areas and less in the more rugged terrain. This has allowed the indigenous of La Huasteca to maintain more of their traditions than those in other regions of Mexico.

Despite the fact that the large region is named after them, the Huastec people today only occupy a fraction of it in a strip from northwest Querétaro east towards the north of Veracruz. The largest Huastec communities are found in the mountain areas of Otontepec and Tantoyuca in Veracruz, Tancanhuitz, Tanlajas and Aquismón in San Luis Potosí. Huastecs are a Mayan people, whose language probably separated about 3,000 years ago. Their presence is here is most likely due to Mayan expansion north along the Veracruz coast until sometime between 1000 and 1500 CE, when they were forced back south, leaving the Huastec group in the far north isolated.

The name Huastec comes from Nahuatl; the Huastec call themselves Teenek. While the Huastec were the most northern Mesoamerican culture, their culture is distinct from those in the Mexican Plateau, which whom they had contact and from other Mayan groups. One reason for this was their contact with the Chichimecas to the north, and their isolation from other Mayan cultures. While the Huastecs managed to spread their influence over a large territory, they never built cities and ceremonial centers as large as in other parts of Mesoamerica. One reason for this was that the Chichimeca were a constant threat. In the postclassic period, Huastec territory shrank due to incursions by Nahuas and Otomi in the south and west, culminating into Aztec conquest of much of the territory by the early 16th century. This loss of land would continue into the Spanish colonial period with mestizos coming to dominate the region, especially in the Veracruz and Tamaulipas coast areas.

Nahua communities and the Nahuatl language are now the most dominant indigenous influence in La Huasteca, especially in the south and west of the region. The Nahuas dominate the southern part of La Huasteca in over fifty municipalities in San Luis Potosí, Hidalgo and Veracruz, such as Jaltocan and Calnali in Hidalgo, Ixhuatlán de Madero and Benito Juárez in Veracruz. It is likely that many of the Nahuas in the south of La Huasteca are descended from ethnic Huastecs who shifted to Nahuatl. There are two main dialects of Nahuatl spoken in the region. The Nahuas in the north of the region share a number of cultural traits with the Huastec and those in the south share traits with the Otomis and Tepehuas but all are considered to be part of the same Nahua subgroup. The Huasteca Nahuas in Hidalgo and San Luis Potosí have put effort into developing a shared identity in the face of land and political struggles.

The Otomis were the first to conquer the southern part of La Huastecas as they fled Nahua domination in their original home of the Toluca Valley.

It is thought that the Totonacs and Tepehuas in the region date back as far as the Huastecs. These people are found in the very far south of the region and both were conquered by the incoming Otomi as well as the Nahuas in the Mesoamerican period.

== Culture ==
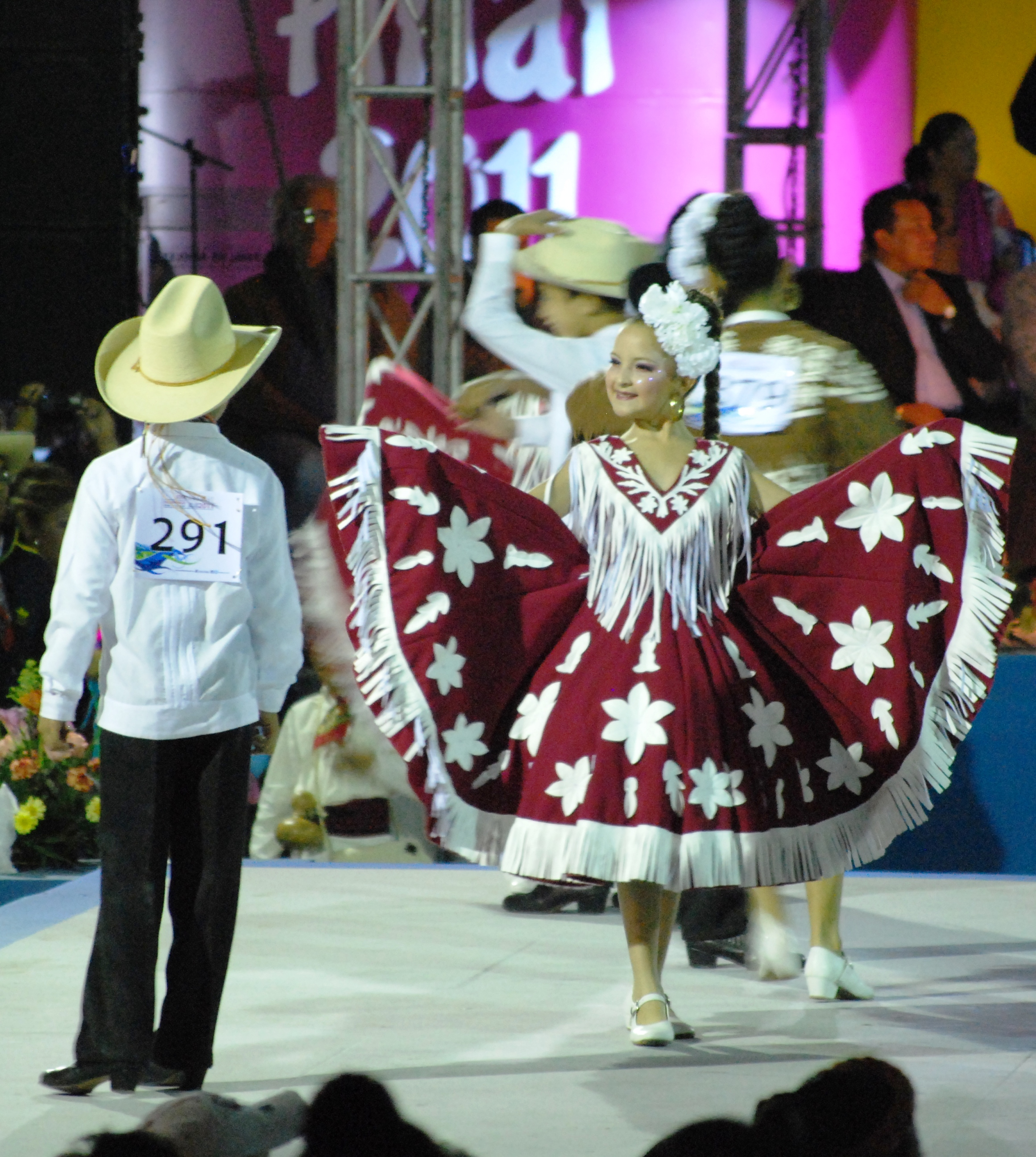
Scene from the Concurso de Danza Huapango in Pinal de Amoles, Querétaro.

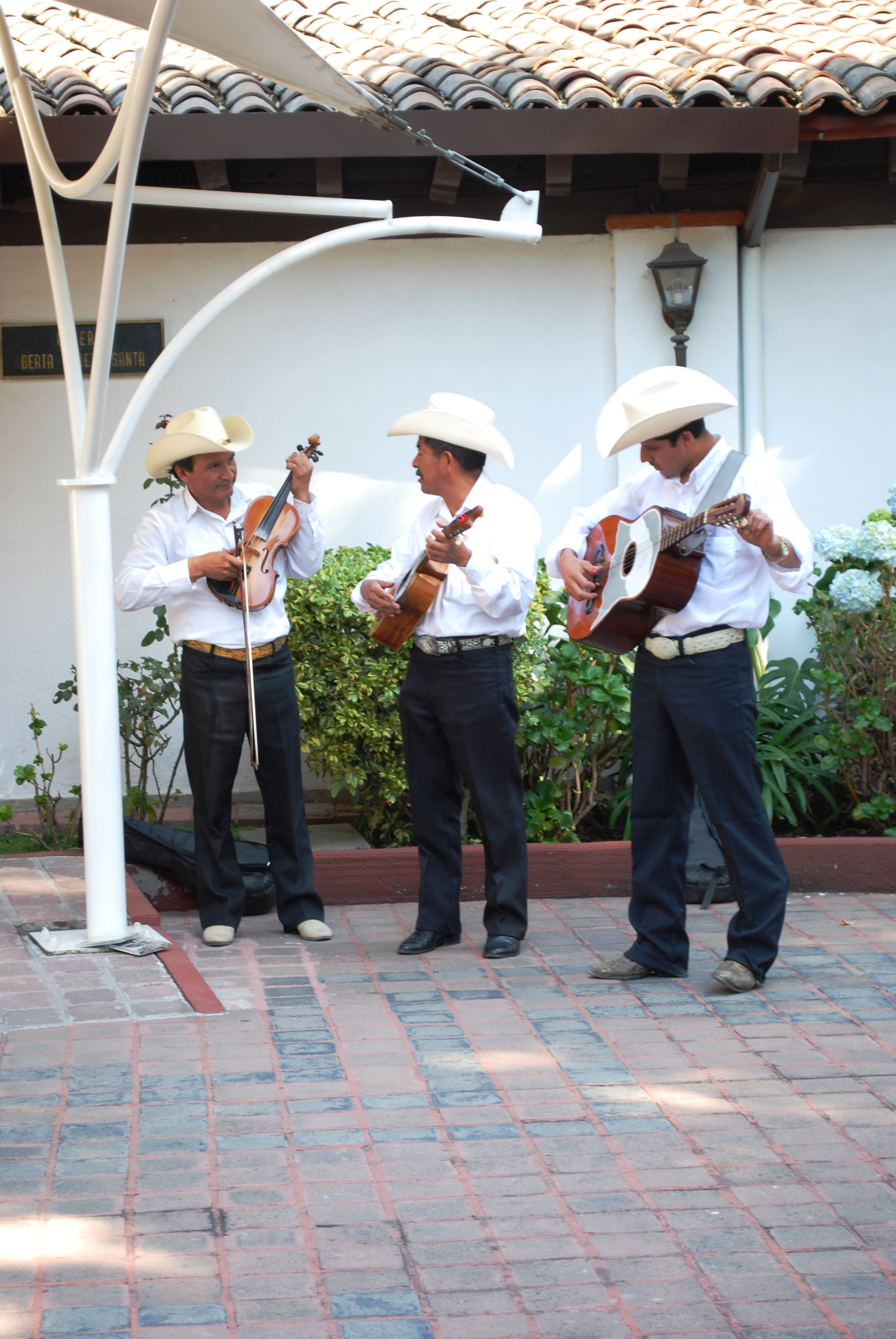
Huapango trio from Veracruz at the Alfredo Guati Rojo National Watercolor Museum.

Despite the lack of ethnic Huastecs, the region still maintains a cultural identity, which is celebrated at various festivals such as the Encuentro de las Huastecas (Huastec Encounter) in Amatlán in November, and the Festival de la Huasteca in Ahuacatlán de Guadalupe, Purísimas de Arista and Agua Zarca in Querétaro. Much of the region's culture has remained distinct because of the lack of communication with the outside world. This region has not been extensively studied by academics.

The most traditional dance and music of the region is called the Huapango or Son Huasteco. It is played by a trio of musicians: one playing a small, five-string rhythm guitar called a jarana huasteca, one on an eight-string bass guitar called a quinta huapanguera and another playing a violin. The two guitarists sing coplas, or short poetry stanzas, alternating verses between them. Son huasteco has two unique trademarks: improvised violin ornamentations based on a melody, and the use of a high falsetto voice. The style has spread beyond Veracruz and San Luis Potosí to other states including Hidalgo, which is now another center for the music. Unlike other folk music in Mexico, it is not in danger of disappearing and remains in high demand for major celebrations in La Huasteca. The music has been researched and cataloged for over forty years which has resulted in a two CD compilation called El Gusto. It was also the focus of a documentary called “A Mexican Sound” by Roy Germano.

The dance is performed on an elevated platform called a zapatea. The music and dance in its several varieties is shared by all the ethnicities of the region. It is most often performed in rural social events called “fandangos.” . It is also performed at the various Huastec cultural events such as the Festival de la Huasteca in Querétaro.

Traditional dishes include mixotes, enchiladas, barbacoa and especially a corn pudding called zacahuil.

The end of wet season farming ends with Xantolo. It is similar to Day of the Dead and celebrated at the same time, but it has important differences. Xantolo brings people to cemeteries as well but it is to celebrate the living and the dead, as it marks the harvest of this growing season. Preparations for Xantolo last a week with altars remaining through November. Gifts of food are prepared to exchange with god parents, friends, family and neighbors. Altars consist of arches over a rectangular table. Each corner of the table has a pole to represent the four stages of human life (childhood, adolescence, adult and old age). The poles are bent towards the center above the table to form arches, and covered with branches of local flora. It shares certain elements with Day of the Dead such as cempasúchil flowers, papel picado and the creation of altars to the dead adorned with local fruit, candles and copal incense. The traditional is inaugurated on October 29 with the slaughter of pigs and turkeys. October 30 and 31 are for the remembrance of children and adults respectively; the final day, November 1, is meant to honor both saints and grandparents. A traditional dance for the event has groups of dancers who ridicule the powerful of the local society, who are then chained by a devil. These dancers perform with cloth masks, with the aim that Death does not recognize them and take them away.

The Volador rite is performed by the Huastecs in the east of San Luis Potosí although they wear normal clothes adorned with feathers. The exception is the captain who wears a red or blue tunic.

Carnival is important in the Veracruz part of the Huasteca, but each as a very local and religious character. For the Nahuas, Carnival is considered to be a “ritual of inversion” where social norms are relaxed. This is done to “placate the Devil” and keep him happy as well. Activities include men dressing as women and local authorities are made powerless temporarily. Offerings are also made by burial, perhaps an offering to the underworld. In many communities, many birds are slaughtered and alcohol is drunk in abundance. Carnival marks the end of dry season farming before rains begin in earnest in April. Ceremonies to ask for abundant rain begin after the end of Lent .

== Economy ==
The Huasteca is one of the poorest regions of the country, with the federal government categorizing it as a “critical region” in terms of combating poverty. The most pressing economic and political problems are in the Veracruz section with high socioeconomic marginalization due to isolation, disputes over land and political repression. Since the mid 20th century, there has been seasonal and permanent migration out of the area and into other areas of Mexico and to the United States to work. In Mexico, most go to Mexico City, Tampico and Monterrey to work as household help but they also go to work in mines in Pachuca and farms in San Luis Potosí, coffee plantations in Huauchinango and the United States.

Like most rural indigenous regions, the economy is based on agriculture, especially the growing of corn. Other important aspects include cattle, the processing of sugar cane, coffee and the growing of citrus as a cash crop although most of this is under the control of mestizos. Piloncillo from sugar cane is an important processed product, most of which is shipped to Jalisco for the tequila industry.

Handcrafts of the area include ceramics in Huejutla, ixtle items, quechquemitls, cross stitch decorated garments in the region on the Hidalgo-Veracruz border, musical instruments and furniture, especially chairs made of cedar and other tropical hardwoods. In the area around Tantoyuca, Veracruz, handcrafts from a fiber called zapupe and palm is used to make hats, carrying bags and other objects.

The main regional markets include Tantoyuca, Huejutla, Tamazunchale and Chicontepec.

Most of the region is not visited by foreign tourists as the preference is for the beaches. Ecotourism attractions include rappelling alongside waterfalls, rafting on rivers such as the Santa Maria, most of which are located in the state of San Luis Potosí. Englishman Edward James built Las Pozas (The Wells) in an area of coffee and banana plantations near Xilitla. The poet lived here from 1949 until his death in 1984. The gardens contains giant sculptures, pagodas, and staircases to nowhere over a property of 32 hectares. The poet's former home is a mansion of turrets and Gothic windows in the middle of the jungle. Today it is a hotel with the name of La Posada El Castillo.

== Transportation ==
Most cities in the Huasteca region can be reached in 1-3 hours from the Tampico_International_Airport, which has, as of June 2026, direct flights to 8 airports, including those in Dallas and Houston.

For bus transportation, most of the main bus companies serve the main cities. Between smaller towns, tourists must generally rely on shared mini-vans, called 'colectivos.' However, taxi and car rentals are also relatively affordable.

== See also ==
- Huastec civilization
- Huastec people
- Nahuas of La Huasteca

== Bibliography ==
- Lorenzo Ochoa (1990). Huaxtecos y totonacos [Huastecs and Totonacs] (in Spanish). Mexico City: CONACULTA. ISBN 968-29-2466-9.
