= Necaxa River =

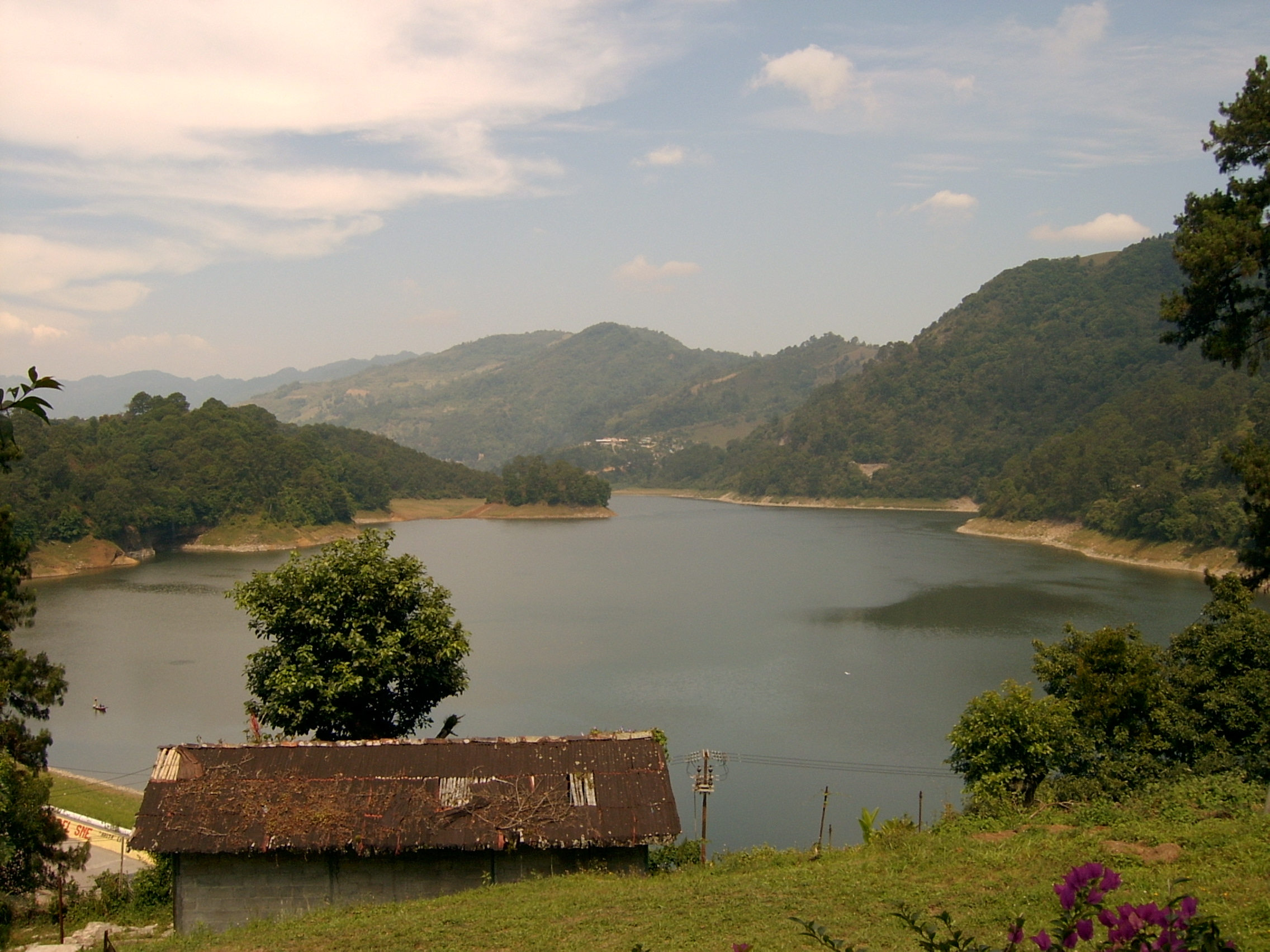
- Native name: Río Necaxa (Spanish)

Location
- country: Mexico
- states: Hidalgo, Puebla, Veracruz

Physical characteristics
- Mouth
  - location: Tecolutla River

The Necaxa River (Río Necaxa) is one of the main rivers of the Mexican state of Puebla. It is a tributary of the Tecolutla River. Beginning south of Huauchinango with the name Totolapa, it runs through tall mountains and deep canyons of the Sierra Madre Oriental, forming the waterfalls known as Salto Chico y Salto Grande. Its flow is also used to generate hydroelectric power.

== Geography ==
The Necaxa River rises along the boundary of Hidalgo and Puebla states, and flows eastwards through the Sierra Madre Oriental of Puebla and Veracruz. It joins the Apulco River in Espinal, Veracruz to form the Tecolutla River, which empties into the Gulf of Mexico.

Together with four other rivers, the El Tejocotal, Los Reyes, Patla, and Tenango, the Necaxa produces a total of 172 million litres of water generating electrical power not only for Puebla, but for the states of Tlaxcala, Hidalgo, Mexico, and the Federal District, in addition to many people in the center of the country.

Five dams were built in the Necaxa River basin for water storage and producing hydroelectricity.

Small-scale forestry takes place in the watershed.

== Flora and fauna ==
The river basin's reservoirs are habitat for waterfowl, including the great egret (Ardea alba), snowy egret (Egretta thula), little blue heron (Egretta caerulea), neotropic cormorant (Phalacrocorax olivaceus), ringed kingfisher (Megaceryle torquata), and green kingfisher (Chloroceryle americana). Endangered species found in the river and its basin include the Puebla frog (Lithobates pueblae) and the tree fern Cyathea mexicana.

== Zona Protectora Forestal Vedada Cuenca Hidrográfica del Río Necaxa ==
Zona Protectora Forestal Vedada Cuenca Hidrográfica del Río Necaxa
- IUCN category VI (protected area with sustainable use of natural resources)
- Location within Mexico
- Location: Hidalgo and Puebla, Mexico
- Coordinates: 20°09′N 98°03′W
- Area: 421.29 km^{2} (162.66 sq mi)
- Designation: Natural resources protection area
- Designated: 2002
- Administrator: National Commission of Natural Protected Areas

Ramsar Wetland
- Official name: Sistema de Represas y Corredores biológicos de la Cuenca Hidrográfica del Río Necaxa
- Designated: 2 February 2008
- Reference no.: 1796

On 20 October 1938, President Lázaro Cárdenas decreed the Necaxa River basin in Hidalgo and Puebla a protected forest zone (zona protectora forestal) in order to preserve the basin's forests and climate, prevent soil erosion, and stabilize the rivers' flow for production of hydroelectricity. The protected forest zone covers an area of 421.29 km^{2} in the municipalities of Acaxochitlán, Cuautepec de Hinojosa, Naupan, Huauchinango, Juan Galindo, Xochiltepec, Zihuateutla, Tlaola, Chiconcuautla, Jolalpan, Zacatlán, and Ahuazotepec.

On 9 September 2002 the Mexican government re-designated the basin a natural resources protection area.

The five reservoirs in the basin were designated a Ramsar site (wetland of international importance) on 2 February 2008. The Ramsar site covers a total of 1,541.4 ha.

== Navigability ==
This river is adapted for navigation as the generating plant opens its floodgates to the full flow of the river to permit boats to pass against the current.

The Necaxa is a Class III River.

== Access ==
From Mexico City, take the Mexico-Tuxpan road and drive to Tulancingo. Then drive to Huauchinango with final destination to "El Salto" (the location of a CFE's hydroelectric plant).
