= Pahuatlán =

- Town and Municipality
- Pahuatlán del Valle
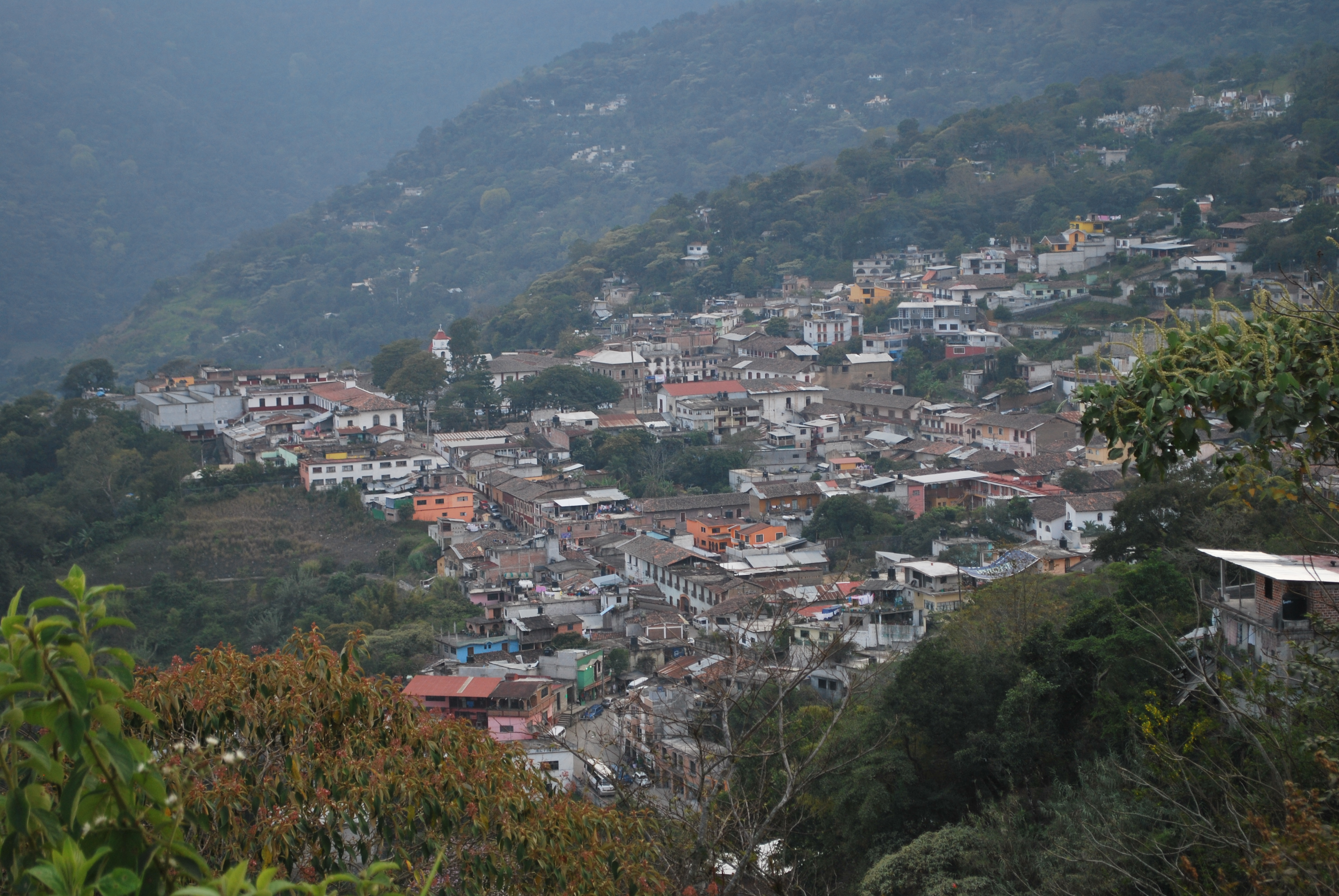
- Panoramic of the town of Pahuatlán
- Interactive map of Pahuatlán
- Coordinates: 20°16′32″N 98°09′01″W
- Country: Mexico
- State: Puebla
- Founded: 1532
- Municipal Status: 19th century

Government
  - Municipal President: Melitón Guzmán Vallejo
- Elevation (of seat): 1,600 m (5,200 ft)

Population (2010) Municipality
  - Municipality: 20,619
- Time zone: UTC-6 (Zona Centro)
- Postal code (of seat): 73100
- Demonym: Pahuatense

Pahuatlán (Spanish: [pawaˈtlan]), officially Pahuatlán del Valle, is a town and municipality located in the northwest of the state of Puebla in central Mexico. The municipality is part of the Sierra Norte region of the state, a steep mountainous area which receive significant moisture from the Gulf of Mexico, and borders the states of Hidalgo and Veracruz.

The town was founded by the Augustinians when they built a small monastery in the town in 1532, with the area divided among ethnic Nahuas and Otomis, both of which can still be found here today. Culturally, the municipality is best known for the amate bark paper which is produced by the Otomis of the San Pablito community.

== The town ==
The town of Pahuatlán is located on a small level space on the side of the Ahila Mountain about 1600 meters above sea level in the Sierra Norte mountains of Puebla about fifty km from Tulancingo near the Hidalgo and Veracruz state borders. It is the center of commerce for the municipality of the same name, with a population of just over 3,000. The area conserves most of its traditional simple and austere architecture despite the lack of ordinances to that effect. The center of the town has stone paved roads. Traditional houses consist of two floors with wrought iron balconies and high roofs covered in red tile. The town has been photographed by noted artist Angeles Torrejon for a series called "Vivir en la Sierra" (To live in the mountains). Another regular photographer of the area is Ruben Pax.

The historic center of the town is its main plaza, which serves as a tianguis market on Sundays, selling handcrafts such as rebozos, other textiles, fresh flowers, ceramics, leather goods and more, mostly from the surrounding rural communities.

This plaza is surrounded by the main civic and religious structures of the area, such as the municipal palace. The main monumental structure in the municipality is the Santiago Apóstol parish from the 16th century. The patron saint of the municipality is the Apostle James the Great, whose feast day is celebrated on 25 June here with masses, processions, fireworks and traditional dance including the Voladores.

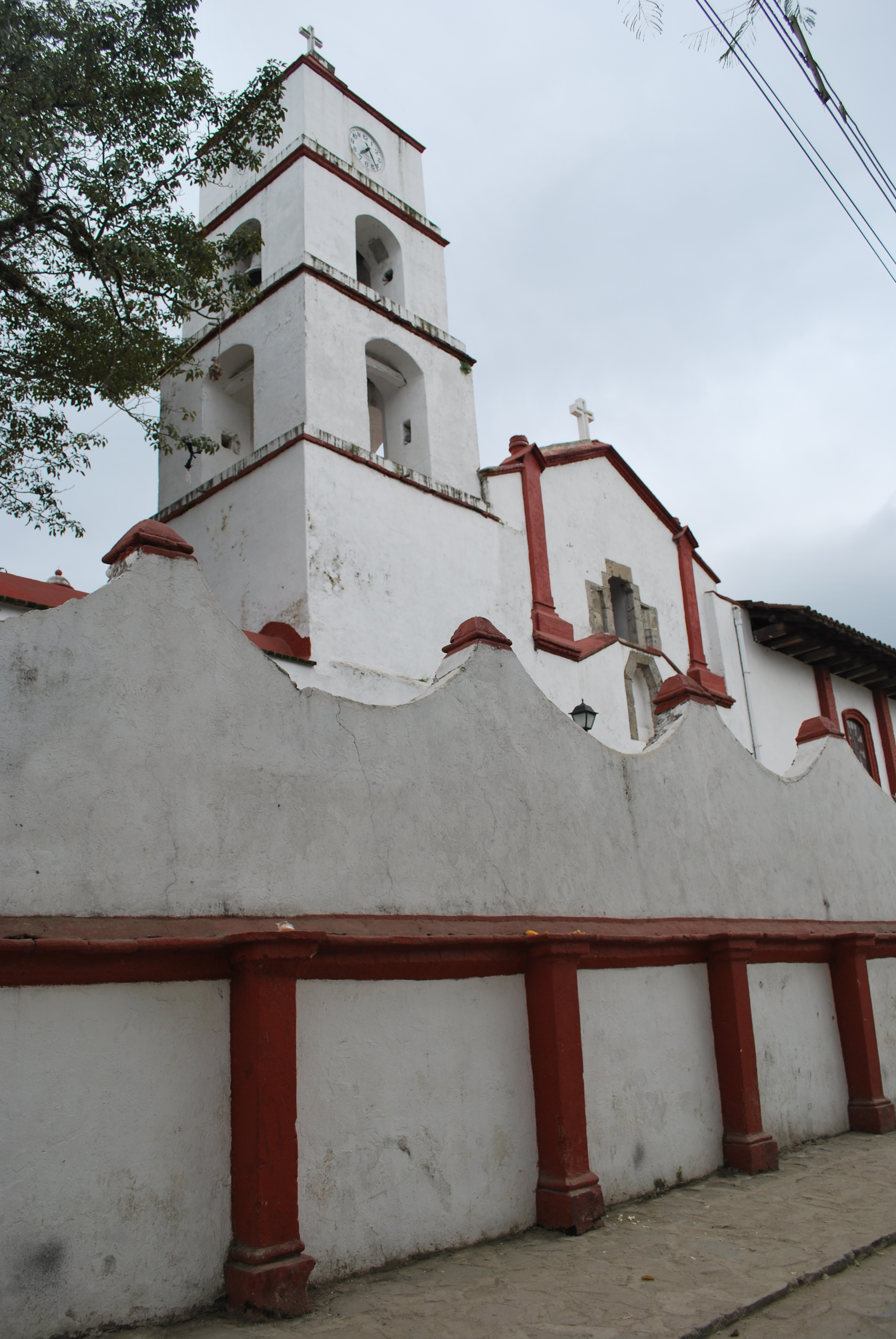
View of the parish church

The Casa de Cultura has paintings and literature related to the municipality.

The main handcrafts store is the Casa del Amate (House of Amate Paper) located on the main road heading towards the town center. In addition to selling the local paper, it also sells embroidered items and paintings. It was the workshop of painter Rafael Lechuga, whose art depicts the area and the local amate paper.

The Parque de los Muertos, according to tradition, is where soldiers loyal to Maximilian I were buried.

The most traditional music of the area is huapango. Traditional dress for women includes a long black skirt with a white embroidered blouse and rebozo or quezquémetl. For men, it includes undyed cotton pants and shirt, a palm leaf hat, sandals and a machete. Traditional dishes of the area include mole poblano, pipián, tamales, fresh water shrimp and a type of ant called chicales. At night, a traditional snack is "molletes," French bread with refried beans, longaniza sausage and cheese which is toasted. Pahuatlán is one of a number of communities that claims to be the origin of the Danza de los Voladores. It hosted the fourth Danza de los Voladores ( International Encounter in 1998. The spectacle is mostly performed by the Nahuas in the area.

It is a weekend getaway for residents of Tulancingo. There are two main hotels, one with three stars and the other with one. There are also a number of small guesthouses operated by families in their homes. Locally produced coffee is available in the town's stores.

Carnival lasts for the eight days prior to Ash Wednesday to mark the end of "mundane life" in preparation for Lent and Holy Week. Participants are men dressed in multicolored outfits and wood masks who dance in the streets accompanied by live or recorded music. These are known as the "Huehues of Pahuatlán." The municipality supports the annual event in several ways including workshops for the making and improving of costumes and masks.

Pahuatlán major festival is during Holy Week, which attracted an estimated 8,000 people in 2008. Religious events are complemented by the annual Festival Cultural de la Sierra which sponsors plays art exhibits and more.

Another important celebration marks the victory of General Lechuga's forces of the French, celebrated in January.

The town held its first film festival called the Encuentro Nacional de Festivales de Cine in 2012, sponsored by the Centro Internacional de Artes y Ciencias (Cinearte) and the Festival Internacional de Cine de Puebla (FICP).

== The municipality ==
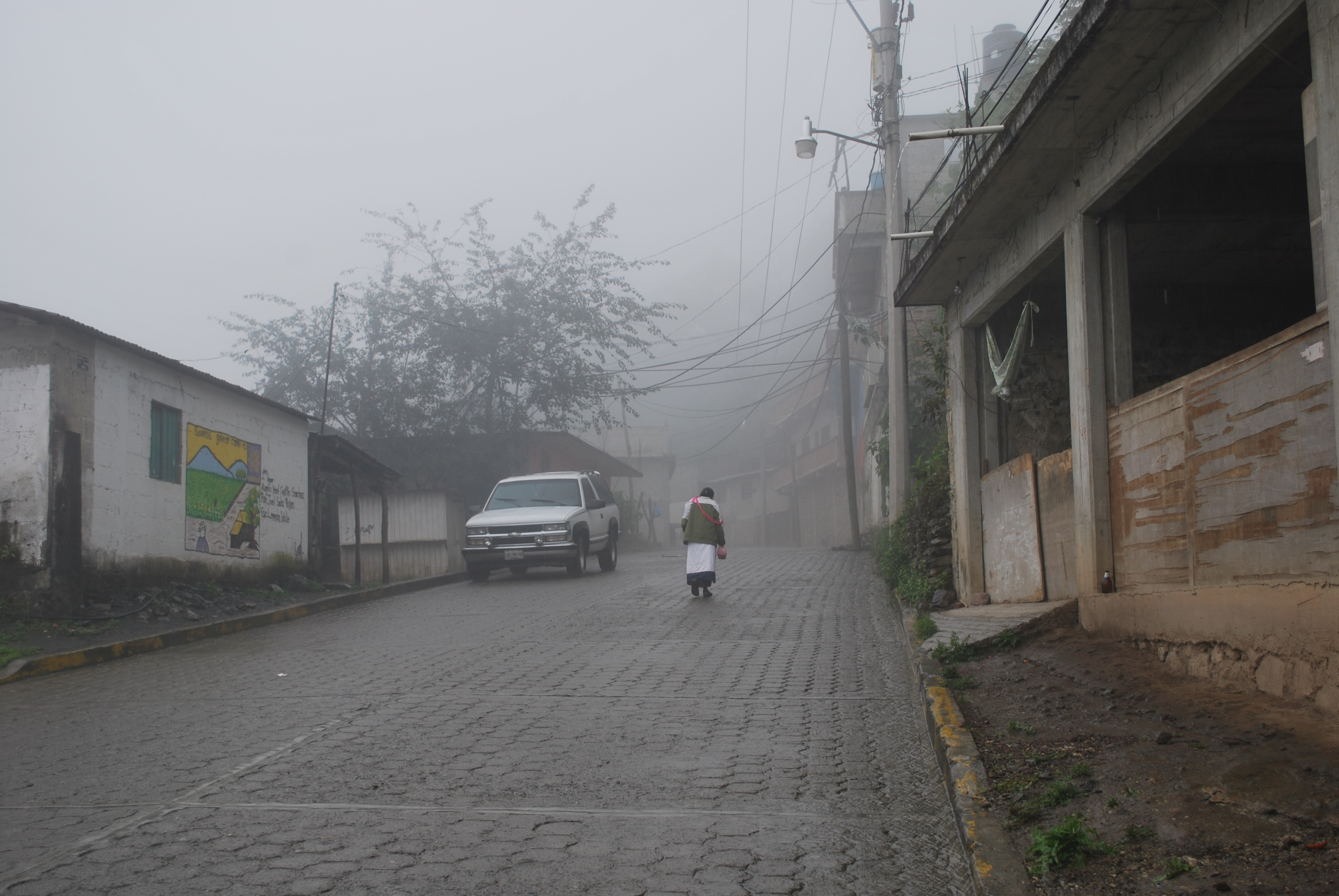
View of the main street in San Pablito

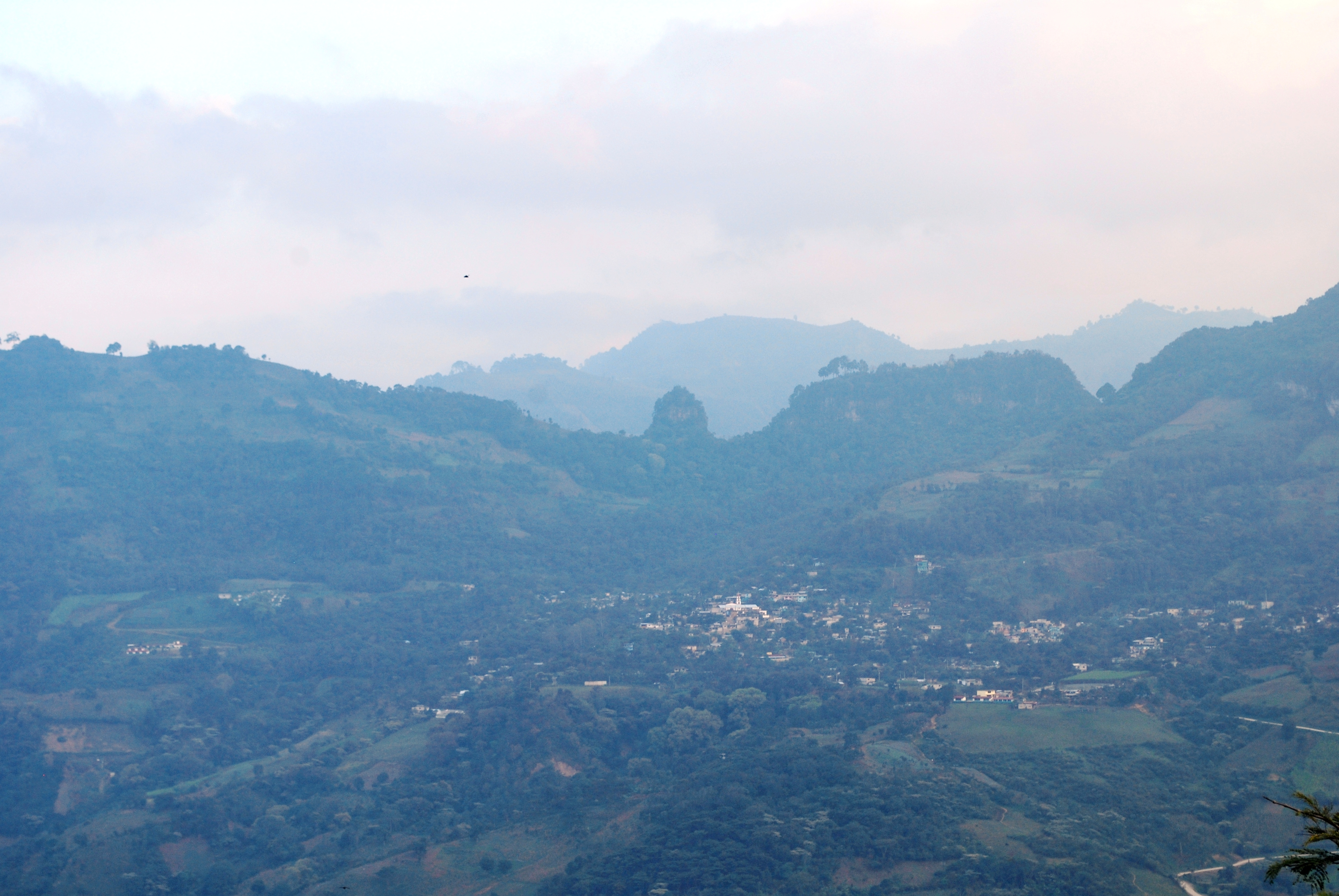
View of the Pahuatlán Valley

The town of Pahuatlán is the seat of government for the municipality of the same name, which contains a population of 20,619 as of 2010, divided into thirty four communities. Together, the communities form an area of 80.37 km^{2} (31.03 sq mi), nestled in the far northwest of the state of Puebla, bordering the Sierra Otomí-Tepahua mountains of Hidalgo. The municipality borders the municipalities of Tlacuilotepec, Naupan and Honey, bordering the state of Hidalgo on the north, south and west. All of the communities of the municipality are classified as rural, with the exception of the seat and San Pablito. The municipal government consists of a municipal president, an officer called a "síndico" and seven representatives called "regidores."

The municipality is in the south of a cultural region known as La Huasteca. Just under half of the population is indigenous, divided between ethnic Nahua and ethnic Otomí.

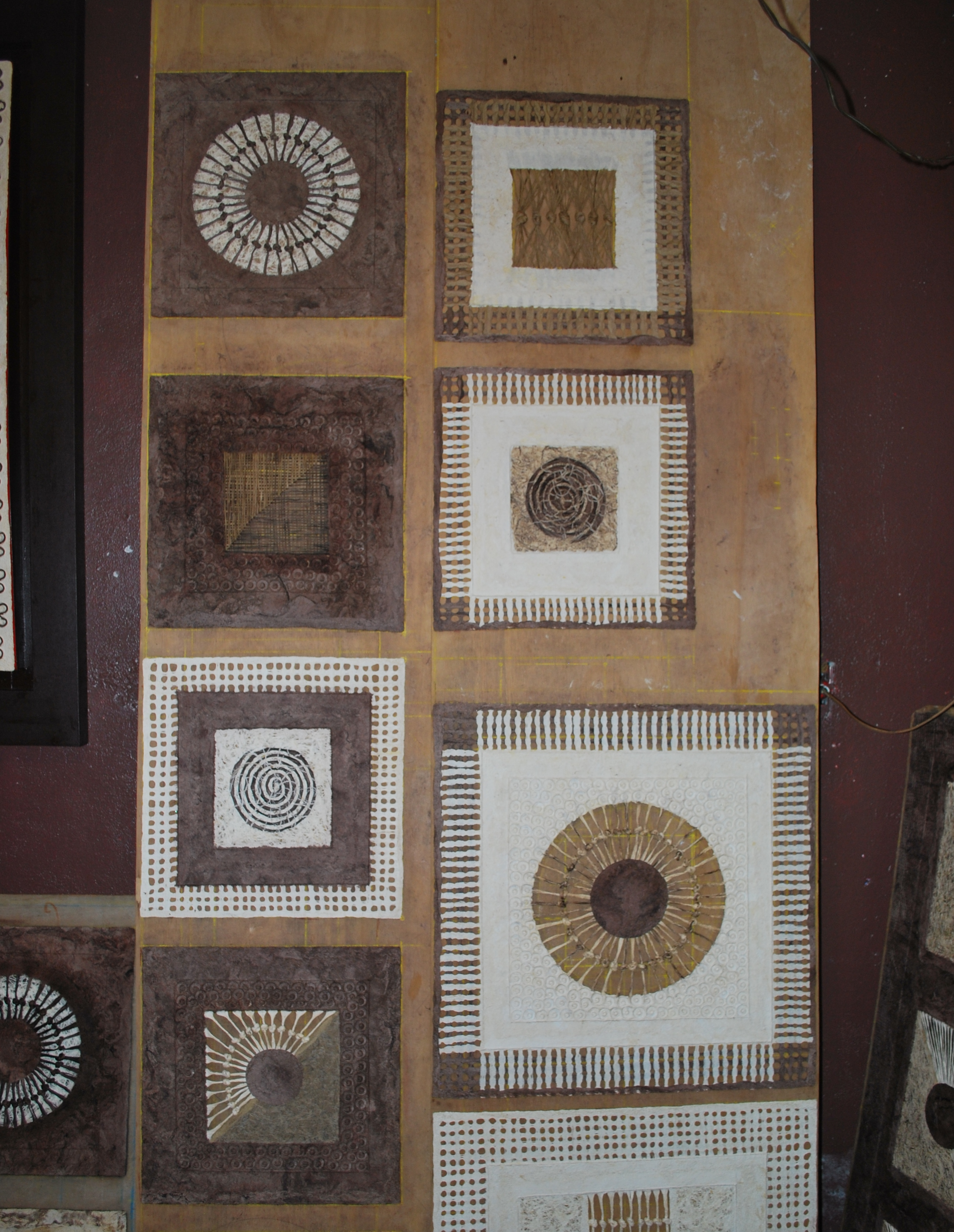
Amate paper wall hangings at the Gallery/Museum in San Pablito

After the town of Pahuatlán, the most populous community is San Pablito, with 2,760 people on a level area on the side of the Cerro del Guajalote Mountain near the Cerro del Brujo. Its Otomi name is Bite (meaning "below the mountain"). It is separated from the municipal seat by twelve km, and a deep ravine cut by the San Marcos River. The main economic activity here is handcrafts, especially the production of a paper called "amate" made from the bark of a kind of fig tree that grows in the area. The creation of this paper dates back to the pre Hispanic period and was and is used by the shamans of the area in rituals. The small town is the principal producer of amate paper in Mexico. The paper is mostly made by women in their homes and is sold to artists and artisans all over the world. Most is bought by Nahua painters from the state of Guerrero. On days when the paper is being manufactured, it is possible to hear the rhythmic thumping of stones pounding the fibers through the town. The production of the paper has caused environmental problems such as the overstripping of trees for bark and the use of chemicals which wind up in the Cazones River. The problematic chemicals are caustic soda, used to soften the bark and industrial dyes.

The Fiesta del Pueblo or Town Festival occurs annually in San Pablito. It begins the week after Holy Week ends and lasts for fifteen days. Twelve saints are honored during this time, with each having his or her own day. The most important of these days is that dedicated to the Holy Trinity with the day honoring the towns patron saint, Saint Paul, coming second. San Pablito also is known for its colorful celebrations of Day of the Dead. This lasts from 31 October to 2 November, with different days dedicated to children, adults and saints.

Cuauneutla is one of the oldest communities in the municipality. It is located thirteen km from the municipal seat with a population of just over 700. Its main economic activity is the production of coffee. In February, the community of Cuauneutla celebrates its patron, the Señor de la Agonía (Lord of Agony) with cultural, religious, sporting and social events.

Xolotla is located about 14 km from the municipal seat with a population of about 2,400 people. Its main economic activity is embroidery and other handcrafts. Atla is located about ten km from the municipal seat with a population of about 1,700 people. Its main economic activity is agriculture, especially the growing of coffee along with some handcrafts. Tlalcruz de Libres is located about 12 km from the municipal seat with a population of just over 1,000 people. Its main economic activity is agriculture, especially the growing of coffee. Zoyatla de Guerrero is located about twelve km from the municipal seat with a population of under 1000. Its main economic activity is the growing of coffee. Atlantongo is located about 18 km from the municipal seat with a population of about 680. Its main economic activity is the growing of chili peppers along with crafts.

Pahuatlán's main hospital is located down in the valley area near the river. It was opened in 2000, replacing a clinic built in 1970. It has a capacity of twelve beds and an emergency room. Flooding and shifting earth has damaged the structures with noticeable cracks in its walls. Much of the damage occurred in 2006 and 2007 as a result of Hurricanes Dean and Karl.

== History ==
The name comes from Nahuatl and means “place of avocados” or “place of fruit.” Its Otomi name is “Matsooni,” which is derived from the word for avocado.

During the pre Hispanic era, the area was inhabited by various ethnicities including the Nahuas, Otomis and Totonacas. The Aztec Empire invaded the area and nominally held it until the Spanish arrived, but the rich resources of the area were in dispute between the local Otomi and Nahua peoples. The Spanish took over the area in 1522 and imposed the encomienda system. The first evangelists to the area were the Augustinians. They founded a small monastery in 1532, where the parish church, built in 1652, is found now. This is considered to be the founding of the town of Pahuatlán. The area come under the direct rule of the Spanish Crown in the 17th century. By 1750, it came under the jurisdiction of Huauchinango and remained so until 1860.

The major historical event to happen in this area occurred during the French Intervention in Mexico. On 28 January 1865, a battle occurred here between the French and their backers against troops under Coronel José Luis Lechuga.

In 1861, the municipality's official name was changed to Pahuatlán del Valle to honor General Don Leandro Valle.

As the town of Pahuatlán is located on the side of a steep hill, it is prone to landslides and other consequences of erosion. In October 2007, a fault line 800 meters long opened on one side of the town, causing the evacuations of over eighty families. This negatively affected tourism in the area for a time.

The municipal seat has applied to become a Pueblo Mágico in order to attract tourism to the area. To be accepted the state government invested 50 million pesos in social infrastructure. This included the reconstruction and widening of the Atlantongo-Xolotla highway, which cost over 20 million pesos.

== Geography ==
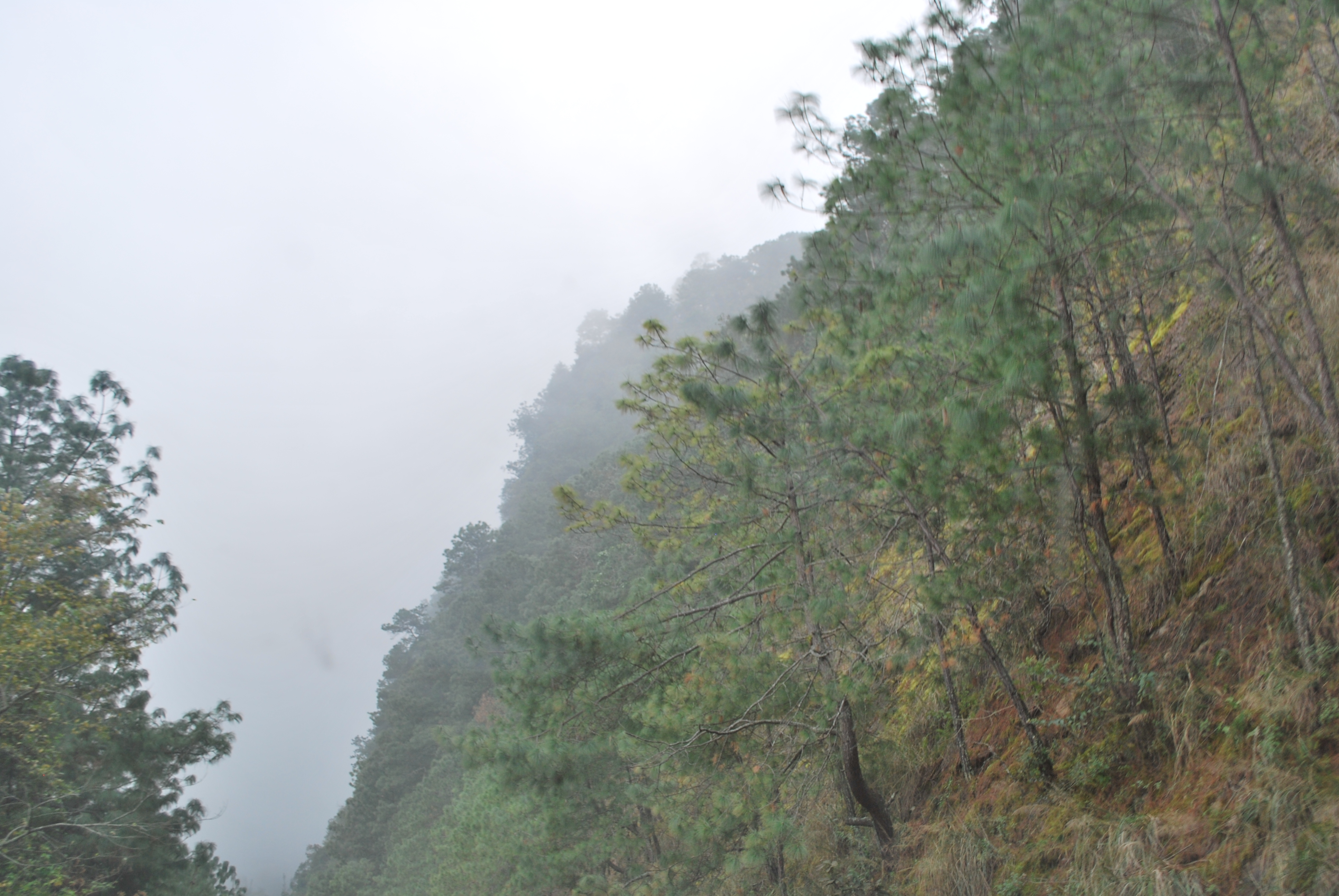
Steep mountainsides of the Sierra Norte of Puebla around Pahuatlán

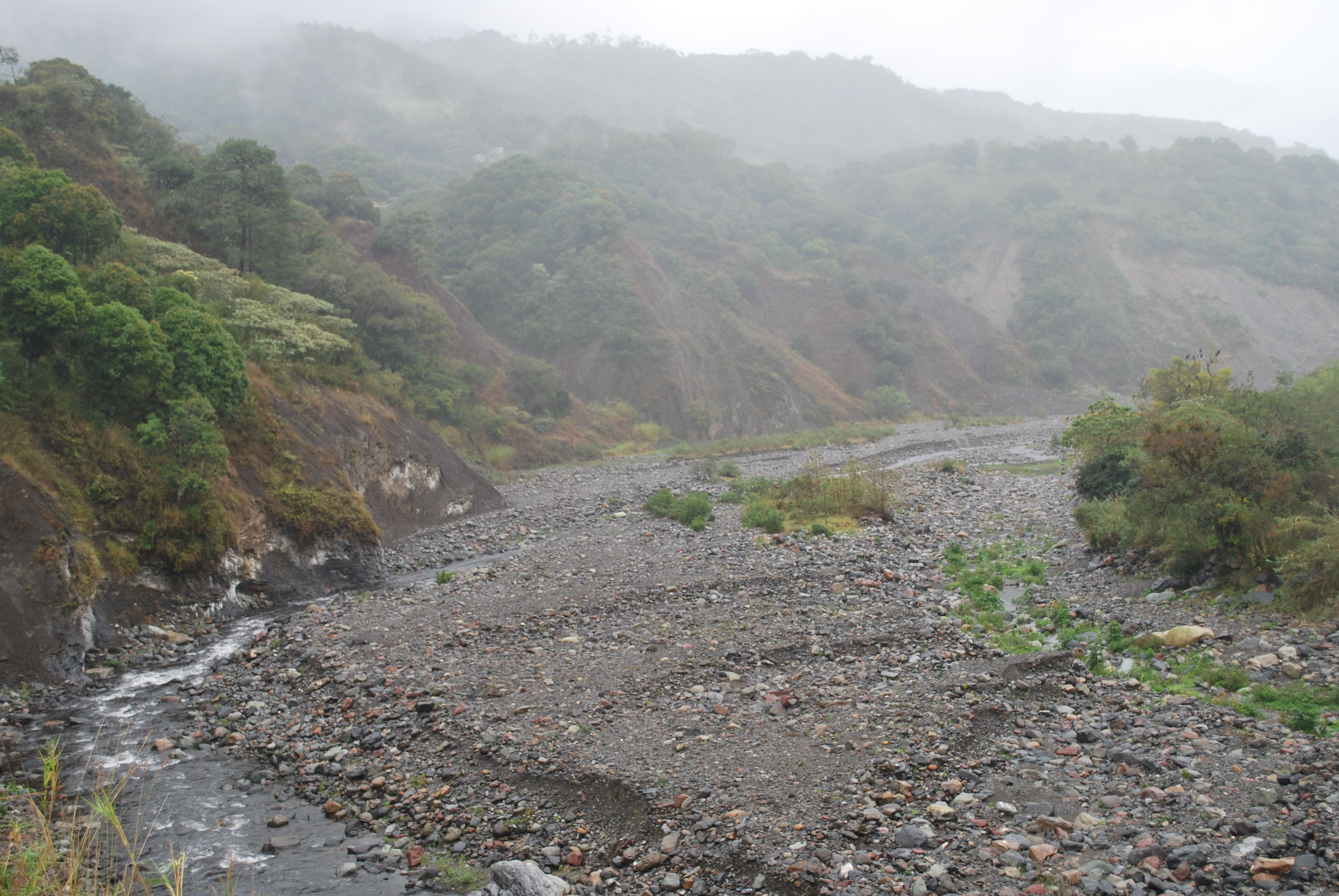
View of the San Marcos River

=== Mountains ===
Pahuatlán is in the northwestern Sierra Norte of Puebla mountain range, at the intersection of the Trans-Mexican Volcanic Belt and the Sierra Madre Oriental, between the Mexican Plateau and the Gulf of Mexico coast. This area consists of a series of many individual mountain peaks formed in parallel lines. These mountains are separated by narrow valleys which frequently slope down towards the Gulf of Mexico. The terrain is steep and irregular with much of the municipality following the San Marcos and Mamiquetla rivers. Major peaks include the El Chile, Toxtla, Blanco, Tlazalotepec, De la Cruz, and Batalla de 28 Enero. The elevation of the municipality varies from 600–2,000 metres (2,000–6,600 ft) above sea level.

=== Climate ===
There are two main climates in the municipalities, the temperate of the higher Sierra Norte and the hotter climate of the lower elevations nearer to the Gulf of Mexico The temperate climate has average annual temperatures which range from 12 to 18C. Most of the municipality falls under this designation. A small portion is in a semi hot climate with an average annual temperature of over 18C.

Both climates are humid, receiving large quantities of moist air from the Gulf, with the municipalities one of the most moist areas in the Sierra Norte of Puebla. The steep terrain and wet weather of the area makes its prone to landslides and the opening of cracks in the ground. In 1999, a twenty-meter fissure opened after a period of rain. In 2007, a fault line opened in the ground for 800 meters from the municipal palace to Leandro Valle Schools, provoking several landslides and mandatory evacuations of over eighty families. About four tons of earth and debris moved as a result.

=== Natural history ===
The area is part of several river basins which are all tributaries of the Gulf of Mexico. The rivers here are relatively recent in formation, winding with a number of steep drops. The two largest river basins are those of the Cazones and Tuxpan rivers with the principle water flows being the Mamiquetla, the Cuarco, Los Marías, Trinidad, Honey, Alcalman, Pahuatitla and Chixtla. Several of these eventually form the San Marcos, the main tributary of the Cazones.

Most of the municipality's natural vegetation ecosystems have been eliminated. Some forests at the highest elevations remain, of the Sierra Madre Oriental pine-oak forests ecoregion. The lower elevations generally have only shrubs and other low growing vegetation. One major forest area is the perennial rainforest on the edges of the San Marcos River. Where natural vegetation still exists, wildlife such as deer, rabbits and opossum along with various bird and reptiles species are found.

There are caves at Angeles Tlacuilotepec, El Saltillo and Cazones, with cave paintings in the area between the Atla and Xolotla communities as well as a small archeological site at Saltillo.

== Socioeconomics ==
Most of the municipality's residents lives in a state of socioeconomic marginalization, with thirty one communities classified as highly marginalized and two as very highly marginalized. The main economic activities are farming, especially coffee and the making of handcrafts, with commerce concentrated in the town of Pahuatlán proper.

The municipality is Mexico's main producer of amate bark paper, with its production concentrated in the community of San Pablito. Other handcrafts include hats, necklaces, embroidered clothing, baskets, semi precious stones and the weaving of wool. The Museo de Arte Popular has sponsored a different craft for the area, the creation of beaded bands. The production and sale of these bands is not only to help support the artisan community of Pahuatlan but also to earn money for other museum projects.

However, despite this, most of the area's youth migrate to the United States for employment. This has left the area with mostly women. The economic recession of 2009 in the United States had a significant negative impact in the area with remittances sent back cut.

Although the area is not well known to tourists, efforts have been made to bring tourism to the municipality, principally through efforts to get the town of Pahuatlán designated as a “Pueblo Mágico.”
