= Pantepec =

Pantepec may refer to:

- Pantepec, Chiapas
- Pantepec, Puebla
- Pantepec River
- Pantepec Municipality, Chiapas
- Pantepec Municipality, Puebla
