= Fidel René Meza Cabrera =

Mexican politician

- Born: 12 November 1943 (age 82); Huauchinango, Puebla, Mexico
- Occupation: Politician
- Political party: PRI (1971–2006); PRD (2006); PAN (2007–present)

Fidel René Meza Cabrera (born 12 November 1943) is a Mexican politician affiliated with the National Action Party (PAN) who was formerly affiliated with both the Institutional Revolutionary Party (PRI) and the Party of the Democratic Revolution (PRD).

In the 2003 mid-terms he was elected to the Chamber of Deputies to represent Puebla's 1st district for the PRI, but he declared himself an independent on 26 June 2006.
