= Alberto Amador Leal =

Mexican politician (1951–2020)

- Born: 29 October 1951; Huauchinango, Puebla, Mexico
- Died: 27 December 2020 (aged 69)
- Occupation: Politician
- Political party: PRI

Narciso Alberto Amador Leal (29 October 1951 – 27 December 2020) was a Mexican politician affiliated with the Institutional Revolutionary Party (PRI).

He was elected to the Chamber of Deputies on three occasions: for Puebla's 10th district in the 1988 general election, and for Puebla's 1st district in the 2000 general election and the 2006 general election.

Amador Leal died from COVID-19 on 27 December 2020.
