= Tlapacoya =

Tlapacoya may refer to:

- Tlapacoya Municipality, a municipality in the state of Puebla, Mexico
- Tlapacoya, Calpan in Calpan Municipality, Puebla
- Tlapacoya (Mesoamerican site), an archaeological site in the Valley of Mexico
