= Puebla frog =

Conservation status
- Critically endangered, possibly extinct (IUCN 3.1)

Scientific classification
- Kingdom: Animalia
- Phylum: Chordata
- Class: Amphibia
- Order: Anura
- Family: Ranidae
- Genus: Lithobates
- Species: L. pueblae

Binomial name
- Lithobates pueblae (Zweifel, 1955)

Synonyms
- Rana pueblae Zweifel, 1955

Species of amphibian

The Puebla frog or Pueblan pool frog (Lithobates pueblae) is a species of frog in the family Ranidae endemic to Necaxa River near Huauchinango, Puebla state, Mexico, where it is known as rana poblana. It was thought to probably be extinct until 2010 when Dr. Georg Hantke from the National Museum of Scotland re-discovered it.

Natural habitats of the Puebla frog are pine and pine-oak forests near permanent river systems, its breeding habitat. It is threatened by loss of its river habitat, damming of Necaxa River being an important contributor.
