= Jalpan =

Jalpan may refer to one of two municipalities in Mexico:

- Jalpan, Puebla
- Jalpan de Serra, Querétaro
