= Ricardo Urzúa Rivera =

Mexican politician

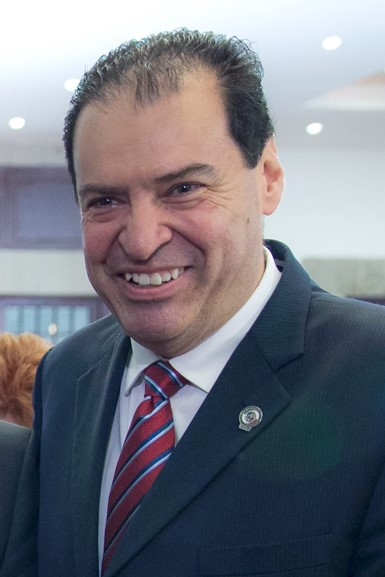
- 2020
- Born: 19 May 1966 (age 60); Mexico City, Mexico
- Occupation: Politician
- Political party: PRI

Ricardo Urzúa Rivera (born 19 May 1966) is a Mexican politician from the Institutional Revolutionary Party (PRI). Since 4 September 2014 he served as Senator during the 62nd Congress. He previously served in the Chamber of Deputies during the 61st Congress representing Puebla's 1st district.
