= Miguel Acundo González =

Mexican politician (1961–2020)

Miguel Acundo González (Puebla, 29 September 1961 – 15 September 2020) was a Mexican politician who was a member of the Chamber of Deputies for Puebla's 1st district as a member of the Social Encounter Party from 2018 till his death in office in 2020.

== Biography ==
Miguel Acundo graduated in Local Development and Municipal Government, and in Design of Social Enterprises. He dedicated himself to commercial activity and worked as purchasing manager in a company in the graphic industry.

He held various positions in public institutions such as the Secretariat for Social Development, the Secretariat for Agriculture and Rural Development, the Secretariat of Agrarian, Territorial and Urban Development, as well as in the National Institute of Social Economy and in the Secretariat of Rural Development, Sustainability and Territorial Planning of Puebla.

He was also the legal representative of the Comite de Lucha Indígena Campesina, A.C.; In 2018 he was nominated and elected federal deputy for the Juntos Haremos Historia coalition for Puebla's 1st district, joining the parliamentary group of the Social Encounter Party for the 64th Congress. In the Chamber of Deputies he was secretary of the Housing Commission and member of the Rural, Agricultural and Food Self-Sufficiency Development and Conservation commissions; and of the Indigenous Peoples commission.

On 22 August 2020, during the COVID-19 pandemic in Mexico, his party announced that he had been hospitalized after testing positive for COVID-19. He remained hospitalized until it was announced that he had died as a result of this illness on September 15, aged 58.
