= Ardelio Vargas =

Mexican politician

- Born: 14 January 1955 (age 71); Puebla, Mexico
- Occupation: Politician
- Political party: PRI

Ardelio Vargas Fosado (born 14 January 1955) is a Mexican politician from the Institutional Revolutionary Party (PRI). From 2009 to 2011 he served in the Chamber of Deputies for Puebla's 1st district.
