= Laura Guadalupe Vargas Vargas =

Mexican politician

- Born: 10 December 1987 (age 38); Puebla, Mexico
- Occupation: Politician
- Political party: PRI

Laura Guadalupe Vargas Vargas (born 10 December 1987) is a Mexican politician affiliated with the Institutional Revolutionary Party (PRI). In the 2012 general election she was elected to the Chamber of Deputies to represent Puebla's 1st district during the 62nd session of Congress.
