= Jopala =

Coordinates: 20°10′N 97°42′W

- Municipality
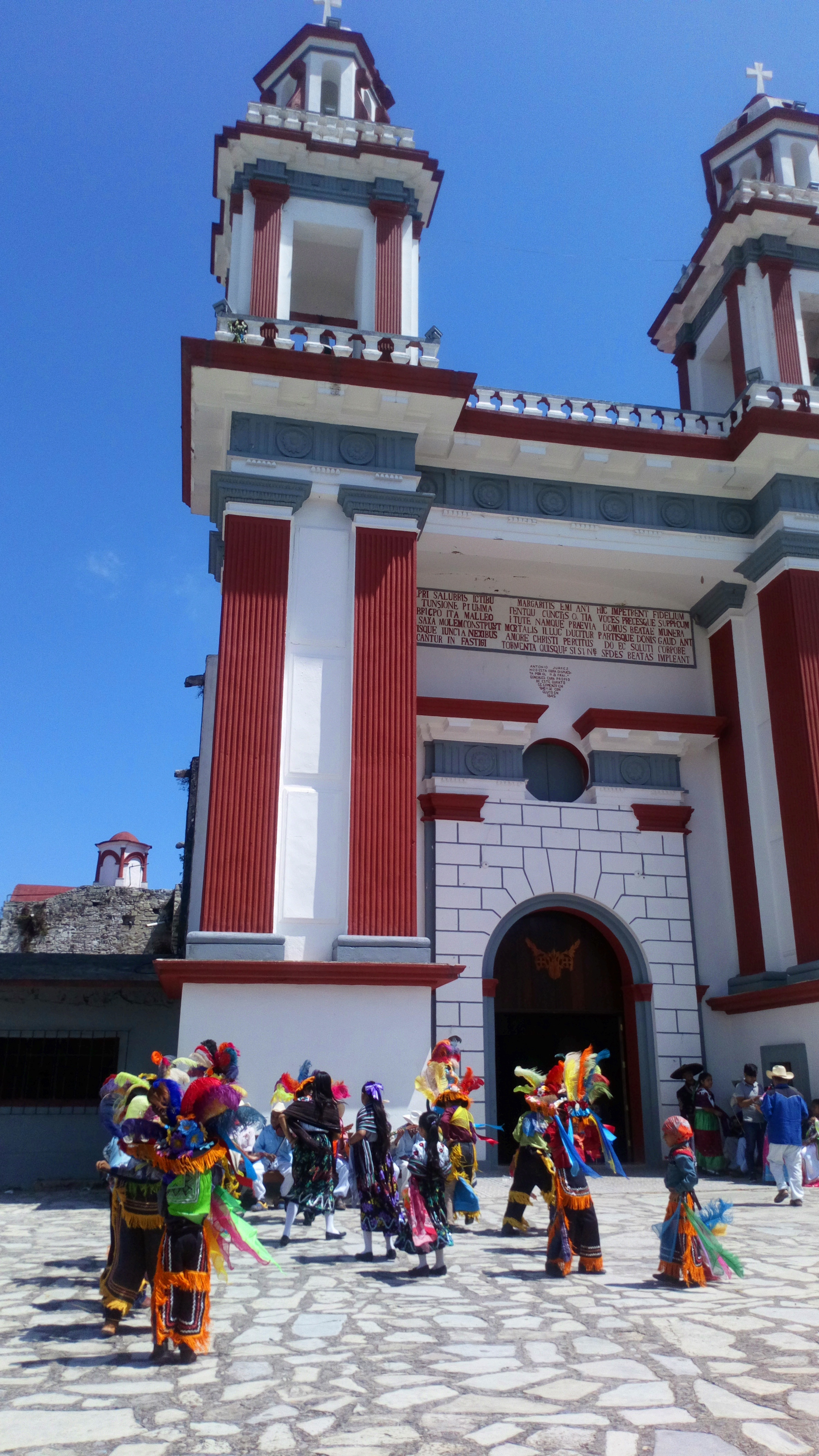
- JOPALA 2019
- Interactive map of Jopala
- Country: Mexico
- State: Puebla
- Time zone: UTC-6 (Zona Centro)

Jopala is a municipality in the Mexican state of Puebla.

The municipality covers an area of 170.3 km², and has a total population of 12,131 person.
