= Chiconcuautla =

Coordinates: 20°07′N 97°57′W

- Municipality
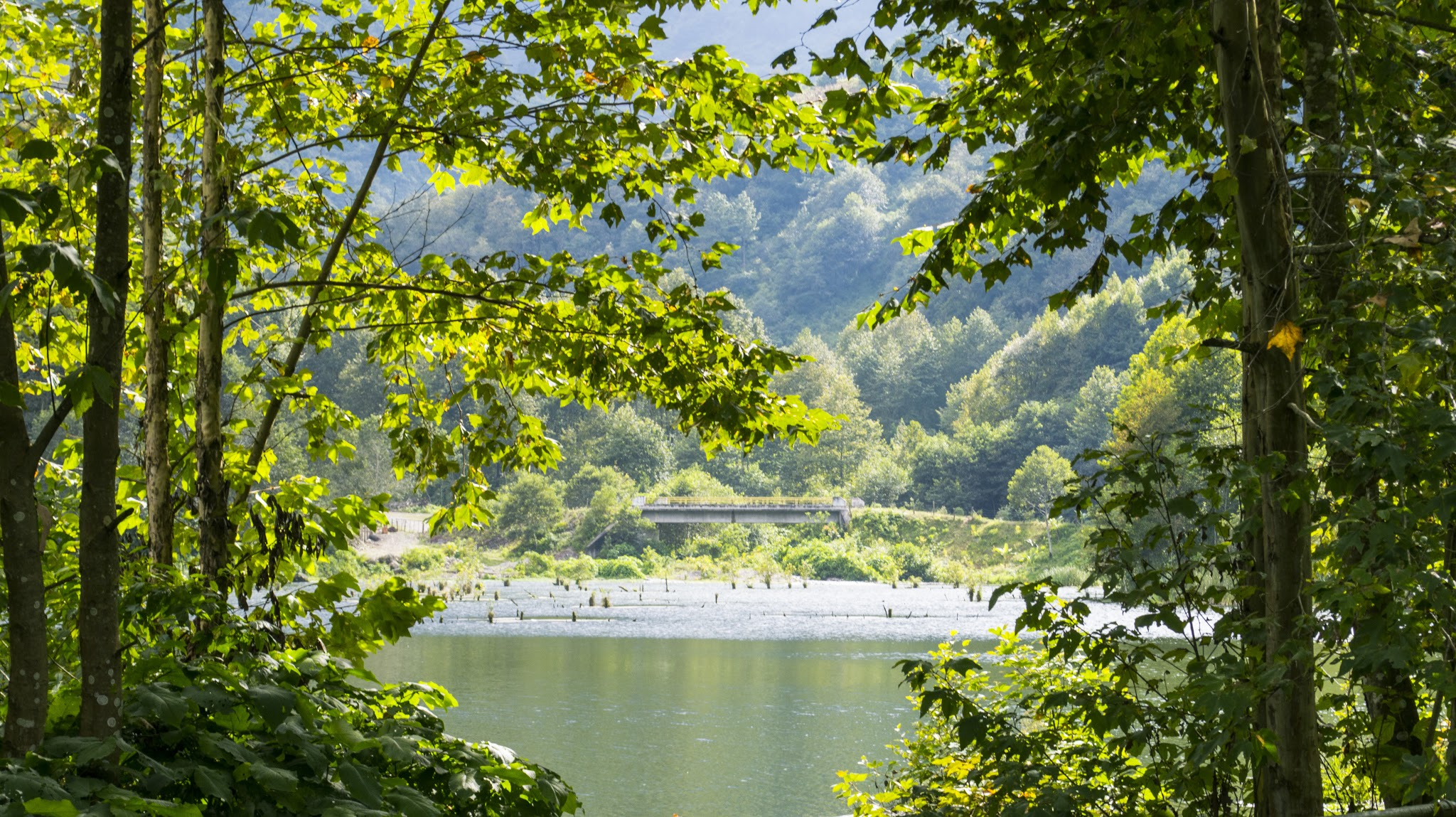

- Coat of arms
- Interactive map of Chiconcuautla
- Country: Mexico
- State: Puebla
- Time zone: UTC-6 (Zona Centro)

Chiconcuautla is a municipality in the Mexican state of Puebla.
