= Tlapacoya (municipality) =

Coordinates: 20°07′22″N 97°51′03″W

- Municipality and town
- Coat of arms
- Interactive map of Tlapacoya
- Country: Mexico
- State: Puebla
- Time zone: UTC-6 (Zona Centro)

Tlapacoya is a town and municipality in the Mexican state of Puebla.

== History ==
Tlapacoya dates back to the prehispanic era. It was conquered by Moctezuma I and incorporated into the Aztec Empire as a tributary province that also included Zacatlán. The province paid clothing, warrior costumes, and possibly labor in Tetzcoco as tribute. Cotton and honey were important resources here, and cotton markets and merchants were common. The region was ethnically mixed between Totonacs and Nahuas.
