= Venustiano Carranza Municipality, Puebla =

Coordinates: 20.5052°N 97.6689°W

Venustiano Carranza
- Municipality
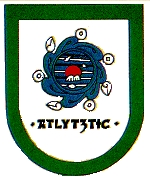
- Coat of arms
- Interactive map of Venustiano Carranza
- Country: Mexico
- State: Puebla

Population (2020)
  - Total: 28,395
- Time zone: UTC-6 (Zona Centro)

Venustiano Carranza is a municipality in the Mexican state of Puebla.

== History ==
Benigno Valencia Pérez was a commander of the municipal police in Venustiano Carranza Municipality . He was one of the eight state police kidnapped by armed men in Xicotepec, Juan Galindo (municipality), on March 30, 2019.
