= Honey, Puebla =

Honey
- Town and municipality
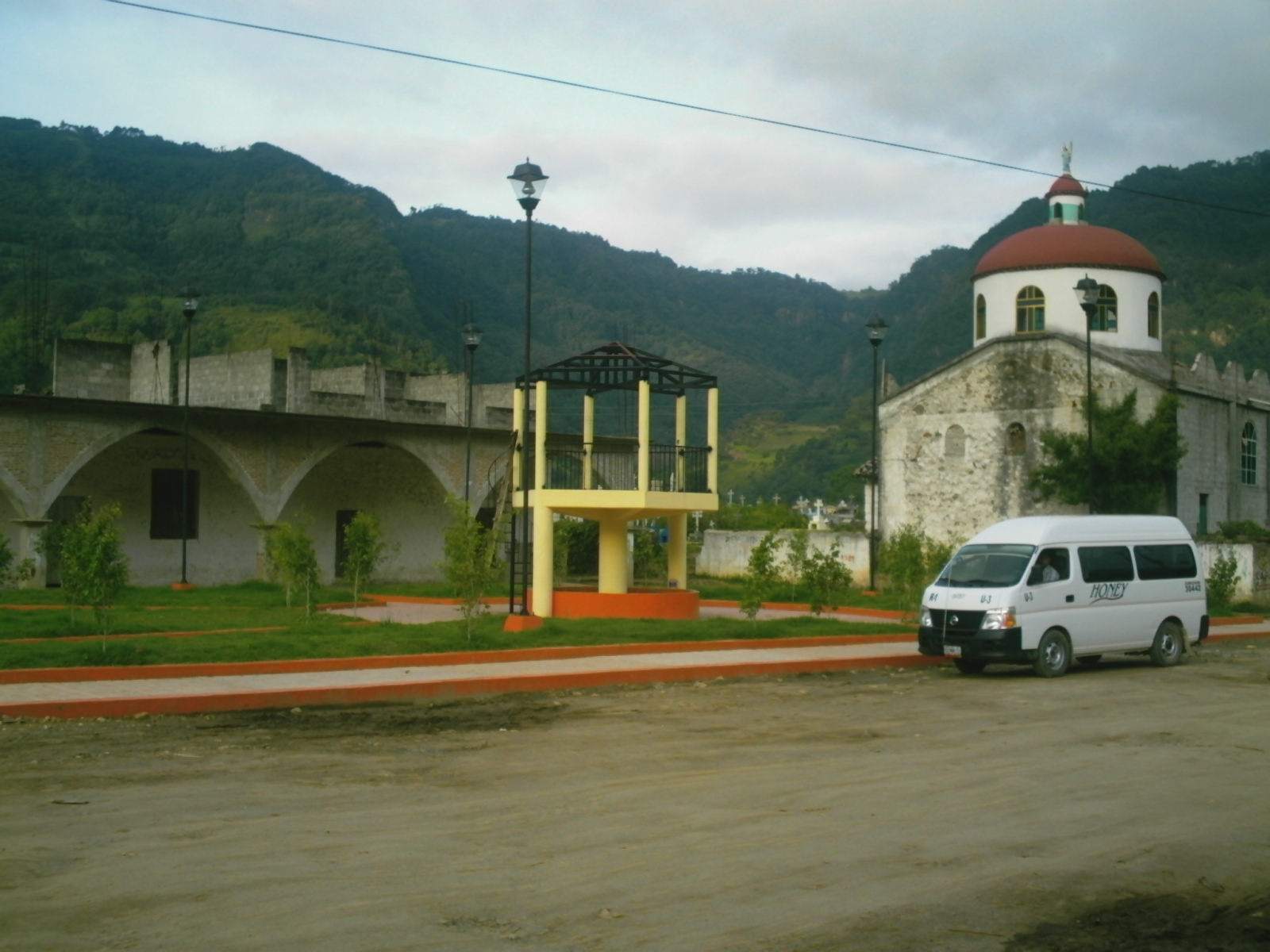

- Coat of arms

- Location within Puebla (state) Location within Mexico
- Coordinates: 20°14′N 98°13′W
- Country: Mexico
- State: Puebla

Population (2015)
  - Total: 7,857
- (municipality)
- Time zone: UTC-6 (Zona Centro)
- Website: honey.gob.mx

Honey is a town in the Sierra Norte region of the Mexican state of Puebla, on the border with the state of Hidalgo. It serves as the seat of the surrounding municipality of the same name.

The municipality was established in April 1919 as Chila Honey, honouring Richard Honey (c. 1829–1913), a 19th-century English immigrant from Cornwall who invested heavily in mining, metallurgy and railways in the area and established a paint factory in the town. In 1993 the name was officially shortened to its present form.
