= Zihuateutla =

Coordinates: 20°15′N 97°53′W

- Municipality and town
- Interactive map of Zihuateutla
- Country: Mexico
- State: Puebla
- Time zone: UTC-6 (Zona Centro)

Zihuateutla is a town and municipality in the Mexican state of Puebla.
