= Francisco Z. Mena =

Coordinates: 20.7297°N 97.8471°W

- Municipality
- Location of the municipality in Puebla
- Country: Mexico
- State: Puebla

Population (2020)
  - Total: 17,824
- Time zone: UTC-6 (Zona Centro)

Francisco Z. Mena is a municipality in the Mexican state of Puebla.

The municipality is named after General Francisco Zacarías Mena (1841-1910).
