= Tlacuilotepec =

Coordinates: 20.3333°N 98.0667°W

- Municipality and town
- Interactive map of Tlacuilotepec
- Country: Mexico
- State: Puebla
- Time zone: UTC-6 (Zona Centro)

Tlacuilotepec is a town and municipality in the Mexican state of Puebla.
