= Pantepec, Puebla =

Coordinates: 20°31′23″N 97°56′21″W

Pantepec
- Municipality
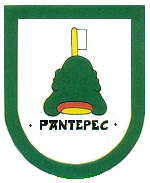
- Coat of arms
- Interactive map of Pantepec
- Country: Mexico
- State: Puebla

Population (2020)
  - Total: 18,528
- Time zone: UTC-6 (Zona Centro)

Pantepec is a municipality in the Mexican state of Puebla.
