= Tlaola =

Coordinates: 20°08′N 97°55′W

- Municipality and town
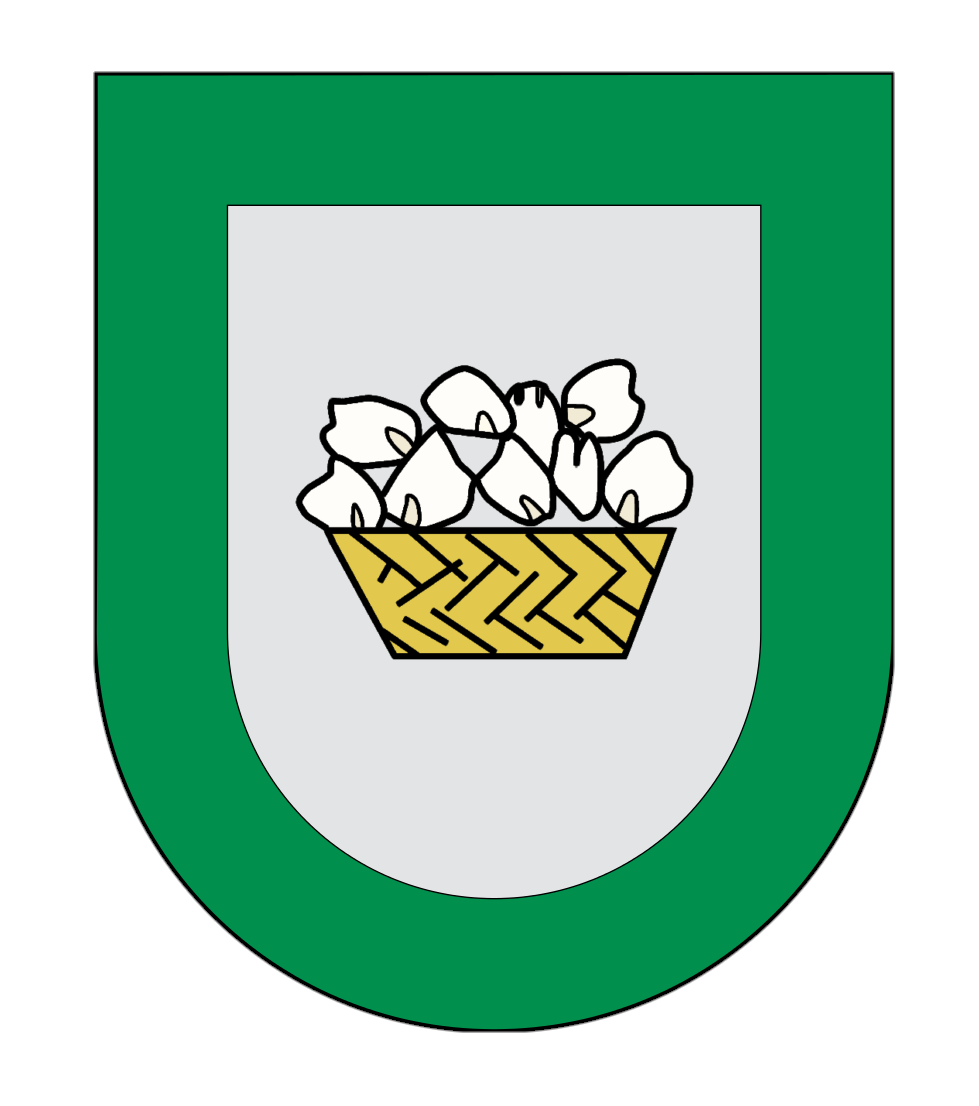
- Coat of arms
- Interactive map of Tlaola
- Country: Mexico
- State: Puebla
- Time zone: UTC-6 (Zona Centro)

Tlaola is a town and municipality in the Mexican state of Puebla.
