= Huauchinango =

- City
- Huauchinango de Degollado
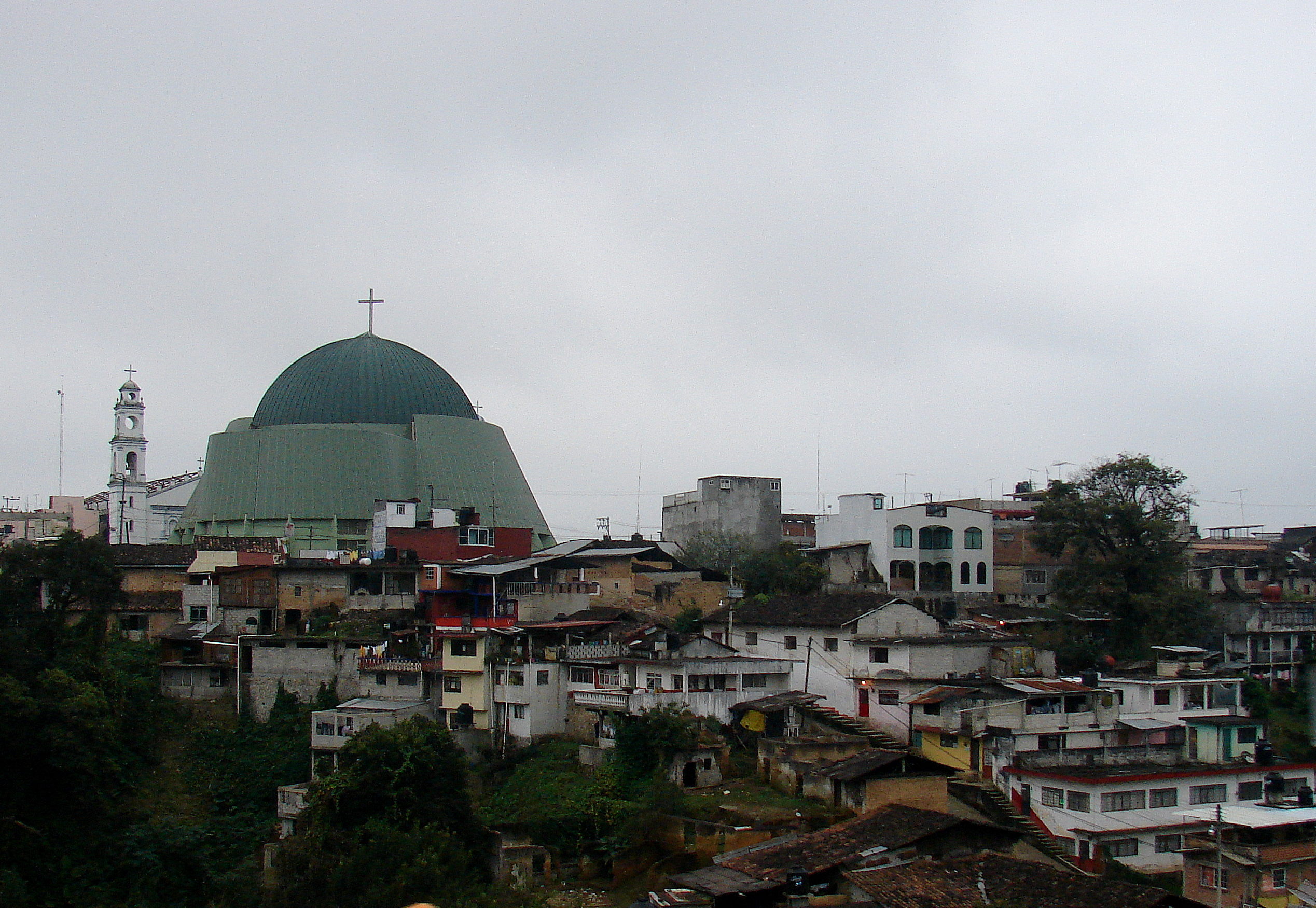
- View of Huauchinango

- Seal

- Location within Puebla (state) Location within Mexico
- Coordinates: 20°10′36″N 98°03′10″W
- Country: Mexico
- State: Puebla
- Municipality: Huauchinango
- Founded: 1116-1121
- Municipal Status: 19th century

Government
  - Municipal President: Carlos Martínez Amador
- Elevation (of seat): 1,519 m (4,984 ft)

Population (2020)
  - Total: 58,957
- Time zone: UTC-6 (Central (US Central))
- Postal code (of seat): 73160
- Area code: 776

Huauchinango (formally, Huauchinango de Degollado, commemorating 19th-century liberal politician and soldier Santos Degollado) is a city in the far north of the state of Puebla in central Mexico. It is located in the rugged Sierra Norte de Puebla mountain region, filled with peaks, ravines and rivers that form waterfalls. The city is home to a locally venerated image called the Señor del Santo Entierro (Lord of the Holy Burial) and also to the area's main commercial fair, the Feria de las Flores, which promotes the area's flower production, especially that of azaleas. It serves as the municipal seat for the surrounding municipality of the same name.

== The city ==
The city of Huauchinango is located about 141 km north from the state capital of Puebla with a driving time of about four hours due to the rugged terrain. As of 2010, the city was classified as medium-sized with a population of 56,206. The main activities of the city and surrounding areas are agriculture, commerce, petroleum and electricity, especially floriculture, with the growing of azaleas, dahlias, violets and others. Many of these can be seen in the city's plazas and other green areas. The historic center of the city is marked by traditional architecture with its pitched roofs covered in red tile and iron-railed balconies. The interior of a number of these structures feature ceiling roses or soffits, most of which date from the time of the Mexican Revolution.

The center of the city is the Plaza de Armas main square with the main streets of the center all leading to it. The plaza is filled with gardens and walkways and surrounded by some of the most important buildings. One of these is the municipal palace with a façade with two sets of arches, of which the upper set serves as a balcony.

The main church is the Santa María de la Asunción Temple. It is easily seen by its 84-meter-wide (276 ft) and 25-meter-tall (82 ft) cupola. Next to this structure is the old monastery complex in which is an important image of a buried Jesus called the Señor del Santo Entierro. Many miracles have been attributed to this image in the region.

There is a cultural center and a municipal library.

=== Señor del Santo Entierro ===
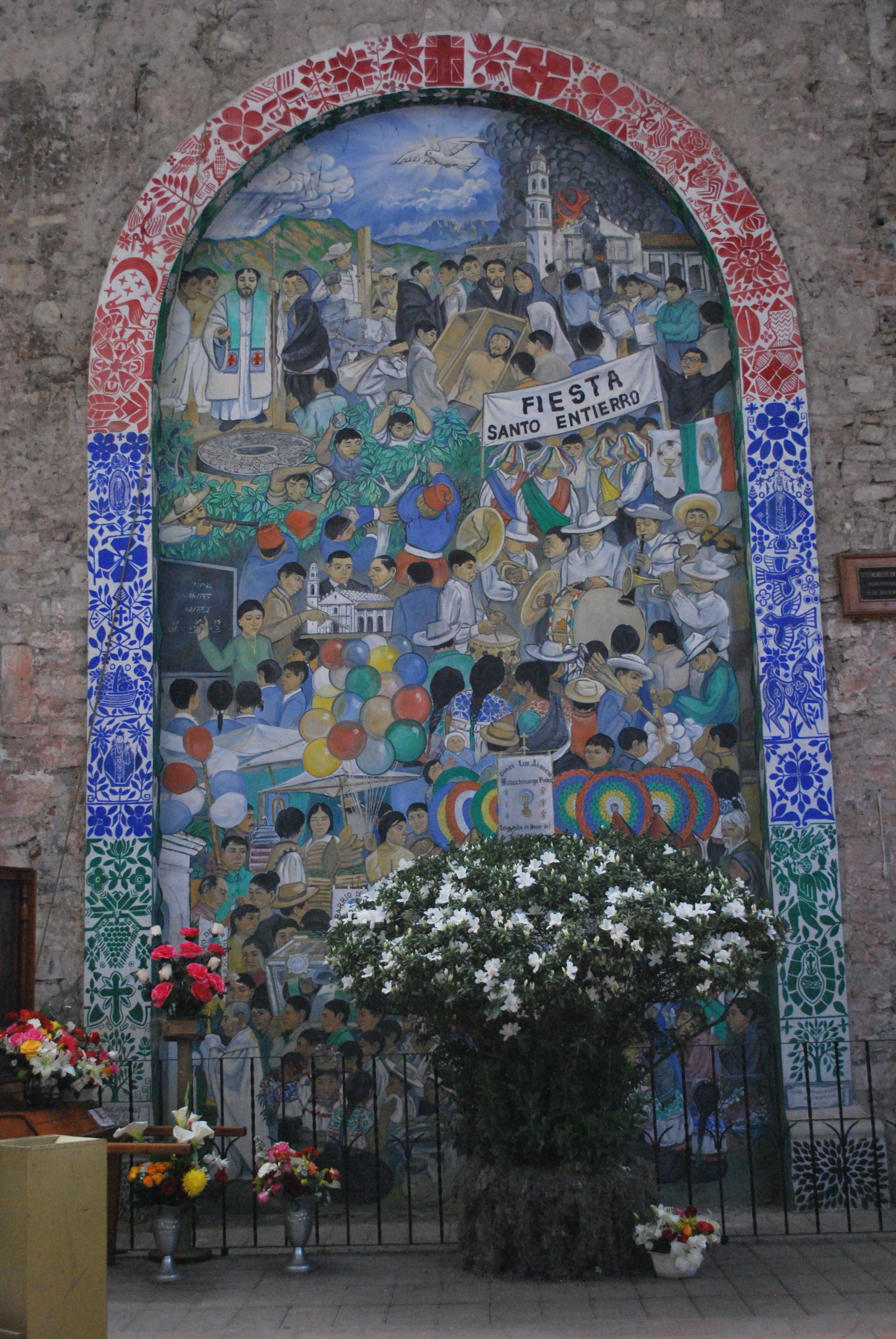
Mural in the sanctuary depicting the annual festival of the Señor del Santo Entierro

The Señor del Santo Entierro (Lord of the Holy Burial) image is that of Jesus as he lay buried after the crucifixion. The story behind the image states that it appeared in Huauchinango about 400 years ago, carried to the city's Augustinian monastery by a mule driver, stopping overnight carrying a wooden crate. In the morning, the driver had disappeared but the crate remained. Out of respect, the crate was not opened for days and when it was, the image was discovered. Attempts to return it to the driver failed, so it was decided to house the image at the monastery's main church. The image has a reputation for being miraculous not only due to the large number of miracles attributed to it, but also because it appears not to have aged over the centuries. At some point in time in Huachinango's history, this image replaced Our Lady of the Assumption as patron saint. However, the annual celebration to honor it was not officially declared until 26 February 1923. This annual event is celebrated by decorating the sanctuary in which the image lies, as well as traditional dancing and singing along with mass. The celebration reenacts the arrival of the image to the city. It begins in the La Aurora neighborhood, with older women decorated with flowers called Xochitonantzi dancing a dance called the Xochipitzahuac. This is then followed by a dance featuring fans. A procession follows, featuring a woman chosen to play the Virgin Mary, but as the Virgin of Guadalupe, who is also acknowledged as an incarnation of the Aztec goddess Tonantzin. The processional path is strewn with flowers as it makes its way to the images sanctuary church.

=== Feria de las Flores ===
The annual celebration of the Señor del Santo Entierro gave rise to the city's main commercial fair, the Feria de las Flores (Flower Fair), celebrating the main agricultural product of the municipality. It began in 1938 coinciding with the religious event and now runs for nine days beginning on the first Sunday of Lent. It includes dances, cockfights, charreada and parades. It exhibits locally grown flowers and ornamental plants such as azaleas along with cultural items such as paintings by local artists, films, plays and recitals. The highlight is the crowning of the Reina de las Flores (Flower Queen) done by the Governor of the state of Puebla. In 1982, the state began to promote the event nationally and internationally. It is still dedicated to the patron saint of the city, the Señor del Santo Entierro. The 2011 event brought in an estimated ten million pesos to the city.

== The municipality ==
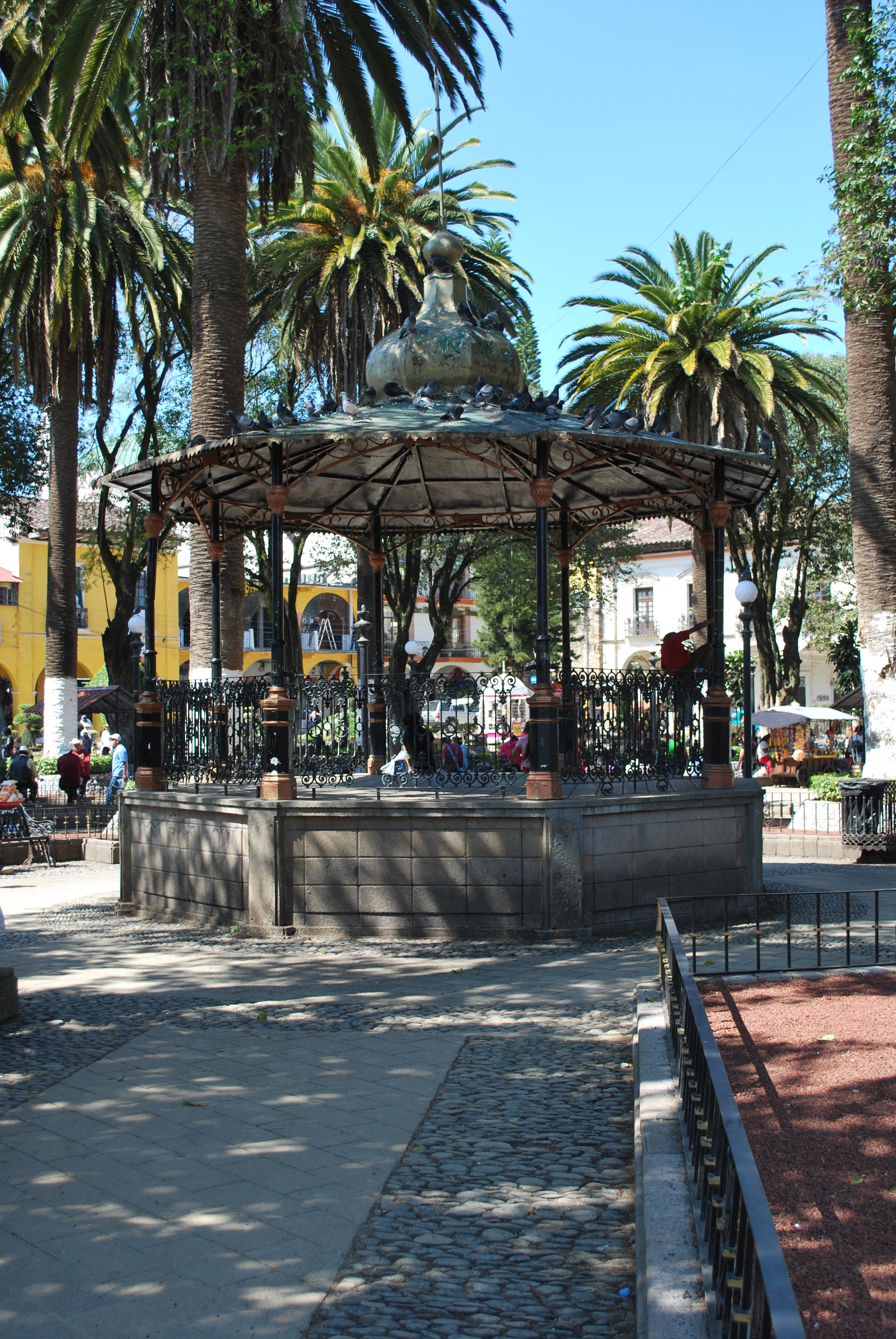
Kiosk in the main plaza of Huauchinango

The city of Huauchinango is the seat of government for 71 active communities, which together cover an area of 160.75 km^{2} (62.07 sq mi) and have a total population of 97,753. However, 57.5% of this population lives in the city proper. This municipality borders the municipalities of Xicotepec de Juárez, Juan Galindo, Ahuazotepec, Zacatlán, Tlaola, Naupan as well as the state of Hidalgo. The municipal government is formed by a municipal president, a syndicate, and ten representatives called regidors. It has commissions on governing, taxes, public safety, industry and commerce, public works, health, education, culture, sports and ecology.

Aside from the seat, the most important of these are Tenango de las Flores, El Potro, Cuacuila, Ahuacatlán and Xaltepec. Tenango de las Flores is located about 14 km from the municipal seat with a population of about 6,200. Its main economic activity is the cultivating of flowers. Cuacuila is located about five km from the municipal seat with a population of about 2,400. Its main economic activity is agriculture. Las Colonias de Hidalgo is located about 15 km from the municipal seat with a population of about 2,150. Its main economic activity is agriculture. Tlacomulco is located eight km from the municipal seat with a population of about 1,500. Its main economic activity is agriculture. Ahuacatlán is located about eight km from the municipal seat with a population of about 1,200. Its main economic activity is agriculture. Xaltepec is about ten km from the municipal seat with a population of about 1,750. Its main economic activity is agriculture.

The most traditional dance of the area is called the Xochipitlamas and the most traditional instrument is the violin. Traditional dress for women includes a black wool skirt with stripes, worn with a square neck blouse which is embroidered, a red belt and a poncho garment called a quezquémetl. For men, the traditional dress consists of pants and shirt in plain cotton, with a wrap belt, a hat woven from palm fronds, huarache sandals, a bag and machete. Dishes of the area include various chicken dishes such as smoked, grilled and with mushrooms. Another is mole poblano with rice and "salsa de hormiga" (lit. ant sauce).

At the 2010 census a total of 22,387 people over the age of five spoke an indigenous language, almost all of which are bilingual. About eleven percent of the population has no schooling at all, with about fifteen percent completing only primary and nineteen percent completing only middle school. The average years of schooling in the municipality is 7.9 years.

== History ==
The name is derived from the Nahuatl phrase Cuauhchinanco which means within a wall of trees. It has a coat of arms which consists of a rampant lion in gold on a black background.

The first Mesoamerican society in the area was the Chichimecas led by Nopaltzin which arrived between 1116 and 1121 CE. Here a dominion was established, but it was conquered by the Acolhua ruler Nezahualcoyotl, who sent calpixque here. As a tribute province of the Aztec Empire, Cuauhchinanco provided servants for the palaces of Tetzcoco. It was also had military importance as a point for Aztec armies to rest, restock and gather intelligence, and even contributed provisions and troops to Aztec campaigns against the Huastecs. During the reign of Ahuitzotl, the ruler of Cuauhchinanco was named Xochitl tecuhtli. There were two maize harvests annually and a cotton harvest once every two years, and liquidambar was a prominent local resource. Cuauhchinanco lay upon an important route between the highlands and lowlands. According to different sources, Cuauhchinanco dominated either 35 or 64 subject towns.

The first Spanish ruler for the area was Juan de Jaso, who was in charge of the encomienda. Tribute at this time consisted of clothing, honey, wax, liquidambar, chairs, labor in cotton and maize fields, and other services and household products. Huauchinango would remain an encomienda until the 18th century, with the last encomendero being José Sarmiento de Valldares, Count of Moctezuma and Duke of Atlixco. In 1792, it became part of the Puebla province.

During the 19th century, troops from the area fought in the Mexican War of Independence, the Mexican American War and the French Intervention in Mexico, especially the Battle of Puebla. The French were expelled from the town in 1863 by General Miguel Negrete. In 1861, the town's official name became Huauchinango de Degollado to honor Reform War hero, Santos Degollado. In 1863, it became a local headquarters for Liberal forces.

During the Mexican Revolution, the town was taken in June 1914 by Francisco I. Madero follower of Emiliano Márquez. It was taken again in 1915 by a faction under the leadership of Coronel Alejandro Denis.

The annual celebration to honor the patron saint of the city, the Señor del Santo Entierro was officially declared in 1923. This annual event gave rise to the city's major commercial event, the Feria de las Flores starting in 1938. In 1982, the state of Puebla began to promote the event nationally and internationally.

== Geography ==
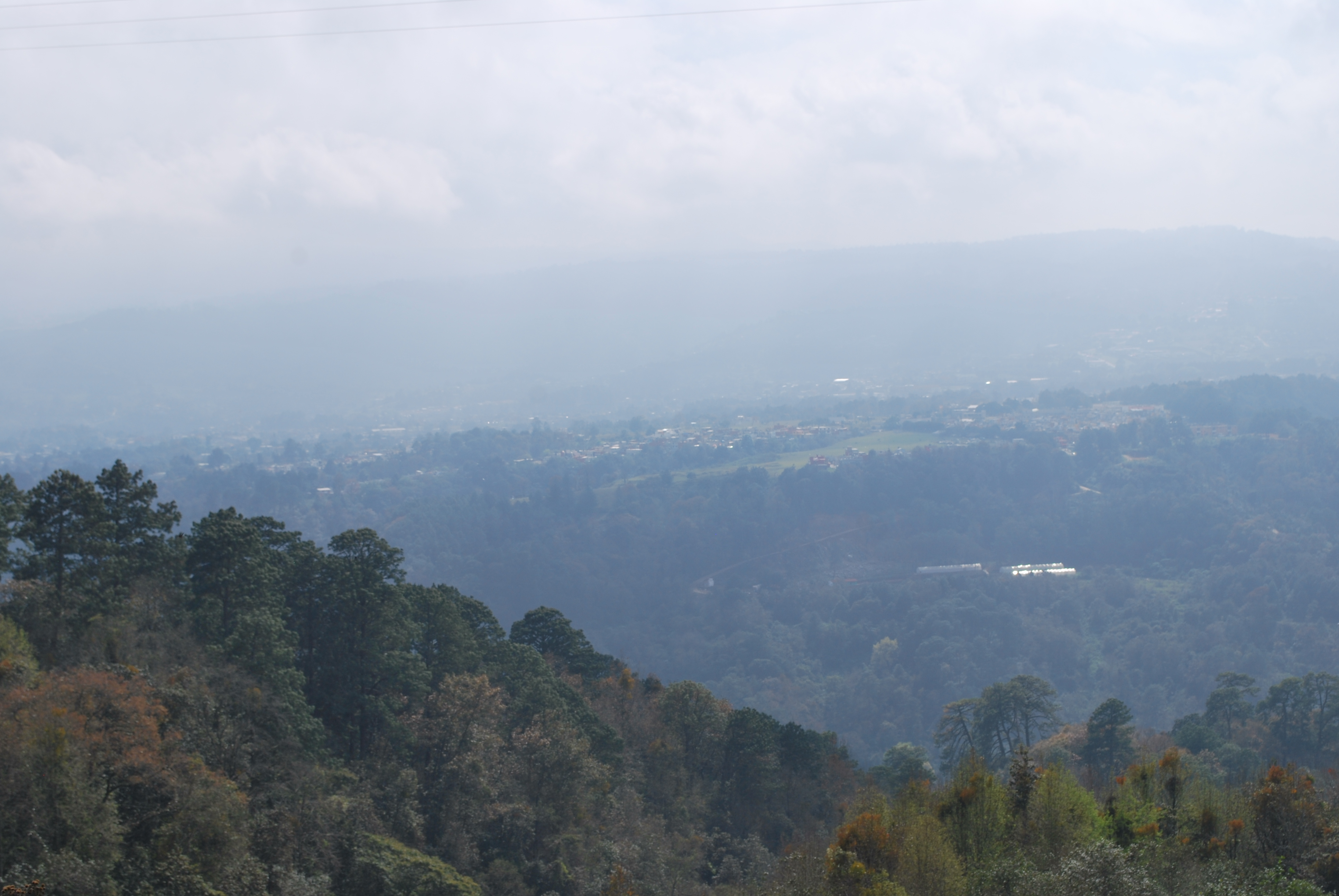
Valley area near the city

The area around the city is filled with dozens of waterfalls, streams, dams and pine forest, which has not varied too much since the arrival of the Chichimecas. The municipality is located in the Sierra Norte de Puebla region, which is part of the Sierra Madre Oriental. The terrain is rugged with numerous mountains, waterfalls and deep depressions, with altitudes varying from between 1000 and 3000 meters above sea level. The highest altitudes are found in the southwest with the lowest areas in the northeast near the Necaxa and Tenango Dams. Main peaks include Teochocatitla, Huitzipetl, Azacamitl, Ixipetl, Chiltepetl, Cojuinalayola, Osamatípetl, Netatiltépetl and Tlahuatzapila. A noted peak near the city is Necaxaltepetl whose summit is frequently climbed by hikers.

=== Hydrography ===
Most of the municipality is part of the Necaxa River basin with the extreme northeast belonging to the San Marcos River basin. The Nexaca forms in the south of the municipality, flowing southwest to northwest through deep ravines and forming waterfalls such as the Salto Chico and Salto Grande, both of which are used to generate electricity. The river feeds the Necaxa Dam along with tributaries such as the Texcapa, Chapultepec, La Malva, Hayatlaco, Dos Puentes, Xoctongo, Mazontla and Cuacuila. In the north, the main river is the Naupan, which is a tributary of the San Marcos River. Part of the Necaxa Dam reservoir is in the municipality. This dam was construction in 1900 and filled by the waters of the Necaxa and Tenango Rivers. In addition to water storage, the dam also generates electricity for the area. Other notable waterfalls include the Ocpaco, Totolapa and Teopancingo.

=== Climate ===
The area is one of the wettest in the state of Puebla, mostly due to moisture from the Gulf of Mexico. The municipality has two climates. One is humid and temperate with rains year round and an average annual temperature of between 12 and 18 °C (54 and 64 °F). The other is semi hot and semi-humid with rains all year and an average annual temperature over 18 °C (64 °F). The latter is found in the lowest elevations on the east side.

=== Flora and fauna ===
Wild vegetation mostly consists of forest of pines and pine-holm oak, warm climate mountain forest, and some high growth rainforest in isolated pockets. Wildlife includes armadillos, foxes, ducks, rabbits, moles, opossums, bats, with some endangered species such as deer, wild cats, porcupines and coyotes.

== Economy ==
The main economy activity for the municipality is agriculture, especially floriculture, which specializes in azaleas. The municipality grows 1,600 varieties of azaleas. There are trout farms in Teopancingo. Carp is raised in the Tenango Dam. Handcrafts include embroidered blouses, baskets, amate paper, and the weaving of belts, skirts, quechquemetls and more. There are also small industries which manufacture shoes and tile.

The municipality has seventeen hotels. Four kilometers outside of the city is the Puente Totolapa, which is a trout farm and day camping destination. Most people come to fish but it also offers hiking, mountain biking and swimming.
