= Jalpan, Puebla =

Coordinates: 20.4888°N 97.9412°W

Jalpan
- Municipality and town
- Location of the municipality in Puebla
- Country: Mexico
- State: Puebla

Population (2010)
  - Total: 12,547
- Time zone: UTC-6 (Zona Centro)

Jalpan is a town and municipality in the Mexican state of Puebla.
