= Naupan =

Coordinates: 20°14′N 98°07′W

- Municipality
- Coat of arms

- Location of the municipality in Puebla
- Country: Mexico
- State: Puebla
- Municipal seat: Naupan

Government
  - Presidente Municipal: Jaime Rodriguez Ramirez (2011-2014)

Area
  - Total: 60.4 km^{2} (23.3 sq mi)
- Elevation: 2,097 m (6,880 ft)

Population (2010)
  - Total: 9,707
- Time zone: UTC-6 (Zona Centro)
- Postal code: 73140

Naupan is a municipality in Puebla.
