= Area codes in Mexico by code (200–299) =

The 200–299 range of area codes in Mexico is reserved for the states of Puebla, Tlaxcala, Oaxaca, and Veracruz. The country code of Mexico is 52.

For other areas, see Area codes in Mexico by code.

City	State	Code	Ref.
Puebla	Puebla	220 / 221 / 222	
Amozoc | Puebla	Puebla	220 / 221 / 222	
Chipilo de Francisco Javier Mina (Chipilo)	Puebla	220 / 221 / 222	
Cholula de Rivadabia	Puebla	220 / 221 / 222	
Estación San Diego	Puebla	220 / 221 / 222	
Las Haras Lucero	Puebla	220 / 221 / 222	
Los Angeles Tetela	Puebla	220 / 221 / 222	
Martiniano Hernández (San José Xilotzingo)	Puebla	220 / 221 / 222	
Mazatecochco	Puebla	220 / 221 / 222	
El Oasis Valsequillo	Puebla	220 / 221 / 222	
Papalotla	Puebla	220 / 221 / 222	
Puebla	Puebla	220 / 221 / 222	
San Andrés Azumiatla	Puebla	220 / 221 / 222	
San Andrés Cholula	Puebla	220 / 221 / 222	
San Baltazar Tetela	Puebla	220 / 221 / 222	
San Francisco Cuapa	Puebla	220 / 221 / 222	
San Francisco Ocotlán	Puebla	220 / 221 / 222	
San José Tlautla	Puebla	220 / 221 / 222	
San Juan Cuautlancingo	Puebla	220 / 221 / 222	
San Luis Tehuiloyocan	Puebla	220 / 221 / 222	
San Martín Tlamapa	Puebla	220 / 221 / 222	
San Martinito	Puebla	220 / 221 / 222	
San Miguel Canoa	Puebla	220 / 221 / 222	
San Miguel Xoxtla	Puebla	220 / 221 / 222	
San Pedro Tonantzintla	Puebla	220 / 221 / 222	
San Pedro Zacachimalpa	Puebla	220 / 221 / 222	
San Sebastián Aparicio	Puebla	220 / 221 / 222	
Santa Clara Ocoyucan	Puebla	220 / 221 / 222	
Santa Isabel Cholula	Puebla	220 / 221 / 222	
Santa María Coronango	Puebla	220 / 221 / 222	
Santa María Malacatepec	Puebla	220 / 221 / 222	
Santa María Xonacatepec	Puebla	220 / 221 / 222	
Santiago Momoxpan	Puebla	220 / 221 / 222	
Santo Tomás Chautla	Puebla	220 / 221 / 222	
Tlaltenango	Puebla	220 / 221 / 222	
Tonantzintla	Puebla	220 / 221 / 222	
Villa Vicente Guerrero	Puebla	220 / 221 / 222	
Xicohtzinco	Puebla	220 / 221 / 222	
La Magdalena Tetela Morelos	Puebla	223	
Santa María Ixtiyucan	Puebla	223	
Santa María Nenetzintla	Puebla	223	
Tepatlaxco de Hidalgo	Puebla	223	
Tepeaca	Puebla	223	
Zitlaltepec	Tlaxcala	223	
Almolonga	Puebla	224	
Atoyatempan	Puebla	224	
Chigmecatitlán	Puebla	224	
Huatlatlauca	Puebla	224	
Huejonapan (San Antonio)	Puebla	224	
Molcaxac	Puebla	224	
San Juan Ixcaquixtla	Puebla	224	
San Luis Ajajalpan	Puebla	224	
San Miguel Acuexcomac	Puebla	224	
San Miguel Zacaola	Puebla	224	
Santa Inés Ahuatempan	Puebla	224	
Santa Isabel Tlanepantla	Puebla	224	
Santo Tomás Hueyotlipán	Puebla	224	
Tecali de Herrera	Puebla	224	
Tepexi de Rodríguez	Puebla	224	
Tochtepec	Puebla	224	
Zacapala	Puebla	224	
La Palmilla	Veracruz	225	
Tlapacoyan	Veracruz	225	
Altotonga	Veracruz	226	
Jalacingo	Veracruz	226	
Orilla del Monte	Veracruz	226	
Plan de Arroyos	Veracruz	226	
Huejotzingo	Puebla	227	
San Andrés Calpan	Puebla	227	
San Buenaventura Nealtican	Puebla	227	
San Jeronimo Tecuanipan	Puebla	227	
San Mateo Ozolco	Puebla	227	
San Nicólas los Ranchos	Puebla	227	
Santa Ana Xalmimilulco	Puebla	227	
Santa María Atexcac	Puebla	227	
Santa María Nepopualco	Puebla	227	
Acajete	Veracruz	228	
Banderilla	Veracruz	228	
Coacoatzintla	Veracruz	228	
Coatepec	Veracruz	228	
Colonia Santa Barbara	Veracruz	228	
Chiltoyac	Veracruz	228	
Dos Ríos	Veracruz	228	
El Chico	Veracruz	228	
Estanzuela	Veracruz	228	
Jalapa (Xalapa)	Veracruz	228	
La Concepción	Veracruz	228	
La Joya	Veracruz	228	
Las Trancas	Veracruz	228	
Mahuixtlán	Veracruz	228	
Pacho Viejo	Veracruz	228	
Tuzamapan	Veracruz	228	
Xico	Veracruz	228	
Boca del Río	Veracruz	229	
Colonia El Renacimiento	Veracruz	229	
El Conchal	Veracruz	229	
Valente Díaz	Veracruz	229	
Vargas	Veracruz	229	
Veracruz	Veracruz	229	
Chignautla	Puebla	231	
Ixtahuiata (La Legua)	Puebla	231	
Teteles	Puebla	231	
Teziutlán	Puebla	231	
Hueytamalco	Puebla	232	
San José Acateno	Puebla	232	
Arroyo del Potrero	Veracruz	232	
Cañada Rica	Veracruz	232	
Casitas	Veracruz	232	
El Ojite	Veracruz	232	
El Pital	Veracruz	232	
Felipe Carrillo Puerto	Veracruz	232	
Hueytepec	Veracruz	232	
La Vigueta	Veracruz	232	
Manantiales	Veracruz	232	
Martínez de la Torre	Veracruz	232	
San Rafael	Veracruz	232	
Ayotoxco de Guerrero	Puebla	233	
Caxhuacan	Puebla	233	
Cuetzalán	Puebla	233	
Huehuetla	Puebla	233	
Ixtepec	Puebla	233	
Jonotla	Puebla	233	
Mazatepec	Puebla	233	
Nauzontla	Puebla	233	
Ocotlán	Puebla	233	
Oyameles	Puebla	233	
San Miguel Tenextatiloyan	Puebla	233	
Santiago Zautla	Puebla	233	
Tatauzoquico	Puebla	233	
Tenampulco	Puebla	233	
Tlatlauquitepec	Puebla	233	
Xochiapulco	Puebla	233	
Xonocuautla	Puebla	233	
Zacapoaxtla	Puebla	233	
Zaragoza	Puebla	233	
Arroyo Hondo	Veracruz	235	
Barra de Palmas	Veracruz	235	
Emilio Carranza	Veracruz	235	
Francisco Sarabia	Veracruz	235	
Jicaltepec	Veracruz	235	
La Defensa	Veracruz	235	
La Libertad	Veracruz	235	
Loma Bonita	Veracruz	235	
Misantla	Veracruz	235	
Nautla	Veracruz	235	
Vega de Alatorre	Veracruz	235	
Venustiano Carranza	Veracruz	235	
Cuicatlán	Oaxaca	236	
Huautla de Jiménez	Oaxaca	236	
San Andrés Hidalgo	Oaxaca	236	
Santa María Tecomavaca	Oaxaca	236	
Teotitlán de Flores Magón	Oaxaca	236	
Ajalpan	Puebla	236	
Altepexi	Puebla	236	
Calipan	Puebla	236	
San José Axuxco	Puebla	236	
San José Miahuatlán	Puebla	236	
San José Tilapa	Puebla	236	
San Sebastián Zinacatepec	Puebla	236	
Santa María del Monte	Puebla	236	
Zoquitlán	Puebla	236	
San Antonio Texcala	Puebla	237	
San Gabriel Chilac	Puebla	237	
San José Tlacuitlapan	Puebla	237	
San Simon Yehualtepec	Puebla	237	
Tlacotepec	Puebla	237	
Zapotitlán Salinas	Puebla	237	
Azumbilla	Puebla	238	
José María Pino Suárez	Puebla	238	
Nicolás Bravo	Puebla	238	
San Marcos Necoxtla	Puebla	238	
Santiago Miahuatlán	Puebla	238	
Tehuacán	Puebla	238	
Tepanco de López	Puebla	238	
Acopinalco del Peñón	Tlaxcala	241	
Apizaco	Tlaxcala	241	
El Rosario	Tlaxcala	241	
Emiliano Zapata	Tlaxcala	241	
Españita	Tlaxcala	241	
Hueyotlipan	Tlaxcala	241	
La Ascención Huitzcolotepec	Tlaxcala	241	
Lazaro Cárdenas	Tlaxcala	241	
Mazaquiahuac	Tlaxcala	241	
Muñoz	Tlaxcala	241	
San Cosme Xalostoc	Tlaxcala	241	
San José Atotonilco	Tlaxcala	241	
San Martín Xaltocan	Tlaxcala	241	
San Salvador Tzompantepec	Tlaxcala	241	
San Simeon Xipetzinco	Tlaxcala	241	
Terrenate	Tlaxcala	241	
Tetla	Tlaxcala	241	
Tlaxco	Tlaxcala	241	
Unión Ejidal Tierra y Libertad	Tlaxcala	241	
Ahuatlán	Puebla	243	
Atencingo	Puebla	243	
Ayotla	Puebla	243	
Coatzingo	Puebla	243	
Chietla	Puebla	243	
Escape de Lagunillas	Puebla	243	
Izúcar de Matamoros	Puebla	243	
La Galarza	Puebla	243	
Lagunillas de Rayón (Alchichica)	Puebla	243	
Pueblo Nuevo de Porfirio Díaz	Puebla	243	
San Carlos (San Carlos Buenavi)	Puebla	243	
San Felipe Ayutla	Puebla	243	
San Felix Rijo	Puebla	243	
San Juan Calmeca	Puebla	243	
San Juan Epatlán	Puebla	243	
San Juan Raboso	Puebla	243	
San Lucas Colucán	Puebla	243	
Santa María Xuchapa	Puebla	243	
Santo Domingo Huehuetlán	Puebla	243	
Teopantlán	Puebla	243	
Tepexco	Puebla	243	
Tilapa	Puebla	243	
Zolonquiapa	Puebla	243	
Col. Agr. De Ocotepec	Puebla	244	
Atlixco	Puebla	244	
Emiliano Zapata Nexatengo	Puebla	244	
Huaquechula	Puebla	244	
La Magdalena Yancuitlalpan	Puebla	244	
La Trinidad	Puebla	244	
Rancho La Venta	Puebla	244	
San Félix Hidalgo	Puebla	244	
San Jerónimo Coyula	Puebla	244	
San Juan Amecac	Puebla	244	
San Juan Bautista	Puebla	244	
San Lucas Tulcingo	Puebla	244	
San Pedro Benito Juárez	Puebla	244	
Santa Catarina Coatepec	Puebla	244	
Santa Cruz Cuautomatitla	Puebla	244	
Santa Lucía Cosamaloapan	Puebla	244	
Santa María Xoyatla	Puebla	244	
Santo Domingo Atoyatempan	Puebla	244	
Tepeojuma	Puebla	244	
Tianguismanalco	Puebla	244	
Tlapanala	Puebla	244	
Tochimilco	Puebla	244	
Tronconal	Puebla	244	
Atzitzintla	Puebla	245	
Ciudad Serdán	Puebla	245	
El Veladero (Santa Cruz Velader)	Puebla	245	
Esperanza	Puebla	245	
San Juan Atenco	Puebla	245	
San Nicolás de Buenos Aires	Puebla	245	
Tlachichuca	Puebla	245	
Alcotitla (Xaltipan)	Tlaxcala	246	
Chiautempan	Tlaxcala	246	
Panotla	Tlaxcala	246	
San Bartolomé Cuahuixmatlac	Tlaxcala	246	
San Damián Texoloc	Tlaxcala	246	
San Marcos Contla	Tlaxcala	246	
San Pedro Tlalcuapan de Nicolás	Tlaxcala	246	
San Rafael Tenanyecac	Tlaxcala	246	
San Tadeo Huiloapan	Tlaxcala	246	
Santa Ana Nopalucan	Tlaxcala	246	
Santa María Nativitas	Tlaxcala	246	
Tlaxcala	Tlaxcala	246	
Zacatelco	Tlaxcala	246	
Huamantla	Tlaxcala	247	
Ixtenco	Tlaxcala	247	
Xicotencatl	Tlaxcala	247	
Guadalupe Zaragoza	Puebla	248	
La Preciosita	Puebla	248	
San Antonio Chiautla de Arenas	Puebla	248	
San Baltazar Temaxcalac	Puebla	248	
San Buenaventura Tecaltzingo	Puebla	248	
San Felipe Teotlalcingo	Puebla	248	
San Francisco Tepeyecac	Puebla	248	
San Jerónimo Tianguismanalco	Puebla	248	
San Juan Cuauhtémoc	Puebla	248	
San Lorenzo Chiautzingo	Puebla	248	
San Lucas El Grande	Puebla	248	
San Martín Texmelucan de Labastida	Puebla	248	
San Pedro Matamoros	Puebla	248	
San Rafael Tlanalapan	Puebla	248	
San Salvador El Verde	Puebla	248	
Santa María Moyotzingo	Puebla	248	
Santa Rita Tlahuapan	Puebla	248	
Santiago Coltzingo	Puebla	248	
San Antonio Atotonilco	Tlaxcala	248	
San Mateo Tepetitla	Tlaxcala	248	
Santiago Xochimilco	Tlaxcala	248	
Villa Mariano Matamoros	Tlaxcala	248	
Acatzingo	Puebla	249	
Barrio La Soledad	Puebla	249	
Garcías	Puebla	249	
Los Reyes de Juárez	Puebla	249	
Morelos Cañada	Puebla	249	
Palmar de Bravo	Puebla	249	
Palmarito Tochapan	Puebla	249	
San José Ixtapa	Puebla	249	
San Miguel Tecuitlapa	Puebla	249	
San Pablo de las Tunas	Puebla	249	
San Salvador El Seco	Puebla	249	
San Salvador Huixcolotla	Puebla	249	
San Sebastián Villanueva	Puebla	249	
San Simón de Bravo	Puebla	249	
Santiago Alseseca	Puebla	249	
Santiago Tenango	Puebla	249	
Soltepec	Puebla	249	
Tecamachalco	Puebla	249	
Tezuapan	Puebla	249	
Amatlán de los Reyes	Veracruz	271	
Cacahuatal	Veracruz	271	
Córdoba	Veracruz	271	
Cuautlapan	Veracruz	271	
Fortín de las Flores	Veracruz	271	
Monte Salas	Veracruz	271	
Naranjal	Veracruz	271	
Ojo de Agua Grande (California)	Veracruz	271	
Paraje Nuevo	Veracruz	271	
San Matías (Los Mangos)	Veracruz	271	
Acultzingo	Veracruz	272	
Ciudad Mendoza	Veracruz	272	
Cruz Verde	Veracruz	272	
Dos Ríos (Tocuila)	Veracruz	272	
Ixtaczoquitlán	Veracruz	272	
Jalapilla	Veracruz	272	
Loma Grande	Veracruz	272	
Maltrata	Veracruz	272	
Orizaba	Veracruz	272	
Río Blanco	Veracruz	272	
Sumidero	Veracruz	272	
Zapoapan	Veracruz	272	
Boca del Monte	Veracruz	273	
Camarón de Tejeda	Veracruz	273	
Colonia Manuel González	Veracruz	273	
Coscomatepec	Veracruz	273	
Chocamán	Veracruz	273	
Huatusco	Veracruz	273	
Ixhuatlán del Café	Veracruz	273	
Monte Blanco	Veracruz	273	
Paso del Macho	Veracruz	273	
Potrero	Veracruz	273	
Tepatlaxco	Veracruz	273	
Tetelzingo	Veracruz	273	
Tlacotepec de Mejía	Veracruz	273	
Tomatlán	Veracruz	273	
Totutla	Veracruz	273	
Acatlán de Pérez Figueroa	Oaxaca	274	
Temascal	Oaxaca	274	
Tetela	Oaxaca	274	
Vicente Camalote	Oaxaca	274	
El Jícaro	Veracruz	274	
Joachín	Veracruz	274	
Tierra Blanca	Veracruz	274	
Villa Tejeda	Veracruz	274	
Acaxtlahuacán de Albino Zertuche	Puebla	275	
Aguacatitlán	Puebla	275	
Ahuehuetitla	Puebla	275	
Axutla	Puebla	275	
Chiautla de Tapia	Puebla	275	
Chila de la Sal	Puebla	275	
Chinantla	Puebla	275	
Guadalupe Santa Ana	Puebla	275	
Guadalupe Victoria	Puebla	275	
Huachinantla	Puebla	275	
Huehuetlán El Chico	Puebla	275	
Ixcamilpa	Puebla	275	
Jolalpan	Puebla	275	
La Noria Hidalgo	Puebla	275	
Progreso	Puebla	275	
San Antonio Chiltepec	Puebla	275	
San Miguel de Lozano	Puebla	275	
San Miguel Tlaltepexi	Puebla	275	
San Pablo Amicano	Puebla	275	
San Pedro Cuayuca	Puebla	275	
Tecomatlán	Puebla	275	
Tehuitzingo	Puebla	275	
Tulcingo de Valle	Puebla	275	
Tzicatlán	Puebla	275	
Cuyoaco	Puebla	276	
Libres	Puebla	276	
Ocotepec	Puebla	276	
Oriental	Puebla	276	
San Andrés Payuca	Puebla	276	
San José Chiapa	Puebla	276	
Villa Rafael Lara Grajales	Puebla	276	
Altzayanca	Tlaxcala	276	
San Lorenzo Cuapiaxtla	Tlaxcala	276	
Tequexquitla	Tlaxcala	276	
Almilinga	Veracruz	278	
Campo Cuichapa	Veracruz	278	
Cotaxtla	Veracruz	278	
Cuitláhuac	Veracruz	278	
El Cuajilote	Veracruz	278	
El Tamarindo	Veracruz	278	
Emiliano Zapata	Veracruz	278	
La Capilla	Veracruz	278	
La Tinaja	Veracruz	278	
Laguna Chica (Pueblo Nuevo)	Veracruz	278	
Loma Angosta	Veracruz	278	
Mata Tenatito (Casco Hacienda)	Veracruz	278	
Omealca	Veracruz	278	
Paraíso La Reforma	Veracruz	278	
Tequila	Veracruz	278	
Tezonapa	Veracruz	278	
Yanga	Veracruz	278	
Zongolica	Veracruz	278	
Acatlán	Veracruz	279	
Actopan	Veracruz	279	
Alto Lucero	Veracruz	279	
Apazapán	Veracruz	279	
Blanca Espuma	Veracruz	279	
Buena Vista	Veracruz	279	
Cerro Gordo	Veracruz	279	
Colipa	Veracruz	279	
Cosautlán de Carvajal	Veracruz	279	
Coyolillo	Veracruz	279	
Cristóbal Hidalgo	Veracruz	279	
Chahuapán	Veracruz	279	
Chavarrillo	Veracruz	279	
Chiconquiaco	Veracruz	279	
Chicuasén	Veracruz	279	
Dos Arroyos	Veracruz	279	
El Espinal	Veracruz	279	
Idolos	Veracruz	279	
Jalcomulco	Veracruz	279	
Juchique de Ferrer	Veracruz	279	
La Reforma	Veracruz	279	
Limones	Veracruz	279	
Mesa de Guadalupe	Veracruz	279	
Naolinco de Victoria	Veracruz	279	
Pacho Nuevo	Veracruz	279	
Paso de la Milpa	Veracruz	279	
Plan de las Hayas	Veracruz	279	
Rinconada	Veracruz	279	
Santa Ana	Veracruz	279	
Santiago Xihuitlán	Veracruz	279	
Teocelo	Veracruz	279	
Tepetlán	Veracruz	279	
Tigrillos	Veracruz	279	
Tlaltetela	Veracruz	279	
Trapiche del Rosario	Veracruz	279	
Villa Emiliano Zapata (El Carrizal)	Veracruz	279	
Yecuatla	Veracruz	279	
Loma Bonita	Oaxaca	281	
Cuauhtémoc	Puebla	282	
González Ortega	Puebla	282	
Guadalupe Victoria	Puebla	282	
Quimixtlán	Puebla	282	
Rafael J. García	Puebla	282	
San José Alchichica	Puebla	282	
Santa Cruz Quechulac	Puebla	282	
Tepeyahualco	Puebla	282	
El Parador	Veracruz	282	
Ixhuacán de los Reyes	Veracruz	282	
La Gloria	Veracruz	282	
Los Altos	Veracruz	282	
Los Molinos (San José)	Veracruz	282	
Perote	Veracruz	282	
Rafael Ramirez (Las Vigas)	Veracruz	282	
San Antonio Tenextepec	Veracruz	282	
Villa Aldama	Veracruz	282	
Ayotzintepec	Oaxaca	283	
Lombardo de Caso	Oaxaca	283	
San Juan Bautista Valle Nacional	Oaxaca	283	
Abasolo del Valle	Veracruz	283	
Boca del Monte	Veracruz	283	
El Nigromante	Veracruz	283	
Isla	Veracruz	283	
Linda Vista	Veracruz	283	
Los Tigres (San Marcos)	Veracruz	283	
Nuevo Ixcatlán	Veracruz	283	
Playa Vicente	Veracruz	283	
Rodríguez Clara	Veracruz	283	
Tesechoacán	Veracruz	283	
Villa Azueta	Veracruz	283	
Ángel R. Cabada (municipality)	Veracruz	284	
El Porvenir	Veracruz	284	
Lerdo de Tejada	Veracruz	284	
San Juan de los Reyes	Veracruz	284	
Tecolapan	Veracruz	284	
Tula	Veracruz	284	
El Cocuite	Veracruz	285	
El Hatito	Veracruz	285	
Ignacio de la Llave	Veracruz	285	
Jamapa	Veracruz	285	
La Laguna y Monte del Castillo	Veracruz	285	
Los Robles	Veracruz	285	
Manlio Fabio Altamirano	Veracruz	285	
Mata Loma	Veracruz	285	
Medellín de Bravo	Veracruz	285	
Paso de Ovejas	Veracruz	285	
Piedras Negras	Veracruz	285	
Playa de Vacas	Veracruz	285	
Puente Jula	Veracruz	285	
Soledad de Doblado	Veracruz	285	
Tenenexpan	Veracruz	285	
Tlalixcoyan	Veracruz	285	
Tolome	Veracruz	285	
Zacate Colorado Primero	Veracruz	285	
Benemérito Juárez (Palo Gacho)	Oaxaca	287	
Camelia Roja	Oaxaca	287	
El Edén	Oaxaca	287	
Papaloapam	Oaxaca	287	
San Felipe Jalapa de Díaz	Oaxaca	287	
San José Chiltepec	Oaxaca	287	
San Juan Bautista de Matamoros	Oaxaca	287	
San Lucas Ojitlán	Oaxaca	287	
San Pedro Ixtacatlán	Oaxaca	287	
Tuxtepec	Oaxaca	287	
Otatitlán	Veracruz	287	
Acula	Veracruz	288	
Amartillán	Veracruz	288	
Carlos A. Carrillo (San Cristóbal)	Veracruz	288	
Cosamaloapan	Veracruz	288	
Chacaltianguis	Veracruz	288	
Ixmatlahuacan	Veracruz	288	
La Granja	Veracruz	288	
Moyota	Veracruz	288	
Nopaltepec	Veracruz	288	
Paraíso Novillero	Veracruz	288	
San Francisco (Oyozontle)	Veracruz	288	
Tlacojalpan	Veracruz	288	
Tlacotalpan	Veracruz	288	
Tres Valles	Veracruz	288	
Tuxtilla	Veracruz	288	
Catemaco	Veracruz	294	
Comoapan	Veracruz	294	
Corral Nuevo	Veracruz	294	
Cuatotolapan Estación	Veracruz	294	
El Laurel	Veracruz	294	
Francisco I. Madero	Veracruz	294	
Juan Díaz Covarrubias	Veracruz	294	
Juan Jacobo Torres (Bodega de Totontepec)	Veracruz	294	
La Nueva Victoria	Veracruz	294	
La Victoria	Veracruz	294	
Mazumiapan	Veracruz	294	
Salto de Eyipantla	Veracruz	294	
San Andrés Tuxtla	Veracruz	294	
Santiago Tuxtla	Veracruz	294	
Sihuapan	Veracruz	294	
Sontecomapan	Veracruz	294	
Tapalapan	Veracruz	294	
Tilapan	Veracruz	294	
Tres Zapotes	Veracruz	294	
Tulapan	Veracruz	294	
Chichicaxtle	Veracruz	296	
El Farallón (Campamento CFE)	Veracruz	296	
El Palmar	Veracruz	296	
El Viejon Nuevo	Veracruz	296	
José Cardel	Veracruz	296	
La Antigua	Veracruz	296	
Mozomboa	Veracruz	296	
Nicolás Blanco (San Pancho)	Veracruz	296	
Palma Sola	Veracruz	296	
Paso de Doña Juana	Veracruz	296	
Paso del Cedro	Veracruz	296	
Santa Rosa, Veracruz (General Pinzón)	Veracruz	296	
Ursulo Galván	Veracruz	296	
Zempoala	Veracruz	296	
Alvarado	Veracruz	297	
Anton Lizardo	Veracruz	297	
Arbolillo	Veracruz	297	
Mandinga y Matoza	Veracruz	297	
Salinas	Veracruz	297	
