= 3rd federal electoral district of Puebla =

Federal electoral district of Mexico

Puebla's 3rd
- Electoral district of the Chamber of Deputies of Mexico

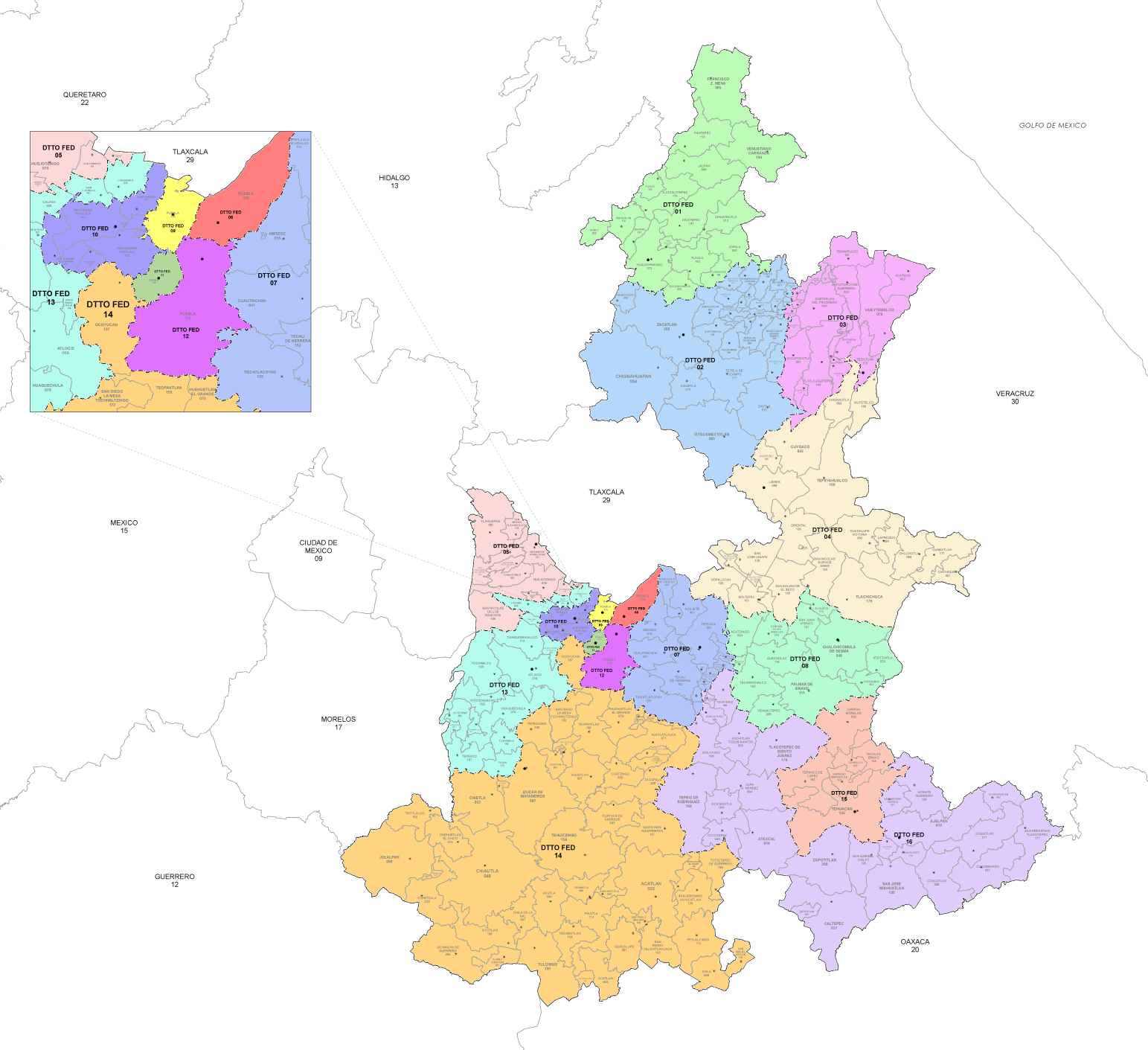
- 3rd district since 2023

Incumbent
- Member: Marilyn Ballesteros García
- Party: ▌Morena
- Congress: 66th (2024–2027)

District
- State: Puebla
- Head town: Teziutlán
- Coordinates: 19°49′N 97°22′W
- Covers: 17 municipalities: Acateno, Atempan, Ayotoxco de Guerrero, Cuetzalan del Progreso, Hueyapan, Hueytamalco, Jonotla, Nauzontla, Tenampulco, Teteles de Ávila Castillo, Teziutlán, Tlatlauquitepec, Tuzamapan de Galeana, Yaonahuac, Zacapoaxtla, Zaragoza, Zoquiapan
- PR region: Fourth
- Precincts: 199
- Population: 406,801 (2020 census)
- Indigenous: Yes (57%)

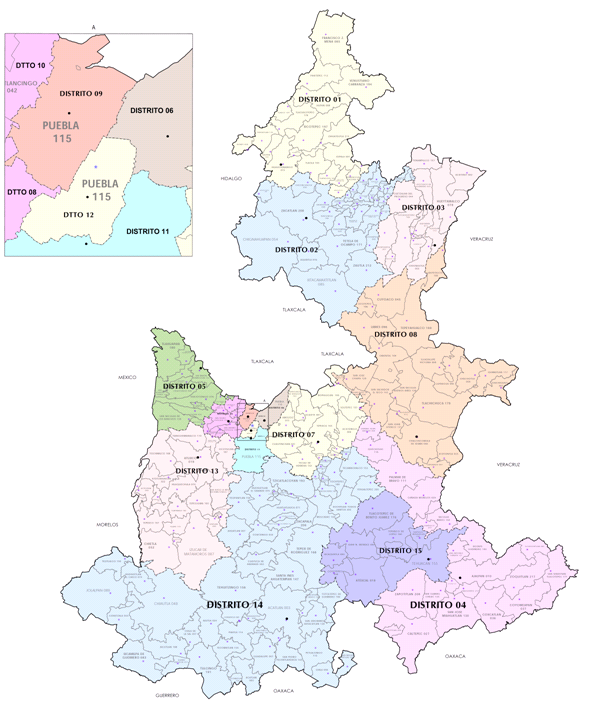
Puebla's districts in 2017–2022

The 3rd federal electoral district of Puebla (Spanish: Distrito electoral federal 03 de Puebla) is one of the 300 electoral districts into which Mexico is divided for elections to the federal Chamber of Deputies and one of 16 such districts in the state of Puebla.

It elects one deputy to the lower house of Congress for each three-year legislative session by means of the first-past-the-post system. Votes cast in the district also count towards the calculation of proportional representation ("plurinominal") deputies elected from the fourth region.

The current member for the district, elected in the 2024 general election, is María de los Ángeles "Marilyn" Ballesteros García of the National Regeneration Movement (Morena).

== District territory ==
Under the 2023 districting plan adopted by the National Electoral Institute (INE), which is to be used for the 2024, 2027 and 2030 federal elections, Puebla's congressional seat allocation rose from 15 to 16. The 3rd district is in the Sierra Norte region in the extreme north of the state and covers 199 electoral precincts (secciones electorales) across 17 of the state's municipalities:

- Acateno, Atempan, Ayotoxco de Guerrero, Cuetzalan del Progreso, Hueyapan, Hueytamalco, Jonotla, Nauzontla, Tenampulco, Teteles de Ávila Castillo, Teziutlán, Tlatlauquitepec, Tuzamapan de Galeana, Yaonahuac, Zacapoaxtla, Zaragoza and Zoquiapan.

The head town (cabecera distrital), where results from individual polling stations are gathered together and tallied, is the city of Teziutlán. The district reported a population of 406,801 in the 2020 census and, with Indigenous and Afrodescendent inhabitants accounting for over 57% of that total, it is classified by the INE as an indigenous district. (Note: Total inhabitants, not voters. The INE deems any local or federal electoral district where Indigenous or Afrodescendent inhabitants number 40% or more of the population to be an indigenous district.)

== Previous districting schemes ==
Evolution of electoral district numbers
	1974	1978	1996	2005	2017	2023
Puebla	10	14	15	16	15	16
Chamber of Deputies	196	300				

2017–2022

From 2017 to 2022, when Puebla was assigned 15 congressional seats, the district's head town was at Teziutlán and it covered 14 municipalities.

2005–2017

Under the 2005 plan, the district was one of 16 in Puebla. Its head town was at Teziutlán and it covered 14 municipalities.

1996–2005

Between 1996 and 2005, Puebla had 15 districts. The 3rd covered 16 municipalities, with its head town at Teziutlán.

1978–1996

The districting scheme in force from 1978 to 1996 was the result of the 1977 electoral reforms, which increased the number of single-member seats in the Chamber of Deputies from 196 to 300. Under that plan, Puebla's seat allocation rose from 10 to 14. The district's head town was at San Pedro Cholula and it covered 13 municipalities.

== Deputies returned to Congress ==
(Mexico) National parties
- Current
- PAN
- PRI
- PT
- PVEM
- MC
- Morena
- PAZ
- Somos
- Defunct or local only
- PLM
- PNR
- PRM
- PNM
- PP
- PPS
- PARM
- PFCRN
- CON
- PANAL
- PSD
- PES
- PES
- PRD

Puebla's 3rd district
Election	Deputy	Party	Term	Legislature
1916	Miguel Rosales		1916–1917	Constituent Congress of Querétaro
...
1979	Melitón Morales Sánchez	Institutional Revolutionary Party	1979–1982	51st Congress
1982	Efrain Trujeque Martínez	Institutional Revolutionary Party	1982–1985	52nd Congress
1985	Guadalupe López Bretón	Institutional Revolutionary Party	1985–1988	53rd Congress
1988	César Alfonso Neri Ávila	Institutional Revolutionary Party	1988–1991	54th Congress
1991	Julieta Mendívil Blanco	Institutional Revolutionary Party	1991–1994	55th Congress
1994	Adrián Víctor Hugo Islas Hernández	Institutional Revolutionary Party	1994–1997	56th Congress
1997	José Luis Flores Hernández	Institutional Revolutionary Party	1997–2000	57th Congress
2000	Concepción González Molina	Institutional Revolutionary Party	2000–2003	58th Congress
2003	José Luis Flores Hernández	Institutional Revolutionary Party	2003–2006	59th Congress
2006	José Guillermo Fuentes Ortiz	National Action Party (Mexico)	2006–2009	60th Congress
2009	Jorge Alberto Juraidini Rumilla	Institutional Revolutionary Party	2009–2012	61st Congress
2012	Víctor Emanuel Díaz Palacios	Institutional Revolutionary Party	2012–2015	62nd Congress
2015	Juan Pablo Piña Kurczyn	National Action Party (Mexico)	2015–2018	63rd Congress
2018	Claudia Báez Ruiz	Social Encounter Party	2018–2021	64th Congress
2021	Esther Martínez Romano	Labour Party (Mexico)	2021–2024	65th Congress
2024	María de los Ángeles Ballesteros García	National Regeneration Movement	2024–2027	66th Congress

== Presidential elections ==
Puebla's 3rd district
Election	District won by	Party or coalition	%
2018	Andrés Manuel López Obrador	Juntos Haremos Historia	50.7815
2024	Claudia Sheinbaum Pardo	Sigamos Haciendo Historia	69.3616
