= Sierra Norte de Puebla =

Mountainous region in Puebla, Mexico

Coordinates: 20°1′48″N 97°52′18″W

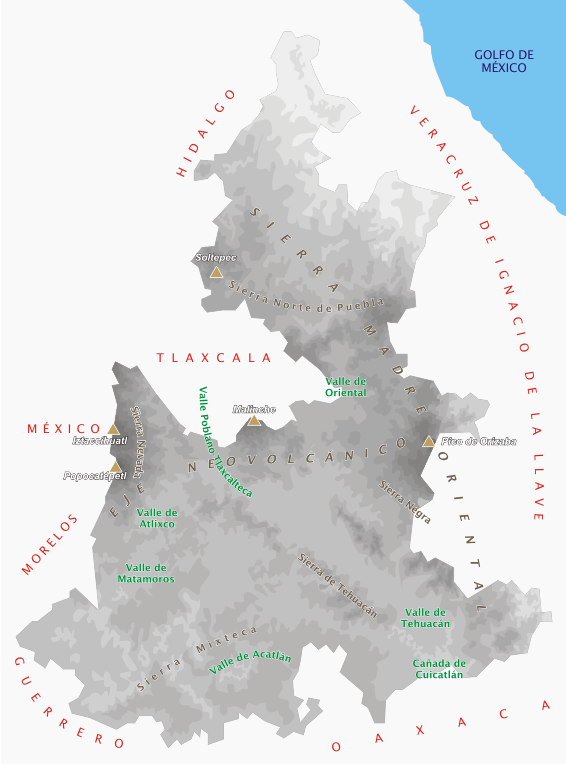
Relief map of Puebla

The Sierra Norte de Puebla is a rugged mountainous region accounting for the northern third of the state of Puebla, Mexico. It is at the intersection of the Trans-Mexican Volcanic Belt and the Sierra Madre Oriental, between the Mexican Plateau and the Gulf of Mexico coast. From the Mesoamerican period to the 19th century, this area was part of a larger region called Totonacapan, and area dominated by the Totonac people, extending further east to the Gulf of Mexico. Political maneuvers to weaken the Totonacs led to the region being divided between the modern states of Puebla and Veracruz with the Puebla section given its current name. Until the 19th century, the area was almost exclusively indigenous, with the four main groups still found here today, Totonacs, Nahuas, Otomis and Tepehuas, but coffee cultivation brought in mestizos (mixed indigenous/European people) and some European immigrants who took over political and economic power. While highly marginalized socioeconomically, the area has been developed heavily since the mid 20th century, especially with the building of roadways linking it to the Mexico City area and the Gulf coast.

== Geography ==
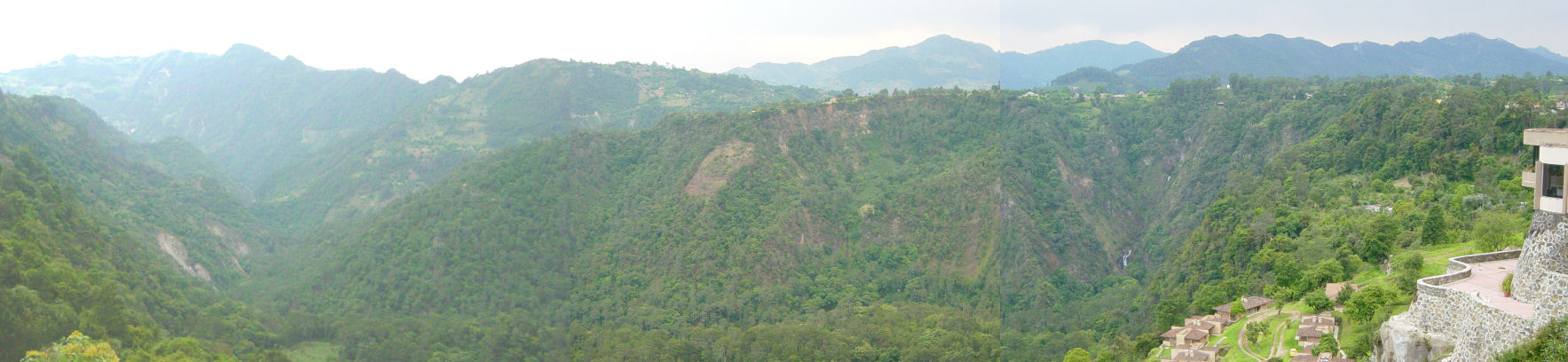
Barranca de los Jilgueros, in the Sierra Norte de Puebla, near Zacatlán, Puebla.

The region consists of sixty eight municipalities, most of which are considered rural, located at the far north of the state of Puebla, north and east of where the state of Tlaxcala cuts into Puebla. Most of the Sierra Norte corresponds with the Puebla subregion of the Carso Huasteco, which covers an area of 448,927 hectares or thirteen percent of the state.

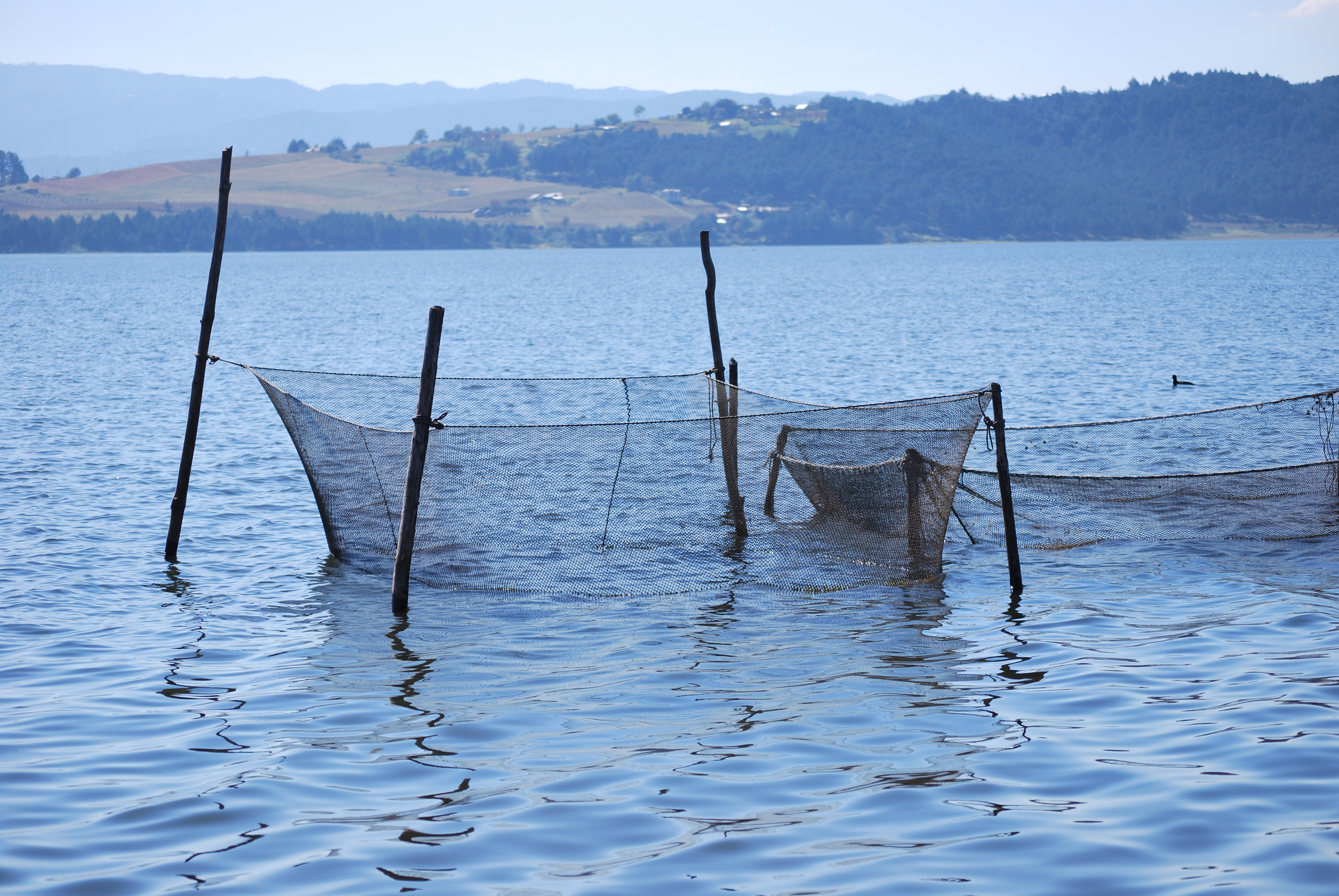
Tejocotal Dam

The area is at the intersection of the Sierra Madre Oriental and the Trans-Mexican Volcanic Belt. These mountains extend eastward into the state of Veracruz until the narrow Gulf of Mexico coastal plain. The areas rocks is mostly sedimentary with some volcanic, but all have been altered by tectonic processes caused by the moving earth and forming the mountains here. The area is very rugged with few narrow valleys with about 60% of the territory made up of steep slopes. Altitudes range from 100 to 2,300 meters above sea level. The area is filled with caves and caverns, many of which are little explored. The area's mountains are divided into the Sierra de Zacapoaxtla, Sierra de Huauchinango, Sierra Teziutlán, Sierra de Tetela de Ocampo, Sierra de Chignahuapan and Sierra de Zacatlán. The highest altitudes are over 4,200 meters above sea level. Main elevations include Apulco, Chichat, Chignahuapan, Soltepec and Tlatlauquitepec.

The Sierra Norte de Puebla is susceptible to landslides due to its many steep inclines and heavy rain. The town of Pahuatlán is over an ancient landslide. The relative prosperity of the 20th century has spurred development of large towns with cement block structure, significantly heavier than traditional homes. This has made a number of areas, such as Pahuatlán, more vulnerable to landslides as they are located on mountainsides. Deforestation and road construction have also increased the risk. Major landslides have occurred in 1955, 1989, 1995, 1999, 2001, 2005, and 2007. The last was due to two hurricanes (Dean and Lorenzo) and isolated a number of communities for days.

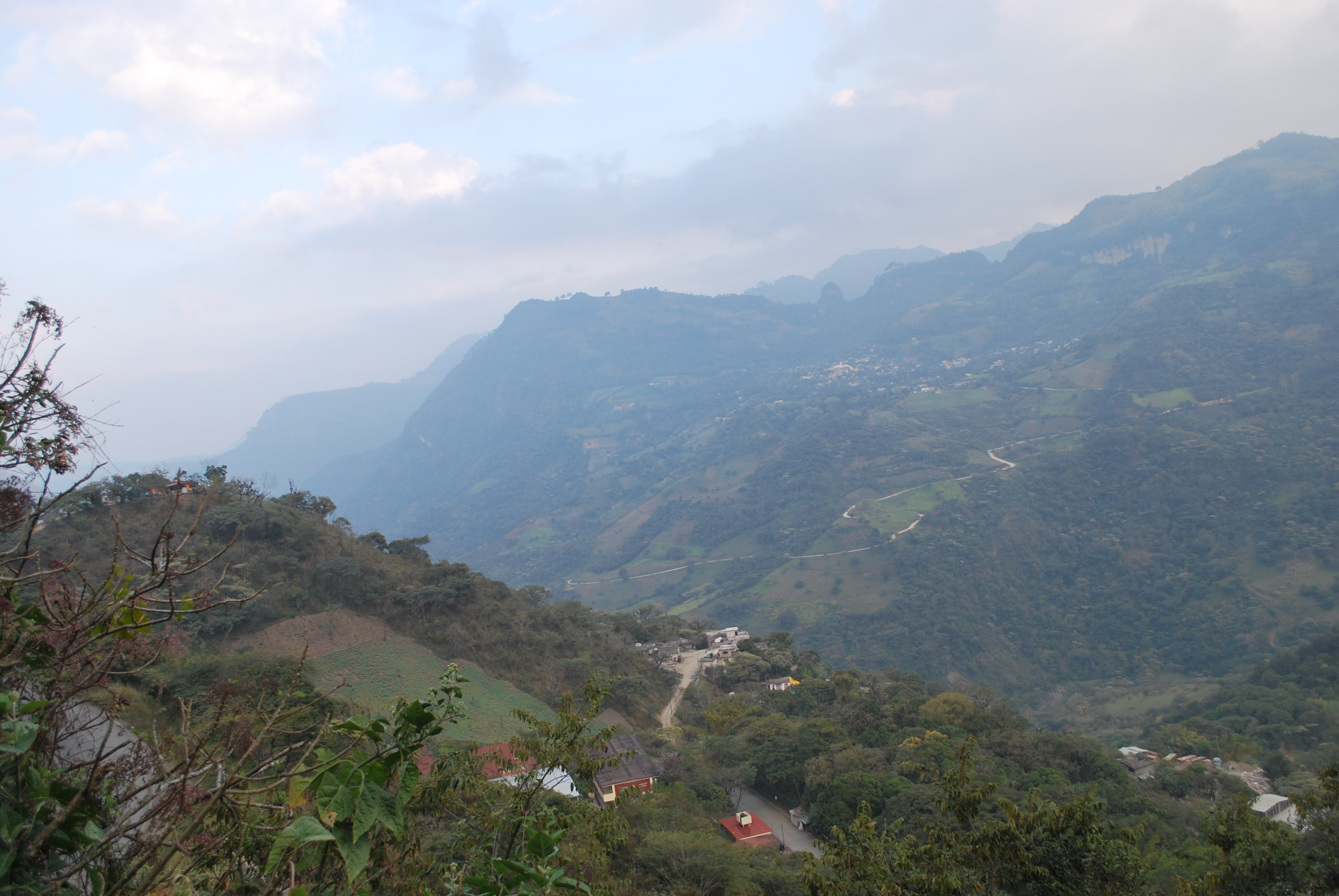
Pahuatlán Valley

The Sierra Norte is the rainiest part of Puebla with average rainfall in most places between 1500 and 3,000mm, with Cuetzalan having the highest precipitation zone at between 4,000 and 6,000mm. Most of the surface water is in fast moving streams and small rivers, some of which run only in the rainy season and many of which can be torrential when rains are heavy. The three most important rivers are the Necaxa and Apulco. Other important rivers include the Pantepec, Laxaxalpan, San Pedro (Zun), Zempoala, Cedro Viego, Salteros and Martínez de la Torre. All of these flow towards the Gulf of Mexico, in the drainage basins of the Nautla, Tecolutla, Cazones and Tuxpan Rivers. As it is one of the rainiest areas of Mexico, the water flow here is high, measuring about 6,697mm2, accounting for sixty percent of new runoff for Puebla with about 2/3 flowing into Veracruz. The main aquifer is the Tecolutla, which has 70% of the underground fresh water in the area, followed by the Libres-Oriental, Martínez de la Torre-Nautla and Perote-Zayaleta.

The region has great biological diversity because of the wide variance in altitude. Wild vegetation can be classed as evergreen tropical forest (the Veracruz moist forests ecoregion), mountain mesophyll or cloud forest (the Veracruz montane forests ecoregion north of the Tecolutla River, and Oaxacan montane forests south of the river) and pine–oak and pine forest (the Trans-Mexican Volcanic Belt pine–oak forests ecoregion) with large areas of transition from one to another. The ecosystem of the region is highly disturbed with urban areas along with farms, areas of secondary vegetation as well as areas with primary vegetation.

The Sierra Norte is divided into four subregions, according to its ecology and agriculture. The area nearest the highlands of Puebla and Tlaxcala in the south is called the Bocasierra. This strip of land has elevations between 1,500 and 2,500 meters above sea level, with a primarily temperate and cold climate. Main crops are apples, plums, pears, peaches, avocados and certain flowers and ornamental plants. It is economically and politically the most important area of the Sierra Norte and includes municipalities such as Huauchinango, Zacatlán, Chignahuapan, Tetela de Ocampo, Zacapoaxtla, Zaragoza and Teziutlán. The coffee-growing region has elevations between 200 and 1,500 meters above sea levels with a very humid, temperate-warm climate, which is optimal for coffee and black pepper. This area includes the municipalities of Cuetzalan, Tuzamapan, Huehuetla, Xochitlán de Vicente Suárez, Zapotitlán de Méndez, Hueytlalpan, Ahuacatlán, Aquixtla, Zihuateutla, Pahuatlán and Naupan. The Zona Baja (low area) includes areas below 200 meters above sea level. It has a tropical climate with agriculture dedicated primarily to citrus fruits such as oranges, mandarin oranges, grapefruit, papaya and mamey. It is also noted for its cattle. It includes the municipalities of Francisco Z. Mena, Venustiano Carranza, Pantepec, Jalpan and Tenampulco. The Declive Austral (southern slope) de la Sierra is an arid area as the winds from the Gulf of Mexico that brings in moisture do not get this far as often. This area has large haciendas which use high technology irrigation systems for crops such as barley and wheat. It is also noted for the raising of horses. It includes the municipalities of Ixtacamaxtitlán, Cuyoaco, Tepeyahualco, Libres and Ocotepec.

While much of the agriculture and other economic activities are adapted to the various ecologies of the region; however, overexploitation has severely damaged many of these systems and in turn, the economic support of many indigenous communities. Much of the original forest has been cut for pasture and for cultivation as well as for wood. Deforestation has led to greater danger from landslides.

== Climate ==
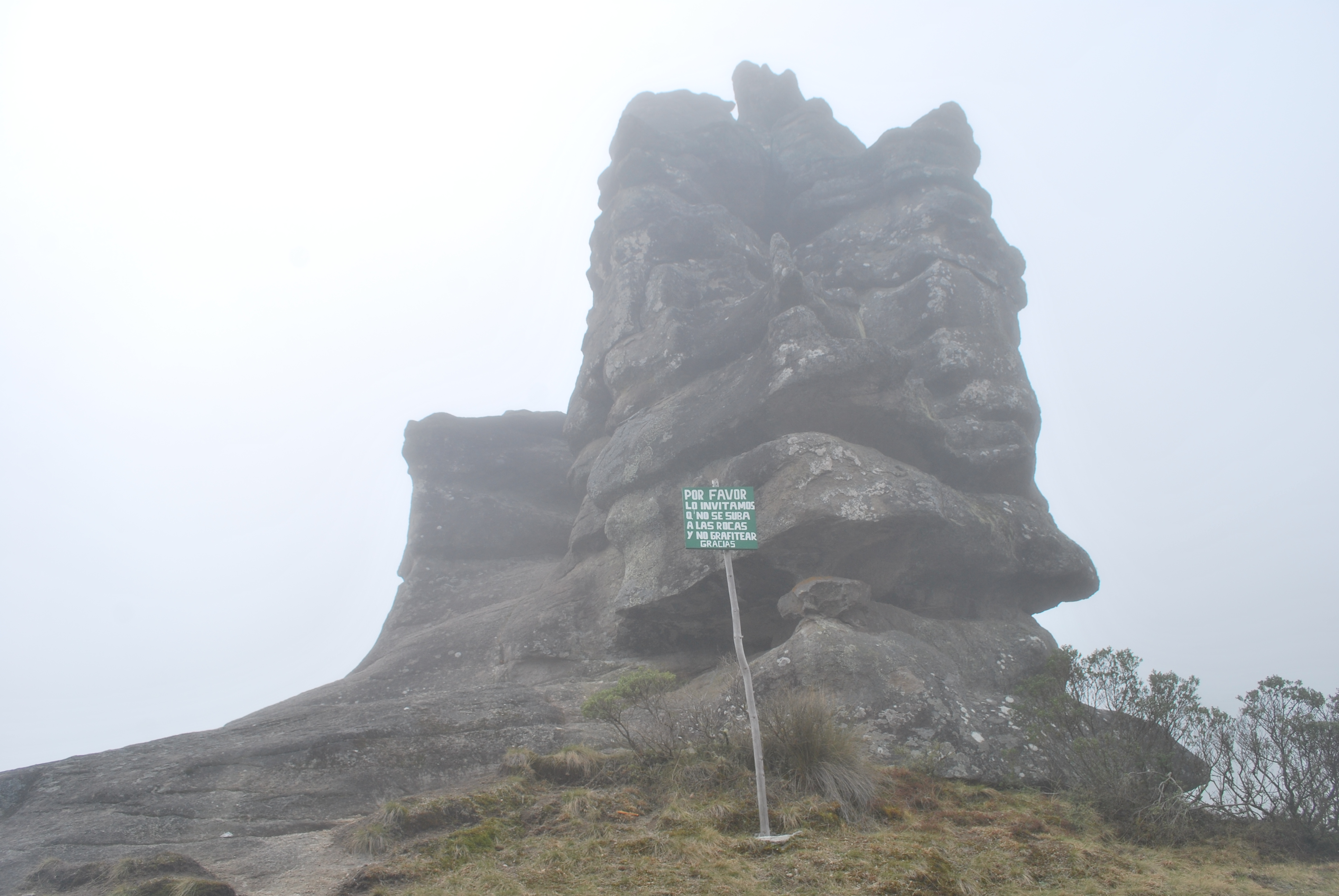
Fog at the Piedras Encimadas Valley in Zacatlán

The Sierra Norte is one of the rainiest regions in Mexico, with an average of 500 and 800 mm each month on average. The high amount of rainfall, especially on the ocean facing slopes in the north makes landslides more commons as soils saturate. Hurricanes can occur between June and November, at the end of the rainy season. These storms can be catastrophic with the amount of rain causing flash flooding and saturated soils resulting in landslides. Precipitation is lowest in winter because of wind patterns called "nortes." These are polar air masses that collide with the warm waters of the Gulf as they move south. For this region, this usually results in high wind and light rainfall.

The climate of the region is divided into six subtypes. Hot and humid - Am(f) is characterized by abundant rain in the summer with an average annual temperature of between 22 and 24 °C. Precipitation totals vary between 1,200 and 2,500 mm. This climate is found in the very north, along the border with Veracruz in the municipalities of Acatenco, Tenampulco, Hueytamalco and Ayotoxco de Guerrero.

Hot and humid – Af(m) is characterized by rains year round with an average annual temperature of between 22 and 26 °C and annual precipitation of between 1,500 in the lower elevation to over 3,000 in the highest. This climate is found in the municipalities of Ayotoxco de Guerrero, Tuzamapan de Galeana, Cuetzalan del Progresso and parts of Acateno, Yahonáhuac, Teziutlán and Hueyapan.

Semi hot with rain year round – AC(fm) is characterized by an average annual temperature of between 18 and 24 °C with precipitation levels varying between 1,200 and 4,500 mm per year. This is found along a strip in the municipalities of Tlaxco and Hueytamalco at an altitude of between 700 and 1,500 meters above sea level.

Temperate and humid – C(fm) is characterized by year round rain with an average annual temperature of less than 18 °C and precipitation varying from between 1,200 and 3,000. This is found in the municipalities of Atempan, Teziutlán, Hueyapan, Yahonáhuac, Tuzamapan de Galeana, Huehuetla, Cuetzalan, Xiutetelco, Chignautla y completamente cubren los municipios de Jonotla, Ixtepec, Hueytlalpan, Nauzontla, Atletlequizayan and Xochitlán de Vicente Suárez.

Temperate and humid with abundant rain in summer – C(m) is characterized by an average annual temperature of between 12 and 18C with an average annual rainfall of between 1,000 and 2,000mm, most of which falls in the summer. This is found primarily in the north east in the municipalities of Hueytamalco, Huehuetla, Ayotoxco de Guerrero and Cuetzalan.

Temperate and semi-humid with rain in summer – C(m2) is characterized as less humid than C(m) with average annual temperatures between 12 and 18 °C and precipitation between 400 and 800 mm. This is found in the municipalities of Chignautla, Zacapoaxtla and Xochiapulco.

== Demographics ==
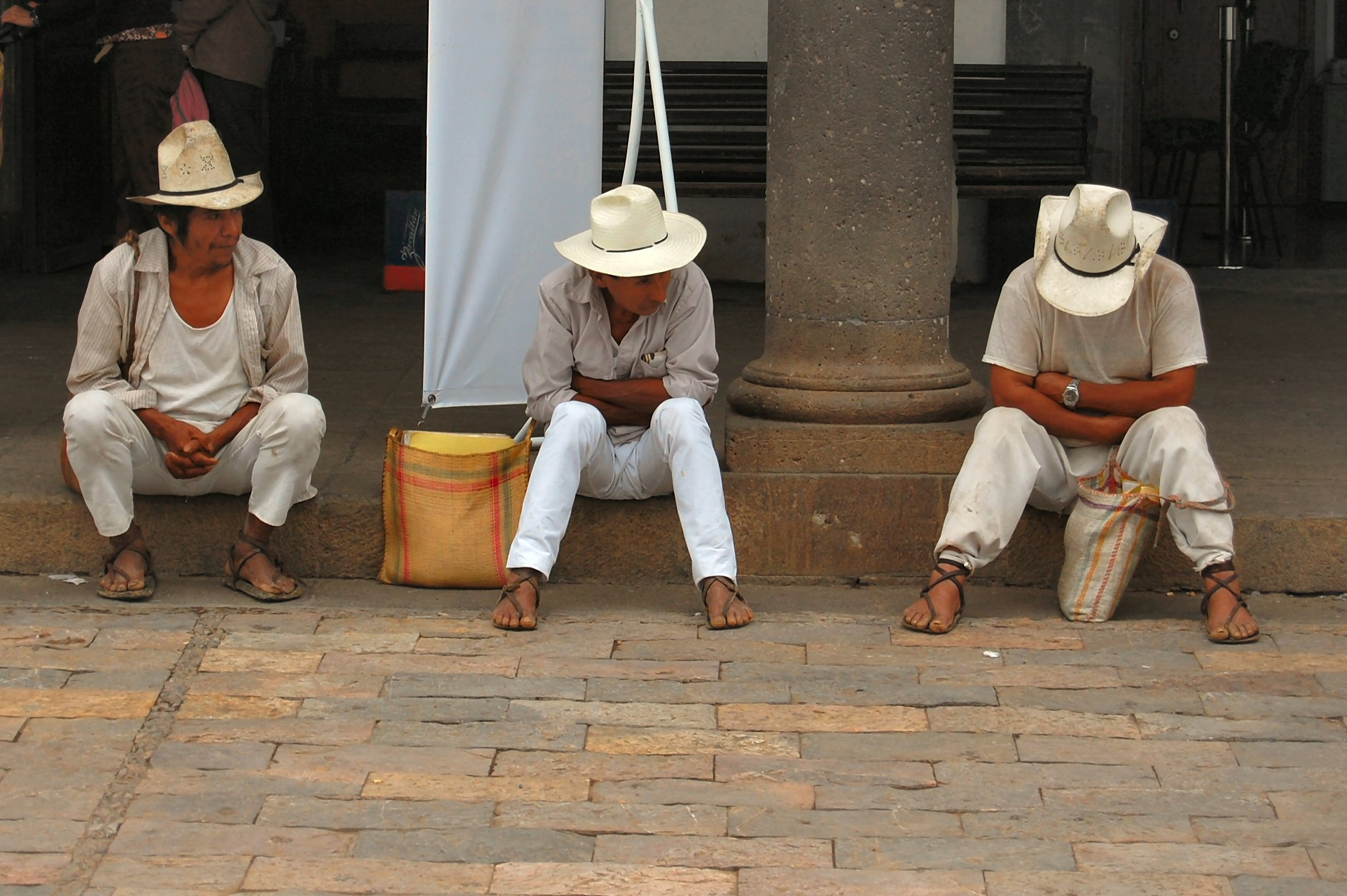
Nahua men in Zacatlán

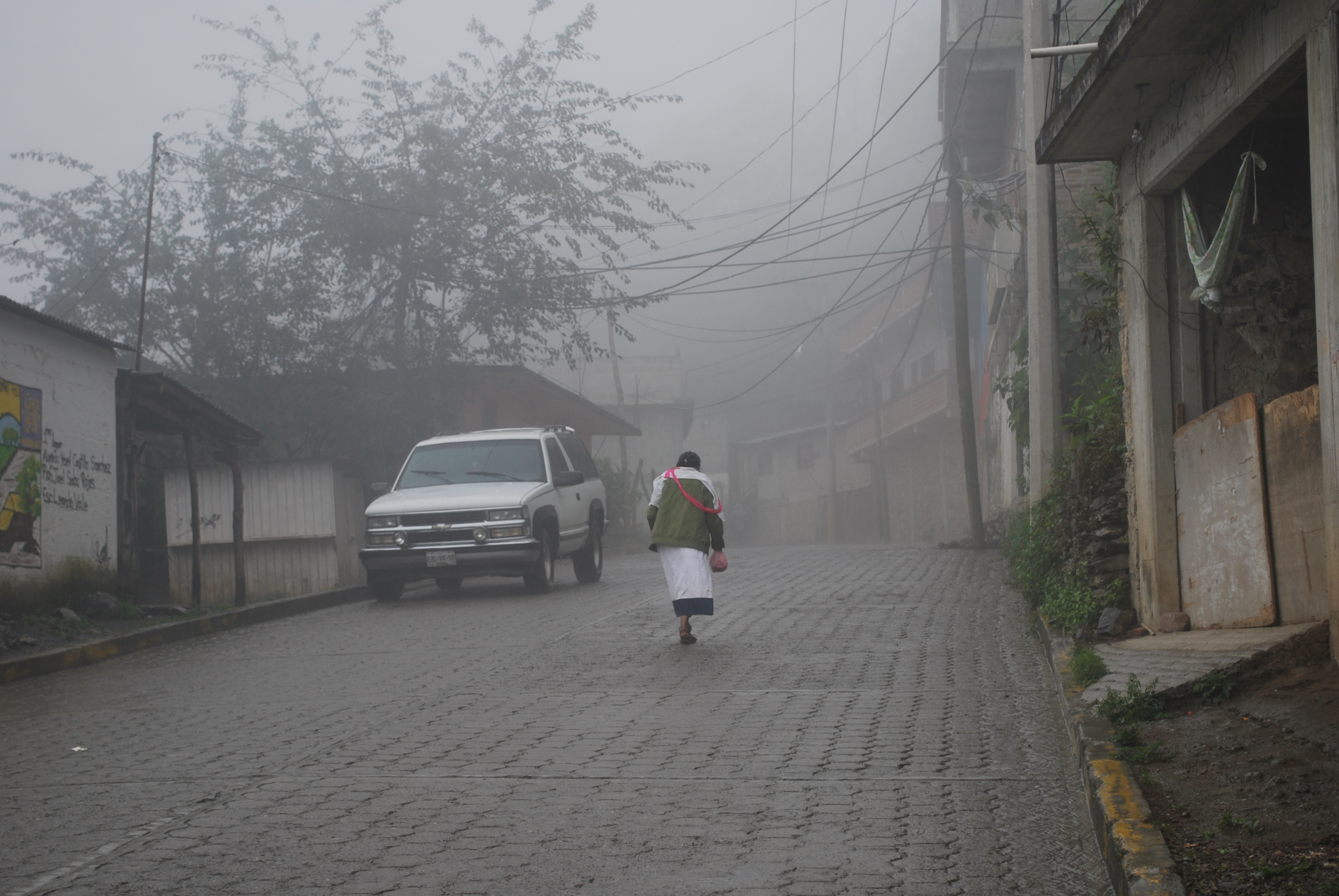
Otomi woman walking on the main street of Pahuatlán

The Sierra Norte is a predominantly rural region with a high percentage of indigenous population and an elevated level of socioeconomic marginalization, especially among the indigenous. Those in the region identify themselves as from the mountains (serranos) before identifying with the state of Puebla. Among serranos, there is a division between the various indigenous groups and "mestizos" or people of mixed European-indigenous ethnicity. Mestizos are strongly segregated from the indigenous and found mostly in the urban municipal seats, especially Zacatlán, Chignahuapan, Tetela de Ocampo, Zacapoaxtla, Cuetzalan, Teziutlán, Zaragoza, Zihuateutla and Tlatlauquitepec, with the indigenous in the more rural areas. Indigenous language and traditions are considered inferior or "not modern" by the mestizos and many indigenous because of the poverty associated with indigenous life. Social and economic organizations are best developed among the Nahuas and the Totonacs to promote the communities' interests. Most of these are Nahua and based in Cuetzalan. One of the first organizations of this kind was the Cooperativa Agropecuaria Regional Tosepan Titataniske (CARTT) in the 1970s, with the aim of improving the prospects of small agricultural producers.

The Sierra Norte is a multiethnic area, primarily with Totonacs, Nahuas, Otomis and Tepehua with some Huasteca influence. There are no Huastec communities but the very north is considered to overlap the extreme south of the La Huasteca region. The Comisión Nacional para el Desarrollo de los Pueblos Indígenas works in the areas with several centers in Huauchinango, Zacapoaxtla and Teziutlán as well as a radio station, XECTZ in Cuetzalan, called La Voz de la Sierra (The Voice of the Mountains) in Spanish and various indigenous languages. Indigenous beliefs and rituals have been more strongly maintained here than in other areas of Mexico because of its relative isolation. Until the middle of the 19th century, there were few to no non-Indians living in the region.

The area was originally considered part of Totonac territory, but in the pre Hispanic era, various migrations brought other indigenous groups with Nahuatl, Otomi and Tepehua still spoken here along with Totonac. For many, especially the Nahua, language is an important identifying marker. One binding force among indigenous groups is shared regional religious sites and festivals. For examples, east days in a Totonac community will also bring in Nahuas and other neighbors. Some saints, such as the Apostle Andrew, are important among various ethnicities as it is related to the blessing of seeds. Another important celebration is Day of the Dead, celebrated in all of Mexico. Another factor is the dependence on commerce, with participation in municipal and regional markets. The main market towns are Huauchinango, Zacatlán, Tetela de Ocampo, Zacapoaxtla, Cuetzalan, Zaragoza and Teziutlán. Some of these markets are weekly "tianguis" and some are permanent establishments. Most indigenous groups are socially linked by family lineage and language, with language especially important among the Nahuas.

The indigenous handcrafts tradition of the region goes back to the pre Hispanic period. After it was conquered by the Aztecs, a tribute item was cotton garments, which were highly prized. Today, it is mostly done as a complement to agricultural activities, with some exceptions, with most learning their skills in childhood. Communities tend to specialize in a certain handcrafts. Pottery is mostly made in the towns of Aquixtla, Tetela de Ocampo, Tenextatiloyan and Zacatlán. Textiles made with backstrap or more modern looms (and often embroidered) are more widespread. Most of this is related to women's garments such as the embroidered blouses, skirts and a poncho-like garment called as quezquémetl. Most garments vary in design depending on origin and some communities make garments for sale, but in different colors and designs then those made for home use. The use of traditional garments by men has diminished significantly with its use mostly confined to elders. Traditional men's dress consists of a shirt and pants of undyed cotton, with a wrap belt, a pouch bag, a palm hat, huaraches and a machete.

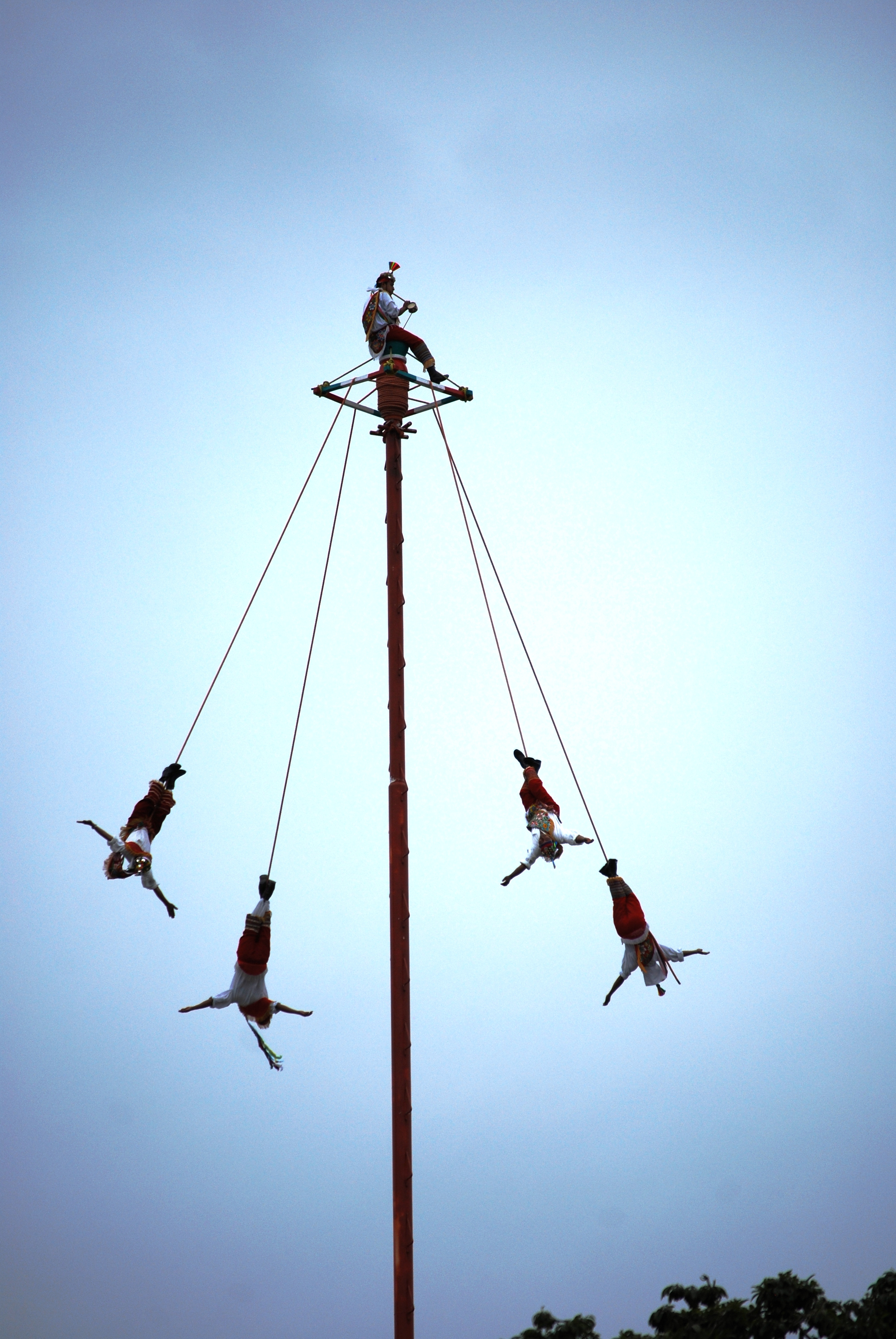
Performance of the Voladores

The Danza de los Voladores (Dance of the Flyers) is an ancient Mesoamerican ceremony/ritual still performed today in the Sierra Norte. The ritual consists of dance and the climbing of a 30-meter pole from which four of the five participants then launch themselves tied with ropes to descend to the ground. The fifth remains on top of the pole, dancing and playing a flute and drum. According to one myth, the ritual was created to ask the gods to end a severe drought. The ceremony was named an Intangible Cultural Heritage by UNESCO in order to help the ritual survive and thrive in the modern world. According to Totonac myth, its origin was to appease the gods during a drought. The exact origin of this ritual/dance is unknown, but it is thought to have originated with the Huastec, Nahua and Otomi peoples in Sierra del Puebla and mountain areas of Veracruz. The ritual spread through much of the Mesoamerican world until it was practiced from northern Mexico to Nicaragua. The ritual was partially lost after the Conquest, and the Spaniards destroyed many records about it. In modern times, a number of changes have occurred. Due to the deforestation of much of the Sierra de Puebla and mountain areas of Veracruz, most voladores perform on permanent metal poles. The most controversial change has been the induction of women to perform the ceremony. Traditionally, it has been taboo to allow women to become voladores but a few have become such, all of whom are in Puebla state, primarily in Pahuatlán and Cuetzalán. The Ritual Ceremony of the Voladores of Papantla was recognized as Intangible Cultural Heritage (ICH) by UNESCO in 2009. The ritual was inscribed along with the Traditions of the Otomi-Chichimecas of Toliman, Peña de Bernal, Querétaro. Various other communities in the Sierra Norte regularly perform the Voladores dance or ritual including Chila Honey, Huauchinango and Tenango de Flores.

Today, Puebla has the largest number of Nahuas in Mexico, most of which live in the Sierra Norte. The Nahuas of the Sierra Norte call themselves Macelhuamej, which means "true Mexican." There are about 218,000 Nahuas in the region found in nearly all parts. In some areas, they dominate; in others, they share the territories with one or more of the other indigenous groups. The presence of Nahuas in the region is the result of a number of migrations at different times in the Mesoamerican period. The most commonly accepted theory states that there were two main migrations into the area. The first was that of the Olmeca-Xicalancas from the south and another of the Toltecs from the central highlands of Mexico. There are two main dialects of Nahuatl spoken in the Sierra Norte but it is not known if they are the result of the two migrations. There have been efforts to preserve language and other traditions. One of these is the Taller de Tradición Oral de la Sociedad Agropecuario del Centro de Estudios y Promoción Educativa para el Campo (CEPEC) in San Miguel Tzinacapan, Cuetzalan. This organization had young Nahuas compile myths and other stories from the elders in their community, which were compiled into a book.

The Sierra Norte de Puebla was once part of a larger indigenous region called Totonacapan, which extended from here east to the Gulf of Mexico coast in northern Veracruz. Main Totonac archeological sites are El Tajín and Cempoala in Veracruz and Yohualichan near Cuetzalan. However, the Aztecs invaded Totonac lands, pushing much of the ethnicity eastward into Veracruz. Because of this, and tribute payments, the Totonacs were the first to ally with the Spanish when they arrived. After the Conquest, the Spanish initially respected Totonac political authority, but starting in the 17th century, they began to replace the authority of chiefs with "Indian councils." Disease also took a toll on the Totonac people and today, the ethnicity occupies half the territory it did when the Spanish arrived. Relations between the Totonac and the mestizo/Spanish population further declined starting in the second half of the 18th century as the latter groups began taking over lands traditionally held by the Totonacs. There were a series of revolts 1750 to 1820 but they were put down. The Totonacs were early to ally with the Independence movement under leader Serafin Olarte, but he was soon executed by royalist troops. After Independence, another revolt was headed by Mariano Olarte, son of Serafin from 1836 to 1838. This one was sparked by the banning of traditional Totonac Holy Week celebration by the Puebla bishop, who deemed it too "pagan." The 20th century to the present has seen a further drop in the Totonac population along with the loss of the Totonac language as speakers switch to Spanish and sometimes even to Nahuatl. Totonac, of the Totonacan (a.k.a. Totonac-Tepehua) family), is spoken in both the Sierra Norte de Puebla and northern Veracruz although not all dialects are mutually intelligible. In a number of indigenous communities such as the Totonac speakers in Chicontla and Patla, parents encourage their children to be monolingual in Spanish only. This is mostly because Spanish is seen as necessary for their economic future and the speaking of Totonac might hold them back. Struggles between Totonacs and mestizos over land have continued to the present day, but the Totonac gained ground only for a while during the Mexican Revolution.

The Sierra Norte Otomi are one of two main groups of Otomi found in Mexico, with the other in the Mezquital Valley in Hidalgo. The Otomi are likely originally from the Toluca Valley, but were pushed north and east by Nahuatl speakers sometime before the 12th century, with the Sierra Norte Otomis cut off culturally from the rest sometime between then and the rise of the Aztec Empire. These Otomis live in some of the steepest terrain with some of the highest rainfall in the Sierra Norte. They live in small villages of between 500 and 1500 people, which are generally dominated by mestizo municipal governments. Villages have their own councils. In the past, positions of influence were gained by force or money but more often today, elders are elected. However, age remains a main factor of social authority. Most Otomis are subsistence farmers with small plots of between one and three hectares per family. Social relations are based on kinship. Traditional houses measure about 5×9 meters with two rooms, a dormitory and a kitchen, but these are beginning to be replaced by more modern structures. The Otomis have retained much of their indigenous beliefs, primarily due to their geographical isolation. While officially Catholic, shamans are still important figures and religious rituals centering on various deities related to nature, farming etc. are still important.

The Tepehuas are a little-known indigenous group in Mexico. Tepehuas can be found in parts of Hidalgo and Veracruz as well as in the Sierra Norte, where they are principally found in the municipality of Pantepec. Their language is related to Totonac, and forms the second branch of the Totonacan (Totonac-Tepehua) languages family. Most subsist on agriculture of basic foodstuffs, living in very rural areas. Cash is earned by selling parts of harvests, cash crops such as coffee and oranges and through handcrafts. However, poverty is a major problem in the community and many have migrated to other parts of Mexico and to the United States for work. Like other Sierra Norte ethnicities, the Tepehua have maintain a significant amount of their religious heritage but the language is in danger of disappearing.

== History ==
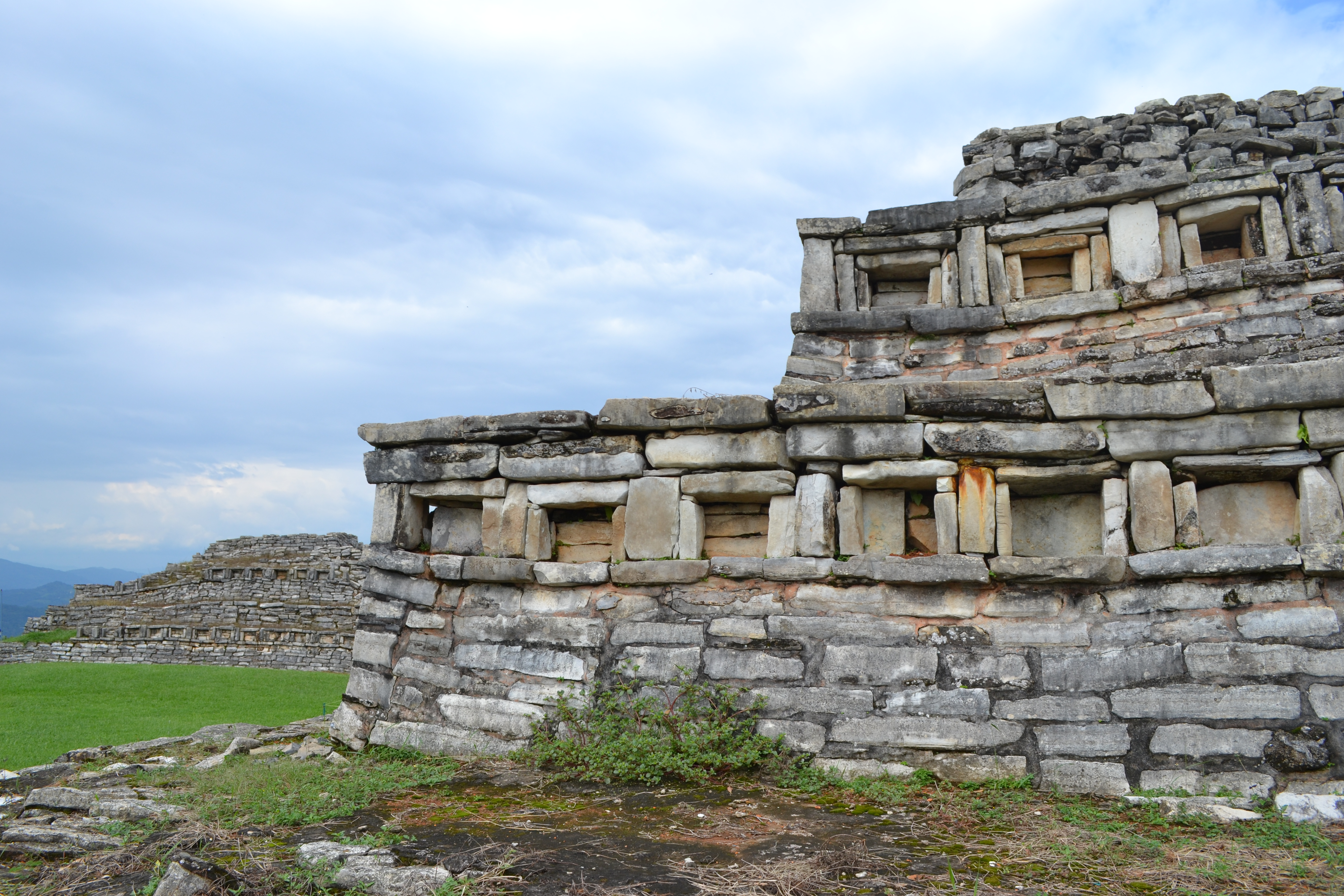
Yohualichan, the main Totonac archeological site in the Sierra Norte

The first known culture based in this area was that of the Totonacs, who have occupied the area in northern Veracruz and the Sierra Norte de Puebla possibly since the 7th century, with major urban centers in El Tajín, Cempoala, and Yohualichan reaching their heights between 600 and 900 CE. However, there was also considerable influence here from Teotihuacan when it was at the height of its power as well.

The Sierra Norte was important for its trade routes in the pre-Hispanic period as it connected the Mexican Plateau with the Gulf coast. This location also attracted migrations of people, most notably the Nahuas and the Otomi. The first Nahuatl-speaking people in the area were the Toltecs in the 7th century, gaining control of much of the Sierra Norte area by 919. Another Nahuatl group were the Olmeca-Xicalancas who came into the area from the south. There are two main dialects of Nahuatl spoken in the Sierra Norte but it is not known if they are the result of the two migrations. By the 11th century, most of the Nahuatl names that now dominate the area became established. The Otomis were pushed north and east of their probably original home in the Toluca Valley by Nahuas with the Sierra Otomi found in the far north of the region. By the 15th century, the Totonacs were weak and the Aztecs took over the area, pushing much of the population east and out of the Sierra Norte. It became a tribute province of Texcoco.

When the Spanish arrived in the early 16th century, the Totonacs allied with them to defeat the Aztecs. Evangelization began in 1535 first by the Franciscans and then by the Augustinians, but it was slow. In the early colonial period, the Spanish set up encomiendas in the area to control tribute collection, but the rough terrain and lack of mineral wealth kept the Spanish from imposing serious control. For the rest of the colonial period, the Sierra Norte would be almost completely populated by the same indigenous groups, Nahuas, Totonacs, Otomis and Tepehuas, living in the same overlapping territories for centuries.

The Sierra Norte's isolation remained so until the middle of the 19th century, when cash crops, especially coffee, and transport for them began to be introduced. The railway came to the Sierra Norte from Tulancingo, Hidalgo in the latter 19th century which allowed the shipping of tropical products such as coffee, sugar cane and fruit to Mexico City profitable. The profits to be made then not only attracted Mexican mestizos into the area but also some European immigrants from Spain and Italy. These groups took over land from the indigenous groups. For example, in Cuetzalan, descendants of Spanish and Italian immigrants still hold most of the local political and economic power in the municipality. This changed the political landscape to a mostly mestizo elite living in the main towns and the indigenous as an underclass in the rural areas.

This situation and rebellion by the Totonacs led to the political division of the pre-Hispanic Totonacapan between the states of Puebla and Veracruz, with the Puebla section coming to be known as the Sierra Norte. There were various uprisings in all parts of Totonacapan which were all repressed. However, the most important was headed by Mariano Olarte from 1836 to 1838 when the bishop of Puebla banned traditional Totonac Holy Week ceremonies because they were considered too pagan. This rebellion was also put down but it sparked a series of political moves to weaken the Totonacs. These moves were most successful in the Sierra Norte because the area generally favored the prevalent Liberal policies of the latter 19th century and the multicultural character of the region put the Totonacs under more pressure to assimilate. The borders of northern Puebla fluctuated in the latter 19th century but were fixed to their current ones by the Mexican Revolution.

Most of the 20th century after the Revolution is marked by the integration of the territory and the introduction of modern conveniences and economy. The most important of these is the construction of highways into and through the region making it more accessible. Until the turn of the century, the only way to reach many communities was by air, foot or horse but today most are accessible by car, even if only by dirt road. The Mexico City-Tuxpan highway was constructed in the 1950s because of the petroleum production in northern Veracruz, cutting across the northern part of the region. The next major highway constructed here was in the 1970s, called the Interserrana, crossing the region east–west connecting the largest towns such as Teziutlán, Zacatlán and Ahuazotepec and connecting them to the Mexico City-Tuxpan highway. In the 1970s and early 1980s, highway construction was delayed due to disputes with indigenous communities. The construction of highways and other infrastructure in the area remains a priority for both federal and state governments.

Education levels during the 20th century increased greatly. Public schooling became widely available in the 1960s. Most municipalities now offer education to the middle school level with high schools located in many. The access to education has been a factor in many youth leaving the area for better opportunities. The building of highways not only has served to bring people into the area but also has allowed people to migrate out.

Another major infrastructure improvement was the introduction of electricity which is available in even the most isolated communities and most have running water. This is due to the regions abundant hydroelectric resources. Roads for cars in many towns, running water, government medical clinics and electric power lines did not appear in many areas until the 1980s.

Despite the improvements, the region still remains behind the rest of the country in infrastructure. Drainage and sewerage services are still scarce. The linking of the region made the cash economy, started and supported by the growing of coffee, dominant. This brought in money for consumer goods such as televisions and radios. However, it has also made cash a necessity for food and many other goods. Coffee prices dropped after government controls were eliminated in the early 1980s. This has forced many in the area to migrate out, temporarily or permanently to other parts of Mexico and to the United States to work. This is especially true during the months between main coffee harvests.

== Economy ==
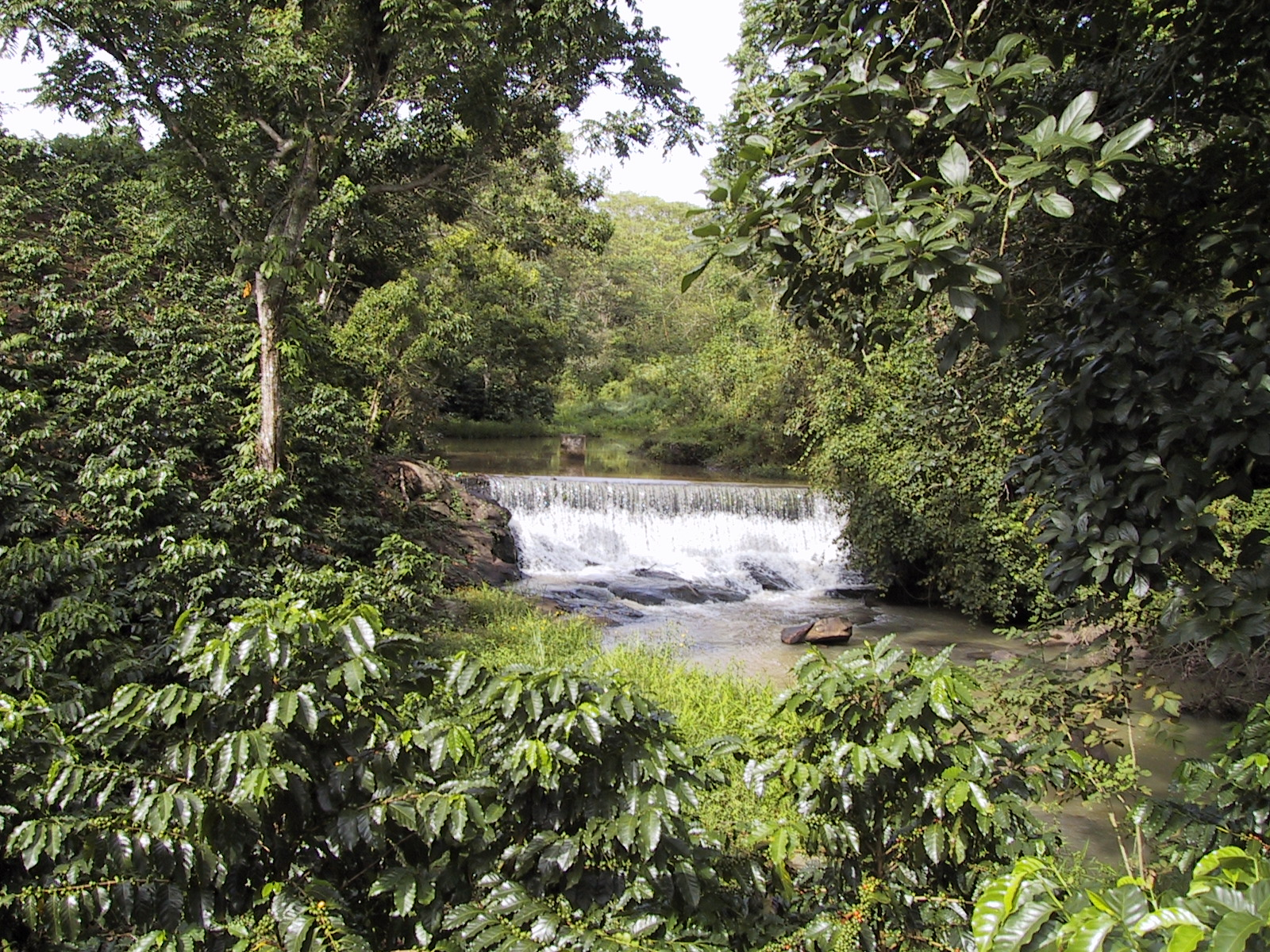
View of the Zihuateutla coffee plantation

The area has a high index of socioeconomic marginalization. Historically, this was because of its geographic isolation, but since the 19th century it has been more related to the introduction of a cash economy. This marginalization is most acutely found in the rural indigenous areas as power and wealth are concentrated in the major towns dominated by mestizos. The need for cash and the lack of opportunities since the latter 20th century has spurred high temporary and permanent emigration out of the region. Seasonal workers generally migrate to Mexico City, Puebla and the state of Veracruz to work in agriculture and/or construction. Since the 1980s, many have also left to work in the United States, where many have stayed permanently.

The principal economic activity is agriculture, mostly corn, beans and other foods for auto-consumption. Other crops include potatoes, chili peppers, sugar cane, citrus fruit, bananas, plums, apples and peaches. Puebla is the fourth largest producer of coffee in Mexico, most of which is grown between 150 and 1,400 meters above sea level. The main coffee-producing region for Puebla is the Sierra Norte which accounts for 91% of land planted with the crop and 97% of the total production with an average annual yield of 5.5 tons of coffee berries per hectare. This cash income is not only important for large scale producers such as Zihuateutla, Jopala and Xicotepec, but also for smaller and family enterprises as well. Primarily shade tree coffee is grown, which has allowed the preservation of much of the native tree species needed for that shade. Coffee is only one of a number of crops that can be grown here due to climate and soil composition. One alternative cash crop is black pepper. Other cash crops include mamey, vanilla and medicinal herbs. Floriculture is very important in the municipalities of Huauchinango, Tlaola, Xicotepec and Zihuateutla. These four municipalities cooperate as the Unión Agrícola Regional de Floricultures y Viveristas to commercialize their products outside the region. One of the important ornamental plants produced is the poinsettia.

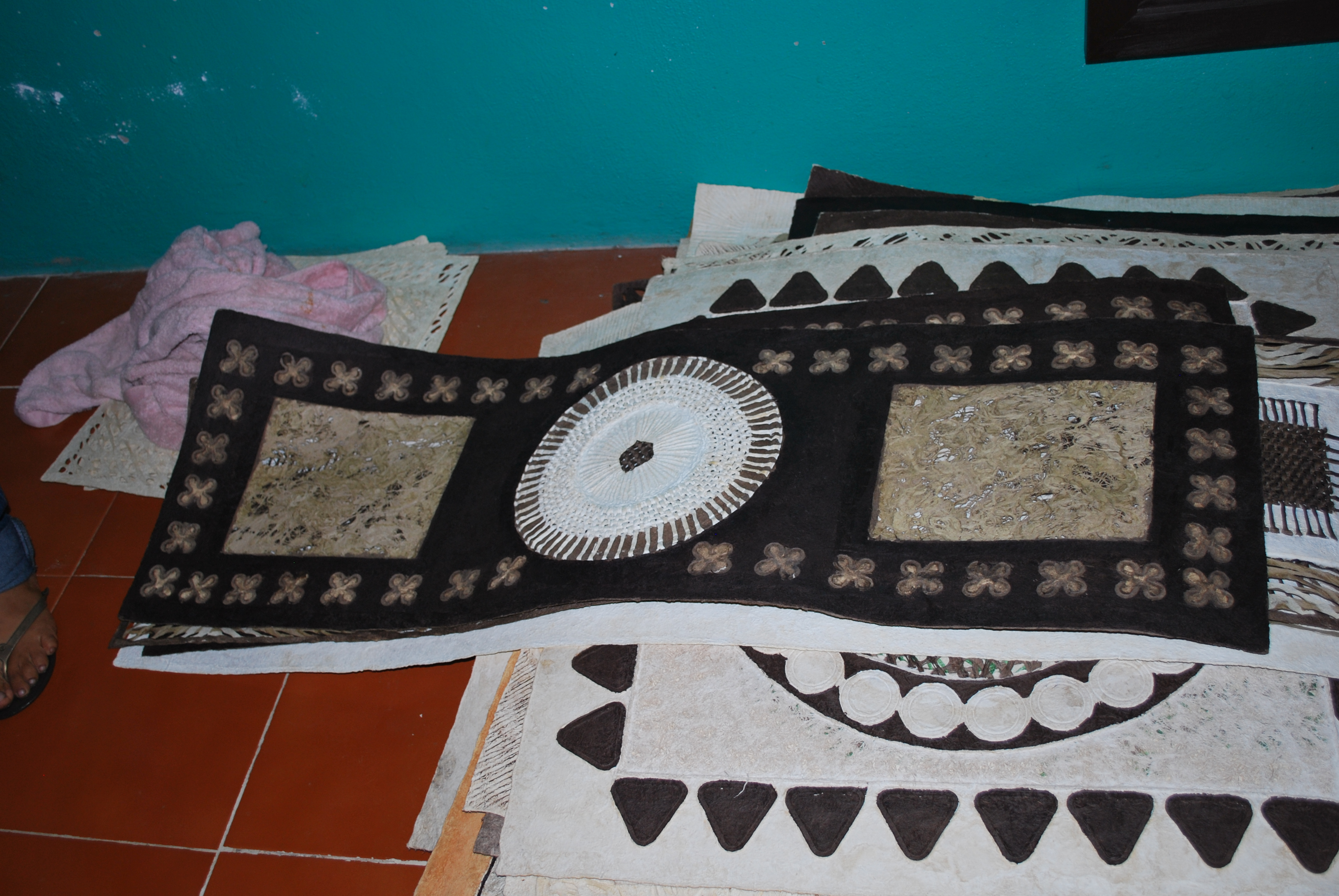
Amate paper wall hangings on display in San Pablito

Due to small scale production and lack of technology, most agriculture here cannot compete with other regions of Mexico. Most growers are small and do not invest capital in their farms. Since the 1980s, coffee prices have been low which has decreased production as farmers switch to other crops. The soils of the far north of region are generally acidic and require fertilizers and lime in many areas to be productive. Much of the region is used for pasture and forestry. Most of the rest of the area has richer volcanic soils with allows for some agriculture but these soils are susceptible to erosion and much is still forest, mostly pine.

Industry in the area is mostly based on handcrafts in family workshops with some small factories. Chignahuapan is Mexico's largest producer of blown glass Christmas tree ornaments, with a production of 70 million per year among 400 workshops. The handcrafts tradition of the region goes back to the pre Hispanic period. After it was conquered by the Aztecs, a tribute item was cotton garments, which were highly prized. Today, it is mostly done as a complement to agricultural activities, with some exceptions, with most learning their skills in childhood. Communities tend to specialize in a certain handcrafts. Pottery is mostly made in the towns of Aquixtla, Tetela de Ocampo, Tenextatiloyan and Zacatlán. Textiles made with backstrap or more modern looms (and often embroidered) is more widespread. Most of this is related to women's garments such as the embroidered blouses, skirts and a poncho-like garment called as quezquemitl. Most garments vary in design depending on origin and some communities make garments for sale, but in different colors and designs then those made for home use.

In the 1970s, the Otomi of San Pablito, Pahuatlán began producing amate or bark paper commercially, a first almost exclusively for Nahua painters in the state of Guerrero. The paper has grown in popularity for various uses and is sold both nationally and internationally. As of 2009, there were at least 200 craftsmen in the trade in the town with a yearly production value of about 500,000 pesos. The production has caused environmental damage as trees are stripped for bark and chemicals from the process such as caustic soda make their way into the San Pedro River. There have been efforts to plant and grow new types of trees that provide back in 5 or 6 years as well as the introduction of nonpolluting chemicals.

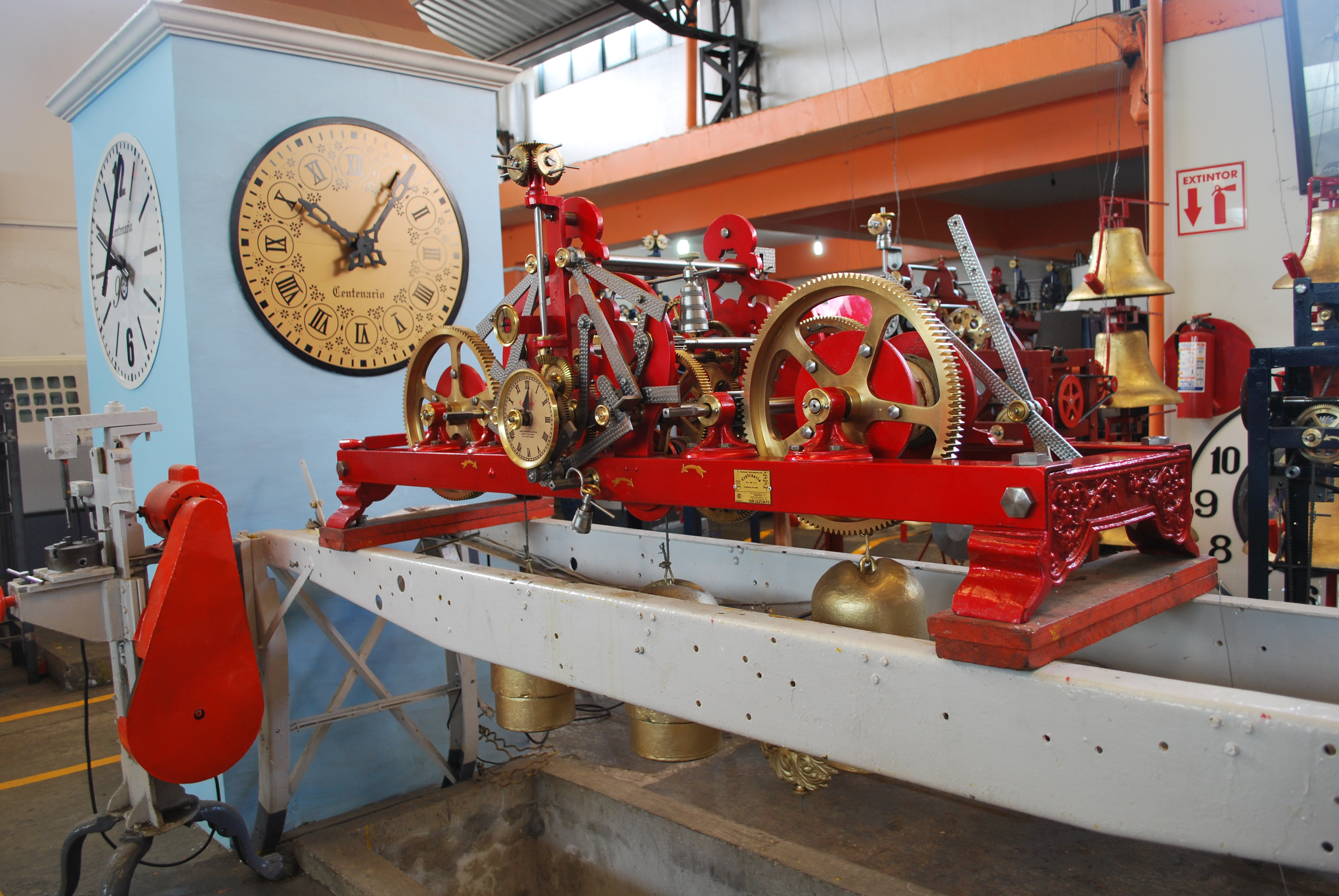
View inside the Relojes Centenario clock factory

Xochitlán and Zacatlán produce hard apple cider and various fruit wines with a sugar cane liquor called "aguardiente" widely produced although illegal. Zacatlán has two factories, one which produces pistols and Relojes Centenario, Mexico's best known monumental clock maker. There has been some industrialization such as the introduction of maquiladoras in the municipalities of Hueytamalco, Teziutlán, Ocotepec and Pahuatlán.

Teziutlán mines magnesium, iron, silicon, lime, clay, kaolin, and chalk. PEMEX has pumping stations in the region, especially around Huauchinango. Libres has some refining of petroleum and of nonmetallic minerals, as well as furniture making. Tepeyahualco has several small manufacturers of campers for pickups.

Since the very late 20th century, state and federal authorities have been promoting tourism here as a form of economic development. This tourism is based on the region's environmental resources and indigenous cultural heritage. In 2011, Mexico's National Forest Commission granted 400,000 pesos to various enterprises to promote tourism in the Sierra Norte. The Commission promotes this region actively at the annual Nature Tourism Fair in Puebla. The goal is to protect the natural resources of the area while allowing for economic development. Nature tourism for the region includes visiting rural towns, hiking, camping, environmental education, controlled hunting, photographic safaris and recreational fishing. From 2007 to 2009, the Commission supported a total of thirty seven projects related to tourism in the region with a total of 14,518,460 pesos.

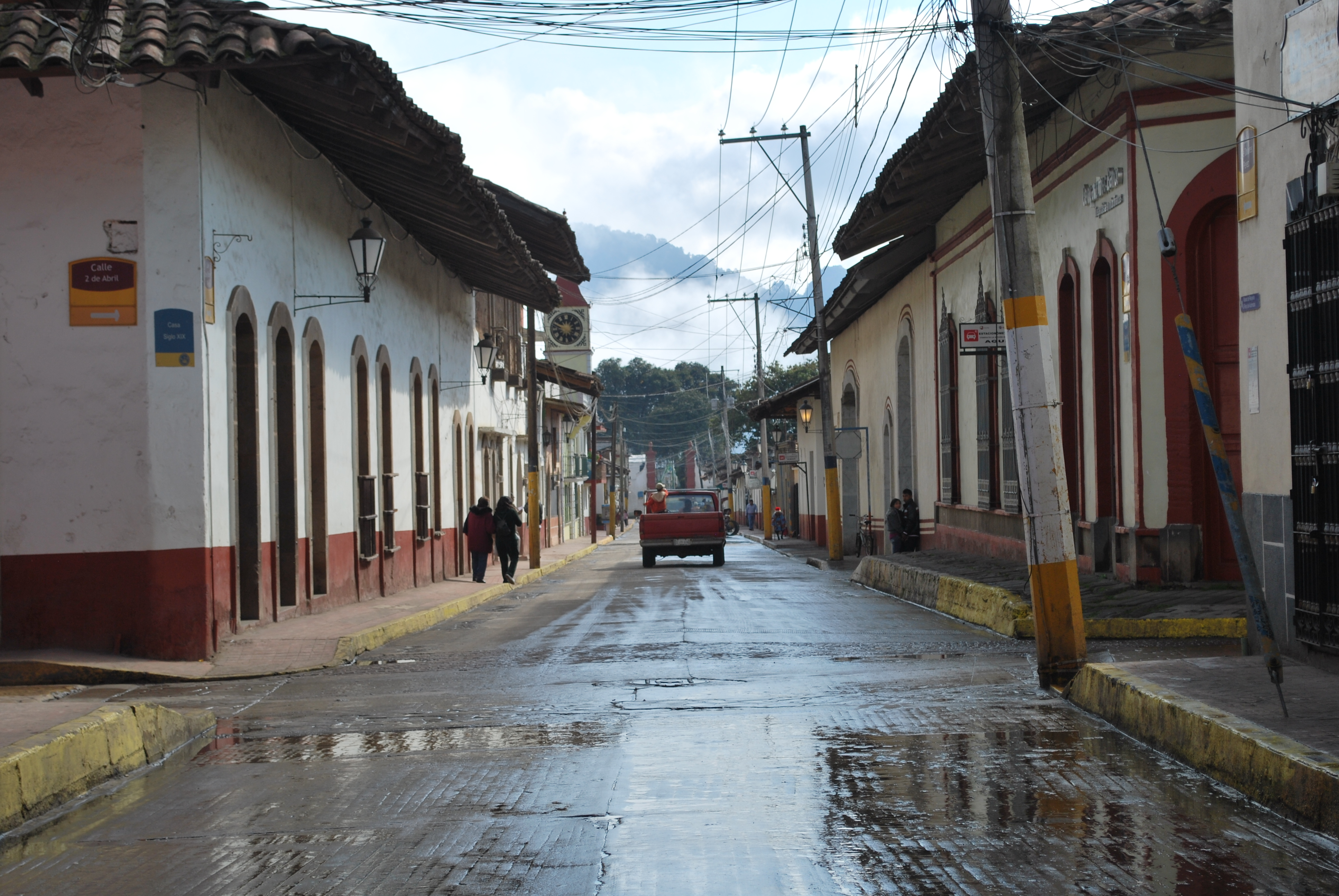
View of street in downtown Zacatlán

However, most of the investment has been in the main towns dominated by the mestizo population and not the rural indigenous communities outside of the municipal seats. Two areas which have been heavily promoted are the towns of Zacatlán and Cuetzalan, both of which have been named Pueblos Mágicos. Most of the tourism development has been related to a corridor to connect the main attractions of the region. To become designated as Pueblos Mágicos, both cities underwent significant restoration costing millions of pesos.

Indigenous culture has been promoted for tourism by the introduction of a number of new festivals. One of these is the Muestra de Etnias (Demonstration of Ethnicities). In 2011, Pahuatlán hosted the first Encuentro de Voladors de la Sierra Norte de Puebla exhibition for Voladores performers with the aim of promoting the area's culture for tourism.

However, some indigenous people have managed to take advantage of the tourism surge. Masseualsiuamej Mosenyolchicauanij (Women who work together) is a Nahua cooperative that was begun in the 1990s and has 120 members currently. Its main focus is the production and sale of handcrafts as well as the women's rights. In 1997, the cooperative established a hotel and ecotourism center called Taselotzin owned and controlled entirely by these women.

== Education ==
Widespread public education was not available in the region until the 1960s. Today, all municipalities offer education to the middle school level and most have high schools.

The Universidad de la Sierra is a private institution in Huauchinango. Teziutlán has a campus of the Universidad Pedagógica Nacional and a campus of the Facultad de Ingeniería Agrohidráulica of the Benemérita Universidad Autónoma de Puebla. The university began as the Instituto Poblano de Estudios Superiores in 1980 to serve students who cannot leave the area to pursue higher education. However, it also attracts students from other parts of Puebla as well as Hidalgo and Veracruz. Other institutions of higher education include Instituto Tecnológico Superior de la Sierra Norte de Puebla and the Instituto Tecnológico Superior de Zacapoaxtla.
