= Xonotla =

Coordinates: 19°49′N 97°48′W

- Municipality
- Interactive map of Xonotla
- Country: Mexico
- State: Puebla
- Municipal seat: Xonotla (town)
- Time zone: UTC-6 (CST)
  - Summer (DST): UTC-5 (CDT)
- Website: (in Spanish)

Xonotla is a town located northeast of Puebla in Mexico. It shares a border with Tuzamapan de Galeana to the north, Cuetzálan del Progreso to the east, Zoquiapan and Nauzontla to the south and Caxhuacan and Huehuetla to the west. Its population is 755.

== Name ==
The town gets its name from the Nahuatl word "xonotl," which means jonote (Heliocarpus appendiculatus), and "-tla," which means abundant, which together means "where the jonote is abundant." The town was called "Xonotla" by the people because there are many trees whose oil was used to cure ailments. The place was named by Ixocélotl whose name means "jaguar face."

== History ==
The place was founded by Ixocélotl in 1180 A.D. Xonotla was a densely populated area when the conquistadors arrived. Two languages were spoken at that time, Náhuatl and Totonaca. In 1591, San Martín Tuzamapan, Santiago Ecatlán and San Francisco Ayotoxco belonged to Xonotla. Moctezuma conquered this area and received tribute of corn, beans and chile when it was available.

On 13 August 1552, Diego Ramirez charted the town. In 1608, an epidemic swept through the town.

== Geography ==
The town measures 73.99 square kilometers. Its altitude is 800 meters above sea level and goes down to 500 meters toward the Zempoala and Tozán rivers.

== Climate ==
The climate is humid and warm, with rains throughout the year.

== Main ecosystems ==
Flora are chalahuite, jonote, blood of degree, encino, charcoal, cedar, mahogany and a great variety of perennial leaf shrubs. It has ferns, including arborescentes, orchids, camellias, lilies and tulips. Agriculture consists of coffee plantations and small corn farms.

Fauna range from armadillo, wild boar, coyote, tejón, rabbit, squirrel, doves, and to chachalacas. Reptiles include coralillo, flying, aquatic nauyaca, mazacuate, trout, catfish, prawn, acamaya, and others.

== Natural resources ==
Wood from the forests is used for construction.

The ground can be classified into 4 characteristic groups:

- Lithosol: It is the predominant ground. It occupies more than 50% of the surface mainly in the central and southwest portion.
- Regosol: It is located in the northeastern portion. It presents onerous phase.
- Phaeozem: It is located in the creek of Apulco.
- Andosol: It is located in a reduced area of the southwest

== Population ==
There are two ethnic groups. The largest is the Náhuatl followed by the Totonaco. According to the 1995 census, the population is 4,559.

== Economic activity ==
Xonotla produces corn, beans and coffee. Farm animals include cattle, pigs, goats, donkeys and rabbits. The fishing industry relies on catfish, prawns, mojarra, robalo, acamayas and rive in the area.

The primary industries are nixtamal mills and furniture manufacturing.

== Tourism ==
Legend has it that a miracle took place in the church. Many years ago, a native walking across the mountain saw a rock fall away from the mountain. He investigated to see if everything was all right, and found a virgin maiden in a cave. People pray at the site.
