= Zaragoza Municipality =

Zaragoza Municipality may refer to:

- Zaragoza Municipality, Antioquia, Colombia
- Zaragoza Municipality, Coahuila, Mexico
- Zaragoza Municipality, Puebla, Mexico
- Zaragoza Municipality, San Luis Potosí, Mexico
- Zaragoza Municipality, Veracruz, Mexico
- Zaragoza Municipality, El Salvador
- Zaragoza Municipality, Guatemala
