= Chachahuantla =

- Town
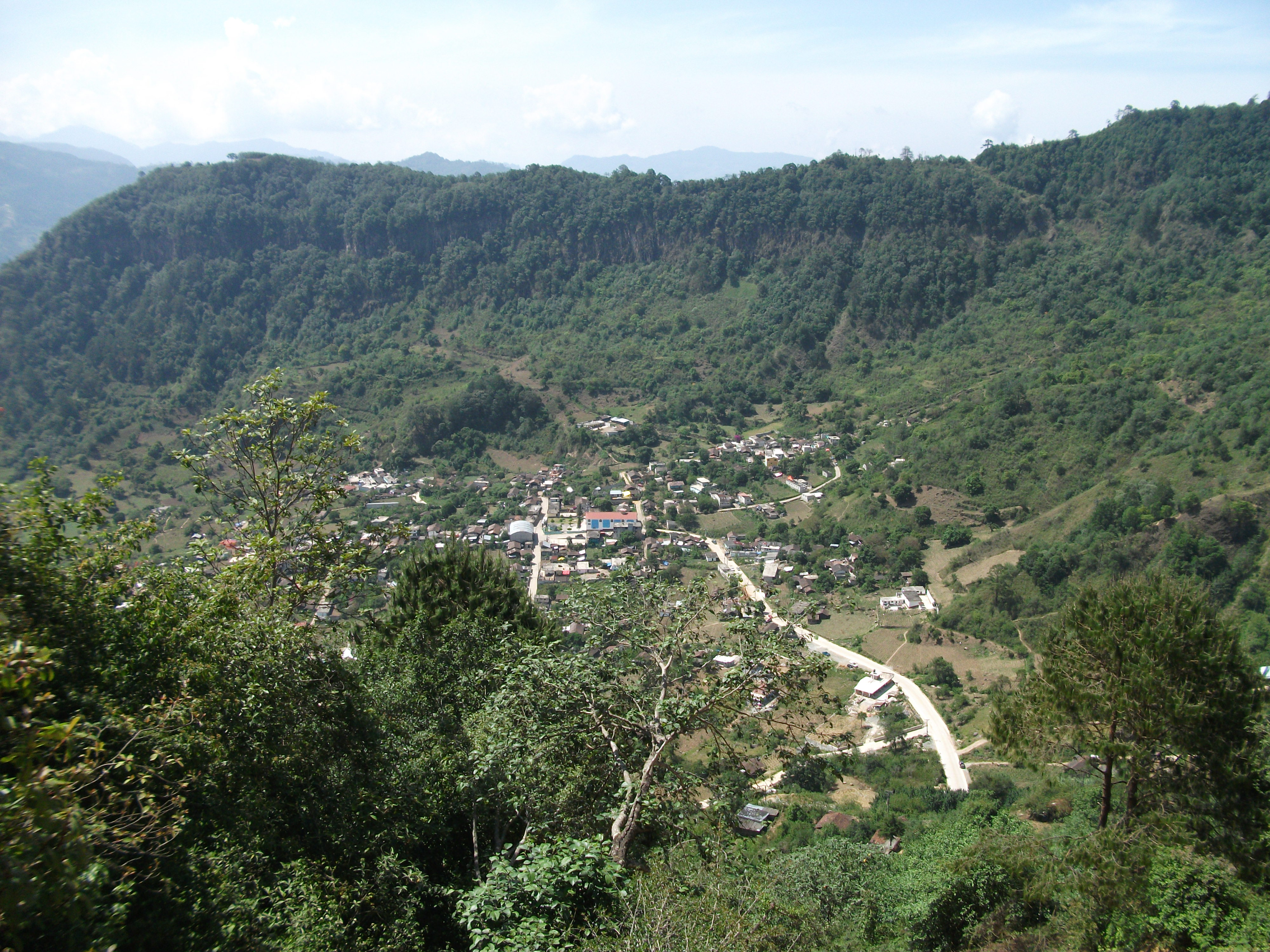
- Panoramic of the town of Chachahuantla
- Interactive map of Chachahuantla
- Coordinates: 20°16′32″N 98°09′01″W
- Country: Mexico
- State: Puebla
- Municipality: Naupan
- Founded: 1532
- Municipal Status: 19th century
- Elevation (of seat): 1,600 m (5,200 ft)

Population (2010) Municipality
  - Municipality: 20,619
- Time zone: UTC-6 (CST)
- Postal code (of seat): 73100

Chachahuantla is a town in the municipality of Naupan, located in the northwest of the state of Puebla in central Mexico. The town is part of the Sierra Norte region of the state, a steep mountainous area, and borders the state of Hidalgo. The people speak the Nahuatl language and Spanish.
