= El Jícaro =

El Jícaro could mean either of the following geographical locations:

- El Jícaro, El Progreso, Guatemala
- El Jícaro, Nueva Segovia, Nicaragua
- El Jícaro, Veracruz, Mexico
- El Jícaro, Texiguat, El Paraiso, Honduras. Its geographical coordinates are 13° 42' 19" North, 87° 0' 34" West.
- El Jícaro (river), El Salvador
