= José Luis Flores Hernández =

Mexican economist and politician

- Born: 7 January 1950 (age 76); Cuetzalan, Puebla, Mexico
- Occupations: Economist and politician
- Political party: PRI

José Luis Flores Hernández (born 7 January 1950) is a Mexican economist and politician affiliated with the Institutional Revolutionary Party (PRI). He has been elected to the Chamber of Deputies for Puebla's 3rd district twice: in the 1997 mid-terms, for the 57th Congress, and in the 2003 mid-terms, for the 59th Congress.
