= Concepción González Molina =

Mexican politician

- Born: 6 August 1953 (age 72); Teziutlán, Puebla, Mexico
- Occupation: Politician
- Political party: PRI

Concepción González Molina (born 6 August 1953) is a Mexican politician from the Institutional Revolutionary Party (PRI). In the 2000 general election she was elected to the Chamber of Deputies to represent Puebla's 3rd district during the 58th session of Congress.
