= Jorge Juraidini =

Mexican politician

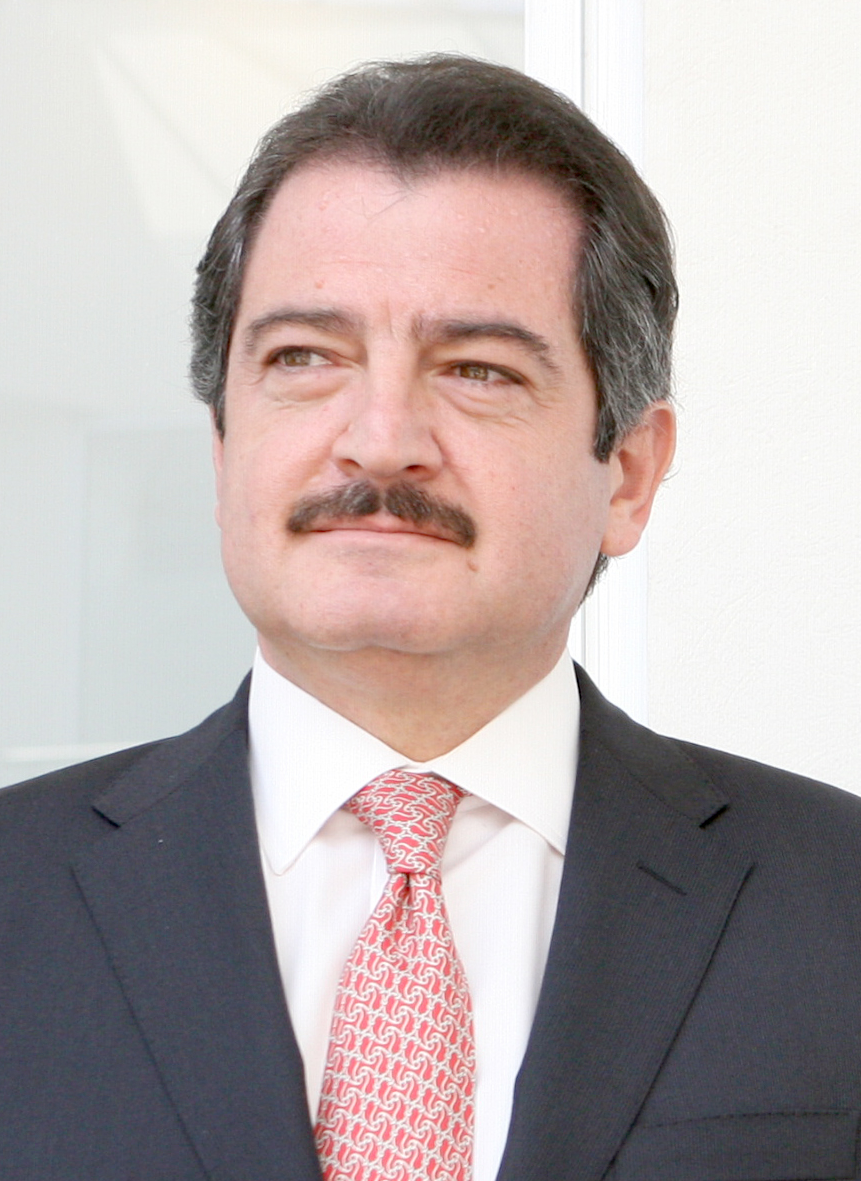
- Born: 6 March 1960 (age 66); Teziutlán, Puebla, Mexico
- Occupation: Politician
- Political party: PRI

Jorge Alberto Juraidini Rumilla (born 6 March 1960) is a Mexican politician from the Institutional Revolutionary Party (PRI). In the 2009 mid-terms he was elected to the Chamber of Deputies to represent Puebla's 3rd district during the 61st session of Congress.
