= José Guillermo Fuentes Ortiz =

Mexican politician (born 1951)

- Born: 4 December 1951 (age 74); Puebla, Mexico
- Education: IPN
- Occupation: Politician
- Political party: PAN

José Guillermo Fuentes Ortiz (born 4 December 1951) is a Mexican politician affiliated with the National Action Party (PAN).

He was the municipal president of Guadalupe Victoria, Puebla, from 2002 to 2005, and in the 2006 general election, he was elected to the Chamber of Deputies to represent Puebla's 3rd district during the 60th session of Congress.
