= Dos Arroyos =

- Municipality and village
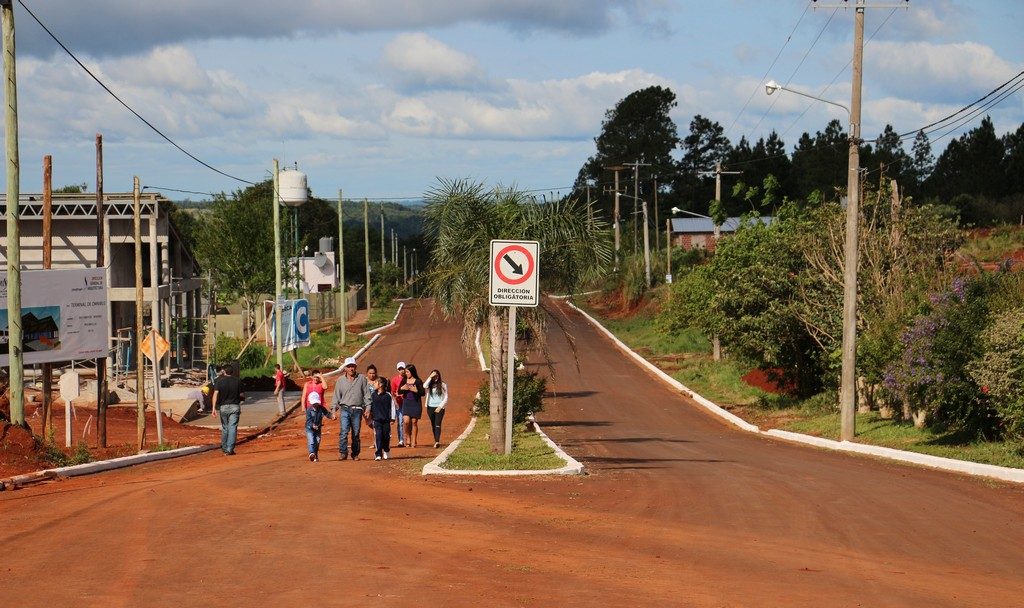

- Location within Misiones Province Location within Argentina
- Country: Argentina
- Province: Misiones Province
- Time zone: UTC−3 (ART)

Dos Arroyos is a village and municipality in Misiones Province in north-eastern Argentina.

== Location ==
Dos Arroyos is an Argentine municipality in the province of Misiones, located within the department of Leandro N. Alem. It borders with the municipalities of Gobernador G. López, Arroyos del Medio, Leandro N Alem, Mojón Grande and Itacaruaré. The place is located between two streams, the López stream and the Guerrero stream, that are united a few kilometers downstream. In the beginning, the teachers had to cross both streams to reach the town of San Javier, where they collected their wages. If these two streams were overflowed, they could not pass, which finally gave it the current name.

== Background ==
The origin of the population dates back to the beginning of the 20th century, with the arrival of immigrants from Brazil. Among them were a large number of Italians, Spaniards and Brazilians and other nationalities. In 1935 the first Development Commission was created, which would eventually become the present municipality.

== Current details ==
Currently, the head of the municipality of Dos Arroyos is Mr. Rosario Becker, of the Renovating Party of the Social Concord (FPV). The Deliberative Council counts on three banks; the same ones are occupied by the councilor Adela Scorvodovscki and Bebe Piñeyro by the oficialismo, and by Antonio Pretto by the UCR. The municipality counts that the population is 3,079 inhabitants, according to the census of the year 2001 (INDEC).

== Economic activities ==
The population of the municipality is dedicated to the harvest of yerba for the cultivation of tobacco and sugar cane. They also manufacture bricks. Many people migrate to other locations to work.
