= Yaonáhuac =

Coordinates: 19°52′N 97°27′W

- Municipality
- Location in Mexico Yaonáhuac (Mexico)
- Country: Mexico
- State: Puebla
- Demonym: (in Spanish)
- Time zone: UTC−6 (CST)

Yaonáhuac is the municipal seat of Yaonáhuac Municipality, in the Mexican state of Puebla.

== Nomenclature ==
Two translations exist for "Yaonáhuac":

- It may come from huey, "great"; atl "water"; ohtli, and náhuac, "way" and via "together, close". Hence "next to the great waterway".
- Or it may come from yau, "to go" or "to walk" and náhuac, "together", "they go together", referring to two small rivers that are united later to form the Puxtla river.
