= San Mateo Ozolco, Puebla =

Coordinates: 19°06′N 98°30′W

San Mateo Ozolco is a community of around 500 people on the slopes of Popocatépetl in Puebla, Mexico.

In 2006 around one quarter to one third of the citizens of San Mateo was living in Philadelphia, Pennsylvania, United States. The South Philly neighborhood where most Ozolqueños reside has acquired the humorous nickname Puebladelfia
