= Tepeyahualco =

Coordinates: 19.4915°N 97.4897°W

- Municipality and town
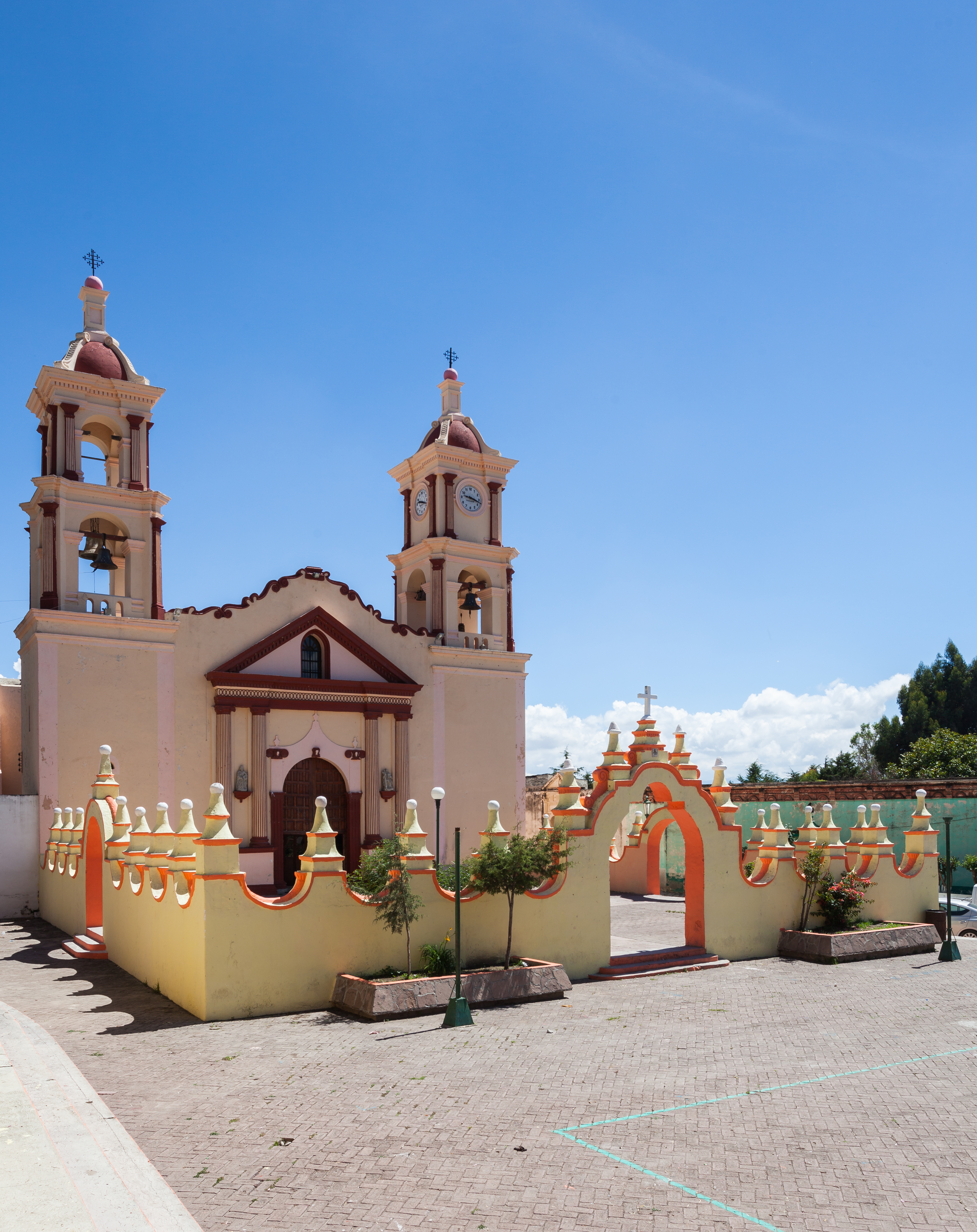
- San Pedro hermitage, Tepeyahualco.
- Interactive map of Tepeyahualco
- Country: Mexico
- State: Puebla
- Time zone: UTC-6 (Zona Centro)

Tepeyahualco is a town and municipality in the Mexican state of Puebla.
