= Ayotoxco de Guerrero =

Coordinates: 20°06′N 97°24′W

- Municipality and town
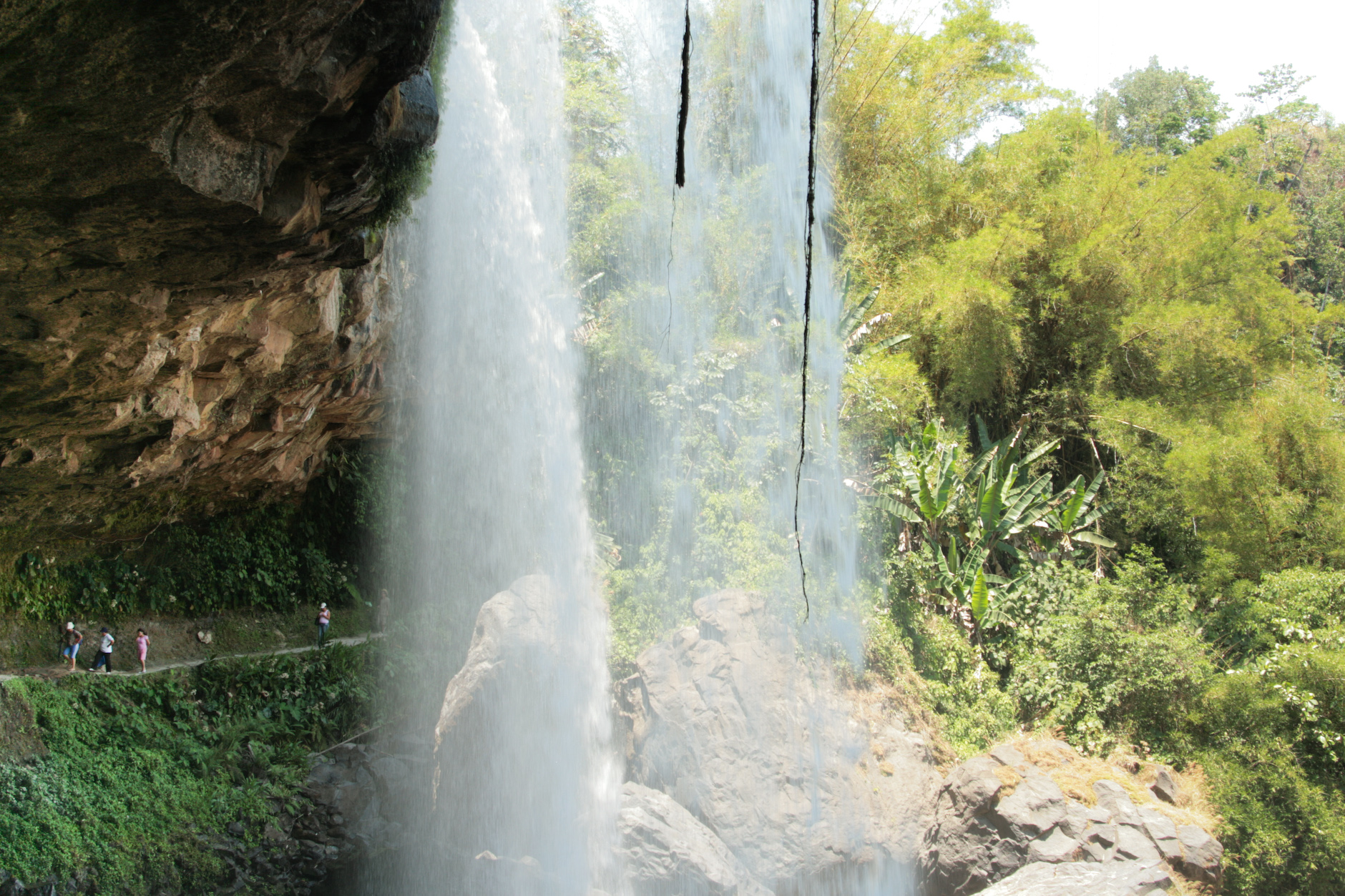

- Coat of arms
- Interactive map of Ayotoxco de Guerrero
- Country: Mexico
- State: Puebla

Population (2020)
  - Total: 8,208
- Time zone: UTC-6 (Zona Centro)

Ayotoxco de Guerrero is a town and municipality in the Mexican state of Puebla.
