= El Jícaro, Veracruz =

Coordinates: 18.5446°N 96.2510°W

El Jícaro is a small town in the municipality of Tierra Blanca, in the Mexican state of Veracruz. It stands in the Río Papaloapan basin, at the 83rd kilometer of the Veracruz–Tierra Blanca railroad. The town has 116 schools.
