= Cuyoaco =

Coordinates: 19°37′N 97°37′W

- Municipality
- Coat of arms
- Interactive map of Cuyoaco
- Country: Mexico
- State: Puebla
- Time zone: UTC-6 (Zona Centro)

Cuyoaco is a municipality in the Mexican state of Puebla.
