= Hueytamalco =

- Municipality and town
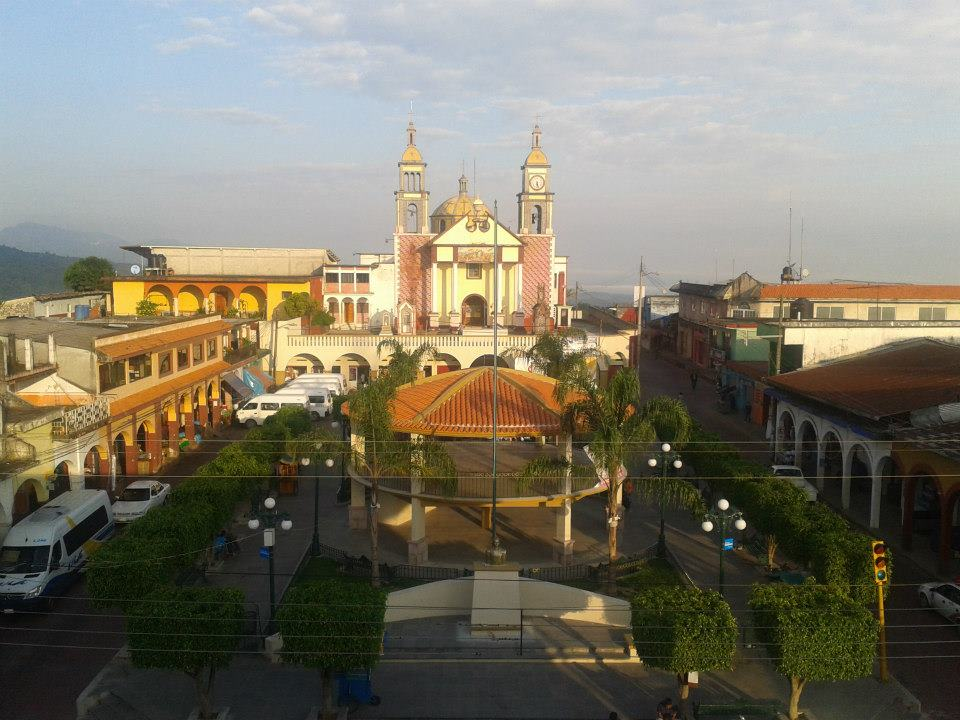

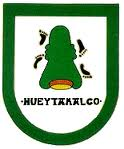
- Coat of arms
- Interactive map of Hueytamalco
- Country: Mexico
- State: Puebla
- Time zone: UTC-6 (Zona Centro)

Hueytamalco is a town and municipality in the Mexican state of Puebla.
