= Jonotla =

Coordinates: 20°03′N 97°35′W

- Municipality
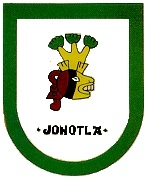
- Coat of arms
- Interactive map of Jonotla
- Country: Mexico
- State: Puebla
- Time zone: UTC-6 (Zona Centro)

Jonotla is a municipality in the Mexican state of Puebla.
