= Ocotepec, Puebla =

Coordinates: 19°33′23″N 97°38′56″W

Ocotepec
- Municipality and town
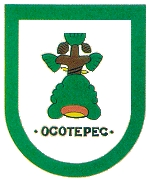
- Coat of arms

- Location of the municipality in Puebla
- Country: Mexico
- State: Puebla

Population (2020)
  - Total: 5,077
- Time zone: UTC-6 (Zona Centro)

Ocotepec is a town and municipality in the Mexican state of Puebla.
