= Zoquiapan =

Coordinates: 20°00′37″N 97°35′46″W

- Municipality and town
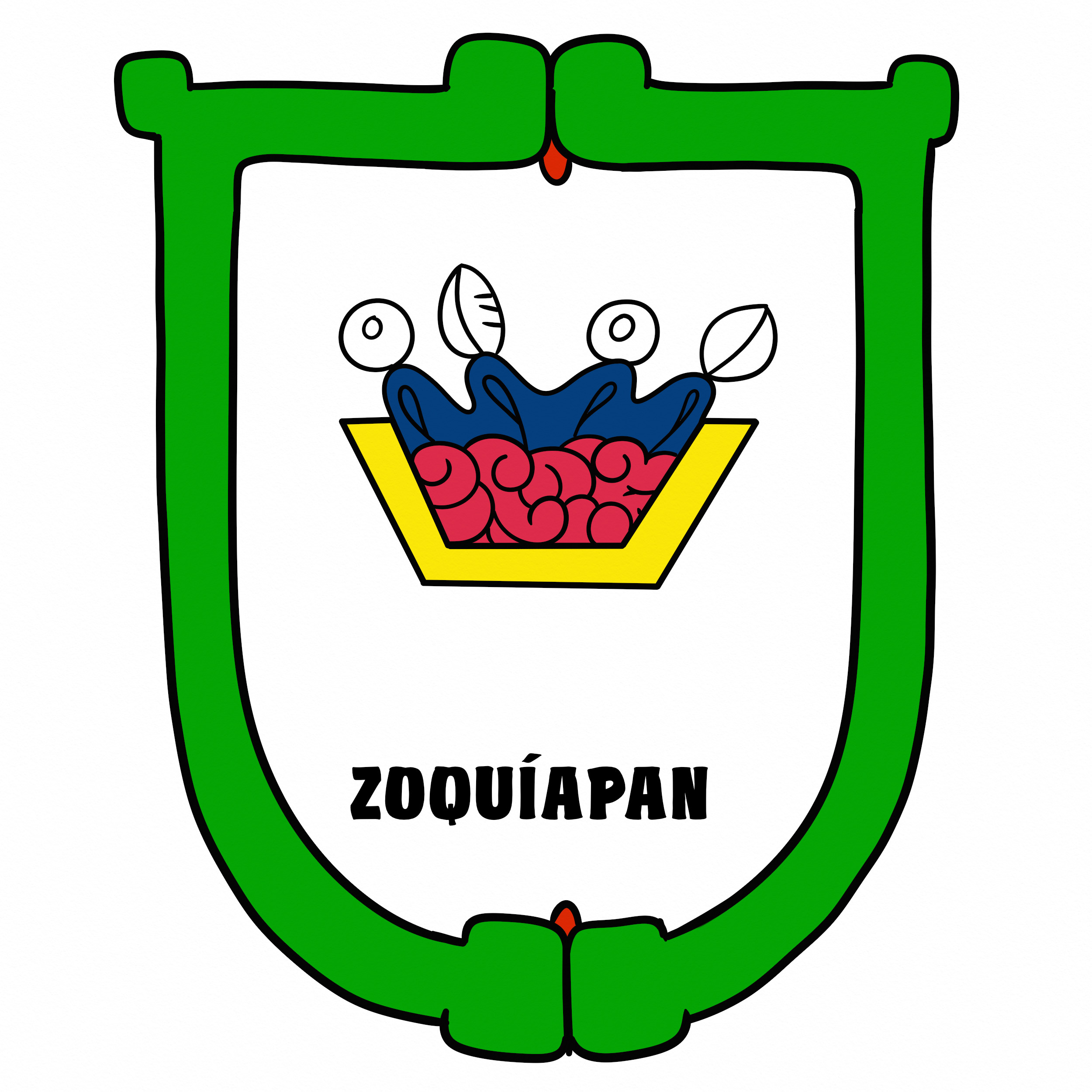
- Coat of arms
- Interactive map of Zoquiapan
- Country: Mexico
- State: Puebla
- Time zone: UTC-6 (Zona Centro)

Zoquiapan is a town and municipality in the Mexican state of Puebla.
