= Nauzontla =

Coordinates: 19°58′N 97°35′W

- Municipality and town
- Interactive map of Nauzontla
- Country: Mexico
- State: Puebla
- Time zone: UTC-6 (Zona Centro)

Nauzontla is a town and municipality in the Mexican state of Puebla.
