= Zaragoza, Puebla =

Mexico

- City and municipality
- Coat of arms

- Location within Puebla (state) Location within Mexico
- Coordinates: 19.7458°N 97.5667°W
- Country: Mexico
- State: Puebla

Population (2020)
  - Total: 16,752
  - Seat: 11,487
- Time zone: UTC-6 (Zona Centro)

Zaragoza is a municipality in the Mexican state of Puebla.

== Geography ==
=== Climate ===
The territory involved in the temperate zone of the Sierra Norte, has four climatic variations. Since semi-cold humid climate with summer rains (ce) (W2), the mean annual temperature between 5 and 12 °C (41 and 54 °F), the temperature of the coldest month from less than 3 and 18 °C (37 and 64 °F). Those whose dry month precipitation is less than 40 millimeters, and a percentage of winter precipitation over the year, between 5 and 10.2 mm. Occur in the mountainous southeast. Humid temperate climate (w '9) (w), with summer rainfall, with mean annual temperature between 12 and 18 °C (54 and 64 °F)., temperature of the coldest month from less than 3 and 18 °C, rate of precipitation during winter regarding the annual 5 to 10.2. Is the predominant climate is observed in the middle. The humid temperate climate (CM), with summer rainfall, mean annual temperature between 12 and 10 °C (54 and 50 °F), temperature of the coldest month, from less than 3 and 18 °C, precipitation of driest month less than 40 mm, and the percentage of precipitation winter with respect to annual more than 5 mm.
