= Tenampulco =

Coordinates: 20.1714°N 97.4058°W

- Municipality and town
- Interactive map of Tenampulco
- Country: Mexico
- State: Puebla
- Time zone: UTC-6 (Zona Centro)

Tenampulco is a town and municipality in the Mexican state of Puebla.
