= Tlatlauquitepec =

Coordinates: 19.8514°N 97.4961°W

- Municipality and town
- Coat of arms
- Interactive map of Tlatlauquitepec
- Country: Mexico
- State: Puebla
- Time zone: UTC-6 (Zona Centro)

Tlatlauquitepec is a town and municipality in the Mexican state of Puebla. It has been designated as a Pueblo Mágico since 2012. The name originates from the Nahuatl words "Tlatlahui" (to color), "Téptl" (hill), and "Co" (place), collectively meaning "hill that colors".

== History ==
The region around Tlatlauquitepec was originally inhabited by Totonacs, but was mostly conquered by Nahuas in the late 1100s. Fruits, liquidambar and pines were plentiful near this town. It was conquered by Nezahualcoyotl and/or Moctezuma I and incorporated into the Aztec Empire as a tributary province. Tribute offered to the Aztecs consisted of clothing, warrior costumes, and liquidambar. Colonial tribute included cloth, clothing, liquidambar, honey, and labor on cotton and maize fields.
