= Tuzamapan de Galeana =

- Municipality and town
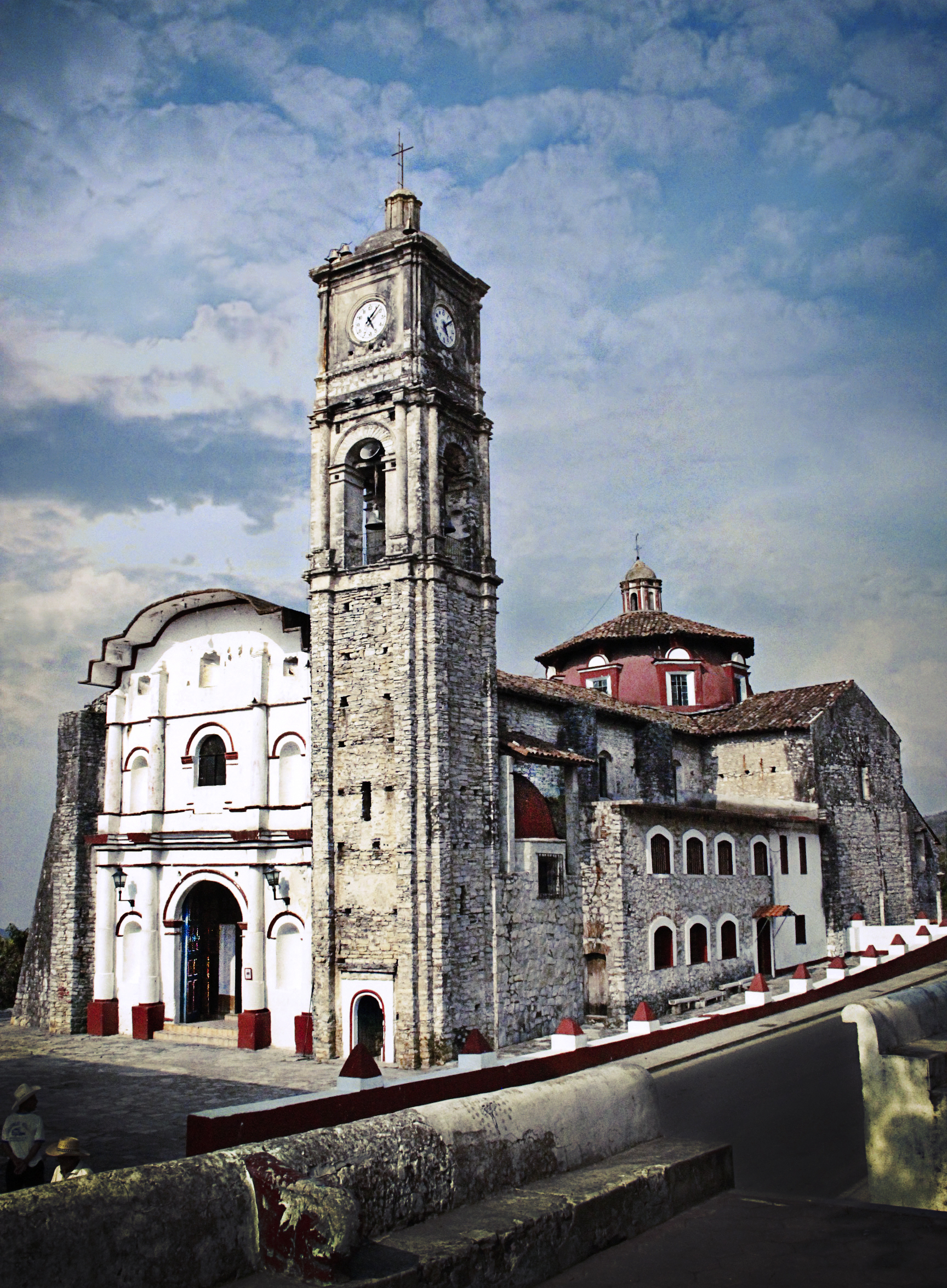
- Tuzamapan de Galeana, Puebla

- Location within Puebla (state) Location within Mexico
- Coordinates: 20°05′N 97°34′W
- Country: Mexico
- State: Puebla
- Time zone: UTC-6 (Zona Centro)

Tuzamapan de Galeana is a town and municipality in the state of Puebla in eastern Mexico. In 2020, the municipality had a population of 5,924, down 0.99% from 2010.
