= Puebla =

State of Mexico

- State
- Free and Sovereign State of Puebla; Estado Libre y Soberano de Puebla (Spanish); Tlahtohcayotl Puebla (Nahuatl)
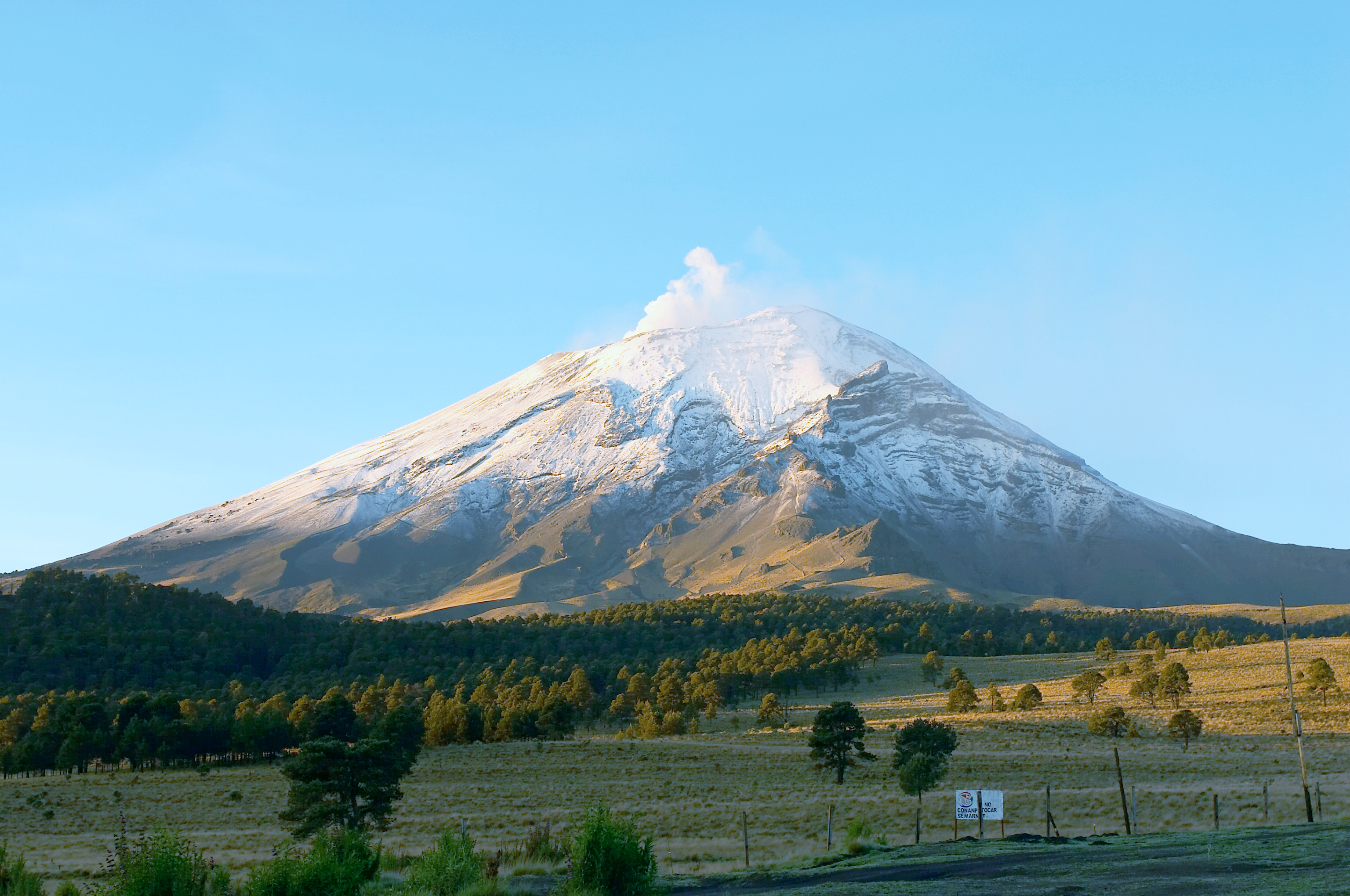
- The Iztaccíhuatl–Popocatépetl National Park

- Coat of arms
- Motto: Unidos En El Tiempo, En El Esfuerzo, En La Justicia y En La Esperanza (United in time, effort, justice and hope)
- Anthem: Himno al Estado de Puebla
- State of Puebla within Mexico
- Coordinates: 19°0′N 97°53′W
- Country: Mexico
- Capital and largest city: Puebla de Zaragoza
- Largest metro: Greater Puebla
- Municipalities: 217
- Admission: December 21, 1823
- Order: 4th

Government
  - Governor: Alejandro Armenta Mier
  - Senators: Vacant; Nancy de la Sierra Arámburo; Nadia Navarro Acevedo
  - Deputies: Federal deputies: • 16; • 2; • 2; • 2; • 2

Area
  - Total: 34,306 km^{2} (13,246 sq mi)
- Ranked 21st
- Highest elevation (Pico de Orizaba): 5,610 m (18,410 ft)

Population (2020)
  - Total: 6,583,278
  - Rank: 5th
  - Density: 191.90/km^{2} (497.02/sq mi)
  - Rank: 6th
- Demonym: Poblano (a)

GDP (2022)
  - Total: MXN 903 billion (US$44.9 billion)
  - Per capita: US$6,736
- Time zone: UTC−06:00 (CST)
- Postal code: 72-75
- Area code: Area codes: • 1; • 2; • 3
- ISO 3166 code: MX-PUE
- HDI: ▲0.755 high Ranked 29th of 32
- Website: www.puebla.gob.mx

Puebla, (Note: Spanish pronunciation: [ˈpweβla], 'colony, settlement') officially the Free and Sovereign State of Puebla, (Note: Spanish: Estado Libre y Soberano de Puebla) is one of the 31 states that, along with Mexico City, comprise the Federal Entities of Mexico. It is divided into 217 municipalities and its capital is Puebla City. Part of east-central Mexico, it is bordered by the states of Veracruz to the north and east, Hidalgo, México, Tlaxcala and Morelos to the west, and Guerrero and Oaxaca to the south. The origins of the state lie in the city of Puebla, which was founded by the Spanish in this valley in 1531 to secure the trade route between Mexico City and the port of Veracruz. By the end of the 18th century, the area had become a colonial province with its own governor, which would become the State of Puebla, after the Mexican War of Independence in the early 19th century. Since that time the area, especially around the capital city, has continued to grow economically, mostly through industry, despite being the scene of a number of battles, the most notable of which being the Battle of Puebla. Today, the state is one of the most industrialized in the country, but since most of its development is concentrated in Puebla and other cities, many of its rural areas are undeveloped.

The state is home to the china poblana, mole poblano, active literary and arts scenes, and festivals such as Cinco de Mayo, Ritual of Quetzalcoatl, Day of the Dead celebrations (especially in Huaquechula) and Carnival (especially in Huejotzingo). It is home to five major indigenous groups: Nahuas, the Totonacs, the Mixtecs, the Popolocas and the Otomi, which can mostly be found in the far north and the far south of the state.

== Geography ==
The state is in the central highlands of Mexico between the Sierra Nevada and the Sierra Madre Oriental. It has a triangular shape with its narrow part to the north. It borders the states of Veracruz, Oaxaca, Guerrero, Morelos, State of Mexico, Tlaxcala and Hidalgo. The state occupies 33,919 km^{2}, ranking 20th of 31 states in size, and has 4,930 named communities.

=== Mountains ===
Most of the mountains of Puebla belong to the Sierra Madre Oriental and the Trans-Mexican Volcanic Belt. The first is locally called the Sierra Norte del Puebla, entering the state from the northwest and then breaks up into the smaller chains of Sierra de Zacapoaxtla, Sierra de Huauchinango, Sierra de Teziutlán, Sierra de Tetela de Ocampo, Sierra de Chignahuapan and Sierra de Zacatlán, although these names may vary among localities. Some of the highest elevations include Apulco, Chichat, Chignahuapan, Soltepec and Tlatlaquitepec. The highest elevations are the volcanoes Pico de Orizaba or Citlaltepetl (5,747masl), Popocatépetl (5,452masl), Iztaccíhuatl (5,286masl) and Malinche (4,461masl) which are found on the state's borders with Veracruz, Mexico State and Tlaxcala respectively. In the south of the state, the major elevations are the Sierra de Atenahuacán, Zapotitlán, Lomerio al Suroeste and the Sierra de Tehuacán. Dividing much of the state from Veracruz is a small chain of mountains called the Sierra Madre del Golfo.

The natural geography of the state subdivides into the Huasteco Plateau, Llanuras y Lomeríos zone, Lagos y Volcanes del Anáhuac, Chiconquiaco, Llanuras y Sierras de Querétaro e Hidalgo, Cordillera Costera del Sur, Mixteca Alta, Sierras y Valles Guerrenses, Sierras Centrales de Oaxaca, Sierras Orientales and Sur de Puebla. The Huasteco Plateau and the Llanuras y Lomeríos zone are located in the north and northeast, with the Lagos y Volcanes del Anáhuc in the center and north. Together, they account for over 50% of the state. The east and northeast are occupies by the Chiconquiaco and Llanudras y Sierras de Querétaro e Hidalgo areas and account for about three percent of the state. The Cordillera del Sur and Mixteca Alta are located in the west and southwest covering less than 2.5% of the state. The Sur de Puebla is in the southwest and accounts for 26% of the state. Other southern subregions include the Sierras y Valles Guerrerenses, the Sierras Centrales de Oaxaca and the Sierras Orientales. Together, they account for about 15% of the state.

=== Hydrology ===
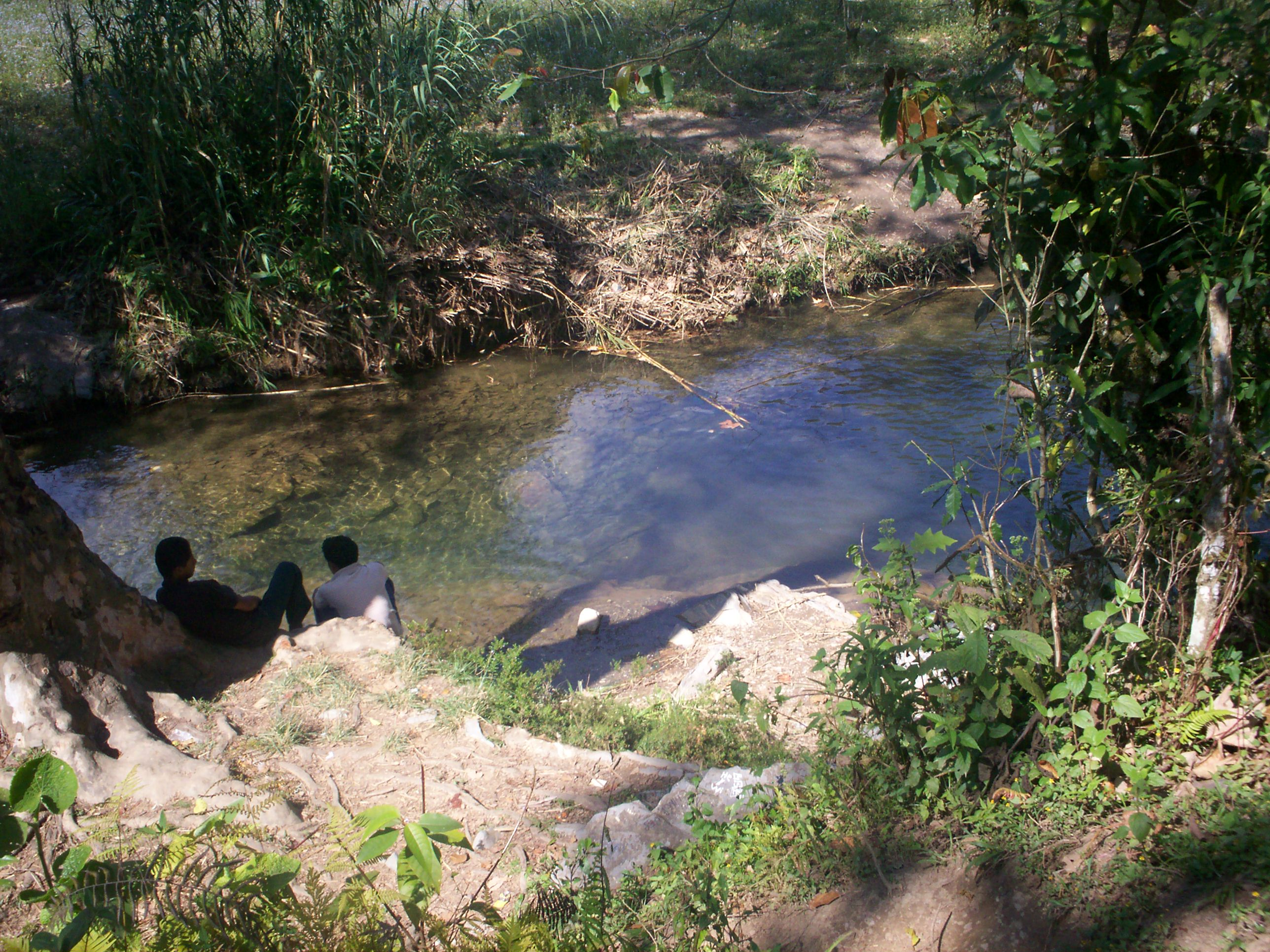
Petlapa River

The hydrology of Puebla is formed by three major river systems. One is based on the Balsas River, also known as the Atoyac, which originates with the melting runoff of the Halos, Telapón and Papagayo mountains along with those from the Iztaccihuatl volcano and waters from the Zahuapan River, which enters from Tlaxcala. This river receives further water from tributaries such as the Acateno, Atila, Amacuzac, Molinos and Cohetzala. The river has one major dam called Valsequllo or Manuel Avila Camacho. This river eventually flows west to the Pacific Ocean. The next system empties into the Gulf of Mexico and consists of the Pantepec, Cazones, Necaxa, Laxaxalpan, San Pedro/Zun, Zempoala, Apulco, Cedro Viejo, Salteros, Martínez de la Torre and other rivers on the east side of the state. This system has two major dams called the Necaxa and Mazatepec. The third is the closed Oriental Basin, with a large number of small lakes fresh water springs as well as some volcanically heated springs. The best known of these include Chignahuapan, Agua Azúl, Amalucan, Cisnaqullas, Garcicrespo, Almoloya and Rancho Colorado. Lakes include Chapulco, San Bernardino, Lagunas Epatlán, Ayutla, Almoloyan, Alchichica, Pahuatlán, Las Minas, Aljojuca and Tecuitlapa.

=== Climate ===
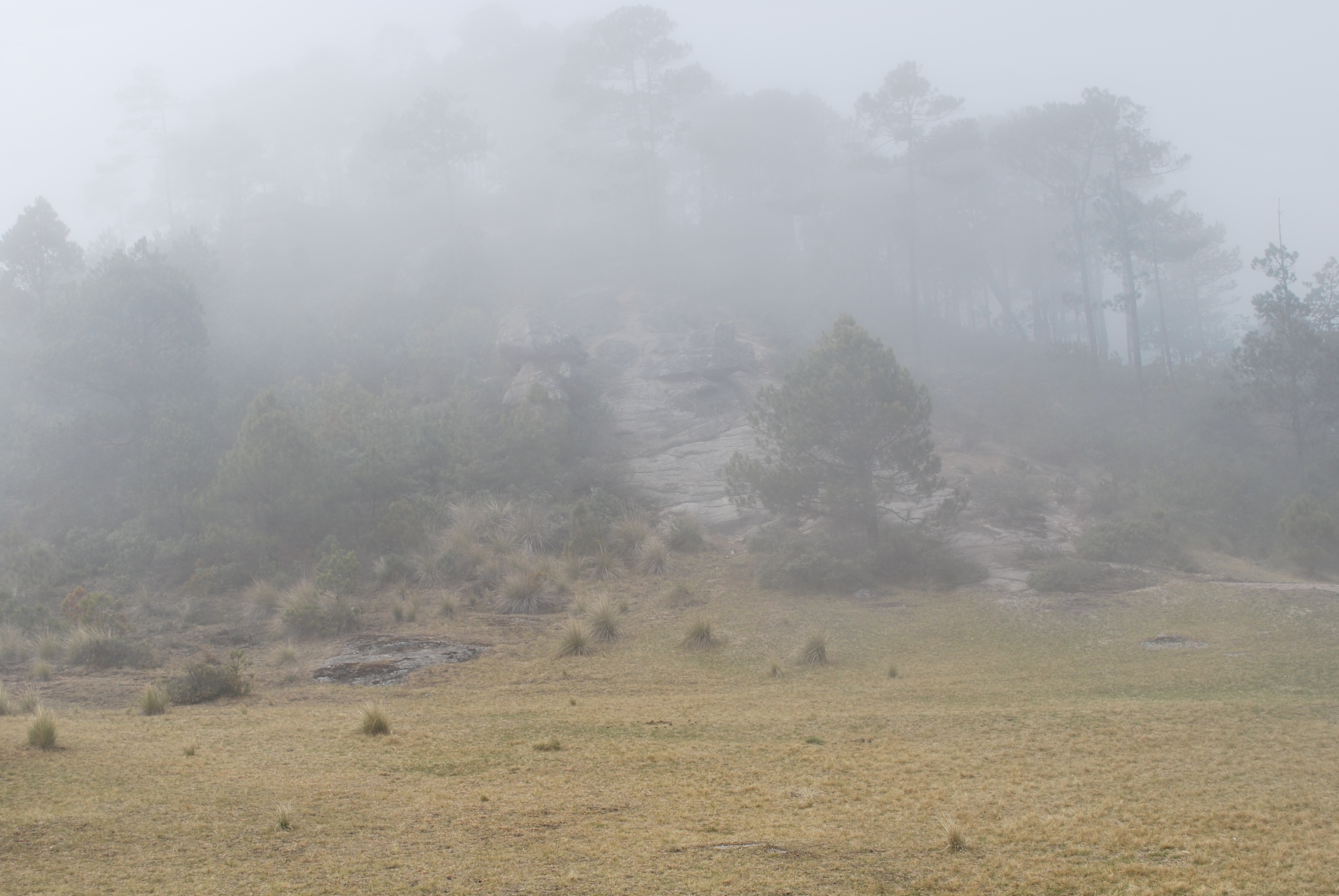
Fog in the mountains near Zacatlán

Puebla has many different climates owing to its range of altitudes. It has an average temperature of 16 °C (61 °F) but this varies greatly locally. There is a rainy season from May until October with an overall precipitation of 801 mm (31.54 in). The state has eleven different climate zones, but five predominate. The centre and south of the state has a temperate and semi-moist climate, with an average temperature of 15 °C (59 °F) and 858 mm (33.78 in) of rainfall. The southwest has a warm to hot and semi-moist climate with 830 mm (32.68 in) of precipitation and 22 °C (72 °F) average temperature. The north is also warm and hot, and additionally very wet; it has a 22 °C (72 °F) average temperature but with an average rainfall of 2,250 mm (88.58 in). The southeast is semi-dry with warm and temperate temperatures, having an average temperature of 22 °C (72 °F) and precipitation of 550 mm (21.65 in). The high volcano peaks have a cold climate.

=== Ecosystems ===
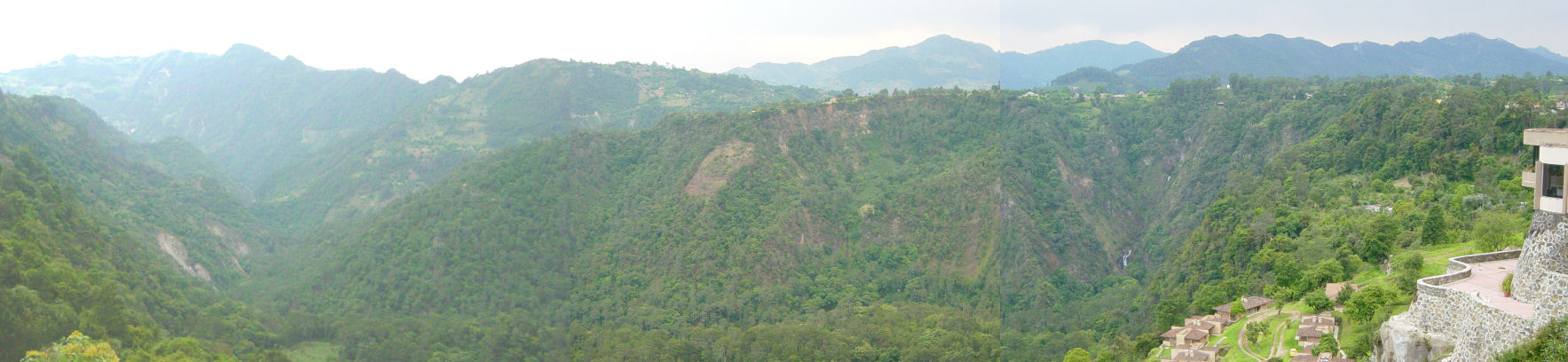
Ravines at Zacatlán

The state has three main ecosystems, tropical rainforests, forests in temperate and cold areas, and arid and semi-arid zones.

Tropical forests are divided into moist, semi-moist and dry forests. These can be found in the Huasteca Plateau, Chiconguiaco, Lagos y Volcánes de Anahuac, Sur de Puebla, Cordillera Costera del Sur, Sierras y Valles Guerrerenses, Sierras Orientales, Sierras Centrales de Oaxaca and Mixteca Alta. The most common species include Ceiba parviflora, Bursera simaruba, Cedrela odorata, Swietenia macrophylla, Spondias mombin, Brosimum alicastrum, Coccoloba barbadensis, Pithecellobium arboreum, Lysiloma divaricatum, Phoebe tampicensis, Acacia coulteri and Ficus spp. These forests are also exploited for wood and other products, including traditional handcrafts. Low growing plants are used to feed livestock. Little is known about the ecosystems of these forests, but it is known that these areas are important to the regulation of water in area rivers. Human activity has severely damaged over 32,000 hectares.

Tropical forests are divided by altitude. Upper forests are characterized by dense vegetation in fairly humid climates. The tree canopy reaches an average height of 15 meters. Not all species are evergreen, with a number losing leaves during the dry season. During the same season, a number of species also flower. For this reason, these forests never completely lose their color. Common species include Cedrela sp., Brosimum alicastrum, Heliocarpus spp., Calophyllum brasiliense, Zuelania guidonia and Ficus spp. Most forests of this type are located near the borders with Veracruz and Hidalgo. Tropical forests at lower altitudes are found in areas with median temperatures of over 20 C, and annual rainfall of between 800 and 1,200 mm (47.24 in). These areas often have a dry season of seven or eight months, and many of these forests will lose most or all of their leaves during this time. Common species include Bursera simaruba, Lysiloma divaricatum, Phoebe tampicensis, Acacia coulteri, Beaucarnea recurvata, Lysiloma acapulcensis and Zuelania guidonia.

Colder pine–oak forests can be found in the Huasteca Plateau, Sierra de Chiconquiaco, Lagos de Volcanos de Anáhuac, Sierras Orientales and Sierras Centrales de Oaxaca. These forests mostly consist of pines, oaks, oyamel fir and other conifers (Abies religiosa, Pinus pseudostrobus, Pinus attenuata, Pinus ayacahuite, Pinus leiophylla, Pinus patula, Pinus teocote, Quercus spp, Quercus rugosa, Alnus spp, Arbutus spp, Cupressus spp and Juniperus spp.). Much of these areas have been extensively logged and some areas are used to farm trees. These trees are used for wood, paper and other wood-derived products. Due to human activity over 107,000 hectares are considered to be severely damaged.

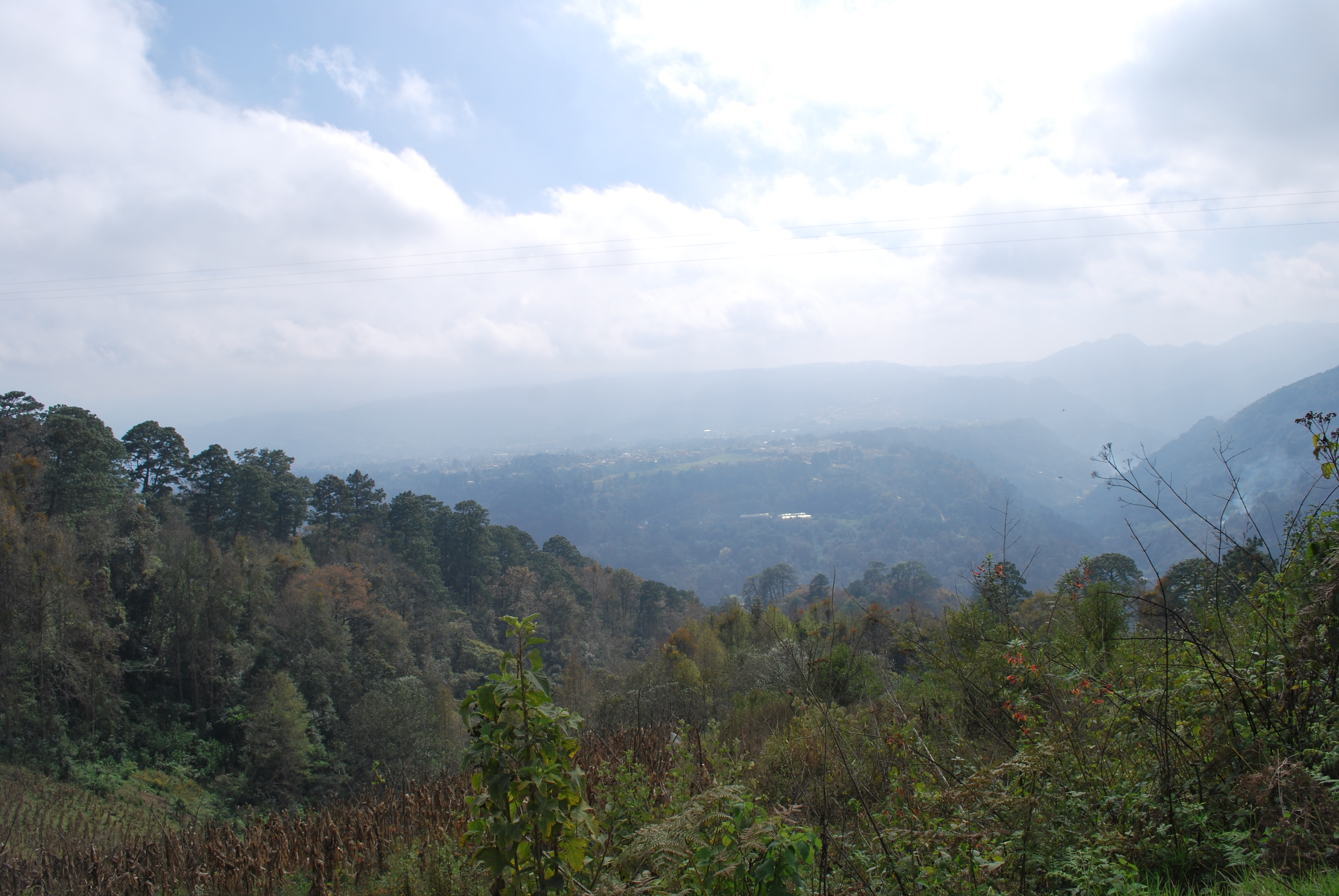
Pine forest near Huauchinango in the Sierra Norte

Temperate and cold area forests cover just under 22% of the surface of the state with various species of pine accounting for more than 80% of the trees. These are mostly found in the higher elevations of the mountains where the average temperature is around 15C and at heights of between 2,500 and 2,750masl. Above 3,000m Pinus hartwegii is dominant. Pine species which are the most economically valuable and include Pinus montezumae, Pinus pseudostrobus, Pinus ayacahuite, Pinus greggii, Pinus hartwegii, Pinus lawsonii, Pinus leiophylla, Pinus michoacana, Pinus oocarpa, Pinus patula and Pinus teocote. The second most common kind of forest is dominated by oyamel fir, often intermingling with pines and oaks. These forests are found at altitudes of between 2,500 and 3,600masl and with an average temperature of between 7 and 15C and annual precipitation of 1,000 mm (39.37 in). Forests with trees such as Juniperus spp., Pseudotsuga spp., Pseudotsuga menziesii, and Cupressus lindleyi can also be found.

The arid and semi arid area can be found in the Lagos y Volcanes de Anáhuac, Sur de Puebla, Cordillera Costera del Sur, Sierras y Valles Guerrerenses, Sierras Orientales and Sierras Centrales de Oaxaca. Types of vegetation often found includes mesquite, huizachal and agave, with species such as Agave spp, Yuca spp, Opuntia spp, Aristida spp., and Stipa spp. There is no forestry here but a number of plants are used for fibers, waxes, resins, handcrafts, medicine and a number are edible to both humans and livestock. Many of these arid areas subdivide into microclimates depending on minor variations in temperature and precipitation. Some areas, especially dry grasslands, have suffered overgrazing and soil erosion.

In the south, near Puebla's borders with Oaxaca and Guerrero are dry mountainous areas, some of which are completely devoid of vegetation, similar to African deserts. Other are populated only by the occasional cactus, with those belonging to the Fouquieria genus standing out on the landscape. Where there are arroyos, the vegetation changes drastically to include a wide variety of plants packed along a narrow strip. Other areas in this part of the state are semi-arid, home to a variety of plant and bird species.

=== Natural attractions ===
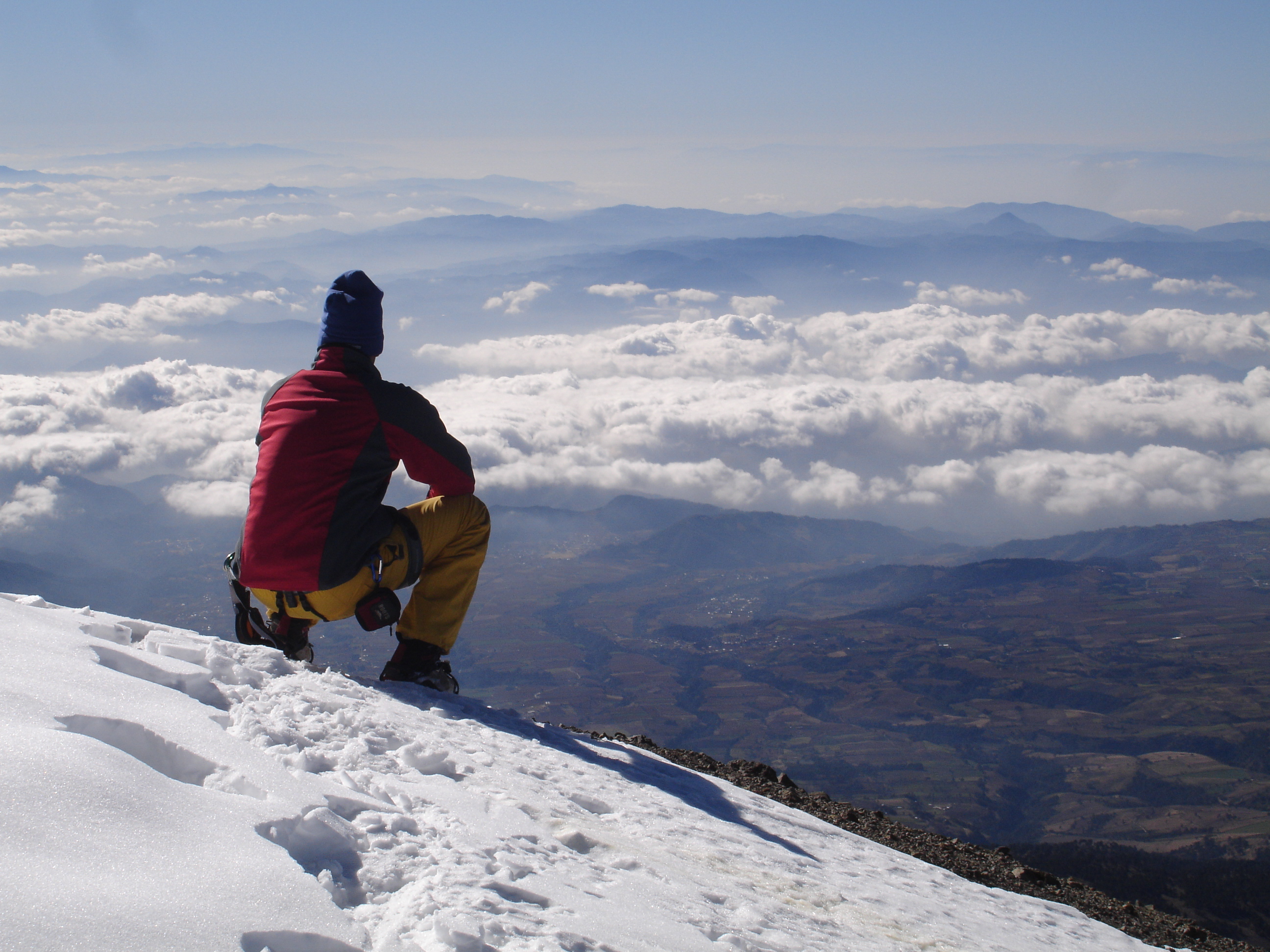
View from the summit of Pico de Orizaba

Natural attractions in the state include the Bosque Mesófilos de la Sierra Madre Oriental in the north of the state, Piedras Encimadas Valley, Izta-Popo Zoquiapan National Park, La Malinche National Park, and the Pico de Orizaba National Park. The best known wilderness area is the Izta-Popo National park, which the state shares with neighboring State of Mexico. It is located only 55 km (34 mi) west of the state capital and the two often snow covered volcanoes are easily visible from this area, and important to the state culturally. The park is an area protected by the federal government because of its biological diversity and considered to be the "lungs" of the area due to its forests. Access to the park, especially to the volcanoes themselves is more restricted than in the past due to past ecological damage. Even further restrictions are put into place when the Popocatepetl volcano is active. However, the park has numerous hiking and horse paths in the forests that cover the lower elevations. On the slopes, there are many small caves, which in pre-Hispanic times were often used for ceremonies.

The Sierra Madre Oriental, locally called the Sierra Norte, is a series of rugged mountains covered in abundant vegetation, which has had an isolating effect on the people here over the centuries. The Valle de Piedras Encimadas (Valley of the Stacked Stones) is located near the town of Zacatlán. It is really a series of small valleys covering 400 hectares filled with conifer forest. The attraction here are the stone formations which resemble stones stacked one over the other which take on numerous forms. Some have been said to resemble objects such as dogs, elephants, human heads and monsters. Most of the area is only accessible by foot or horseback.

In the center of the state, just before the land rises to the north to form the Sierra Norte, there is an area called the Oriental Basin filled with lakes, both with water and dry. The dry lakebeds contain water only during the rainy season, which runs from summer through fall. The two largest are Salado and Totocingo Lakes. The first is seven km long and two km wide and the second is larger. The largest "wet" lakes are Laguna Preciosa, Laguna Quechulac, Laguna de Atexcac and Laguna de Aijojuca.

== History ==
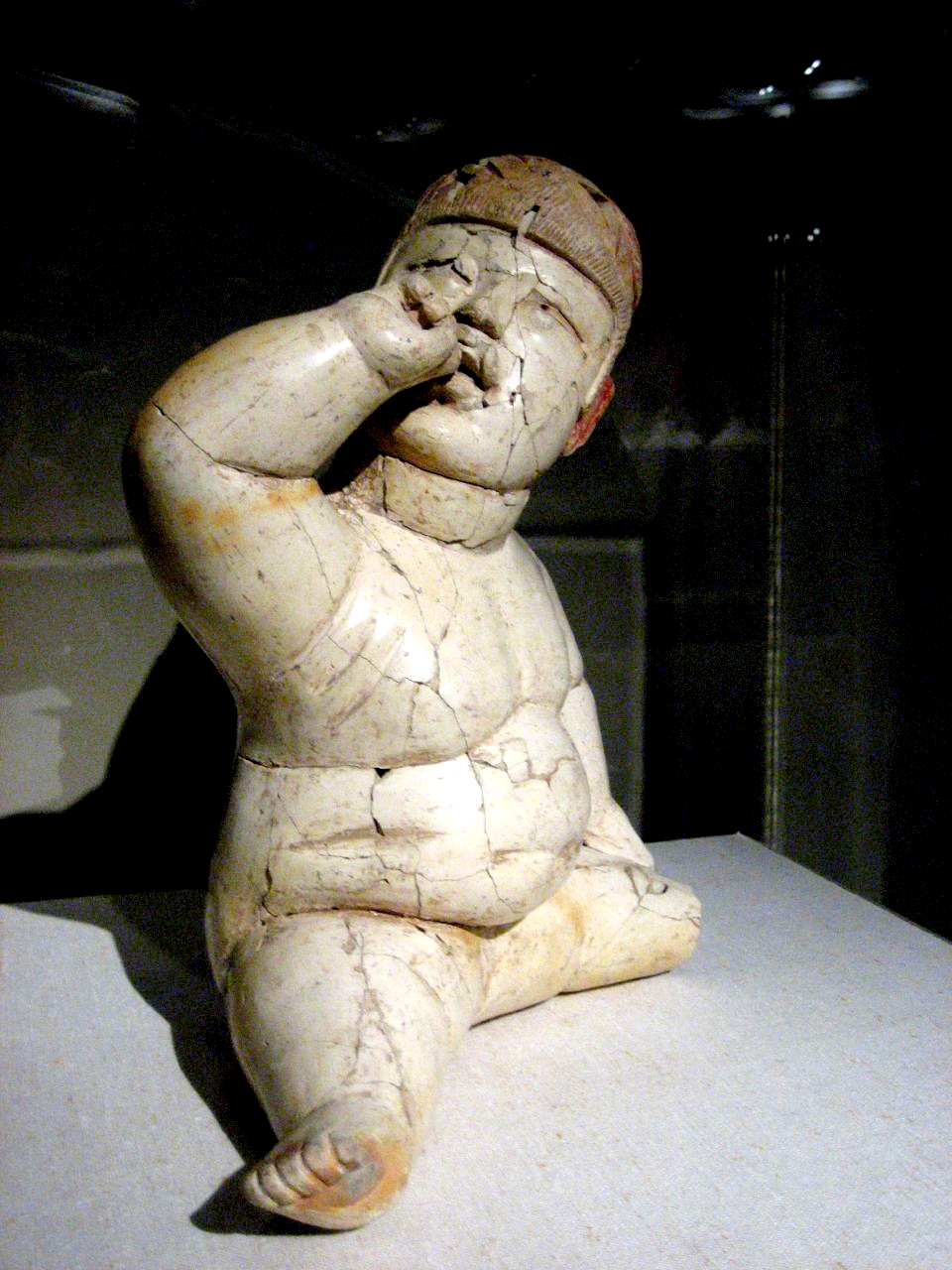
Olmec figurine of Las Bocas

=== Pre-Hispanic period ===
The territory of the state was one of the first in modern Mexico to be inhabited by humans. Most of the earliest settlements have been found in the valley of Tehuacán, with the oldest near the Agujereado Mountain, which dates back to 10,000 BCE. At this site the oldest sample of corn ever found in the world has been found, which dates back to 1500 BCE. Along with Agujereado Mountain, there are more than 450 prehistoric sites in the Tehuacan Valley alone. Stone tools date to between 6500 and 4900 BCE, and evidence of agriculture to 3500 and 2000 BCE in areas such as Aljojuca, Totimiuacan, Cholula and Izucar. By 900 BCE, there is ample evidence of the cultivation of corn, beans, squash, chili peppers and cotton. The rise of city states was established by 700 BCE.

By the Mesoamerican period, the area was inhabited by a number of ethnicities. The regions of Acatlán and part of Chiautla were dominated by the Mixtecs. Tepexi was dominated by the Popolocas. The central part of the state was dominated by the Olmec-Xicalancas and Nahuas, with strong cultural links to the Toltec-based culture at Cholula. The north was populated by the Totonacs, the Mazatecs and the Otomi, whose cultural center was in El Tajín. In the 14th century, Nonoalca ruler Xelhua, came to dominate almost all of the territory of Puebla. In the 15th century, Aztec domination took over the same area and more. Initially, the center and south areas were under the control of Tenochtitlan with Texcoco dominant in the north. Aztec domination continued until the Spanish Conquest.

=== Viceroyalty of New Spain (1535–1821) ===
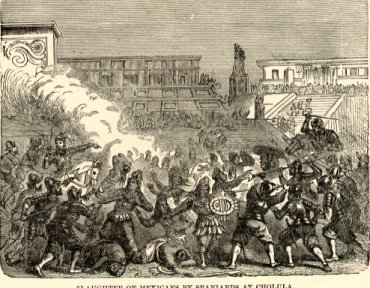
Massacre of Cholula

Hernán Cortés entered Puebla state in 1519, along with his indigenous allies from Veracruz, on his way to Tlaxcala. The Spanish takeover of the Puebla area was relatively easy. Many of the peoples here were under Aztec domination and saw the foreigners as a way to escape. One notable exception was the city of Cholula. While negotiating with the city's leaders, Cortés was told of a plot to attack him and his men. Cortés ordered his army to commit the Massacre of Cholula on 12 October 1519. This act terrified those who opposed the Spanish and they submitted. In 1520, after his initial defeat in Tenochtitlan (La Noche Triste) Hernán Cortés founded a Spanish settlement at Tepeaca, and took areas such as Huaquechula and Itzocan. Many natives leaders then provided men and supplies for the conquest of Tenochtitlan in 1521, and later to go with Pedro de Alvarado to Guatemala. Local indigenous governments survived in the very early colonial period, subject to the Spanish. These included Tuchpa, Tzicoac, Metztitlán, Tlapacoyan, Atotonilco, Tlatlaquitepec, Huaxtepec, Tepeaca, Tlacozautitlán, Quiauhteopan, Yoaltepec, Teotitlán del Camino, Cuautochco and Coixtlahuacan.

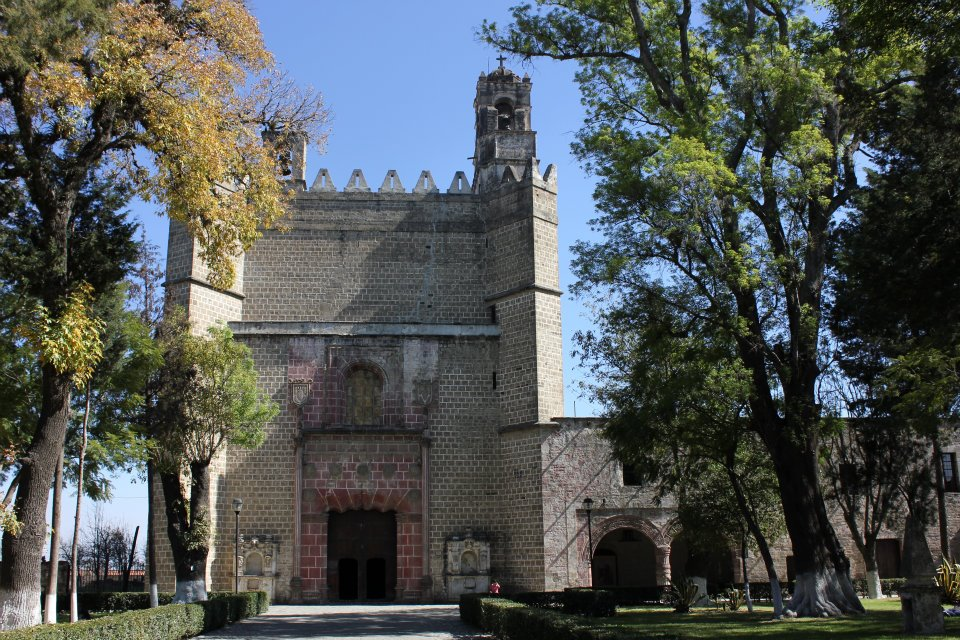
The Convento de San Miguel Arcángel in Huejotzingo, part of the Monasteries on the slopes of Popocatépetl.

The origins of the modern state lie in the founding of the city of Puebla in the Cuetlaxcoapan Valley in 1531 by Toribio de Benavente and Juan de Salmerón. The city was laid out by Hernando de Elgueta, marking out residential areas, commercial areas etc. The city received its royal seal in 1532 but flooding forced the settlement to move across the San Francisco River and start over that same year. The city's (and now state's) seal was granted in 1538. The city of Puebla was created to secure the route between Mexico City and the port of Veracruz, and was initially populated by soldiers and those who made a living by providing shelter and supplies to travelers between the two cities. However, it soon became the economic and cultural center of the valley areas between the Valley of Mexico and the Gulf Coast, as it provided a starting point for Spanish settlement. The area's economy expanded rapidly as many Europeans and indigenous decided to settle permanently, with the settlement of Puebla reaching city status in 1532 with the name of Ciudad de los Angeles.

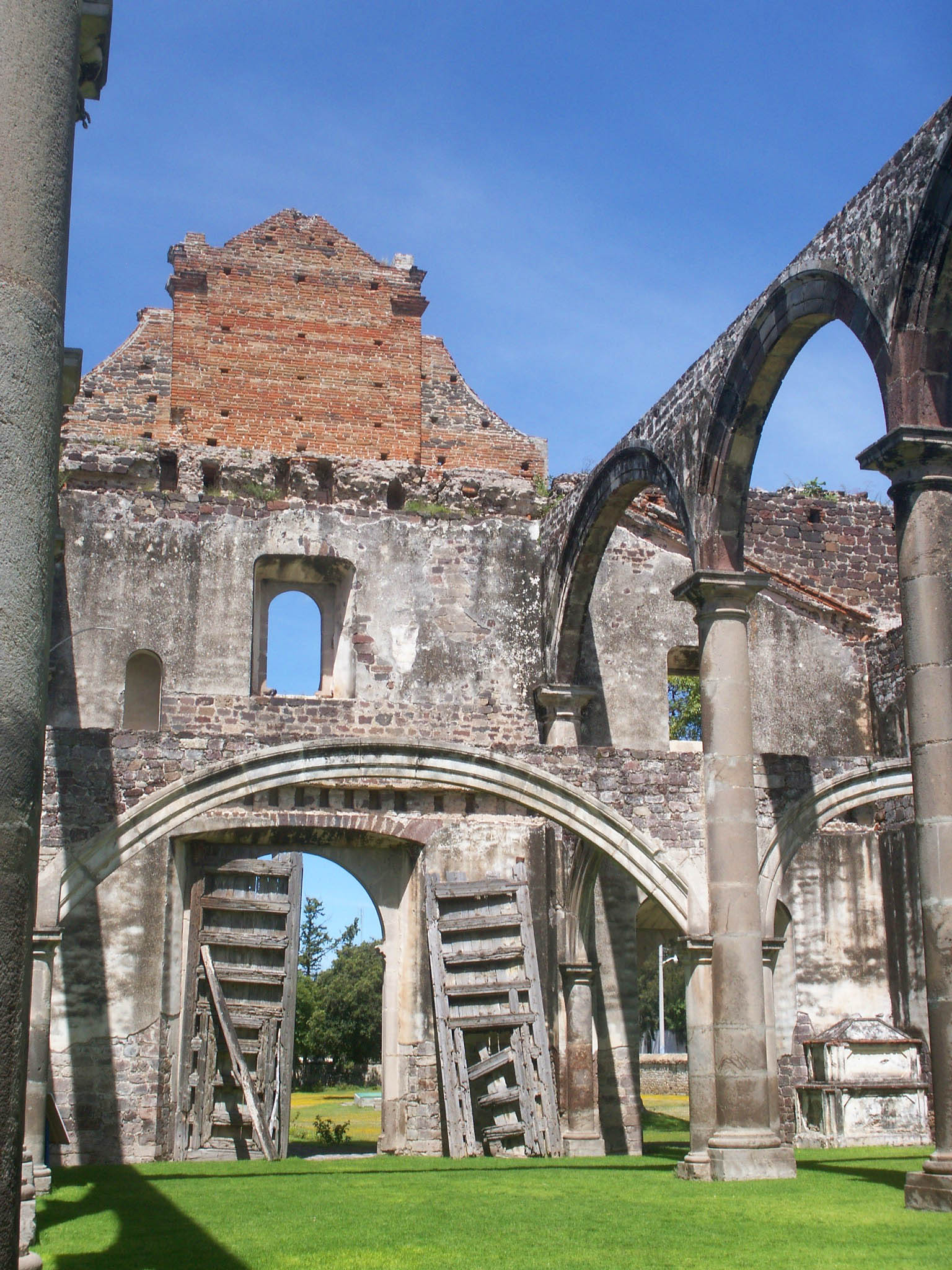
Former Franciscan monastery at Tecali de Herrera

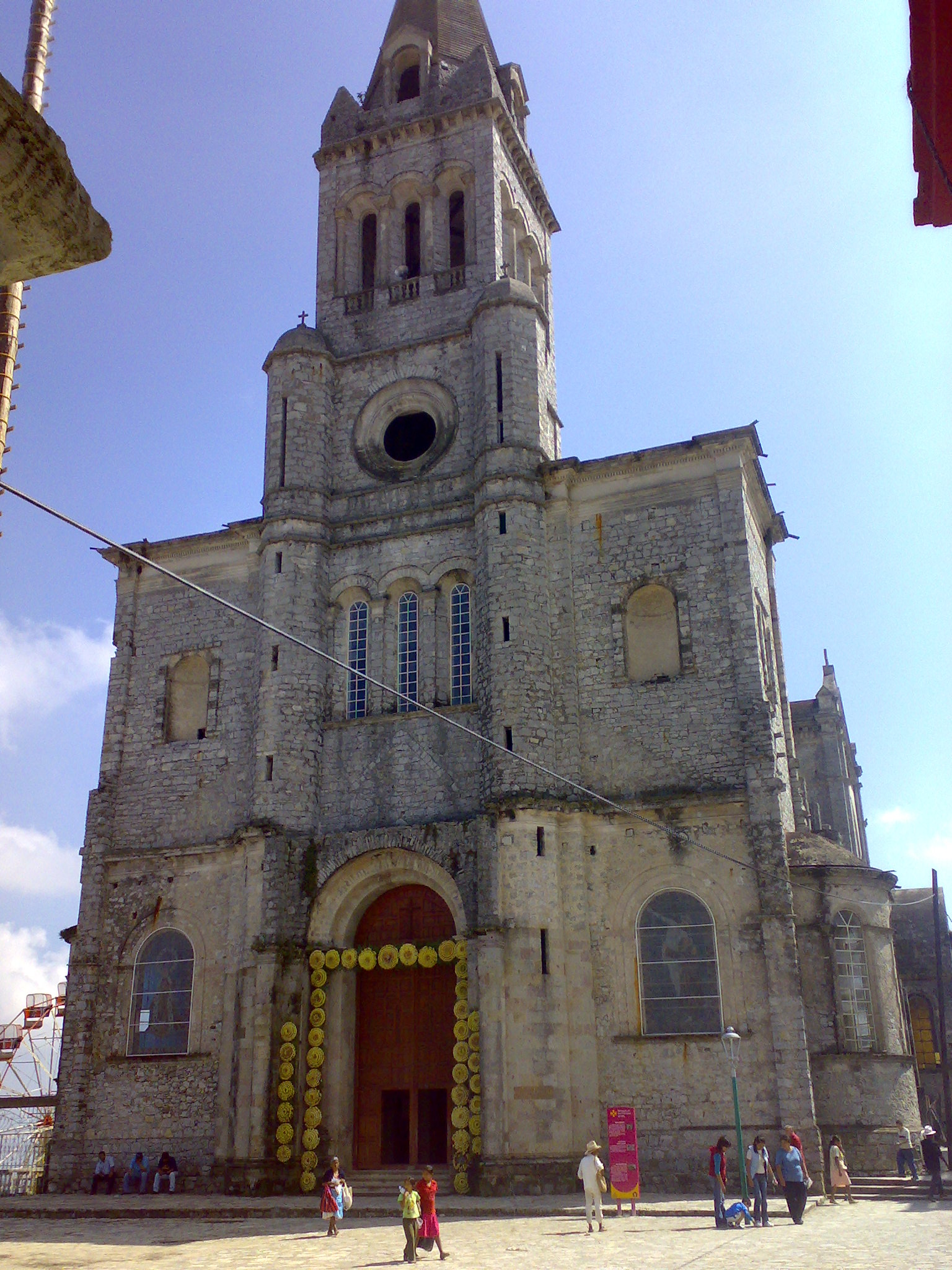
Cuetzalan del Progreso

The Franciscans were in charge of the evangelization process in the state, starting from 1524, when they founded the monastery of Huejotzingo. Between 1540 and 1560, they founded others such as those in Tecamachalco, Quecholac, Tecali, Calpan, Cuautinchán, Zacatlán, Cholula, Huaquechula, Tepeaca, Tehuacán, Xalpa and Coatepec. The Augustinians arrived next, constructing monasteries in Chiautla, Chietla, Huatlatlauca, Tlapa, Xicotepec and Papaloticpac. The last of the evangelists were the Dominicans, who built monasteries at Izúcar de Matamoros, Tepapayeca, Huehuatlán and Tepexi. The bishopric was established in 1526. Initially, the seat was in the Yucatán, but it was eventually moved to Tlaxcala, then to Puebla by 1550. Eventually, its extension included the current states of Tlaxcala and Puebla during much of the colonial period.

In 1783, the royal government in Spain divided New Spain into "intendencias" or provinces, one of which was centered on the city of Puebla. The first governor of Puebla was Manuel de Flon, Count of La Cadena. Initially, this intendencia included Tlaxcala, but it was separated out in 1793. Other parts were eventually separated out into other provinces/states such as Mexico, Guerrero and Veracruz.

=== Post-independence ===
During the Mexican War of Independence, the city of Puebla remained loyal to the viceroy in Mexico City, sending troops to defend it at the Battle of Monte de las Cruces against Miguel Hidalgo y Costilla. Ecclesiastical authorities in the Cathedral excommunicated insurgent priests and battles took place in Izúcar and Chiautla. Most of the south of the state, especially Izucar and the Sierra Mixteca were firmly in insurgent hands. Control then bypassed the capital and reached the more northern settlements of Tehuacan and Atlixco. After Independence, the first governor of the state was Carlos García Arriaga in 1821. The first state congress was seated in 1824, with the first state constitution adopted the same year. The new state was divided initially into 21 parts. The Spanish were expelled from the state in 1827. In 1849, the state was reorganized into eight departments and 162 municipalities and again in 1895 with 21 districts and 180 municipalities.

During the rest of the 19th century, the state developed economically through industry. The first mechanized textile mill was established in 1831, soon followed by 17 others in the city of Puebla. Progress was interrupted by Santa Anna's siege of the city in 1845 and two years later when the Americans under General Winfield Scott took the city on their way to Mexico City. The Americans left three years later at the end of the war.

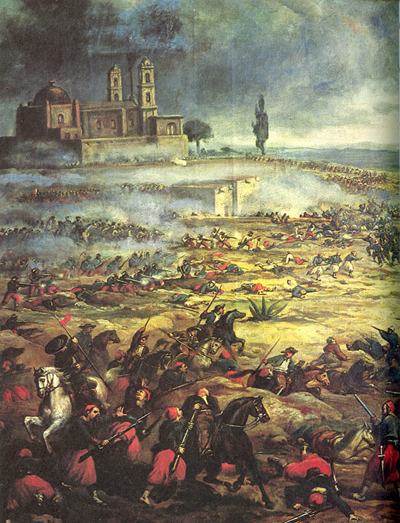
Mexican cavalry charge at the Battle of Puebla

Much of the rest of the century was occupied with civil strife such as the insurrection of Francisco Ortega against the federal government, the Reform War and the French Intervention. The last provoked the Battle of Puebla on 5 May 1862, when 6,000 French troops attacked the forts named Loreto and Guadalupe outside of the city of Puebla, but they were repelled by forces under Ignacio Zaragoza. Zaragoza died some months after this battle, and he would be later honored by having his name added to that of the city. However, less than a year later, the city would be taken and shortly after, Emperor Maximilian I of Mexico would be installed. However, his rule would be brief and the French, along with their conservative Mexican allies, were expelled from the state in 1867.

From this time to the Mexican Revolution, a number of important infrastructure projects were undertaken. One was the Puebla-Veracruz rail line in 1873 and the Escuela Normal para Profesores (Teachers' College) in 1879. In 1907, a hydroelectric plant was built in Necaxa. However, the economic policies of this area caused widespread unrest, beginning with workers' strikes. Directly against the regime of Porfirio Díaz was the Club Antireeleccionista (Anti-reelection Club) headed by Aquiles Serdán in 1909. In November 1910, after long government surveillance, troops attacked the Serdán house in Puebla killing Aquiles and his brother Máximo. For this reason, the state claims one of the first battles of the Mexican Revolution.

=== Following the Mexican Revolution ===
In 1912, the Liberation Army of the South or Zapatistas took over a number of communities in the state. In 1914, they were challenged by forces loyal to Venustiano Carranza, which occupied the capital briefly. However, the Zapatistas would hold power for the rest of the war. Under the 1917 Constitution, the state was reestablished with 222 municipalities. One of the last skirmishes of the war occurred in Aljibes, Puebla in May 1920 when forces of Álvaro Obregón attacked those of Carranza as he was headed to Veracruz. Carranza was assassinated in Tlaxcalantongo in the Sierra Norte de Puebla soon thereafter.

The 1920s immediately after the war was marked by instability. The governorship changed hands frequently with resistance to whoever was in power from other parts of the state. Despite this, the Universidad de Puebla was established by Maximino Ávila Camacho during this decade. True political stability would not come until the governorship of Gustavo Díaz Ordaz in 1942.

=== Modern times ===
Since the Mexican Revolution, the city of Puebla and its suburbs are one of the most industrialized areas in Mexico, with the metropolitan area ranked fourth in size. Its position near both Mexico City and the Gulf coast continues to be an advantage. However, modern development of the city area has been restricted to outside the city center, in order to preserve its traditional look. This historic center was named a World Heritage Site in 1987, with the Biblioteca Palafoxiana named as part of the Memory of the World Programme in 2005. Today, Puebla's economic development is centered on its capital. This capital is part of the megalopolis centered on Mexico City.

In 1977, the center of the city of Puebla was named a "Zone of Historic Monuments". The same area was later named a World Heritage Site in 1987. In 1979, Puebla was the scene of one of Pope John Paul II's early papal visits outside Italy to Mexico for that year's CELAM conference over three months after his election and papal inauguration.

In 1998, the state was declared in a state of emergency due to 122 forest fires with affected 2,998 hectares of land over two weeks. Many of the fires were started by fires on agricultural lands and the extremely dry conditions made the fires out of control.

The 1999 Tehuacán earthquake did major damage to much of state, especially many of its colonial era churches, and the colonial buildings of the historic center of the city of Puebla. The state of Puebla was declared a disaster area.

In the 2000s, organizations such as Reporters Sans Frontieres (RSF) have accused state governmental officials of restricting and suppressing the press. Some of the threats against reporters have included false arrests and death threats.

More than two years after the 2017 Puebla earthquake when 621 buildings—mostly 16th to 19th-century churches—were damaged in the state, 46 have been restored, 88 are in process, and 380 have not been restored at all.

== Demographics ==
=== Largest cities ===
Largest cities or towns in Puebla Source:
Rank		Municipality	Pop.
1	Puebla	Puebla	1,434,062
2	Tehuacán	Tehuacán	248,716
3	Cholula de Rivadavia	San Pedro Cholula	87,897
4	Atlixco	Atlixco	86,690
5	Amozoc de Mota	Amozoc de Mota	77,106
6	San Martín Texmelucan	San Martín Texmelucan	75,518
7	Teziutlán	Teziutlán	58,699
8	Huauchinango	Huauchinango	56,206
9	Tlaxcalancingo	San Pedro Cholula	54,517
10	Izúcar de Matamoros	Izúcar de Matamoros	43,006

Historical population
Year	Pop.	±%
1895	992,426	—
1900	1,021,133	+2.9%
1910	1,101,600	+7.9%
1921	1,024,955	−7.0%
1930	1,150,425	+12.2%
1940	1,294,620	+12.5%
1950	1,625,830	+25.6%
1960	1,973,837	+21.4%
1970	2,508,226	+27.1%
1980	3,347,685	+33.5%
1990	4,126,101	+23.3%
1995	4,624,365	+12.1%
2000	5,076,686	+9.8%
2005	5,383,133	+6.0%
2010	5,779,829	+7.4%
2015	6,168,883	+6.7%
2020	6,583,278	+6.7%

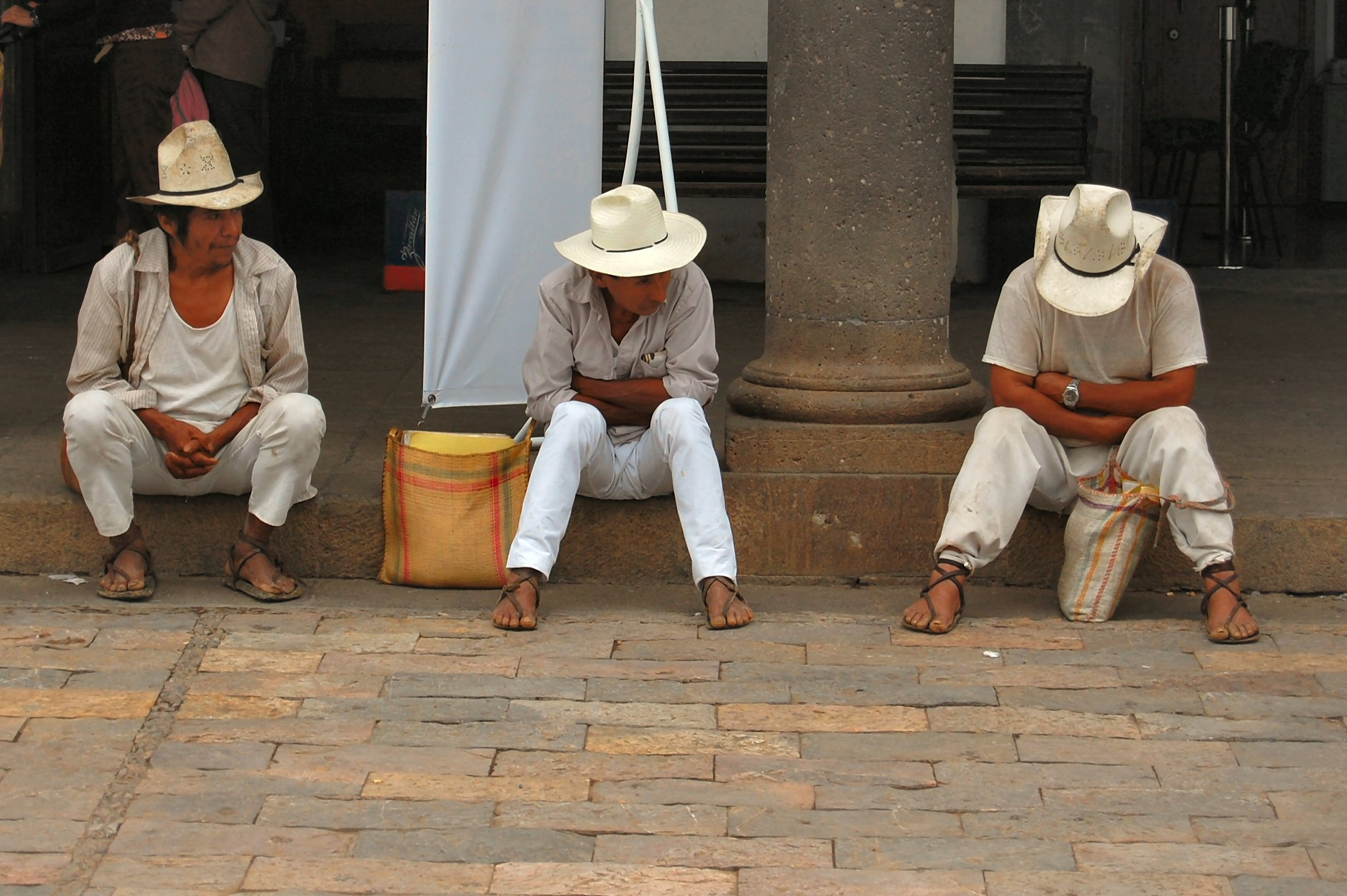
Nahuas in Zacatlán

In 2005, the state had a population of 5,383,133 according to the INEGI census, ranking fifth in the country. Over 93% of the state's population identifies as Roman Catholic with 4.4% identifying as Protestant or Evangelical.

In 1921, Puebla had the second largest population, after Oaxaca, of purely indigenous people according to the national census. Since then, the official census has eliminated categories for race, counting only those who speak an indigenous language. In 2000, an attempt was made to count indigenous ethnicities, regardless of language spoken. This count ranked Puebla as fifth with a total population of 957,650. However, according to the 2005 census, there were 548,723 people who spoke an indigenous language. According to a 2000 census, Censo General de Población y Vivienda, Puebla has the highest number of Nahuatl speakers over 5 years of age. There are 416,968 speakers making up about 8.21% of the population of the state.

The state has five major indigenous ethnic groups: the Nahuas, the Totonacs, the Mixtecs, the Popolocas and the Otomi. The state has two well-defined areas in which indigenous peoples still maintain many ancient traditions, rites, and customs. These two regions are called the Sierra Norte in the north and the Sierra Negra in the south. In these areas, these traditions, and the agriculture they are dependent on, have survived because industrialization has not penetrated the rugged landscape.

The Sierra Norte, especially the municipalities of Cuetzalan, Pahuatlán, Huehuetlán el Grande and Teziutlán, are dominated by the Nahuas, Totonacas and Otomi. There is also a small region locally called the Sierra Negra in which there are communities of Popolocas, Nahuas and Mazatecos, especially in the municipality of Eloxochitlán, Tlacotepec and part of the city of Tehuacán.

The Mixtec people who live in the south of Puebla are part of an ethnic group which are still the dominant indigenous group in an area that stretches over Puebla, Oaxaca and the mountains of Guerrero. They are the fourth largest indigenous group in Mexico. The Sierra Mixteca region in Puebla is part of the Mixteca Baja region, which crosses into parts of Oaxaca as well. In the Mesoamerican period, the Mixtecs of Puebla dominated further north than they do now and archeologists classify "Mixteca-Puebla" art as distinct from other Mixtec arts and crafts. There are an estimated 6,700 Mixtecs living in Puebla, however, many have emigrated out of traditional Mixtec areas into other parts of the state, Mexico City and even the United States to work.

A 2020 genetic study sampling 2,827 individuals from the state of Puebla found that the general population is of predominantly Indigenous descent, finding an average of 72.1% Indigenous ancestry, 21.1% European ancestry, and 6.7% African.

According to the 2020 Census, 1.73% of Puebla's population identified as Black, Afro-Mexican, or of African descent.

== Economy ==
=== General economy ===
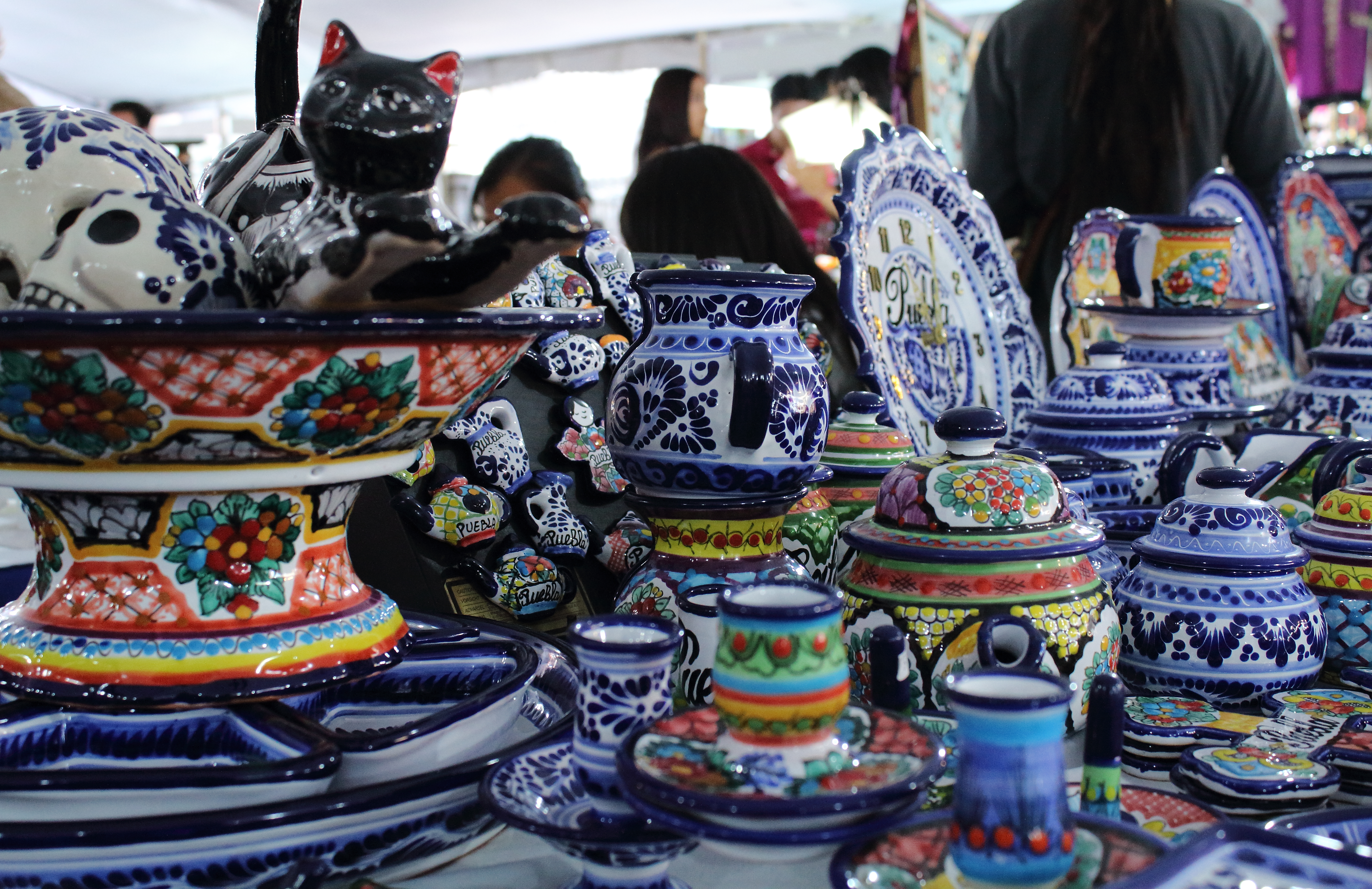
Crafts of Puebla, México

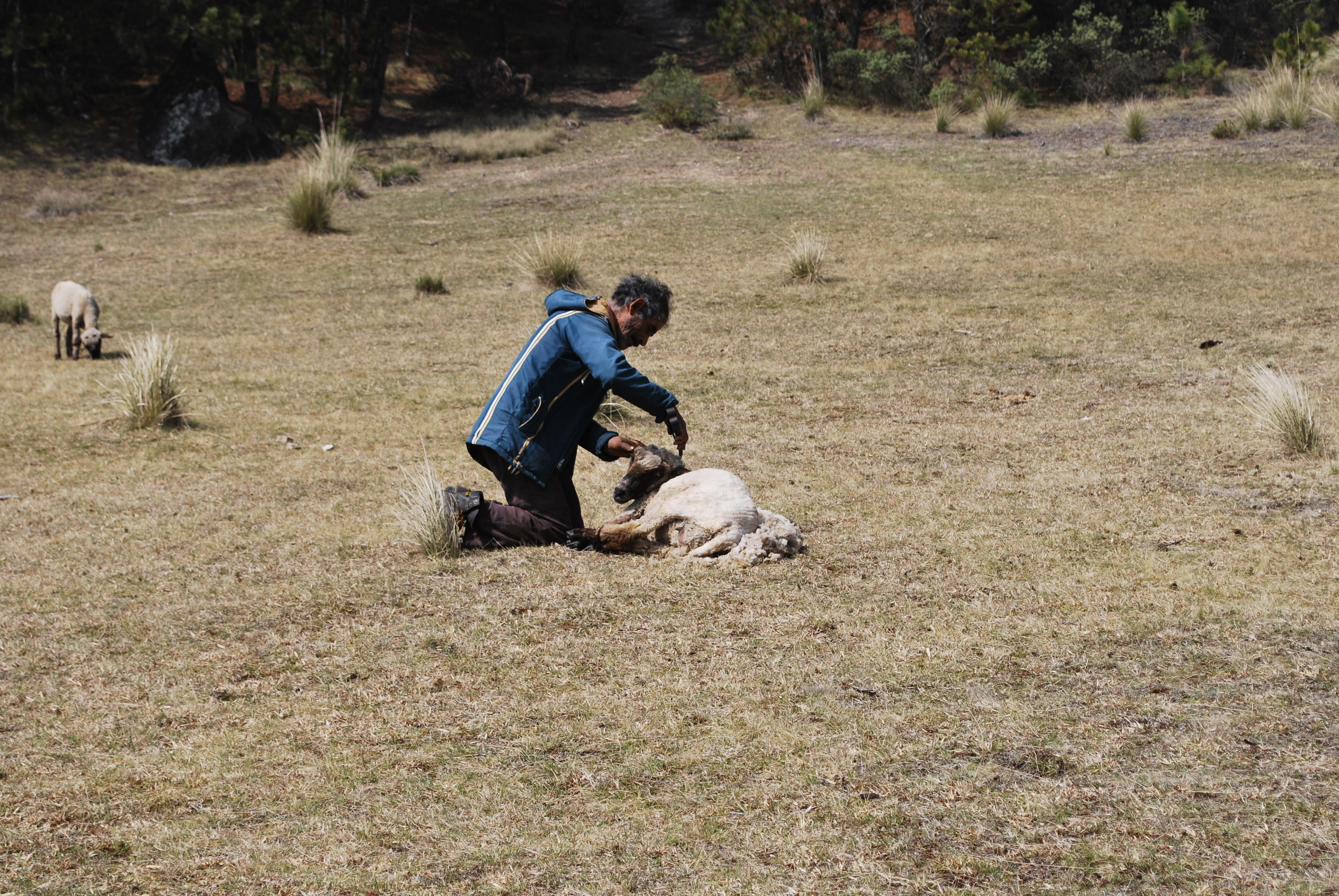
Shearing a sheep near Zacatlán

The state is divided into seven socioeconomic regions for planning purposes: Region I-Huauchinango, Region II – Teziutlán, Region III Ciudad Serdán, Region IV San Pedro Cholula, Region V – Puebla, Region VI Izúcar de Matamoros and Region VII Tehuacán.

The state was a diverse economic base supporting industries such as textiles, tourism, agribusiness, storage, medical services, furniture making and logistics services in clusters.(promotedor) In 2010, Standard & Poor's reconfirmed the state's 'mxA+' rating with a stable outlook due to the state's finances. The state's economy grew at a rate of 4.5% from 2003 to 2007, above the national average of 3.9%. Since then, economic growth has slowed but less than in other parts of Mexico. Its gross domestic product accounts for 3.4% of the country's total.

It is one of Mexico's most industrialized states.

However, almost all of the state's development has been centered on the capital city and the surrounding areas. This has caused a wide economic gap between rich and poor and between the city areas and the rural areas, with much of the state lacking investment by the government (infrastructure) or by private interests. This has led the United Nations to rank the state as the seventh most underdeveloped in the country, despite the industry in the Puebla City area in 2006–2007, with areas lacking basic services such as health, water and education along with high unemployment. The state is even ranked lower for these than Lebanon, Cuba and Bosnia. The UN blames poor government policies and corruption for much of the state's poverty.

According to several NGO's, such as the Consejo Nacional de Evaluación de la Política de Desarrollo Social (Coneval), and Marcos Gutiérrez Barrón, professor of economics at the Universidad Popular Autónoma del Estado de Puebla, Puebla has the third highest level of poverty in the country. This ranking takes into account factors such as income per capita, housing, educational opportunities, food supply and family cohesion. As much as two-thirds of the state's population or about 3.5 million live under the poverty line. The state's Secretaria de Desarrollo Social (Secretariat of Social Development) increased its budget in 2008 to 757 million pesos. Ten of the state's municipalities are ranked among the poorest in the country.

Puebla is a state where migrant workers both head to and leave from. Most incoming workers are indigenous from the states of Oaxaca and Guerrero, according to a study done by the National Indigenous Institute and the United Nations. Most of these emigrants are Mixtecs from the south of the state, which head to areas such as Mexico City and the north of the country either seasonally or permanently. Many also head to the United States to work illegally. The migration situation has caused the population to drop in a number of areas in the state. The UN states that the main reason for emigration is the lack of local economic development especially in rural and indigenous areas.

=== Agriculture and forestry ===
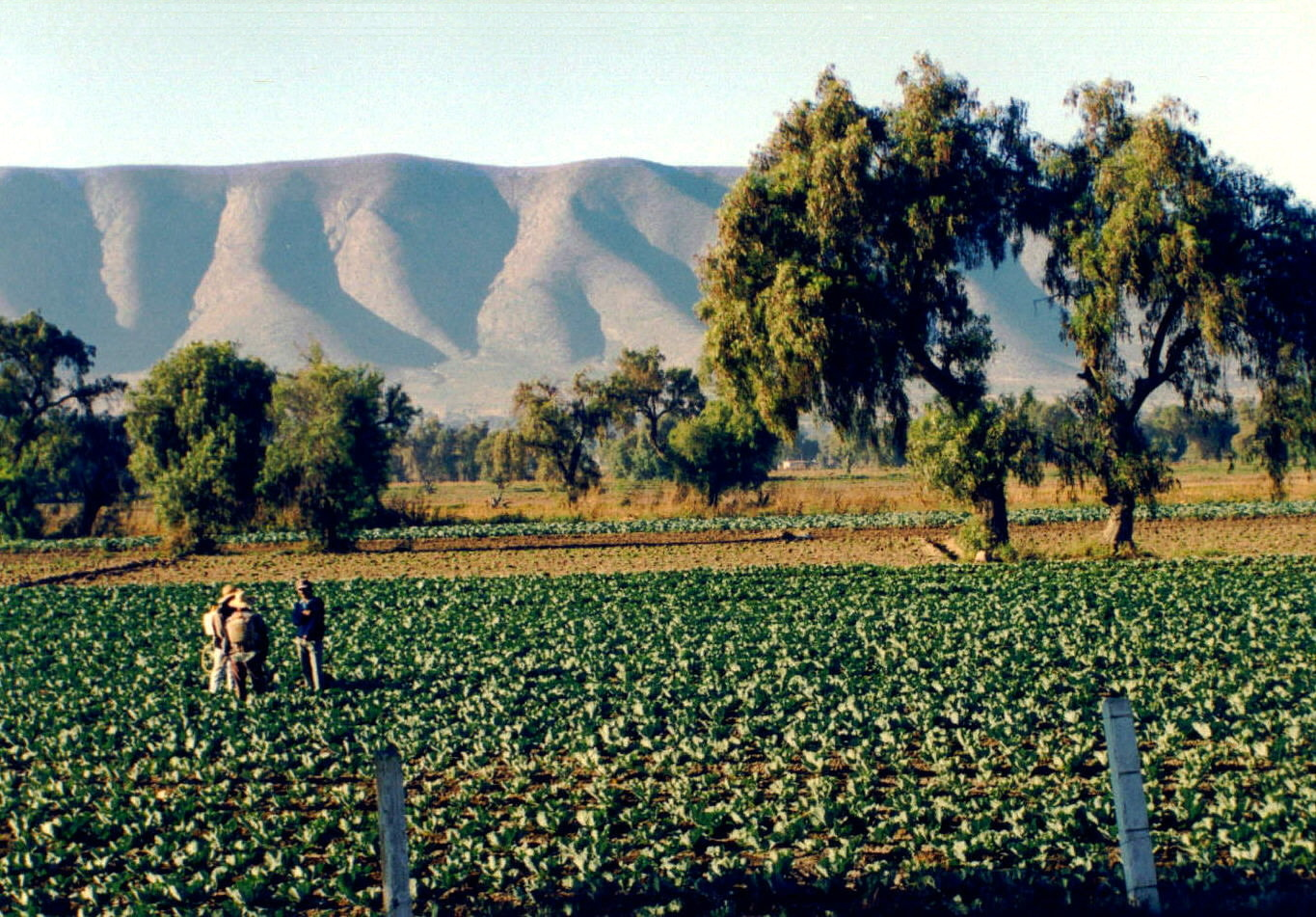
Farmers in a field in Puebla

Thirty seven percent of the population is employed in agriculture, livestock and fishing. Agricultural units cover 2,233,897 hectares in rural areas of the state. Just over fifty percent is dedicated to the growing of crops, 46.5% to pasture, 2.6% is forest and .8% is wild vegetation. Agriculture is the most important economic activity of the rural areas, but it is mostly limited to the rainy season from June to October, as there are few facilities for irrigation. This limits the sector's growth potential significantly. Due to lack of investment only 11% of the state's arable land is irrigated. Seventy two percent of farmland is privately own with the rest belonging to ejidos or other types of communal ownership. The municipalities with the most cultivated land are Chignahuapan, Chalchicomula de Sesma, Tlachichuca and Zacapoaxtla.

The most important activities include production of domestic fowl (eggs and meat), which accounts for 37%, cattle (dairy and meat) at 12%, grains (90% corn) and pork at 10% each, vegetables (tomatillos, onions, carrots, tomatoes, and squash) at 8% and fruit (oranges, limes, cactus pear, apples, avocados and peaches) at 4%. Other important crops include beans, animal feed, alfalfa and sugar cane. Most crops are grown in the municipalities of Hueytamalco, Francisco Z. Mena, Venustiano Carranza, Xicotepec and Jalpan. Most crops, especially corn, are grown on relatively small farms, communal fields and family plots, but perennial crops such as rubber trees, coffee and citrus from are mostly grown on large plantations. The most important livestock in the state are cattle, pigs and domestic fowl. Cattle are prevalent in the municipalities of Francisco Z. Mena, Venustiano Carranza, Jalpan, Hueytamalco and Chiautla de Tapia. Pigs are mostly found in Tehuacán, Ajalpan, Tepanco de López, Tecamachalco and Yehualtepec. The entire state ranks first in the production of domestic fowl with most being produced in the municipalities of Ajalpan, Tehuacán, Tecamachalco, Tepanco de López and Tochtepec. Other livestock raised include goats, sheep and horses.

Other production of primary materials includes forest products and fish. Over 93% of the tree species exploited in the state are conifers mostly cut for wood production. In 2007, the annual production of wood products had risen to 244,803 cubic metres (8,645,136 cu ft). Most forestry occurs in the municipalities of Chignahuapan, Tetela de Ocampo, Vicente Guerrero, Zacatlán and Huauchinango. Fish are both caught wild and farmed and mostly concentrate on species such as carp, trout and mojarra. Most are harvested in the state's dams and lakes, which cover a surface area of 6,500 hectares.

=== Industry and mining ===
The state has been an important industrial center since colonial times, mostly known for the production of textiles and pottery, both of which continue to be made. Today, industries of various types, along with mining and construction employ about twenty five percent of the state's population. More than 150,000 small and medium-sized factories operate in the state, providing 60% of the state's GDP. Most industry in the state in concentrated in and around the capital. The most important industries are in metals, chemicals, pharmaceuticals, electronic items and textiles. Textiles produced in the state mostly involve thread, machinery, knitted items and woven fabrics. Moreover, the first and one of the biggest textile factory in Mexico and in Latinamerica, The "La Constancia Mexicana Factory", was built in capital of Puebla. Two important employers are Hylsa and the Volkswagen plant, both in the Puebla area.

Two important industries are automotive and agribusiness. The automotive sector is important for the state as a leading manufacturer of both automobiles and automobile parts. Some of the businesses located in the state include Denso México, Arvin Meritor de México, Mabe, Leoni, Hyundai-Kia Motors, Coramex Company and Forteq. Industry related to agriculture consists of both producing products needed by farmers and processing agricultural produce. Some of these companies include Nestle de México, Pasan, Chocolatera Moctezuma, Sabormex, Big Cola, Bomba Energy, Ochoa Comercial, Grupo Pepsico, Compañía Topo Chico, Red Bull, Grupo Bimbo, Unifoods, Novamex, The Coca-Cola Company, Supermercados Gigante, Soriana, La Costeña and Jugos del Valle.

There are nine state and four federal programs targeting small and medium-sized producers, which provide training, consulting, trademarks and other services. Some programs target specific industries such as software. One focus of the state is to promote technology based industries which produced high-value products. There are eleven industrial parks and other special industry zones for this purpose. Another area identified for improvement is higher education, to produce graduates to work in these kinds of industries. Commercial events include the Exintex International Exhibition, which is held in the state each year and attracts textile manufacturers from states such as Morelos, Tlaxcala, Tamaulipas, Guanajuato, Querétaro and Aguascalientes as well as the cities of Guadalajara and Mexico City.

Mining produces calcite, marble, calcium oxide, onyx, and lime. The most important mining processing concerns are Calera Santa Ma. S.A, Marmiparquet S.A, Química Sumex S.A de C.V and Yacimientos de Travertino S.A., and the sector employs about 270,000 workers.

=== Handicrafts ===
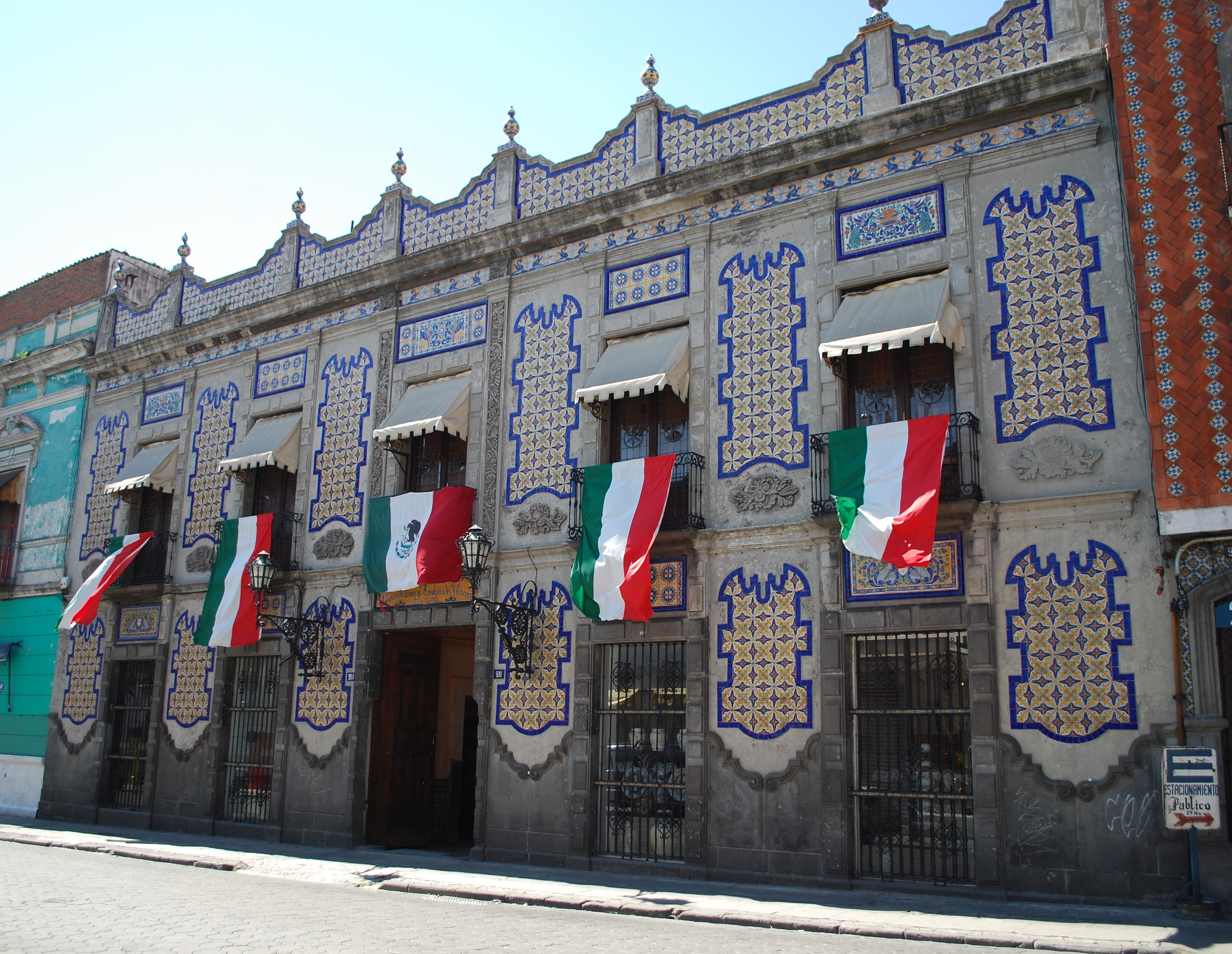
Uriarte Talavera pottery workshop in Puebla, Mexico

Talavera pottery is the state's best known craft. This pottery is a type of maiolica, which was introduced into Spain by the Arabs, and into Mexico by the Spanish. Talavera is considered to be the finest of Mexico's pottery traditions, which is still made with the same techniques as in the colonial period. Talavera pottery began in the city of Puebla when the Spaniards brought over from Europe the techniques of making maiolica pottery, itself brought from China via the Arabs. The techniques and designs were based on the pottery made in Talavera, Spain. The high-quality clay and the formation of guilds to ensure quality soon made pottery made in Puebla a near-luxury item. The craft waned after Independence, but made a comeback in the latter 20th century. Today certified Talavera pottery in made only in a handful of workshops in the capital and other nearby communities. To be certified as genuine the same methods as used in the 16th century must be applied. True Talavera pottery is expensive and considered to be collector's items.

Other types of pottery in the state exist. One is the black clay figures made in Acatlán de Osorio. Most of these figures are animals and are almost always painted with white designs. Black clay is also used to make cups, plates and other utilitarian items in other communities. Another important clay craft are the Trees of Life, mostly made in the community of Izúcar de Matamoros and Acatlán de Osorio. Traditionally, these are sculptures depicting Adam and Eve in the Garden of Eden, but the craft has evolved to include other themes as well.

The making of textiles and embroidery dates back to pre-Hispanic times. Traditional clothing such as rebozos, sarapes, shirts and pants are still made in various parts of the state and reflect the different indigenous communities which are found here. Hueyapan is one of the better known artisanal textile producers, with clothing items and others richly and colorfully embroidered. Both the thread used to weave the cloth and embroider it are dyed with natural dyes such as those obtained from the cochineal insect. Another area known for its textiles is Zacapoaxtla in the north of the state.

The town of Amozoc is known for its silverwork. This tradition began when a number of metalworkers of various types settled here after the Conquest in the 16th century. These smiths made a variety of objects from the everyday such as knives, swords, stirrups and more, eventually branching into finer metals such as silver and gold, mother-of-pearl, ivory and more. However, it is silver smithing which has best survived to the present day.

There are two widely practice paper crafts in Puebla. The making of bark paper or amate was known in pre-Hispanic times when such was reserved for special ceremonies and the recording of important information. It had an almost magical quality to it and was used for spells, clothing of idols and other ceremonial purposes. Today, the paper is still made as an art form and often painted with elaborate designs. In Puebla, the paper is still made by hand and often it is hand-painted with pre-Hispanic designs. One area noted for this craft is San Salvador Huixcolotla. Another is San Pablito Pahuatlán in the Sierra Norte. One notable amate paper artist is curandero Alfonso García Téllez, who narrates stories and ceremonies in his works. Another paper craft is papel picado, or "chopped paper." This craft began with the introduction of crepe paper from Asia. This paper is elaborately cut to form figures and scenes which are then hung for decorative purposes for holidays such as Day of the Dead. This most traditional of these are laborious cut by hand, but most are done today by machine. Those native to Puebla feature a large figure with a detailed background and are considered to be part of the state's cultural heritage (Patrimonio Cultural del Estado de Puebla).

A relatively recent craft is the making of blown glass Christmas ornaments in Chignahuapan. This municipality has about 200 workshops which employ about 1,500 workers, which makes the spherical ornaments individually and many are shipped internationally to the United States and Latin America. This craft is still growing and represents one of the more stable small scale manufacturing endeavors in Puebla.

For many rural communities, the making of handcrafted furniture, both fine and rustic, is an important economic activity. One such community is Ciudad Serdán, which makes wooden utensils, decorative figures and banister work in addition to furniture. It has a strong reputation along with Chignahuapan. Areas outside of Ciudad Serdán are known for specializing in reproductions of Louis XV and Louis XVI furniture. The community of Trinidad Alonso Báez is known as the only place in Latin American where pianos are made purely by hand. They are also known for the repairing of musical instrument with many of the state's antique church organs fixed by craftsmen from here.

Onyx is a plentiful stone in the state and it is worked into figures and other items in various parts of the state. The most important deposit of the stone is in Tecali and many workshops fill the streets of this town. Most of the pieces made are decorative in nature but small utilitarian items such as plates and ashtrays are also made.

Amozoc has been known for silver smithing since colonial times, when European techniques were brought over by the Spanish. As back then, they still make items such as jewelry, silverware, and items for church rituals. These smiths' work is considered to be quality, with the finest pieces encrusted with precious and semi-precious gems, gold, and ivory.

The first glass workshop in New Spain was established in Puebla by Spaniard Rodrigo Espinoza in 1542. It remained the only one in Spain's colonies for decades, exporting glass items to places such as Peru and Guatemala. In the 18th century, Pedro Antonio revitalized the craft with a new factory. This factory was the main producer until the establishment of the Compañia Empresarial para la Fabricacion del Vidrio Plano y Cristal in 1838. This company introduced French designs and techniques to Mexico. The next major glassmaker was Victor Martinez Filoteo, who established the Fabrica La Luz in 1935. This company is still the major producer of glass items in the state. Small workshops are prevalent in Huaquechula, where they specialize items made with black and smoke-colored glass.

=== Commerce and transportation ===
Thirty five percent are employed in commerce, tourism and transportation. The state has 8,995 km (5,589 mi) of highways and 1,024 km (636 mi) of rail line, as well as twenty three major malls. Outlet Puebla was opened in 2001 on the highway between Mexico City and the city of Puebla where it intersects with the Periferico Ecologico. It contains more than 80 outlet stores with major national and international brands such as Reebok, Guess and Pepe Jeans, located on a site of over 30,000m2. The enterprise is run by Asesores en Exposiciones y Calpro, S. A. de C. V. The mall targets traveling customers from the states of Puebla, Veracruz, Oaxaca and Tlaxcala as well as Mexico City.

The international airport in Huejotzingo is linked to the Mexico City airport by land transport. Efforts have been made to expand the airport in Huejotzingo to be an auxiliary to the overcrowded Mexico City airport. The airport has been chosen due to its relatively quiet airspace and proximity to the nation's capital. As of 2010, the airport handles sixty operations per day, 40 of which are commercial flights serving 2.5 million passengers per year.

=== Tourism ===
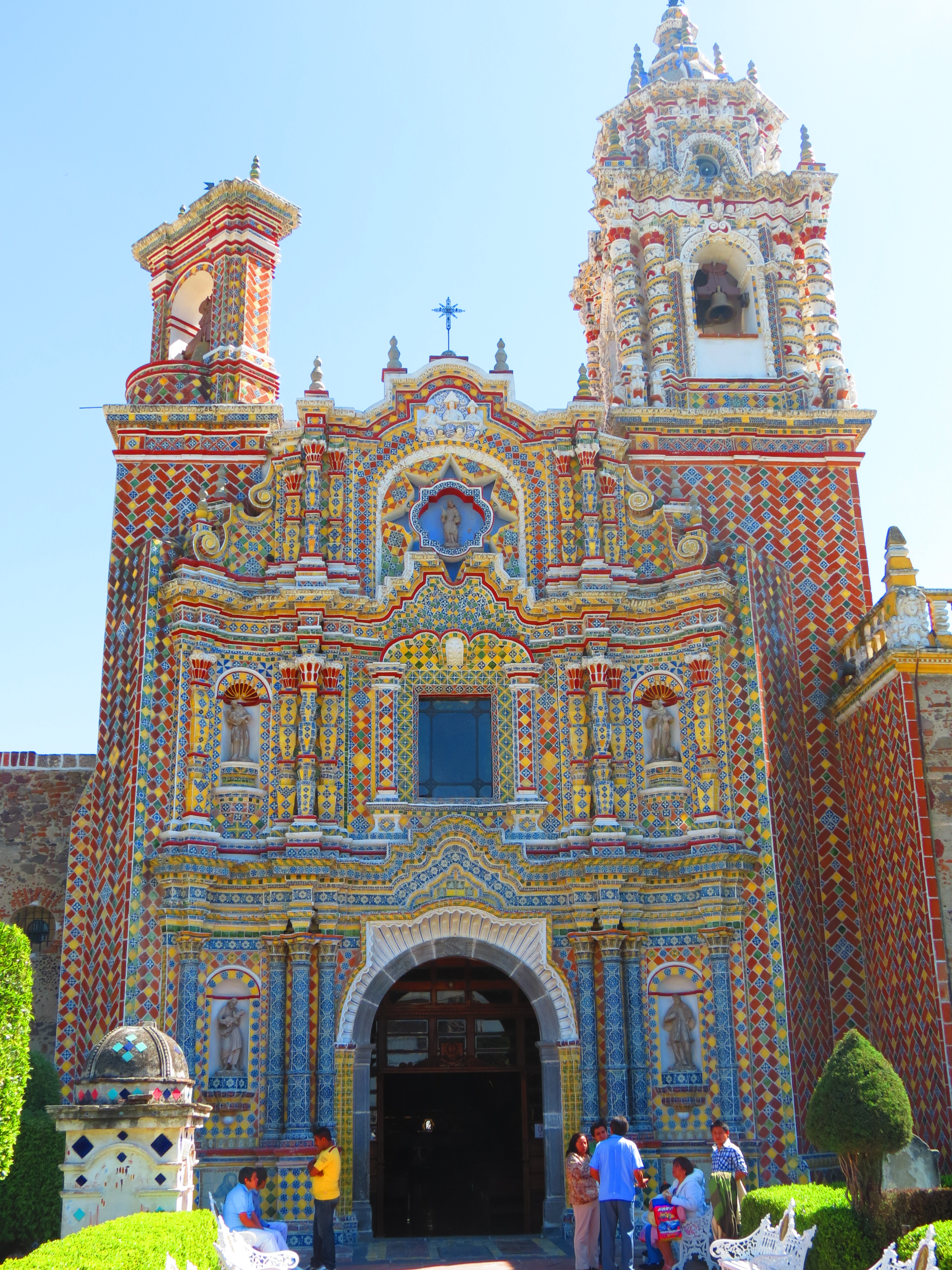
Church of San Francisco Acatepec

The state has 2,600 historic buildings, antiques, bars and pottery workshops. The downtown of the capital is filled with churches, government buildings and large homes, built by indigenous hands for their Spanish overlords. This downtown was declared a World Heritage Site in 1987.

The state promotes twelve tourist routes, seven in the city of Puebla and five in the rest of the state. These routes cover the most representative buildings of the history of the state up to modern attractions such as the Africam Safari zoo. The first tourist route in the city of Puebla passes by the Cathedral, the Palafoxiana Library, the Capilla del Rosario, Calle de Santa Clara, Palacio Municipal, Casa de los Muñecos and the Museo Amparo. The second route passes by the Casa del Alfeñique, the Mercado de Artesanias, the Barrio del Artista, the Teatro Principal and the San Francisco Church. The third route contains the Railroad Museum, the Museo y Pinacoteca Ex-Convento de Santa Monica, the Ex-Convento de Santa Rosa, the Museo de la No-Intervencion Fuerte de Guadalupe and the Mercado de Antiguedades. The fourth route contains the San Francisco Acatepec Church, the Santa Maria Tonatzintla Church, the Capilla Real, the Cholula archeological site, the Los Remedios Church and Huejotzingo. The fifth route includes Cuauhtinchan, Tecali and the Africam Safari Zoo.

Outside of the Puebla metropolitan area, the state promotes natural attractions such as the cacti of Zapotitlán, the 100-million-year-old fossils of Cantera Tlayùa in Tepexi de Rodríguez and smaller ones such as waterfalls, churches, caverns, archeological zones, former monasteries, traditional markets, fresh water springs, lakes and more. The tourist routes outside of the Puebla metro area are divided into the Sierra Mixteca area in the south and the Sierra Norte in the north. The Sierra Mixteca area includes the Ruta de Aguacate (Avocado Route), the Ruta del Ónix (Onyx Route), the Ruta del Maiz (Corn Route) and the Ruta Paleontológica (Palaeontology Route). The Avocado Route includes the municipalities of Atlixco, Tianguismanalco, Tochimilco, Huaquechula, Tlapanalá, Izúcar de Matamoros, San Juan Epatlán, Chietla, Chiautla de Tapia and Acatlán de Osorio. The Onyx Route includes the Africam Safari Zoo, Cuauhtinchan, San Salvador Huixcolotla, Tecali de Herrera, Tecamachalco and Tepeaca. The Corn Route includes Tehuacán, Santa María del Monte and Zapotitlán Salinas. The Paleontology Route includes Atoyatempan, Santa Clara Huitziltepec, Molcaxac, Huatlatlauca, Chigmecatitlán, Tepexi de Rodríguez and San Juan Ixcaquixtla.

The Sierra Norte contains a number of pre-Hispanic archeological sites and colonial architecture. Crafts to be found here include wool clothing, amate paper, clay figures, wood carvings, and embroidered blouses. This area of the state contains the Ruta de la Flor (Flower Route), Ruta Interserrana (Inter-Mountain Route), Ruta del Huipil y Café (Huipil and Coffee Route) and the Ruta Perla Norte (North Pearl Route). The Flower Route includes the municipalities of Chignahuapan, Zacatlán, Huauchinango, Juan Galindo, Pahuatlán, Tenango, Tetela de Ocampo and Xicotepec. The Inter-Mountain Route includes Ahuacatlán, Zapotitlán, Xochitlán, Tepango and Nauzontla. The Huipil and Coffee Route include Tenextatiloyan, Acajete, Cuetzalan, Jonotla, Libres, Nopalucan, Oriental, San José Chiapa, Tepeyahualco and Zacapoaxtla. The North Pearl Route includes Atempa, Chignautla, Hueyapan, San Juan Xiultetelco, Teziutlán, Tlatlauquitepec and Yaonahuac.

There are a number of former haciendas in the state, many of which have been converted into hotels, spas and other kinds of attractions. Some have also been used as movie and television sets for projects such as Alondra, Amor es Querer, Man on Fire, Vantage Point and Frida. These include the Chautla Hacienda in San Salvador el Verde, Las Calandrias in Atlixco, Micuautla in Puebla, Netxalpa in Atlixco, San Pedro de Ovando in Acatzingo, Ozumba in San José Chiapa, Rancho Jesús in Cuautinchan, San Agustín in Atlixco, San Mateo in Amalucan, San Roque in Atlixco, Santiago Texmelucan in Tepeyahualco de Hidalgo and Oriental Tenextepec in Atlixco.

Natural attractions in the state include Amacas in Cuetzalan, Bosque Chignahuapan Forest, the Quetzalapa Chignahuapan Waterfall, Zacatlán Waterfall, La Gloria Cuetzalán Waterfall, Las Brisas Cuetzalan Waterfall, Las Golondrinas Cuetzalan Waterfall, Nexcapa Hauachinango, Ocpaco Zacatlán Waterfall, the arid landscapes of Zapotitlan de Salinas, the Iztalcihual and Popocatepetl volcanos, the basalt columns of Huauchinango, the Valle de Piedras Encimadas in Zacatlán and the Nexcaxa Dam in Huauchinango, el Aguacate Waterfall in Huehuetlán el Grande, and los Ahuehuetes in Atlixco.(scenarios)

Puebla is working with neighboring Veracruz to promote the area's tourist attractions and develop them in an ecologically sustainable way. Both state governments are working with organizations of tour operators, hotels and restaurants to pool a fund for activities such as advertising campaigns, especially to Mexico City and the State of Mexico, which account for 80% of all the state's visitors. Another is the reimbursement of tolls for those who travel to certain attractions such as the Africam Safari park and two-for-one specials. Efforts have succeeded in raising hotel occupancy rates from 40% to 56% in a number of areas.

== Archeological sites ==
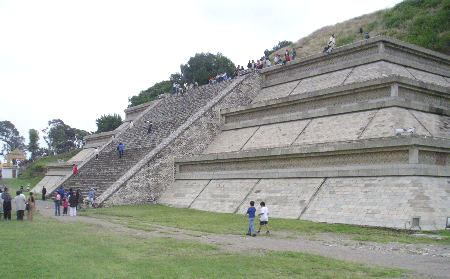
Great Pyramid of Cholula

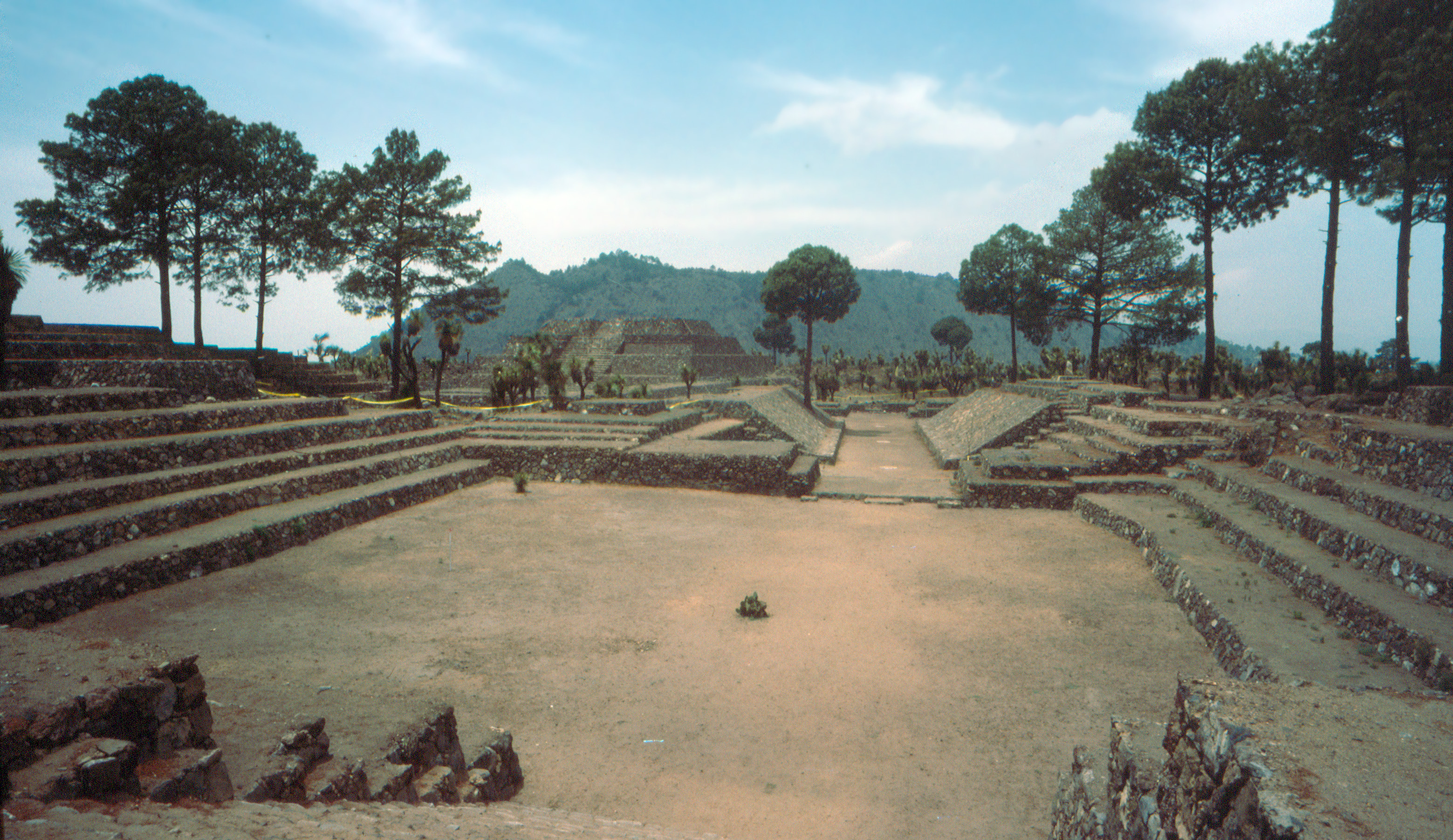
Cantona

Cantona is a 12 square kilometres (5 sq mi) archeological site, located in the north of the state between the municipalities of Tepehualco and Coyoaco. It is divided into three units, with work only done on the south unit, which is the best preserved. Here is found the "Acropolis," an area with temples, palaces and other seats of authority. The site was occupied between the 7th and 11th centuries CE and reached its height at the time many other Classic era urban centers were falling. It is thought that this city interrupted the flow of goods from the coast of Veracruz to Teotihuacan, one of the many causes of that city's downfall. The site is filled with a large number of patios which measure 50 x 40 meters or larger. Total number of patios found is 620, and 997 mounds have been found as well. In some areas, remains of obsidian and sandstone workshops have been found.

Cholula was once a major Mesoamerican city with a multicultural population that was bound by a common religion based on the worship of Quetzalcoatl. The city was a pilgrimage site for the worship of this deity. Its architecture was complex and shows various foreign influences. Its height was reached during the Classic period between 100 and 900 CE along with Tula and Teotihuacan. It was regionally influential for much of the Mesoamerican period, and its polychromic pottery has been found in a large number of sites, indicating trade. By the time the Spanish arrived, it was still a very large city, second only to Tenochtitlan, to which it was subject. Today, the site is known for its Great Pyramid.

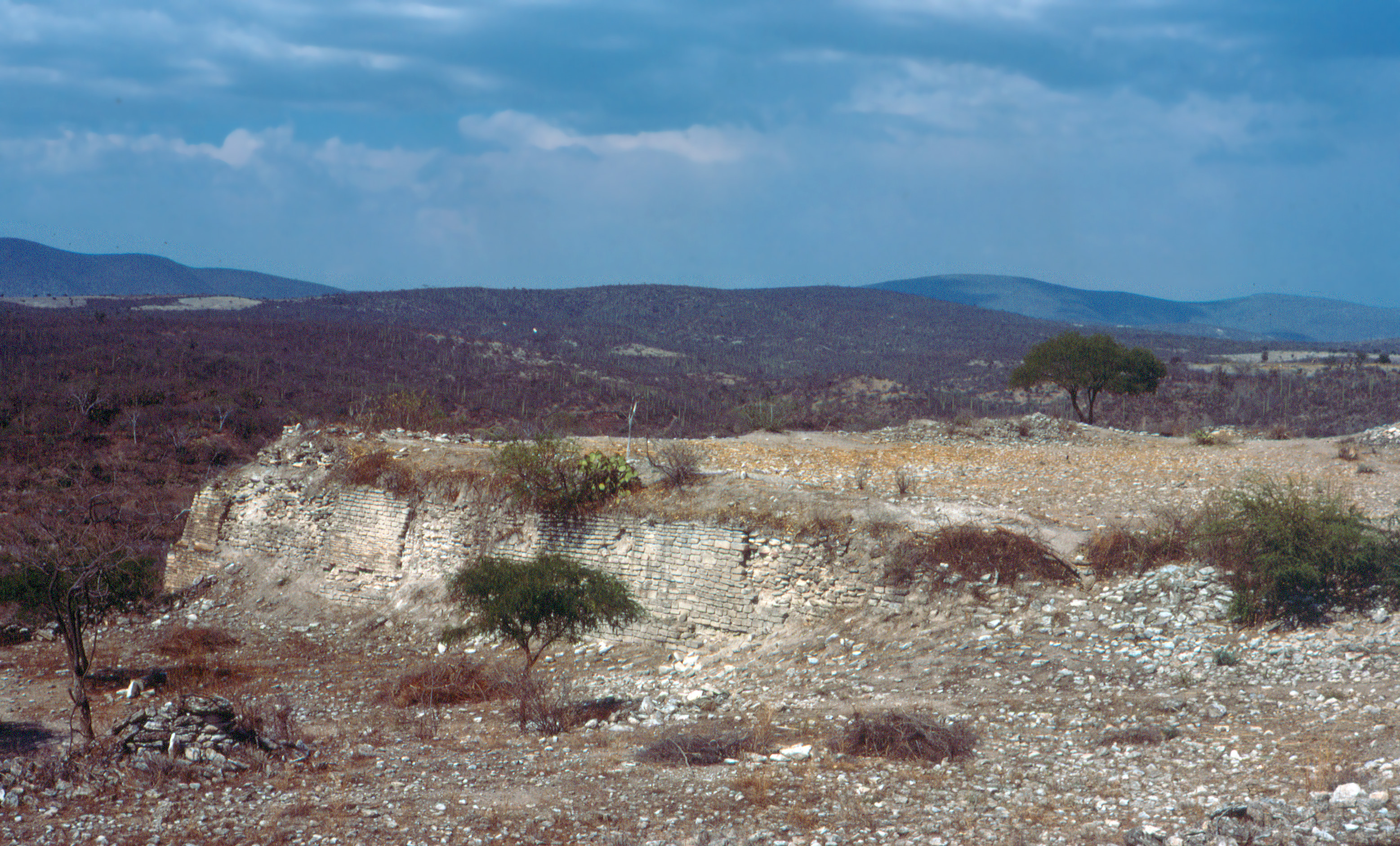
Tepexi el Viejo

Tepexi el Viejo is located southeast of the city of Puebla. It was founded as the seat of one of the most important Popoloca dominions and control much of what is now the south of the state from 1200 to 1500 CE. This area's light orange colored pottery has been found as far away as Teotihuacan. The site is naturally protected by mountains and canyons and is divided into five areas. Each has platforms, pyramidal mounds, residential areas and tombs. The most important pyramidal mound is located in the center of the site and other, smaller one is located to the extreme west. Residences are located in the northwest, many of which are L-shaped. There is only one natural opening to the area, which is in the south about 6 km (4 mi) outside the city's walls.

Unlike other sites in the state, Yohualichan was dominated by coastal groups, which eventually abandoned it in the face of incursions from peoples from the central highlands. The site was a ceremonial center which was probably dominant over other similar sites. Containing niched pyramids as well, it is related to the El Tajín site in Veracruz. There is also a residential area, but it has not been studied.

Tepatlaxco is located on the south side of the Totlqueme mountain. It is centered on a ceremonial center which has more than eight structures, surrounded by numerous smaller mounds. Much of the site was constructed into the mountain itself, causing it to blend in. In addition to the mountain, there are two large ravines to give the site added protection. The most important structure is named Mound A, which also shows the longest occupation. It measures nine meters high and 36 meters at its base.

== Food ==
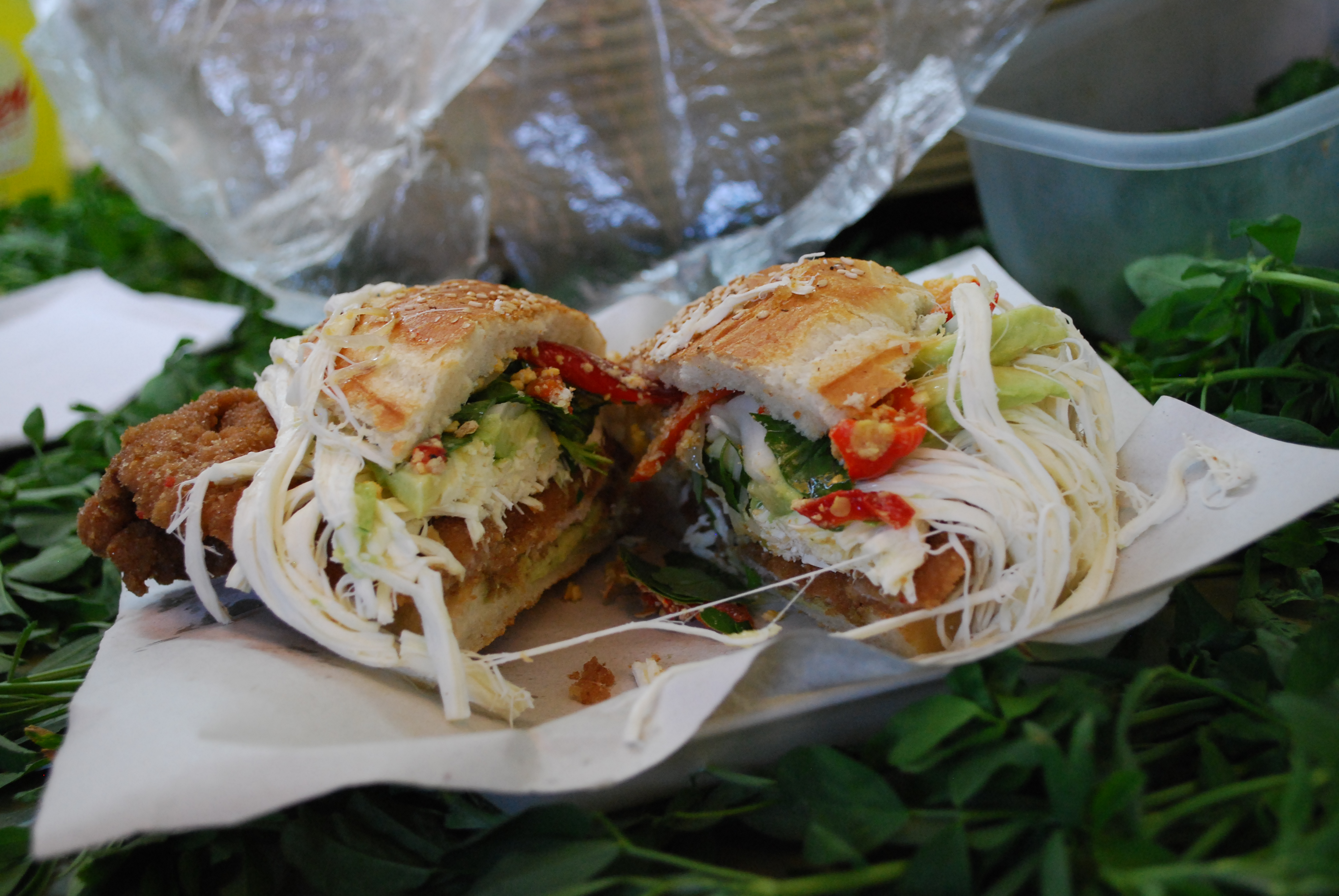
Cemita sandwich

Other foods common to the state include atole with chili pepper (chileatole), spicy mole verde, barbacoa, chilate with chopped onion, cemitas, cecina, guacamole with lime, and mole de caderas or mole espinazo. Many of these are found in the Sierra Mixteca region. However, the state is best known for cemitas, mole poblano, chiles en nogada and chalupas.

The cemita is a kind of sandwich on a roll, related to the torta, particularly popular in Mexico City and the pambazo, which is of French origin and common in several areas in central Mexico. The sandwich has its origin with two kinds of bread which were brought over from Spain during the colonial period: one called "bizcocho de sal", which was long and hard and a kind of hollow cracker. Both breads were developed for long storage and eventually were made in Puebla with grain from the Atlixco area. These two breads eventually fused into a unique type that became softer by the mid-19th century. The name is derived from a Jewish unleavened bread called "semita", which was brought over by Sephardi Jews to New Spain. These were also produced in Puebla state. The cemitas were prepared at home and filled with potatoes, beans and nopal cactus and eaten by the lower classes. Later, an establishment in the Mercado Victoria market began to sell them to the public filled with meat from bull's feet with a vinaigrette, herbs, onions and chili peppers. This new filling was a hit and eventually this and other variations became a staple in many markets and popular eateries. Today, many varieties exist but all are prepared using the same type of bread.

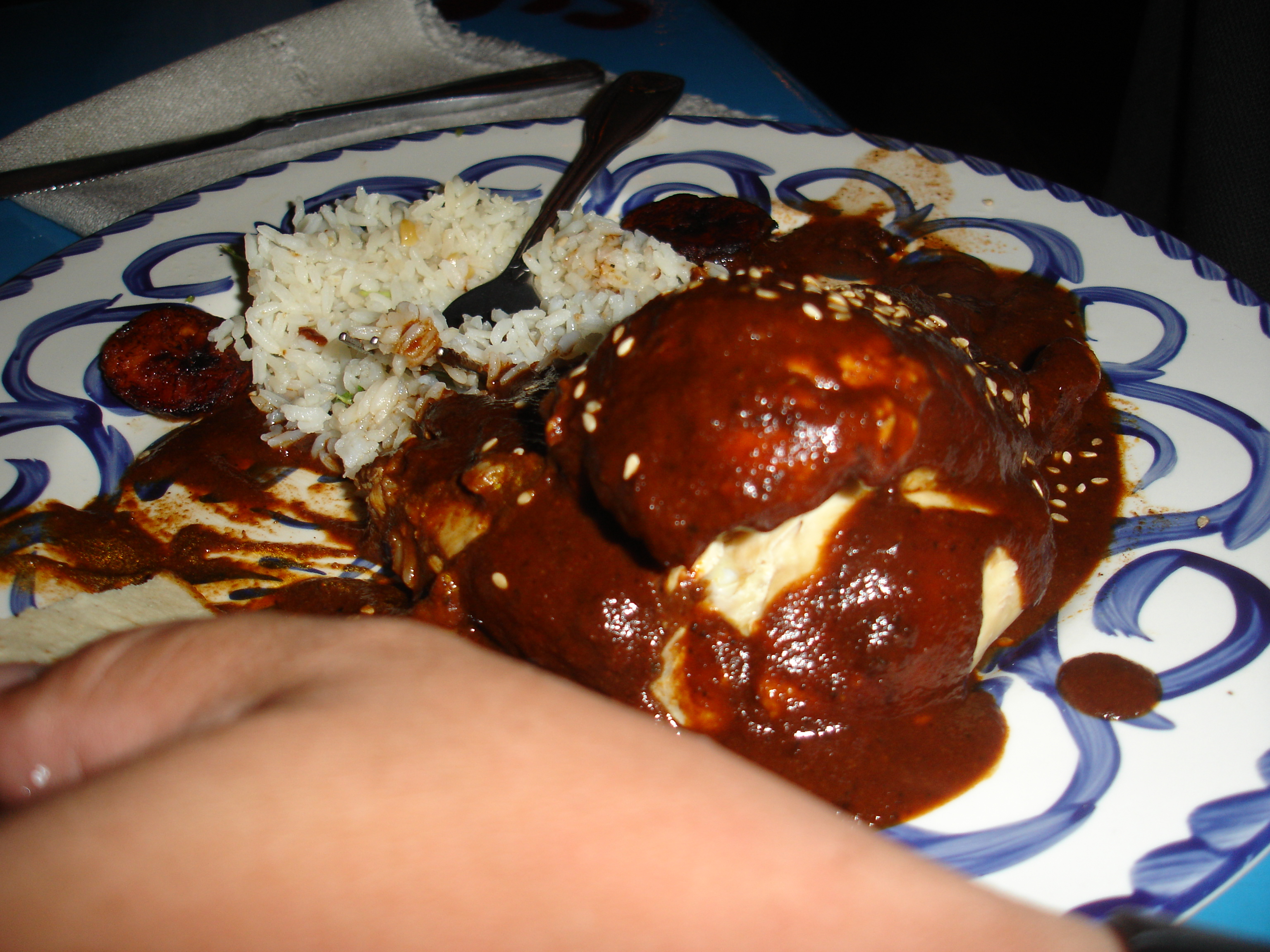
Mole poblano

The best-known mole is named after the city of Puebla, mole poblano. The origin of this sauce is disputed and there are two versions of the legend that are most often cited. The first states that 16th-century nuns from the Convent of Santa Rosa were worried because they had just found out that the archbishop was going to visit them and they had nothing to cook for him except an old turkey in the yard. Supposedly due to divine inspiration, they began to mix together many of the spices and flavorings they had on hand in the kitchen, including different types of chili peppers, other spices, day-old bread, chocolate and approximately twenty other ingredients. They let the sauce simmer for hours and poured it over the turkey meat. Fortunately, the archbishop was very pleased with the meal and the nuns were able to save face.

The other story states that the sauce is of pre-Hispanic times and this was served to Hernán Cortés and the other conquistadors by Moctezuma II. The Aztecs did have a preparation called chilmulli, which in Nahuatl means 'chili pepper sauce'. However, there is no evidence that chocolate was ever used to flavor prepared foods or used in chilmulli. The sauce instead gained ingredients as it was reinterpreted over the colonial period.

Many food writers and gourmets nowadays consider one dish, the legendary turkey in mole poblano, which contains chocolate, to represent the pinnacle of the Mexican cooking tradition.

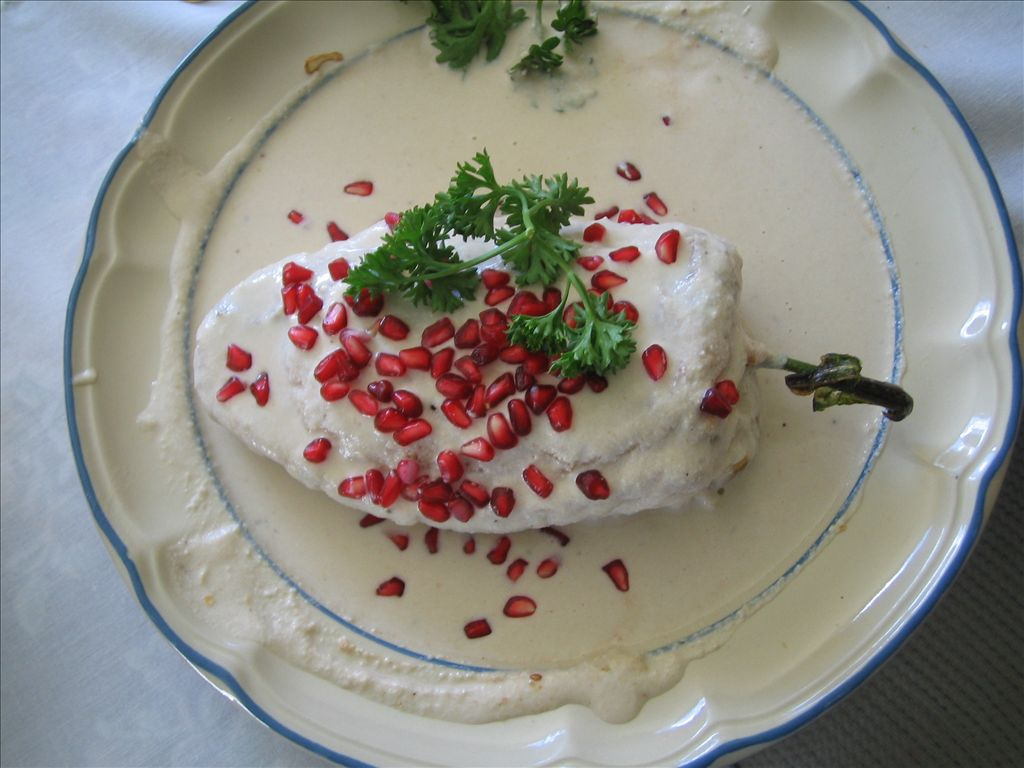
Chile en nogada

According to the legend of chiles en nogada, there were three sisters from the city of Puebla who were in Mexico City. When the Army of the Three Guarantees entered the capital at the end of the Mexican War of Independence, they were feted by many. At one of these parties, the three sisters fell in love with three of the army's officers. Soon after, Agustín de Iturbide himself was set to visit the city of Puebla. Remembering the sisters, the soon-to-be emperor wanted to visit them. Wanting to impress Iturbide but not knowing how to cook, the sisters turned to the nuns of the Santa Monica convent who were famous for their food. The nuns decided to invent a dish for the sisters, which would represent the three colors of the new Mexican flag. On the appointed day, the banquet was prepared with the dish now called chiles en nogada, which pleased Iturbide. The dish contains poblano chile, walnuts, cream and pomegranate seeds, and is offered seasonally (August–September) in local restaurants.

Chalupas are thick corn tortillas fried in lard, then covered in red or green chili pepper sauce, followed by shredded meat and other toppings. According to legend, they were named after the barges that the Aztecs used to travel in areas such as Tenochtitlan (today Mexico City). Chalupas are common in other areas of central Mexico but are considered a specialty of Puebla, where they are served in venues from humble street carts to upscale restaurants.

== Myths and legends ==
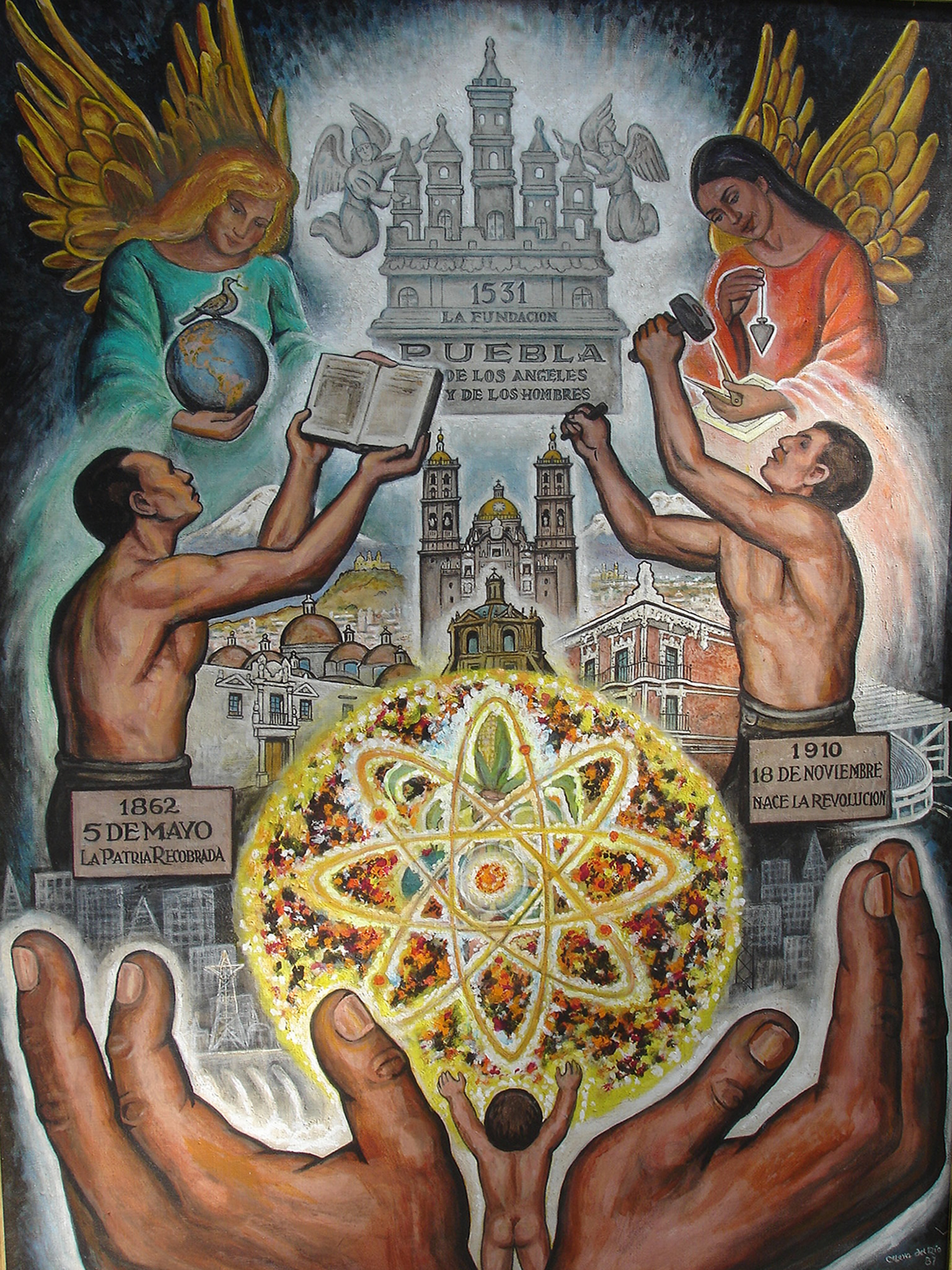
Mural of the founding of Puebla by Roberto Cueva Del Río

The legend of the founding of the city of Puebla attributes to the act of the vision of a friar Julián Garcés, who became the first bishop of Puebla. The legend states that while praying, the friar fell asleep, when he dreamed of a festival in honor the Archangel Michael happening in a place with leafy trees and a crystal clear river, flowing from springs. As they contemplated the scenery, angels descended from heaven and traced the outlines of the city to be built. When he awoke, he drew what he had seen, deciding he had had a divine vision. He communicated the dream to other Franciscans and found the place he saw five days later.

The story of the China Poblana is one of the most popular in the state. The girl was taken on the Manila Galleon, but she was sold to Puebla resident Miguel de Sosa for a price ten times what the viceroy offered. She was taken to the city and baptized with the name of Catarina de San Juan in 1620. She maintained her oriental dress which made her conspicuous and it became a fad to imitate some aspects of this dress.

When de Sosa and his wife died, Catherine entered a convent and began to see visions of the Virgin Mary and the Child Jesus. Some say that a number of miracles occurred while Catherine lived at the convent and this provoked a kind of veneration of her. When the China Poblana died in 1882, veneration of her as a saint began in earnest, but the practice was put to an end by the Mexican Inquisition. Today her remains are in a crypt in the Temple de La Compañia in the city of Puebla.

The Aztec myth of Popocatépetl and Iztaccíhuatl, a Romeo and Juliet type story, has equal significance in this state as it does in the Valley of Mexico as the two are equally visible from the city of Puebla, but only in reverse (with Popocatépetl on the left).

There is a popular saying "todo terminó como el Rosario de Amozoc, a golpes y farolazos" (it all ended like the Amozoc Rosary, with blows and drinks). The saying is derived from a legend from the community of Amozoc de Mota in the state. A silversmith apprentice by the name of Alberto was in love with a beautiful girl named Catalina, nicknamed La Culata. However, another apprentice from another shop named Enrique, was also in love with her. Alberto was accepted by la Culata and this made Enrique jealous. Festivities for the beginning of the year were supposed to be organized by the different silver workshops together but the rivalry caused a split in which ecclesiastical authorities needed to intervene. On the first day of the event, at Mass, Enrique saw Alberto and Catherine kiss briefly, which enraged him. During the rosary, while the choir sang "Mater Inmaculata," Enrique heard "mata a la Culata" (kill La Culata), took a knife from his clothing and attacked the couple, killing Catarina. Alberto took a machete from his belt and killed Enrique. A fight ensued which left many dead and wounded. It is said that one can still hear the cries of Catalina as she died.

The house at Avenida 3 Ote 201 in the city of Puebla belonged to Pedro de Carvajal, who was a wealthy and respected man. However, he lost his young wife as she gave birth to their second child, a boy. When his daughter turned 15, there were many interested suitors but she was not interested in them. One day a monster appeared at a party in the city provoking terror. The monster went to the Carvajal house and ate the younger son, who was playing out front of the house. Pedro offered a large reward for the capture of the beast. One young man, who wanted the hand of Pedro's daughter, appeared at another festival, bearing the head of the beast. It is said that this young man gained noble title and the hand of the daughter as a reward.

== Culture ==
=== The two volcanos ===
The state of Puebla is located on the east side of the volcanoes of Popocatepetl and Iztaccihuatl, opposite of the Valley of Mexico and Mexico City. The two volcanoes have as much significance here as they do on the west side, with many communities nearby maintaining ritual specific to honoring the two. These arose as fertility rituals but today are called "birthdays" with 12 March reserved for Popocatepetl and 30 August for Iztaccíhuatl. On these events, special foods and gifts are prepared as offerings and left in certain places. These traditions have survived despite the evangelization efforts of the colonial period.

=== Festivals and holiday ===
The state is home to a number of festivals and traditions, from those with a purely pre-Hispanic background, to the far more numerous saints' days to modern fairs located to regional economies. The largest important events include the Day of the Dead in Huaquechula, the Carnival of Huijotzingo, Spring Equinox in Cantona, Fiesta de Santo Entierro y Feria de las Flores, the Fería del Café y el Huipil, the Huey Atlixcáyotl Festival, the Quetzalcoatl Ritual and Cinco de Mayo, celebrated in the entire state.

Cinco de Mayo—or the fifth of May—is a holiday that celebrates the date of the Mexican army's 1862 victory over France at the Battle of Puebla during the Franco-Mexican War (1861-1867). A relatively minor holiday in Mexico, in the United States Cinco de Mayo has evolved into a commemoration of Mexican culture and heritage, particularly in areas with large Mexican-American populations. Many Americans mistakenly believe that Cinco de Mayo ("May 5th") is the Mexican equivalent of the United States' Fourth of July holiday — a date marking the official casting off of colonial rule via the announcement of a new independent country. However, the Mexican version of Independence Day is celebrated on September 16, for it was on that date in 1810 that the commencement of the war for Mexican independence from Spanish rule was pronounced in the small town of Dolores by Miguel Hidalgo y Costilla (an event now referred to as the "Grito de Dolores" — "Cry of Dolores" — or "El Grito de la Independencia").

Cinco de Mayo is an important celebration in a number of places the United States, but it is a minor holiday or even unknown in much of Mexico proper. The only place where the holiday, which commemorates the Battle of Puebla during the French Intervention in Mexico, is important is in the state of Puebla. The French army invaded the country in 1862 and marched from Veracruz towards the city of Puebla. Just outside the city, inexperienced Mexican troops attacked the French who were camped. This resulted in victory, but the French were ultimately able to move on and take Mexico City, dominating the country until 1867. The annual celebration of the battle began in the state in areas of the country not occupied by the French as a symbol of Mexican pride. Today it is the most important state political commemoration. The most important observances take place at the Loreto and Guadalupe forts in the city of Puebla, where the battle occurred in 1862. The highlight is a reenactment of the event at the site.

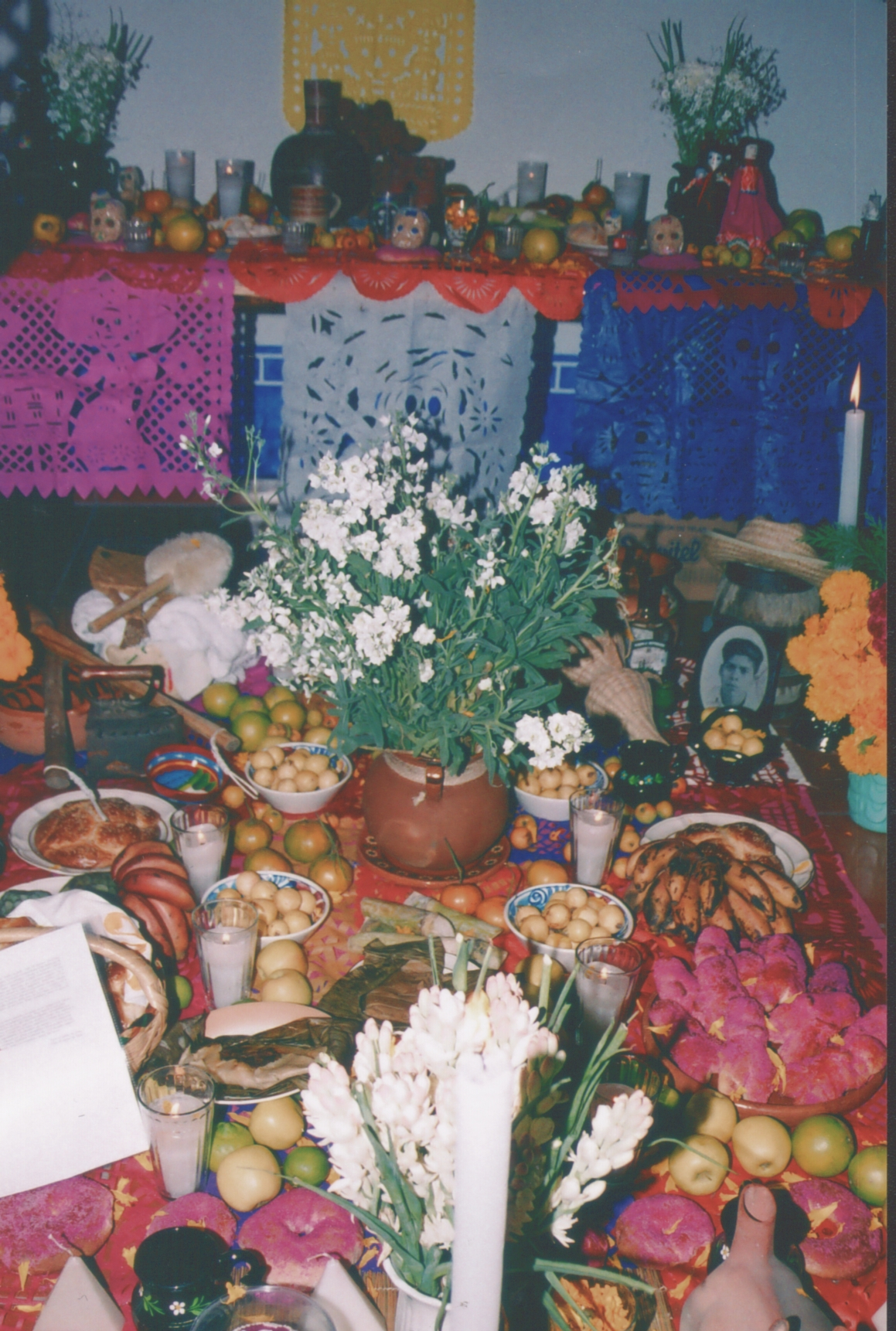
Day of the Dead altar in the Sierra Mixteca

Like the rest of Mexico, Day of the Dead is celebrated in the state. Two aspects which feature prominently on altars in this state are mole with turkey and large wax candles. Other items can include black candelabras, incense burners, candy skulls, decorative paper cutouts, oranges and other fruits in season. Leading to these altars often are a line of small candles to guide the returning spirits. One municipality which is particularly known for its events is Huaquechula. Here, altars constructed in homes can be of multiple levels and are usually covered in white paper. On the first level, food and drink are usually placed, with religious objects and objects related to the deceased on the second level.

In a number of communities in the state, Carnival is celebrated. The best known of these carnivals takes place in Huejotzingo, as it began as a synthesis of a celebration honoring Tlaloc and the Catholic tradition related to the days before Ash Wednesday. Today, this carnival includes many traditional activities such as music, masks and parades, but this one also includes a reenactment of the Battle of Puebla and local legends such as the kidnapping of a governor's daughter and the legend of Agustìn Lorenzo (called the Robin Hood of the 18th century). Locals attend in colorful costumes and masks representing the Conquistadors, demons or animals, adorned with palm fronds or feathers. The capital of Puebla also celebrates Carnival with its signature tradition of the Las Marias, where men disguise themselves as women and mischievous devils.

Another major time for religious observance is Holy Week or Semana Santa. In Puebla, there is the Procession del Silencio or Procession of Silence which occurs on Maundy Thursday, when the city observes a period of silence to mark the death of Jesus.

The spring equinox is the setting for rituals at some of Puebla's archeological sites such as Cantona and Cholula. Cantona is an archeological site located near the city of Puebla and was one of the largest cities in early Mesoamerica. Today, the site is popular gathering place on the spring equinox (much like Teotihuacan), where people sing, dance and greet the sunrise on this date. Another site where similar observances are held is the Great Pyramid of Cholula. Here indigenous dances and rituals are performed. The event culminates with the Ritual of Quetzalcoatl, which was an important part of the ancient Cholula culture. This event draws attendees from various parts of Mexico.

The Huey Atlixcáyotl Festival is celebrated in the town of Atlixco to celebrate the area's local culture and identity. The name means "Atlixco tradition" in Nahuatl and is centered on the San Miguel Hill (called Popocatica in ancient times) located in the center of the town. It was locally sacred in the pre-Hispanic era, and in colonial times, a hermitage was built there. The event was named a Cultural Heritage of the State of Puebla in 1996. The purpose of the event is to celebrate the survival of indigenous culture after the Conquest.

In July, the Pueblo Mágico of Cuetzalan has the cultural festival of Festival Tradicional, which features traditional dancers who come from various parts of the state. Tetela de Ocampo celebrates its Peach Festival in August. On the last day of August, the Procession de los Faroles (Procession of the Lanterns) takes place in Cholula.

Puebla has a number of annual fairs meant to highlights the various regions' products. In Huauchinango, an economic fair and a religious observance are conducted at the same time. The Feria de las Flores (Flower Festival) and the Santo Entierro (Holy Burial) occur in the second half of March. It consists of religious events such as processions and masses. Many cut flower and ornamental plant growers come to display their products and there is the coronation of the Queen of Flowers. Other events include agricultural displays, parades with floats, dances, crafts, cockfights, sporting events and more.

The Feria del Café y el Huipil (Coffee and Huipil Festival) takes place in Cuetzalan. The event promotes the area's locally grown coffee as well as traditionally made huipil dresses. There are also displays of pre-Hispanic dance, popular music, fireworks and more. The event began in 1949 as the National Festival of Coffee, which is economically important here. The event centered on the choosing of a Coffee Queen, much like other similar kinds of festivals. In 1962, the National Festival of the Huipil was established. Eventually, the two merged to the current event.

Other events to promote Puebla's products include the Feria de Café in Xicotpec in March and the Feria Nacional de Puebla. The latter is held in the state capital and brings together many of the state's agricultural, livestock, craft and industrial producers in an event very analogous to a state fair. The regional fair called the Piloto de Cholula occurs in September.

=== China Poblana ===
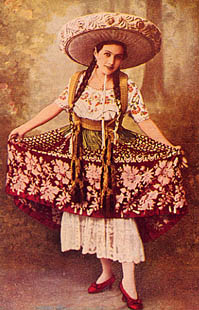
Woman in china poblana dress

The China Poblana was a real person who lived during the colonial period. Her real name was Mirra. She was an Indian who was brought over from Manila in the 1620s on the Manila Galleon as a child to work as a slave for the viceroy Marques de Gélves. She was soon sold to ship captain Miguel de Sosa who lived in Puebla. According to legend, Mirra was originally a princess in her home country but her family was displaced by the Portuguese and she was kidnapped by pirates who sold her. Mirra was considered to be beautiful and exotic. She had been converted to the Catholic faith. Later in her life, she began to have visions of the child Jesus and angels. Her fame grew and she was eventually considered to be something of a prophet. When she died in 1688, people began to venerate her as a saint and many women copied her Asian/Mexican inspired dress.

This fashion led to the now-traditional china poblana dress. It consists of a red skirt heavily decorated with colored sequins that in one part form the image of the eagle found on the Mexican flag and a blouse embroidered with colored thread and beads around the bust area. It is often worn with a charro-type hat. The outfit is the amalgam of several cultures such as Spanish, especially in the skirt; Chinese, with its use of sequins and beads; and indigenous, with colorful embroidery.

=== Dance ===
Folk dance of both indigenous and mixed European and indigenous origin are most often seen at religious and cultural events in many parts of the state. Some of the most popular dances include "Moors and Christians," Dance of the Santiagos" and "Danza de los Arcos." The last is usually performed only by men who dress in white and with a scarf-like garment across the chest, dance in pairs which carry large arch portals covered in flowers and paper decorations. The dance has a number of variations which can include leaps into the air and complicated twirls.

The Dances of the Quetzales is most popular in the Sierra Norte, especially in Cuetzalan. It is a highly symbolic dance and usually performed in conjunction with rituals that relate to good harvests. The dancers form crosses, which signify the four cardinal directions and move in circles, which symbolize the rotation of time. The dancers wear large circular headdresses of quetzal feathers, which give the dance its name, and red suits. The Dance of the Voladores, which more common in Papantla, Veracruz, is also performed in a number of communities in the north of Puebla. This consists of five men who climb a tall pole and then four fall and spin from the pole while attached by ropes. The fifth dancer stays on top and plays music and dances as the other men fall. Another important dance in Puebla is the Doce pares de Francia, which recalls the events of the Battle of Puebla.

=== Architecture ===
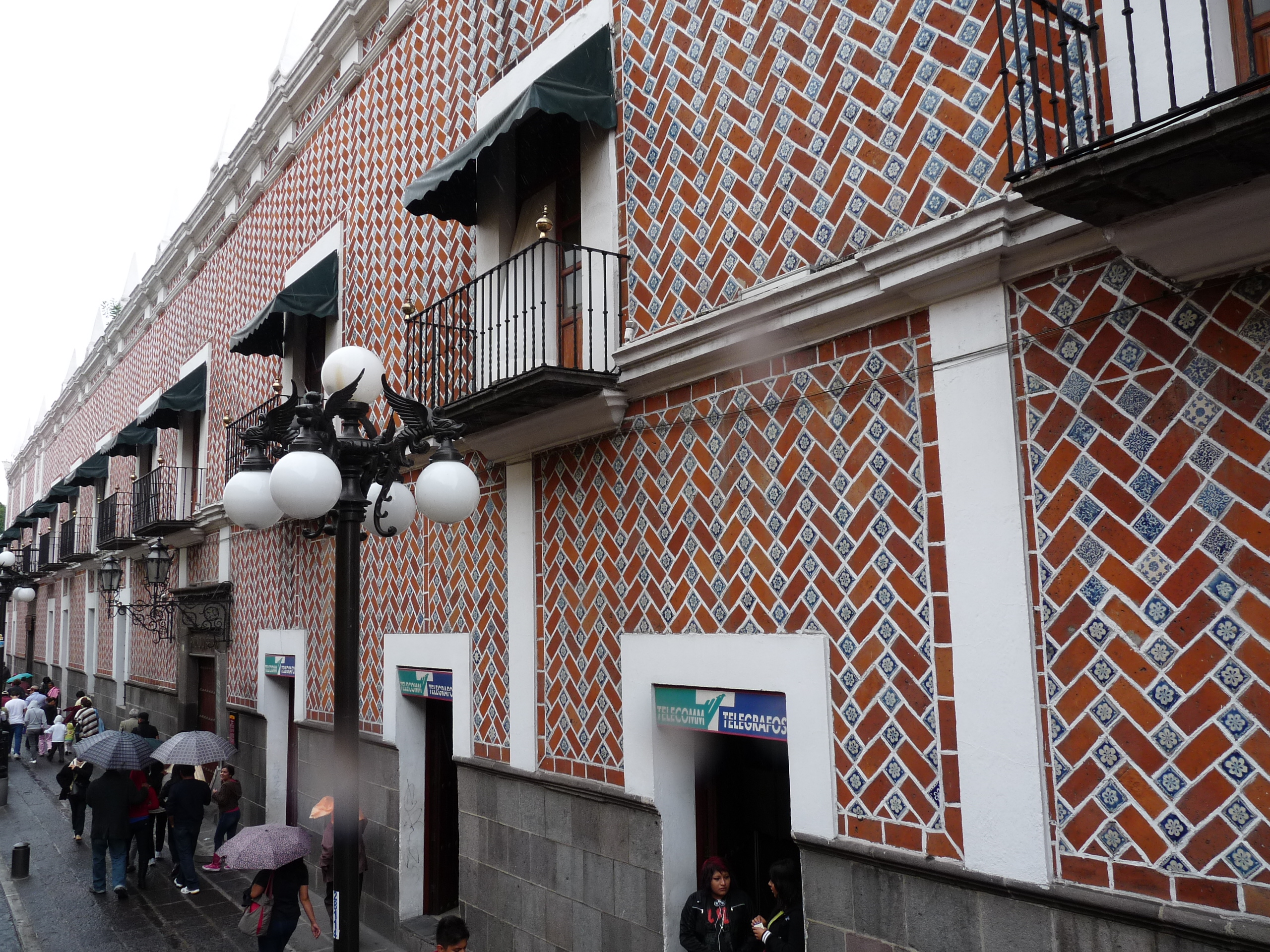
The exterior of the Biblioteca Palafoxiana in Puebla City, Mexico, is recognized by the UNESCO for being the first public library in the Americas. Founded in 1646 by Juan de Palafox y Mendoza.

The colonial architecture of the state is defined by its heavy use of ornamental tiles called Talavera. This is particularly true in the capital. This makes these buildings more colorful than most of their contemporaries in other parts of Mexico and was one of the reasons that the historic center of the capital was selected as a World Heritage Site.

A number of churches and other buildings in rural parts of the state are noted for their "folk baroque" architecture and decoration, especially in Atlixco and the southwest. Folk baroque consists of the use of tile and painted raised stucco based on more traditional Baroque designs, which was most popular in the 18th century. One well known church of this type is the church of Jolapan, which is modeled after the Tepalcingo Sanctuary in neighboring Morelos. The church of Jolalpan contains richly decorated pilasters, Solomonic columns and other elements in a design very similar to that of Tepalcingo. Between these there are a number of small churches which also show folk baroque influence such as those in Tlancualpican and Tzicatlán. The church in Tlancualpican is painted in bright blues, greens and red, with an ornate façade with sculpted leaves, tendrils and niches divided by spiral half-columns all done in stucco. Even more ornate is the church in Tzicatlán, which is a small rural farming village, with the entire surface of the main façade decorated with brightly colored images and sculptures.

In the modern era, architectural styles have evolved into new and sometimes eclectic forms. Skyscrapers, almost all of which are in the city of Puebla, include Edificio Vacas at 42 meters high, Torre Géminis at 50 meters high, Torre Nora at 69 meters high to the tallest, Torre Ejecutiva JVI and Torre Ejecutiva JVI at 100 meters high each. These last two have a triangular shape and are covered in blue tinged glass.

=== Literature ===
Literature is one of the better-developed arts in the state and includes works such as novels, essays, poetry and theatrical plays. One prominent name from the colonial period is that of José Mariano Beristáin de Souza who was a priest and writers in the 18th century. He is also known for amassing a large library of writings in Spanish over twenty years of his life, which resulted in the Biblioteca Hispanoamericana Septentrional. However, literature would not be a major cultural force in the state until the 20th century. One early prominent writer was poet Gregorio de Gante. In his early career, he was a professor but after the Mexican Revolution broke out the joined revolutionary forces under Antonio Medina. After the war, he began his career as a poet, eventually writing regularly for a newspaper called "El Nacional" and become one of Mexico's most popular writers by the 1930s.

Many modern works with themes of social injustice and sometimes about the culture and scenery of the state itself. Modern Puebla literature can be traced back to the work of poet Arturo Trejo, one of the "Generacion de los 50" or Generation of the 1950s.

Elena Garro was active during the mid and latter 20th century, whose writings were said to "grab" the reader. Most of her work was autobiographical in one sense or another. She was married to another Mexican writer Octavio Paz, from whom she divorced in 1959.

Born in Atlixco in 1930, Hector Azar is one of Mexico's most noted playwrights in the 20th century. Some of his works include Revista de Revistas, Revista de la Universidad and Jueves de Excelsior. He has also directed and produced plays in Mexico and Europe.

Sergio Pitol Demeneghi is a writer, translator and diplomat who was born in the city of Puebla in 1933. Most of his works relate to the theme of human rights. Much of his writing and translating work relates to his diplomatic functions. His best known works include No hay tal lugar, Infierno de todos and Los climas. Born in Puebla in 1949, Ángeles Mastretta's writings are known for their female characters which are prominent. She has found most of her popularity in Spain and Mexico publishing stories in magazines such as Ovaciones and La Jornada. Her books include El Mundo Ilumninado, Arrancame la vida and Mujeres de ojos grandes. José Francisco Conde Ortega, also known simply as Paco Conde, was born in Atlixco in 1951. His writings include chronicles, essays and poetry. His works mostly reflect on everyday urban life with book titles such as Estudios para un cuerpo, Los lobos viven del viento and Práctica de lobo.

José Luis Zárate was born in Puebla in 1966. He is best known for novels such as Xanto: Novelucha libre, La ruta del hielo y la sal and Del cielo oscuro y del abismo, but he has published numerous short stories, essays and poems. He is known in the fantasy genre and has established organizations dedicated to this such as the Asociacion Mexicana de Cienca Ficcion y Fantasia and Circulo Puebla de Ciencia Ficcion y Divulgacion.

Other notable writers from the state include, Fritz Glockner, Pedro Ángel Palou Garcia, Miguel Maldonado, Eduardo Montagner Anguiano, Gabriel Wolfson Reyes, Jaime Mesa and Gabriela Puente.

=== Painting ===
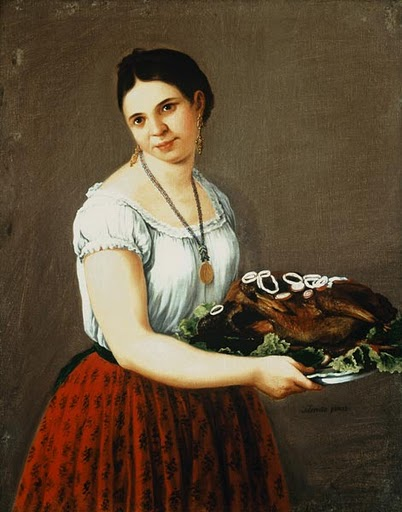
Muchacha de Pueblo by José Agustín Arrieta (es)

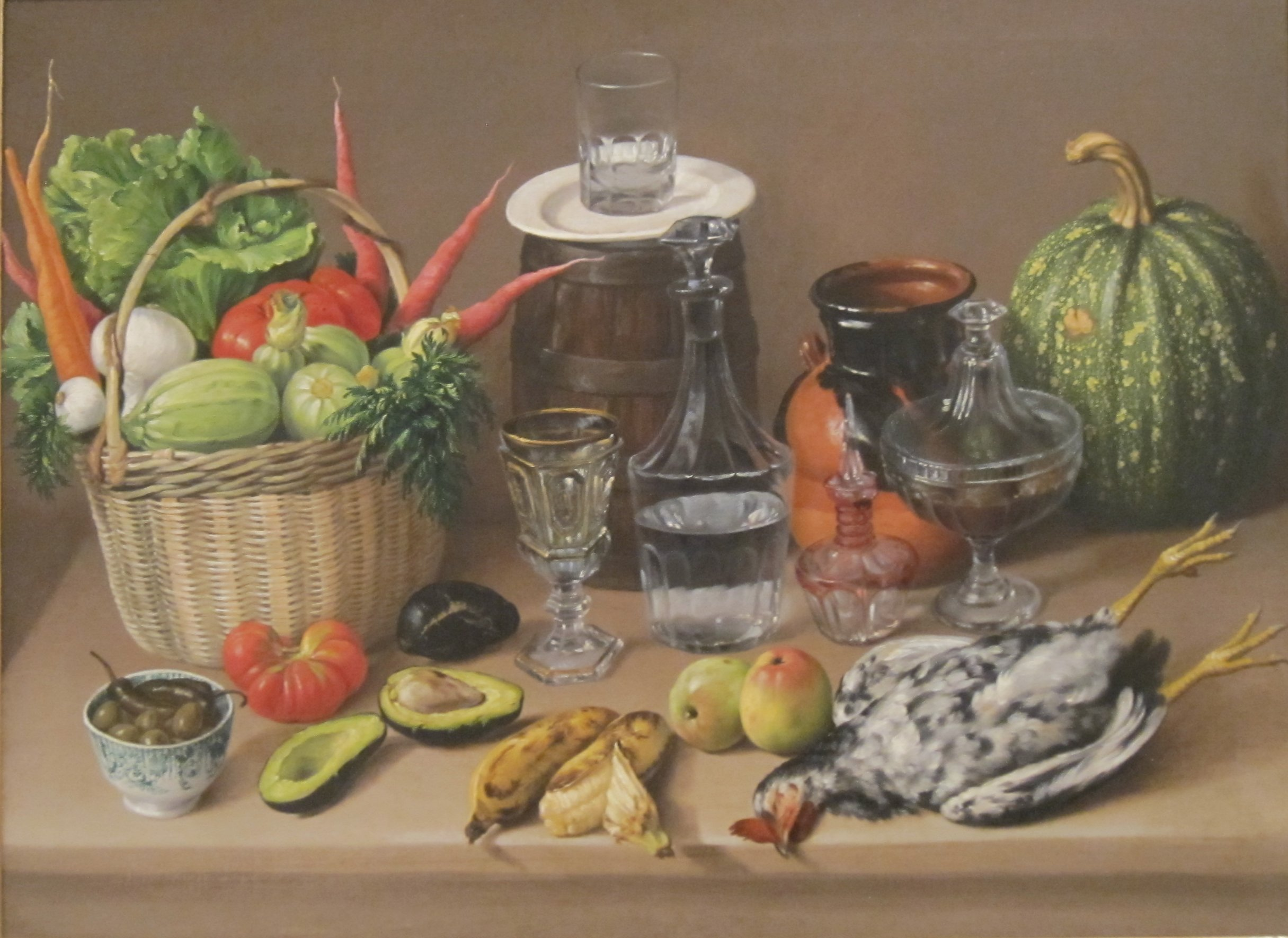
Still-life, José Agustín Arrieta, c. 1870

Much of the historical painting in the state is found in its colonial churches and reflect the artistic styles of the 16 to 19th centuries. These consist of murals, portraits and biblical scenes done on canvas, wood and other mediums. José Joaquín Magón was born in Puebla in the 18th century is known for his portrait paintings but his other works have mostly religious and mythological themes. He also did a number of works related to New Spain's caste system. Luis Berrueco is one of the major Pueblan painters from the 18th century. He was also prolific, painting images of religious martyrs and saints which can still be found today in many churches in the state. His style is considered to be unique, marked by delicate faces and profuse ornamentation. Some of his best work can be found at the Santa Clara Church in Atlixco. Gonzalo Carrasco was born in Otumba, Puebla in 1859. He was both and artist and a Jesuit who produced over 500 religious paintings that can be found all over Mexico and some murals including those in the Basilica de Guadalupe in Puebla and Fordham University in the U.S.

Much of Puebla's art scene had disappeared before the 20th century but in the 1920s, a group of young artists from the Escuela de Bellas Artes de Puebla (School of Fine Arts of Puebla) began to band together for mutual support. These artists eventually caught the attention and patronage of artists such as Diego Rivera and Dr. Atl and received visitors such as David Alfaro Siquieros, Frida Kahlo, Francisco Cornejo and Alfredo Guati Rojo. This effort would become the Barrio del Artista.

The Barrio del Artista is a neighborhood in the city of Puebla which is home to artists from a number of disciplines. It contains 46 small workshops which permit visitors to observe the work and even chat with the artists. These workshops mostly surround a large plaza with a fountain near a building known as the Café del Artista, managed the Union de Artes Plasticas, A.C. "Barrio del Artista," which was founded in 1941.

Ignacio Dávila Tagle was born in the city of Puebla in 1898 into an artistic family, learning to paint from his father, Daniel Dávila Domínguez. One of his best-known works is his dreamlike mural called "El sueno de fray Julián Garcés" which depicts the legendary founding of the city.

Faustino Salazar Garcia was born in Puebla in 1912. He turned to painting as a child after he lost his mother. His works are known for their emotional qualityAs an established painter, he was one of the founding members of the Unión de Artes Plásticas.

Alejandro Honda was born in San Martin Texmelucan in 1952. This painter's works show his fascination for Mesoamerica, which began when he was young. They can also have a sensual edge to them, even his religious paintings such as the María de Magdalena.

Gustavo Cadena was born in Puebla in 1974 has been a noticed painter since he was a young child. Many of his works reflect daily life, customs and traditions of the state. Some of his better known works include Niño indígena mexicano, Catedral de Puebla, and Pensando en Puebla.

=== Music ===
Traditional music in Puebla has been influenced by the waltz, zarzuela and the Mexican version of trova. Although it waned in the 20th century, it has since experienced a revival.

Pelagio C. Manjarrez (1886–1952) was from Tochimilco. He is not only known for his musical ability but also as a fighter in the Mexican Revolution, professor, journalist and poet. Most of his musical composition relate to dance such as waltzes, marches, foxtrots and tangos. Best known titles include "Porque me has besado tu," "La mañana está de fiesta" and "Alma herida."

Vicente T. Mendoza (1894–1964) was from Cholula who dedicated himself to researching the folk music of the area, especially those traditions that told the history of many of the state's communities. He founded the Folclorología Musical Mexicana. He also composed a number of pieces including the polka "La hora del crepúsculo," the waltz "La molinera," and religious pieces such as "Villancicos alegres para la Navidad" and "Cánticos para Navidad."

Gerardo Pablo is one of the main Pueblan composers of modern trova Mexicana who was born in Puebla in 1977. Many of his lyrics deal with social problems in Mexico and his work has been compared to that of Guty Càrdenas. Some of his best known works include "Tres noches por semana," "Càntaro", "Reflejos acústicos", "Trago de Ron", "Delirio", "Los Numerosos Nadies" which is based on the work of Uruguayan writer Eduardo Galeano,"Escucha a Gerardo Pablo" and "Quesoy" his most recent work with a Jazz Trio. Other notable musicians include Carlos Espinosa de los Monteros (waltz composer), pianist Celia Valderrábano Andrew who has also composed waltzes. Zarzuela composers include Félix Maria Alcerreca who is a lawyer by profession and Ignacio León who is a priest.

Rockercoatl, a contemporary musical group based in Puebla, gained notice for performing exclusively in Nahuatl.

== Media ==
Newspapers of Puebla include: El Heraldo de Puebla, El Mundo de Tehuacán, El Sol de Puebla, Esto de Puebla, La Jornada de Oriente, La Opinión Universitaria, La Opinión, Diario de la Mañana, Metro de Puebla, Momento Diario, Puebla sin Fronteras, Síntesis de Bolsillo Puebla, and Síntesis, El Periódico de Puebla.

== Education ==
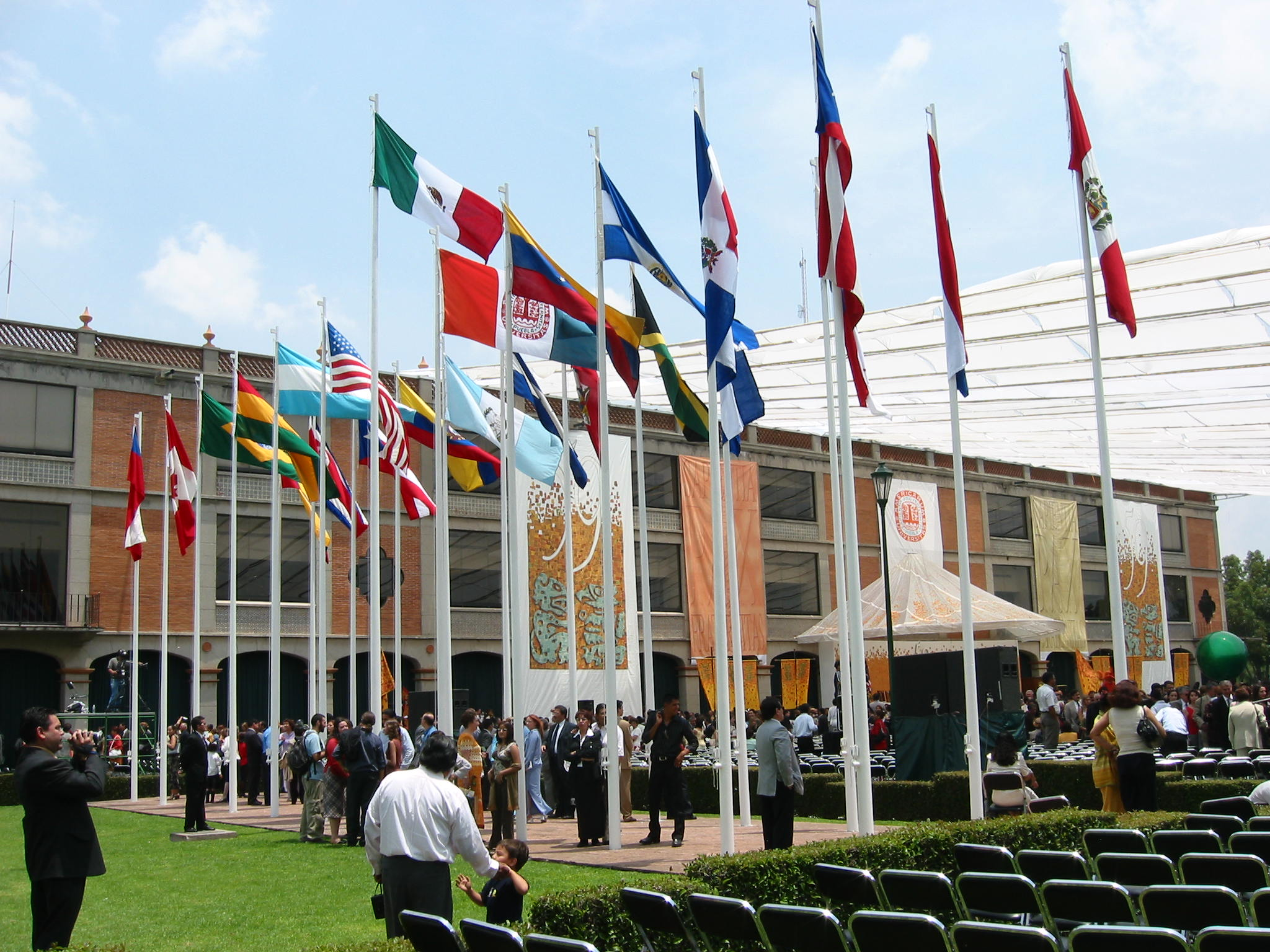
UDLAP library

Puebla is ranked second in higher education in Mexico with 57 technological colleges and 110 research centers. It ranks fourth in the number of universities and colleges in the nation. It is home to very prestigious institutions such as Benemérita Universidad Autónoma de Puebla (BUAP) is the oldest and largest university in Puebla founded on 15 April 1587, Tecnológico de Monterrey, Campus Puebla, and Universidad de las Americas-Puebla, which has substantial ties to the United States, such as being accredited by the Southern Association of Colleges and Schools and numerous student exchange programs. It has also received substantial economic assistance from the U.S. Agency for International Development. Much of the school's setup mimics that of U.S. universities, including student dormitories.

Instituto Tecnológico de Puebla was founded in 1972, Universidad Popular Autónoma del Estado de Puebla (UPAEP) was founded in 1973, and Universidad Iberoamericana Puebla founded in 1983. They were also created to fill a need for higher education of a growing local economy.

Puebla City has the highest education in the State, but the average of the rest of the population of the state over the age of 15 has finished the first year of middle school with an average number of years in school at 7.4. This is under the national average of 8.1. Of every 100 over age 15, 12 have not gone to school at all, 17 have left school before the end of primary, 21 finish primary, 3 start, but do not finish middle school, 19 finish middle school, 5 begin but do not finish high school, 8 obtain a bachelor's degree and 1 has an advanced degree. There are 441, 699 illiterate people, or 13%, according to INEGI, above the national average of eight percent.

== Government ==
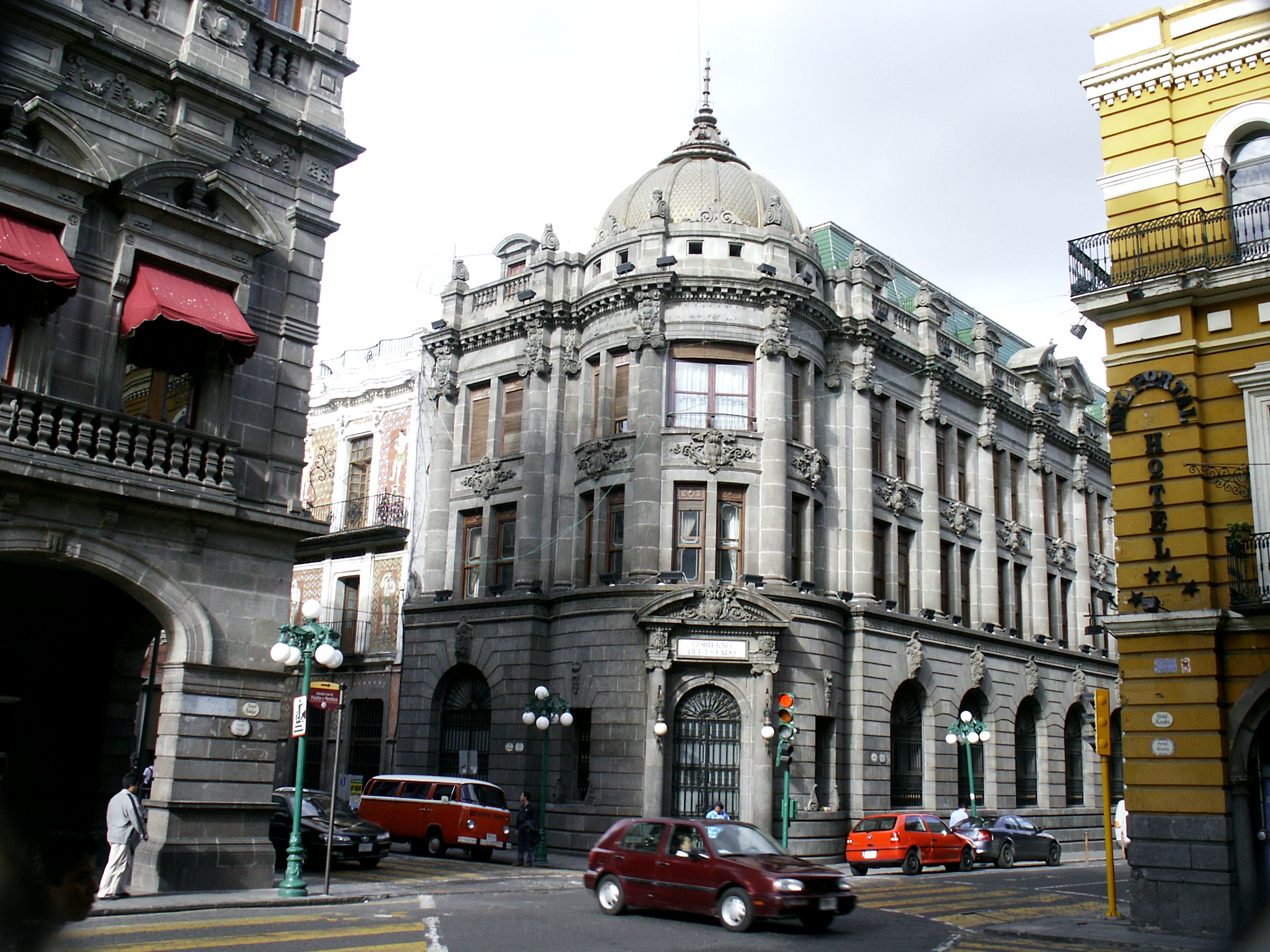
Hall of protocols of the State Government of Puebla City.

The current division of the territory was created in 1895, which is a system of 21 districts and 217 municipalities. This is down from a high of 222 because the municipalities of San Jerónimo Caleras, San Felipe Hueyotlipan, San Miguel Canoa, La Resurrección, and Totimehuacan were incorporated into the city of Puebla in 1962.

The state is headed by a governor who is directly elected. The executive branch of the government contains the following departments: Governing (Gobernación), Finance, Development, Evaluation and Control of the Public Administration, Economic Development, Tourism, Rural Development, Urban and Ecological Development, Communications and Transportation, Health, Public Education, Culture and Public Defender (Procuraduia General de Justicia). The legislative branch is unicameral with deputies or representatives elected from the various districts of the state. It also consists of a number of commissions dedicated to issues such as state heritage sites, education, agriculture and more. The judicial branch is headed by the Tribunal Superior de Justicia.

== Major communities ==
- Acatlán de Osorio
- Amozoc de Mota
- Atlixco
- Cholula (Cholula de Rivadabia)
- Cuetzalán
- Huauchinango
- Izúcar de Matamoros
- Puebla City
- San Martín Texmelucan de Labastida
- Tehuacán
- Teziutlán
- Zacatlan

== Notable natives and residents ==
- Ignacio Comonfort – President of Mexico 1855–1858
- Juan N. Méndez – President of Mexico 1876–1877
- Manuel Ávila Camacho – President of Mexico 1940–1946
- Bernardo López de Mendizábal – governor of New Mexico between 1659–1660
- Gustavo Díaz Ordaz – President of Mexico 1964–1970
- Vicente Suárez – one of the Niños Héroes of the Battle of Chapultepec
- Arturo Guzmán Decena – founder of Los Zetas drug cartel
- Sofía Lama Stamatiades – television actress
- Hugo Laborice - painter

== See also ==
- Discalced Carmelite Convent of San José and Santa Teresa (Puebla)
- Mendicant monasteries in Mexico
- Earliest 16th-century monasteries on the slopes of Popocatépetl

== Bibliography ==
- Ramos, Frances L. Identity, Ritual, and Power in Colonial Puebla (University of Arizona Press; 2012) 288 pages; on the politics of public ceremony in the 18th-century city
- Jimenez Gonzalez, Victor Manuel, ed. (2010). Puebla:Guía para descubrir los encantos del estado [Puebla: Guide to discover the charms of the state] (in Spanish). Barcelona: Editorial Oceano, S. L. ISBN 978-607-400-234-8.
