= Municipalities of Puebla =

List of municipalities of Mexican state

Map of Mexico with Puebla highlighted

Puebla is a state in central Mexico that is divided into 217 municipalities. According to the 2020 census, it is the fifth most populated state with 6,583,278 inhabitants and the 21st largest by land area spanning 34,309.6 square kilometres (13,247.0 sq mi).

Municipalities in Puebla are administratively autonomous of the state according to the 115th article of the 1917 Constitution of Mexico. Every three years, citizens elect a municipal president (Spanish: presidente municipal), by a plurality voting system, who heads a concurrently elected municipal council (ayuntamiento) which is responsible for providing all the public services for their constituents. The municipal council consists of a variable number of trustees and councillors (regidores y síndicos). Municipalities are responsible for public services (such as water and sewerage), street lighting, public safety, traffic, and the maintenance of public parks, gardens and cemeteries. They may also assist the state and federal governments in education, emergency fire and medical services, environmental protection and maintenance of monuments and historical landmarks. Since 1984, they have had the power to collect property taxes and user fees, although more funds are obtained from the state and federal governments than from their own income.

The largest municipality by population is Puebla, with 1,692,181 residents (25.70% of the state's total), while the smallest is San Miguel Ixitlán with 526 residents. The largest municipality by land area is Chiautla which spans 804.20 km^{2} (310.50 sq mi), and the smallest is Rafael Lara Grajales with 4.10 km^{2} (1.58 sq mi). The newest municipality is Ahuehuetitla, established in 1963.

== Municipalities ==
Largest municipalities in Puebla by population

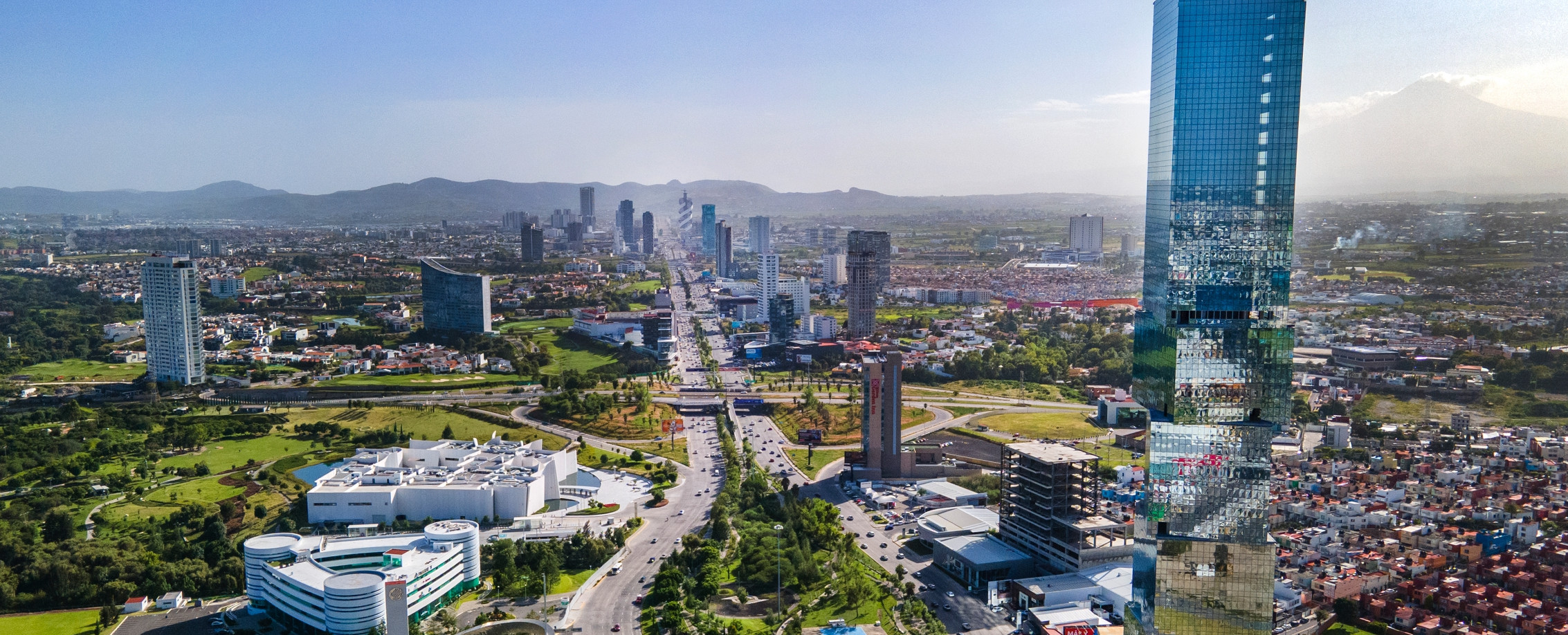
Puebla, capital and largest municipality by population in Puebla

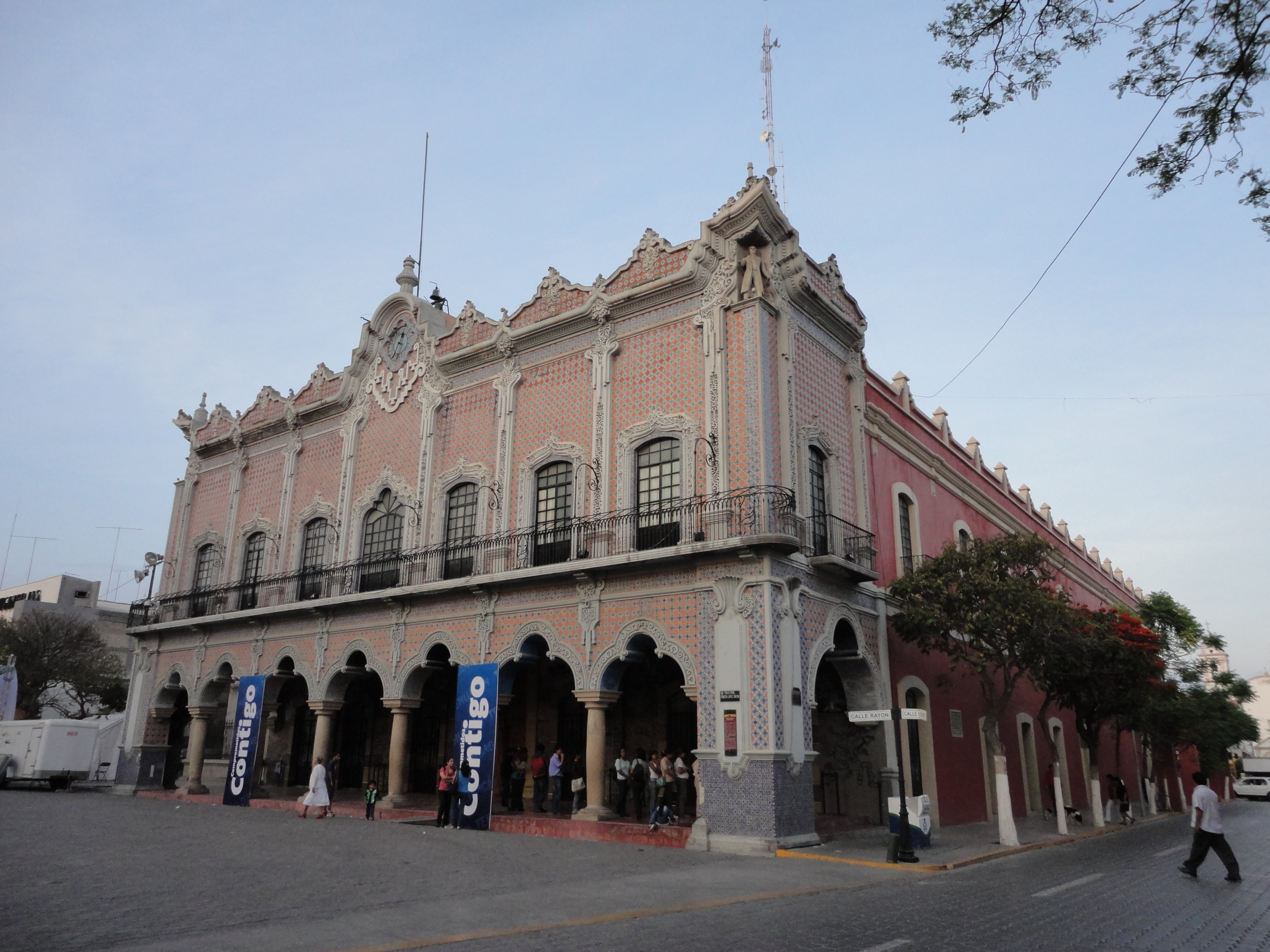
Tehuacán, second largest municipality by population

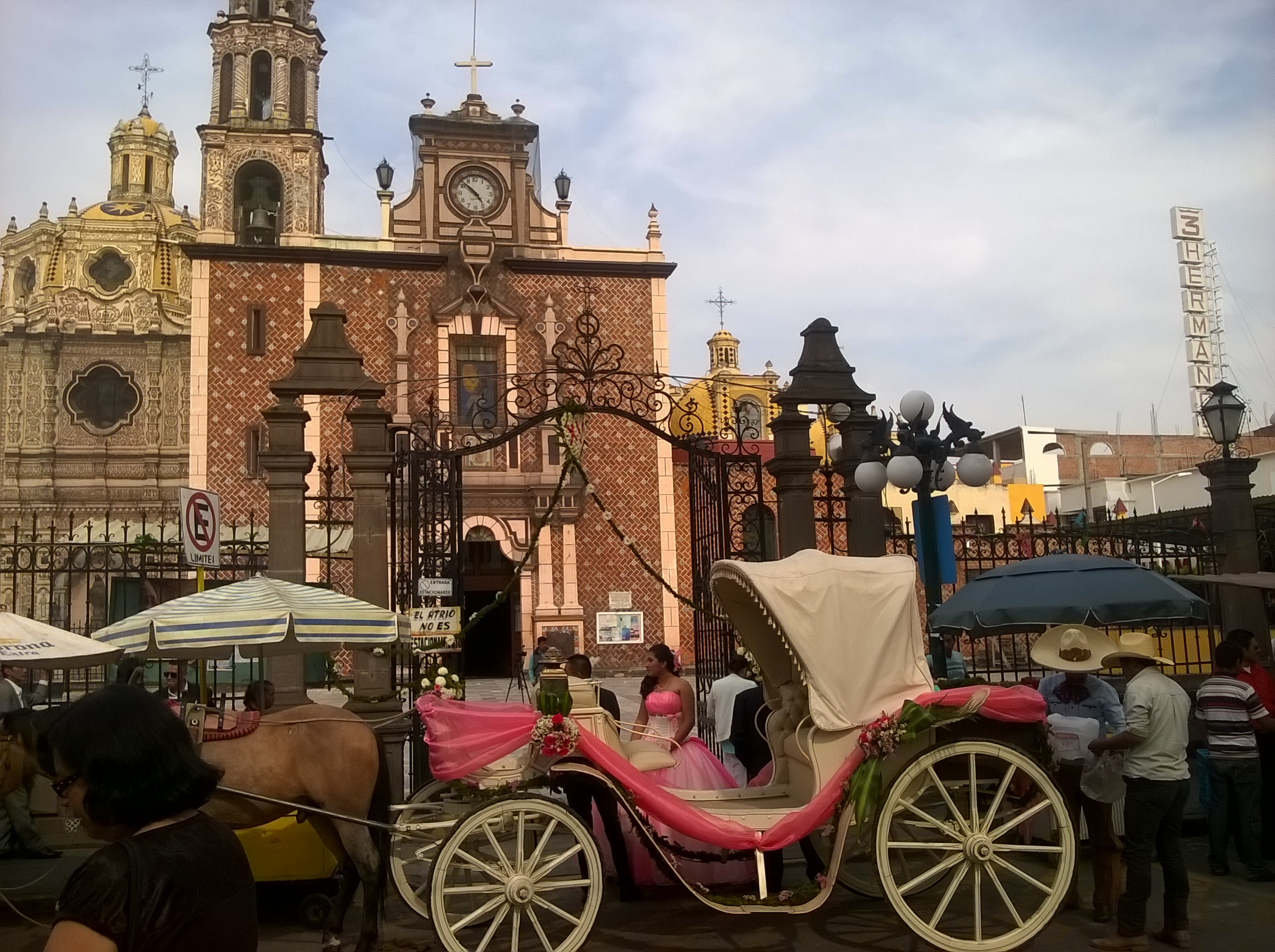
San Martín Texmelucan, third largest municipality by population

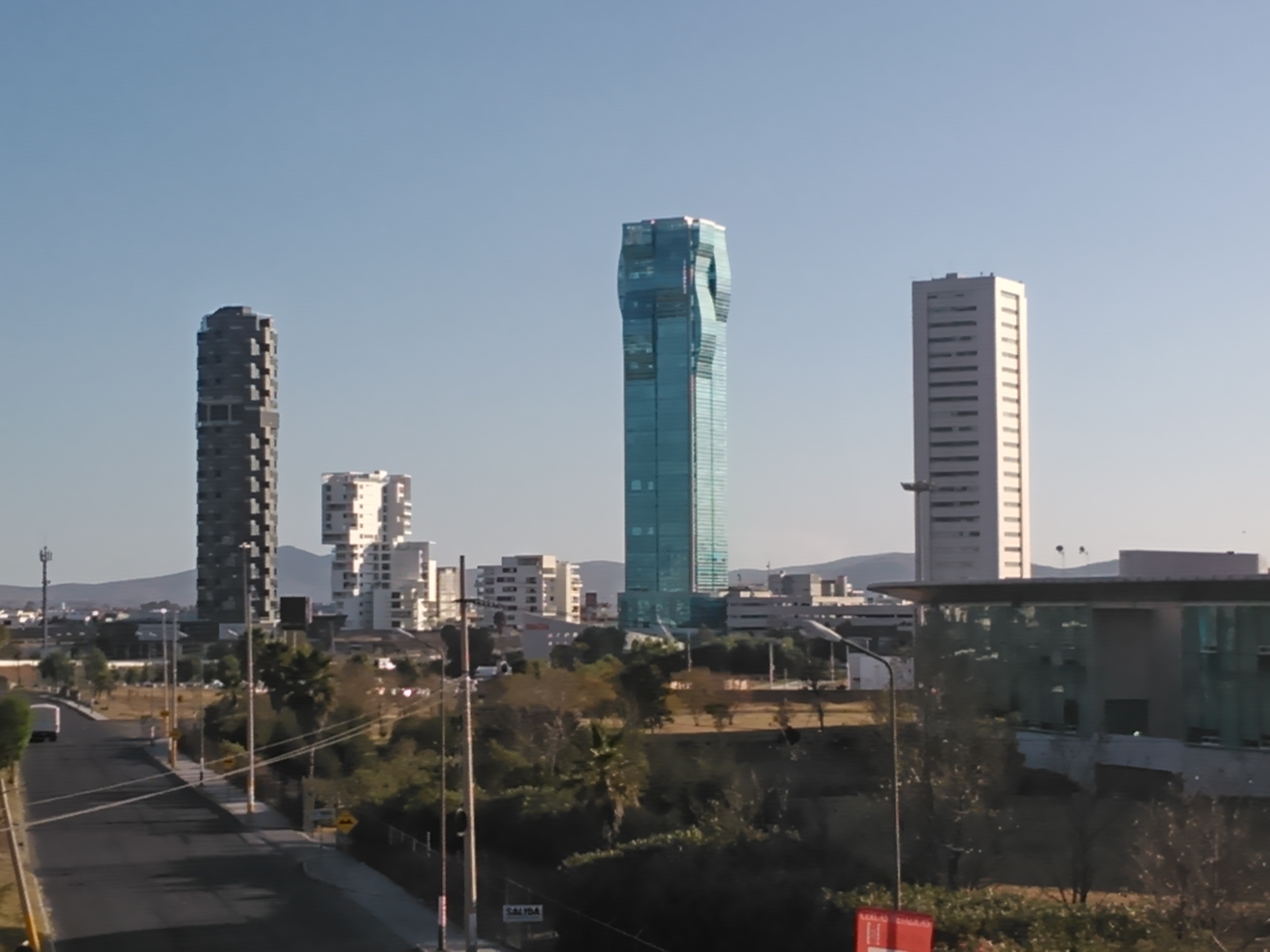
San Andrés Cholula, fourth largest municipality by population

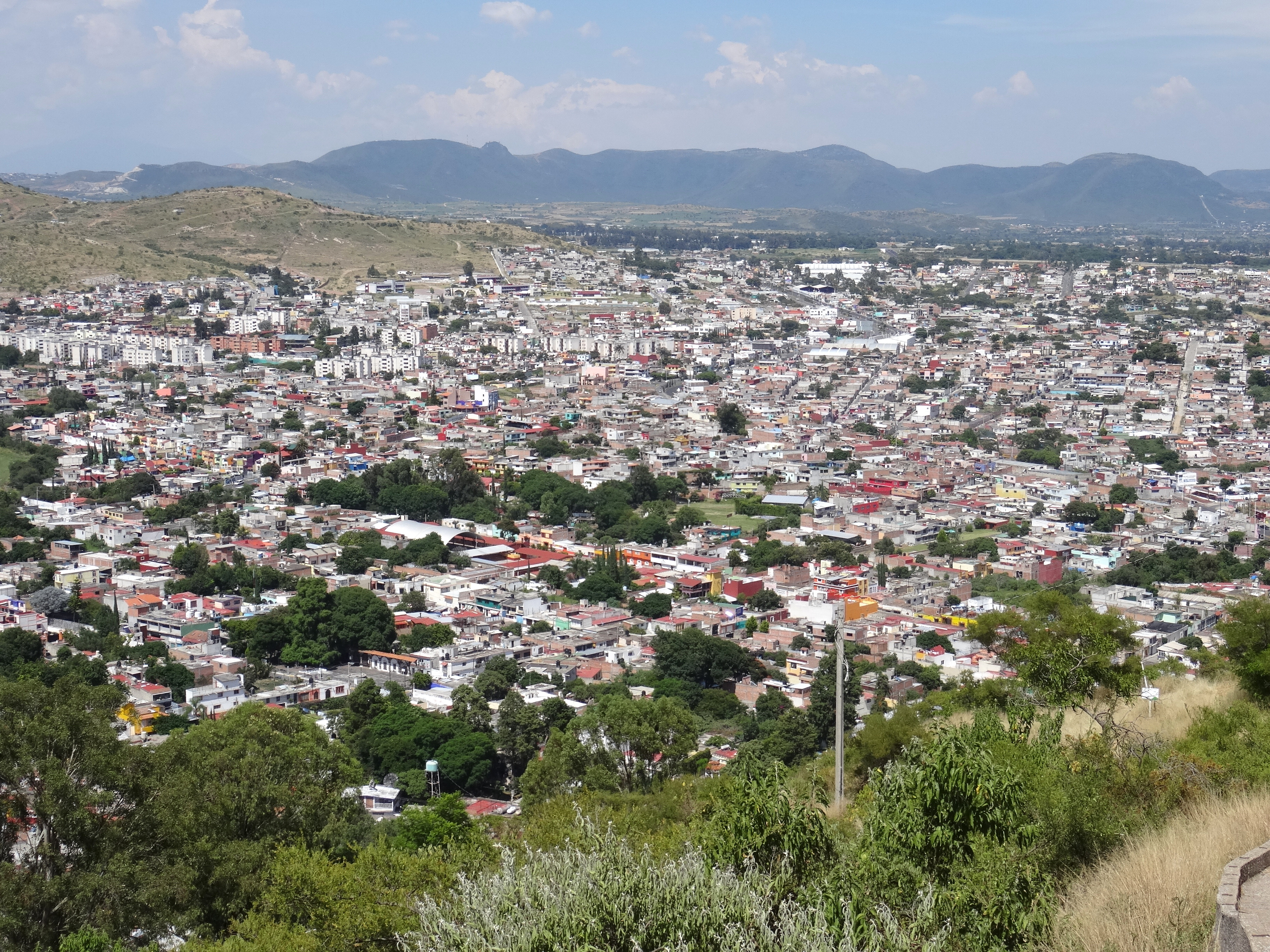
Atlixco, fifth largest municipality by population

† State capital

Municipalities of Puebla
Name	Municipal seat	Population (2020)	Population (2010)	Change	Land area		Population density (2020)	Incorporation date
Name	Municipal seat	Population (2020)	Population (2010)	Change	km^{2}	sq mi	Population density (2020)	Incorporation date
Acajete	Acajete	72,894	60,353	+20.8%	176.9	68.3	412.1/km^{2} (1,067.2/sq mi)	May 27, 1837
Acateno	Acateno	9,170	8,916	+2.8%	180.8	69.8	50.7/km^{2} (131.4/sq mi)	July 5, 1880
Acatlán	Acatlán de Osorio	37,955	33,865	+12.1%	608.5	234.9	62.4/km^{2} (161.5/sq mi)	March 22, 1824
Acatzingo	Acatzingo de Hidalgo	63,743	52,078	+22.4%	140.6	54.3	453.4/km^{2} (1,174.2/sq mi)	May 27, 1837
Acteopan	Acteopan	3,070	2,881	+6.6%	75.1	29.0	40.9/km^{2} (105.9/sq mi)	July 5, 1880
Ahuacatlán	Ahuacatlán	14,542	14,754	−1.4%	91.3	35.3	159.3/km^{2} (412.5/sq mi)	May 27, 1837
Ahuatlán	Ahuatlán	3,162	3,403	−7.1%	185.0	71.4	17.1/km^{2} (44.3/sq mi)	September 18, 1861
Ahuazotepec	Ahuazotepec	11,439	10,457	+9.4%	60.7	23.4	188.5/km^{2} (488.1/sq mi)	September 18, 1861
Ahuehuetitla	Ahuehuetitla	2,207	2,008	+9.9%	72.3	27.9	30.5/km^{2} (79.1/sq mi)	September 25, 1963
Ajalpan	Ajalpan	74,768	60,621	+23.3%	393.9	152.1	189.8/km^{2} (491.6/sq mi)	May 27, 1837
Albino Zertuche	Acaxtlahuacán	1,885	1,770	+6.5%	79.4	30.7	23.7/km^{2} (61.5/sq mi)	September 28, 1900
Aljojuca	Aljojuca	6,591	6,288	+4.8%	52.3	20.2	126.0/km^{2} (326.4/sq mi)	May 27, 1837
Altepexi	Altepexi	22,629	18,920	+19.6%	47.1	18.2	480.4/km^{2} (1,244.3/sq mi)	February 3, 1928
Amixtlán	Amixtlán	4,812	5,004	−3.8%	44.5	17.2	108.1/km^{2} (280.1/sq mi)	May 27, 1837
Amozoc	Amozoc de Mota	125,876	100,964	+24.7%	142.6	55.1	882.7/km^{2} (2,286.2/sq mi)	December 7, 1825
Aquixtla	Aquixtla	9,021	7,848	+14.9%	166.8	64.4	54.1/km^{2} (140.1/sq mi)	May 27, 1837
Atempan	Atempan	29,742	25,386	+17.2%	48.1	18.6	618.3/km^{2} (1,601.5/sq mi)	May 27, 1837
Atexcal	San Martín Atexcal	3,859	3,734	+3.3%	331.6	128.0	11.6/km^{2} (30.1/sq mi)	May 27, 1837
Atlequizayan (Note: Atlequizayan was named Ignacio Allende from 1934 to 1991.)	Atlequizayan	2,633	2,833	−7.1%	12.4	4.8	212.3/km^{2} (550.0/sq mi)	May 27, 1837
Atlixco	Atlixco	141,793	127,062	+11.6%	293.2	113.2	483.6/km^{2} (1,252.5/sq mi)	March 22, 1824
Atoyatempan	Atoyatempan	7,704	6,426	+19.9%	26.9	10.4	286.4/km^{2} (741.8/sq mi)	July 5, 1880
Atzala	Atzala	1,512	1,228	+23.1%	11.3	4.4	133.8/km^{2} (346.6/sq mi)	April 29, 1875
Atzitzihuacán	Santiago Atzitzihuacán	12,857	11,684	+10.0%	129.8	50.1	99.1/km^{2} (256.5/sq mi)	May 27, 1837
Atzitzintla (Note: Atzitzintla was merged with Chalchicomula from 1861 to 1880.)	Atzitzintla	9,051	8,408	+7.6%	133.1	51.4	68.0/km^{2} (176.1/sq mi)	May 27, 1837
Axutla	Axutla	976	947	+3.1%	188.2	72.7	5.2/km^{2} (13.4/sq mi)	October 9, 1923
Ayotoxco	Ayotoxco de Guerrero	8,208	8,153	+0.7%	106.7	41.2	76.9/km^{2} (199.2/sq mi)	December 27, 1921
Calpan	San Andrés Calpan	15,271	13,730	+11.2%	66.9	25.8	228.3/km^{2} (591.2/sq mi)	May 27, 1837
Caltepec	Caltepec	4,128	4,177	−1.2%	392.8	151.7	10.5/km^{2} (27.2/sq mi)	May 27, 1837
Camocuautla	Camocuautla	2,758	2,476	+11.4%	16.2	6.3	170.2/km^{2} (440.9/sq mi)	May 27, 1837
Cañada Morelos (Note: Cañada Morelos was originally incorporated as Morelos, changing its name on December 27, 1921.)	Morelos Cañada	20,659	18,954	+9.0%	244.6	94.4	84.5/km^{2} (218.8/sq mi)	May 27, 1837
Caxhuacan	Caxhuacan	3,811	3,791	+0.5%	14.0	5.4	272.2/km^{2} (705.0/sq mi)	January 2, 1951
Chalchicomula de Sesma	Ciudad Serdán	47,410	43,882	+8.0%	389.7	150.5	121.7/km^{2} (315.1/sq mi)	December 7, 1825
Chapulco	Chapulco	8,193	6,992	+17.2%	87.1	33.6	94.1/km^{2} (243.6/sq mi)	May 27, 1837
Chiautla	Chiautla de Tapia	21,699	19,037	+14.0%	804.2	310.5	27.0/km^{2} (69.9/sq mi)	March 22, 1824
Chiautzingo	San Lorenzo Chiautzingo	22,039	18,762	+17.5%	81.1	31.3	271.8/km^{2} (703.8/sq mi)	May 27, 1837
Chichiquila	Chichiquila	26,928	24,148	+11.5%	109.3	42.2	246.4/km^{2} (638.1/sq mi)	May 27, 1837
Chiconcuautla	Chiconcuautla	17,382	15,767	+10.2%	89.6	34.6	194.0/km^{2} (502.4/sq mi)	May 27, 1837
Chietla	Chietla	37,030	33,935	+9.1%	325.5	125.7	113.8/km^{2} (294.6/sq mi)	March 22, 1824
Chigmecatitlán	Chigmecatitlán	1,215	1,227	−1.0%	25.9	10.0	46.9/km^{2} (121.5/sq mi)	May 27, 1837
Chignahuapan	Chignahuapan	66,464	57,909	+14.8%	759.7	293.3	87.5/km^{2} (226.6/sq mi)	May 27, 1837
Chignautla	Chignautla	35,223	30,254	+16.4%	148.3	57.3	237.5/km^{2} (615.2/sq mi)	September 18, 1861
Chila	Chila	5,082	4,699	+8.2%	128.8	49.7	39.5/km^{2} (102.2/sq mi)	May 27, 1837
Chila de la Sal	Chila de la Sal	1,317	1,237	+6.5%	141.1	54.5	9.3/km^{2} (24.2/sq mi)	July 5, 1880
Chilchotla	Rafael J. García	21,002	19,257	+9.1%	145.9	56.3	143.9/km^{2} (372.8/sq mi)	September 18, 1861
Chinantla	Chinantla	2,846	2,468	+15.3%	88.5	34.2	32.2/km^{2} (83.3/sq mi)	September 18, 1861
Coatepec	Coatepec	772	758	+1.8%	12.3	4.7	62.8/km^{2} (162.6/sq mi)	September 23, 1930
Coatzingo	Coatzingo	2,820	2,964	−4.9%	115.1	44.4	24.5/km^{2} (63.5/sq mi)	December 11, 1874
Cohetzala	Santa María Cohetzala	1,382	1,283	+7.7%	240.7	92.9	5.7/km^{2} (14.9/sq mi)	May 27, 1837
Cohuecan	Cohuecan	5,403	4,763	+13.4%	47.5	18.3	113.7/km^{2} (294.6/sq mi)	July 5, 1880
Coronango	Santa María Coronango	46,836	34,596	+35.4%	36.7	14.2	1,276.2/km^{2} (3,305.3/sq mi)	May 27, 1837
Coxcatlán	Coxcatlán	20,653	19,639	+5.2%	249.3	96.3	82.8/km^{2} (214.6/sq mi)	May 27, 1837
Coyomeapan	Santa María Coyomeapan	14,806	14,205	+4.2%	228.7	88.3	64.7/km^{2} (167.7/sq mi)	May 27, 1837
Coyotepec	San Vicente Coyotepec	2,334	2,339	−0.2%	133.7	51.6	17.5/km^{2} (45.2/sq mi)	May 27, 1837
Cuapiaxtla	Cuapiaxtla de Madero	10,542	8,709	+21.0%	23.3	9.0	452.4/km^{2} (1,171.8/sq mi)	October 8, 1935
Cuautempan	San Esteban Cuautempan	9,837	9,212	+6.8%	61.3	23.7	160.5/km^{2} (415.6/sq mi)	July 5, 1880
Cuautinchán	Cuautinchán	12,340	9,538	+29.4%	160.3	61.9	77.0/km^{2} (199.4/sq mi)	May 27, 1837
Cuautlancingo	San Juan Cuautlancingo	137,435	79,153	+73.6%	38.1	14.7	3,607.2/km^{2} (9,342.7/sq mi)	July 5, 1880
Cuayuca	San Pedro Cuayuca	3,315	3,062	+8.3%	198.9	76.8	16.7/km^{2} (43.2/sq mi)	September 18, 1861
Cuetzalan del Progreso	Cuetzalan	49,864	47,433	+5.1%	181.7	70.2	274.4/km^{2} (710.8/sq mi)	May 27, 1837
Cuyoaco	Cuyoaco	17,139	15,367	+11.5%	301.3	116.3	56.9/km^{2} (147.3/sq mi)	May 27, 1837
Domingo Arenas	Domingo Arenas	7,982	6,946	+14.9%	16.1	6.2	495.8/km^{2} (1,284.1/sq mi)	May 12, 1942
Eloxochitlán	Eloxochitlán	14,461	12,575	+15.0%	99.6	38.5	145.2/km^{2} (376.0/sq mi)	May 27, 1837
Epatlán	San Juan Epatlán	4,943	4,594	+7.6%	52.1	20.1	94.9/km^{2} (245.7/sq mi)	May 27, 1837
Esperanza	Esperanza	14,766	13,785	+7.1%	79.3	30.6	186.2/km^{2} (482.3/sq mi)	February 3, 1928
Francisco Z. Mena	Metlaltoyuca	17,824	16,270	+9.6%	428.7	165.5	41.6/km^{2} (107.7/sq mi)	April 1, 1908
General Felipe Ángeles	San Pablo de las Tunas	22,694	19,040	+19.2%	91.5	35.3	248.0/km^{2} (642.4/sq mi)	September 18, 1923
Guadalupe	Guadalupe	6,451	6,276	+2.8%	155.0	59.8	41.6/km^{2} (107.8/sq mi)	April 25, 1922
Guadalupe Victoria	Guadalupe Victoria	18,784	16,551	+13.5%	228.1	88.1	82.3/km^{2} (213.3/sq mi)	June 22, 1928
Hermenegildo Galeana	Bienvenido	7,011	7,718	−9.2%	50.5	19.5	138.8/km^{2} (359.6/sq mi)	October 9, 1923
Honey (Note: Honey was originally incorporated as Chila Honey, changing its name on July 1, 1995.)	Honey	6,687	7,463	−10.4%	63.7	24.6	105.0/km^{2} (271.9/sq mi)	December 27, 1921
Huaquechula	Huaquechula	29,233	25,373	+15.2%	231.4	89.3	126.3/km^{2} (327.2/sq mi)	May 27, 1837
Huatlatlauca	Huatlatlauca	6,111	6,643	−8.0%	168.4	65.0	36.3/km^{2} (94.0/sq mi)	May 27, 1837
Huauchinango	Huauchinango	103,946	97,753	+6.3%	251.0	96.9	414.1/km^{2} (1,072.6/sq mi)	March 22, 1824
Huehuetla	Huehuetla	17,082	15,689	+8.9%	47.6	18.4	358.9/km^{2} (929.5/sq mi)	July 5, 1880
Huehuetlán el Chico	Huehuetlán el Chico	9,760	8,679	+12.5%	138.1	53.3	70.7/km^{2} (183.0/sq mi)	July 5, 1880
Huehuetlán el Grande (Note: Huehuetlán el Grande was originally incorporated as Santo Domingo Huehuetlán, changing its name on December 27, 1921.)	Santo Domingo Huehuetlán	6,105	7,060	−13.5%	180.4	69.7	33.8/km^{2} (87.6/sq mi)	May 27, 1837
Huejotzingo	Huejotzingo	90,794	63,457	+43.1%	173.0	66.8	524.8/km^{2} (1,359.3/sq mi)	March 22, 1824
Hueyapan	Hueyapan	13,080	11,868	+10.2%	74.8	28.9	174.9/km^{2} (452.9/sq mi)	September 18, 1861
Hueytamalco	Hueytamalco	27,600	26,689	+3.4%	319.1	123.2	86.5/km^{2} (224.0/sq mi)	September 18, 1861
Hueytlalpan	Hueytlalpan	5,951	5,734	+3.8%	42.1	16.3	141.4/km^{2} (366.1/sq mi)	May 27, 1837
Huitzilan de Serdán	Huitzilan	15,928	13,982	+13.9%	69.6	26.9	228.9/km^{2} (592.7/sq mi)	June 12, 1875
Huitziltepec	Santa Clara Huitziltepec	5,782	5,306	+9.0%	50.6	19.5	114.3/km^{2} (296.0/sq mi)	May 27, 1837
Ixcamilpa de Guerrero	Ixcamilpa	4,065	3,695	+10.0%	308.3	119.0	13.2/km^{2} (34.1/sq mi)	April 24, 1923
Ixcaquixtla	San Juan Ixcaquixtla	8,804	8,093	+8.8%	106.7	41.2	82.5/km^{2} (213.7/sq mi)	September 18, 1861
Ixtacamaxtitlán	Ixtacamaxtitlán	25,319	25,326	0.0%	561.7	216.9	45.1/km^{2} (116.7/sq mi)	May 27, 1837
Ixtepec	Ixtepec	6,950	6,811	+2.0%	19.6	7.6	354.6/km^{2} (918.4/sq mi)	March 3, 1942
Izúcar	Izúcar de Matamoros	82,809	72,799	+13.8%	537.0	207.3	154.2/km^{2} (399.4/sq mi)	March 22, 1824
Jalpan (Note: Jalpan was merged with Venustiano Carranza from 1951 to 1963.)	Jalpan	12,050	12,547	−4.0%	205.9	79.5	58.5/km^{2} (151.6/sq mi)	September 18, 1861
Jolalpan	Jolalpan	13,308	12,662	+5.1%	601.4	232.2	22.1/km^{2} (57.3/sq mi)	May 27, 1837
Jonotla	Jonotla	4,457	4,598	−3.1%	30.0	11.6	148.6/km^{2} (384.8/sq mi)	May 27, 1837
Jopala	Jopala	12,131	12,997	−6.7%	170.3	65.8	71.2/km^{2} (184.5/sq mi)	May 27, 1837
Juan C. Bonilla	Cuanalá	23,783	18,540	+28.3%	22.3	8.6	1,066.5/km^{2} (2,762.2/sq mi)	September 17, 1907
Juan Galindo	Nuevo Necaxa	9,828	10,213	−3.8%	23.0	8.9	427.3/km^{2} (1,106.7/sq mi)	October 6, 1936
Juan N. Méndez	Atenayuca	5,293	5,223	+1.3%	225.1	86.9	23.5/km^{2} (60.9/sq mi)	February 28, 1895
La Magdalena Tlatlauquitepec	La Magdalena Tlatlauquitepec	650	484	+34.3%	11.2	4.3	58.0/km^{2} (150.3/sq mi)	May 27, 1837
Lafragua	Saltillo	7,650	7,767	−1.5%	180.3	69.6	42.4/km^{2} (109.9/sq mi)	February 28, 1895
Libres (Note: Libres was originally incorporated as San Juan de los Llanos, changing its name on September 18, 1861.)	Ciudad de Libres	37,257	31,532	+18.2%	274.1	105.8	135.9/km^{2} (352.0/sq mi)	March 22, 1824
Los Reyes	Los Reyes de Juárez	30,021	25,553	+17.5%	30.8	11.9	974.7/km^{2} (2,524.5/sq mi)	May 27, 1837
Mazapiltepec	Mazapiltepec de Juárez	3,176	2,633	+20.6%	55.4	21.4	57.3/km^{2} (148.5/sq mi)	May 11, 1926
Mixtla	San Francisco Mixtla	2,668	2,216	+20.4%	9.5	3.7	280.8/km^{2} (727.4/sq mi)	July 5, 1880
Molcaxac	Molcaxac	6,668	6,218	+7.2%	156.7	60.5	42.6/km^{2} (110.2/sq mi)	May 27, 1837
Naupan	Naupan	9,310	9,707	−4.1%	61.1	23.6	152.4/km^{2} (394.6/sq mi)	May 27, 1837
Nauzontla	Nauzontla	3,317	3,598	−7.8%	27.6	10.7	120.2/km^{2} (311.3/sq mi)	July 5, 1880
Nealtican	San Buenaventura Nealtican	14,075	12,011	+17.2%	18.9	7.3	744.7/km^{2} (1,928.8/sq mi)	December 27, 1921
Nicolás Bravo	Nicolás Bravo	6,644	6,009	+10.6%	108.4	41.9	61.3/km^{2} (158.7/sq mi)	September 7, 1895
Nopalucan	Nopalucan	32,772	27,292	+20.1%	167.5	64.7	195.7/km^{2} (506.7/sq mi)	May 27, 1837
Ocotepec	Ocotepec	5,077	4,825	+5.2%	67.2	25.9	75.6/km^{2} (195.7/sq mi)	July 5, 1880
Ocoyucan	Santa Clara Ocoyucan	42,669	25,720	+65.9%	119.8	46.3	356.2/km^{2} (922.5/sq mi)	May 27, 1837
Olintla	Olintla	11,993	11,641	+3.0%	63.0	24.3	190.4/km^{2} (493.0/sq mi)	May 27, 1837
Oriental	Oriental	19,903	16,575	+20.1%	239.6	92.5	83.1/km^{2} (215.1/sq mi)	July 3, 1942
Pahuatlán	Pahuatlán de Valle	20,274	20,618	−1.7%	98.5	38.0	205.8/km^{2} (533.1/sq mi)	May 27, 1837
Palmar	Palmar de Bravo	50,226	42,887	+17.1%	362.3	139.9	138.6/km^{2} (359.1/sq mi)	May 27, 1837
Pantepec	Pantepec	18,528	18,435	+0.5%	220.3	85.1	84.1/km^{2} (217.8/sq mi)	May 27, 1837
Petlalcingo	Petlalcingo	9,350	9,382	−0.3%	232.9	89.9	40.1/km^{2} (104.0/sq mi)	May 27, 1837
Piaxtla	Piaxtla	4,627	4,585	+0.9%	221.2	85.4	20.9/km^{2} (54.2/sq mi)	May 27, 1837
Puebla	Puebla†	1,692,181	1,539,819	+9.9%	535.3	206.7	3,161.2/km^{2} (8,187.4/sq mi)	April 16, 1531
Quecholac	Quecholac	57,992	47,281	+22.7%	186.8	72.1	310.4/km^{2} (804.1/sq mi)	May 27, 1837
Quimixtlán	Quimixtlán	22,855	21,275	+7.4%	167.1	64.5	136.8/km^{2} (354.2/sq mi)	May 27, 1837
Rafael Lara Grajales	Rafael Lara Grajales	15,952	14,052	+13.5%	4.1	1.6	3,890.7/km^{2} (10,076.9/sq mi)	September 25, 1936
San Andrés Cholula	San Andrés Cholula	154,448	100,439	+53.8%	63.2	24.4	2,443.8/km^{2} (6,329.4/sq mi)	May 27, 1837
San Antonio Cañada	San Antonio Cañada	5,938	5,110	+16.2%	80.0	30.9	74.2/km^{2} (192.2/sq mi)	May 27, 1837
San Diego la Mesa Tochimiltzingo	Tochimiltzingo	1,270	1,132	+12.2%	133.0	51.4	9.5/km^{2} (24.7/sq mi)	December 5, 1941
San Felipe Teotlalcingo	San Felipe Teotlalcingo	11,063	9,426	+17.4%	39.4	15.2	280.8/km^{2} (727.2/sq mi)	August 8, 1933
San Felipe Tepatlán	San Felipe Tepatlán	3,793	4,120	−7.9%	45.2	17.5	83.9/km^{2} (217.3/sq mi)	July 27, 1931
San Gabriel Chilac	San Gabriel Chilac	15,954	14,454	+10.4%	109.3	42.2	146.0/km^{2} (378.0/sq mi)	April 26, 1871
San Gregorio Atzompa	San Gregorio Atzompa	9,671	8,170	+18.4%	11.8	4.6	819.6/km^{2} (2,122.7/sq mi)	December 27, 1921
San Jerónimo Tecuanipan	San Jerónimo Tecuanipan	6,597	5,826	+13.2%	39.8	15.4	165.8/km^{2} (429.3/sq mi)	July 5, 1880
San Jerónimo Xayacatlán	San Jerónimo Xayacatlán	3,606	3,777	−4.5%	143.0	55.2	25.2/km^{2} (65.3/sq mi)	September 18, 1861
San José Chiapa	San José Chiapa	10,443	8,087	+29.1%	177.0	68.3	59.0/km^{2} (152.8/sq mi)	May 27, 1837
San José Miahuatlán	San José Miahuatlán	14,018	12,699	+10.4%	335.3	129.5	41.8/km^{2} (108.3/sq mi)	May 27, 1837
San Juan Atenco	San Juan Atenco	3,604	3,416	+5.5%	96.3	37.2	37.4/km^{2} (96.9/sq mi)	September 27, 1932
San Juan Atzompa	San Juan Atzompa	975	872	+11.8%	24.7	9.5	39.5/km^{2} (102.2/sq mi)	December 27, 1921
San Martín Texmelucan	San Martín Texmelucan	155,738	141,112	+10.4%	89.6	34.6	1,738.1/km^{2} (4,501.8/sq mi)	May 27, 1837
San Martín Totoltepec	San Martín Totoltepec	692	651	+6.3%	7.2	2.8	96.1/km^{2} (248.9/sq mi)	April 4, 1922
San Matías Tlalancaleca	San Matías Tlalancaleca	20,974	19,310	+8.6%	50.7	19.6	413.7/km^{2} (1,071.4/sq mi)	July 13, 1926
San Miguel Ixitlán	San Miguel Ixitlán	526	586	−10.2%	72.8	28.1	7.2/km^{2} (18.7/sq mi)	April 20, 1926
San Miguel Xoxtla	San Miguel Xoxtla	12,461	11,598	+7.4%	8.3	3.2	1,501.3/km^{2} (3,888.4/sq mi)	September 24, 1940
San Nicolás Buenos Aires (Note: San Nicolas Buenos Aires was originally incorporated as Malpaís, changing its name on January 31, 1941.)	San Nicolás Buenos Aires	10,464	9,185	+13.9%	210.4	81.2	49.7/km^{2} (128.8/sq mi)	July 5, 1880
San Nicolás de los Ranchos	San Nicolás de los Ranchos	11,780	10,777	+9.3%	162.2	62.6	72.6/km^{2} (188.1/sq mi)	May 27, 1837
San Pablo Anicano	San Pablo Anicano	3,759	3,554	+5.8%	96.9	37.4	38.8/km^{2} (100.5/sq mi)	July 5, 1880
San Pedro Cholula	Cholula de Rivadavia	138,433	120,459	+14.9%	76.9	29.7	1,800.2/km^{2} (4,662.4/sq mi)	March 22, 1824
San Pedro Yeloixtlahuaca	San Pedro Yeloixtlahuaca	3,488	3,395	+2.7%	175.1	67.6	19.9/km^{2} (51.6/sq mi)	July 5, 1880
San Salvador el Seco	San Salvador el Seco	30,639	27,622	+10.9%	220.3	85.1	139.1/km^{2} (360.2/sq mi)	May 27, 1837
San Salvador el Verde	San Salvador el Verde	34,880	28,419	+22.7%	110.9	42.8	314.5/km^{2} (814.6/sq mi)	May 27, 1837
San Salvador Huixcolotla	San Salvador Huixcolotla	16,790	13,541	+24.0%	23.8	9.2	705.5/km^{2} (1,827.1/sq mi)	May 16, 1930
San Sebastián Tlacotepec (Note: San Sebastián Tlacotepec was originally incorporated as Porfirio Díaz, changing its name on December 27, 1921.)	Tlacotepec de Díaz	13,189	13,534	−2.5%	236.8	91.4	55.7/km^{2} (144.3/sq mi)	March 10, 1903
Santa Catarina Tlaltempan	Santa Catarina Tlaltempan	749	874	−14.3%	47.6	18.4	15.7/km^{2} (40.8/sq mi)	February 21, 1913
Santa Inés Ahuatempan	Santa Inés Ahuatempan	6,341	5,944	+6.7%	286.3	110.5	22.1/km^{2} (57.4/sq mi)	May 27, 1837
Santa Isabel Cholula	Santa Isabel Cholula	11,498	8,040	+43.0%	32.8	12.7	350.5/km^{2} (907.9/sq mi)	May 27, 1837
Santiago Miahuatlán	Santiago Miahuatlán	30,309	21,993	+37.8%	94.0	36.3	322.4/km^{2} (835.1/sq mi)	September 18, 1861
Santo Tomás Hueyotlipan	Santo Tomás Hueyotlipan	9,315	8,016	+16.2%	19.4	7.5	480.2/km^{2} (1,243.6/sq mi)	May 27, 1837
Soltepec	Soltepec	12,631	11,706	+7.9%	114.3	44.1	110.5/km^{2} (286.2/sq mi)	May 27, 1837
Tecali	Tecali de Herrera	23,625	20,267	+16.6%	175.7	67.8	134.5/km^{2} (348.3/sq mi)	March 22, 1824
Tecamachalco	Tecamachalco	80,771	71,571	+12.9%	180.4	69.7	447.7/km^{2} (1,159.6/sq mi)	May 27, 1837
Tecomatlán	Tecomatlán	6,830	5,420	+26.0%	145.2	56.1	47.0/km^{2} (121.8/sq mi)	May 27, 1837
Tehuacán	Tehuacán	327,312	274,906	+19.1%	553.0	213.5	591.9/km^{2} (1,533.0/sq mi)	March 22, 1824
Tehuitzingo	Tehuitzingo	12,672	11,328	+11.9%	491.7	189.8	25.8/km^{2} (66.7/sq mi)	May 27, 1837
Tenampulco	Tenampulco	6,743	6,772	−0.4%	140.3	54.2	48.1/km^{2} (124.5/sq mi)	June 12, 1875
Teopantlán	Teopantlán	3,836	4,024	−4.7%	248.7	96.0	15.4/km^{2} (39.9/sq mi)	May 27, 1837
Teotlalco	Teotlalco	3,689	3,121	+18.2%	136.7	52.8	27.0/km^{2} (69.9/sq mi)	May 27, 1837
Tepanco	Tepanco de López	22,218	19,002	+16.9%	224.8	86.8	98.8/km^{2} (256.0/sq mi)	May 27, 1837
Tepango	Tepango de Rodríguez	4,155	4,244	−2.1%	28.7	11.1	144.8/km^{2} (375.0/sq mi)	July 5, 1880
Tepatlaxco	Tepatlaxco de Hidalgo	18,854	16,275	+15.8%	61.3	23.7	307.6/km^{2} (796.6/sq mi)	July 13, 1926
Tepeaca	Tepeaca	84,270	74,708	+12.8%	217.5	84.0	387.4/km^{2} (1,003.5/sq mi)	March 22, 1824
Tepemaxalco (Note: Tepemaxalco was originally incorporated as Xicotzinco, changing its name on August 8, 1922.)	San Felipe Tepemaxalco	1,216	1,141	+6.6%	29.6	11.4	41.1/km^{2} (106.4/sq mi)	May 27, 1837
Tepeojuma	Tepeojuma	8,918	8,056	+10.7%	132.3	51.1	67.4/km^{2} (174.6/sq mi)	May 27, 1837
Tepetzintla	Tepetzintla	10,373	10,240	+1.3%	70.9	27.4	146.3/km^{2} (378.9/sq mi)	May 27, 1837
Tepexco	Tepexco	7,523	6,580	+14.3%	116.2	44.9	64.7/km^{2} (167.7/sq mi)	May 27, 1837
Tepexi	Tepexi de Rodríguez	22,331	20,478	+9.0%	392.1	151.4	57.0/km^{2} (147.5/sq mi)	March 22, 1824
Tepeyahualco	Tepeyahualco	19,200	16,390	+17.1%	450.6	174.0	42.6/km^{2} (110.4/sq mi)	May 27, 1837
Tepeyahualco de Cuauhtémoc (Note: Tepeyahualco de Cuauhtémoc was originally incorporated as Cuauhtémoc, changing its name on December 27, 1921.)	Tepeyahualco de Cuauhtémoc	3,851	3,365	+14.4%	15.6	6.0	246.9/km^{2} (639.4/sq mi)	March 22, 1912
Tetela	Tetela de Ocampo	27,216	25,793	+5.5%	328.6	126.9	82.8/km^{2} (214.5/sq mi)	March 22, 1824
Teteles	Teteles de Ávila Castillo	6,653	5,689	+16.9%	9.8	3.8	678.9/km^{2} (1,758.3/sq mi)	July 5, 1880
Teziutlán	Teziutlán	103,583	92,246	+12.3%	92.5	35.7	1,119.8/km^{2} (2,900.3/sq mi)	March 22, 1824
Tianguismanalco	Tianguismanalco	14,432	9,807	+47.2%	133.3	51.5	108.3/km^{2} (280.4/sq mi)	May 27, 1837
Tilapa	Tilapa	9,664	8,401	+15.0%	83.6	32.3	115.6/km^{2} (299.4/sq mi)	May 27, 1837
Tlachichuca	Tlachichuca	31,639	28,568	+10.7%	421.4	162.7	75.1/km^{2} (194.5/sq mi)	September 18, 1861
Tlacotepec	Tlacotepec de Benito Juárez	54,757	48,268	+13.4%	396.4	153.1	138.1/km^{2} (357.8/sq mi)	May 27, 1837
Tlacuilotepec	Tlacuilotepec	15,977	17,115	−6.6%	173.3	66.9	92.2/km^{2} (238.8/sq mi)	May 27, 1837
Tlahuapan	Santa Rita Tlahuapan	41,547	36,518	+13.8%	313.9	121.2	132.4/km^{2} (342.8/sq mi)	July 5, 1880
Tlaltenango	Tlaltenango	7,425	6,269	+18.4%	21.5	8.3	345.3/km^{2} (894.4/sq mi)	July 5, 1880
Tlanepantla	Tlanepantla	5,390	4,833	+11.5%	14.9	5.8	361.7/km^{2} (936.9/sq mi)	December 2, 1872
Tlaola	Tlaola	20,433	19,826	+3.1%	143.0	55.2	142.9/km^{2} (370.1/sq mi)	May 27, 1837
Tlapacoya	Tlapacoya	6,422	6,406	+0.2%	63.3	24.4	101.5/km^{2} (262.8/sq mi)	May 27, 1837
Tlapanalá	Tlapanalá	10,344	8,404	+23.1%	83.8	32.4	123.4/km^{2} (319.7/sq mi)	September 18, 1861
Tlatlauquitepec	Tlatlauquitepec	55,576	51,495	+7.9%	294.1	113.6	189.0/km^{2} (489.4/sq mi)	May 27, 1837
Tlaxco	Tlaxco	4,934	5,415	−8.9%	54.8	21.2	90.0/km^{2} (233.2/sq mi)	December 27, 1921
Tochimilco	Tochimilco	19,315	17,028	+13.4%	219.0	84.6	88.2/km^{2} (228.4/sq mi)	March 22, 1824
Tochtepec	Tochtepec	22,454	19,701	+14.0%	101.9	39.3	220.4/km^{2} (570.7/sq mi)	May 27, 1837
Totoltepec	Totoltepec de Guerrero	1,187	1,155	+2.8%	155.4	60.0	7.6/km^{2} (19.8/sq mi)	May 27, 1837
Tulcingo	Tulcingo del Valle	9,871	9,245	+6.8%	277.8	107.3	35.5/km^{2} (92.0/sq mi)	July 5, 1880
Tuzamapan	Tuzamapan de Galeana	5,924	5,983	−1.0%	41.9	16.2	141.4/km^{2} (366.2/sq mi)	May 27, 1837
Tzicatlacoyan	Tzicatlacoyan	6,476	6,242	+3.7%	278.8	107.6	23.2/km^{2} (60.2/sq mi)	May 27, 1837
Venustiano Carranza	Venustiano Carranza	28,395	27,890	+1.8%	316.5	122.2	89.7/km^{2} (232.4/sq mi)	August 31, 1951
Vicente Guerrero	Santa María del Monte	26,559	24,217	+9.7%	261.3	100.9	101.6/km^{2} (263.3/sq mi)	December 27, 1921
Xayacatlán	Xayacatlán de Bravo	1,570	1,649	−4.8%	60.3	23.3	26.0/km^{2} (67.4/sq mi)	December 27, 1921
Xicotepec	Xicotepec de Juárez	80,591	75,601	+6.6%	312.5	120.7	257.9/km^{2} (667.9/sq mi)	May 27, 1837
Xicotlán	Xicotlán	1,312	1,241	+5.7%	204.7	79.0	6.4/km^{2} (16.6/sq mi)	May 27, 1837
Xiutetelco	San Juan Xiutetelco	42,943	37,910	+13.3%	145.9	56.3	294.3/km^{2} (762.3/sq mi)	September 18, 1861
Xochiapulco	Cinco de Mayo	3,443	3,911	−12.0%	60.2	23.2	57.2/km^{2} (148.1/sq mi)	September 18, 1861
Xochiltepec	Xochiltepec	3,375	3,187	+5.9%	46.6	18.0	72.4/km^{2} (187.6/sq mi)	July 5, 1880
Xochitlán de Vicente Suárez	Xochitlán de Vicente Suárez	13,025	12,249	+6.3%	78.4	30.3	166.1/km^{2} (430.3/sq mi)	May 27, 1837
Xochitlán Todos Santos	Xochitlán	7,178	6,049	+18.7%	163.6	63.2	43.9/km^{2} (113.6/sq mi)	May 27, 1837
Yaonáhuac	Yaonáhuac	7,926	7,514	+5.5%	29.6	11.4	267.8/km^{2} (693.5/sq mi)	September 18, 1861
Yehualtepec	Yehualtepec	26,392	22,976	+14.9%	127.8	49.3	206.5/km^{2} (534.9/sq mi)	May 27, 1837
Zacapala	Zacapala	4,647	4,224	+10.0%	247.8	95.7	18.8/km^{2} (48.6/sq mi)	September 18, 1861
Zacapoaxtla	Zacapoaxtla	57,887	53,295	+8.6%	176.5	68.1	328.0/km^{2} (849.4/sq mi)	December 7, 1825
Zacatlán	Zacatlán	87,361	76,296	+14.5%	489.2	188.9	178.6/km^{2} (462.5/sq mi)	March 22, 1824
Zapotitlán	Zapotitlán Salinas	8,595	8,220	+4.6%	429.3	165.8	20.0/km^{2} (51.9/sq mi)	May 27, 1837
Zapotitlán de Méndez	Zapotitlán de Méndez	5,675	5,608	+1.2%	20.3	7.8	279.6/km^{2} (724.0/sq mi)	May 27, 1837
Zaragoza	Zaragoza	16,752	15,444	+8.5%	30.8	11.9	543.9/km^{2} (1,408.7/sq mi)	October 9, 1923
Zautla	Santiago Zautla	20,717	19,438	+6.6%	266.7	103.0	77.7/km^{2} (201.2/sq mi)	May 27, 1837
Zihuateutla	Zihuateutla	11,967	12,530	−4.5%	176.2	68.0	67.9/km^{2} (175.9/sq mi)	May 27, 1837
Zinacatepec (Note: Zinacatepec was merged with Tehuacán from 1861 to 1871.)	San Sebastián Zinacatepec	18,359	15,690	+17.0%	62.8	24.2	292.3/km^{2} (757.2/sq mi)	May 27, 1837
Zongozotla	Zongozotla	4,539	4,599	−1.3%	36.5	14.1	124.4/km^{2} (322.1/sq mi)	July 5, 1880
Zoquiapan	Zoquiapan	2,452	2,639	−7.1%	19.2	7.4	127.7/km^{2} (330.8/sq mi)	July 5, 1880
Zoquitlán	Zoquitlán	20,335	20,529	−0.9%	269.3	104.0	75.5/km^{2} (195.6/sq mi)	May 27, 1837
Puebla	—	6,583,278	5,779,829	+13.9%	34,309.6	13,247.0	191.9/km^{2} (497.0/sq mi)	—
Mexico	—	126,014,024	112,336,538	+12.2%	1,960,646.7	757,010	64.3/km^{2} (166.5/sq mi)	—
