= Tepatlaxco de Hidalgo =

Coordinates: 19°04′N 97°58′W

- Municipality and town
- Interactive map of Tepatlaxco de Hidalgo
- Country: Mexico
- State: Puebla
- Time zone: UTC-6 (Zona Centro)

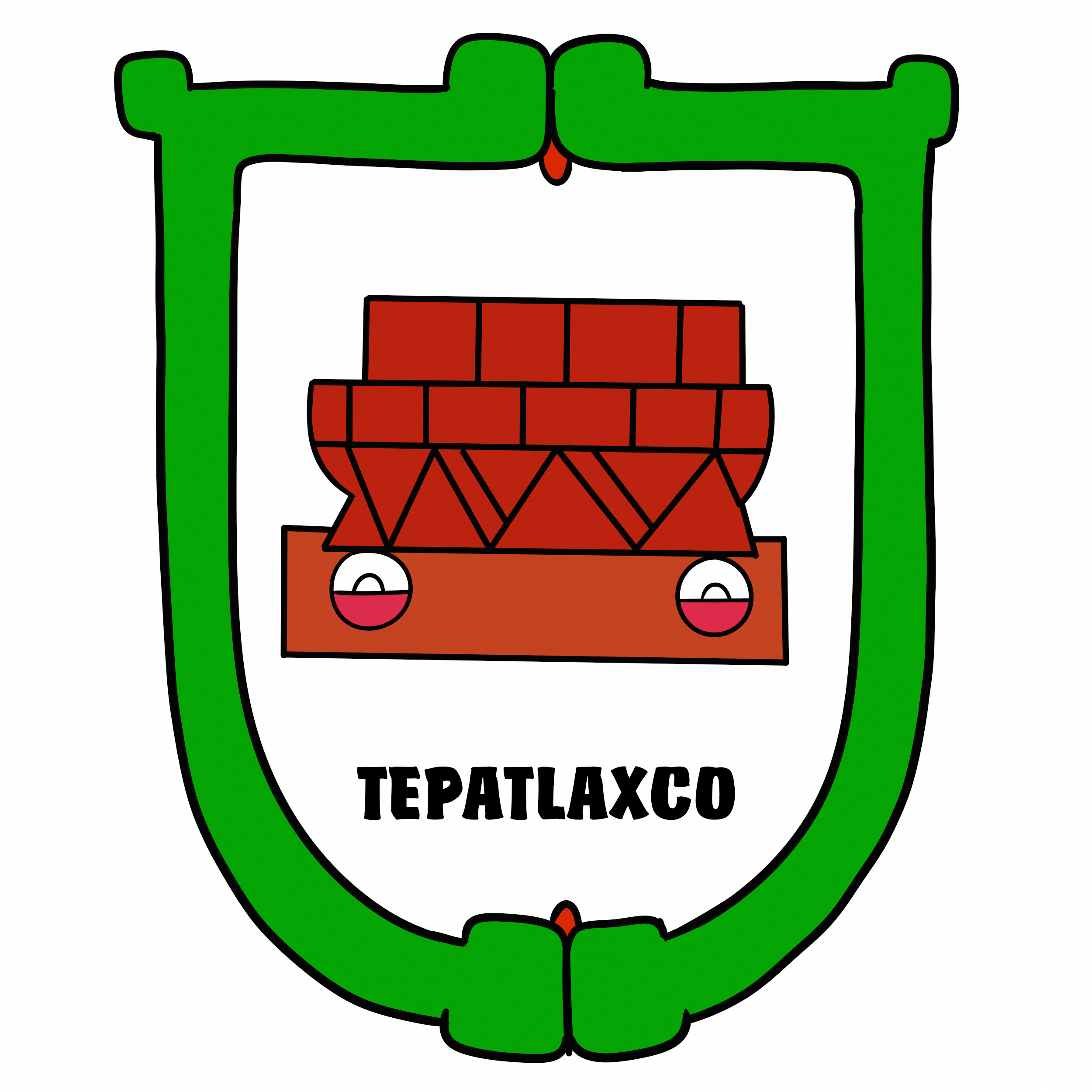
Coat of Arms of Tepatlaxco de Hidalgo

Tepatlaxco de Hidalgo is a town and municipality in the Mexican state of Puebla.
