= General Felipe Ángeles =

Coordinates: 23°55′N 104°36′W

- Municipality and town
- Location of the municipality in Puebla
- Country: Mexico
- State: Puebla

Population (2020)
  - Total: 22,694
- Time zone: UTC-6 (Zona Centro)

General Felipe Ángeles is a town and municipality in the center of the state of Puebla. It is named after General Felipe Ángeles.

Municipal President Miguel Antonio Vázquez died on August 24, 2020, during the COVID-19 pandemic in Mexico.
