= Atexcal =

Coordinates: 18.0000°N 97.0000°W

- Municipality and town
- Coat of arms
- Interactive map of Atexcal
- Country: Mexico
- State: Puebla
- Time zone: UTC-6 (Zona Centro)

Atexcal is a town and municipality in the Mexican state of Puebla.

== Image gallery ==
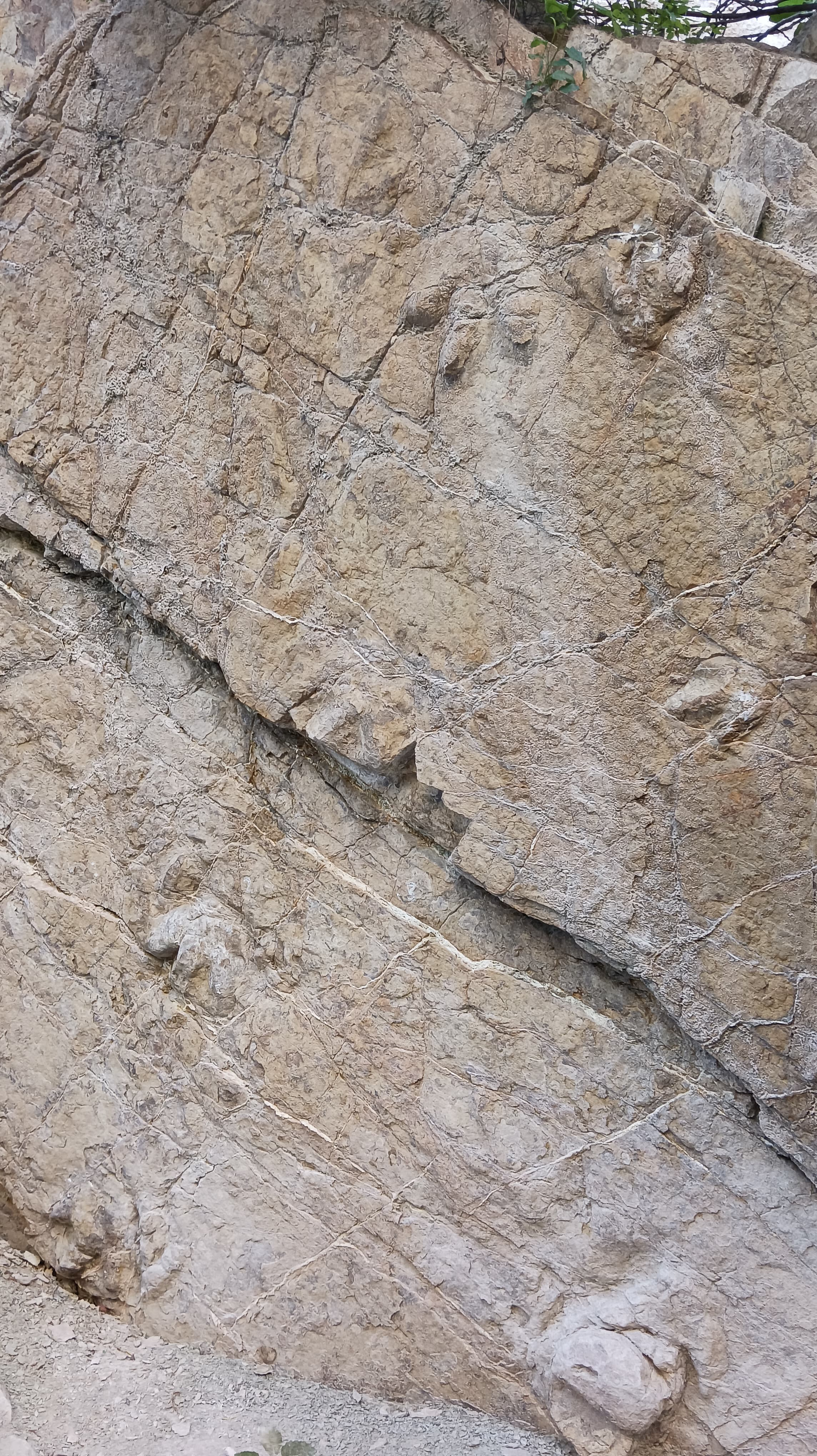
Dinosaur track in San Martín Atexcal

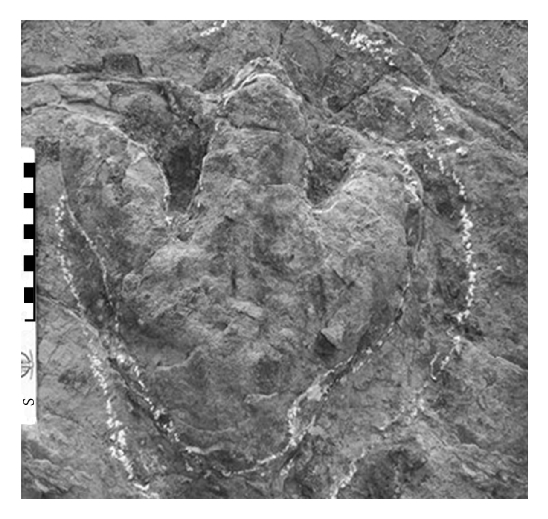
Iguanodontid footprint in Atexcal
