= Oriental, Puebla =

Coordinates: 19°22′N 97°37′W

Oriental
- Municipality and town
- Coat of arms

- Location of the municipality in Puebla
- Country: Mexico
- State: Puebla
- Time zone: UTC-6 (Zona Centro)

Oriental is a town and municipality in the Mexican state of Puebla.
