= San Nicolás de Los Ranchos =

Coordinates: 19°04′N 98°29′W

- Municipality and town
- Church of Saint Nicholas of Bari
- Interactive map of San Nicolás de Los Ranchos
- Country: Mexico
- State: Puebla
- Time zone: UTC-6 (Zona Centro)

San Nicolás de Los Ranchos is a town and municipality in the Mexican state of Puebla.
