= Chapulco =

- Municipality
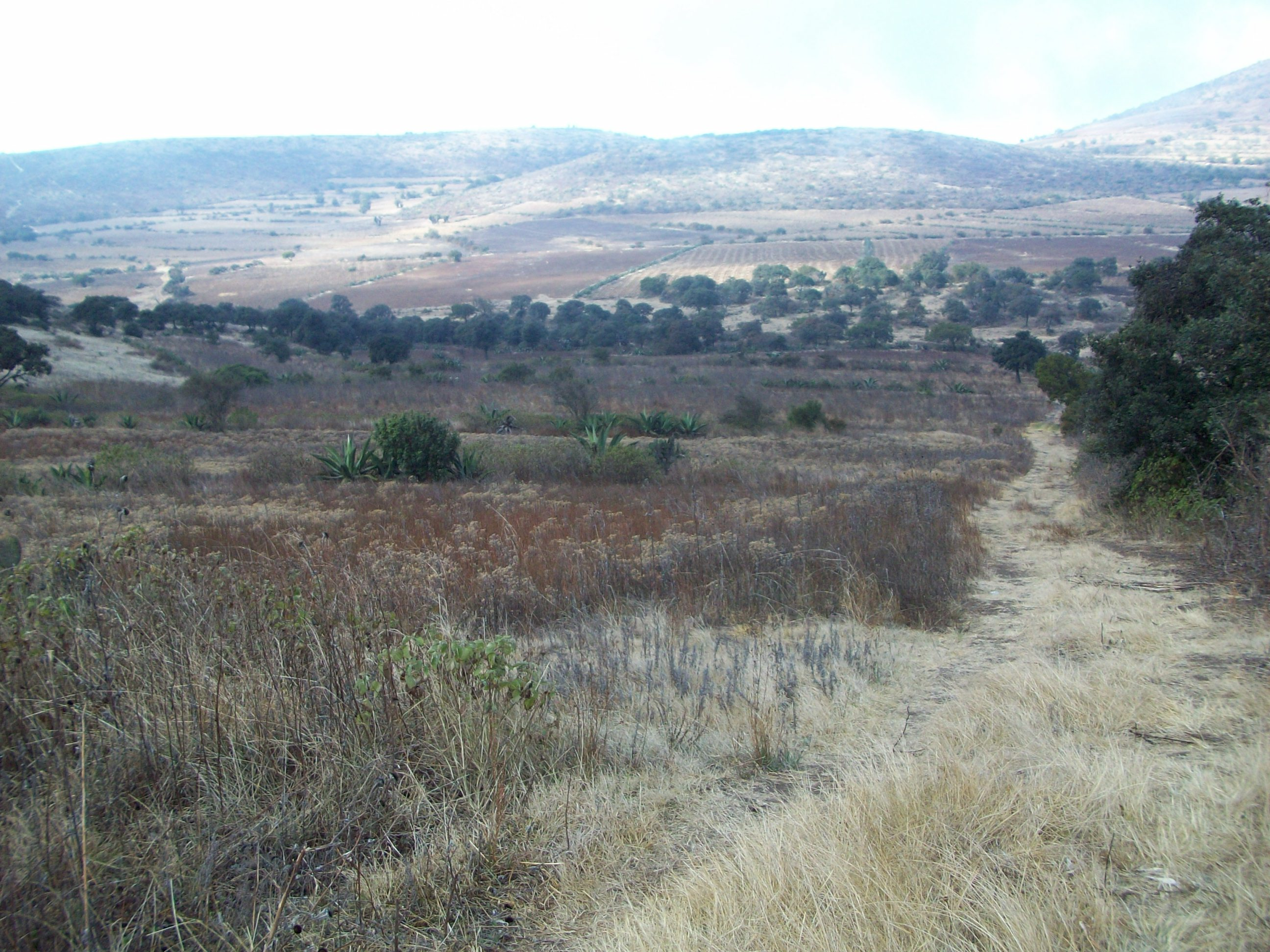

- Location of the municipality in Puebla
- Coordinates: 18°37′13″N 97°24′38″W
- Country: Mexico
- State: Puebla
- Time zone: UTC-6 (Zona Centro)

Chapulco is a municipality in the Mexican state of Puebla.

The name derives from Nahuatl Chiapolco. In the prehispanic period, Chapulco was an autonomous village-state inhabited by Popoloca-speakers.
