= Santo Tomás Hueyotlipan =

Municipal seat of Santo Tomás Hueyotlipan, State of Puebla, Mexico

Coordinates: 18°54′N 97°51′W

Santo Tomás Hueyotlipan is the municipal seat of Santo Tomás Hueyotlipan Municipality, Puebla, Mexico.
