= Mazapiltepec de Juárez =

Coordinates: 19°07′N 97°41′W

- Municipality and town
- Interactive map of Mazapiltepec de Juárez
- Country: Mexico
- State: Puebla
- Time zone: UTC-6 (Zona Centro)

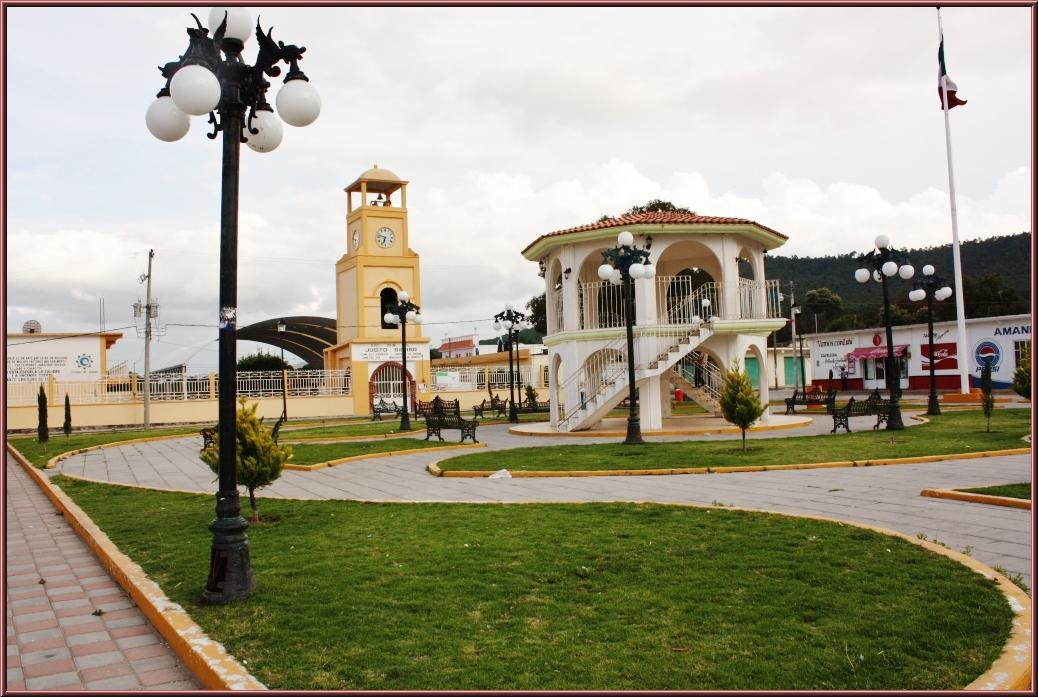
Templo de Santa Margarita (Temple of Saint Margaret) in Mazapiltepec

Mazapiltepec de Juárez is a town and municipality in the Mexican state of Puebla.
