= Acateno =

- Municipality
- Coat of arms

- Location within Mexico Location within Puebla (state)
- Coordinates: 20°07′47.7″N 97°12′36.9″W
- Country: Mexico
- State: Puebla

Government
  - Mayor: Diego Torre

Area
  - Total: 180.8 km^{2} (69.8 sq mi)

Population (March 15, 2020)
  - Total: 9,170
  - Density: 50.72/km^{2} (131.4/sq mi)
- Time zone: UTC−06:00
- Postal code: 73590–73598
- MCN: 21002
- Website: Official website

Acateno is municipality in the Mexican state of Puebla. The municipal seat lies at San José Atenco.

In the 2020 Census, the municipality reported a population of 9,170, up 2.85% from 2010.
