= Chila (municipality) =

- Municipality
- Coat of arms

- Location of the municipality in Puebla
- Country: Mexico
- State: Puebla

Population (2020)
  - Total: 5,082
- Time zone: UTC-6 (Central)
- Website: chiladelasflores.gob.mx

Chila (Mixtec: Toavui) is a municipality in the state of Puebla in eastern Mexico. In 2020, the municipality had a population of 5,082.
