= Tlahuapan =

Coordinates: 19°19′52″N 98°34′54″W

- Municipality and town
- Interactive map of Tlahuapan
- Country: Mexico
- State: Puebla
- Time zone: UTC-6 (Zona Centro)

Tlahuapan is a town and municipality in the Mexican state of Puebla.
