= Tetela de Ocampo (municipality) =

Municipality in Puebla, Mexico

Coordinates: 19.8167°N 97.8000°W

- Municipality
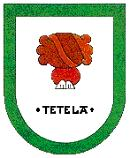
- Coat of arms
- Interactive map of Tetela de Ocampo
- Country: Mexico
- State: Puebla
- Time zone: UTC-6 (Zona Centro)

Tetela de Ocampo is a municipality in the Mexican state of Puebla.
