= Tlanepantla =

Coordinates: 18.8662°N 97.8854°W

- Municipality
- Interactive map of Tlanepantla
- Country: Mexico
- State: Puebla
- Time zone: UTC-6 (Zona Centro)

Tlanepantla is a municipality in the Mexican state of Puebla.
