= Chichiquila =

Coordinates: 19°11′N 97°02′W

- Municipality
- Coat of arms

- Location of the municipality in Puebla
- Country: Mexico
- State: Puebla
- Time zone: UTC-6 (Zona Centro)

Chichiquila is a municipality in the Mexican state of Puebla.
