= Palmar de Bravo =

Coordinates: 18°50′N 97°34′W

- Municipality and town
- Interactive map of Palmar de Bravo
- Country: Mexico
- State: Puebla

Population (2020)
  - Total: 50,226
- Time zone: UTC-6 (Zona Centro)

Palmar de Bravo is a town and municipality in the Mexican state of Puebla.
