= Zoquitlán =

Coordinates: 18°20′N 97°01′W

- Municipality and town
- Coat of arms
- Interactive map of Zoquitlán
- Country: Mexico
- State: Puebla
- Time zone: UTC-6 (Zona Centro)

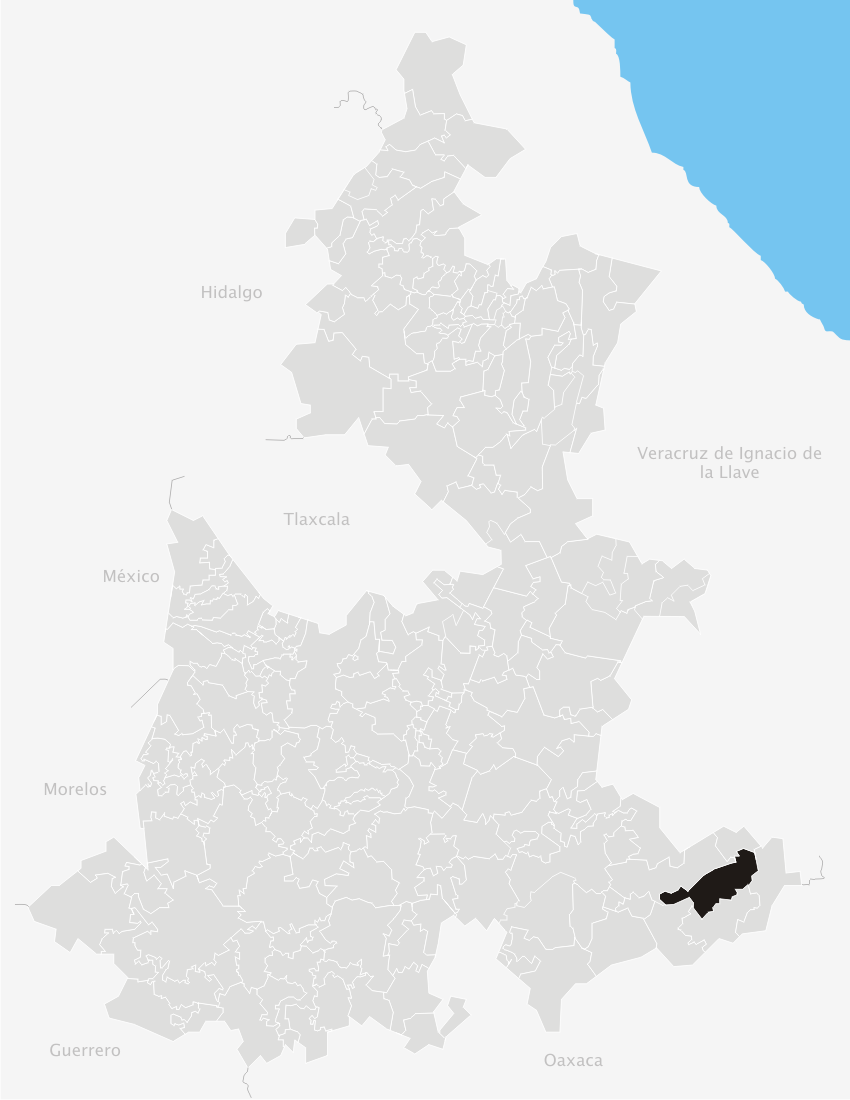

Zoquitlán is a town and municipality in the Mexican state of Puebla.
