= San Salvador el Seco =

Coordinates: 19°08′N 97°39′W

- Municipality and town
- Interactive map of San Salvador el Seco
- Country: Mexico
- State: Puebla
- Time zone: UTC-6 (Zona Centro)

San Salvador el Seco is a town and municipality in the Mexican state of Puebla.
