= Atzitzintla =

Coordinates: 18°54′N 97°19′W

- Municipality and town
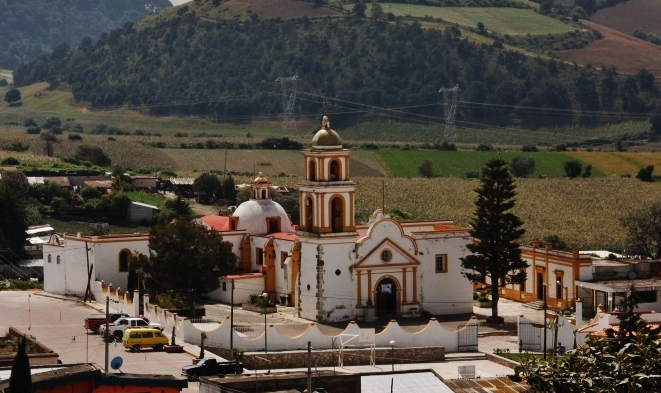

- Coat of arms
- Interactive map of Atzitzintla
- Country: Mexico
- State: Puebla
- Time zone: UTC-6 (Zona Centro)

Atzitzintla is a town and municipality in the Mexican state of Puebla.
