= Tepanco de López =

Coordinates: 18°34′N 97°33′W

- Municipality and town
- Interactive map of Tepanco de López
- Country: Mexico
- State: Puebla
- Time zone: UTC-6 (Zona Centro)

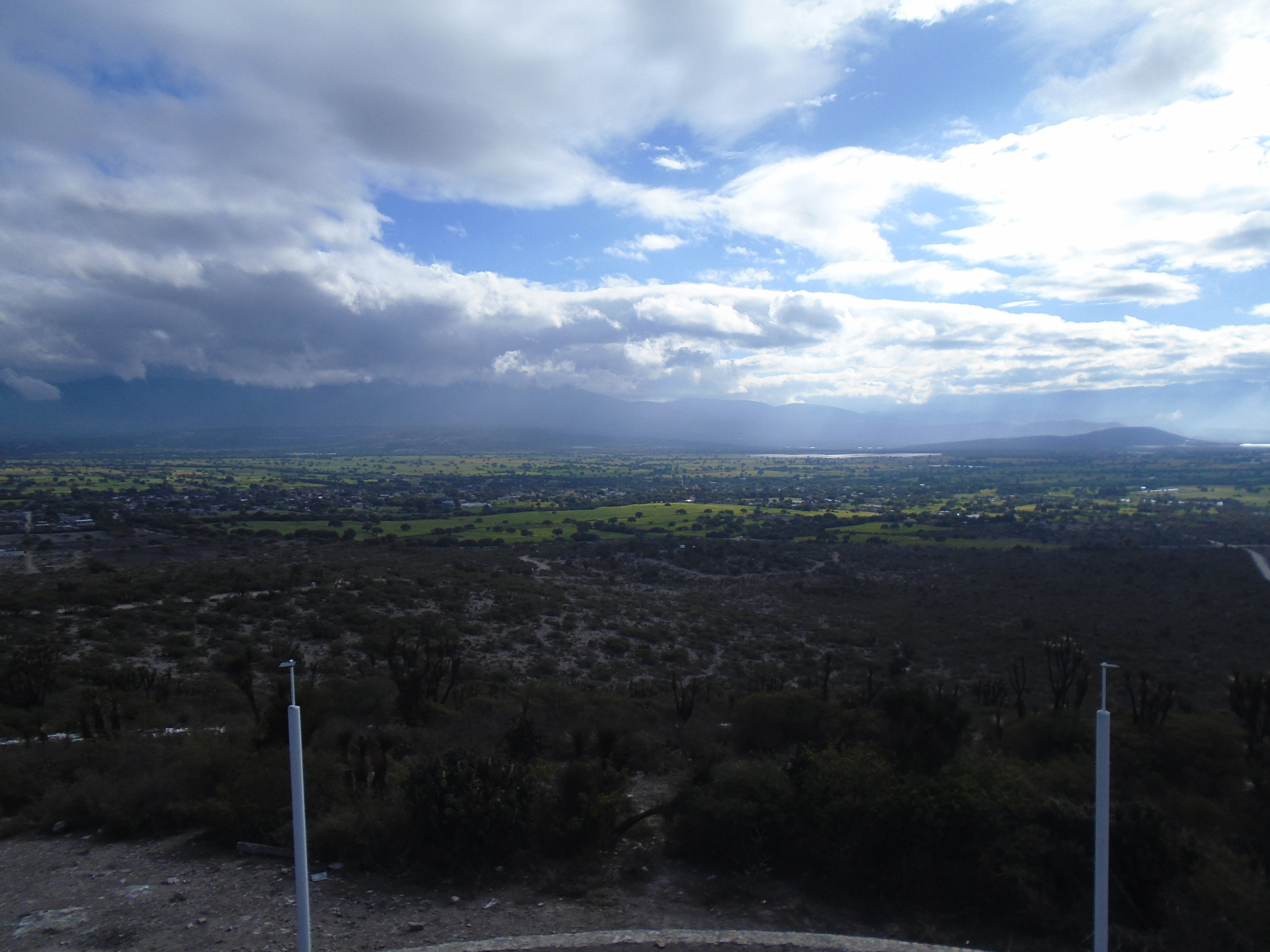
The Cerro del Cococpaltce/ "Christ the King" hill located in Tepanco de López

Tepanco de López is a town and municipality in the Mexican state of Puebla.
