= Acteopan =

Coordinates: 18°45′N 98°43′W

- Municipality
- Coat of arms

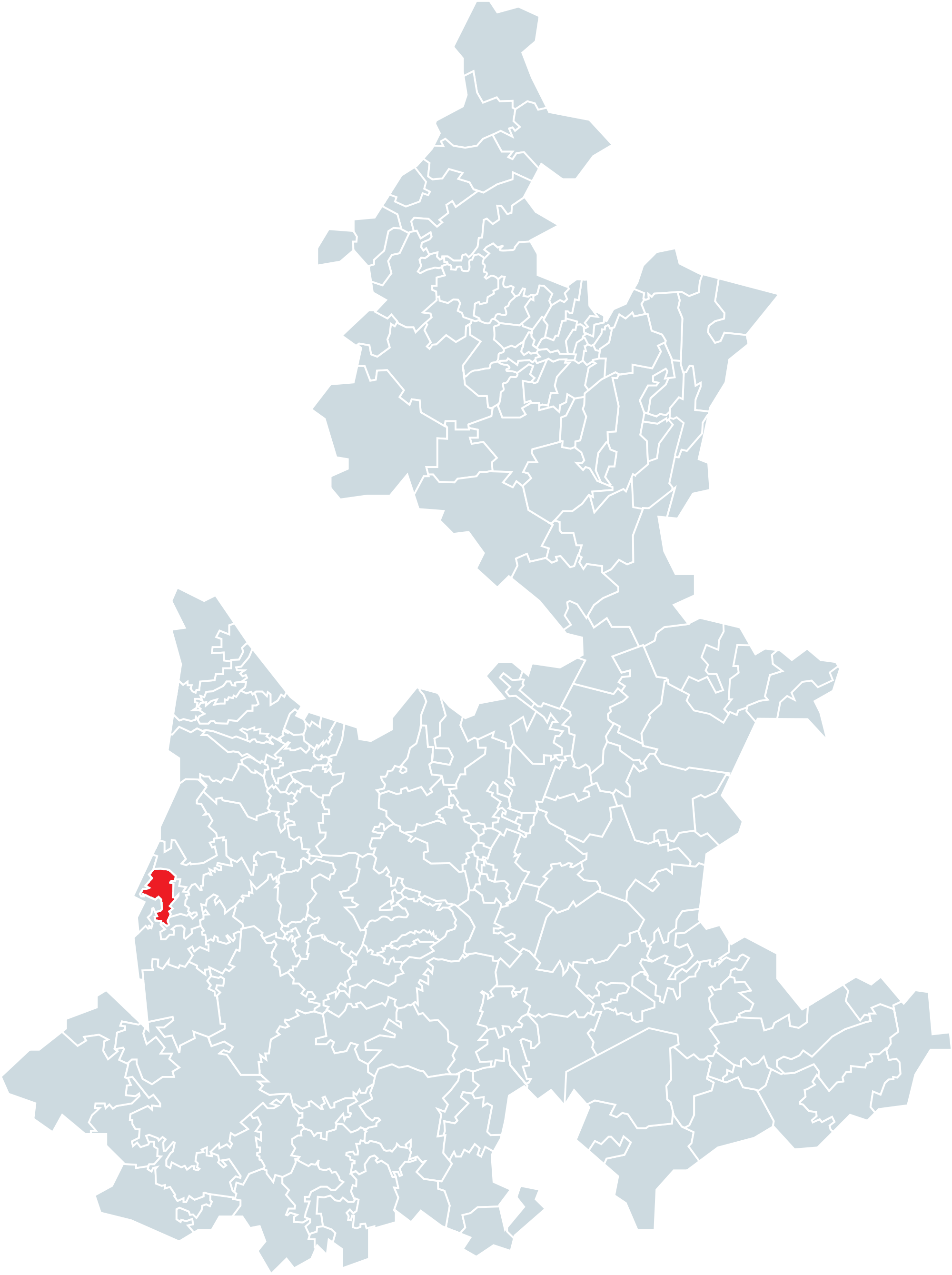
- Location of the municipality in Puebla
- Country: Mexico
- State: Puebla
- Time zone: UTC-6 (Zona Centro)

Acteopan is a municipality in the Mexican state of Puebla.
