= Chiautzingo Municipality =

Coordinates: 19°12′N 98°28′W

Chiautzingo
- Municipality
- Coat of arms

- Location of the municipality in Puebla
- Country: Mexico
- State: Puebla
- Time zone: UTC-6 (Zona Centro)

Chiautzingo is a municipality in the Mexican state of Puebla.
