= Nealtican =

Coordinates: 19°03′N 98°25′W

- Municipality
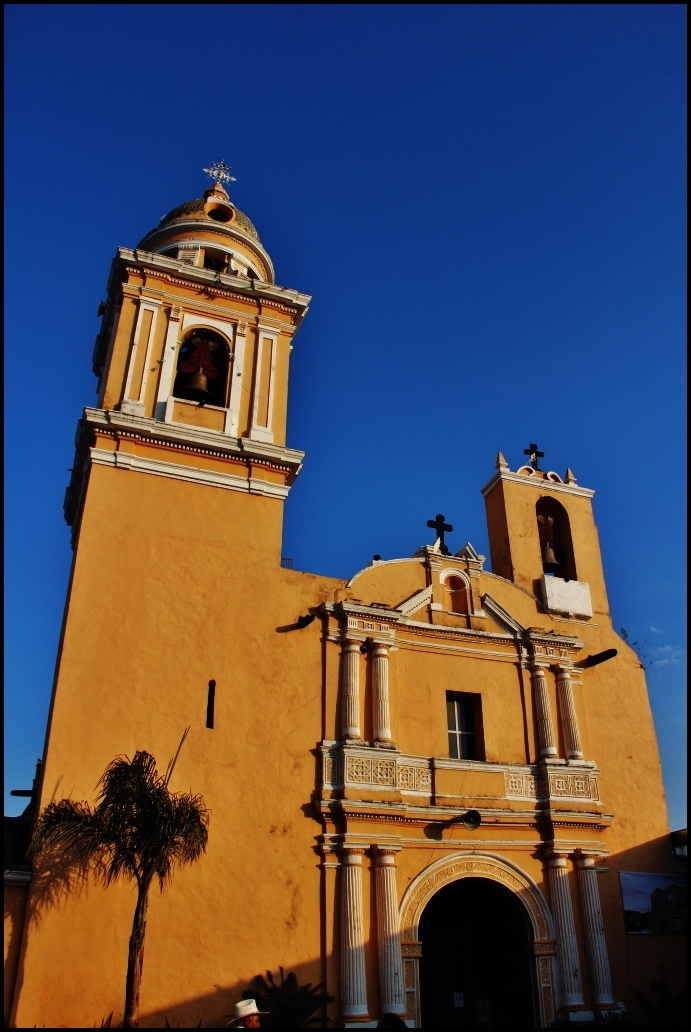
- St. Bonaventure Church in Nealtican, Puebla
- Interactive map of Nealtican
- Country: Mexico
- State: Puebla
- Time zone: UTC-6 (Zona Centro)

Nealtican is a municipality in the Mexican state of Puebla. The municipal seat is the town of San Buenaventura Nealtican.
