= Altepexi =

Municipality in Puebla, Mexico

Coordinates: 18°21′N 97°19′W

Altepexi Municipality
- Municipality
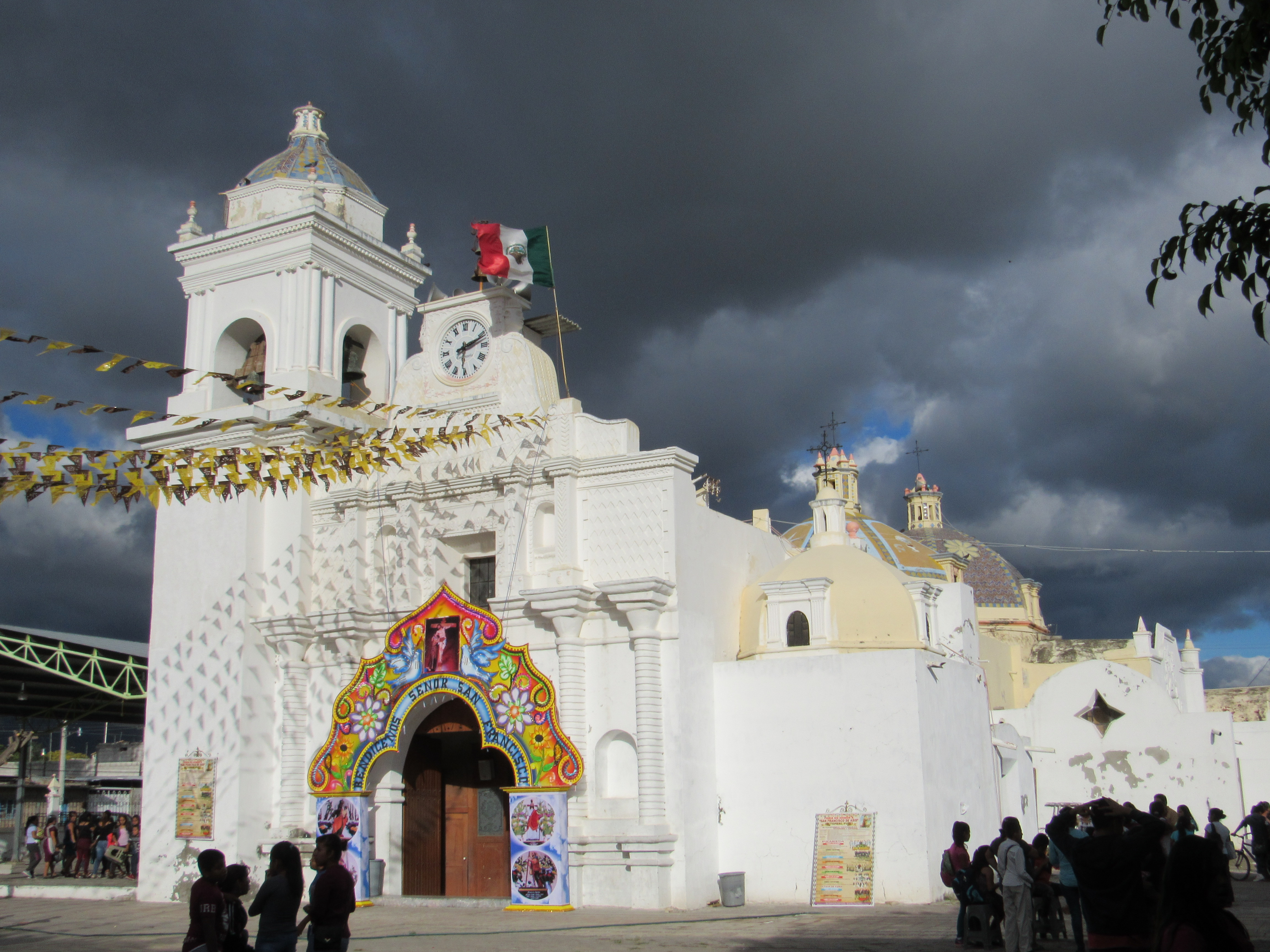

- Coat of arms
- Interactive map of Altepexi Municipality
- Country: Mexico
- State: Puebla

Population (2020)
  - Total: 22,629
- Time zone: UTC-6 (Zona Centro)

Altepexi is a municipality in the Mexican state of Puebla.
