= Atempan =

Coordinates: 19.8380°N 97.4564°W

- Municipality and town
- Coat of arms
- Interactive map of Atempan
- Country: Mexico
- State: Puebla
- Time zone: UTC-6 (Zona Centro)

Atempan is a town and municipality in the Mexican state of Puebla.
