= Atoyatempan =

Coordinates: 18°49′N 97°55′W

- Municipality and town
- Coat of arms
- Interactive map of Atoyatempan
- Country: Mexico
- State: Puebla
- Time zone: UTC-6 (Zona Centro)

Atoyatempan is a town and municipality in the Mexican state of Puebla.
