= Tilapa =

Coordinates: 18.5907°N 98.5542°W

- Municipality and town
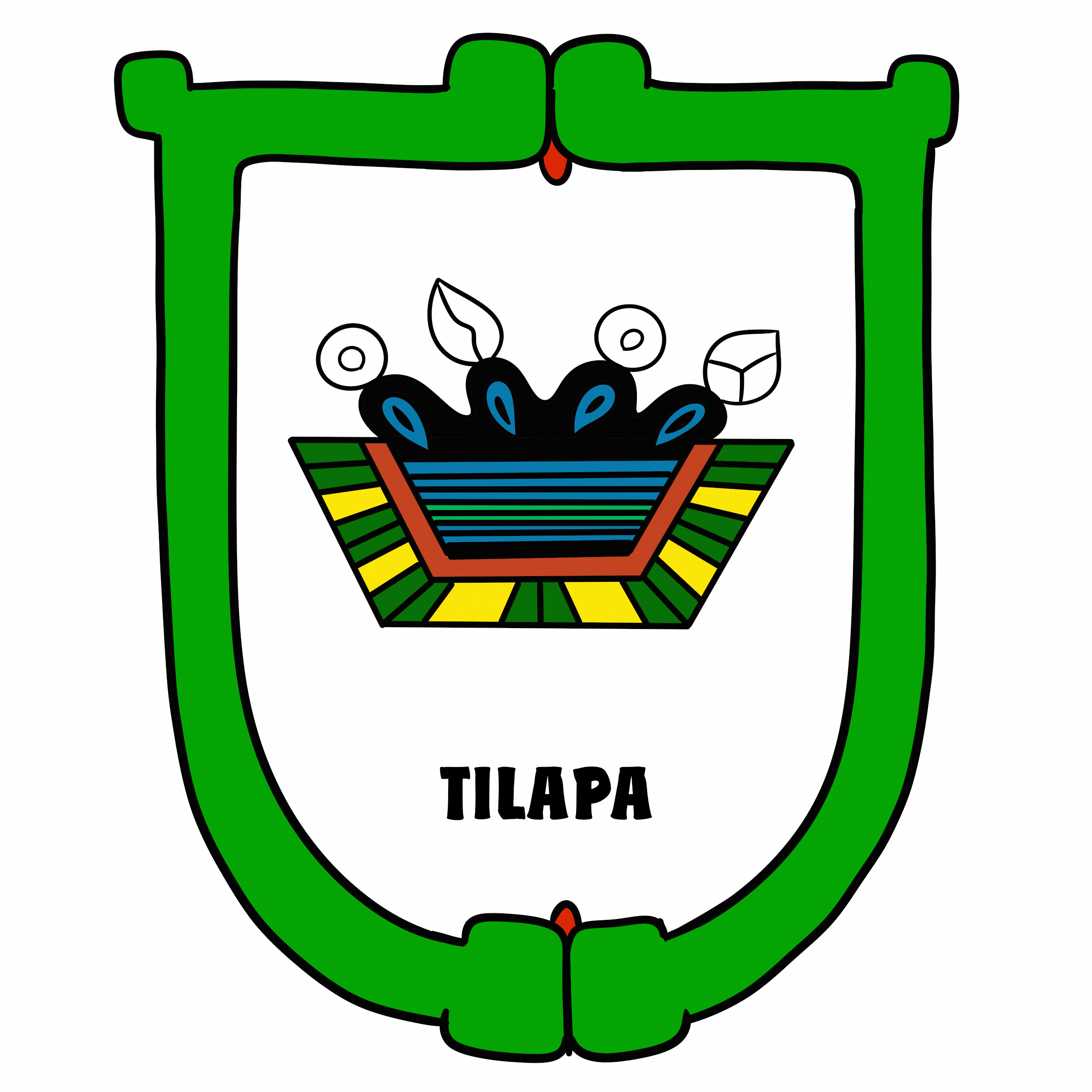
- Coat of arms
- Interactive map of Tilapa
- Country: Mexico
- State: Puebla
- Time zone: UTC-6 (Zona Centro)

Tilapa is a town and municipality in the Mexican state of Puebla.
