= Los Reyes de Juárez =

- Municipality
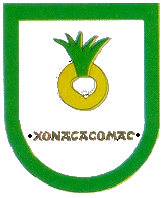
- Coat of arms
- Interactive map of Los Reyes de Juárez
- Coordinates: 18°56′45″N 97°48′21″W
- Country: Mexico
- State: Puebla

Population (2020)
  - Total: 30,021
- Time zone: UTC-6 (Zona Centro)

Los Reyes de Juárez is a municipality in the Mexican state of Puebla.
