= Yehualtepec =

Coordinates: 18°47′N 97°39′W

- Municipality and town
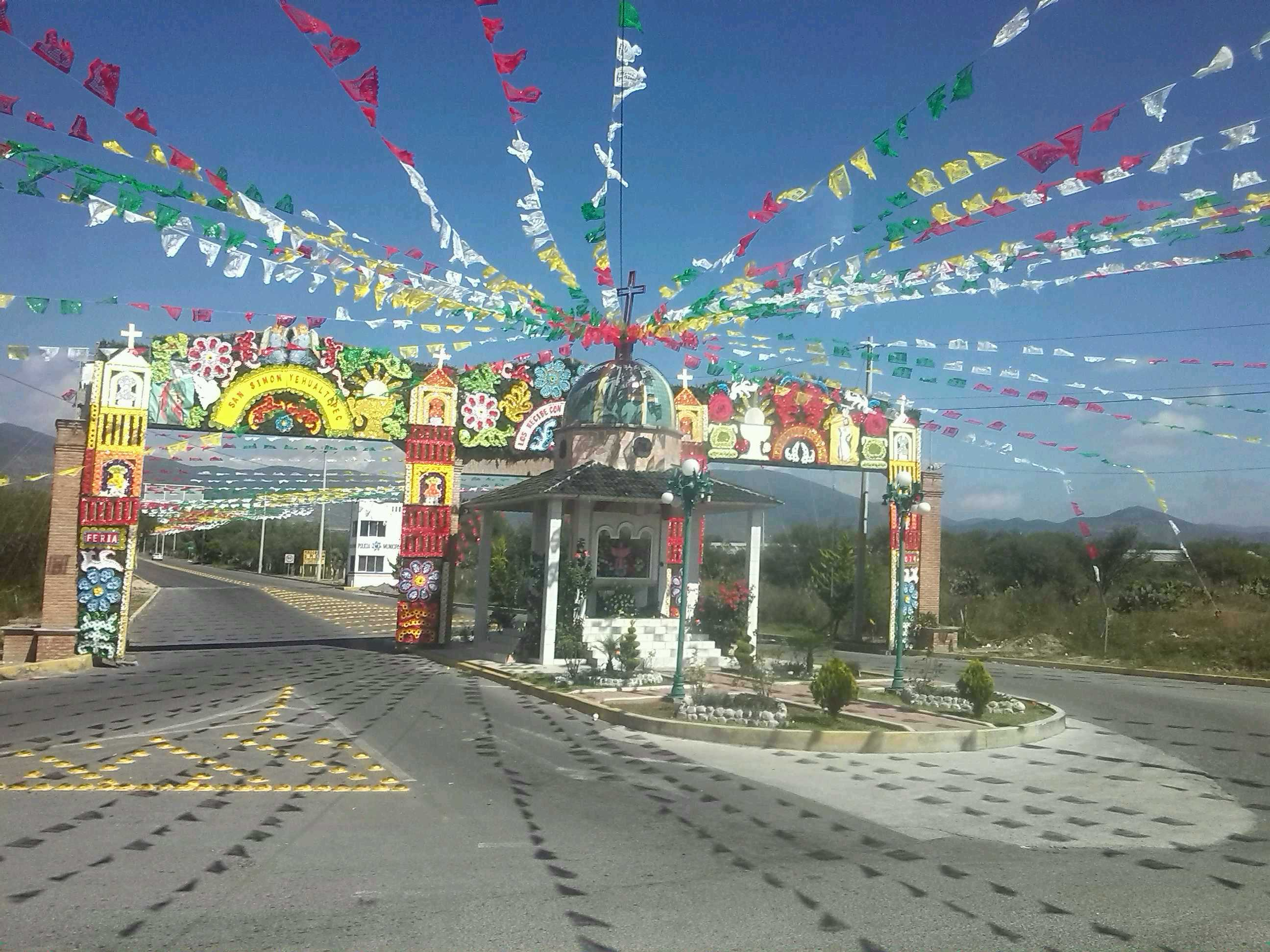
- Interactive map of Yehualtepec
- Country: Mexico
- State: Puebla
- Time zone: UTC-6 (Zona Centro)

Yehualtepec is a town and municipality in the Mexican state of Puebla.
