= Chilchotla =

Coordinates: 19.2500°N 97.1833°W

- Municipality and town
- Coat of arms

- Location of the municipality in Puebla
- Country: Mexico
- State: Puebla
- Time zone: UTC-6 (Zona Centro)

Chilchotla is a town and municipality in the Mexican state of Puebla.
