= Cuapiaxtla de Madero =

Coordinates: 18°55′N 97°49′W

- Municipality and town
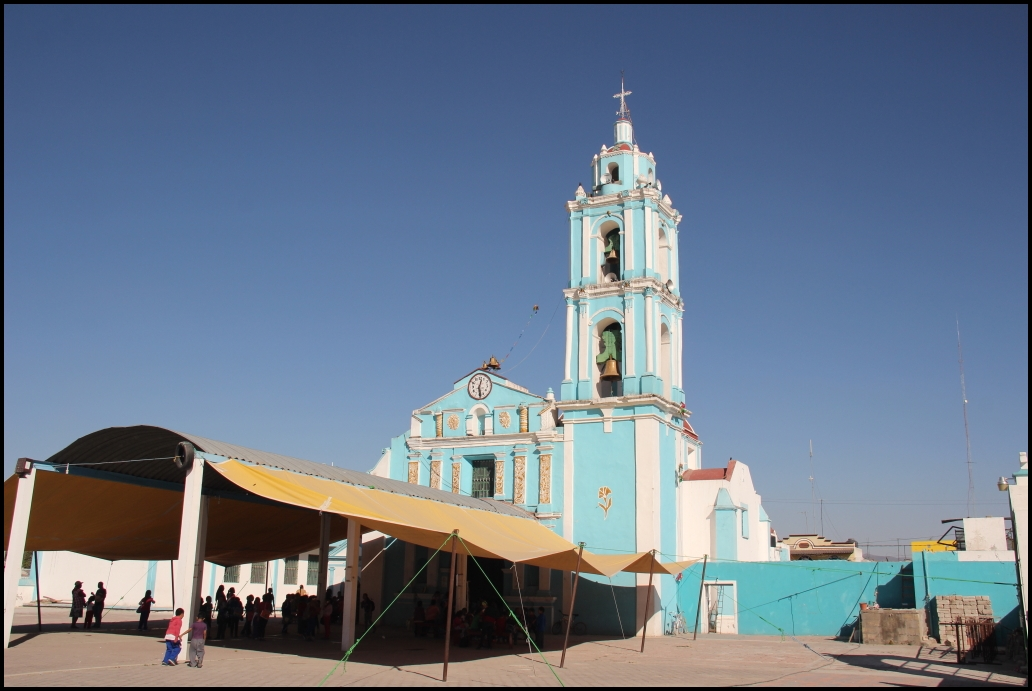

- Coat of arms
- Interactive map of Cuapiaxtla de Madero
- Country: Mexico
- State: Puebla
- Time zone: UTC-6 (Zona Centro)

Cuapiaxtla de Madero is a town and municipality in the Mexican state of Puebla.
