= San Matías Tlalancaleca =

Coordinates: 19°19′N 98°30′W

- Municipality and town
- Interactive map of San Matías Tlalancaleca
- Country: Mexico
- State: Puebla

Population (2005)
  - Total: 20,974
- Time zone: UTC-6 (Zona Centro)

San Matías Tlalancaleca is a town and municipality in the Mexican state of Puebla. The population of San Matias Tlalancaleca was 20,974 inhabitants in 2015.
