= Zinacatepec =

Coordinates: 18.3339°N 97.2456°W

- Municipality and town
- Interactive map of Zinacatepec
- Country: Mexico
- State: Puebla
- Time zone: UTC-6 (Zona Centro)

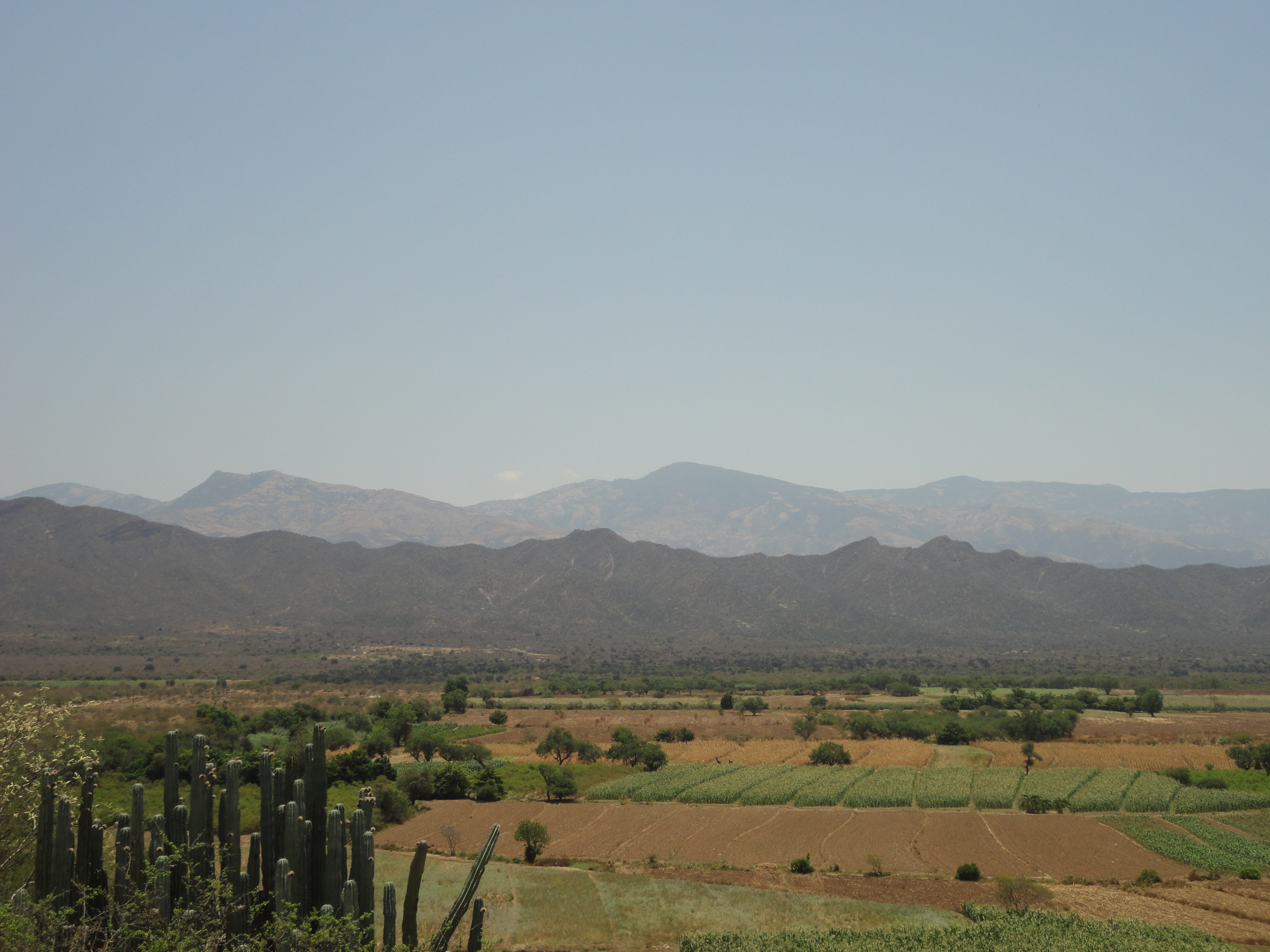
Farmland south of Zinacatepec seen from the Church of El Cerrito

Zinacatepec is a town and municipality in the Mexican state of Puebla.
