= Nopalucan =

- Municipality
- Coat of arms

- Location of the municipality in Puebla
- Coordinates: 19°12′59″N 97°49′19″W
- Country: Mexico
- State: Puebla
- Time zone: UTC-6 (Zona Centro)

Nopalucan is a town and its surrounding municipality in the Mexican state of Puebla.
