= San Antonio Cañada =

Coordinates: 18°30′N 97°17′W

- Municipality and town
- Interactive map of San Antonio Cañada
- Country: Mexico
- State: Puebla
- Time zone: UTC-6 (Zona Centro)

San Antonio Cañada is a town and municipality in the Mexican state of Puebla.
