= Nicolás Bravo (municipality) =

Coordinates: 18.6170°N 97.3061°W

- Municipality and town
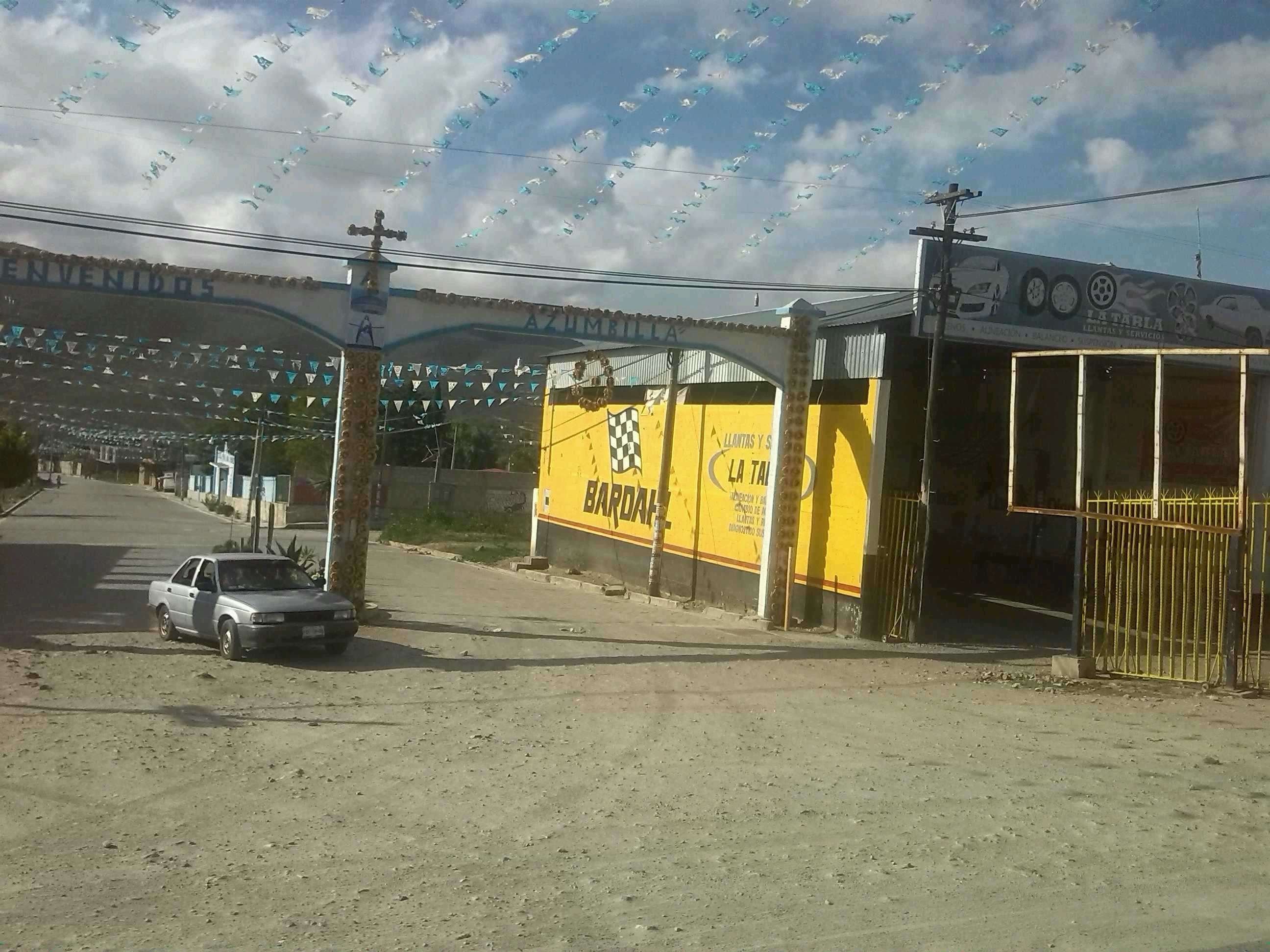

- Location of the municipality in Puebla
- Country: Mexico
- State: Puebla

Population (2020)
  - Total: 6,644
- Time zone: UTC-6 (Zona Centro)

Nicolás Bravo is a town and municipality in the Mexican state of Puebla.
