= Cuautempan =

Coordinates: 19.9132°N 97.7966°W

Cuautempan Municipio Libre de Cuautempan
- Municipality and town
- Coat of arms

- Location of the municipality in Puebla
- Country: Mexico
- State: Puebla
- Time zone: UTC-6 (Zona Centro)

Cuautempan is a town and municipality in the Mexican state of Puebla.
