= San Gabriel Chilac (municipality) =

Coordinates: 18.3261°N 97.3509°W

- Municipality
- Interactive map of San Gabriel Chilac
- Country: Mexico
- State: Puebla
- Time zone: UTC-6 (Zona Centro)

San Gabriel Chilac is a municipality in the Mexican state of Puebla.
