= San Sebastián Tlacotepec =

- Municipality and town
- Location in Mexico
- Coordinates: 19°28′24″N 99°12′21″W
- Country: Mexico
- State: Puebla
- Time zone: UTC-6 (Zona Centro)

San Sebastián Tlacotepec is a town and municipality in the Mexican state of Puebla.
