= Tzicatlacoyan =

Coordinates: 18°50′N 98°02′W

- Municipality and town
- Interactive map of Tzicatlacoyan
- Country: Mexico
- State: Puebla
- Time zone: UTC-6 (Zona Centro)

Tzicatlacoyan is a town and municipality in the Mexican state of Puebla.
