= Tepeyahualco de Cuauhtémoc =

Coordinates: 18.8162°N 97.8777°W

- Municipality and town
- Interactive map of Tepeyahualco de Cuauhtémoc
- Country: Mexico
- State: Puebla
- Time zone: UTC-6 (Zona Centro)

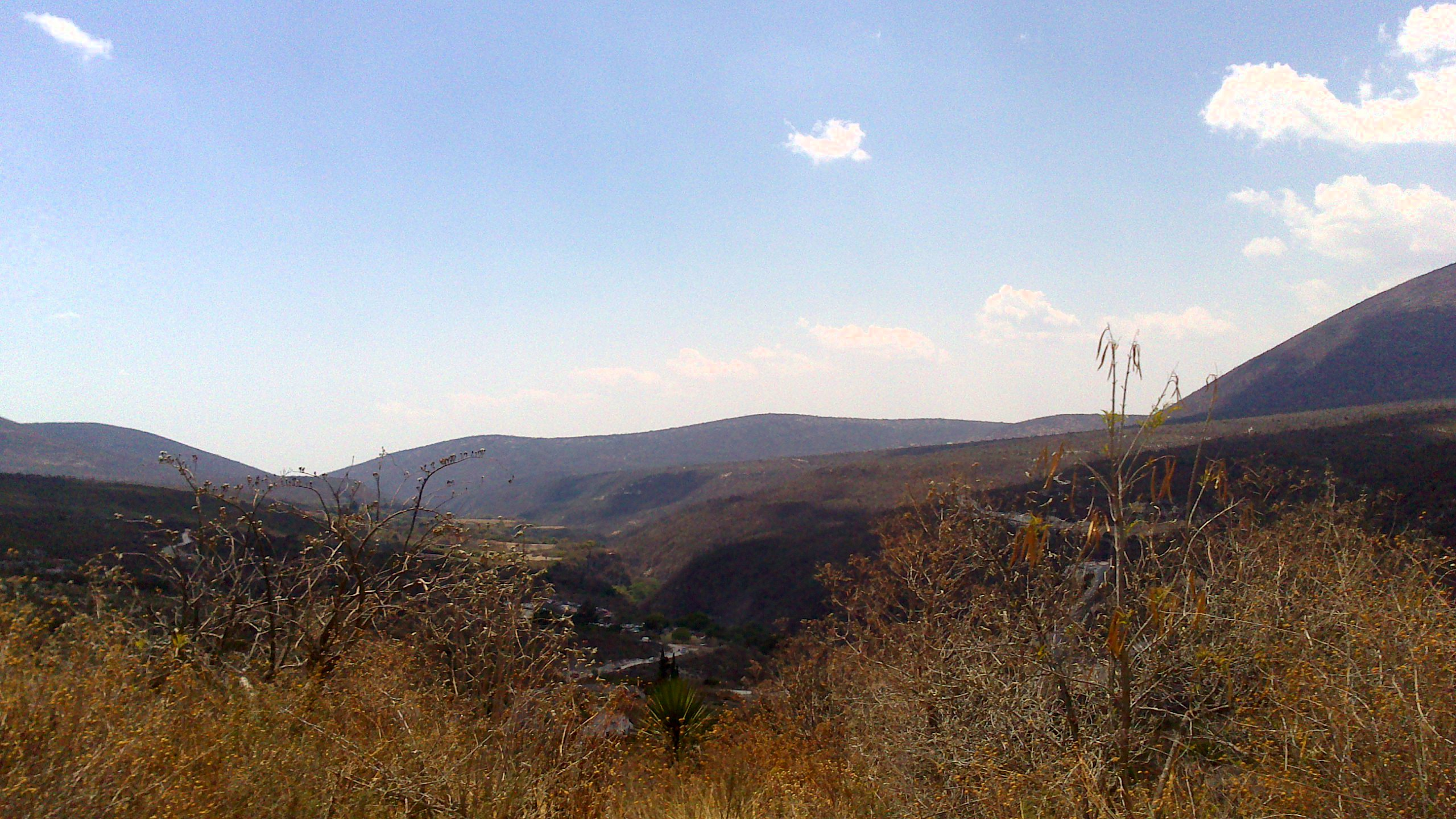
Panoramic view of Tepeyahulco

Tepeyahualco de Cuauhtémoc is a town and municipality in the Mexican state of Puebla.
