= San Miguel Xoxtla =

Coordinates: 19°11′N 98°18′W

- Municipality and town
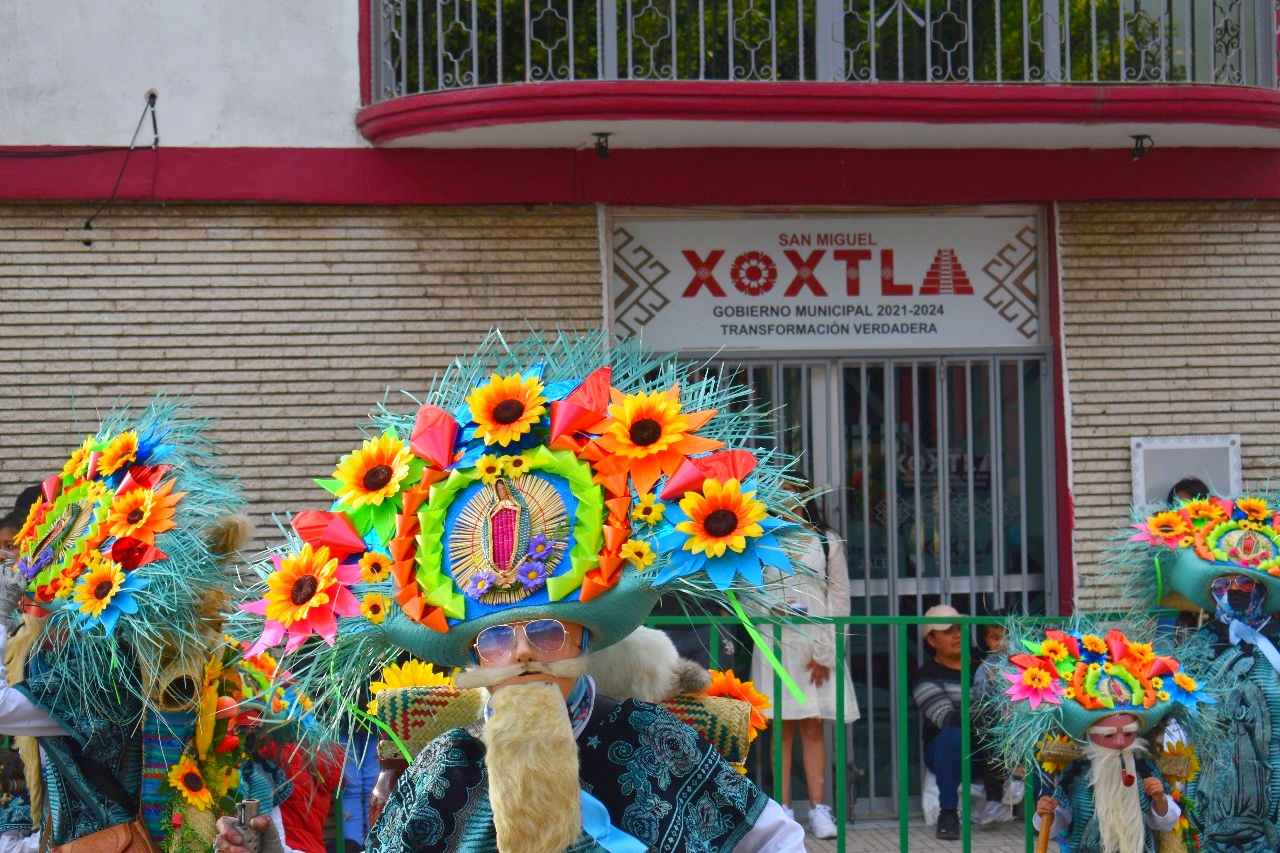

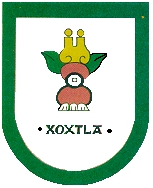
- Coat of arms
- Interactive map of San Miguel Xoxtla
- Country: Mexico
- State: Puebla
- Time zone: UTC-6 (Zona Centro)

San Miguel Xoxtla is a town and municipality in the Mexican state of Puebla.
