= Vicente Guerrero, Puebla =

Municipality in Puebla State, Mexico

Vicente Guerrero
- Municipality
- Location in Mexico Vicente Guerrero (Mexico)
- Country: Mexico
- State: Puebla
- Demonym: (in Spanish)
- Time zone: UTC−6 (CST)

Vicente Guerrero is a municipality in the Mexican state of Puebla. The municipal seat is Santa María del Monte.

== Geography ==
The municipality had 20,391 inhabitants in 2005 (according to INEGI). From this total, 9,646 were men and 10,745 women. Its total area is 234.73 km^{2}.

The geographical coordinates of the municipality are 18° 32′ N and 97° 12′ W. Its altitude is 2600 meters above the sea level.

Source: Statistics from INEGI.
