= Ixcaquixtla =

Coordinates: 18°27′N 97°49′W

- Municipality
- Interactive map of Ixcaquixtla
- Country: Mexico
- State: Puebla
- Time zone: UTC-6 (Zona Centro)

Ixcaquixtla is a municipality in the Mexican state of Puebla.
