= Tlachichuca =

Coordinates: 19°06′N 97°25′W

- Municipality and town
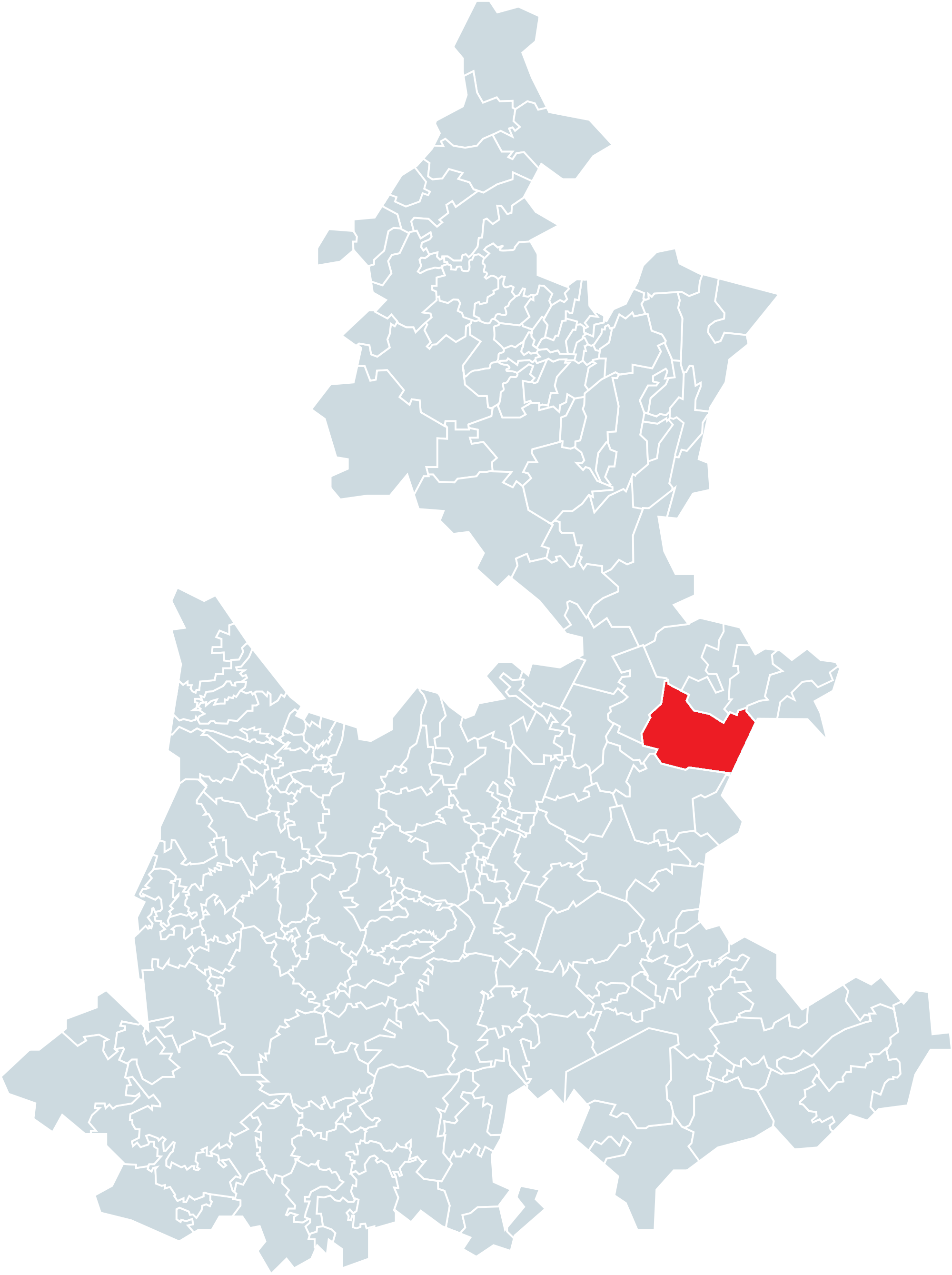
- Location of the municipality in Puebla
- Country: Mexico
- State: Puebla

Area
  - Total: 459.25 km^{2} (177.32 sq mi)

Population (2005)
  - Total: 7,181
  - Density: 15.64/km^{2} (40.50/sq mi)
- Time zone: UTC-6 (Zona Centro)

Tlachichuca is a town and municipality in the Mexican state of Puebla. It is the starting point for many climbers wishing to ascend Pico de Orizaba. The municipality covers an area of 459.25 km^{2}. The municipality has a total population of 7,181.
