= Hueyapan (municipality) =

Coordinates: 19.8847°N 97.4433°W

- Municipality and town
- Interactive map of Hueyapan
- Country: Mexico
- State: Puebla
- Time zone: UTC-6 (Zona Centro)

Hueyapan is a town and municipality in the Mexican state of Puebla.
