= Zapotitlán, Puebla =

Zapotitlán
- City and municipality
- Location within Puebla (state) Location within Mexico
- Coordinates: 18°20′N 97°28′W
- Country: Mexico
- State: Puebla
- Time zone: UTC-6 (Zona Centro)

Zapotitlán is a city and its surrounding municipality in the south-east of the Mexican state of Puebla.

In the prehispanic period, Zapotitlán was the center of an autonomous polity that extended across the mountains to the south and controlled a local source of salt. It may have held hegemony over other nearby settlements. The majority language was Popoloca, but Nahuatl might have been spoken by a minority. Zapotitlán surrendered to Hernán Cortés in 1520.
