= Cohuecán =

Coordinates: 18°46′N 98°43′W

- Municipality and town
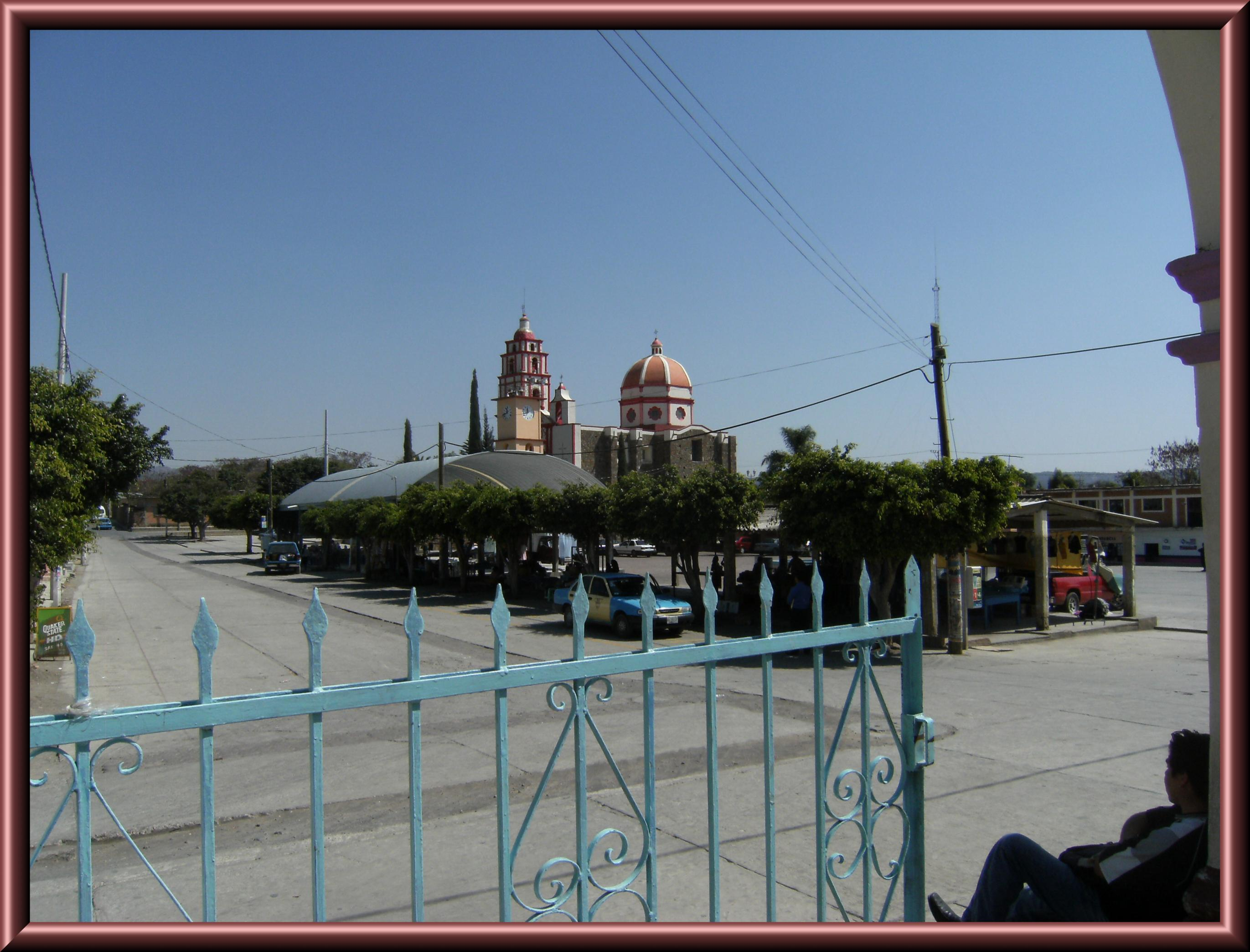

- Coat of arms

- Location of the municipality in Puebla
- Country: Mexico
- State: Puebla
- Time zone: UTC-6 (Zona Centro)

Cohuecán is a town and municipality in the Mexican state of Puebla.
