= Quimixtlán =

Coordinates: 19°16′N 97°07′W

- Municipality
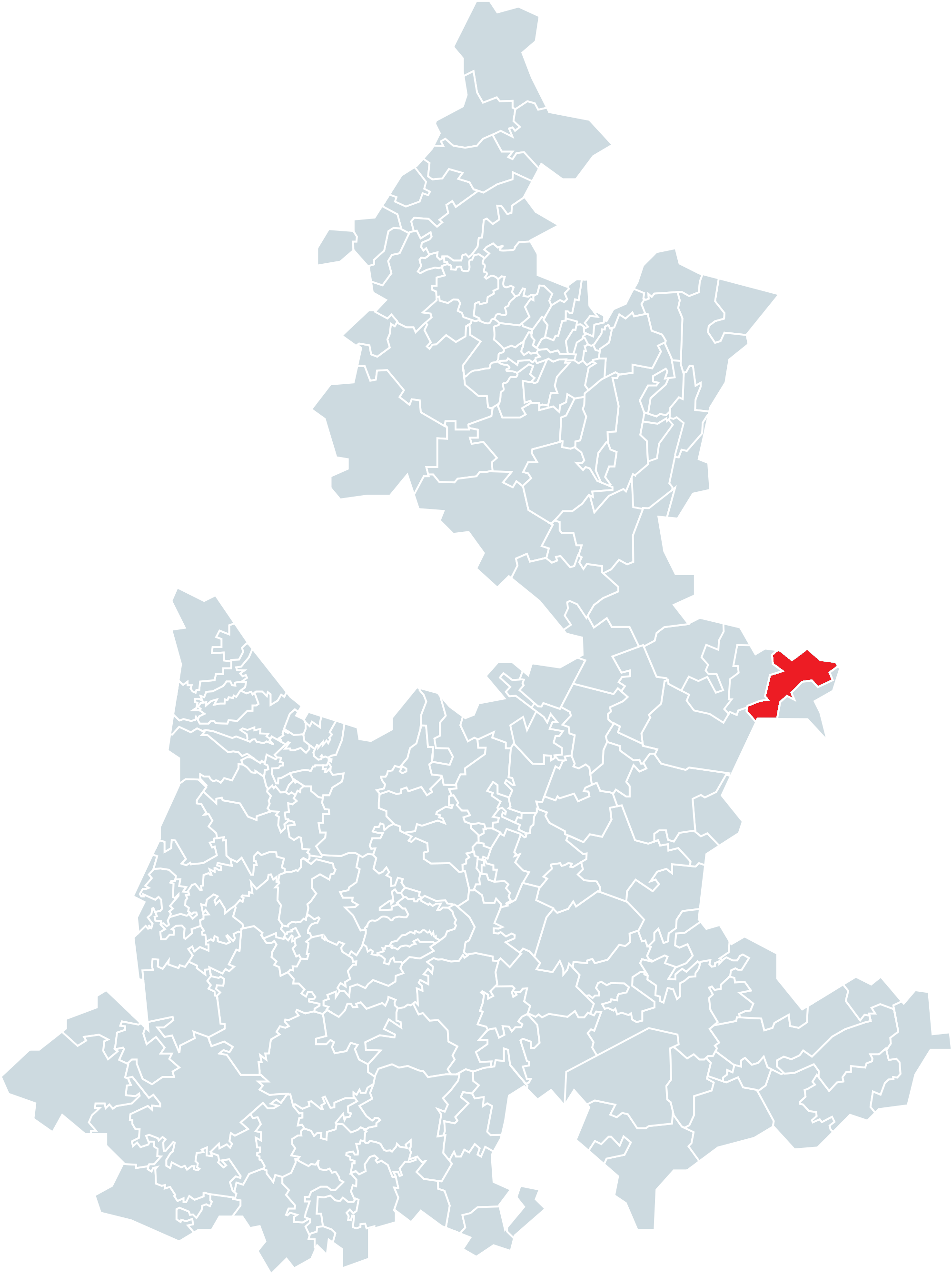
- Location of the municipality in Puebla
- Country: Mexico
- State: Puebla
- Elevation: 1,999 m (6,558 ft)

Population (2015)
  - Total: 22,136
- Time zone: UTC-6 (Zona Centro)

Quimixtlán is a municipality in the Mexican state of Puebla.

== Geography ==
=== Climate ===
Climate data for Quimixtlán (1951–2010)
Month	Jan	Feb	Mar	Apr	May	Jun	Jul	Aug	Sep	Oct	Nov	Dec	Year
Record high °C (°F)	36.5 (97.7)	36.0 (96.8)	39.0 (102.2)	41.5 (106.7)	41.0 (105.8)	38.0 (100.4)	33.5 (92.3)	33.5 (92.3)	34.0 (93.2)	37.0 (98.6)	35.0 (95.0)	35.0 (95.0)	41.5 (106.7)
Mean daily maximum °C (°F)	23.2 (73.8)	24.2 (75.6)	26.3 (79.3)	27.7 (81.9)	28.3 (82.9)	27.2 (81.0)	26.0 (78.8)	25.8 (78.4)	25.3 (77.5)	25.1 (77.2)	24.8 (76.6)	23.8 (74.8)	25.6 (78.1)
Daily mean °C (°F)	15.7 (60.3)	16.5 (61.7)	18.3 (64.9)	20.0 (68.0)	20.8 (69.4)	20.1 (68.2)	19.1 (66.4)	19.1 (66.4)	18.9 (66.0)	18.2 (64.8)	17.4 (63.3)	16.5 (61.7)	18.4 (65.1)
Mean daily minimum °C (°F)	8.3 (46.9)	8.9 (48.0)	10.2 (50.4)	12.2 (54.0)	13.4 (56.1)	13.0 (55.4)	12.3 (54.1)	12.3 (54.1)	12.5 (54.5)	11.3 (52.3)	10.0 (50.0)	9.1 (48.4)	11.1 (52.0)
Record low °C (°F)	0.0 (32.0)	1.0 (33.8)	0.0 (32.0)	3.5 (38.3)	7.0 (44.6)	8.5 (47.3)	8.5 (47.3)	5.5 (41.9)	8.0 (46.4)	5.0 (41.0)	4.0 (39.2)	1.5 (34.7)	0.0 (32.0)
Average precipitation mm (inches)	31.4 (1.24)	35.4 (1.39)	34.7 (1.37)	58.7 (2.31)	86.9 (3.42)	291.7 (11.48)	321.7 (12.67)	286.0 (11.26)	282.7 (11.13)	103.8 (4.09)	44.0 (1.73)	35.5 (1.40)	1,612.5 (63.48)
Average precipitation days (≥ 0.1 mm)	9.9	9.7	9.7	12.1	13.5	21.6	24.8	24.6	23.3	17.1	10.3	9.4	186.0
Source: Servicio Meteorologico Nacional
