= San Nicolás Buenos Aires =

Coordinates: 19°10′N 97°33′W

- Municipality and town
- Interactive map of San Nicolás Buenos Aires
- Country: Mexico
- State: Puebla
- Time zone: UTC-6 (Zona Centro)

San Nicolás Buenos Aires is a town and municipality in the Mexican state of Puebla.

Its highest elevation is the rhyolitic twin dome volcano Las Derrumbadas (3480 m).
