= San Felipe Tepatlán =

- Municipality and town
- Location in Mexico
- Coordinates: 20°06′N 97°49′W
- Country: Mexico
- State: Puebla
- Time zone: UTC-6 (Zona Centro)

San Felipe Tepatlán is a town and municipality in the Mexican state of Puebla.
