= Soltepec =

Coordinates: 19.1211°N 97.7086°W

- Municipality and town
- Interactive map of Soltepec
- Country: Mexico
- State: Puebla
- Time zone: UTC-6 (Zona Centro)

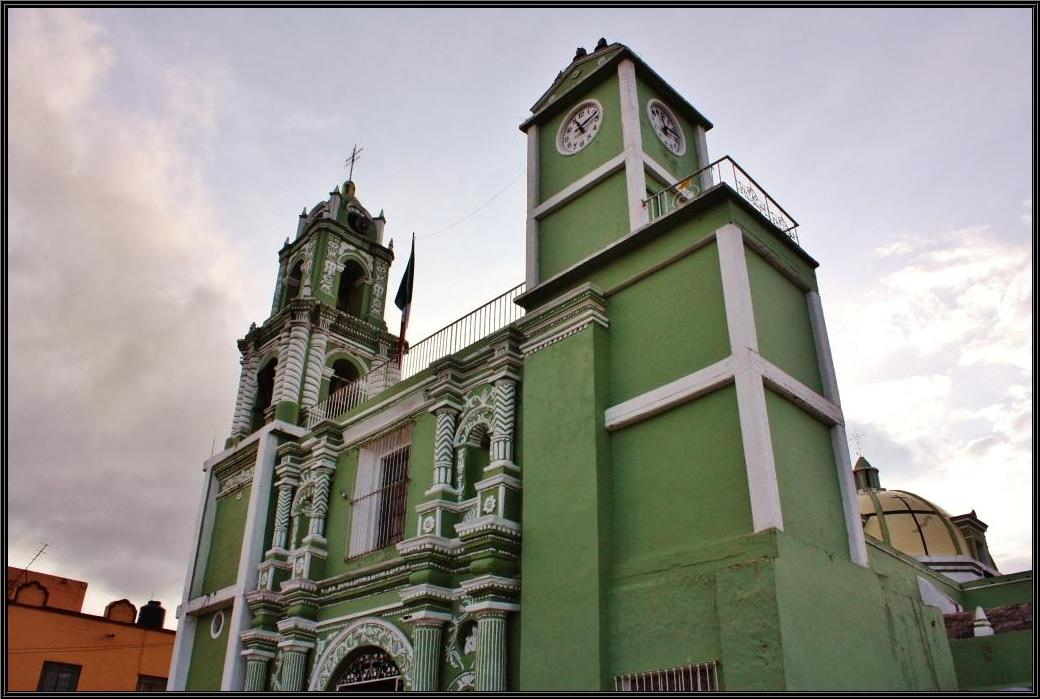
Parish of San Hipólito in Soltepec, Puebla, Mexico.

Soltepec is a town and municipality in the Mexican state of Puebla.
