= Tepexco =

Coordinates: 18°38′N 98°41′W

- Municipality and town
- Interactive map of Tepexco
- Country: Mexico
- State: Puebla
- Time zone: UTC-6 (Zona Centro)

Tepexco is a town and municipality in the Mexican state of Puebla.

Mayor Antolín Vital Martínez was murdered on October 24, 2017.
