= San Juan Atzompa =

Coordinates: 18°45′27″N 98°01′25″W

- Municipality and town
- Interactive map of San Juan Atzompa
- Country: Mexico
- State: Puebla
- Time zone: UTC-6 (Zona Centro)

San Juan Atzompa is a town and municipality in the Mexican state of Puebla.
