= San José Miahuatlán =

Coordinates: 18°17′N 97°17′W

- Municipality and town
- Interactive map of San José Miahuatlán
- Country: Mexico
- State: Puebla
- Time zone: UTC-6 (Zona Centro)

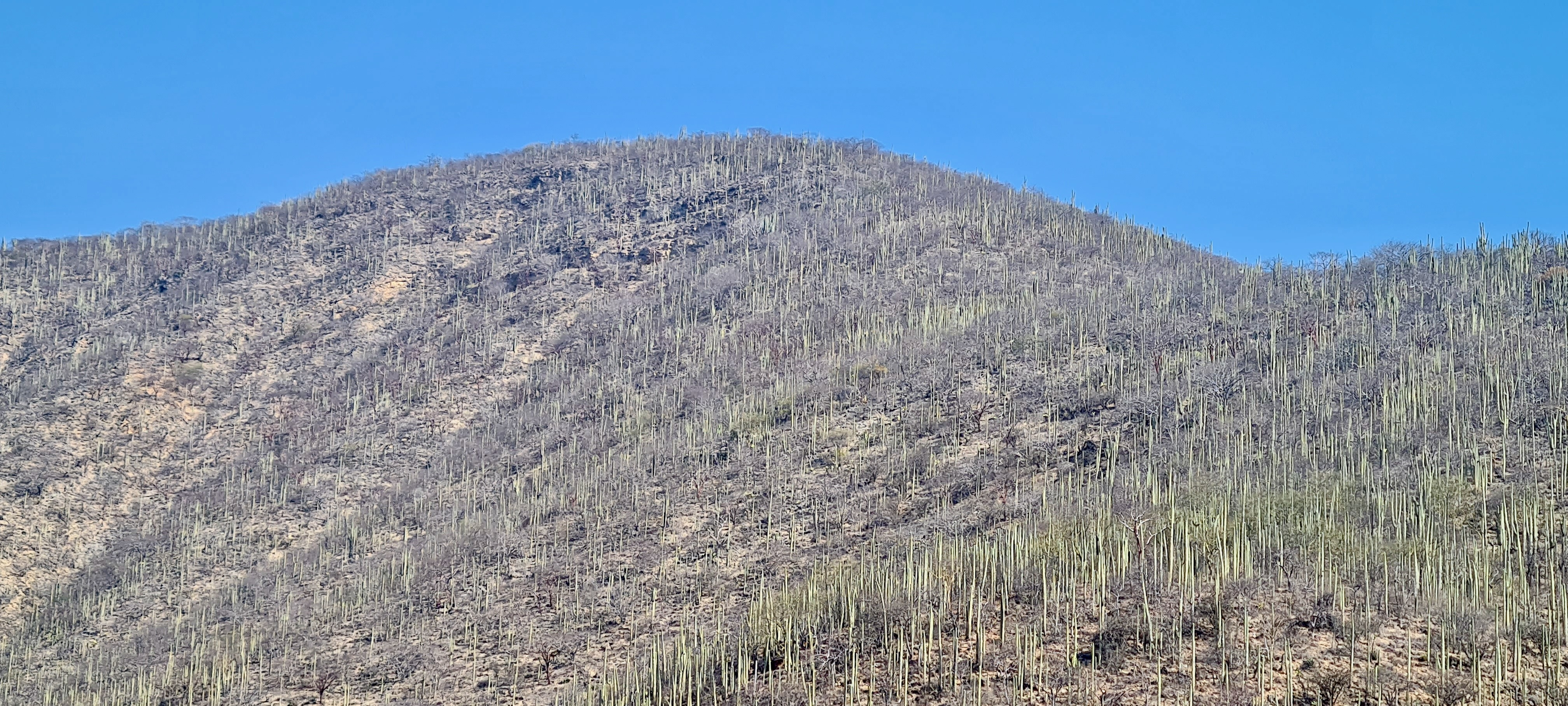
Landscape of San José Miahuatlán

San José Miahuatlán is a town and municipality in the Mexican state of Puebla.
