= Teteles de Ávila Castillo =

Coordinates: 19°51′N 97°27′W

- Municipality and town
- Interactive map of Teteles de Ávila Castillo
- Country: Mexico
- State: Puebla
- Time zone: UTC-6 (Zona Centro)

Teteles de Ávila Castillo is a town and municipality in the Mexican state of Puebla.
