= Caltepec =

Municipality in Puebla, Mexico

Coordinates: 18°10′N 97°29′W

- Municipality and town
- Coat of arms
- Interactive map of Caltepec
- Country: Mexico
- State: Puebla
- Time zone: UTC-6 (Zona Centro)

Caltepec is a town and municipality in the Mexican state of Puebla.
