= Santo Tomás Hueyotlipan (municipality) =

Coordinates: 18°54′N 97°51′W

- Municipality
- Interactive map of Santo Tomás Hueyotlipan
- Country: Mexico
- State: Puebla
- Time zone: UTC-6 (Zona Centro)

Santo Tomás Hueyotlipan is a municipality in the Mexican state of Puebla.
