= 14th federal electoral district of Puebla =

Federal electoral district of Mexico

Puebla's 14th
- Electoral district of the Chamber of Deputies of Mexico

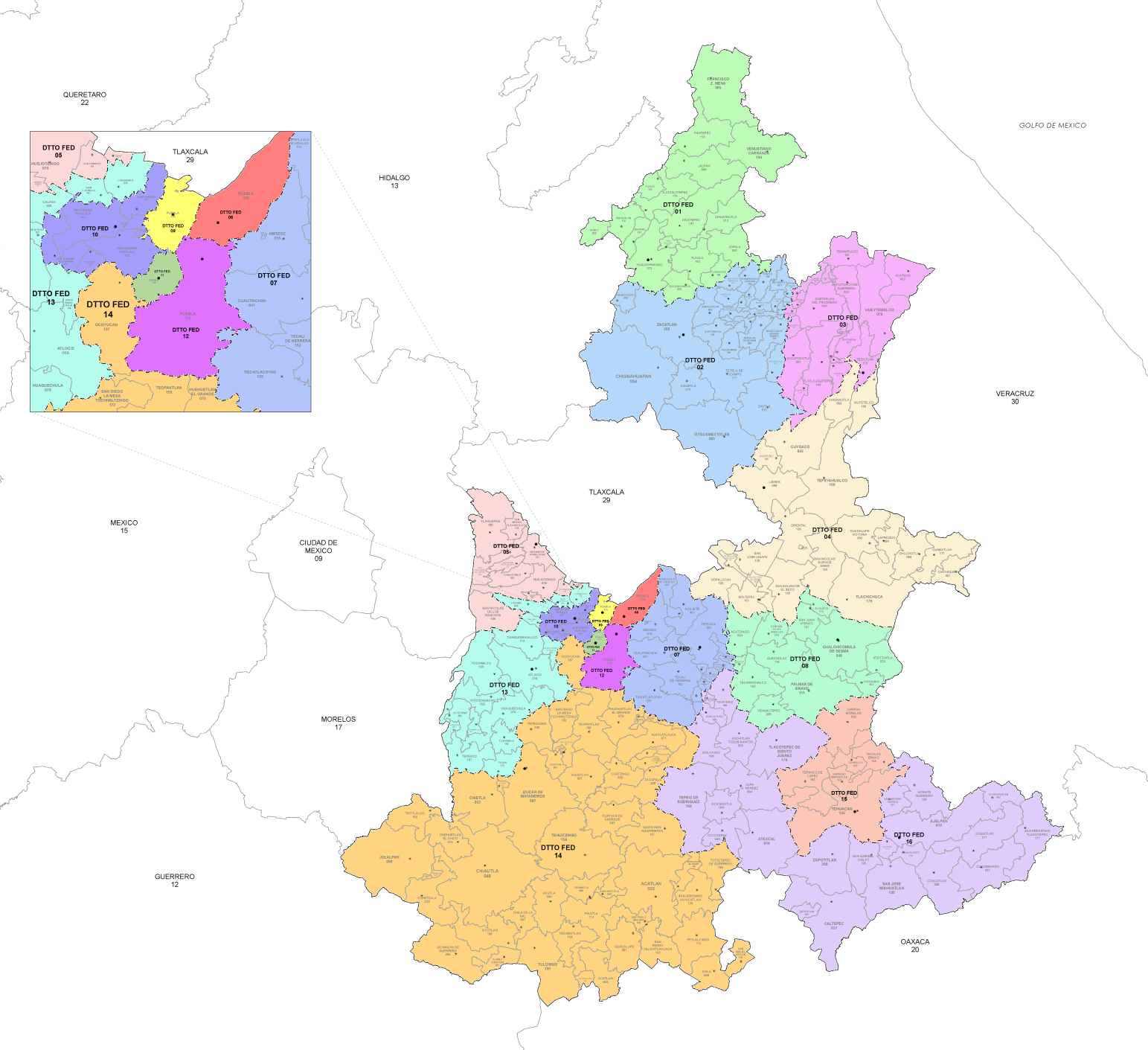
- 14th district since 2023

Incumbent
- Member: Eduardo Castillo López
- Party: ▌Morena
- Congress: 66th (2024–2027)

District
- State: Puebla
- Head town: Izúcar de Matamoros
- Coordinates: 18°36′N 98°28′W
- Covers: 47 municipalities: Acatlán, Ahuatlán, Ahuehuetitla, Albino Zertuche, Atzala, Axutla, Coatzingo, Cohetzala, Cuayuca de Andrade, Chiautla, Chietla, Chigmecatitlán, Chila, Chila de la Sal, Chinantla, Epatlán, Guadalupe, Huatlatlauca, Huehuetlán el Chico, Huehuetlán el Grande, Ixcamilpa de Guerrero, Izúcar de Matamoros, Jolalpan, La Magdalena Tlatlauquitepec, Ocoyucan, Petlalcingo, Piaxtla, San Diego la Meza Tochimiltzingo, San Jerónimo Xayacatlán, San Juan Atzompa, San Martín Totoltepec, San Miguel Ixitlán, San Pablo Anicano, San Pedro Yeloixtlahuaca, Santa Catarina Tlaltempan, Santa Inés Ahuatempan, Tecomatlán, Tehuitzingo, Teopantlán, Teotlalco, Tepeojuma, Totoltepec de Guerrero, Tulcingo, Xayacatlán de Bravo, Xicotlán, Xochiltepec, Zacapala
- PR region: Fourth
- Precincts: 242
- Population: 402,337 (2020 census)

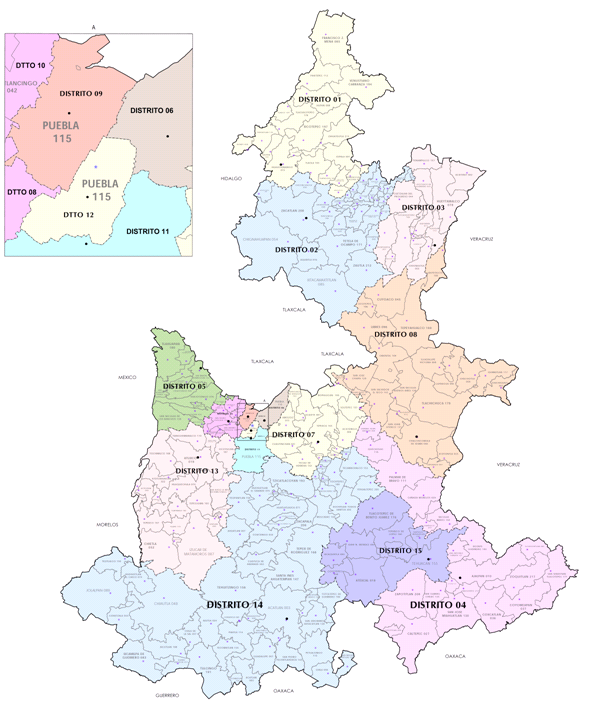
Puebla's districts in 2017–2022

The 14th federal electoral district of Puebla (Spanish: Distrito electoral federal 14 de Puebla) is one of the 300 electoral districts into which Mexico is divided for elections to the federal Chamber of Deputies and one of 16 such districts in the state of Puebla.

It elects one deputy to the lower house of Congress for each three-year legislative session by means of the first-past-the-post system. Votes cast in the district also count towards the calculation of proportional representation ("plurinominal") deputies elected from the fourth region.

Suspended in 1930, (Note: An amendment to Article 52 of the Constitution in 1928 changed the original provision of "one deputy per 60,000 inhabitants" to "one deputy per 100,000"; as a result, the size of the Chamber of Deputies fell from 281 in the 1928 election to 171 in 1934.) Puebla's 14th was re-established as part of the 1977 political reforms. The restored district returned its first deputy in the 1979 mid-term election.

The current member for the district, elected in the 2024 general election, is Eduardo Castillo López of the National Regeneration Movement (Morena).

== District territory ==
Under the 2023 districting plan adopted by the National Electoral Institute (INE), which is to be used for the 2024, 2027 and 2030 federal elections, Puebla's congressional seat allocation rose from 15 to 16. The 14th district is in the south-west of Puebla and covers 242 electoral precincts (secciones electorales) across 47 of the state's municipalities:

- Acatlán, Ahuatlán, Ahuehuetitla, Albino Zertuche, Atzala, Axutla, Coatzingo, Cohetzala, Cuayuca de Andrade, Chiautla, Chietla, Chigmecatitlán, Chila, Chila de la Sal, Chinantla, Epatlán, Guadalupe, Huatlatlauca, Huehuetlán el Chico, Huehuetlán el Grande, Ixcamilpa de Guerrero, Izúcar de Matamoros, Jolalpan, La Magdalena Tlatlauquitepec, Ocoyucan, Petlalcingo, Piaxtla, San Diego la Meza Tochimiltzingo, San Jerónimo Xayacatlán, San Juan Atzompa, San Martín Totoltepec, San Miguel Ixitlán, San Pablo Anicano, San Pedro Yeloixtlahuaca, Santa Catarina Tlaltempan, Santa Inés Ahuatempan, Tecomatlán, Tehuitzingo, Teopantlán, Teotlalco, Tepeojuma, Totoltepec de Guerrero, Tulcingo, Xayacatlán de Bravo, Xicotlán, Xochiltepec and Zacapala.

The head town (cabecera distrital), where results from individual polling stations are gathered together and tallied, is the city of Izúcar de Matamoros. The district reported a population of 402,337 in the 2020 census.

== Previous districting schemes ==
Evolution of electoral district numbers
	1974	1978	1996	2005	2017	2023
Puebla	10	14	15	16	15	16
Chamber of Deputies	196	300				

2017–2022

From 2017 to 2022, when Puebla was assigned 15 congressional seats, the district's head town was at Acatlán de Osorio in the south of the state and it covered 51 municipalities.

2005–2017

Under the 2005 plan, the district was one of 16 in Puebla. Its head town was at Izúcar de Matamoros and it covered 31 municipalities.

1996–2005

Between 1996 and 2005, Puebla had 15 districts. The 14th covered 27 municipalities, with its head town at Izúcar de Matamoros.

1978–1996

The districting scheme in force from 1978 to 1996 was the result of the 1977 electoral reforms, which increased the number of single-member seats in the Chamber of Deputies from 196 to 300. Under that plan, Puebla's seat allocation rose from 10 to 14. The 14th district's head town was at Tepeaca in the central part of the state and it comprised 27 municipalities.

== Deputies returned to Congress ==
(Mexico) National parties
- Current
- PAN
- PRI
- PT
- PVEM
- MC
- Morena
- PAZ
- Somos
- Defunct or local only
- PLM
- PNR
- PRM
- PNM
- PP
- PPS
- PARM
- PFCRN
- CON
- PANAL
- PSD
- PES
- PES
- PRD

Puebla's 14th district
Election	Deputy	Party	Term	Legislature
1916	Gabino Bandera y Mata		1916–1917	Constituent Congress of Querétaro
1917	Luis Cabrera Lobato		1917–1918	27th Congress
...
The 14th district was suspended between 1930 and 1979
1979	Melquíades Morales Flores	Institutional Revolutionary Party	1979–1982	51st Congress
1982	Sacramento Joffre Vázquez	Institutional Revolutionary Party	1982–1985	52nd Congress
1985	Antonio Tenorio Adame	Institutional Revolutionary Party	1985–1988	53rd Congress
1988	María de los Ángeles Blanco Casco	Institutional Revolutionary Party	1988–1991	54th Congress
1991	Jesús Saravia Ordóñez	Institutional Revolutionary Party	1991–1994	55th Congress
1994	María Cecilia Hernández Ríos	Institutional Revolutionary Party	1994–1997	56th Congress
1997	Víctor Manuel López Balbuena	Institutional Revolutionary Party	1997–2000	57th Congress
2000	Benito Vital Ramírez	Institutional Revolutionary Party	2000–2003	58th Congress
2003	Juan Manuel Vega Rayet	Institutional Revolutionary Party	2003–2006	59th Congress
2006	Charbel Jorge Estefan Chidiac	Institutional Revolutionary Party	2006–2009	60th Congress
2009	Francisco Alberto Jiménez Merino	Institutional Revolutionary Party	2009–2012	61st Congress
2012	Javier Filiberto Guevara González	Institutional Revolutionary Party	2012–2015	62nd Congress
2015	Charbel Jorge Estefan Chidiac	Institutional Revolutionary Party	2015–2018	63rd Congress
2018	Nelly Maceda Carrera	Labour Party (Mexico)	2018–2021	64th Congress
2021	Nelly Maceda Carrera	Labour Party (Mexico)	2021–2024	65th Congress
2024	Eduardo Castillo López	National Regeneration Movement	2024–2027	66th Congress

== Presidential elections ==
Puebla's 14th district
Election	District won by	Party or coalition	%
2018	Andrés Manuel López Obrador	Juntos Haremos Historia	59.2753
2024	Claudia Sheinbaum Pardo	Sigamos Haciendo Historia	72.2983
