= Regions of Puebla =

Puebla is one of the smallest states of Mexico. With nearly 34 thousand square kilometers (13,000 mi^{2}), it is 21st in area within all federal units (Spanish: entidades federativas). Despite that, it is the sixth most populous state, with approximately 6 million persons. Puebla is also the second state with higher number of municipalities, only behind the state of Oaxaca. The municipalities of Puebla are grouped into seven regions.

== Region I - Huauchinango ==
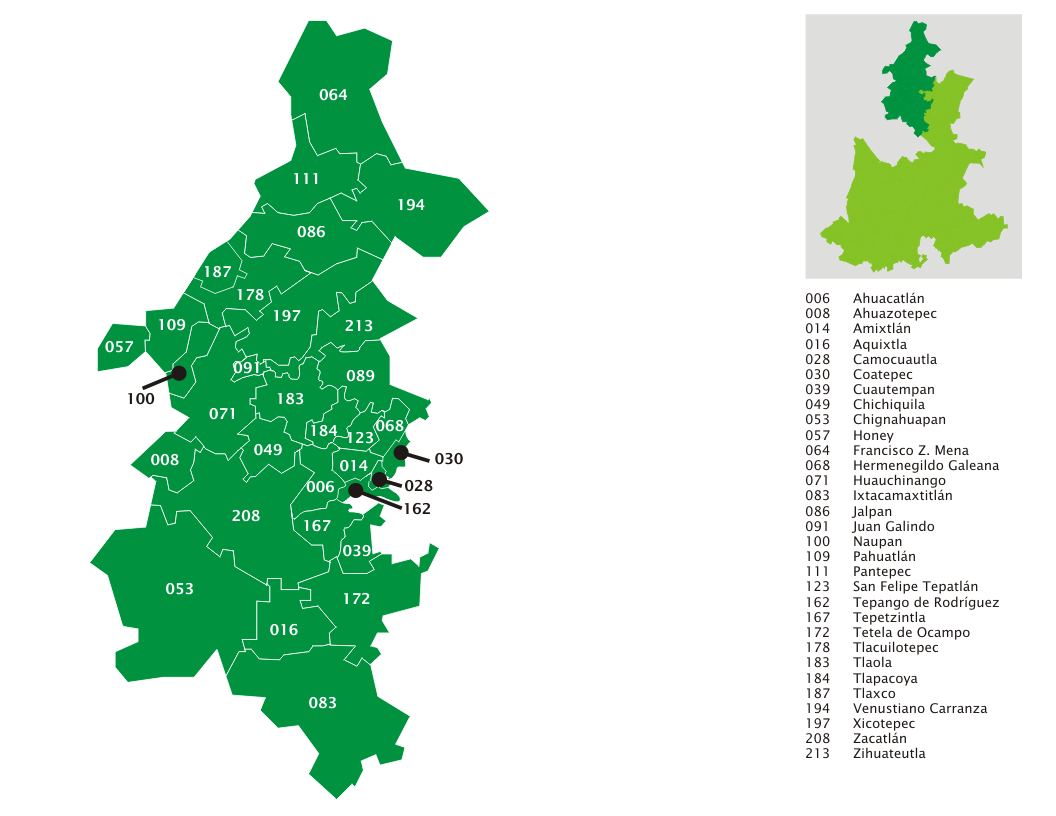
Municipalities of Región I - Huauchinango
INGEI Code	Municipality	Municipal Seat	Population
006	Ahuacatlán	Ahuacatlán	13.058
008	Ahuazotepec	Ahuazotepec	9.087
014	Amixtlán	Amixtlán	4.704
016	Aquixtla	Aquixtla	7.664
028	Camocuautla	Camocuautla	2.160
030	Coatepec	Coatepec	884
039	Cuautempan	San Esteban Cuautempan	8.984
049	Chiconcuautla	Chiconcuautla	12.855
053	Chignahuapan	Chignahuapan	49.266
057	Honey	Chila Honey	7.279
064	Francisco Z. Mena	Metlaltoyuca	16.331
068	Hermenegildo Galeana	Bienvenido	8.194
071	Huauchinango	Huauchinango	83.537
083	Ixtacamaxtitlán	Ixtacamaxtitlán	28.358
086	Jalpan	Jalpan	13.257
091	Juan Galindo	Nuevo Necaxa	9.301
100	Naupan	Naupan	9.613
109	Pahuatlán	Pahuatlán de Valle	18.326
111	Pantepec	Pantepec	19.401
123	San Felipe Tepatlán	San Felipe Tepatlán	4.425
162	Tepango de Rodríguez	Tepango de Rodríguez	4.003
167	Tepetzintla	Tepetzintla	9.457
172	Tetela de Ocampo	Tetela de Ocampo	25.859
178	Tlacuilotepec	Tlacuilotepec	17.764
183	Tlaola	Tlaola	18.233
184	Tlapacoya	Tlapacoya	6.502
187	Tlaxco	Tlaxco	6.271
194	Venustiano Carranza	Venustiano Carranza	25.115
197	Xicotepec de Juárez	Xicotepec de Juárez	70.164
208	Zacatlán	Zacatlán	69.698
213	Zihuateutla	Zihuateutla	13.535

== Region II - Teziutlán ==
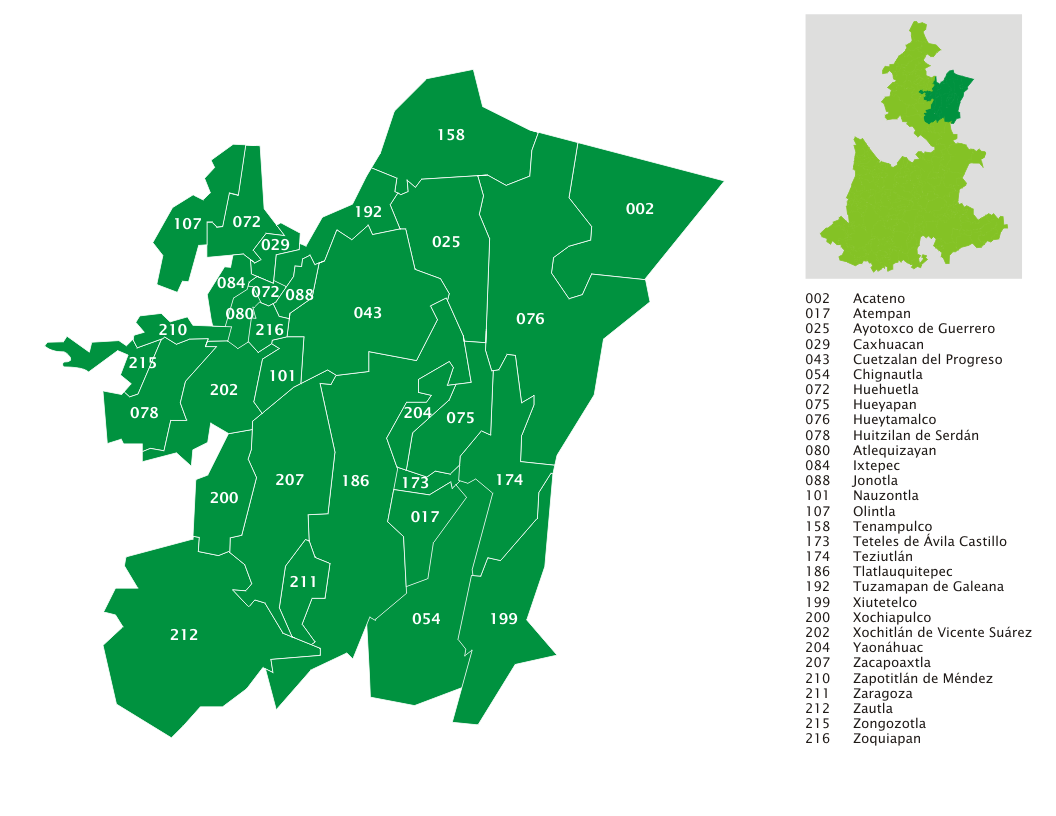
Municipalities of Región II - Teziutlán
INGEI Code	Municipality	Municipal Seat	Population
002	Acateno	San José Acateno	9.199
017	Atempan	Atempan	18.565
025	Ayotoxco de Guerrero	Ayotoxco de Guerrero	7.704
029	Caxhuacan	Caxhuacan	3.931
043	Cuetzalan del Progreso	Ciudad de Cuetzalan	45.010
054	Chignautla	Chignautla	21.571
072	Huehuetla	Huehuetla	16.130
075	Hueyapan	Hueyapan	10.206
076	Hueytamalco	Hueytamalco	28.345
078	Huitzilan de Serdán	Huitzilan	11.670
080	Atlequizayan	Atlequizayan	2.761
084	Ixtepec	Ixtepec	6.589
088	Jonotla	Jonotla	4.942
101	Nauzontla	Nauzontla	3.617
107	Olintla	Olintla	12.609
158	Tenampulco	Tenampulco	7.060
173	Teteles de Ávila Castillo	Teteles de Ávila Castillo	5.556
174	Teziutlán	Teziutlán	81.156
186	Tlatlauquitepec	Ciudad de Tlatlauquitepec	47.106
192	Tuzamapan de Galeana	Tuzamapan de Galeana	6.176
199	Xiutetelco	San Juan Xiutetelco	30.426
200	Xochiapulco	Cinco de Mayo	4.306
202	Xochitlán de Vicente Suárez	Xochitlán de Romero Rubio	11.760
204	Yaonáhuac	Yaonáhuac	6.649
207	Zacapoaxtla	Zacapoaxtla	49.242
210	Zapotitlán de Méndez	Zapotitlán de Méndez	5.267
211	Zaragoza	Zaragoza	13.810
212	Zautla	Santiago Zautla	19.447
215	Zongozotla	Zongozotla	4.392
216	Zoquiapan	Zoquiapan	2.949

== Region III - Ciudad Serdán ==
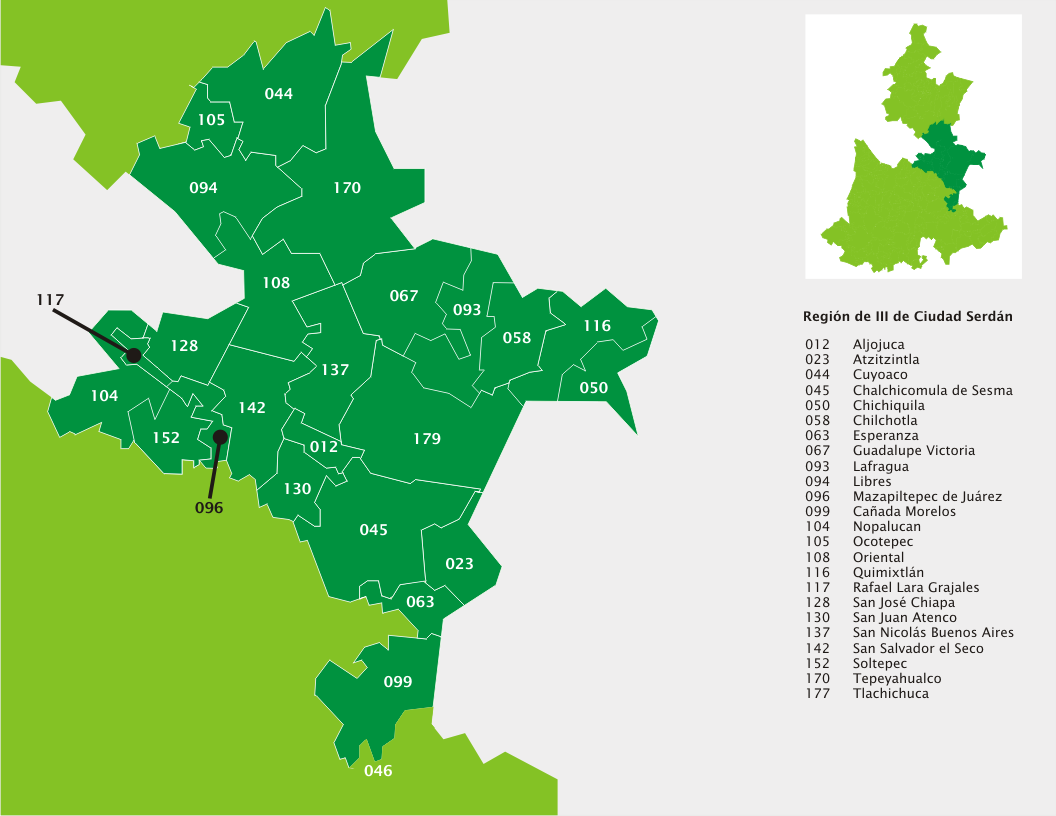
Municipalities of Región III - Ciudad Serdán
INGEI Code	Municipality	Municipal Seat	Population
012	Aljojuca	Aljojuca	6.632
023	Atzitzintla	Atzitzintla	8.104
044	Cuyoaco	Cuyoaco	14.434
045	Chalchicomula de Sesma	Ciudad Serdán	38.711
050	Chichiquila	Chichiquila	20.252
058	Chilchotla	Rafael J. García	17.833
063	Esperanza	Esperanza	13.473
067	Guadalupe Victoria	Guadalupe Victoria	14.833
093	Lafragua	Saltillo	9.207
094	Libres	Ciudad de Libres	25.719
096	Mazapiltepec de Juárez	Mazapiltepec de Juárez	2.396
099	Cañada Morelos	Morelos Cañada	17.779
104	Nopalucan	Nopalucan de la Granja	19.033
105	Ocotepec	Ocotepec	4.945
108	Oriental	Oriental	13.769
116	Quimixtlán	Quimixtlán	19.235
117	Rafael Lara Grajales	Rafael Lara Grajales	14.766
128	San José Chiapa	San José Chiapa	6.744
130	San Juan Atenco	San Juan Atenco	3.708
137	San Nicolás, Buenos Aires	San Nicolás de Buenos Aires	8.334
142	San Salvador el Seco	San Salvador el Seco	23.342
152	Soltepec	Soltepec	11.068
170	Tepeyahualco	Tepeyahualco	15.268
177	Tlachichuca	Tlachichuca	25.674

== Region IV - San Pedro Cholula ==
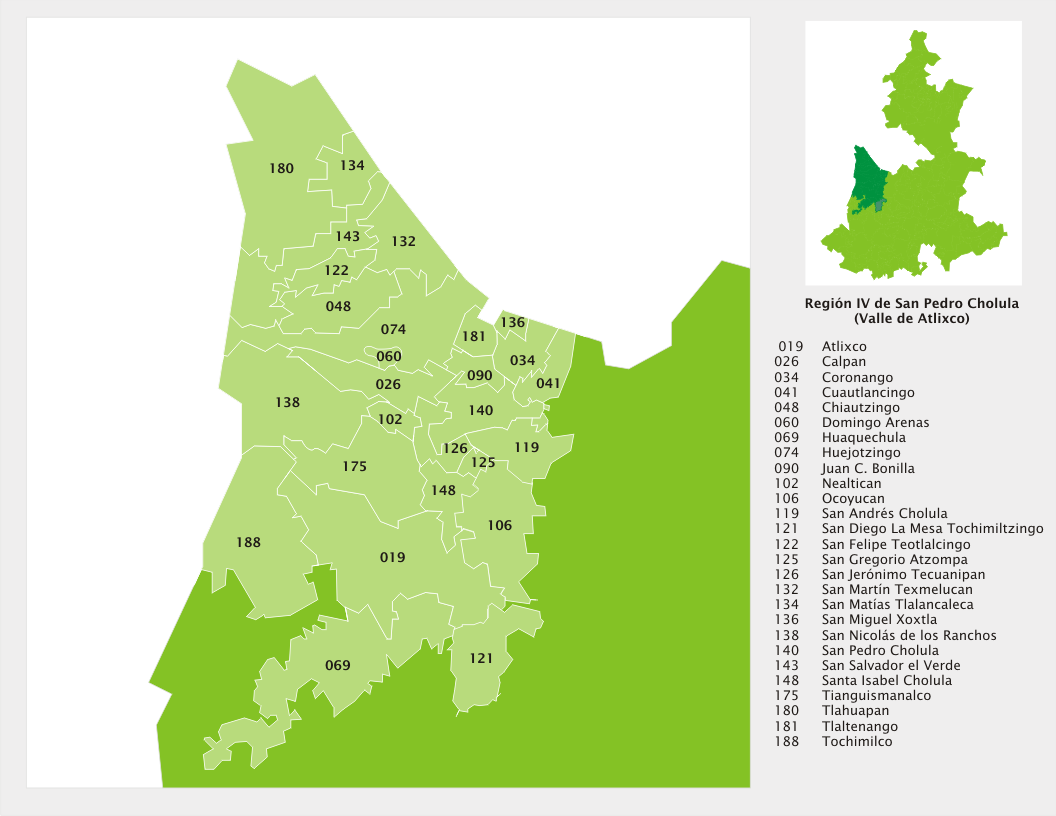
Municipalities of Región IV - San Pedro Cholula
INGEI Code	Municipality	Municipal Seat	Population
019	Atlixco	Atlixco de las Flores	117.111
026	Calpan	San Andrés Calpan	13.571
034	Coronango	Santa María Coronango	27.575
041	Cuautlancingo	San Juan Cuautlancingo	46.729
048	Chiautzingo	San Lorenzo Chiautzingo	17.788
060	Domingo Arenas	Domingo Arenas	5.581
069	Huaquechula	Huaquechula	28.654
074	Huejotzingo	Huejotzingo	50.868
090	Juan C. Bonilla	Cuanalá	14.483
102	Nealtican	San Buenaventura Nealtican	10.644
106	Ocoyucan	Santa Clara Ocoyucan	23.619
119	San Andrés Cholula	San Andrés Cholula	56.066
121	San Diego la Meza Tochimiltzingo	Tochimiltzingo	1.116
122	San Felipe Teotlalcingo	San Felipe Teotlalcingo	8.632
125	San Gregorio Atzompa	San Gregorio Atzompa	6.934
126	San Jerónimo Tecuanipan	San Jerónimo Tecuanipan	5.267
132	San Martín Texmelucan	San Martín Texmelucan de Labastida	121.071
134	San Matías Tlalancaleca	San Matías Tlalancaleca	16.361
136	San Miguel Xoxtla	San Miguel Xoxtla	9.350
138	San Nicolás de los Ranchos	San Nicolás de los Ranchos	10.009
140	San Pedro Cholula	Cholula de Rivadavia	99.794
143	San Salvador el Verde	San Salvador el Verde	22.649
148	Santa Isabel Cholula	Santa Isabel Cholula	8.815
175	Tianguismanalco	Tianguismanalco	9.640
180	Tlahuapan	Santa Rita Tlahuapan	31.665
181	Tlaltenango	Tlaltenango	5.370
188	Tochimilco	Tochimilco	17.171

== Region V - Puebla ==
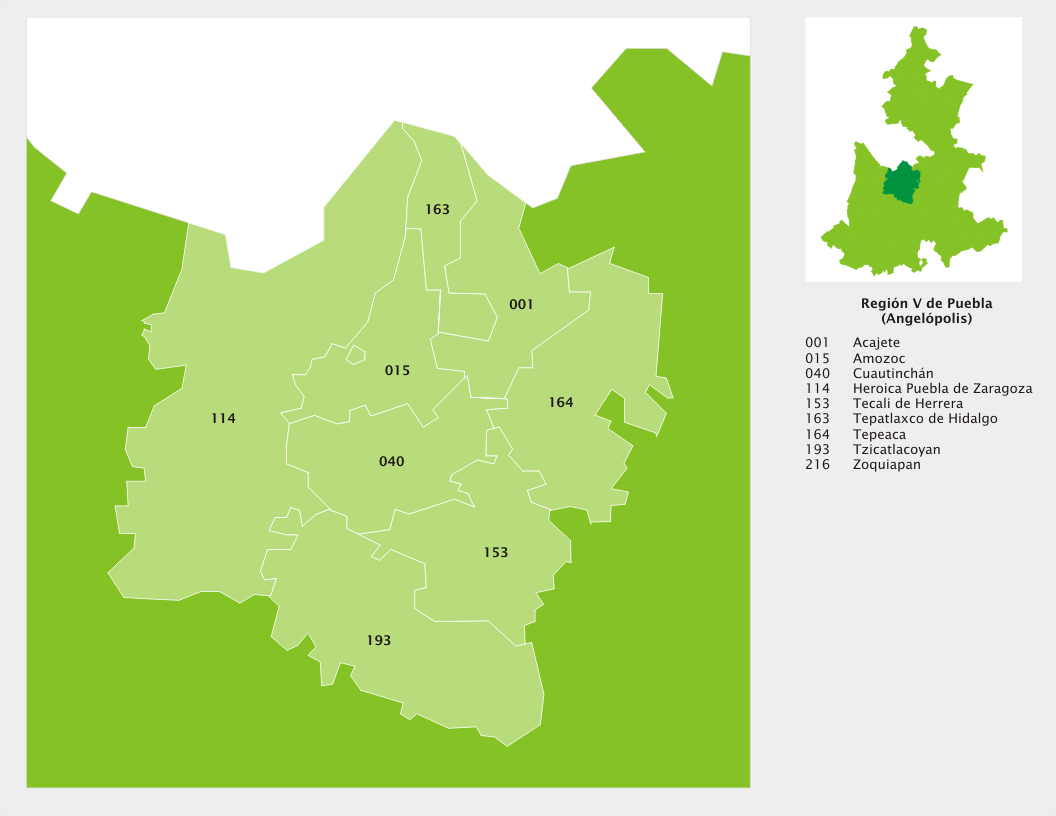
Municipalities of Región V - Puebla
INGEI Code	Municipality	Municipal Seat	Population
001	Acajete	Acajete	49.462
015	Amozoc	Amozoc de Mota	64.315
040	Cuautinchán	Cuautinchán	7.086
114	Heroica Puebla de Zaragoza	Heroica Puebla de Zaragoza	1.346.916
153	Tecali de Herrera	Tecali de Herrera	16.844
163	Tepatlaxco de Hidalgo	Tepatlaxco de Hidalgo	14.055
164	Tepeaca	Tepeaca	62.651
193	Tzicatlacoyan	Tzicatlacoyan	6.185

== Region VI - Izúcar de Matamoros ==
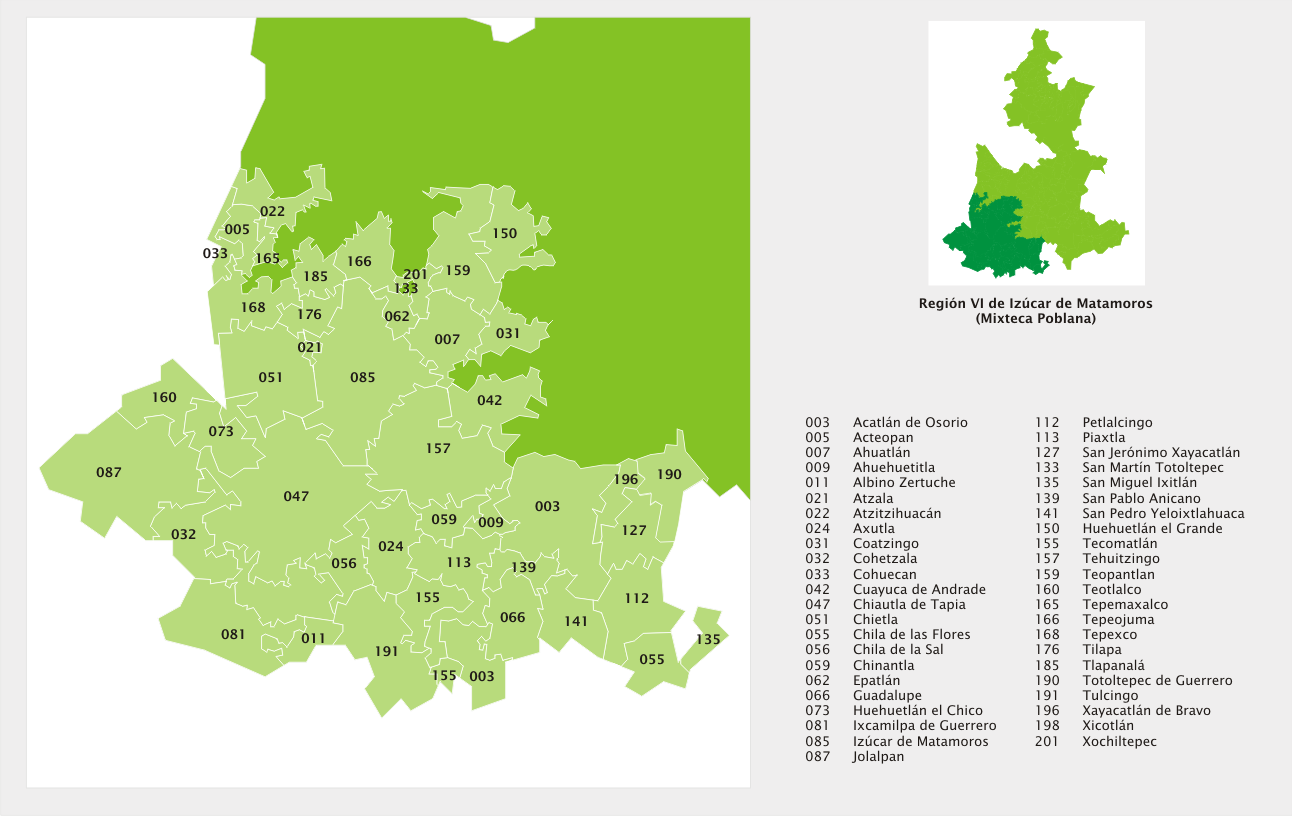
Municipalities of Región VI - Izúcar de Matamoros
INGEI Code	Municipality	Municipal Seat	Population
003	Acatlán de Osorio	Acatlán de Osorio	34.765
005	Acteopan	Acteopan	3.074
007	Ahuatlán	Ahuatlán	3.795
009	Ahuehuetitla	Ahuehuetitla	2.614
011	Albino Zertuche	Acaxtlahuacán de Albino Zertuche	2.004
021	Atzala	Atzala	1.310
022	Atzitzihuacán	Santiago Atzitzihuacán	11.933
024	Axutla	Axutla	1.302
031	Coatzingo	Coatzingo	3.564
032	Cohetzala	Santa María Cohetzala	1.880
033	Cohuecan	Cohuecan	4.596
042	Cuayuca de Andrade	San Pedro Cuayuca	3.985
047	Chiautla de Tapia	Chiautla de Tapia	21.133
051	Chietla	Chietla	36.606
055	Chila de las Flores	Chila de las Flores	5.043
056	Chila de la Sal	Chila de la Sal	1.961
059	Chinantla	Chinantla	2.810
062	Epatlán	San Juan Epatlán	4.845
066	Guadalupe	Guadalupe	7.748
073	Huehuetlán el Chico	Huehuetlán el Chico	9.651
081	Ixcamilpa de Guerrero	Ixcamilpa	4.614
085	Izúcar de Matamoros	Izúcar de Matamoros	70.739
087	Jolalpan	Jolalpan	12.556
112	Petlalcingo	Petlalcingo	9.680
113	Piaxtla	Piaxtla	5.948
127	San Jerónimo Xayacatlán	San Jerónimo Xayacatlán	4.317
133	San Martín Totoltepec	San Martín Totoltepec	951
135	San Miguel Ixitlán	San Miguel Ixitlán	727
139	San Pablo Anicano	San Pablo Anicano	3.441
141	San Pedro Yeloixtlahuaca	San Pedro Yeloixtlahuaca	3.711
150	Huehuetlán el Grande	Santo Domingo Huehuetlán	6.734
155	Tecomatlán	Tecomatlán	6.830
157	Tehuitzingo	Tehuitzingo	12.650
159	Teopantlán	Teopantlan	4.840
160	Teotlalco	Teotlalco	3.549
165	Tepemaxalco	San Felipe Tepemaxalco	1.272
166	Tepeojuma	Tepeojuma	8.671
168	Tepexco	Tepexco	6.392
176	Tilapa	Tilapa	8.331
185	Tlapanalá	Tlapanalá	8.686
190	Totoltepec de Guerrero	Totoltepec de Guerrero	1.161
191	Tulcingo	Tulcingo de Valle	11.025
196	Xayacatlán de Bravo	Xayacatlán de Bravo	1.701
198	Xicotlán	Xicotlán	1.433
201	Xochiltepec	Xochiltepec	3.279

== Region VII - Tehuacán ==
Municipalities of Región VII - Tehuacán
INGEI Code	Municipality	Municipal Seat	Population
004	Acatzingo	Acatzingo de Hidalgo	40.439
010	Ajalpan	Ajalpan	48.642
013	Altepexi	Altepexi	15.811
018	Atexcal	San Martín Atexcal	3.732
020	Atoyatempan	Atoyatempan	5.782
027	Caltepec	Caltepec	5.104
035	Coxcatlán	Coxcatlán	18.692
036	Coyomeapan	Santa María Coyomeapan	12.662
037	Coyotepec	San Vicente Coyotepec	2.524
038	Cuapiaxtla de Madero	Cuapiaxtla de Madero	6.583
046	Chapulco	Chapulco	5.542
052	Chigmecatitlán	Chigmecatitlán	1.301
061	Eloxochitlán	Eloxochitlán	10.806
065	General Felipe Ángeles	San Pablo de las Tunas	15.105
070	Huatlatlauca	Huatlatlauca	8.026
077	Hueytlalpan	Hueytlalpan	5.465
079	Huitziltepec	Santa Clara Huitziltepec	4.591
082	Ixcaquixtla	San Juan Ixcaquixtla	6.922
089	Jopala	Jopala	13.489
092	Juan N. Méndez	Atenayuca	5.239
095	La Magdalena Tlatlauquitepec	La Magdalena Tlatlauquitepec	722
097	Mixtla	San Francisco Mixtla	2.044
098	Molcaxac	Molcaxac	6.229
103	Nicolás Bravo	Nicolás Bravo	5.375
110	Palmar de Bravo	Palmar de Bravo	35.812
115	Quecholac	Quecholac	38.649
118	Los Reyes de Juárez	Los Reyes de Juárez	20.849
120	San Antonio Cañada	San Antonio Cañada	4.495
124	San Gabriel Chilac	San Gabriel Chilac	13.554
129	San José Miahuatlán	San José Miahuatlán	11.697
131	San Juan Atzompa	San Juan Atzompa	815
144	San Salvador Huixcolotla	San Salvador Huixcolotla	10.631
145	San Sebastián Tlacotepec	Tlacotepec de Porfirio Díaz	13.219
146	Santa Catarina Tlaltempan	Santa Catarina Tlaltempan	887
147	Santa Inés Ahuatempan	Santa Inés Ahuatempan	6.112
149	Santiago Miahuatlán	Santiago Miahuatlán	14.249
151	Santo Tomás Hueyotlipán	Santo Tomás Hueyotlipán	7.082
154	Tecamachalco	Tecamachalco	59.177
156	Tehuacán	Tehuacán	226.258
161	Tepanco de López	Tepanco de López	16.717
169	Tepexi de Rodríguez	Tepexi de Rodríguez	18.145
171	Tepeyahualco de Cuauhtémoc	Tepeyahualco de Cuauhtémoc	2.864
178	Tlacotepec de Benito Juárez	Tlacotepec de Benito Juárez	42.295
182	Tlalnepantla	Tlanepantla	4.198
189	Tochtepec	Tochtepec	17.259
195	Vicente Guerrero	Santa María del Monte	21.164
203	Xochitlán Todos Santos	Xochitlán	5.101
205	Yehualtepec	Yehualtepec	19.368
206	Zacapala	Zacapala	4.407
209	Zapotitlán	Zapotitlán Salinas	8.900
214	Zinacatepec	San Sebastián Zinacatepec	13.641
217	Zoquitlán	Zoquitlán	19.715
