= Xayacatlán =

Xayacatlán may refer to:

- Xayacatlán de Bravo, Puebla
- San Jerónimo Xayacatlán, Puebla
- Xayacatlán Mixtec language
