= San Pedro Yeloixtlahuaca =

San pedro Yeloixtlahuaca
- Municipality
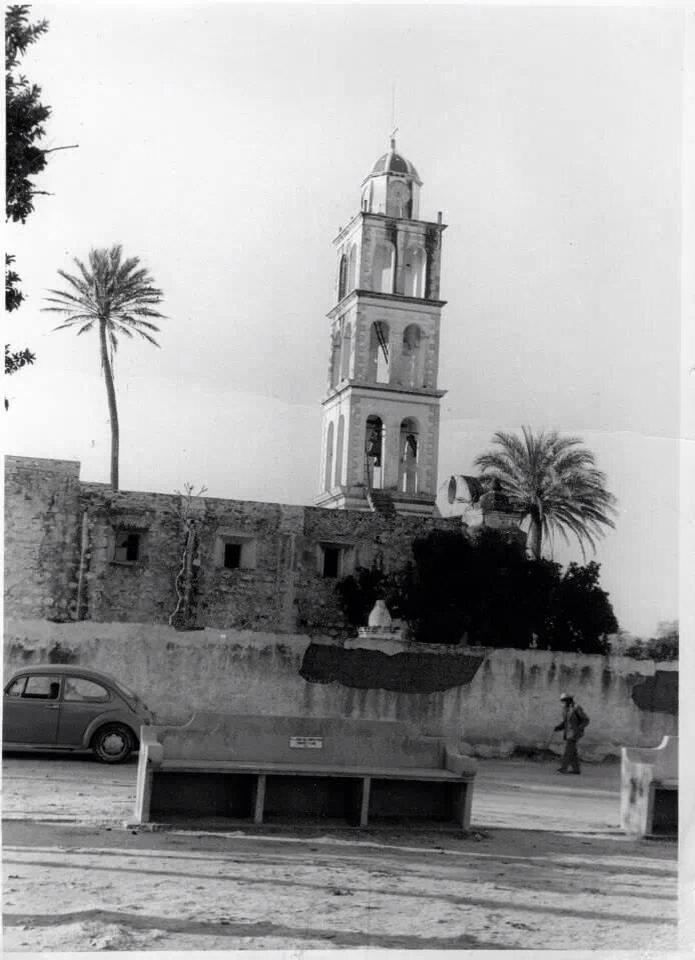
- San Pedro in the 1980s

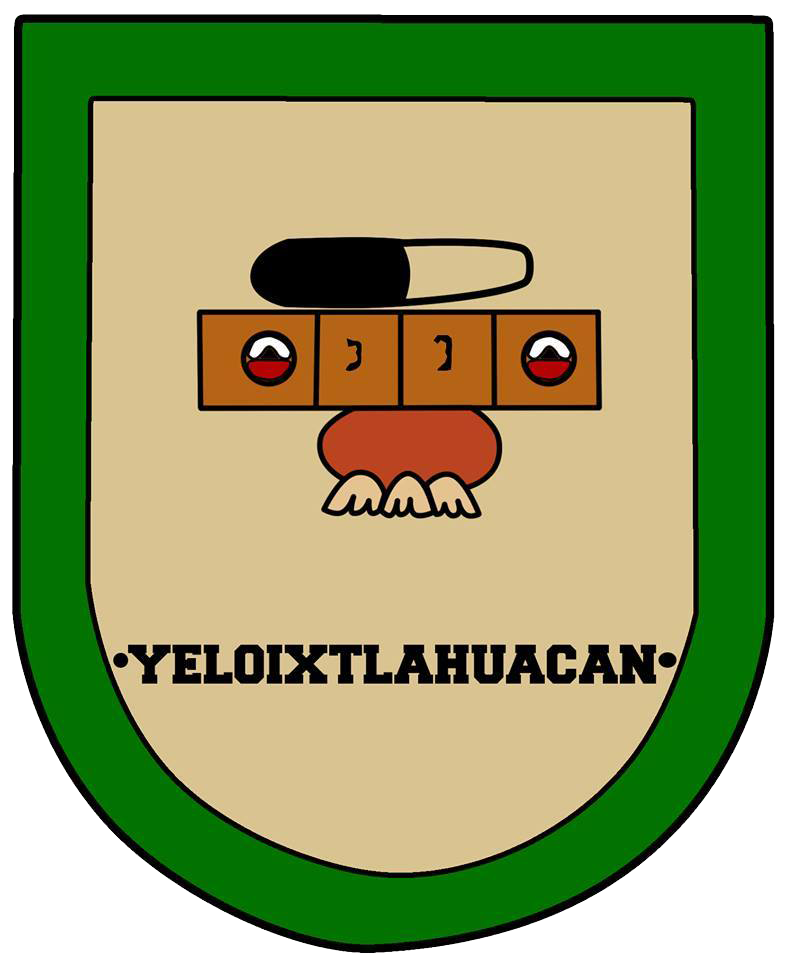
- Coat of arms
- Interactive map of San pedro Yeloixtlahuaca
- Coordinates: 18°07′18″N 98°06′36″W
- Country: Mexico
- State: Puebla

Area
  - Land: 174.890 km^{2} (67.525 sq mi)
- Elevation: 1,120 m (3,670 ft)

Population
  - Total: 3,395
- Time zone: UTC-6 (Zona Centro)
- Postal code: 74960
- Area code: 275
- San Pedro, land of Espiritu Grande

San Pedro Yeloixtlahuaca or Yeloixtlahuacan is a municipality in the south of the Mexican state of Puebla, is part of the Acatlán Valley at the Mixteca Baja Poblana.

Its geographical coordinates are the parallels 17º 59'30 and 18º 07'18 of north latitude and the meridians 97º 58 00 and 98º 06'36 of western longitude.

It has an area of 174.890 square kilometers that places it in place 81 with respect to the other municipalities of the State.

The municipality borders to the north with Acatlán and San Pablo Anicano, to the south with the state of Oaxaca to the west it borders with the municipality of Petlalcingo and Chila and to the west it borders with the municipality of Guadalupe Santa Ana.

Distance to the city of Puebla: 150 km.

In 1984 it was constituted as the free 141 municipality of the state of Puebla.

== History ==
Yeloixtlahuaca is of Nahuatl origin that comes from the words "Yetl": "Tobacco", "Lotl": "expression of quality or property and "ixtlahuatl", that means "Place of the Plain of tobacco" ("or that has tabacal").

The Popolaca and Nahua settlements gave rise to the foundation in the pre-Hispanic era of the population of Yeloixtlahuacan.

It was part of Acatlán de Osorio until February 2, 1984, when it became a free municipality.

The center of the municipality is the town of San Pedro Yeloixtlahuaca.

According with a publication of July 5, 1880 in the Constitution of the Free and Sovereign State of Puebla, San Pedro Yeloixtlahuaca was formed from the town of the same name, the town of Guadalupe (now Guadalupe Santa Ana) and the ranches of Alamo Cuaxilote (now San José Alamo) and Ixcaquiopan (now San José Agua Zarca).

On April 25, 1922, Guadalupe was separated again from San Pedro Yeloixtlahuaca. Guadalupe returned to being a separate municipality.

On December 27, 1927, San Pedro Yeloixtlahuaca was constituted as a municipality of the State of Puebla.

The church dedicated to Saint Peter Apostle dates from the 16th century, is located in the center of the municipality. Calixro Garcia blessed the first stone.

Approximately in 1890 it was erected church. The Archive of this church has documentation from the mid-nineteenth century, the oldest is 1867.

== Geography ==
=== Location ===
The municipality of San Pedro Yeloixtlahuaca, is located in the southern part of the state of Puebla, is part of the Acatlán Valley.

The municipal seat is San Pedro Yeloixtlahuaca.

=== Extension ===
It has an area of '164.59' square kilometers that places it in the place '81' with respect to the other municipalities of the State.

=== Orography ===
The municipality is located within the morphological region of the 'Sierra Mixteca Baja' which constitutes the southern anticline of the syncline that is part of the Acatlán valley The relief of the municipality shows a rather irregular topography with a slope south–north, with discontinuities such as isolated hills and small mountain ranges, highlight the hills: the Chivato, the Magueyera, Coralillo, Matlatepeque and Loma la Pelada.

The height of the municipality ranges between 1,000 and 1,800 meters above sea level.

=== Hydrography ===
The main river that feeds San Pedro is the Petlalcingo, which bathes the north for more than 12 kilometers, serving in a stretch as limit with Acatlán; continues with the valley and joins the Acatlán river, tributary of the Mixteco, one of the main tributaries of the Atoyac.

=== Climate ===
In the municipality three climates are identified:

Warm semi-dry, is presented in the west of the municipality.

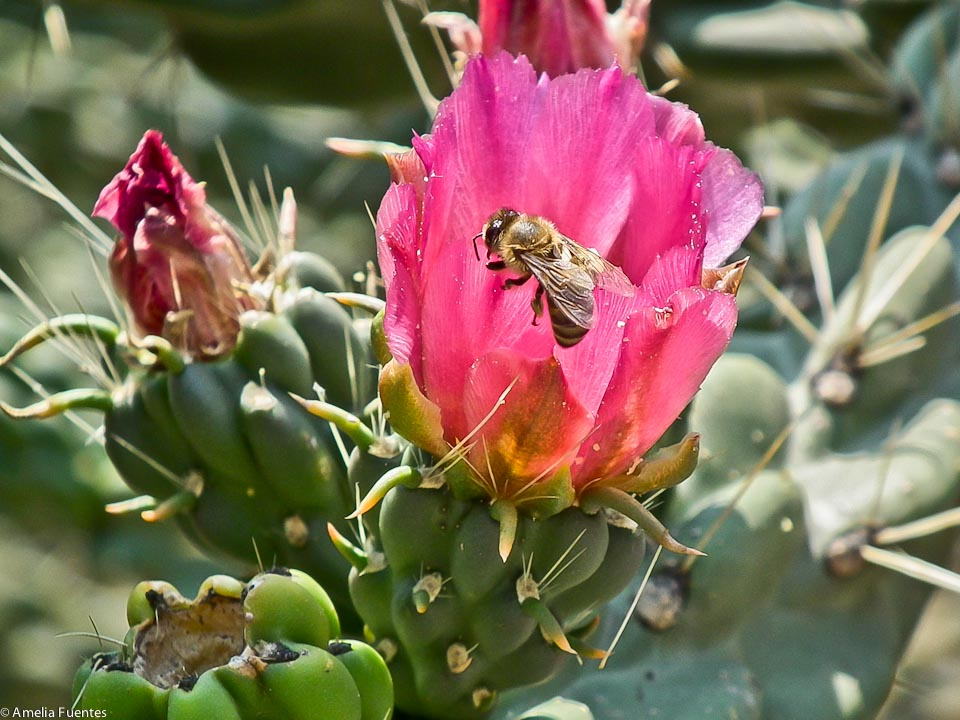
Warm semi-dry.

Warm subhumid, with rain in summer, is presented at the center of the municipality.

Semi-warm climate, with rains in summer, are identified in the extreme southeast of the municipality.

=== Flora and fauna ===
Most of the municipality is covered by low deciduous forest associated with shrub and arboreal secondary vegetation that has been gradually dismantled, to be incorporated into the agricultural activity where corn and peanuts are grown, as well as pastures where goats exist.

Within the fauna we find: the rattlesnake, scorpion, iguana, chameleon, mazacuata, black and white viper, rabbits, tlacuache, fox, coyote, skunk and raccoon. They have also come to see deer.

== Economy ==
=== Farming ===
The municipality produces mainly grains such as corn, beans and peanuts; As for the vegetables, pumpkin, green chili, sugarcane, mango, pitaya, plum, avocado and papaya are grown in fruit growing.

=== Cattle raising ===
With regard to this activity, the municipality has goats, cattle, asses, cattle and a variety of birds.

=== Industry ===
Within the manufacturing industry the municipality has manufacturing clothes for women, bakeries, nixtamal mills and others.

=== Commerce ===
At the head of the municipality is a diversified trade, for the most part the population is supplied in commercial establishments such as groceries and miscellanies, fruits and vegetables, stationers, hardware stores, materials for construction, among others.

=== Services ===
The establishments that offer services are still limited, such as: shops for the preparation of food, mechanical workshops, bicycle repair workshops, as well as pharmacies, and tortillerias.

== Social and communications infrastructure ==
Education

In the municipality counts from preschool, elementary schools, technical secondary, telesecundaria and a high school.

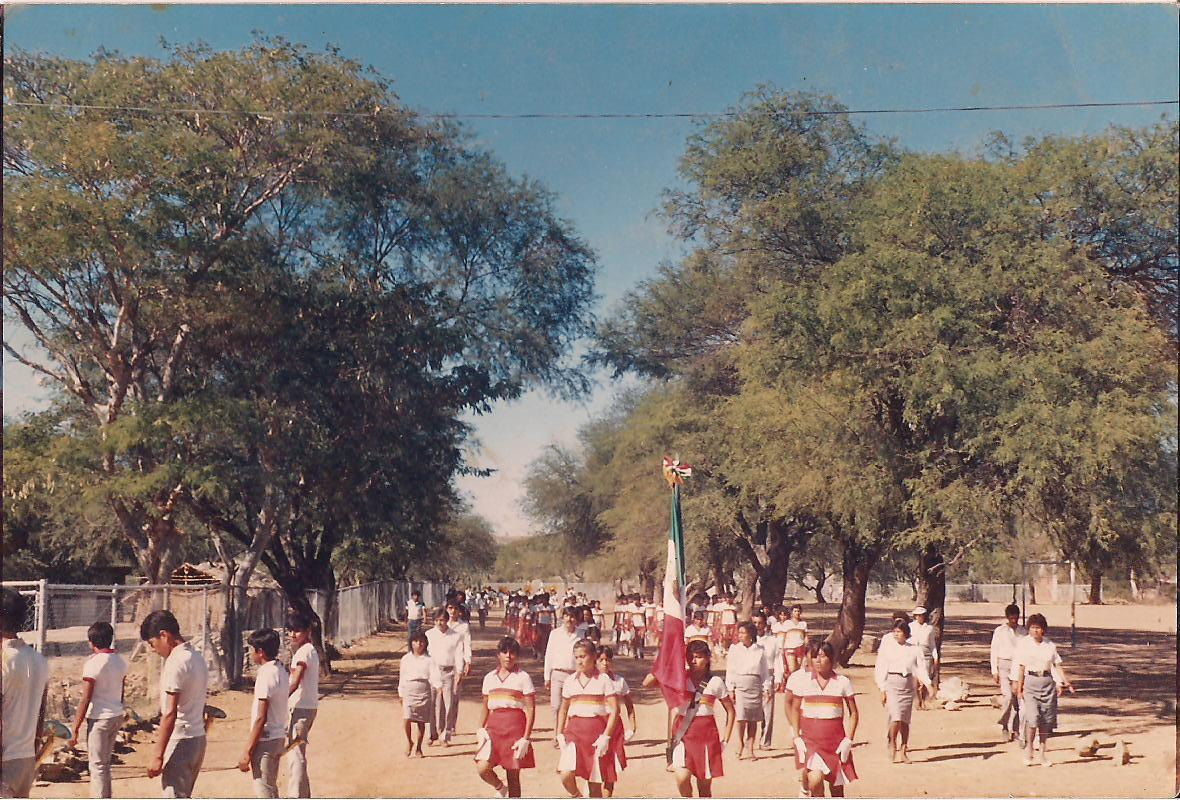
School parade in 90s

Health

The attention given to health in the municipality of San Pedro Yeloixtlahuaca, has a decentralized coverage of 3,100 users of services approximately that is provided through a clinic of IMSS, attended by a doctor and a nurse permanently, in each community there is a health house.

Supply

Different communities in the municipality have CONASUPO stores, that satisfy the needs of the inhabitants of the municipality. In addition to the New Municipal Market located at the head of the municipality and the days of place in each community.

Sports

In sports the municipality counts on recreational spaces of free access to the public that cover the demand in all the communities of the municipality, recreational centers, roofed courts and the field with natural grass located in San Pedro center.

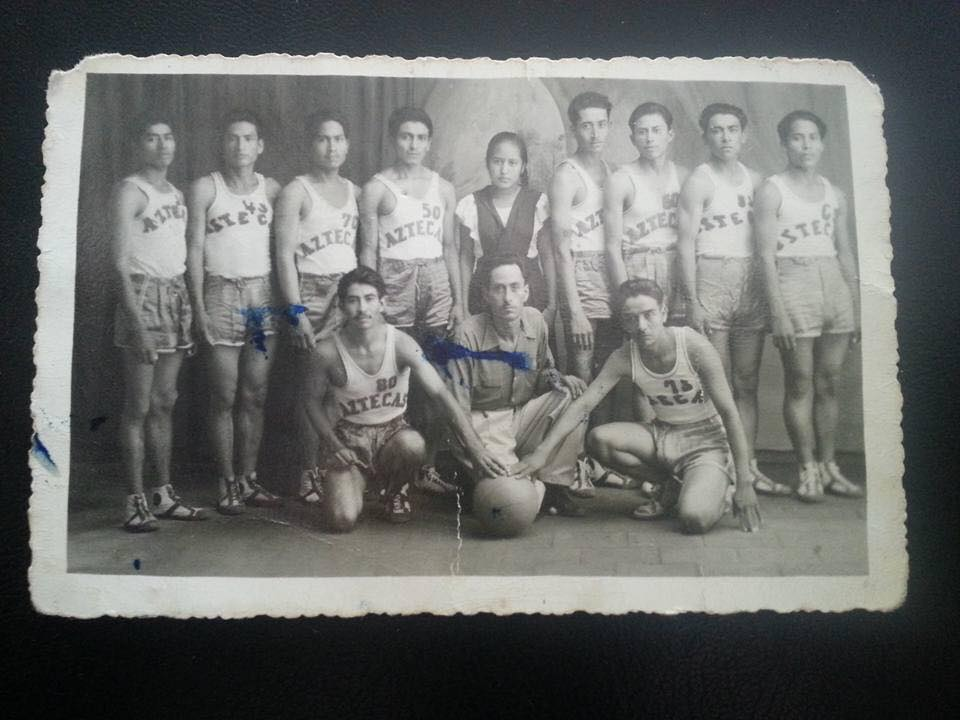
Aztecs San Pedro in 1948

Communications Infrastructure

The municipality counts with Correos de México, telephone, fax, Internet, receives the signal of television and of state and national radio stations. The center of the municipality and some surrounding communities have a cellphone signal for the installation of a cellphone antenna covering about 65% of the municipality.

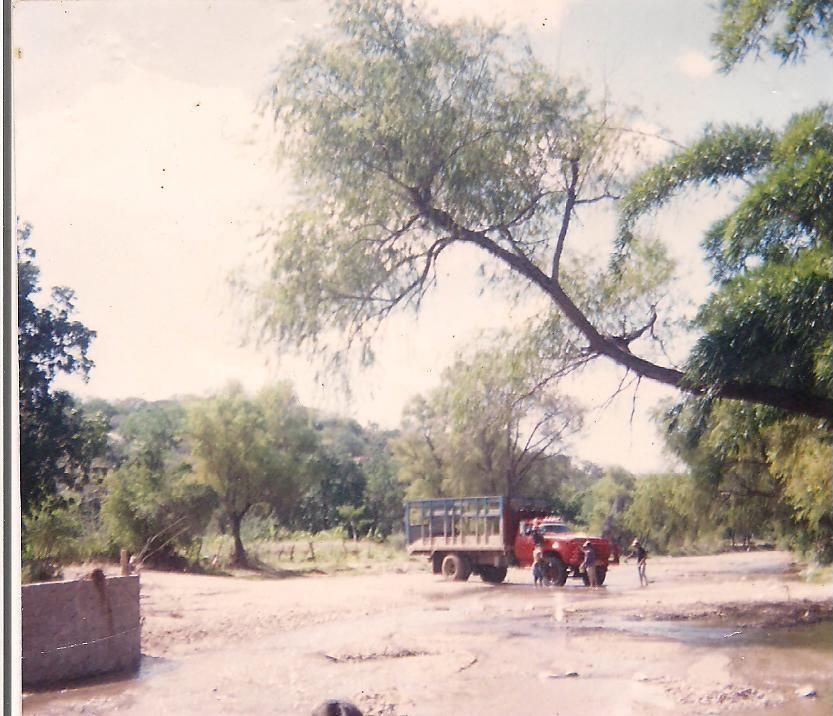
Rio Petlalcingo to "La Tercera" in 1990

Routes of Access to the municipality

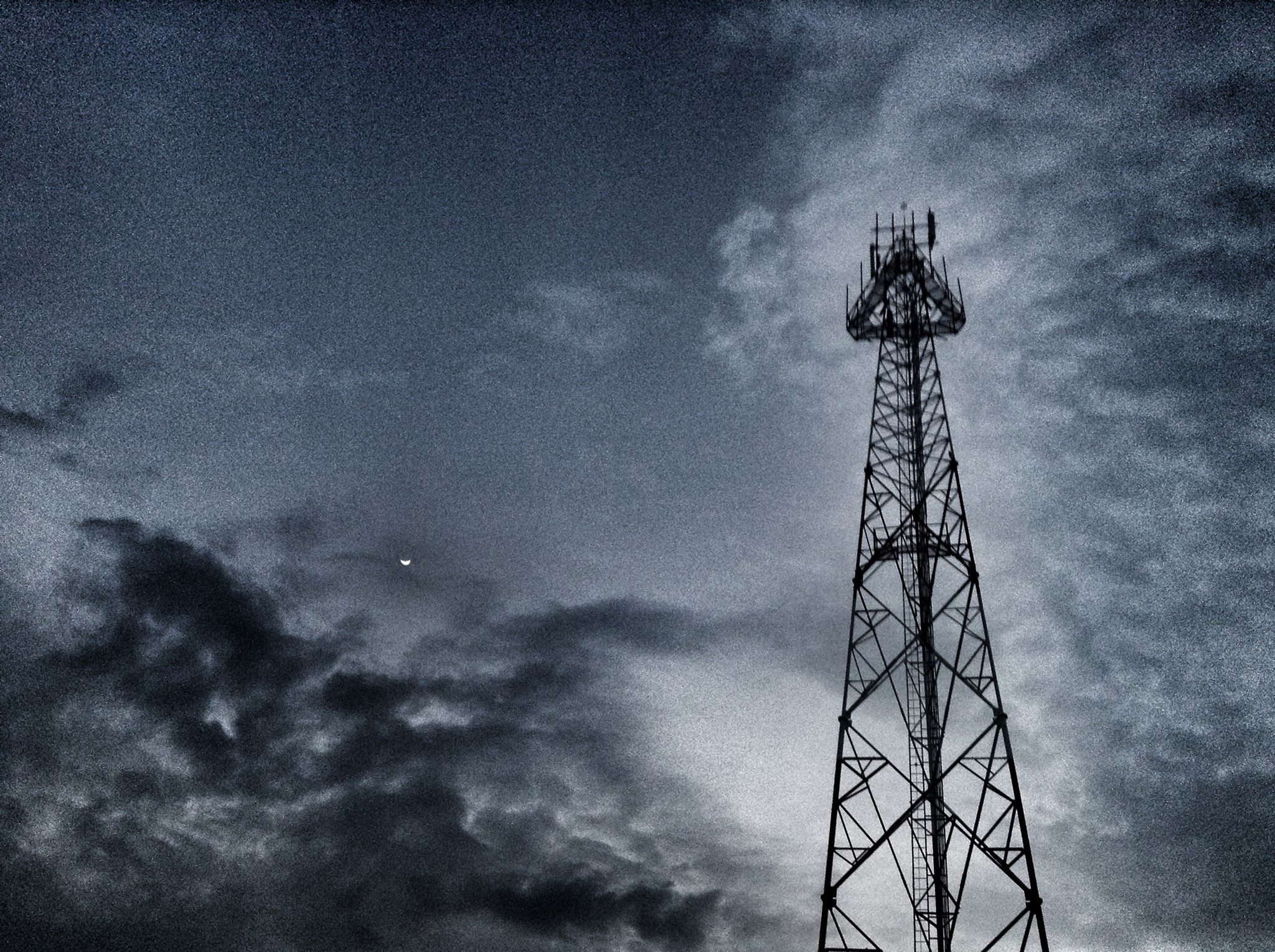
Cell phone antenna

From the head of the municipality depart two secondary roads; one of them goes into the territory communicating to the populations, the other crosses the limits with Acatlán connecting with the 190 Federal Pan-American Highway. There are also roads that connect the municipality with the state of Oaxaca.

Public security

The municipality counts with a municipal police force that operates with operations within the municipality, in turn it supports the operations in conjunction with the state police and the national army.

== Culture ==
=== Festivals and traditions ===
==== Popular festivities ====
On June 29 is the patronal festivity, it is celebrated with prayers, flowers, pyrotechnic games, "La Feria" and sports. Also jaripeo and bands of music, popular dance, processions and dances of "Tecuanis".

Saint Peter Apostle

On March 19 is the patron saint festival of San José Álamo, celebrated with "La Feria", sports, prayers, jaripeo and the traditional "baile"

In May it is celebrated in San Isidro to its annual festival, it is celebrated with pyrotechnic, sports games, bands of music and folklor.

In December, San Cristóbal celebrates his annual festival, celebrated with rites, jaripeo, horse races, sports games and the traditional year-end "baile".

==== Traditions ====
In November 1 and 2, is celebrated in the municipality to All Saints and Faithful Dead, with offerings and floral ornaments in the municipal pantheon.

=== Gastronomy ===
The main typical dishes of the municipality are: mole poblano and pipían verde with barbecue and pork carnitas.

All year long there are fruits like: Papaya, Watermelon, Mango, Pitaya, Plum, Avocado, Chico Zapote, Tuna and more.

Pitaya and Mango

And vegetables like: Tomato, Rabano, Cilantro and others.

== Government ==
San Pedro Yeloixtlahuaca has 10 Locations, these are the most important:

San Pedro Yeloixtlahuaca, San Juan Llano Grande, San Isidro Labrador and San José Álamos.

Political Regionalization

It is part of the socioeconomic region number VI of Izúcar de Matamoros, and to the local district number 12 and to the 14 Federal Electoral. It is part of the health jurisdiction number 08 and corde 08 corresponding to Acatlán. It also belongs to the judicial District number I, with head in Acatlán.

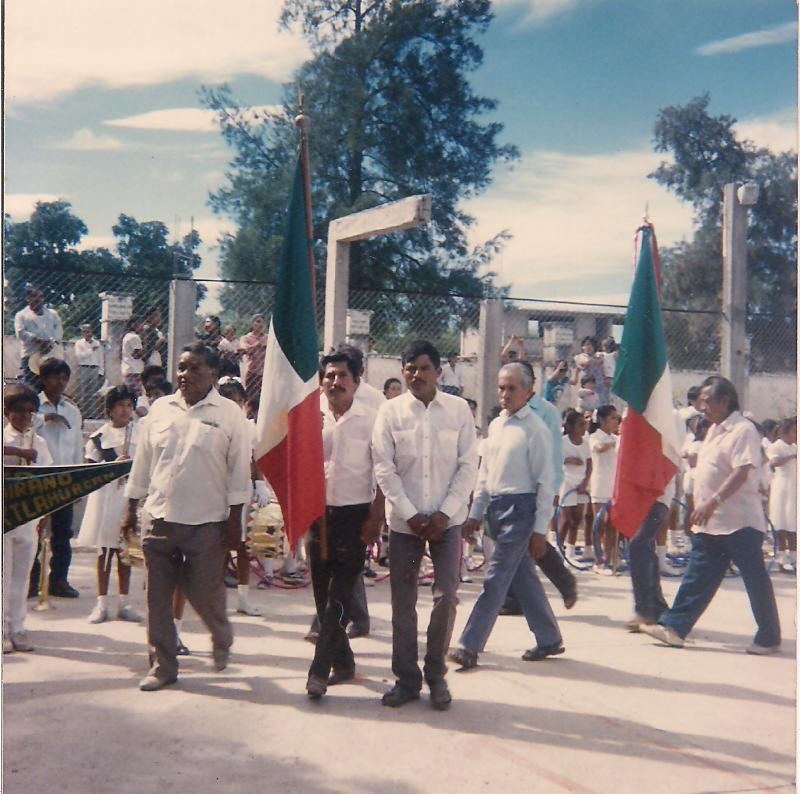
organizations in parade for the Mexican Revolution

Women in the politics of the Municipality

All the Municipal Presidents have been men in the history of San Pedro. San Pedro is an open municipality in terms of the inclusion of women in municipal politics.

The most important women in the politics of the municipality are:

Araceli Hernández Velazquez wife of ex-president Pedro Arturo Reyes Vargas who in 2009 participated as candidate for district 14.

In the 2014 elections for municipal president, San Pedro had for the first time a female candidate to municipal president, the teacher Evangelina Enriquez Escamilla.

Presidents of the Municipality

- Ernesto Solis. 1939-1942
- Telésforo Hernández. 1942-1945
- Maurilio Vargas Ambrosio. 1945-1948
- Epigmenio Medina Huerta. 1948-1951
- Espiridión Pérez. 1951-1954
- Rosendo Ramos. 1954-1957
- Manuel C. Hernández. 1957-1960
- Pedro Martínez Rosas. 1960-1963
- Felipe Velázquez Vidals. 1963-1966
- Leobardo Ambrosio Nieto. 1966-1969
- Mucio Ambrosio Velazco. 1969-1972
- Elias Fuentes Pérez. 1972-1975
- Elias Ramírez Velazco. 1975-1978
- Delfino Vargas Velazco. 1978-1981
- Alberto E. Velazco Vargas 1981-1984
- Gil Velázquez Ramírez. 1984-1987
- Rigoberto Escamilla Velázquez. 1987-1990
- Fausto Rendón Vargas. 1990-1993
- Mariano Reyes Espinosa. 1993-1996
- Leonel Barragán Reyes. 1996-1999
- René Javier Ambrosio Rojas. 1999-2002
- Delfino Ramírez Ambrosio. 2002-2005
- Atanacio. Jaime Rendón Tapia. 2005-2008 First opposition president in San Pedro.
- Martin Rafael Martínez Ríos. 2008-2011
- Pedro Arturo Reyes Vargas. 2011-2014
- Orozco Oliverio Espinoza Ambrosio. 2014-2018 (current)

== See also ==
- Municipalities of Puebla
- Regions of Puebla
- San Pablo Anicano
- Acatlán de Osorio
- Petlalcingo
