= Totoltepec =

Totoltepec may refer to:

- San Andrés Totoltepec, Mexico City
- San Martín Totoltepec, Puebla
- Totoltepec de Guerrero, Puebla
