= Jorge Estefan Chidiac =

Mexican politician

- Born: 3 July 1963 (age 63); Acatlán de Osorio, Puebla, Mexico
- Occupation: Politician
- Political party: PRI

Charbel Jorge Estefan Chidiac (born 3 July 1963) is a Mexican politician from the Institutional Revolutionary Party (PRI). He represented Puebla's 14th congressional district, centered on Izúcar de Matamoros, as a federal deputy in the 63rd session of Congress (2015–2018).

== Life ==
Estefan graduated from the Instituto Tecnológico Autónomo de México (ITAM) in 1984 with a degree in economics and taught the discipline at the ITAM, the Universidad Popular Autónoma del Estado de Puebla and Universidad de las Américas Puebla. He advanced quickly as an economist; in 1988, he presided over the National College of Economists and also served as its foreign secretary. His party career also started; in 1992, he coordinated finances for the PRI's Puebla gubernatorial campaign before moving on to become subsecretary of finances for the state party. Between 1993 and 2000, Estefan was the president of the Puebla Institute of Public Administration.

In the mid-1990s, Estefan presided over international operations at the Puebla Banking Center, where he also served as treasurer and vice president. He also served in the PRI as the vice president of the state political council and a district delegate.

In 1997, voters sent Estefan to the Chamber of Deputies for the first time, for the 57th Congress, representing Puebla's 13th district centered on his birthplace of Acatlán de Osorio. He sat on a variety of commissions, primarily financial, such as Programming, Budget and Public Accounts; Finances and Public Credit; Special to Investigate the Mexican Social Security Institute; and Special to Investigate the Federal Electricity Commission and Central Light and Power. While a deputy, Estefan obtained his master's degree in municipal- and state-level public administration from the National Public Administration Institute, and he also briefly served as the PRI's national subsecretary of social management.

In the early 2000s, Estefan returned to various civil service positions, mostly in the Mexican Social Security Institute (IMSS). He coordinated advisors, headed the Institutional Linkage Unit, and between 2002 and 2005, was a regional director for southern Mexico. He left the IMSS in 2005 in order to serve as the Secretary of Social Development of Puebla, a position he abandoned in order to run again for the Chamber of Deputies, this time from the 14th district based in Izúcar de Matamoros. In the 60th Congress, which met from 2006 to 2009, Estefan presided over the Finances and Public Credit Commission and sat on those dealing with Social Development, Social Security, and Budget and Public Accounts.

After his second tour in San Lázaro, Estefan spent two years as the PRI's national finance secretary. He abandoned the position in 2012 to become the director general of the National Savings and Financial Services Bank (BANSEFI), a development bank that promotes saving and financial inclusion.

In 2015, Estefan resigned from BANSEFI in order to make a third successful run for the Chamber of Deputies, again representing the 14th district. In the 63rd Congress, Estefan presided over the Infrastructure Commission and served on two others: Finances and Public Credit, and Budget and Public Accounts. In March 2016, he left the Economy Commission.

In March 2016, the PRI in Puebla tapped Estefan as its new president, replacing Isabel Allende Cano, who left in order to take a position in the federal government.

== Personal ==
Estefan's son, Charbel Estefan López, sits on the city council of San Andrés Cholula.
