= Juan Manuel Vega Rayet =

Mexican politician

- Born: 22 September 1959 (age 66); Izúcar de Matamoros, Puebla, Mexico
- Occupation: Politician
- Political party: PRI

Juan Manuel Vega Rayet (born 22 September 1959) is a Mexican politician affiliated with the Institutional Revolutionary Party (PRI). In the 2003 mid-terms he was elected to the Chamber of Deputies to represent Puebla's 14th district during the 59th session of Congress.
