= Javier Filiberto Guevara =

Mexican politician

Javier Filiberto Guevara González
- Born: 3 December 1965 (age 60); Izúcar de Matamoros, Puebla, Mexico
- Occupation: Politician
- Political party: PRI

Javier Filiberto Guevara González (born 3 December 1965) is a Mexican politician affiliated with the Institutional Revolutionary Party (PRI). In the 2012 general election he was elected to the Chamber of Deputies to represent Puebla's 14th district during the 62nd session of Congress.
