= Tehuitzingo =

- Municipality
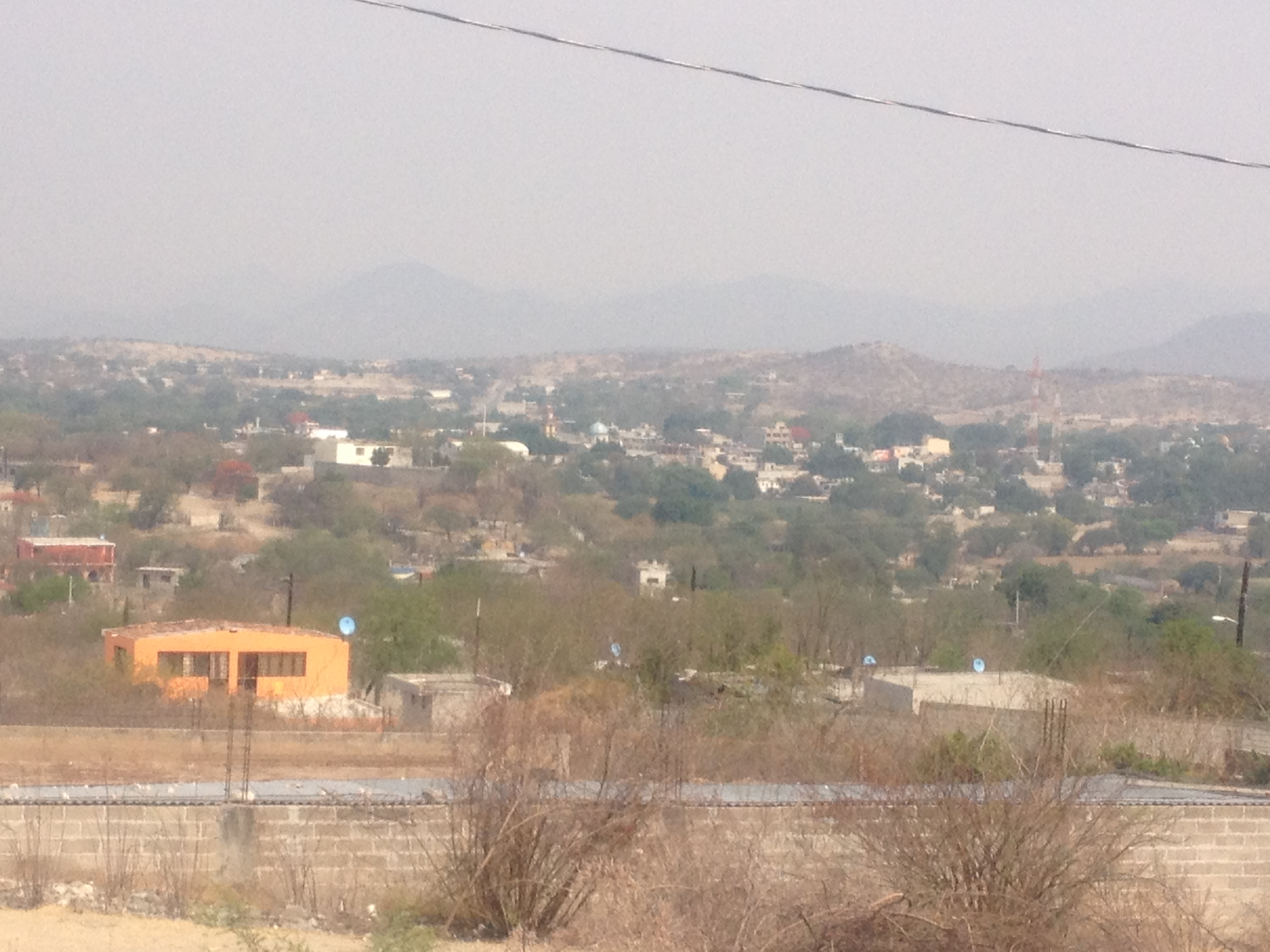
- Tehuitzingo, 2013

- Location within Puebla (state) Location within Mexico
- Coordinates: 18.3319°N 98.2756°W
- Country: Mexico
- State: Puebla

Government
  - Federal electoral district: Puebla's 14th
- Time zone: UTC-6 (Zona Centro)
- Website: https://ayuntamientotehuitzingo.gob.mx/

Tehuitzingo is a municipality in the Mexican state of Puebla.
