= Tulcingo =

Coordinates: 18.0347°N 98.4461°W

- Municipality and town
- Interactive map of Tulcingo
- Country: Mexico
- State: Puebla
- Time zone: UTC-6 (Zona Centro)

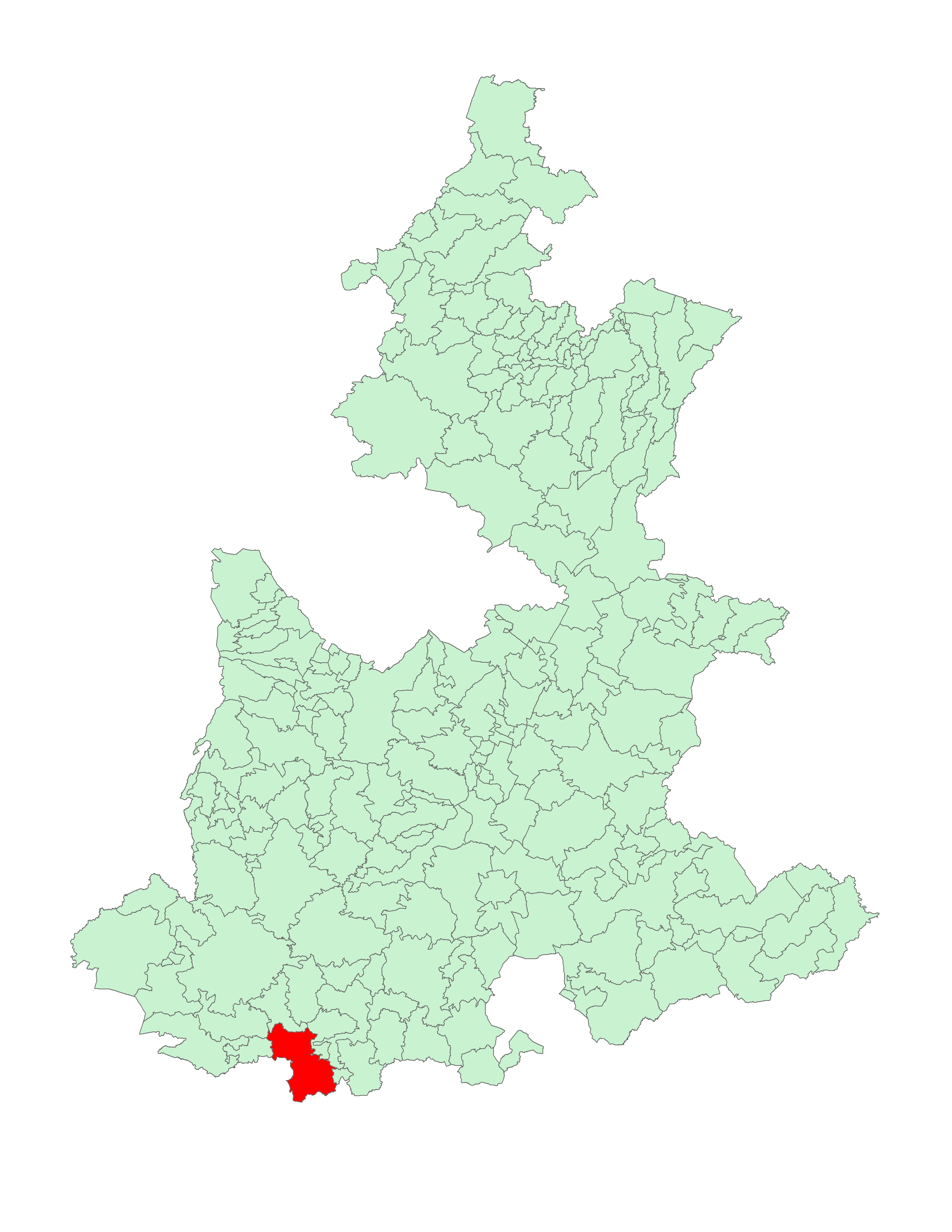
Tulcingo municipality in the Mexican state of Puebla

Tulcingo is a town and municipality in the Mexican state of Puebla.

Tulcingo De Valle (in Náhuatl: tolli-tzintli-co, ‘tule-pequeño-lugar’ ‘in a small space’)’ is located within the municipal state of Puebla, in the central oriental of Mexico. To the north, Tulcingo is located close to Chila de la sal (“head ground salts of spices”); to the east, is Tecomatlan (“Pot made of Stone); towards the south is the state of Guerrero, and Oaxaca is in the west, in the municipality of Albino Zertuche. A part of the Mixtec Poblana, it forms part of the migrant population based in the United States.

== Geography ==
The municipality occupies a zone of dry land, which is part of the province of ancient Mixtec land, in the Sierra Madre del Sur mountains (“mother’s Farm of the South”). In between the valleys, there are important mounds with the Tecomate region. Tulcingo contains a permanent important water landmark, in the river Tecoloyan, a tributary of the River Atoyac, within the River Tlapeneco system. The rivers form a major part of the low plane Mixtec Poblana. During the hot seasons, the rivers commonly dry up. Because of the rivers, agriculture thrives in the Selva baja caduciofolia.
