= Chigmecatitlán =

Municipality and town in Puebla, Mexico

Chigmecatitlan
- Municipality and town
- Coat of arms

- Location in Mexico
- Country: Mexico
- State: Puebla
- Time zone: UTC-6 (Zona Centro)

Chigmecatitlan is a town and municipality in the Mexican state of Puebla. It has a population of 1,137 people and covers an area of 28.06 square kilometres (10.83 sq mi).
