= La Magdalena Tlatlauquitepec =

Coordinates: 18°45′N 98°06′W

- Municipality and town
- Interactive map of La Magdalena Tlatlauquitepec
- Country: Mexico
- State: Puebla
- Time zone: UTC-6 (Zona Centro)

La Magdalena Tlatlauquitepec is a town and municipality in the Mexican state of Puebla.

The BUAP has a Foreign Academic Unit there.
