= Ahuatlán =

Coordinates: 18.5731°N 98.2558°W

Ahuatlán Municipality
- Municipality
- Coat of arms

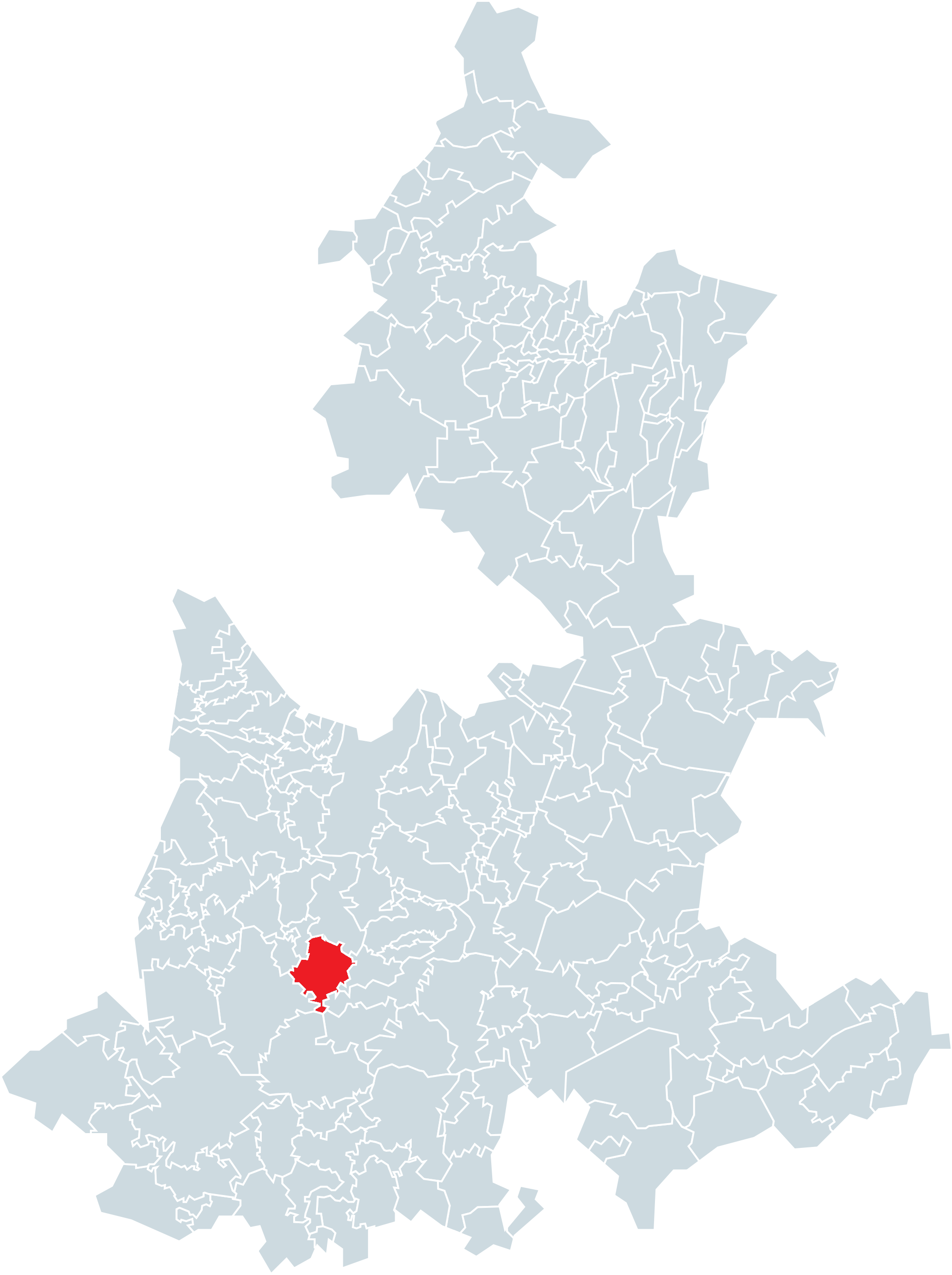
- Location of the municipality in Puebla
- Country: Mexico
- State: Puebla
- Time zone: UTC-6 (Zona Centro)

Ahuatlán is a municipality in the Mexican state of Puebla.

== History ==
In prehispanic times, Ahuatlan was a Nahuatl-speaking town that eventually became subject to the Aztec Empire, being the capital of one of the smallest provinces which also included San Lucas Tejaluca and San Pablo Zoyaltitlapanan. The local inhabitants hunted game, produced small amounts of cochineal, and paid tribute in cane shields. Cotton was purchased from Izucar de Matamoros and salt from Piaxtla.
