= Huatlatlauca =

Coordinates: 18°40′N 98°03′W

- Municipality
- Interactive map of Huatlatlauca
- Country: Mexico
- State: Puebla
- Time zone: UTC-6 (Zona Centro)

Huatlatlauca is a municipality in the Mexican state of Puebla.
