= Cuayuca de Andrade =

Coordinates: 18.4442°N 98.1919°W

- Municipality
- Coat of arms
- Interactive map of Cuayuca de Andrade
- Country: Mexico
- State: Puebla
- Time zone: UTC-6 (Zona Centro)

Cuayuca de Andrade is a municipality in the Mexican state of Puebla.

== Geography ==
Cuayuca de Andrade has an area of 160.75 km^{2}. It is bordered to the south and east by the municipality of Tehuitzingo, to the west by Santa Inés Ahuatempan and to the north by Zacapala and Ahuatlán. It is part of the Izúcar de Matamoros region. The territory of the municipality is located between the Acatlán mountain range and the Tepexi plains, and has its highest altitude in the east. From there, the slope goes down to the bed of the Atoyac River, where the lowest altitude is found.
