= Chietla Municipality =

Chietla
- Municipality
- Coat of arms

- Location of the municipality in Puebla

- Location in Mexico
- Coordinates: 18°31′8″N 98°34′47″W
- Country: Mexico
- State: Puebla
- Founded: 1895

Government
  - Municipal president: Edgardo Ponce Cortes

Area
  - Total: 276.82 km^{2} (106.88 sq mi)
- Elevation: 1,079 m (3,540 ft)

Population
  - Total: 36,606
  - Density: 132.24/km^{2} (342.49/sq mi)
- Time zone: UTC-6 (Zona Centro)

Chietla is a municipality in the Mexican state of Puebla.
