= Teotlalco, Puebla =

Coordinates: 18.0000°N 98.0000°W

Teotlalco
- Town and municipality
- Interactive map of Teotlalco
- Country: Mexico
- State: Puebla
- Time zone: UTC-6 (Zona Centro)
- Website: ayuntamientodeteotlalco.gob.mx

Teotlalco is a town and its surrounding municipality in the Mexican state of Puebla.

The name contains the Nahuatl elements teo (god), tlalli (land) and co (locative suffix).

The wife of Emperor Moctezuma II was also named Teotlalco.
