= Tecomatlán =

Coordinates: 18.1153°N 98.3139°W

- Municipality and town
- Interactive map of Tecomatlán
- Country: Mexico
- State: Puebla
- Time zone: UTC-6 (Zona Centro)

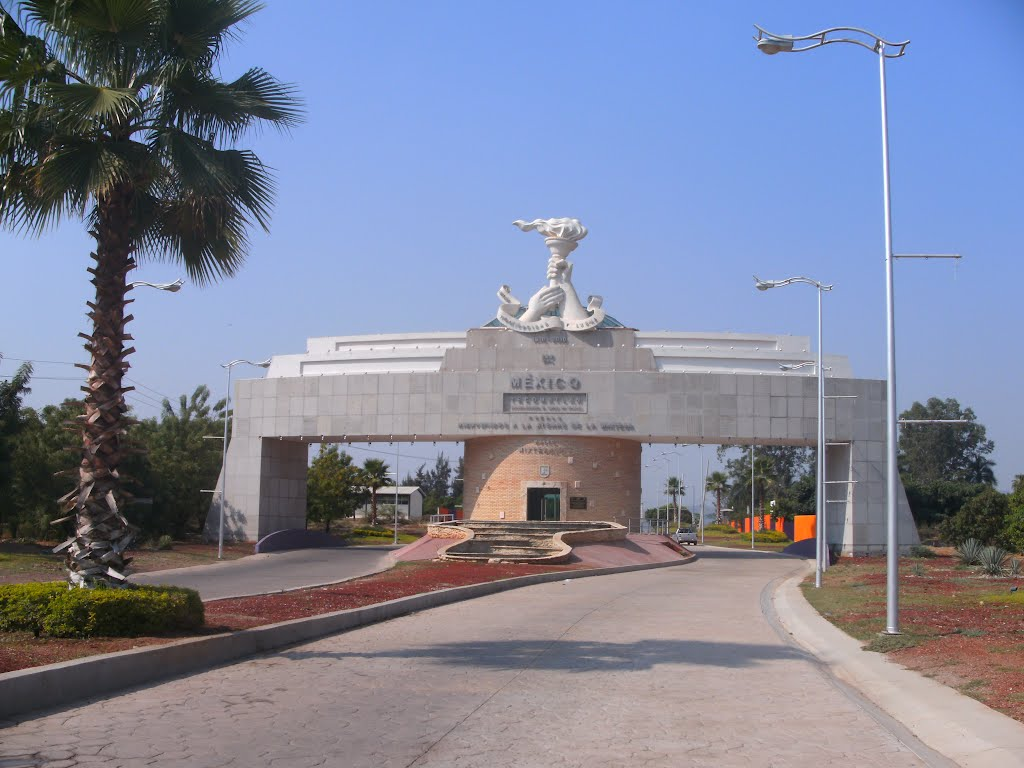
Arch at the entrance of Tecomatlán.

Tecomatlán is a town in the south of the Mexican state of Puebla. It serves as the seat for the surrounding municipality of the same name.
