= Guadalupe, Puebla =

Coordinates: 18°5′22″N 98°7′13″W

Guadalupe Santa ana
- Municipality and town
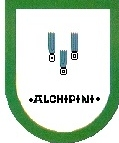
- Coat of arms

- Location of the municipality in Puebla
- Country: Mexico
- State: Puebla
- Time zone: UTC-6 (Zona Centro)

Guadalupe is a town and municipality in the Mexican state of Puebla.
