= Santa Catarina Tlaltempan =

Coordinates: 18.6171°N 98.0796°W

- Municipality and town
- Interactive map of Santa Catarina Tlaltempan
- Country: Mexico
- State: Puebla
- Time zone: UTC-6 (Zona Centro)

Santa Catarina Tlaltempan is a town and municipality in the Mexican state of Puebla.
