= Teopantlán =

Coordinates: 18°43′N 98°16′W

Teopantlán Santiago Teopantlán
- Municipality and town
- Location of the Teopantlán municipality highlighted in black within the state of Puebla, Mexico.
- Interactive map of Teopantlán
- Country: Mexico
- State: Puebla
- Time zone: UTC-6 (Zona Centro)

Teopantlán is a town and municipality in the Mexican state of Puebla.
