= Tepeojuma =

Coordinates: 18°43′N 98°27′W

- Municipality and town
- Interactive map of Tepeojuma
- Country: Mexico
- State: Puebla
- Time zone: UTC-6 (Zona Centro)

Tepeojuma is a town and municipality in the Mexican state of Puebla.
