= Ixcamilpa de Guerrero =

Coordinates: 18.0308°N 98.6957°W

- Municipality and town
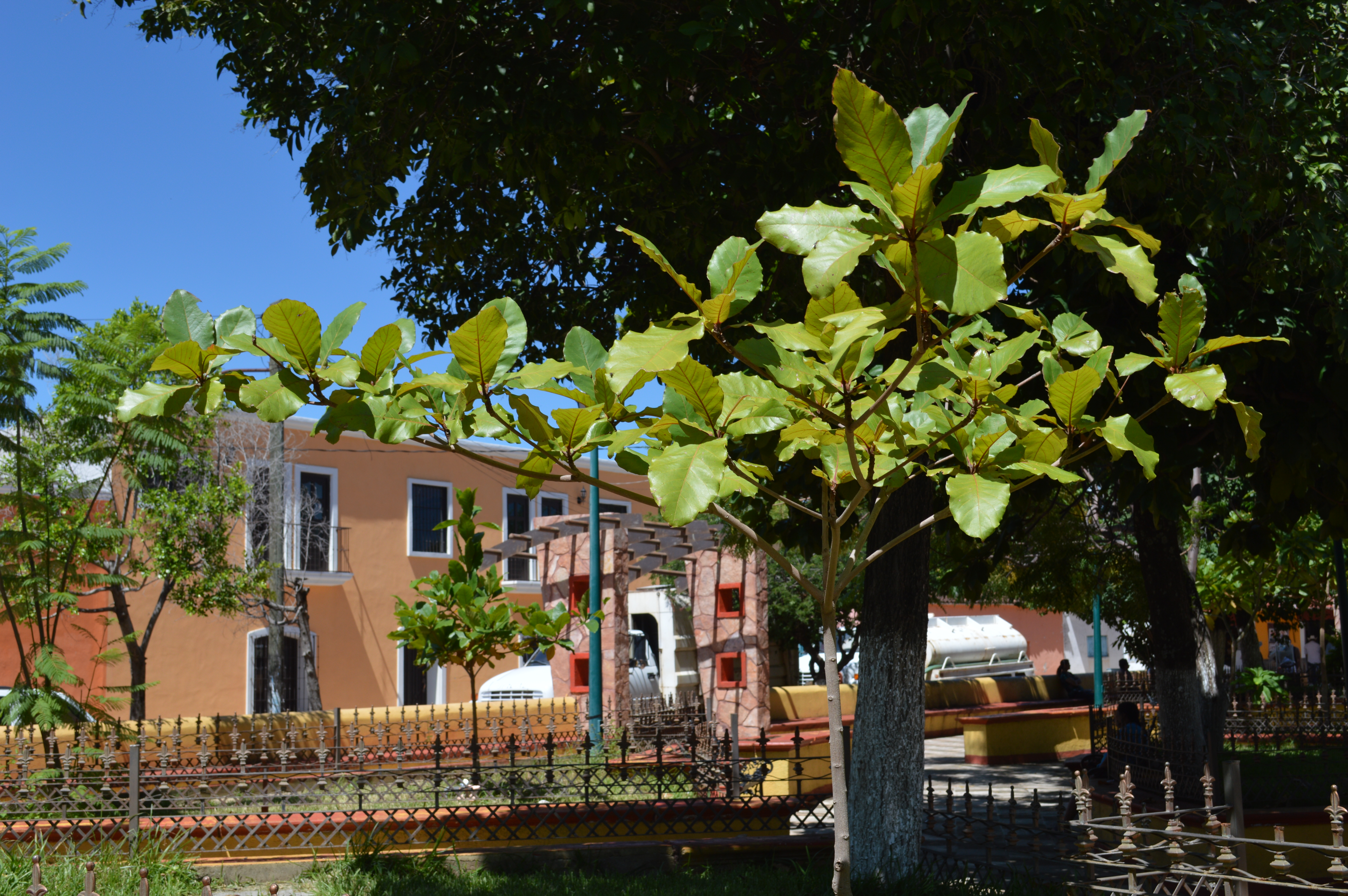
- Interactive map of Ixcamilpa de Guerrero
- Country: Mexico
- State: Puebla
- Time zone: UTC-6 (Zona Centro)

Ixcamilpa de Guerrero is a municipality in the Mexican state of Puebla.
