= Huehuetlán el Chico =

Coordinates: 18°22′N 98°42′W

- Municipality and town
- Location of the municipality in Puebla
- Country: Mexico
- State: Puebla
- Time zone: UTC-6 (Zona Centro)

Huehuetlán el Chico is a town and municipality in the state of Puebla.
