= Axutla =

- Municipality and town
- Coat of arms

- Location of the municipality in Puebla

- Location in Mexico
- Coordinates: 18°11′21″N 98°23′25″W
- Country: Mexico
- State: Puebla
- Time zone: UTC-6 (Zona Centro)

Axutla is a town and municipality in the Mexican state of Puebla.
