= San Diego la Meza Tochimiltzingo =

Coordinates: 18.8000°N 98.3167°W

- Municipality and town
- Interactive map of San Diego la Meza Tochimiltzingo
- Country: Mexico
- State: Puebla
- Time zone: UTC-6 (Zona Centro)

San Diego la Meza Tochimiltzingo is a town and municipality in the Mexican state of Puebla.
