= Xochiltepec =

Coordinates: 18.6567°N 98.3525°W

- Municipality and town
- Coat of arms
- Interactive map of Xochiltepec
- Country: Mexico
- State: Puebla
- Time zone: UTC-6 (Zona Centro)

Xochiltepec is a town and municipality in the Mexican state of Puebla.
