= Atzala =

Coordinates: 18.5464°N 98.5531°W

- Municipality and town

- Coat of arms
- Interactive map of Atzala
- Country: Mexico
- State: Puebla
- Time zone: UTC-6 (Zona Centro)

Atzala is a town and municipality in the Mexican state of Puebla.
