= Huehuetlán el Grande =

Coordinates: 24.8164°N 107.3781°W

- Municipality and town
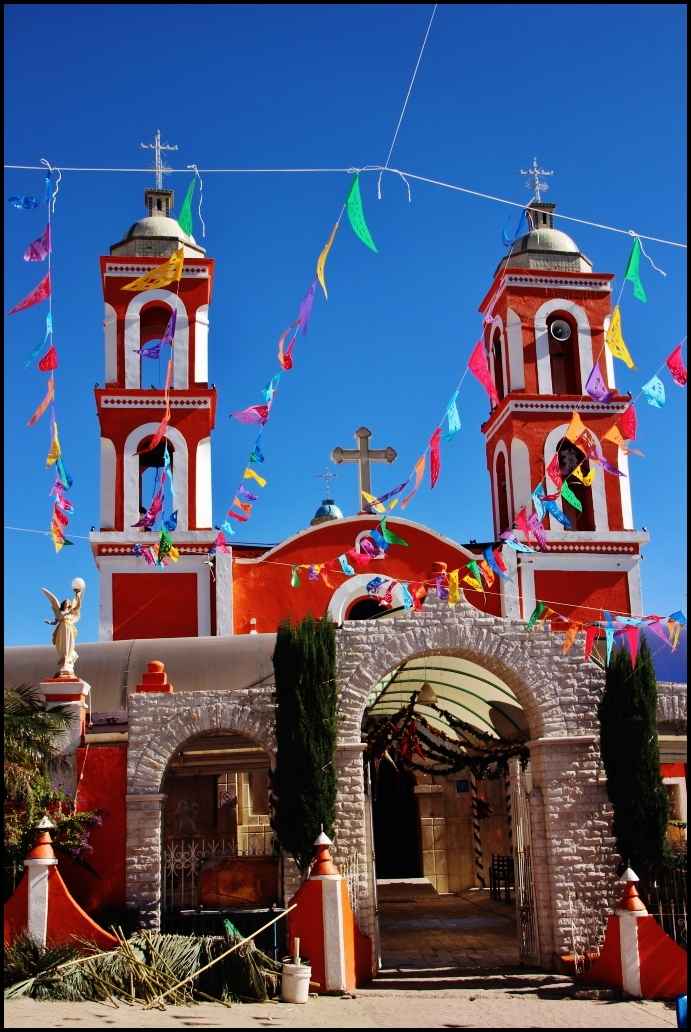

- Location of the municipality in Puebla
- Country: Mexico
- State: Puebla
- Time zone: UTC-6 (Zona Centro)

Huehuetlán el Grande is a town and municipality in the Mexican state of Puebla.
