= Epatlán =

Coordinates: 18°38′N 98°22′W

- Municipality
- Location of the municipality in Puebla
- Country: Mexico
- State: Puebla
- Time zone: UTC-6 (Zona Centro)

Epatlán is a municipality in the Mexican state of Puebla.
