= Santa Inés Ahuatempan =

Coordinates: 18°25′N 98°01′W

- Municipality and town
- Interactive map of Santa Inés Ahuatempan
- Country: Mexico
- State: Puebla
- Time zone: UTC-6 (Zona Centro)

Santa Inés Ahuatempan is a town and municipality in the Mexican state of Puebla.

The municipality covers an area of km².

As of 2005, the town had a total of 5646 residents.
