= Chila de la Sal =

Coordinates: 18°07′N 98°29′W

- Municipality
- Location of the municipality in Puebla
- Coordinates: 18.10975, -98.48574
- Country: Mexico
- State: Puebla

Area
  - Total: 199.01 km^{2} (76.84 sq mi)
- Elevation Average elevation approx. 3,471 ft; elevation variation up to 1,171 ft within 2 miles, 3,248 ft within 10 miles, and 7,123 ft within 50 miles: 945 m (3,100 ft)

Population (2020)
  - Total: 1,317
- Time zone: UTC-6 (Zona Centro)
- Topography: Terrain characterized by significant elevation variation; mountainous surroundings with nearby valleys
- Vegetation: Predominantly low deciduous forest (approx. 82% within 2 miles), with secondary shrubs and small areas of oak thickets
- Climate: Hot year-round; temperatures typically range from 54°F to 93°F, rarely below 47°F or above 99°F
- Rainfall: Rainy season from mid-April to mid-November, peaking in September (~6.0 inches); dry season from mid-November to mid-April, with minimal rainfall (~0.1 inches in December)
- Hydrography: Presence of brine springs supporting traditional artisanal salt mining
- Natural Features: Area known for Cretaceous-period fossil deposits ("abundance of snails"), contributing to local geological identity

Chila de la Sal is a municipality in the Mexican state of Puebla.

The hieroglyph of the population comes from the Nahuatl words "cili", caracolito, and "la", particle abundance; which means "Abundance of snails" referring to the fact that in this place there are plenty of snails of which some are petrified from the Cretaceous, with an antiquity of 3,000,000 years.

Founded in antiquity by Mixtecos and Nahua groups; it was submitted in 1522 by the Spaniards, it was entrusted to Luis de Velázquez and Amado Quino.

At the end of the 16th century it was elevated to the category of town, head of the bishopric of Puebla. In 1750 it was under the jurisdiction of Chilapa.

Salt is extracted, a circumstance for which it is called Chila se la Sal.

The insurgent Miguel Bravo, was banished by the royalist Félix de la Madrid and taken to Puebla in 1814.

In the parish priest of the Church, of Madrid he shot Don Zenón Valdés, Sergeant Major Herrera and Don José Antonio Valdieso, priest of Ocuitulco, on March 15, 1814.

It appears as a municipality in 1895, when it was part of the old district of Chiautla.

Tourist attractions:

Historical monuments:

The parish church, in adoration of Lord Santiago, built in the 16th century.

Parties:

On July 23, patronal feast, in honor of Lord Santiago; May 2 and 3, the day of the Holy Cross

Music:

Band music

Craftsmanship:

Pottery of pots, casseroles and pots.

Gastronomy:

Foods: Mole Poblano, pipián and enjococado, jocoque, tamales, tlaxcales and chileatole.

Sweets: Sweets of Creole plum and ham.
