= San Miguel Ixitlán =

Coordinates: 18°00′N 97°46′W

- Municipality
- Location of the municipality in Puebla
- Country: Mexico
- State: Puebla

Government
  - Municipal President: 20px | link = Movimiento Regeneración Nacional Áurea María Várgas Guerrero (2018–2021)

Area
- 73.016 km^{2} (28.192 sq mi)

Population (2010)
  - Total: 586
- Time zone: UTC-6 (Zona Centro)

San Miguel Ixitlán (Mixtec: Ñuusaha, 'Place at the Foot') is a municipality in the Mexican state of Puebla. It is one of 217 municipalities in the state of Puebla. It was founded on 4 October 1926.
