= Ahuehuetitla =

Coordinates: 18°13′N 98°14′W

Ahuehuetitla Municipality
- Municipality
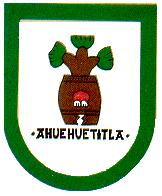
- Coat of arms

- Location of the municipality in Puebla
- Country: Mexico
- State: Puebla
- Time zone: UTC-6 (Zona Centro)

Ahuehuetitla is a municipality in the Mexican state of Puebla.
