= Xicotlán =

Coordinates: 18°04′N 98°32′W

- Municipality and town
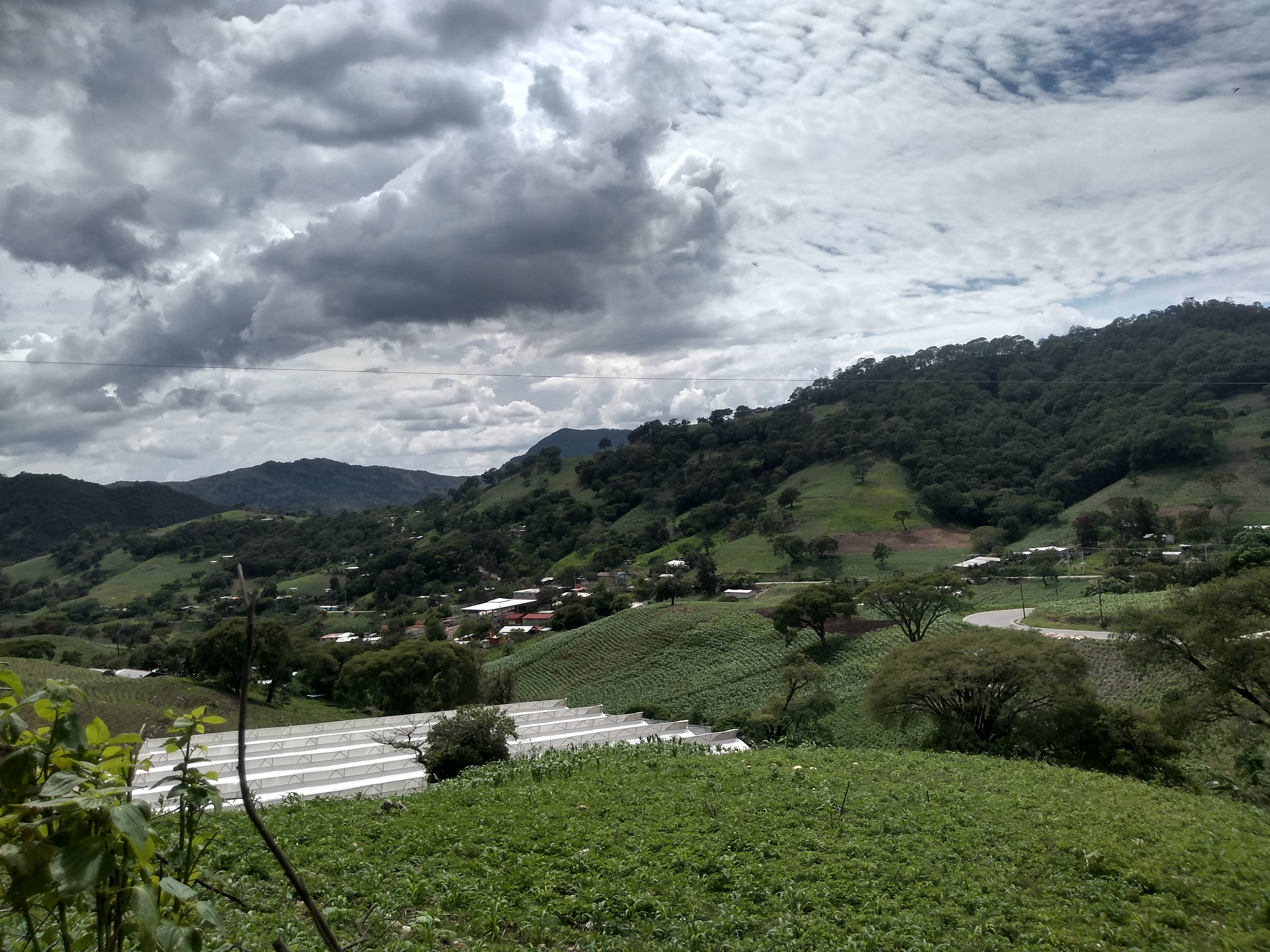

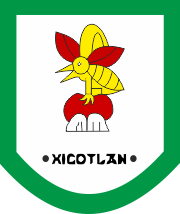
- Coat of arms
- Interactive map of Xicotlán
- Country: Mexico
- State: Puebla
- Time zone: UTC-6 (Central Standard Time)

Xicotlán is a town and municipality in the Mexican state of Puebla.
