= Zacapala =

Coordinates: 18°35′N 98°04′W

- Municipality and town
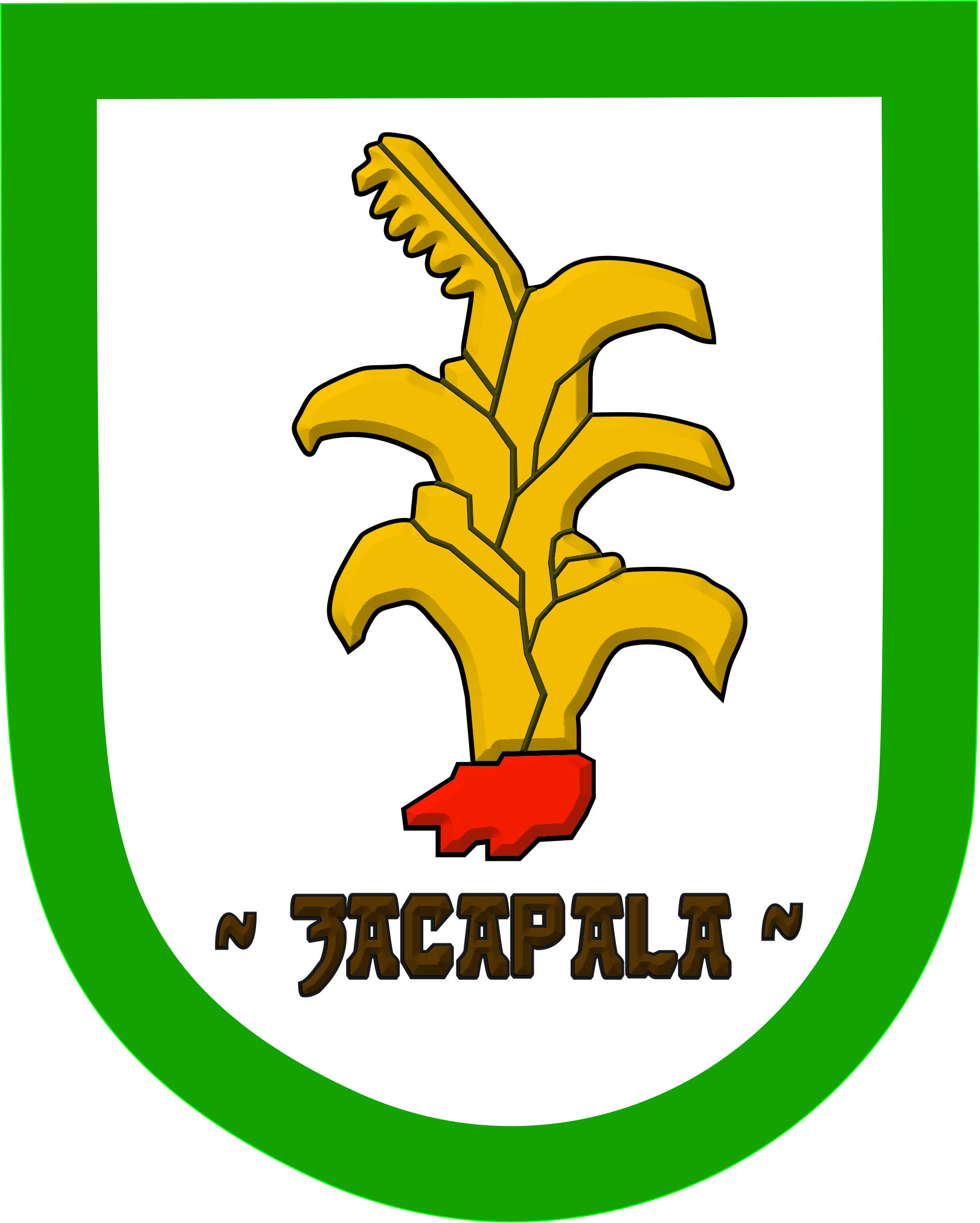
- Coat of arms
- Interactive map of Zacapala
- Country: Mexico
- State: Puebla
- Time zone: UTC-6 (Zona Centro)

Zacapala is a town and municipality in the Mexican state of Puebla.
