= Coatzingo =

Coordinates: 18°37′N 98°11′W

- Municipality and town
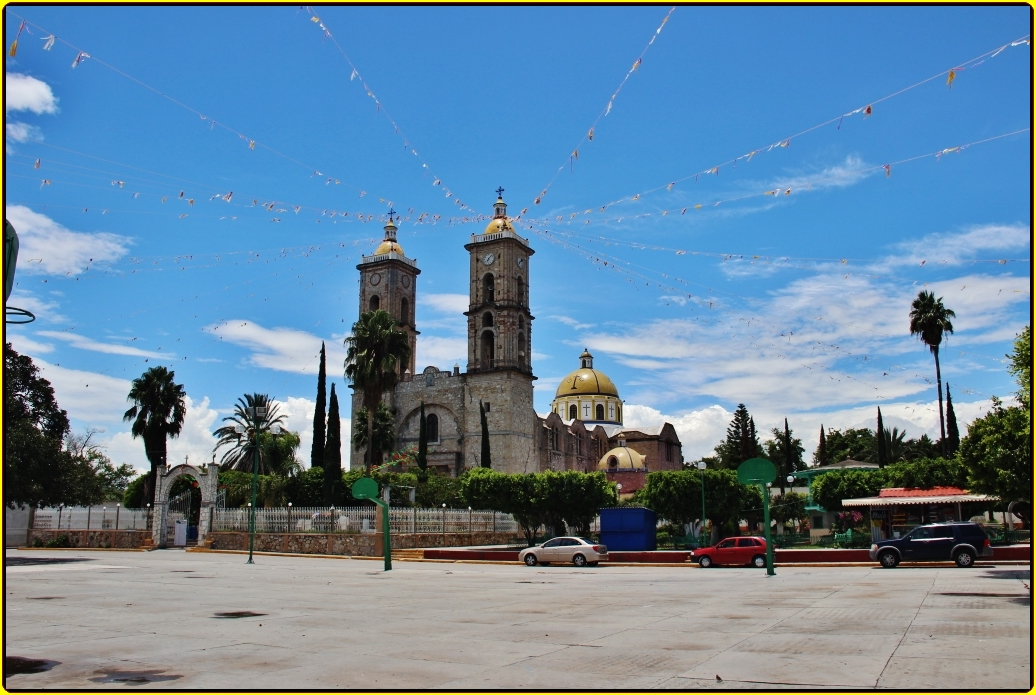

- Coat of arms

- Location of the municipality in Puebla
- Country: Mexico
- State: Puebla

Population (2020)
  - Total: 2,820
- Time zone: UTC-6 (Zona Centro)

Coatzingo is a town and municipality in the Mexican state of Puebla.
