= Ocoyucan =

Coordinates: 18°58′N 98°17′W

- Municipality
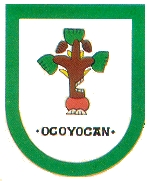
- Coat of arms
- Interactive map of Ocoyucan
- Country: Mexico
- State: Puebla

Population (2020)
  - Total: 42,669
- Time zone: UTC-6 (Zona Centro)

Ocoyucan is a municipality in the Mexican state of Puebla.
