= San Pablo Anicano =

Coordinates: 18°07′N 98°05′W

- Municipality and town
- Coat of arms
- Interactive map of San Pablo Anicano
- Country: Mexico
- State: Puebla
- Time zone: UTC-6 (Zona Centro)

San Pablo Anicano is a town and municipality in the Mexican state of Puebla.
