= Totoltepec de Guerrero =

- Municipality and town
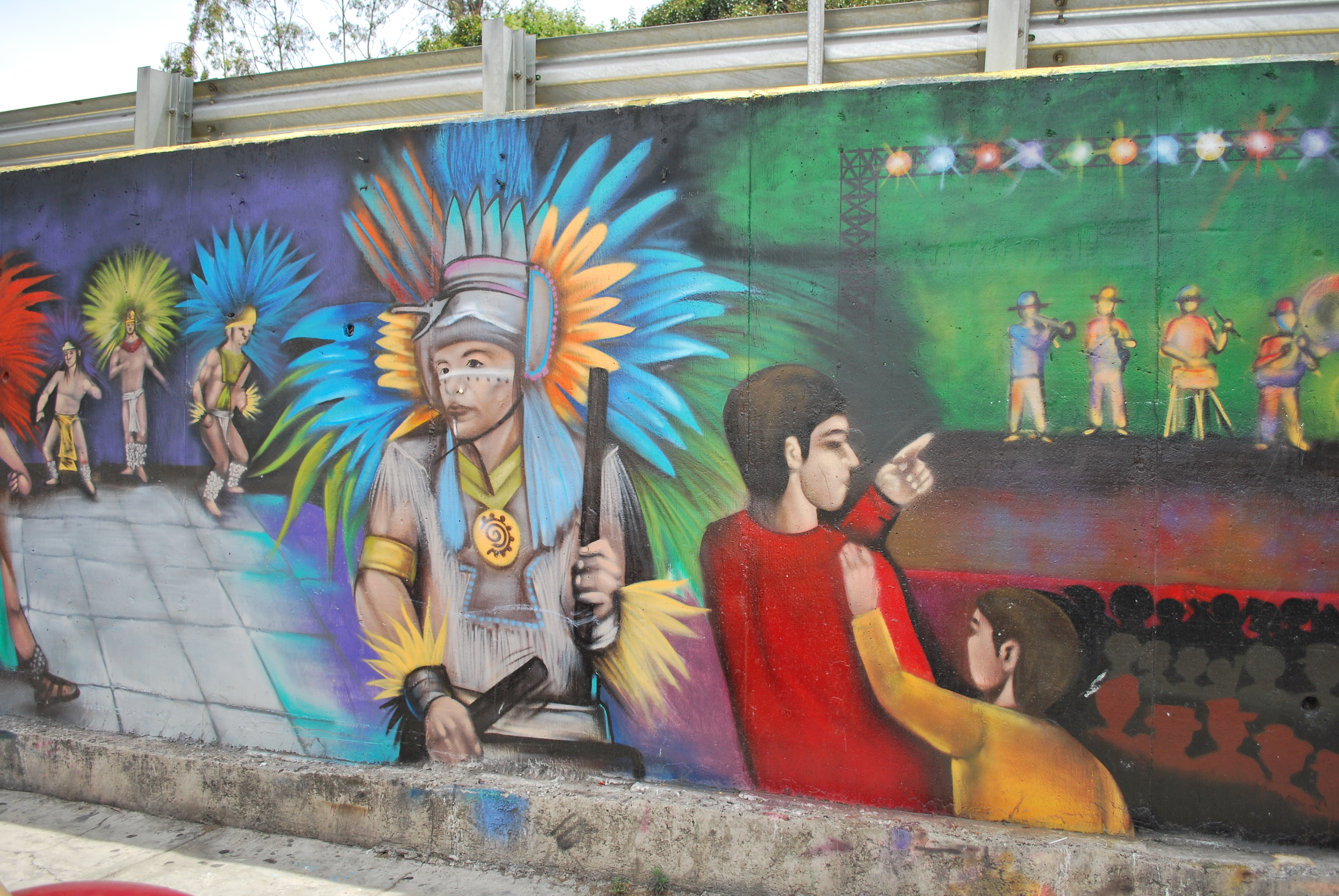
- Murals in Totoltepec

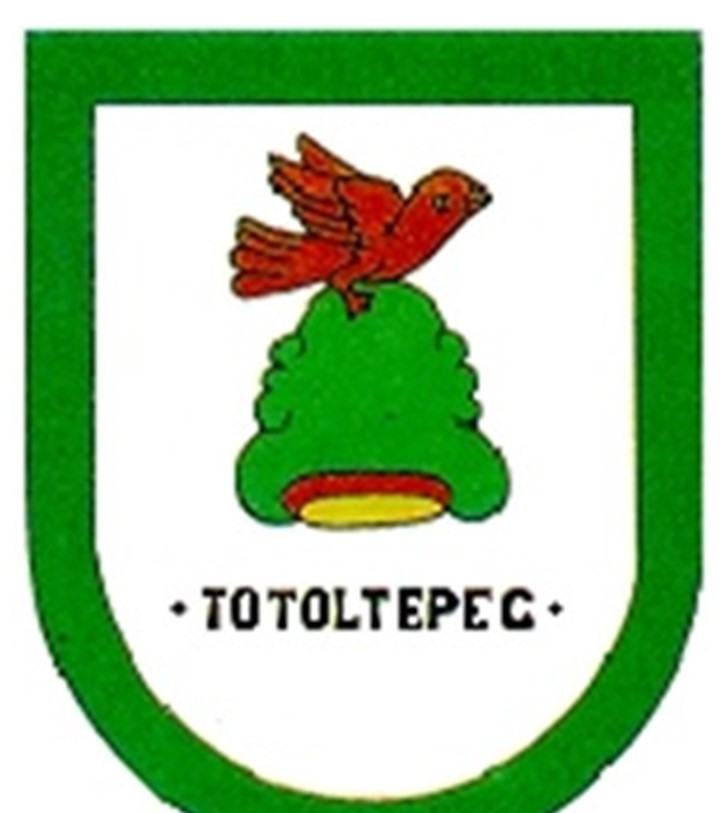
- Coat of arms

- Location within Puebla (state) Location within Mexico
- Country: Mexico
- State: Puebla
- Time zone: UTC-6 (Central Standard Time)
- Website: https://totoltepecdegropue.gob.mx/

Totoltepec de Guerrero is a town and municipality in the Mexican state of Puebla.

The name "Totoltepec" contains the Nahuatl words tototl (bird or fowl) and tepetl (hill).
