= Petlalcingo =

Coordinates: 18°05′N 97°54′W

- Municipality and town
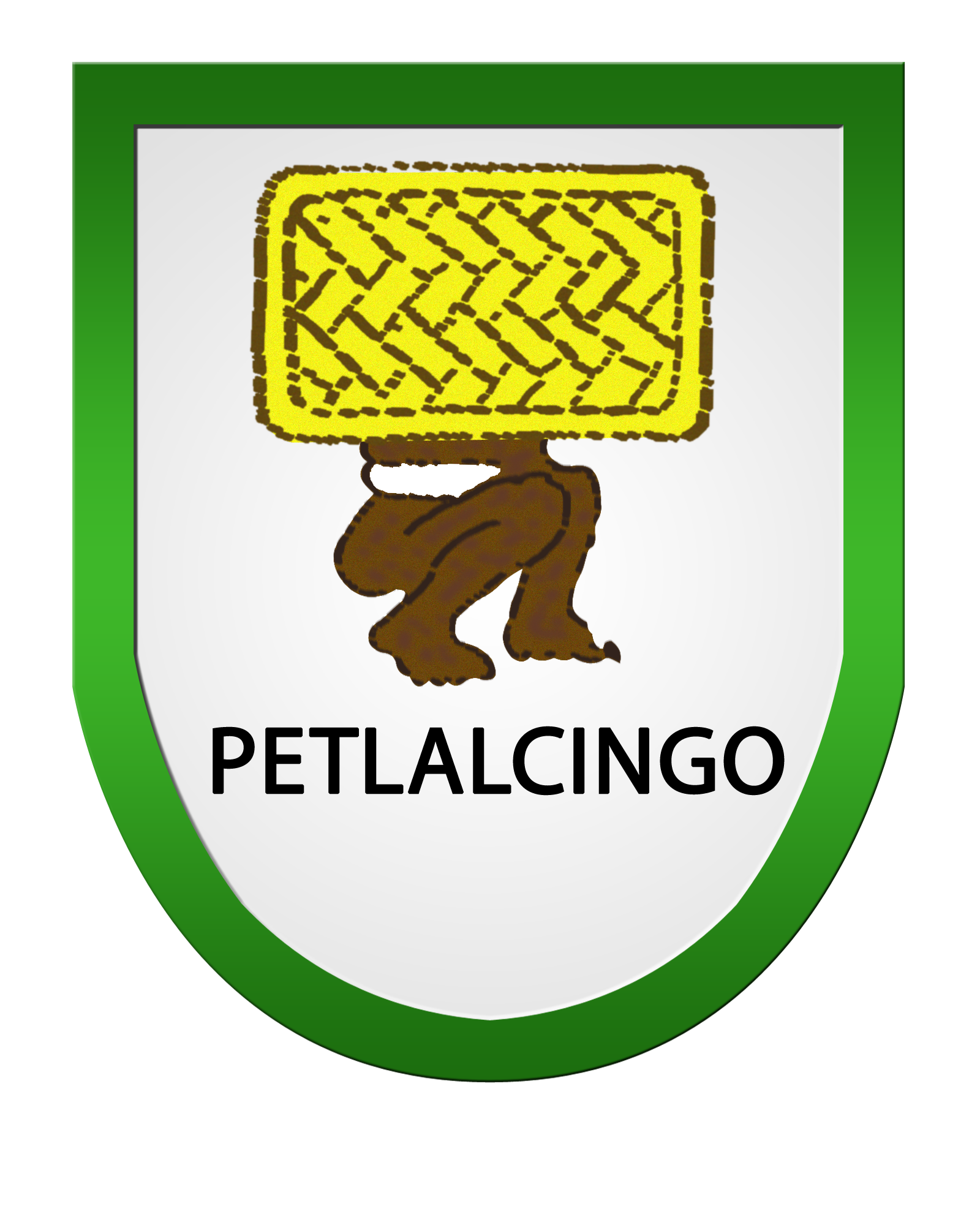
- Coat of arms
- Interactive map of Petlalcingo
- Country: Mexico
- State: Puebla
- Time zone: UTC-6 (Zona Centro)

Petlalcingo (Mixtec: Ñuuyuvui, 'Place of the Mats') is a town and municipality in Puebla in eastern Mexico.
