= Xayacatlán de Bravo =

Coordinates: 18°15′N 97°58′W

- Municipality and town
- Interactive map of Xayacatlán de Bravo
- Country: Mexico
- State: Puebla

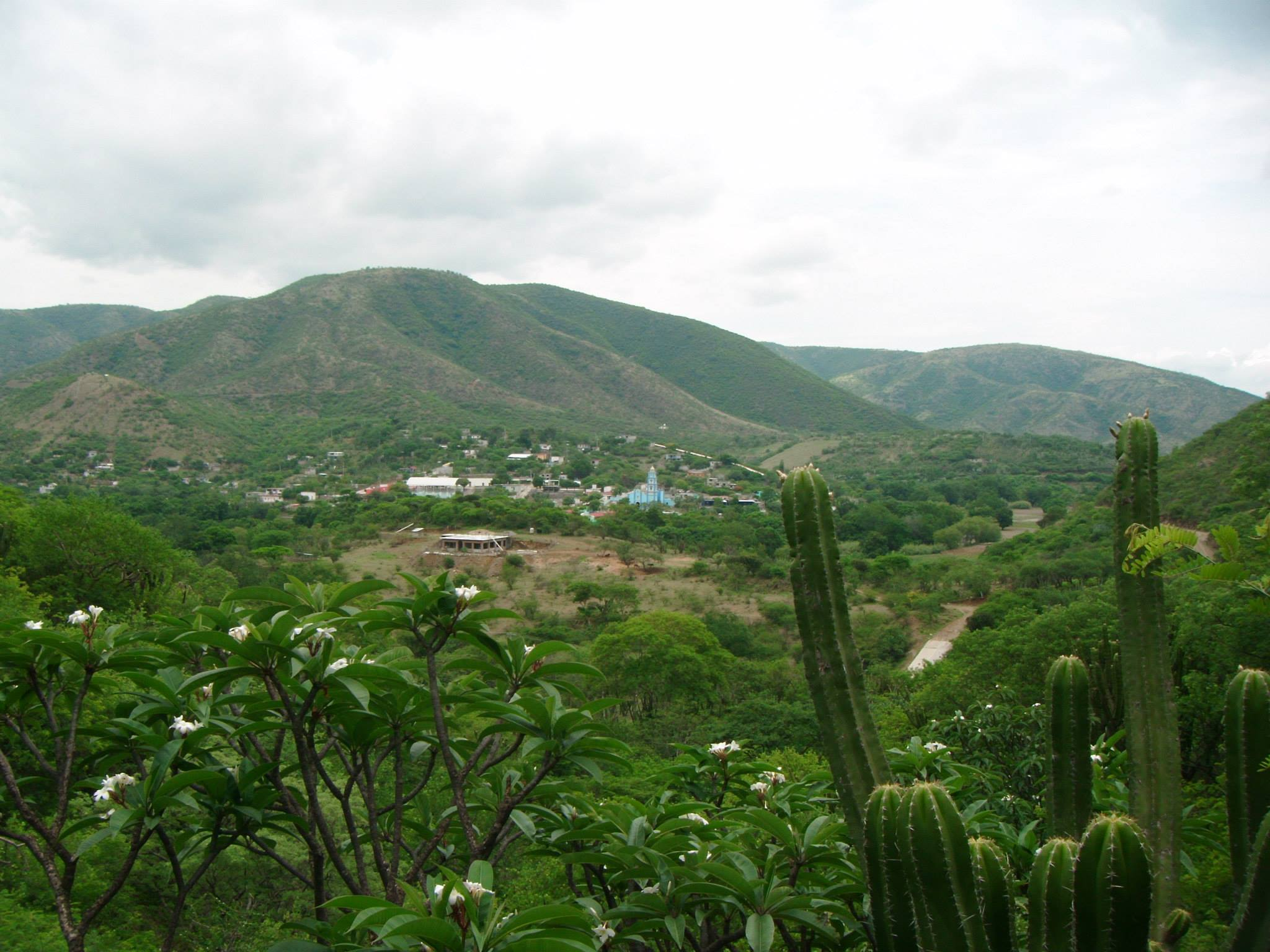
Panoramic view of the center of Xayacatlan de Bravo

Xayacatlán de Bravo is a town and municipality in the Mexican state of Puebla.
