= San Martín Totoltepec =

- Municipality
- Location within Puebla (state) Location within Mexico
- Coordinates: 18°40′N 98°21′W
- Country: Mexico
- State: Puebla
- Time zone: UTC-6 (Zona Centro)
- Website: https://www.sanmartintotoltepec.gob.mx/

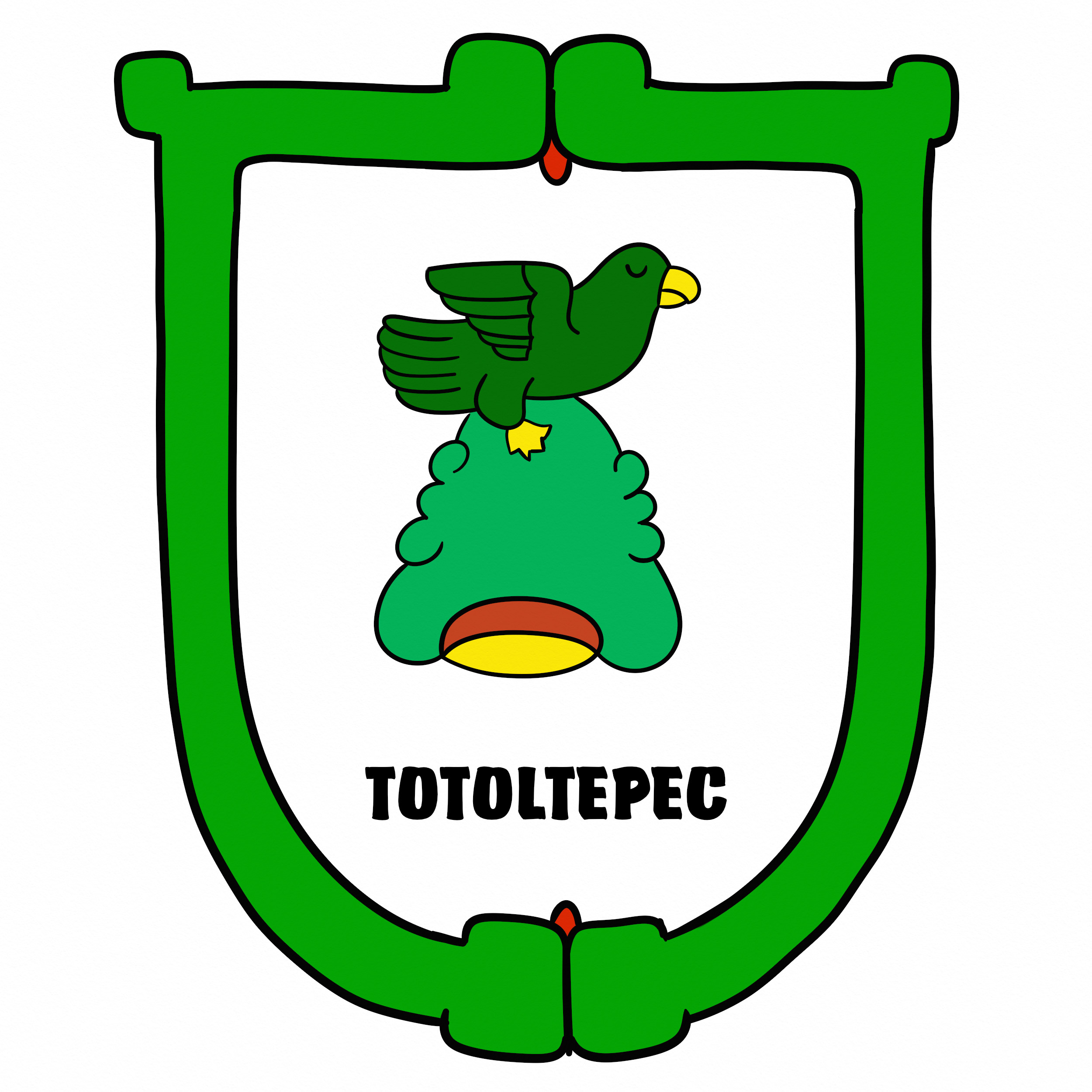
Coat of arms of the Municipality of San Martín Totoltepec

San Martín Totoltepec is a municipality in the Mexican state of Puebla. The municipality covers an area of 7.27 km², making it one of the smallest in the state. It was created on 27 April 1922.

The name "Totoltepec" contains the Nahuatl words tototl (bird or fowl) and tepetl (hill).
