= San Jerónimo Xayacatlán =

- Municipality
- Coat of arms

- Location in Mexico
- Coordinates: 18°13′17″N 97°54′54″W
- Country: Mexico
- State: Puebla
- Time zone: UTC-6 (Zona Centro)

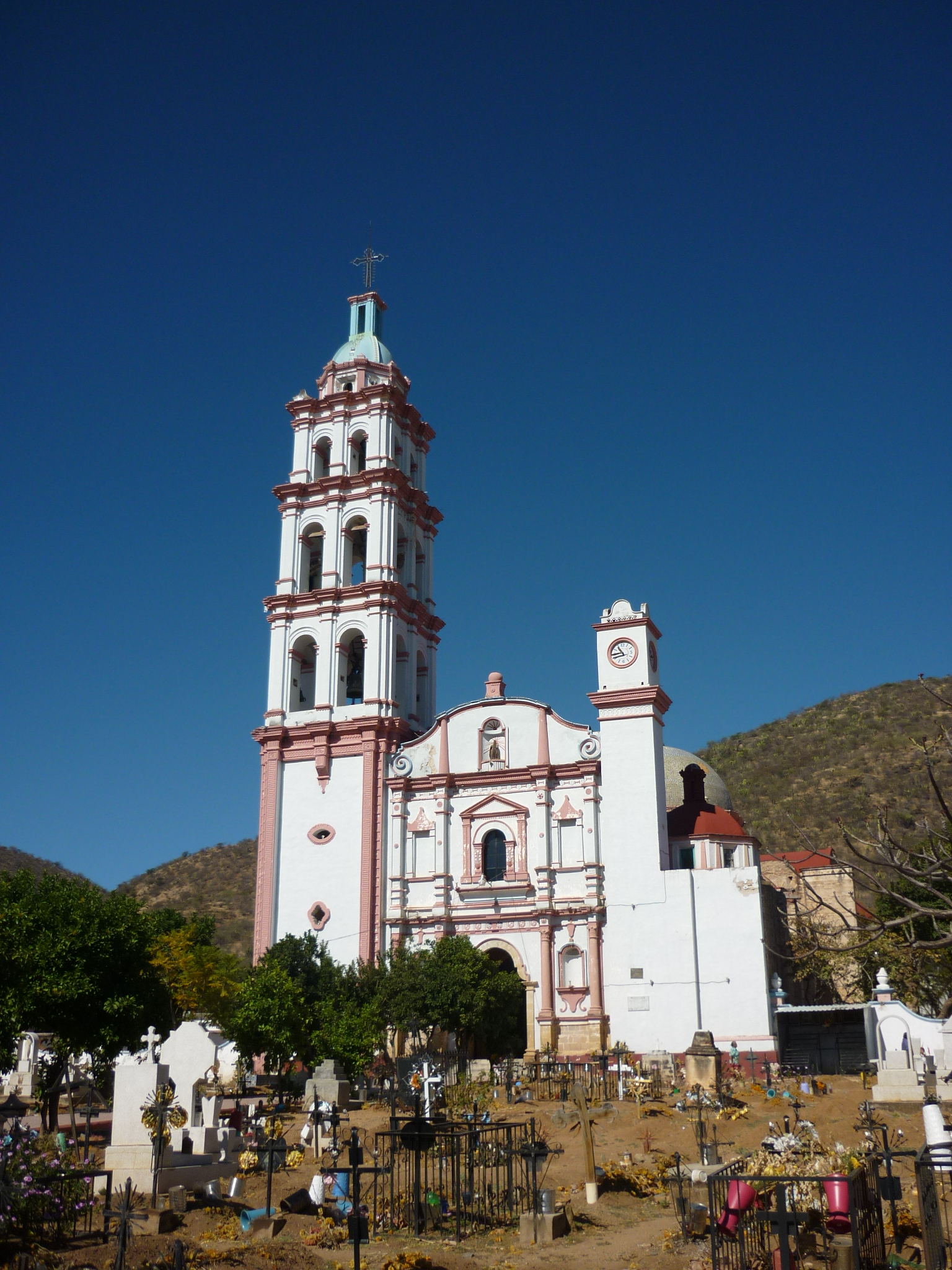
Iglesia de dia

San Jerónimo Xayacatlán is a municipality in the Mexican state of Puebla.
