= Albino Zertuche =

Coordinates: 18.0000°N 98.5000°W

- Municipality
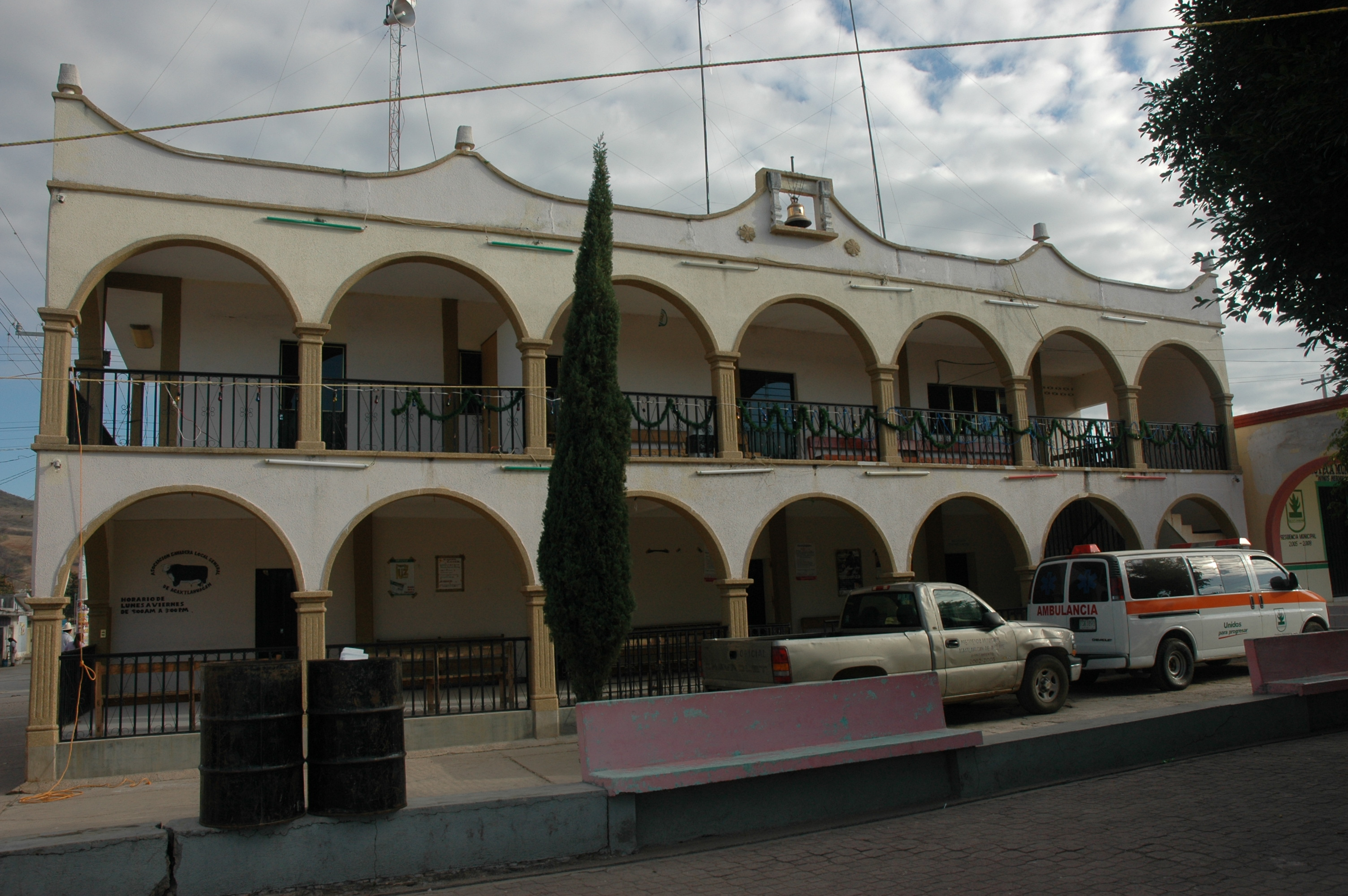

- Coat of arms

- Location of the municipality in Puebla
- Country: Mexico
- State: Puebla
- Time zone: UTC-6 (Zona Centro)

Albino Zertuche is a municipality in the Mexican state of Puebla.

== Etymology ==
Named after Albino Zertuche.
