= 16th federal electoral district of Puebla =

Federal electoral district of Mexico

Puebla's 16th
- Electoral district of the Chamber of Deputies of Mexico

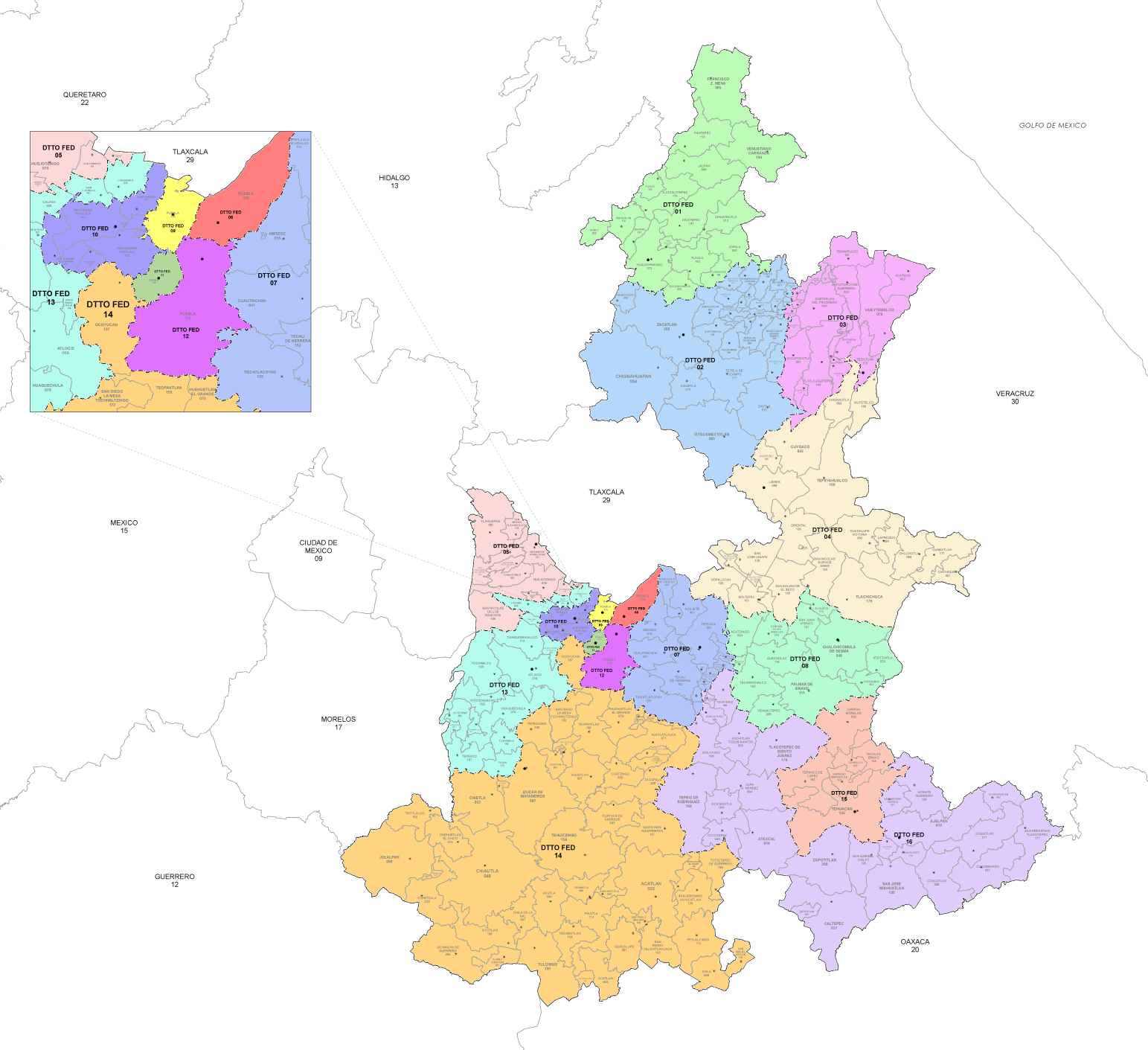
- 16th district since 2023

Incumbent
- Member: Adolfo Alatriste Cantú
- Party: ▌Ecologist Green Party
- Congress: 66th (2024–2027)

District
- State: Puebla
- Head town: Ajalpan
- Coordinates: 18°37′N 97°24′W
- Covers: 25 municipalities: Ajalpan, Altepexi, Atexcal, Caltepec, Coxcatlán, Coyomeapan, Coyotepec, Eloxochitlán, Huitziltepec, Ixcaquixtla, Juan N. Méndez, Molcaxac, San Antonio Cañada, San Gabriel Chilac, San José Miahuatlán, Tepexi de Rodríguez, Tepeyahualco de Cuauhtémoc, Tlacotepec de Benito Juárez, San Sebastián Tlacotepec, Tochtepec, Vicente Guerrero, Xochitlán Todos Santos, Zapotitlán, Zinacatepec, Zoquitlán
- PR region: Fourth
- Precincts: 194
- Population: 417,829 (2020 census)
- Indigenous: Yes (62%)

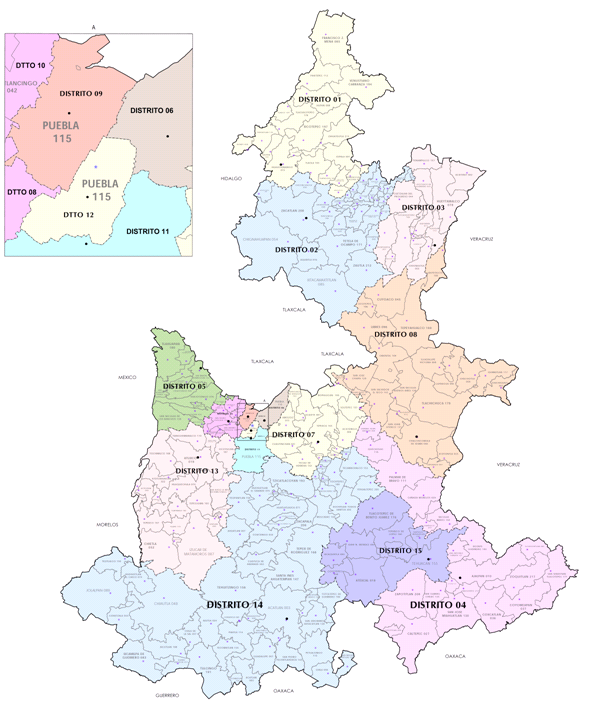
Puebla's districts in 2017–2022

The 16th federal electoral district of Puebla (Spanish: Distrito electoral federal 16 de Puebla) is one of the 300 electoral districts into which Mexico is divided for elections to the federal Chamber of Deputies and one of 16 such districts in the state of Puebla.

It elects one deputy to the lower house of Congress for each three-year legislative session by means of the first-past-the-post system. Votes cast in the district also count towards the calculation of proportional representation ("plurinominal") deputies elected from the fourth region.

Suspended in 1930, (Note: An amendment to Article 52 of the Constitution in 1928 changed the original provision of "one deputy per 60,000 inhabitants" to "one deputy per 100,000"; as a result, the size of the Chamber of Deputies fell from 281 in the 1928 election to 171 in 1934.) Puebla's 16th was re-established by the Federal Electoral Institute (IFE) in 2005. It was suspended again in 2017 but was restored in the 2023 redistricting process.

The current member for the district, elected in the 2024 general election, is Adolfo Alatriste Cantú of the Ecologist Green Party of Mexico (PVEM).

== District territory ==
Under the 2023 districting plan adopted by the National Electoral Institute (INE), which is to be used for the 2024, 2027 and 2030 federal elections, Puebla's congressional seat allocation rose from 15 to 16. The restored 16th district is in Puebla's south-east and covers 194 electoral precincts (secciones electorales) across 25 of the state's municipalities:

- Ajalpan, Altepexi, Atexcal, Caltepec, Coxcatlán, Coyomeapan, Coyotepec, Eloxochitlán, Huitziltepec, Ixcaquixtla, Juan N. Méndez, Molcaxac, San Antonio Cañada, San Gabriel Chilac, San José Miahuatlán, Tepexi de Rodríguez, Tepeyahualco de Cuauhtémoc, Tlacotepec de Benito Juárez, San Sebastián Tlacotepec, Tochtepec, Vicente Guerrero, Xochitlán Todos Santos, Zapotitlán, Zinacatepec and Zoquitlán.

The head town (cabecera distrital), where results from individual polling stations are gathered together and tallied, is the city of Ajalpan. The district reported a population of 417,829 in the 2020 census and, with Indigenous and Afrodescendent inhabitants accounting for over 62% of that total, it is classified by the INE as an indigenous district. (Note: Total inhabitants, not voters. The INE deems any local or federal electoral district where Indigenous or Afrodescendent inhabitants number 40% or more of the population to be an indigenous district.)

== Previous districting schemes ==
Evolution of electoral district numbers
	1974	1978	1996	2005	2017	2023
Puebla	10	14	15	16	15	16
Chamber of Deputies	196	300				

2017–2022

From 2017 to 2022, Puebla was assigned only 15 congressional seats. The 16th district was in abeyance for that period and therefore did not return deputies to Congress in the 2018 or 2021 elections.

2005–2017

Because of changing population dynamics in the 2000 Census, the 16th district was re-established by the Federal Electoral Institute (IFE) in its 2005 districting plan. Its head town was at Ajalpan and it covered 23 municipalities.

== Deputies returned to Congress ==
(Mexico) National parties
- Current
- PAN
- PRI
- PT
- PVEM
- MC
- Morena
- PAZ
- Somos
- Defunct or local only
- PLM
- PNR
- PRM
- PNM
- PP
- PPS
- PARM
- PFCRN
- CON
- PANAL
- PSD
- PES
- PES
- PRD

Puebla's 16th district
Election	Deputy	Party	Term	Legislature
1916	Gilberto de la Fuente		1916–1917	Constituent Congress of Querétaro
...
The 16th district was suspended between 1930 and 2006
2006	Mario Mendoza Cortés (Note: Mendoza Cortés was killed in a traffic accident on 26 September 2007. He was replaced for the remainder of his term by his alternate, López Balbuena.); Guillermina López Balbuena	Institutional Revolutionary Party	2006–2007; 2007–2009	60th Congress
2009	Julieta Octavia Marín Torres	Institutional Revolutionary Party	2009–2012	61st Congress
2012	Lisandro Arístides Campos Córdova	Institutional Revolutionary Party	2012–2015	62nd Congress
2015	Edith Villa Trujillo	Institutional Revolutionary Party	2015–2018	63rd Congress
The 16th district was suspended between 2018 and 2024
2024	Adolfo Alatriste Cantú	National Regeneration Movement	2024–2027	66th Congress

== Presidential elections ==
Puebla's 16th district
Election	District won by	Party or coalition	%
2018	District suspended		
2024	Claudia Sheinbaum Pardo	Sigamos Haciendo Historia	69.9383
