= Xochitlán Todos Santos =

- Municipality and town
- Coat of arms

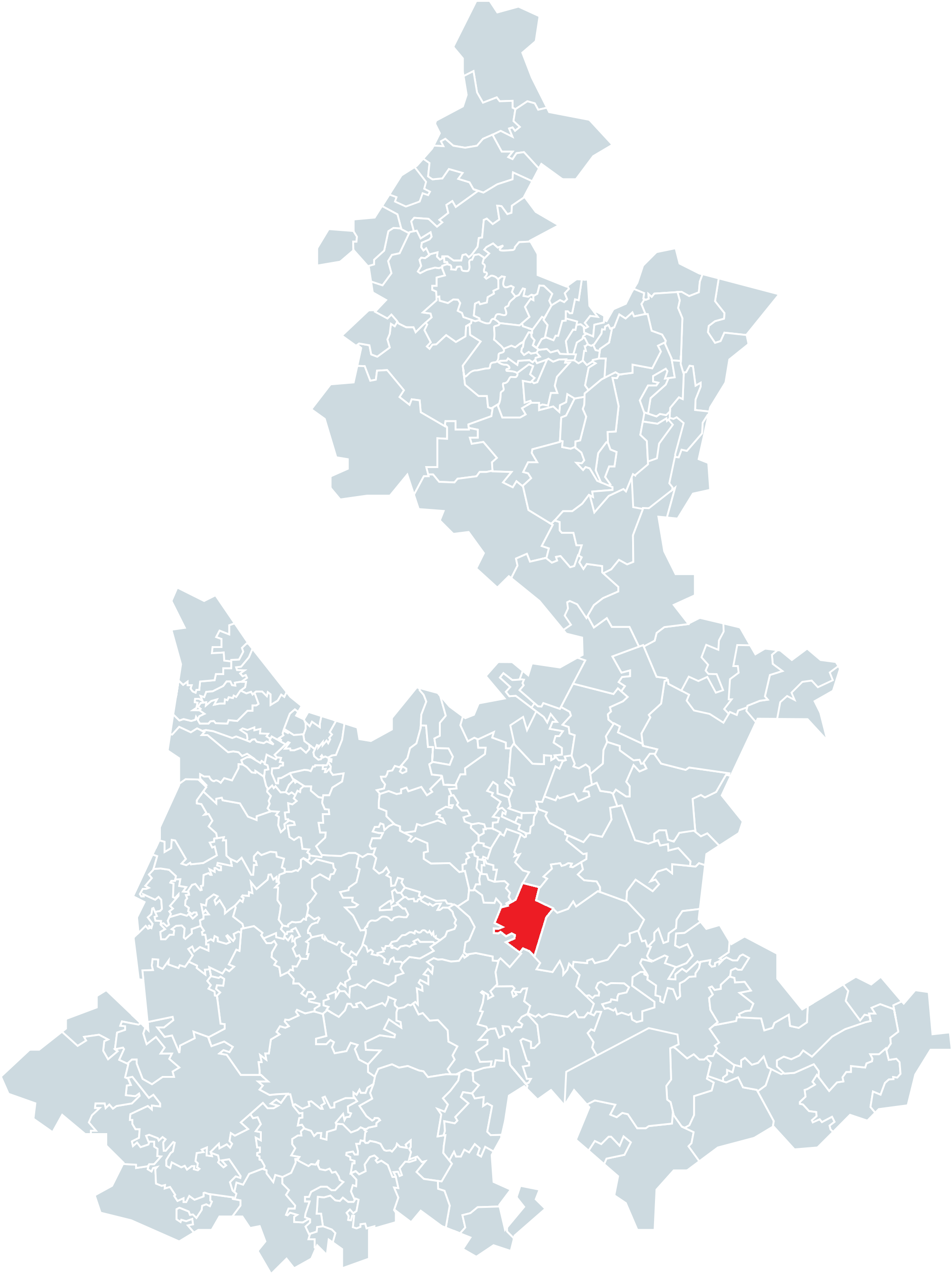
- Location of the municipality in Puebla
- Country: Mexico
- State: Puebla
- First settled: 1895

Government
  - Municipal President: Margarito Bolaños del Rosario

Area
  - Total: 163.72 km^{2} (63.21 sq mi)
- Elevation: 1,900 m (6,200 ft)

Population (2010)
  - Total: 6,049
  - Density: 32/km^{2} (83/sq mi)
- Time zone: UTC-6 (Zona Centro)

Xochitlán Todos Santos is a town and one of the 217 municipalities of the Mexican state of Puebla. It was founded in 1895.

== Name ==
Xochitlán, name composed of the Nahua words, "xochitl", flower, and "tlan", together. The full name means "among the flowers".

== Demography ==
According to the last census by INEGI in 2010, the municipality has a total population of 6,049 inhabitants, which gives it an approximate population density of 37 inhabitants per square kilometer.

== Economy ==
The primary industry is agriculture, since the inhabitants dedicate themselves mostly to the sowing of corn, beans, alfalfa and sorghum. In second place we find livestock, a greater number of ranchers are dedicated to raising cattle or cattle and pigs. Unlike a minority that is dedicated to raising sheep, goats, horses, poultry and beekeeping.

== History ==
Xochitlán Todos Santos was founded by Olmeca-Xicallanca groups that settled there in pre-Hispanic times, dominated by Tepeaca, a tributary of Mexico. It belonged to the old district of Tecamachalco and in 1895 a free municipality was established. There is a parish dedicated to the Virgin of the Assumption dated from the 17th century. Located here is the Chapel of the Hacienda de San Jerónimo Álfaro founded by the Jesuits dedicated to Santa Rosalía. At the main entrance there is an underground tunnel to Tecamachalco, which was last used during the Mexican Revolution.

== Geography ==
The municipality is located roughly 1.9 km (1.2 mi) above sea level and covers an area of 163.72 km^{2} (63.21 sq mi). To the north, it borders the municipalities of Tochtepec and Tecamachalco, to the west is Huitziltepec and Molcaxac, to the south are the municipalities of Juan N. Mendez and Tepexi de Rodríguez, and to the east are Yehualtepec and the municipality of Tlacotepec de Benito Juárez.

Xochitlán is connected by 3 highways: Xochitlán-Tecamachalco, Xochitlán-Tlacoptec de Benito Juárez and Xochitlán-Dolores Hidalgo. As for collective transportation, the municipality has Route 19 bound for Tlacotepec and Tecamachalco.

=== Climate ===
The climate is temperate sub-humid with rains in the summer; with average annual temperature between 12 and 18 °C (54 and 64 °F), precipitation of the driest month being less than 40 millimetres (1.6 in); percentage of winter precipitation with respect to the annual is less than 5. Temperature of the coldest month falls between −3 and 18 °C (27 and 64 °F).

=== Hydrography ===
The municipality is traversed by a series of irrigation canals that cross it in a northeast–southeast direction, through the south lateral canal. These are used for agriculture. They are administered by the "Emiliano Zapata" irrigation module, their main task is to verify that the farmers comply with the quotas to be able to use the necessary water for their crops, as well as the periodic maintenance of the canals. The streams bathe the municipality and have served to establish small boards (Jagüeyes) among them are located in the region: "Jagüey Chiquito", "Jagüey El Arroyo", "Jagüey Los Santiagos", "Jagüey Plan Juárez" and "Jagüey Los Moros". ". For the supply of drinking water, the municipality has its own wells, as well as the "Cuesta del Toro" dam.
