= Tropical Storm Arlene (2011) =

Atlantic tropical storm in 2011

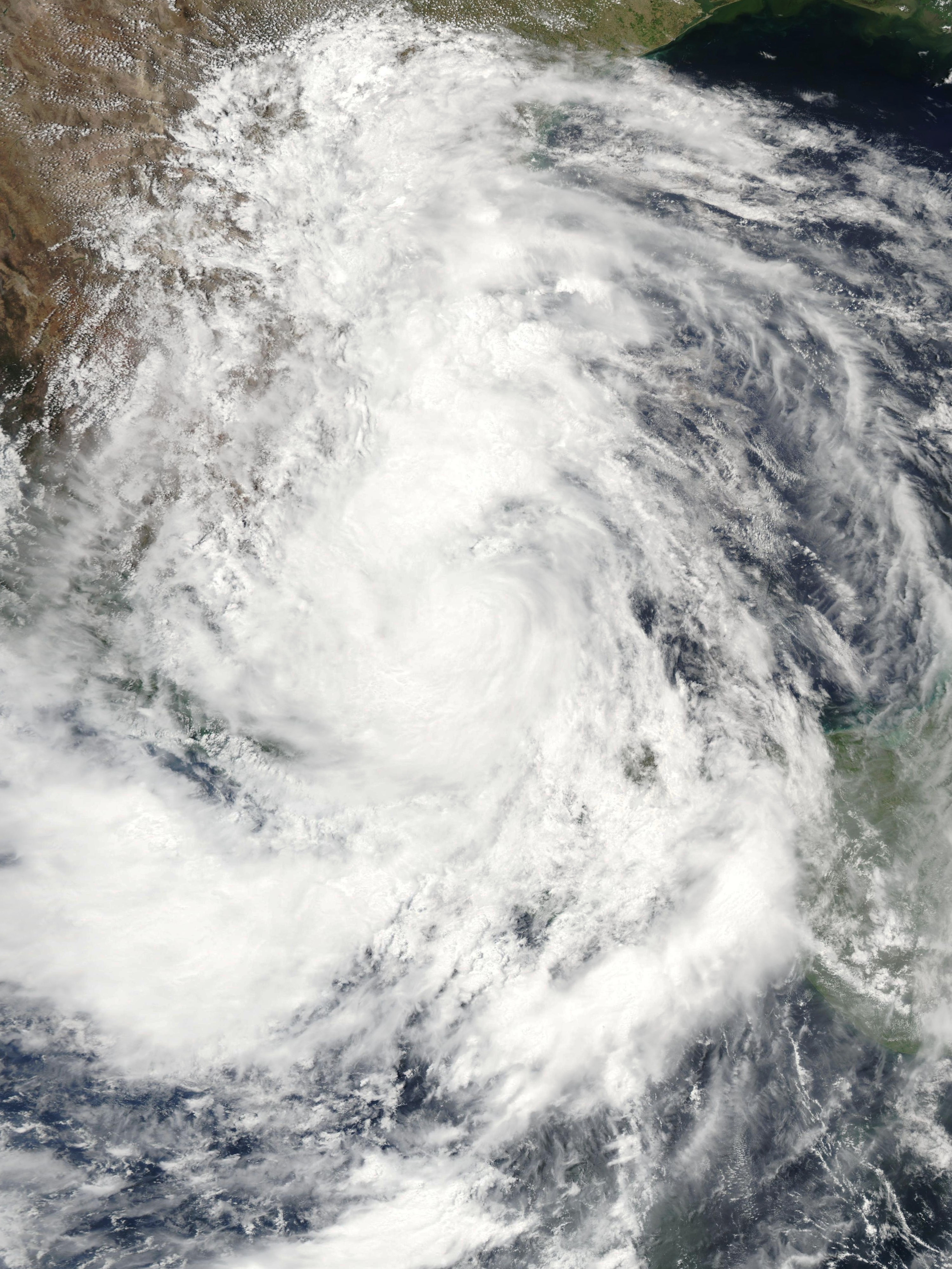
- Tropical Storm Arlene shortly after making landfall in Mexico on June 30

Meteorological history
- Formed: June 28, 2011
- Dissipated: July 1, 2011

Tropical storm
- 1-minute sustained (SSHWS/NWS)
- Highest winds: 65 mph (100 km/h)
- Lowest pressure: 993 mbar (hPa); 29.32 inHg

Overall effects
- Fatalities: 18 direct, 4 indirect (22 total)
- Damage: $223 million (2011 USD)
- Areas affected: Central America, Mexico, Texas, Florida
- IBTrACS
- Part of the 2011 Atlantic hurricane season

Tropical Storm Arlene brought blustery conditions to much of eastern Mexico in late June to early July 2011. The first named storm and first tropical cyclone of the 2011 Atlantic hurricane season. Arlene originated from an Atlantic tropical wave, which crossed the Yucatán Peninsula before emerging over warm waters in the Bay of Campeche. Despite moderate wind shear, the disturbance strengthened and developed a surface circulation, prompting the National Hurricane Center to declare it a tropical storm on June 28. Arlene remained vigorous for most of its existence; the storm peaked in intensity with winds of 65 mph (100 km/h) on June 30, just before making landfall on the coast of Veracruz. Crossing the mountains of eastern Mexico, Arlene weakened to a depression before dissipating early on July 1.

The precursor disturbance to Arlene brought significant rainfall to parts of Central America, killing three people and triggering widespread flooding and landslides. Throughout Mexico, prolonged rains from Arlene and subsequent flooding affected hundreds of homes and several roads, causing many residents to seek shelter. At the height of the storm, power was lost to 285,000 homes. At least 22 people in Mexico were killed by Arlene. Elsewhere, rainfall from the storm alleviated ongoing drought conditions in southern Texas and Florida.

== Meteorological history ==
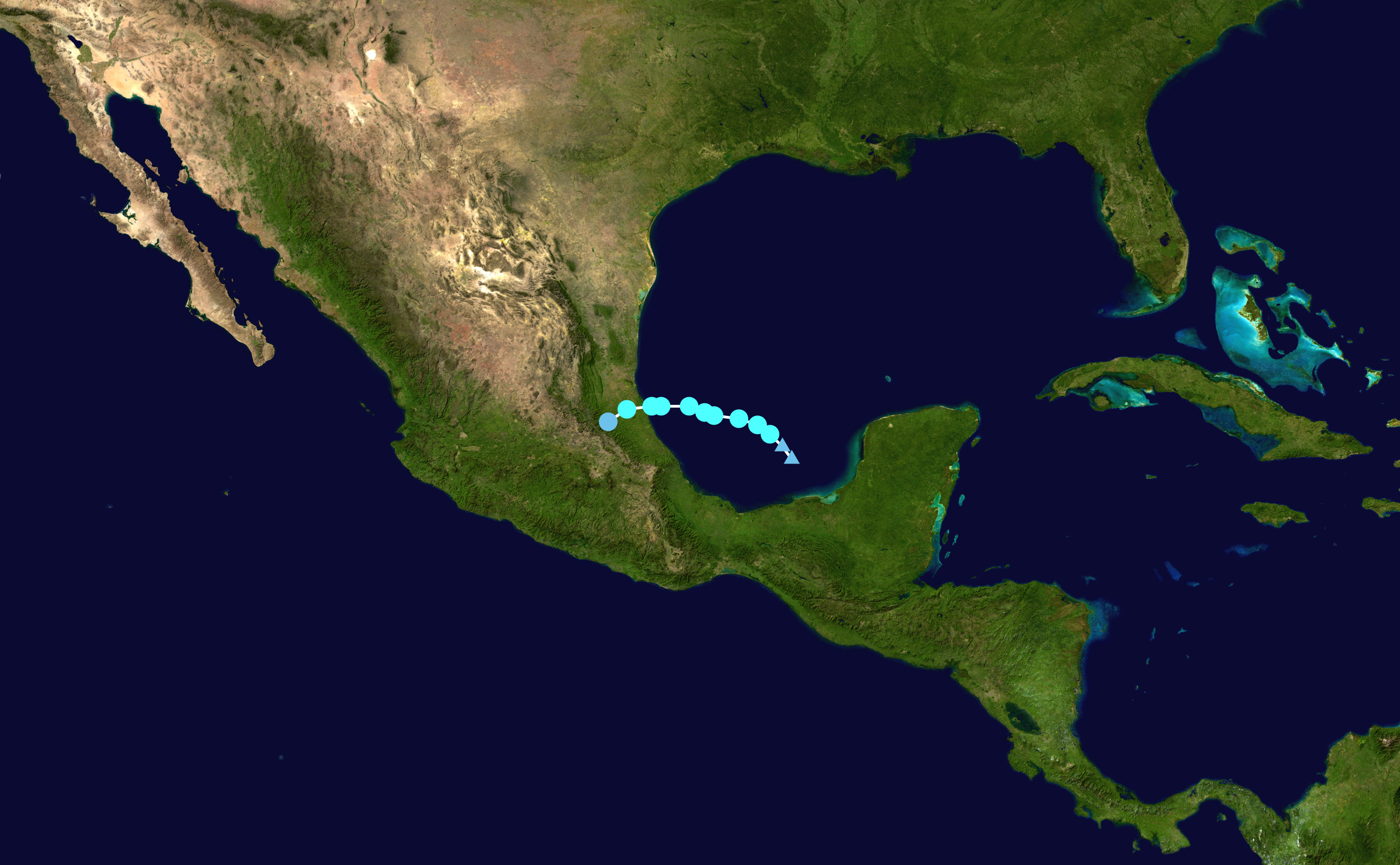
Map plotting the storm's track and intensity, according to the Saffir–Simpson scale Map key Saffir–Simpson scale Tropical depression (≤38 mph, ≤62 km/h) Tropical storm (39–73 mph, 63–118 km/h) Category 1 (74–95 mph, 119–153 km/h) Category 2 (96–110 mph, 154–177 km/h) Category 3 (111–129 mph, 178–208 km/h) Category 4 (130–156 mph, 209–251 km/h) Category 5 (≥157 mph, ≥252 km/h) Unknown Storm type Tropical cyclone Subtropical cyclone Extratropical cyclone, remnant low, tropical disturbance, or monsoon depression

The origins of Tropical Storm Arlene can be traced to a distinct tropical wave, embedded within an area of deep atmospheric moisture, that emerged off the coast of Africa on June 13, 2011. The wave tracked westward across the Atlantic for several days, reaching the western Caribbean Sea in late June. By June 24, it began interacting with the extension of a monsoon trough in the region, generating broad cyclonic flow and scattered convection in conjunction with an upper trough to its northwest. The amplified wave slowly proceeded west-northwestward along Central America, bringing heavy rainfall to the area. Initially, the disturbance's development was impeded by the trough aloft and adjacent land, though the National Hurricane Center (NHC) noted favorable conditions for tropical cyclogenesis over the Bay of Campeche, coupled with abating wind shear. On June 26, the disturbance moved inland over the Yucatán Peninsula, emerging into the bay the next day as it produced a surface low. Despite moderate shear, a Hurricane Hunters flight into the system revealed that a closed wind circulation had formed at sea level. Thunderstorm activity became more concentrated, and the NHC initiated advisories on Tropical Storm Arlene at midnight June 29, after the cyclone's surface winds increased to 40 mph (65 km/h) about 280 mi (450 km) south-southeast of Tampico, Tamaulipas.

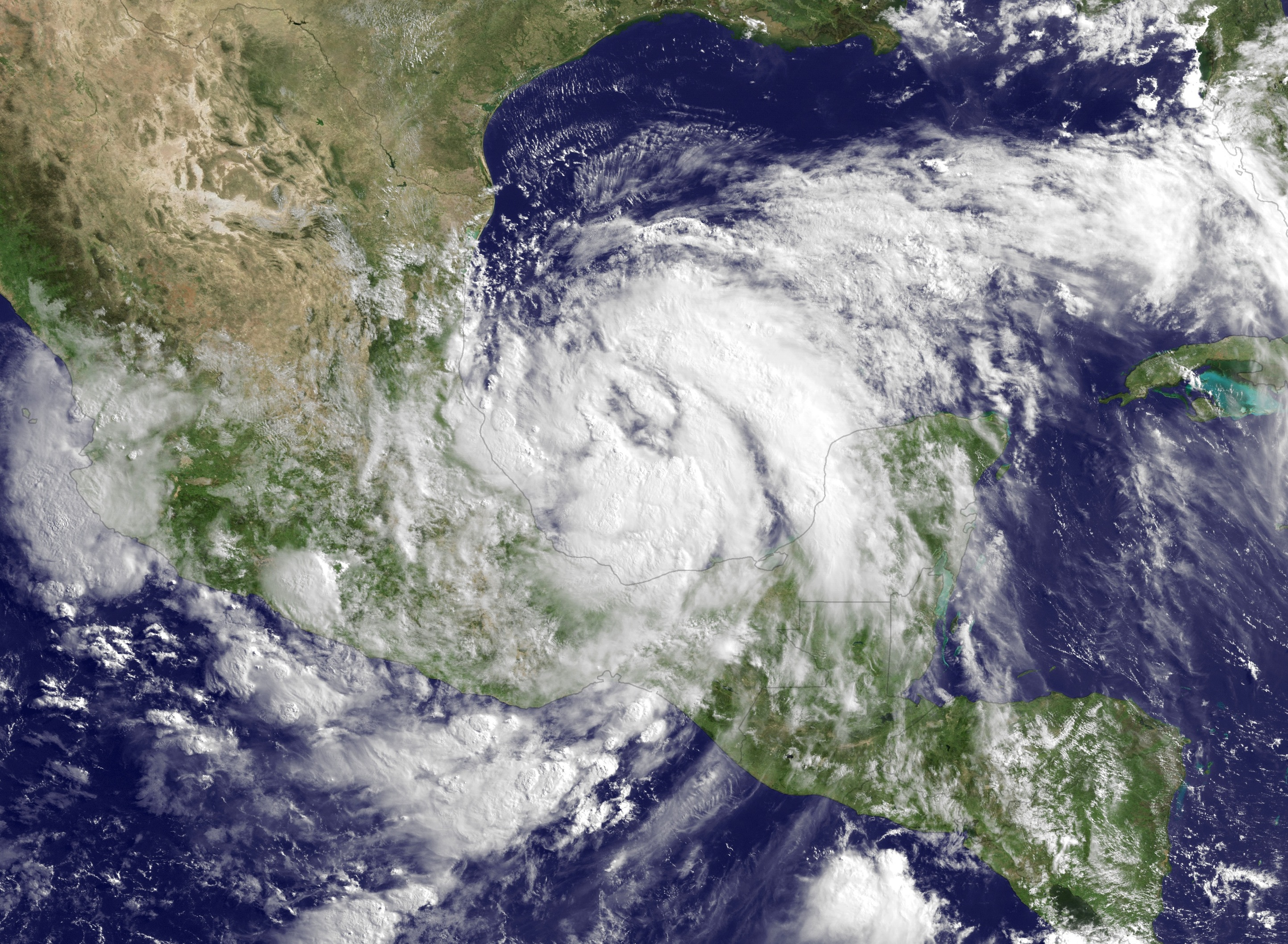
Tropical Storm Arlene organizing over the Bay of Campeche

Over the following hours, deep convection increased around the broad storm, though its circulation center continued to lack in organization. Arlene curved to the west in response to a ridge of high pressure to its north and northwest. As the shear over the region further decreased, the large storm began to strengthen gradually, developing spiral convective bands closer to its center. Although forecast models supported intensification to hurricane status, significant development was compromised by a lack of distinguishable central features. On June 30, just before Arlene made landfall, Dvorak satellite estimates indicated the storm had reached a peak intensity of 65 mph (100 km/h) while accelerating off the coast of Veracruz. Arlene moved ashore near Cabo Rojo as a strong tropical storm by 09:00 UTC, with the severest winds confined to the north of the center.

Farther inland, Arlene turned to the west-southwest along the building ridge. The storm decreased in strength upon doing so; its mid- and low-level circulations became increasingly decoupled, with the latter turning elongated and ill-defined. Early on July 1, the NHC downgraded Arlene to a tropical depression, and the cyclone dissipated over the high terrain of the Sierra Madre Mountains shortly thereafter. Arlene's remnants continued to produce heavy precipitation over central Mexico, and with high air pressures offshore a tight pressure gradient generated a strong easterly breeze along the country's Pacific coastlines.

== Preparations ==
Due to the threat of heavy rainfall from Arlene's precursor, authorities issued a green alert in Honduras for 13 departments on the afternoon of June 24, which remained in effect for 72 hours. In El Salvador, the departments of La Unión, Ahuachapán, and Sonsonate were put under green alerts on June 26 after rains persisted over the region. Across the Yucatán Peninsula, officials and emergency workers braced for heavy rains as the system developed. Marine and fishing operations were suspended, while schools in Benito Juárez were closed on June 28.

In response to Arlene's formation, the government of Mexico issued a tropical storm warning for coastal areas from Barra de Nautla northward to Bahia Algodones on June 29. Later that day, a hurricane watch was put into effect for the area extending from Tuxpan to La Cruz, after the storm showed signs of strengthening. They were both extended shortly after, with the watch then reaching to Barra de Nautla and the warning further southward to Palma Sola, though the latter was simultaneously discontinued for areas to the north of La Pesca. Prior to landfall, the Mexican Social Security Institute (IMSS) activated a contingency plan for risk zones in the states of Veracruz and Tamaulipas. Emergency crews and medical teams were subsequently dispatched to the area in order to supply medical care to possible victims and manage power plant water pumps in case of flooding. An alert was declared for Pemex—a major oil company within the storm's projected path—in consideration of possible impact to refineries and other facilities.

Over 50 temporary shelters were made available in flood-prone areas across various municipalities in Veracruz. Authorities in Tamaulipas prepared five shelters and mobilized of 10 emergency teams to evacuate up to 20,000 people in anticipation of adverse weather conditions. In Hidalgo, 250 shelters were opened and emergency workers were dispatched as a safety measure. At the risk of flash flooding, public storm shelters were made available in parts of Oaxaca.

== Impact ==
=== Central America ===
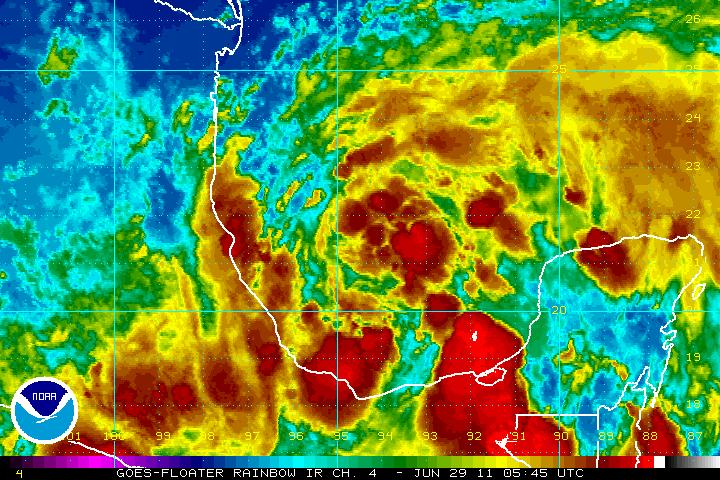
Tropical Storm Arlene intensifying with thunderstorms dropping heavy rain in Central America and Mexico as seen on infrared imagery

For several days, the precursor disturbance to Arlene dropped significant amounts of rain along coastal Central America and the Yucatán Peninsula. In Honduras, floods killed one person and collapsed a major bridge near the Goascorán River, leaving about 600 families isolated from surrounding areas. Elsewhere in the country, a rockslide occurred along a road to San José de Colinas, and several rivers overflowed due to the effects of the storm. In neighboring El Salvador, maximum rainfall amounts totaled 8.34 in (212 mm). Two people drowned in San Miguel, while 25 others were displaced in La Unión due to the floods. Scattered moderate showers also affected several parts of Nicaragua, triggering mudslides and overflowing a river in Cuapa. Along the riverside, 30 homes suffered inundations and 94 people evacuated the area.

=== Mexico ===
Tropical Storm Arlene and its remnants produced hours of prolonged rainfall over much of northeastern and south-central Mexico. Widespread floods and landslides impacted multiple states, prompting evacuations and causing copious damage to property and infrastructure. At the height of the storm, about 285,000 households lost power throughout Mexico, though service was quickly restored to 210,000 homes. Schools remained closed in the morning throughout Hidalgo, as well as in parts of San Luis Potosí, Guerrero, Puebla, and Oaxaca. Throughout the country, Arlene resulted in 22 confirmed fatalities and left one person missing.

==== La Huasteca Region ====
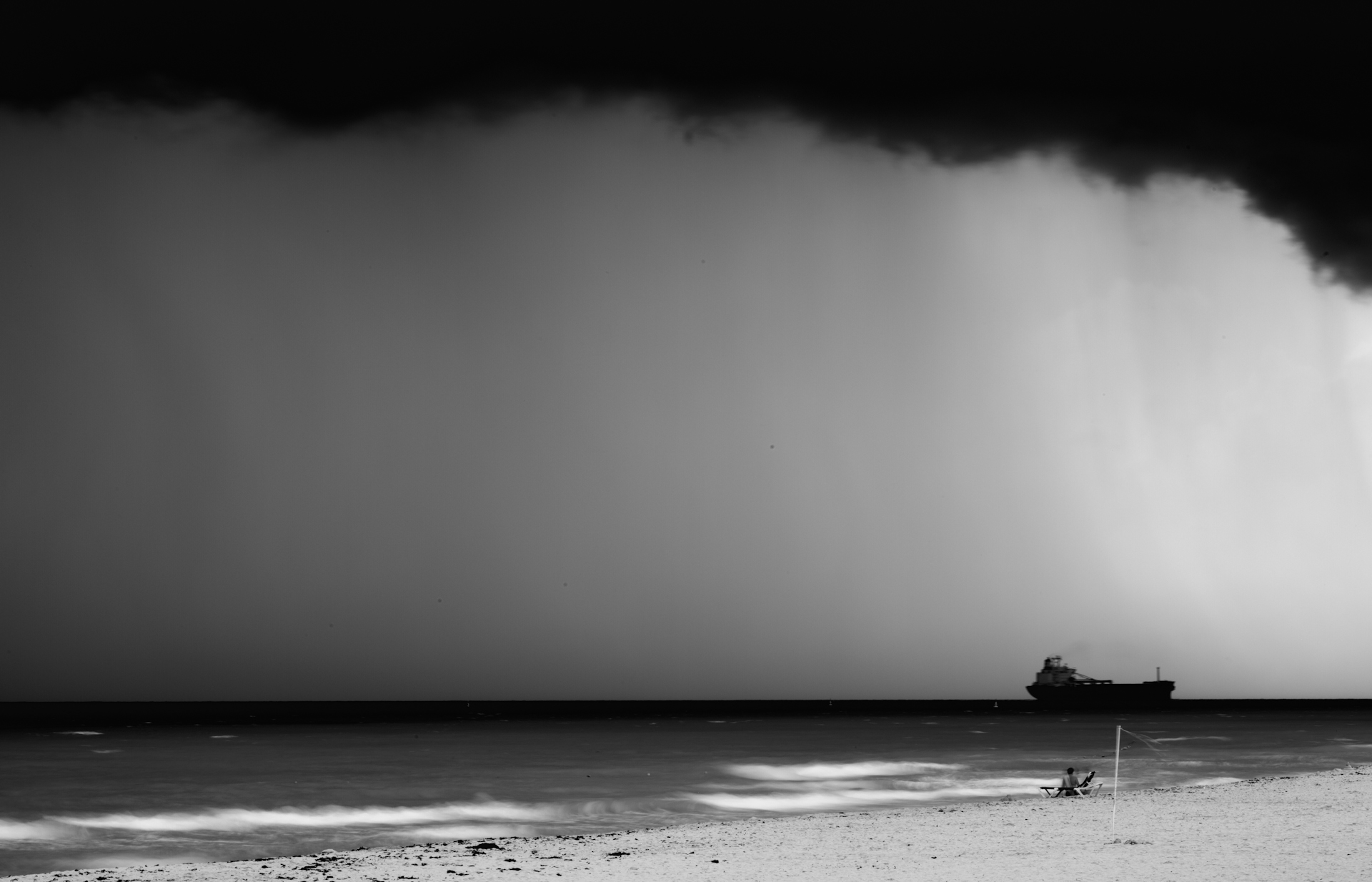
Overcast conditions created by Arlene on moving ashore

Arlene brought strong thunderstorms and showers to much of eastern Mexico, with gale-force winds along adjacent coastlines. Upon landfall in Veracruz, Arlene produced wind speeds to 60 mph (100 km/h) and up to 9.11 in (231.5 mm) of rainfall. The winds and rain uprooted trees and caused extensive flooding, prompting at least 1,786 people throughout the state to evacuate their homes. A total of 67 landslides took place in the state; one such landslide collapsed two houses in Tlalnelhuayocan, killing one inhabitant and injuring 10 others. Mudslides and rockfall also uprooted trees and damaged eight cars in Banerilla, though no injuries were linked to the incident. In Tihuatlán, a rescue worker was killed during the passage of the storm. Overall, Arlene affected 3,358 residences across 50 municipalities in Veracruz; about 2,000 homes were damaged in El Higo. Continued downpours brought on the overflow of 28 rivers, as well as the isolation of 116 communities statewide. Other effects in Veracruz included considerable infrastructural failure, localized land subsidence, and three damaged schools in Coacoatzintla. The costs of road reconstructions totaled Mex$126 million (US$10.2 million). In response to the devastation, the government declared a state of emergency for 65 percent of the state; by July 5, 62 municipalities remained under alert.

Heavy rains fell over Taumalipas, with 348.8 mm measured along the Tamesí River. Widespread flooding forced some 400 families to evacuate throughout the state; 70 trapped families in El Mante had to be rescued from their flooded homes. At the height of the storm, high-voltage electrocutions due to downed power lines caused two deaths in the municipalities of Tampico and Reynosa while critically injuring two workers in Matamoros. By July 4, two more deaths were reported in the state, though their causes remain unspecified. Approximately 40,000 residents suffered property damage to their homes. A state of emergency was declared in the municipalities of Tampico, Ciudad Madero, Altamira, and González in light of the damage. Broken drains and sewers in the storm's wake increased the risk of cholera through contaminated water. Damage estimates in Tamaulipas exceeded Mex$67 million (US$5.8 million). In neighboring San Luis Potosí, Arlene dropped 12.18 in (309.4 mm) of rain and claimed the lives of five people, two due to drownings. Landslides left dozens of communities isolated, and more than 600 residents fled from flooded areas, particularly in Ciudad Valles, Tamazunchale, El Naranjo, and Xilitla.

Farther inland, in Hidalgo, about 100 families required evacuation across the municipalities of Tlanchinol and Orizatlán due to heavy rain, with 7.09 in (180.1 mm) recorded in the latter. The rainfall triggered more than 80 landslides statewide, and two were killed in a rockslide near the town of Jacala. Swollen rivers in El Arenal and Huejutla caused two drownings. Total damage from Arlene reached Mex$2.6 billion (US$207.4 million) across Hidalgo. In response, the state government allocated a total Mex$17 million (US$1.45 million) for rehabilitation works. Downpours in the state of Puebla triggered landslides that cut off roads to traffic. Toppled trees struck a home in the municipality of Zihuateutla, killing its inhabitant. In Tlacotepec municipality, a girl was left missing after falling into a rushing stream; by July 4, officials confirmed she had drowned. After hours of prolonged rainfall, concerns arose over the potential overflow of a dam in the municipality of Tlatlauquitepec. Three houses sustained damage in Eloxochitlán as a consequence of excessively saturated soils, and another collapsed in Atempan. Elsewhere in Puebla, mud and flood waters reached 1.6 ft (0.5 m) in a school after a nearby river overflowed.

==== Elsewhere ====
Upon moving ashore near Quintana Roo, the system spread cloudiness and precipitation across much of the Yucatán Peninsula, resulting in widespread flooding. In southern Mexico, Chiapas received rainfall amounts of 9.3 in (237 mm) in Tapachula and Soconusco over a 36-hour time span. Floods, landslides, and strong winds damaged more than 450 homes in the state. Emergency workers evacuated about 150 families after two rivers in the region reached dangerous water levels. In the wake of Arlene, one fatality was confirmed in Chiapas. Rainfall in Oaxaca inflicted damage to multiple roads and collapsed one bridge; communication was lost with over 12,000 people from Mixe–Zapotec communities. The storm's remnants caused a landslide that overturned a taxi, killing one of its nine passengers. Weather conditions in Michoacán—which was still recovering from the impact of Pacific Hurricane Beatriz—deteriorated significantly; 1,600 homes sustained additional damage, while damaged roads and bridges secluded multiple coastal communities in Aquila. In Guerrero, three people were killed in traffic accidents due to inclement weather. Torrential rainfall throughout the state flooded 210 homes and left one person missing, with some uprooted trees and rockfall occurring along mountainous areas.

=== United States ===
In Florida, moisture tracing behind Arlene produced showers, alleviating ongoing extreme drought conditions in the state. The National Weather Service warned for the potential of flooding rains in the drought-stricken region of southern Texas. Officials in Cameron County ordered the preparation of sandbags, as well as the inspection of water pumps and vehicles to deal with floodwaters. In Hidalgo County, the storm spawned a weak tornado that damaged roofs, toppled vehicles, and injured one person prior to moving into Mexico.

== See also ==
- Other storms of the same name
- Tropical Storm Bret (2005)
- Tropical Storm Gert (2005)
- Tropical Storm Jose (2005)
- Hurricane Stan (2005)
- Hurricane Karl (2010)
