= Coxcatlán =

Coxcatlán or Coxcatlan may refer to:

- Coxcatlan Cave, an archaeological site in Puebla, Mexico
- Coxcatlán Municipality, Puebla
- Coxcatlán Municipality, San Luis Potosí
- Coxcatlán, Buenavista de Cuéllar
- Coxcatlán, Puebla

== See also ==
- Coxcatlán Municipality (disambiguation)
