= Coxcatlán Municipality =

Coxcatlán Municipality may refer to:

- Coxcatlán Municipality, Puebla
- Coxcatlán Municipality, San Luis Potosí

== See also ==
- Coxcatlán (disambiguation)
