= Contemporary dance in Mexico =

Contemporary Dance in Mexico began to develop by the end of the 20th century as a result of a mixture of different dance movements around the country, largely influenced to recapture nationalism in art, in addition to the manifestation of expressionism. In the 1950s, the work of both national and international dancers began to drive the development of traditional forms of dance in the country. This initiated a constant search for the use of diverse spaces such as forums and venues to shape a dance culture in Mexico. Various scenic proposals began to emerge, including opera, the cancán, eccentric dances, Mexican dances, variety shows, and so on.

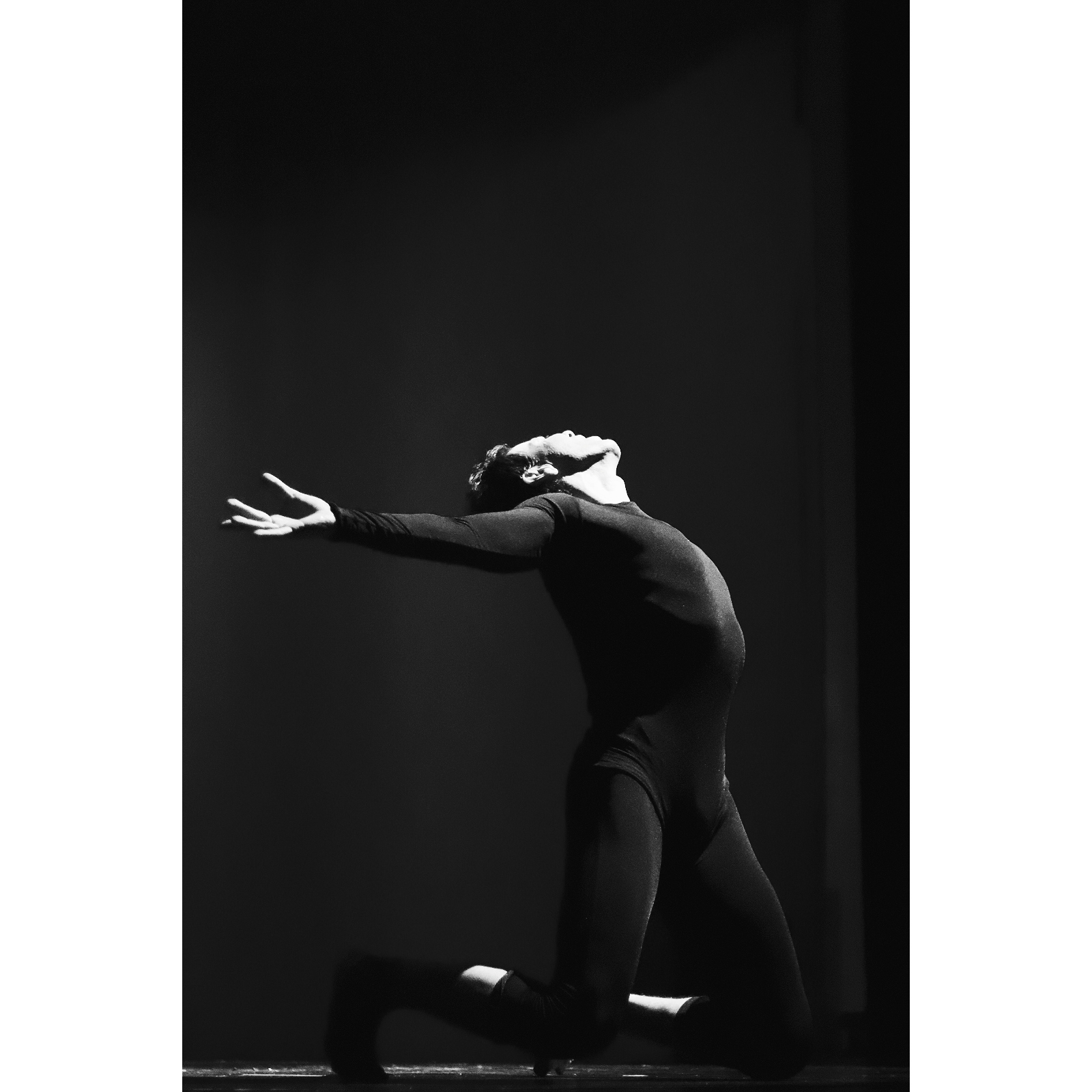
Contemporary dance solo "Extracto de la Traviata" performed and created by Mexican dancer and choreographer Jesus Tussi at the "Festival 2019" of the academy "Danza del Sol Mexico" in Santiago de Querétaro.

== Background ==
At the beginning of the 20th century, a cultural movement with modernist tendencies emerged, characterized by a constant quest for the recovery of Mexican nationalism, which was reflected after the revolution. Dance was seen as a way of expression to reclaim pre-Hispanic customs. In 1921, at the building of the Secretariat of Public Education (SEP) many dance performances with themes alluding to nationalism started being organized. Additionally, the facility was used as a classroom venue where classical dance techniques would be taught.

This was a project developed by José Vasconcelos to increase the dissemination of artistic activities, giving major importance to dance as a discipline.

In 1960, expressive movements began to expand in the United States, where young people opened up new horizons in dance; stages were no longer confined to theaters, but could also be found in the streets, museums, rooftops, parks, etc. This American movement influenced directly Mexican performers and choreographers who began to search for new forms of expression that were focused on the feelings of individuals as participants in a changing society.

== Development ==
The trend began to develop in 1960, but its full incorporation began in the ‘80s. During the six-year term of José López Portillo (1976–1982), a great financial abundance backed by oil resources was speculated, which was a great step toward greater access to culture and art for the middle class. It was during this period that institutions were created to disseminate the discipline, furthermore, spaces of creation and festivals that dancers could use opened. Among the institutions that joined the diffusion of dance are the following: The National Institute of Fine Arts and Literature (Instituto Nacional de Bellas Artes y Literatura, INBAL) National Autonomous University of Mexico (Universidad Nacional Autónoma de México, UNAM) Metropolitan Autonomous University (Universidad Autónoma Metropolitana, UAM) National Polytechnic Institute (Instituto Politécnico Nacional, IPN), National Fund for Social Activities (Fondo Nacional para Actividades Sociales, Fonapas).

From July 19 to August 2, 1981, the First National Dance Festival was held to encourage the teaching and learning of dance techniques in Mexico. In addition to decentralizing the knowledge of the capital in order to take it to other regions of the country.

== Characteristics ==
The main characteristics of the Contemporary dance in Mexico are directly related to the movement that took place internationally. The confluence of different arts is a fundamental part within the creation of choreographies; dance is dramatized, meaning that in theater is used as a resource to include characterization along with body movements.

The entry of new techniques and pedagogical proposals in the field of dance allowed a general development of choreographers and dancers that gave way to the general expansion of the trend. This reflects the rupture that occurred with classical ballet.

One of the main purposes was to consider contexts in which any choreography could be developed, since this was a fundamental point for its creation. This would allow performers to get into character.

The entry of the male gender to dance is another characteristic factor, since it broke with stereotypes about the occupation that men could have in the labor or sports field.

== Dance companies ==
Approximately 32 dance companies are recognized in Mexico. However, they have been increasing over time. These are some of the most influential in the Mexican dance scene:

=== Aksenti ===
Choreographic company that emerged in 1991 and founded by Duane Cochran, it was formed after winning the XII National Contemporary Dance Award. It obtained recognition after the performance of Lazos, a choreography created by the director. In 1993, they toured Brazil.

=== Antares ===
Antares Danza Contemporánea, an independent company based in Hermosillo, Sonora, has dedicated 30 years to the passions and the animality of the human soul, to transfer its findings to the stage, under the guidance of its director and founder Miguel Mancillas.

=== Ballet Independiente ===
It was created in 1966 by Raúl Flores Canelo and other dancers. The company was subsidized by the INBAL and national and international choreographers were in charge of teaching. They toured around the Mexican Republic. The company's director, Magnolia Flores, decided to close it in 2018.

=== Ballet Nacional de México ===
Founded in 1948 under the direction of Guillermina Bravo, it was created with the intention of training choreographers and its dance influence had a great weight within the Mexican scene.

=== National Dance Company ===
Although the origins of this company date back to the creation of the Ballet Clásico de México in 1963, nowadays, the CND defines itself as a company that seeks to promote artistic contemporaneity by encouraging the exploration of new dance expressions at the national and international level.

=== Cuerpo Etéreo ===
Company founded in 1997 in Monterrey, Nuevo León, under the artistic and choreographic direction of Jaime Sierra and Brisa Escobedo. The company's work is characterized by a natural impulse to precipitate formal solutions and not to delay excessively in developing, which makes them successful playwrights and choreographers of short pieces, with an appreciable technical mastery.

=== Teoría de Gravedad ===
Founded in 1993 in Monterrey, Mexico by Professors: Ruby Gámez, one of the most important dancing figures of regiomontana dance and the northern region of the country; and Aurora Buensuceso, the current director and distinguished dancer. The company offers performances for conventional, urban or alternative spaces. It has performed at festivals in Mexico, Canada, the United States, Colombia, Cuba, and Italy.

This company has received scholarships and support from the National Endowment for Culture and Arts (Fondo Nacional para la Cultura y las Artes, FONCA) and the Council for the Culture and Arts of Nuevo León (Consejo para la Cultura y las Artes de Nuevo León, CONARTE), just like from the program "México en Escena". It has promoted 15 editions of the Urban dance festival of Nuevo León.

== Bibliography ==
- Monorriel Quiatora (1993) Danza contemporánea en México. México: INBAL
- Dallal Alberto (1986) La Danza en México. México: Instituto de Investigaciones estéticas
