= Ajalpan =

- Town
- Seal

- Location in Mexico Ajalpan (Mexico)
- Country: Mexico
- State: Puebla
- Municipality: Ajalpan

Government
  - Federal electoral district: Puebla's 16th

Population (2020 census)
  - Total: 31,695
- Time zone: UTC-6 (Zona Centro)

Ajalpan is a city in the southeastern part of the Mexican state of Puebla. With a latitude of 18.370003 and a longitude of -97.2499466, Ajalpan lies near the northern border of the adjacent state of Oaxaca, and is the municipal seat of the municipality of Ajalpan, which surrounds it.

This small city lies in the desert valley south east of the city of Tehuacan between Altepexi and Coxcatlan. One of the products commonly associated with Ajalpan are the red clay roofing shingles or tiles known as 'tejas'. For this reason many of the inhabitants jokingly refer to it as "Ajalpan da las tejas" (meaning: Ajalpan makes shingles).

The region around Ajalpan is fairly arid and there are many types of cactus growing round about. The prickly pear (or 'tuna'/'pitajaya' (in Nahuatl: nōchtli )) grows naturally in the area and is harvested by the inhabitants who eat the fruit or use the sweet juice in drinks.

In October 2015, it was the site of the lynching of two pollsters (Spanish: encuestadores), whom townspeople mistook for kidnappers (Spanish: secuestradores) and burned alive.
