= Eloxochitlán =

Eloxochitlán may refer to several places in Mexico:

- Eloxochitlán, Hidalgo
- Eloxochitlán, Puebla
- Eloxochitlán, Oaxaca ("Eloxochitlán de Flores Magón")
