= Guillermina López Balbuena =

Mexican politician

- Born: 25 June 1973 (age 52); Puebla, Mexico
- Occupation: Politician
- Political party: PRI

Guillermina López Balbuena (born 25 June 1973) is a Mexican politician from the Institutional Revolutionary Party (PRI). From 2007 to 2009, during the 60th session of Congress, she represented Puebla's 16th district in the Chamber of Deputies as the alternate of Mario Mendoza Cortés.
