= Julieta Marín Torres =

Mexican politician

- Born: 16 March 1944; Puebla, Mexico
- Died: 22 March 2015 (aged 71)
- Occupation: Politician
- Political party: PRI
- Relatives: Mario Plutarco Marín Torres (brother)

Julieta Octavia Marín Torres (Note: In this Mexican name, the surname is Marín and the second or maternal family name is Torres.) (16 March 1944 – 22 March 2015) was a Mexican politician from the Institutional Revolutionary Party (PRI). She was the sister of Mario Marín Torres, who served as governor of Puebla from 2005 to 2011.

In the 2009 mid-terms she was elected to the Chamber of Deputies to represent Puebla's 16th district during the 61st session of Congress.

Marín Torres died of lung cancer on 22 March 2015 at the age of 71.
