= Ajalpan Municipality =

Municipality in Puebla, Mexico

Coordinates: 18.4249°N 97.1226°W

Ajalpan
- Municipality
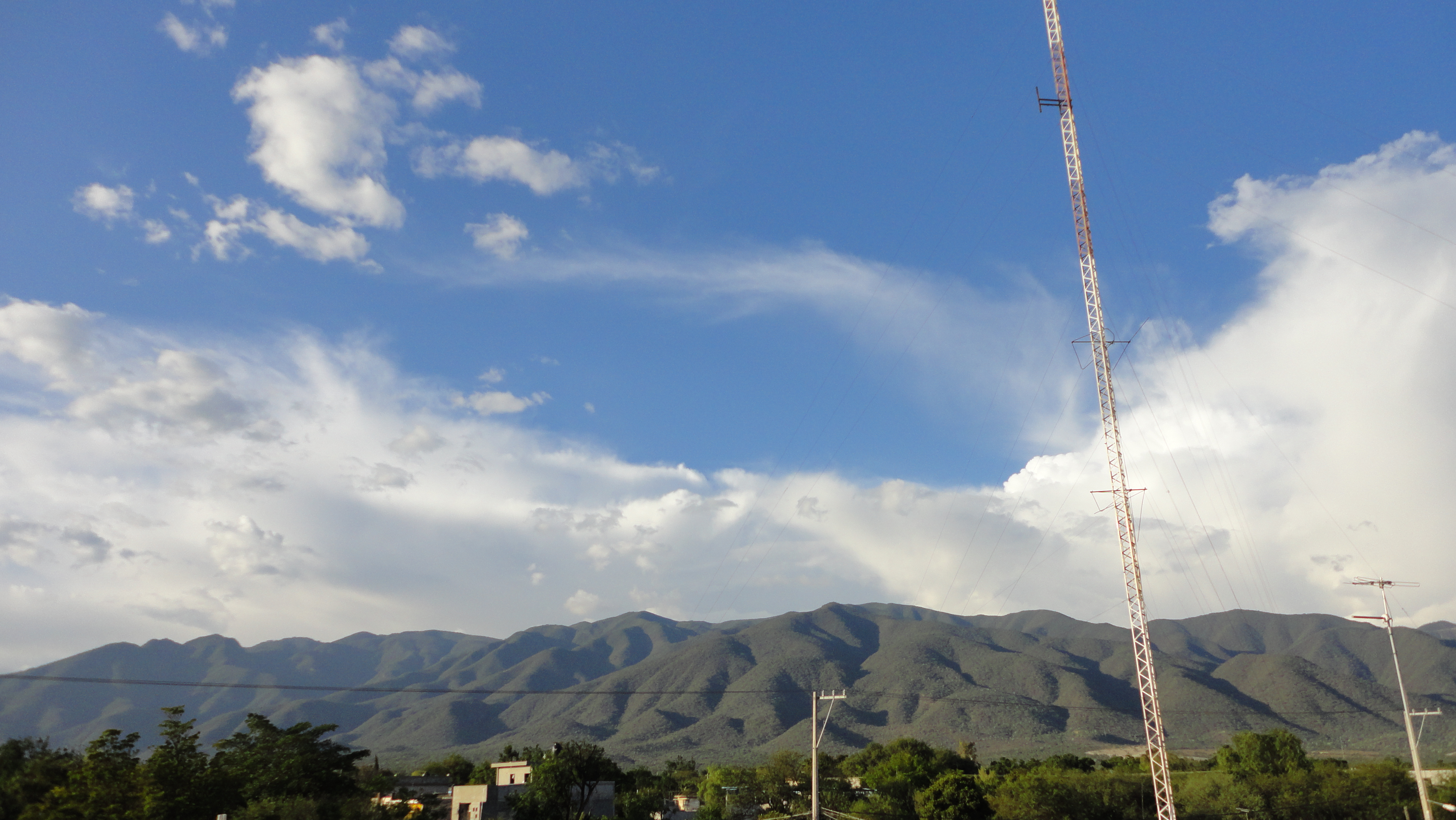

- Coat of arms

- Location of the municipality in Puebla
- Country: Mexico
- State: Puebla
- Municipal seat: Ajalpan

Population (2020)
  - Total: 74,768
- Time zone: UTC-6 (Central)

Ajalpan is a municipality in the Mexican state of Puebla. The municipal seat is in Ajalpan. As of 2020, it has a population of 74,768.
