= Rockercoatl =

Mexican Nahuatl-language band

- Origin: Puebla, Mexico
- Genres: Cumbia; mariachi; polka; blues; folk; metal
- Years active: 2000–present
- Members: Juan Manuel Sánchez; Alejandro Fierro Aragón; Rafael Romero Larios; Emanuel Romero Larios; Julio César Martínez González

Rockercoatl is a Mexican rock band known for performing songs in the Nahuatl language. Founded in 2000 in Puebla, with its name deriving from the Nahuatl term for "rock snake", the band's music fuses genres including cumbia, mariachi, polka, blues, folk and metal.

== History ==
In 2000, the National Endowment for Culture and Arts, a public agency of the Mexican government to support, promote and disseminate the country's culture, helped support the establishment of Rockercoatl. The band was created because of an identified gap in Mexican musical culture, specifically concerning songs performed in Nahuatl, which tended either to be direct translations of Spanish language songs, or to consist of lyrics derived from ancient Nahuatl texts. The band was founded by Juan Manuel Sánchez, a native of Tlacotepec de Benito Juárez, Puebla, who performed under the stage name Kenametzi (lit. 'little giant'). That year, the band release its eponymous debut album, Rockercoatl, composed of contemporary songs written and performed in Nahuatl.

The band's second album, Piltontzintzin ihuan Pocotzitzin Tlenica motztla mohuicatia (2005), was produced following financial support from the Programa de apoyo a las culturas municpales y comunitarias, after Sánchez participated in a project in San Miguel Canoa focused on the rescue of Nahuatl and the creation of music in the language.

By 2010, ahead of the release of Rockercoatl's third album, Mochipa Forever, four permanent members joined the group, including guitarist Alejandro Fierro Aragón, guitarist and accordionist Rafael Romero Larios, bassist Emanuel Romero Larios and drummer Julio César Marŧínez González.

Rockercoatl has performed at different musical festivals, including the Festival Internacional Cervantino, Festival Internacional 5 de Mayo, La Muerte es un Sueño and the Festival Internacional de Puebla, as well as at cultural venues such as the Circo Volador in Mexico City. Internationally, Rockercoatl has performed in the Dominican Republic, Panama and France.

== Nemi Rockercoatl ==
In 2010, Rockercoatl was the subject of a feature-length documentary film entitled Nemi Rockercoatl, directed by Oscar Flores Solano. The film focused on Sánchez and his efforts to revitalise the Nahuatl language through music. It was screened at film festivals including the Oaxaca International Film Festival, the Puebla International Indigenous Film and Video Showcase and the DocsTown International Documentary Film Showcase. It also aired at the Tianguis Cultural del Chopo, a counterculture flea market in Mexico City.

== Discography ==
- Rockercoatl (2010)
- Piltontzintzin ihuan Pocotzintzin Tlenica motztla mohuicatia (2005)
- Mochipa Forever (2010)
