= Mario Mendoza Cortés =

Mexican politician (1968-2015)

- Born: 25 July 1968; Puebla, Mexico
- Died: 26 September 2007 (aged 39); Indios Verdes, Mexico City, Mexico
- Education: Benemérita Universidad Autónoma de Puebla, Columbia Business School
- Occupation: Politician
- Political party: PRI
- Children: 1
- Family: Fabiola Fierro (wife), Nicole Mendoza (daughter)

Mario Mendoza Cortés (25 July 1968 – 26 September 2007) was a Mexican politician from the Institutional Revolutionary Party (PRI).

Mendoza Cortés was born in the Sierra Negra region of the state of Puebla in 1968. He studied at the Benemérita Universidad Autónoma de Puebla (BUAP), Columbia Business School and Columbia College.

In the 2006 general election he was elected to the Chamber of Deputies to represent Puebla's 16th district during the 60th session of Congress.

In the early hours of 26 September 2007, Mendoza Cortés was involved in a road accident at the entrance to Mexico City along the highway from the state of Hidalgo and died from his injuries the same day. He was replaced for the remainder of his congressional term by his alternate, Guillermina López Balbuena.
