= Coyomeapan =

Coordinates: 18°16′N 96°59′W

- Municipality and town
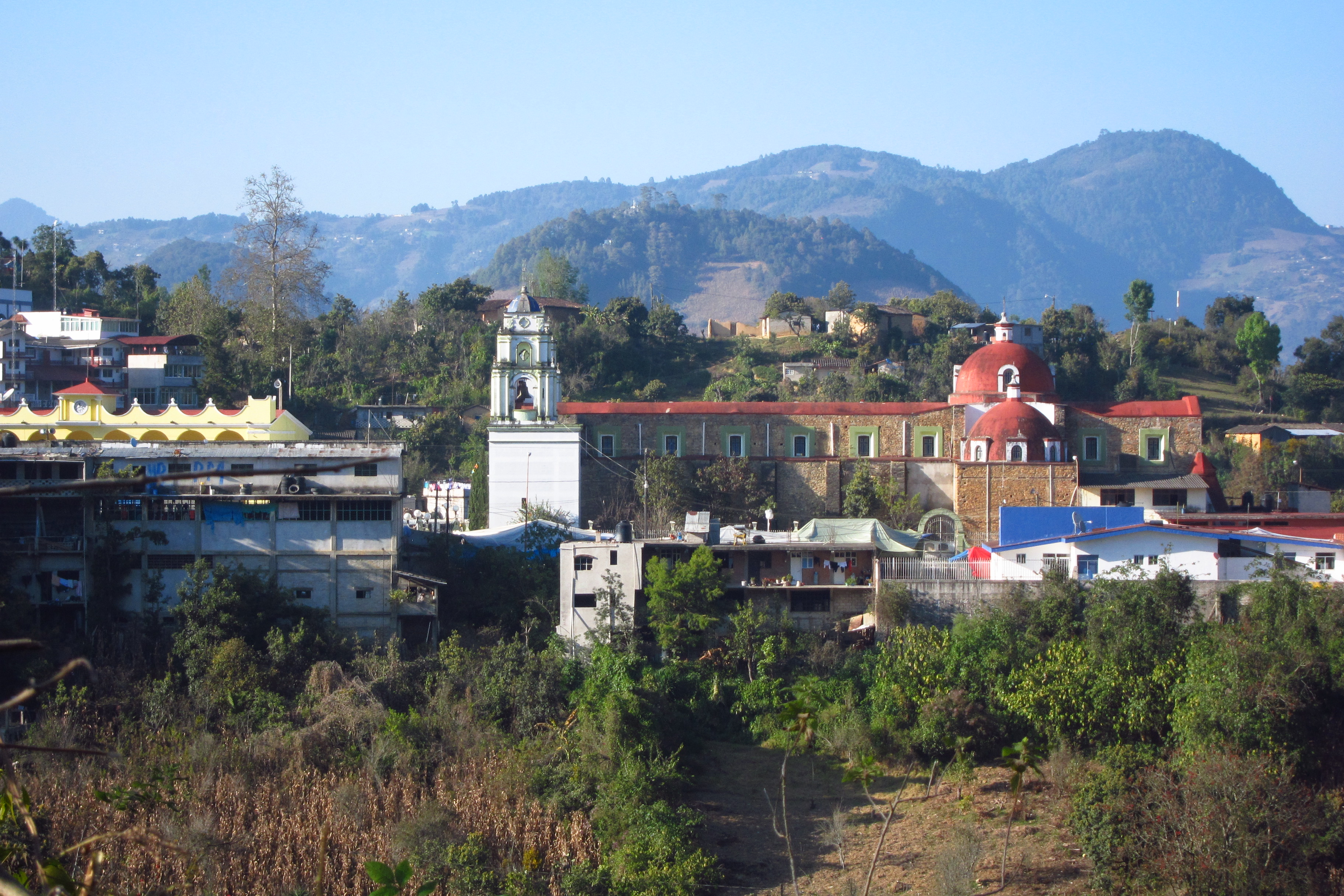
- View of town center with Parroquia de Santa María Magdalena

- Coat of arms
- Interactive map of Coyomeapan
- Country: Mexico
- State: Puebla
- Time zone: UTC-6 (Zona Centro)

Coyomeapan is a town and municipality in the Mexican state of Puebla.

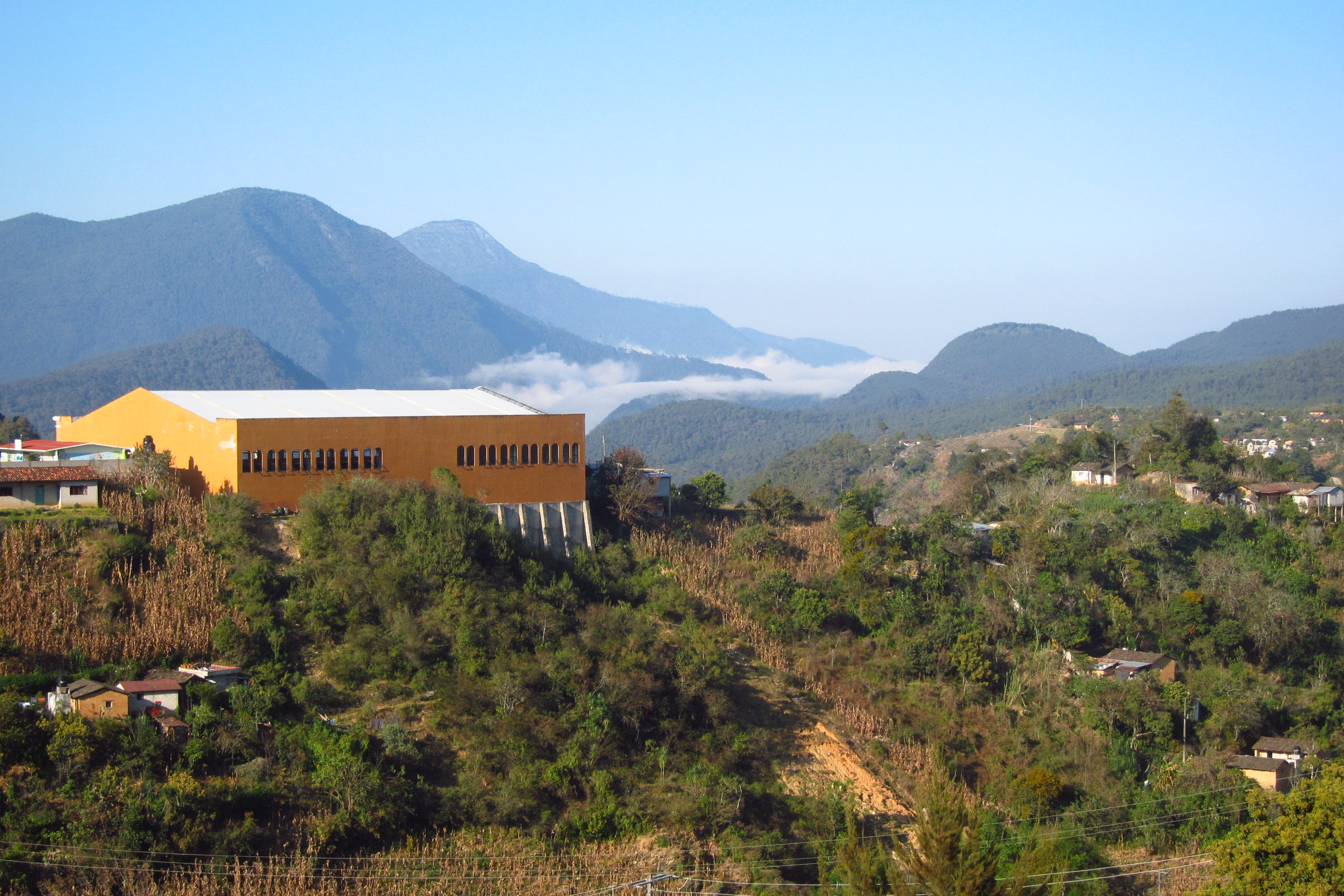
Multipurpose building in the town center

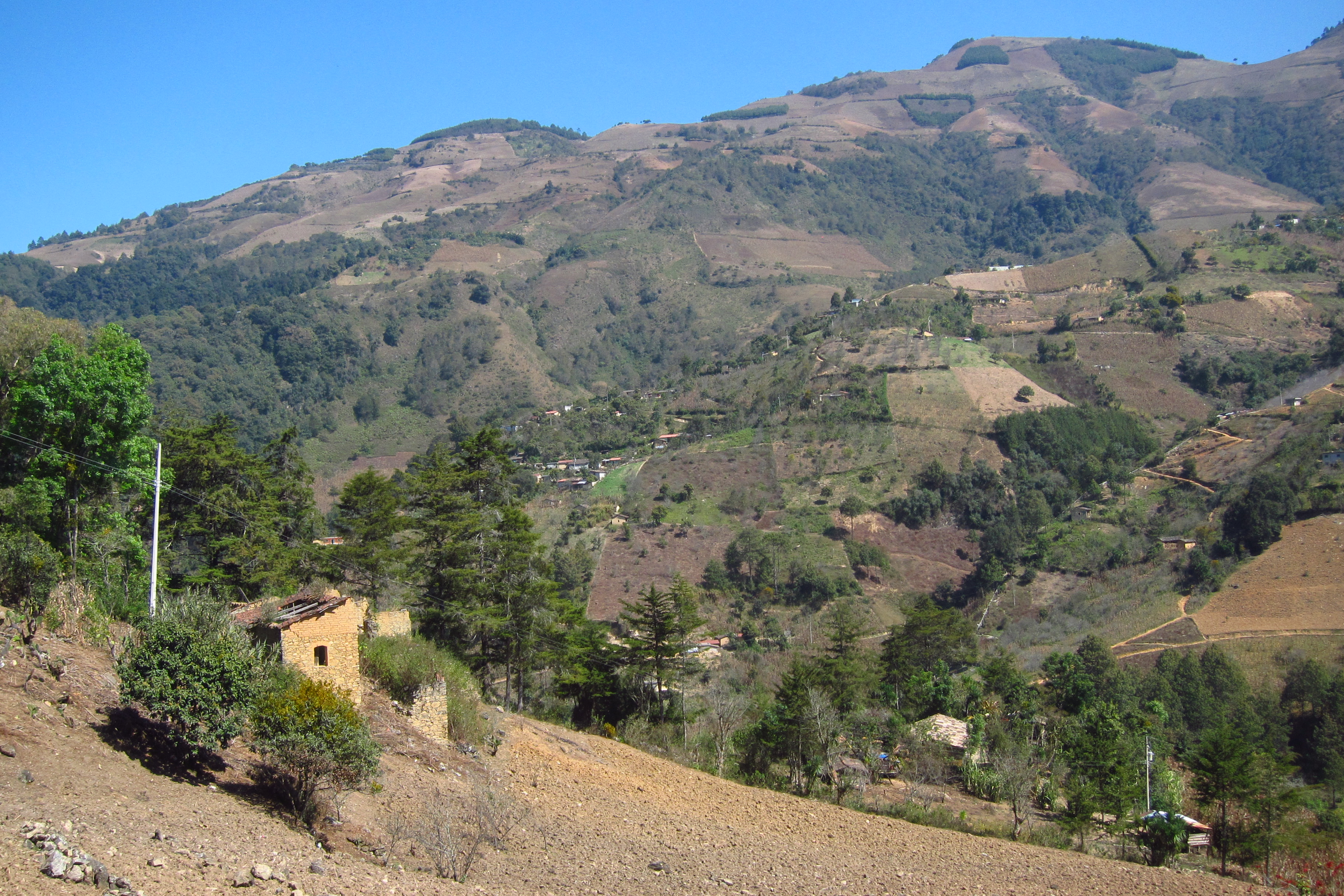
View of hillside leaving town center
