= Tochtepec =

- Municipality and town
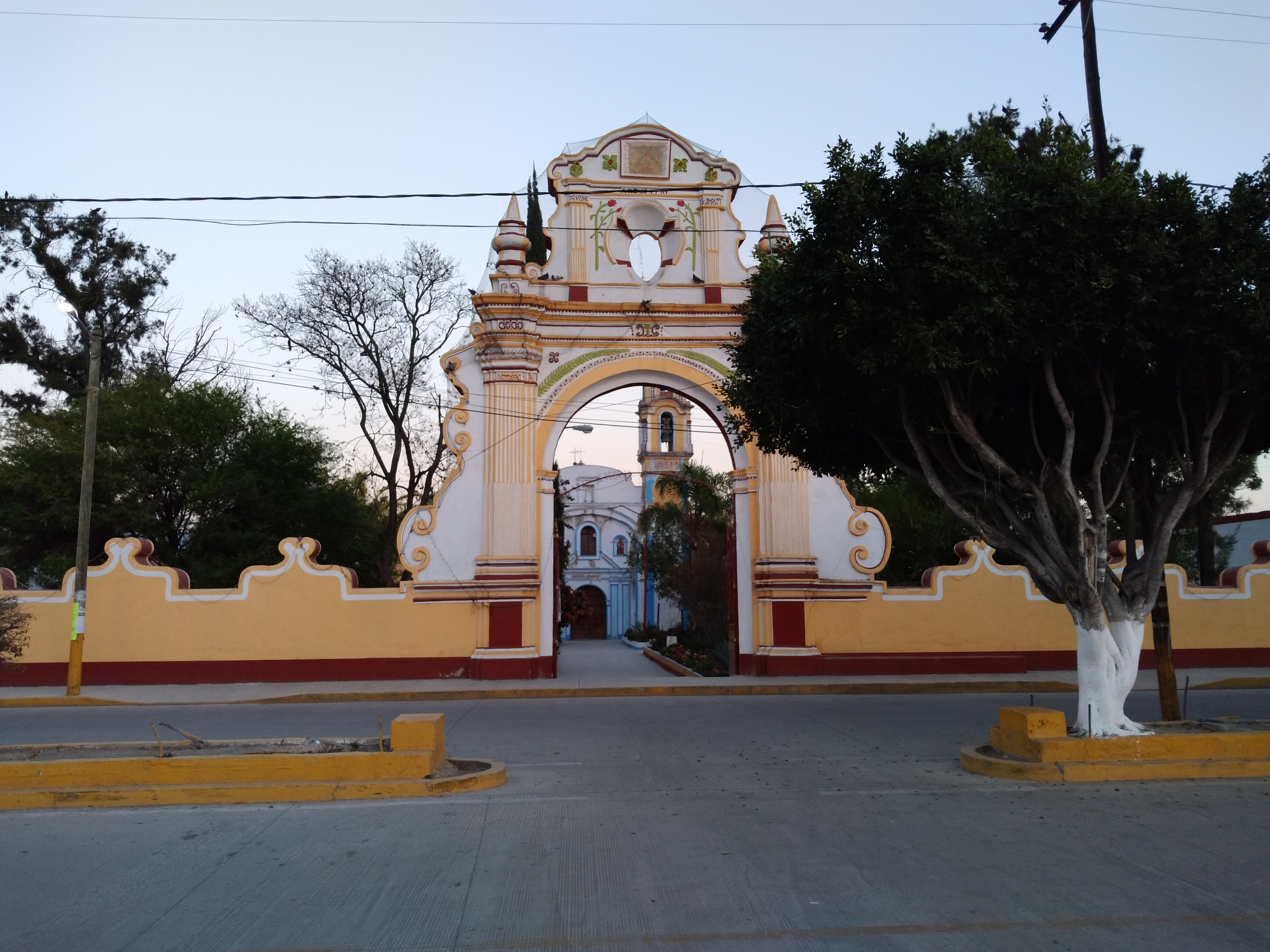
- Church of Santa María de la Natividad

- Location within Puebla (state) Location within Mexico
- Coordinates: 18°50′N 97°49′W
- Country: Mexico
- State: Puebla

Government
  - Federal electoral district: Puebla's 16th

Population (2020)
  - Total: 22,454
- (municipality)
- Time zone: UTC-6 (Zona Centro)
- Website: tochtepec.puebla.gob.mx

Tochtepec is a town and its surrounding municipality in the Mexican state of Puebla. Its name derives from the Nahuatl words tochtli (rabbit) and tepetl (hill).

In the 2020 census, the municipality reported a total population of 22,454, up 14% from 2010.
