= San Gabriel Chilac =

Coordinates: 18°19′N 97°21′W

San Gabriel Chilac is the municipal seat of San Gabriel Chilac Municipality in the Mexican state of Puebla. It is located near the city of Tehuacán.
