= FONCA =

Mexican public fund for art creation

The National Endowment for Culture and Arts (Fondo Nacional para la Cultura y las Artes, FONCA) is a public agency of the Mexican federal government, attached to the National Council for Culture and the Arts (Conaculta). Funding for FONCA comes from both the government and the private sector.

It was created in 1989, during the administration of President Carlos Salinas de Gortari in order to:

- support artistic and cultural creations of high quality;
- promote and disseminate culture;
- increase the country's cultural wealth;
- and preserve and protect the nation's cultural heritage.

Part of its mission is to promote and encourage artistic creation by awarding monetary grants and scholarships for high-quality art projects. This process begins with calls for proposals, some of which are then selected as recipients in accordance with principles of democratic participation, equality of opportunities, and judgement by peers.

== Projects ==
The Nahuatl-language musical band Rockercoatl, established in 2000, released their eponymous debut album following funding from FONCA.
