= Juan N. Méndez (municipality) =

Coordinates: 18°32′35″N 97°46′23″W

- Municipality
- Location of the municipality in Puebla
- Country: Mexico
- State: Puebla
- Time zone: UTC-6 (Zona Centro)

Juan N. Méndez Municipality is a municipality in the Mexican state of Puebla in south-eastern Mexico.
