= Huitziltepec =

Coordinates: 17.7556°N 99.4794°W

- Municipality
- Interactive map of Huitziltepec
- Country: Mexico
- State: Puebla
- Time zone: UTC-6 (Zona Centro)

Huitziltepec is a municipality in the Mexican state of Puebla.
