= Molcaxac =

Coordinates: 18°44′N 97°54′W

Molcaxac Lugar de gorriones Molcaxac de progreso Puebla
- Municipality and town
- Interactive map of Molcaxac
- Country: Mexico
- State: Puebla
- Time zone: UTC-6 (Zona Centro)

Molcaxac is a town and municipality in the Mexican state of Puebla.
