= Eloxochitlán, Puebla =

Coordinates: 18.5088°N 96.9227°W

Eloxochitlán
- Municipality

- Location within Puebla (state) Location within Mexico
- Country: Mexico
- State: Puebla
- Time zone: UTC-6 (Central)

Eloxochitlán is a municipality located in the southeastern part of the Mexican state of Puebla. In the town there is a high rate of indigenous population: about 44%. Eloxochitlán has a population of over 14,000 and is one of the poorest places in Puebla, with about 95% of the population living with "scarce resources".

== Geography ==
Eloxochitlán is located in the southeast of the state of Puebla. It borders to the north with the state of Veracruz, south, with Zoquitlán, east Tlacotepec de Porfirio Díaz and west Ajalpan. It covers an area of 109 square kilometers.

== History ==
By the late postclassic period (1200-1521 CE), the people of Eloxochitlán were descended from the Nonoalca Chichimeca and spoke Nahuatl.

== Demography ==
Their marginalization index is 2.260, the second highest score in the state. It is estimated that 44% of the population is indigenous.

== Economy ==
The municipality is mainly engaged in agriculture focusing on production of grains such as corn, beans and coffee. The second main activity of the municipality is raising livestock mainly cattle, pigs, goats, sheep, horses and poultry, mainly chicken.

== Culture ==
90% of the population is Catholic. The supervisory celebration is held in honor of San Miguel Archangel at the end of September each year.

== Bibliography ==
- State Center of Municipal Development, Semblanza of the 7 Socioeconomic Regions of the State of Puebla, Mexico, 1991.
- Government of the State of Puebla, State Population Council, 1995 Spatial Distribution of Population, Mexico.
- Government of the State of Puebla, State Population Council, Synthesis Sociodemographic 1970–1992, Mexico.
- Government of the State of Puebla, Ministry of Education, Statistics courses start 1996–1997.
- Government of the State of Puebla, Interior Ministry, Municipalities of Puebla, Mexico, 1988.
- National Institute of Statistics, Geography and Informatics, Statistical Yearbook of the State of Puebla, Mexico, 1996.
- National Institute of Statistics, Geography and Informatics, Census of Population and Housing 1995, Final Results, Puebla.
- National Institute of Statistics, Geography and Informatics, XI General Census of Population and Housing, Mexico, 1990.
