= Tlacotepec de Benito Juárez =

Coordinates: 18.6882°N 97.6489°W

- Municipality and town
- Interactive map of Tlacotepec de Benito Juárez
- Country: Mexico
- State: Puebla
- Time zone: UTC-6 (Zona Centro)

Tlacotepec de Benito Juárez is a town and municipality in the Mexican state of Puebla.

== Notable residents ==
- Juan Manual Sánchez (also known as Kenametzi), lead singer of the Nahuatl music group Rockercoatl.
