= Coxcatlán Municipality, Puebla =

Coordinates: 18.2704°N 97.1336°W

Coxcatlán
- Municipality
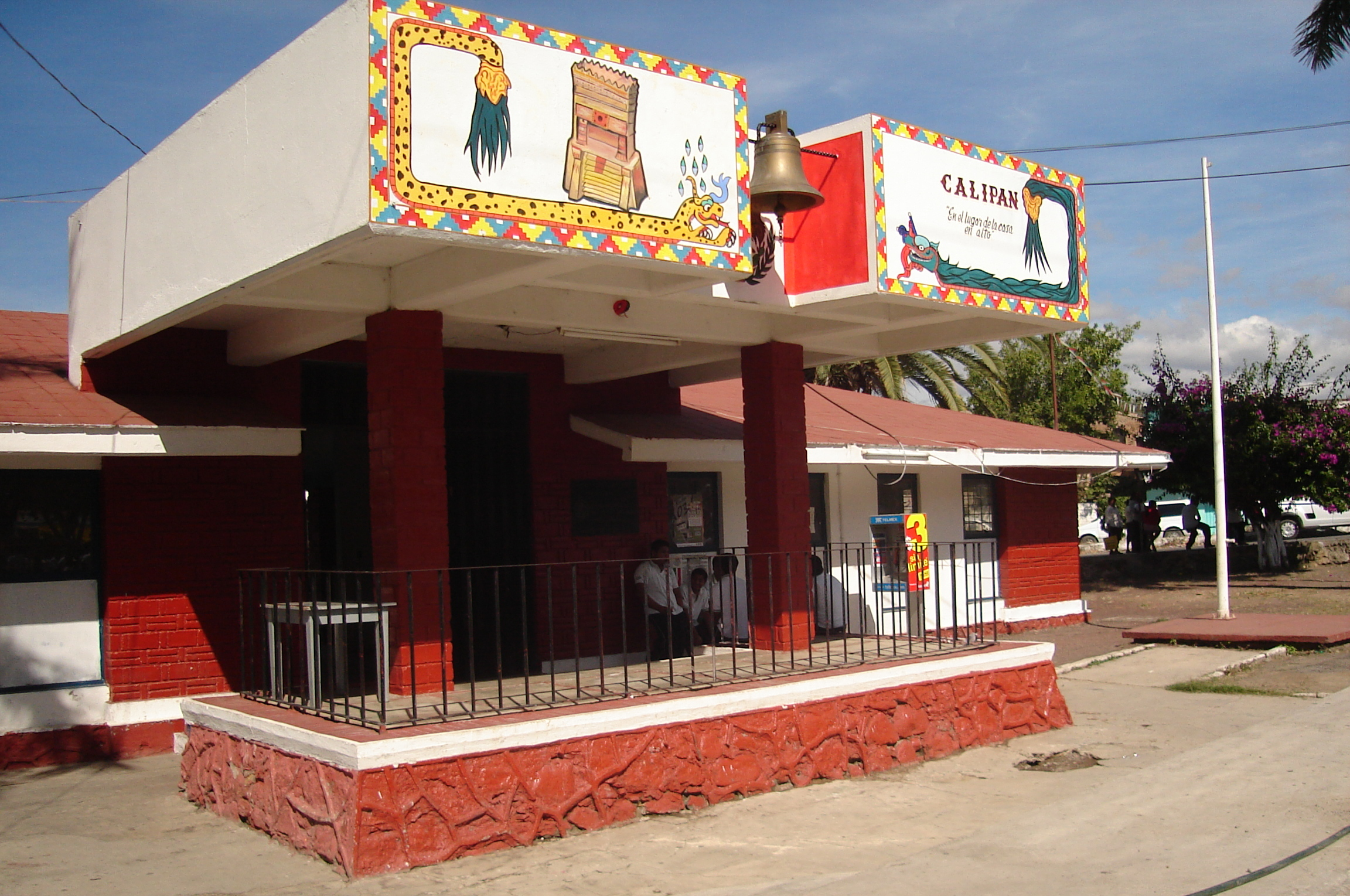

- Coat of arms

- Location of the municipality in Puebla
- Country: Mexico
- State: Puebla

Population (2020)
  - Total: 20,653
- Time zone: UTC-6 (Zona Centro)

Coxcatlán is a municipality in the Mexican state of Puebla.

In the prehispanic period, Coxcatlan was the center of an autonomous polity which was majority Nahua. It surrendered to Hernán Cortés in 1520.
