= International Editor of the Year Award =

International Editor of the Year Award is a prize awarded yearly to journalists and press editors outside the United States by World Press Review (Worldpress.org) magazine.

The award has been presented by World Press Review Since 1975 to an editor or editors outside the United States whose work, according to the magazine "best exemplifies the principles of journalism."

According to Worldpress.org editorial, the award is granted to journalists "in recognition of enterprise, courage and leadership in advancing the freedom and responsibility of the press, enhancing human rights and fostering excellence in journalism."

== Award winners ==
- 1978: S Nihal Singh, The Statesman, Calcutta/New Delhi & S. Mulgaokar, Indian Express, New Delhi.
- 1982 Arun Shourie, editor of Indian Express in India
- 1983 Gershom Schocken, editor of Haaretz in Israel
- 1994 Indro Montanelli, founder of La Voce and Il Giornale, journalist for Il Corriere della Sera and other newspapers, war correspondent during the 1930s and the 1940s
- 1999 Paul Kamara, editor of For Di People in Sierra Leone
- 2004 Shukria Barakzai, founder of Aina-E-Zan (Women’s Mirror), a weekly newspaper in Afghanistan that campaigns for women's rights.
- 2005-6 Three Mexican journalists, Raúl Gibb Guerrero, Dolores Guadalupe García Escamilla and Alfredo Jiménez Mota.
