= Totonacapan =

Historical region in Mexico

Coordinates: 20°27′28″N 97°21′19″W

- People: Totonac
- Language: Totonac
- Country: Totonacapan

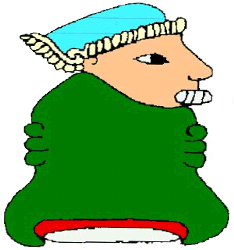
Glyph of Cempoala, the capital city of Totonacapan

Totonacapan refers to the historical extension where the Totonac people of Mexico dominated, as well as to a region in the modern states of Veracruz and Puebla. The historical territory was much larger than the currently named region, extending from the Cazones River in the north to the Papaloapan River in the south and then west from the Gulf of Mexico into what is now the Sierra Norte de Puebla region and into parts of Hidalgo. When the Spanish arrived, the Totonac ethnicity dominated this large region, although they themselves were dominated by the Aztec Empire. For this reason, they allied with Hernán Cortés against Tenochtitlán. However, over the colonial period, the Totonac population and territory shrank, especially after 1750 when mestizos began infiltrating Totonacapan, taking political and economic power. This continued into the 19th and 20th centuries, prompting the division of most of historical Totonacpan between the states of Puebla and Veracruz. Today, the term refers only to a region in the north of Veracruz where Totonac culture is still important. This region is home to the El Tajín and Cempoala archeological sites as well as Papantla, which is noted for its performance of the Danza de los Voladores.

== History ==
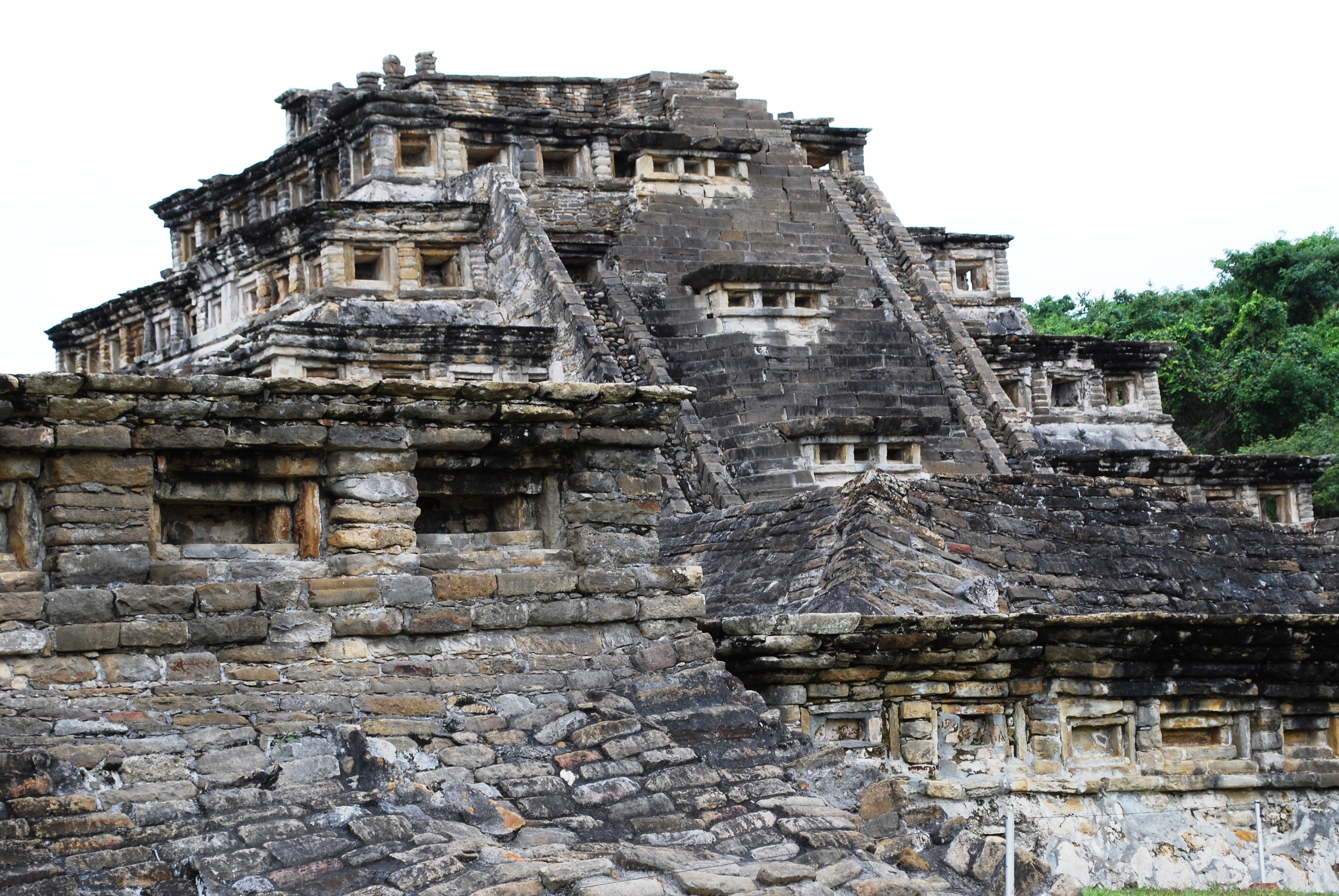
Pyramid of the Niches in El Tajín

The earliest human settlements in the area date back to about 2000 BCE with agriculture practiced early with those communities on the coast having seafood prominent in the diet, especially mollusks. The area thrived with many small villages and ceremonial center because of abundant agricultural production. The beginning of the Classic period around 300BCE brought great changes to the region as it became part of an important trade route between Teotihuacan and the Maya. Evidence of Teotihuacan influence become evident including religion and architecture.

The name "Totonacapan" is from the Totonac people (+ "pan" meaning "place"), who probably arrived to the area between the 8th and 9th centuries. It was populated by other cultures before this, which have since been lost. It is not known how the Totonacs came to occupy and dominate the region, and there are several theories, some of which point to links with Teotihuacan and/or a migration from the interior towards the Gulf coast. Their main archeological sites include El Tajín, Cempoala and Yohualichan (in the Sierra Norte de Puebla). El Tajín is considered crucial to Totonac identity. The territory originally extended from the Papaloapan River in the south to the Cazones River in the north, the Gulf of Mexico on the east and into the Sierra Madre Oriental mountains to the west into what is now the Sierra Norte de Puebla and perhaps even as far as Tulancingo. However, these western areas had become ethnically mixed due to influxes of Nahuas and Otomis long before the Spanish arrived. They were also heavily influenced by the Olmec.

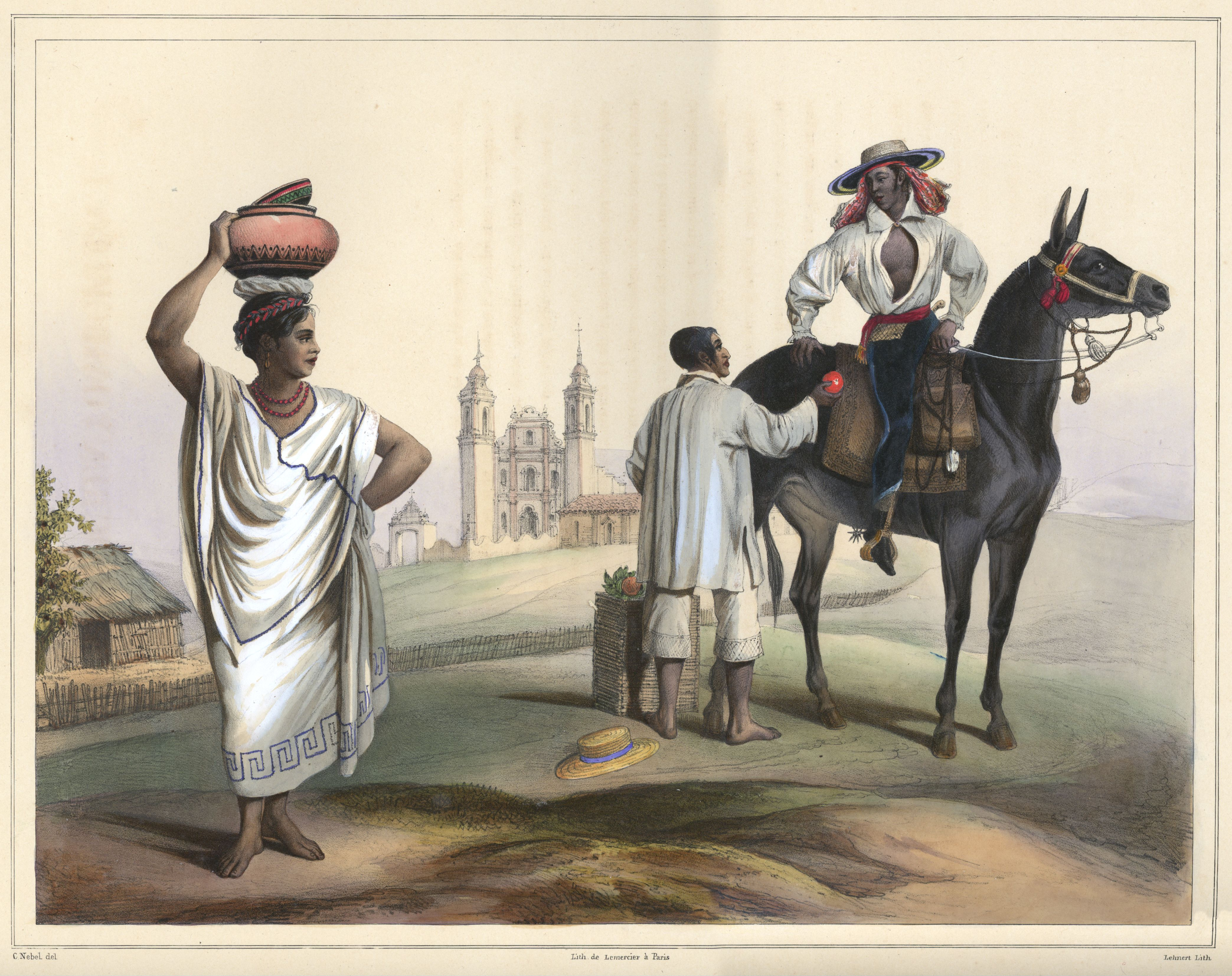
19th century Carl Nebel lithograph of people from Totonacapan

When the Spanish arrived in the 16th century, the region was dominated by the Totonacs, who were then in turn dominated by the Aztec Empire. Because of this, the Totonacs allied with the Spanish against the Aztecs to conquer Tenochtitlán. However, war, disease and forced labor brought the Totonac population down drastically. The Totonac population in Cempoala is estimated to have been about 80,000 when the Spanish arrived in 1519 but with only eighty left in 1550. The Spanish also took their lands for cattle raising until the ethnicity occupied only about half of what it used to. In many areas, the Totonac population was replaced by Spanish, mestizo and African peoples. Until the 17th century, the Spanish mostly respected Totonac leadership as their help against the Aztec made them non-threatening militarily. Evangelization was likewise slow, with only sixteen parishes in all of Totonacapan by 1750.

This means that until 1750, the political and social situation in Totonacapan was relatively stable. However, from this time to the present various political, social and economic developments have served to weaken and split Totonac control over its historical territory. Mestizos began to take indigenous land and felt sufficiently powerful enough to begin taking political and military power. From 1750 to 1820, there were a series of Totonac revolts against these incursions, especially in the Papantla and Orizaba regions. This rebellion caused the Totonacs to ally with the cause for independence early, led by Serafín Olarte, but they were crushed by royalist forces.

The struggle continued after Independence with a new insurrection led by Olarte's son, Mariano Olarte with the flash point being the prohibition of Totonac Holy Week rites, which the Puebla diocese deemed “too pagan.” The first president of Mexico, Guadalupe Victoria, who had fought with Serafín Olarte, mediated the dispute but was unable to get the diocese to relent. The rebellions by the Totonac spurred mestizo and Spanish authorities into a series of moves that resulted in the splitting of historical Totonacapan mostly between the modern states of Veracruz and Puebla, with some small areas now part of Hidalgo over the course of the 19th century. Borders fluctuated over this time but were set by the beginning of Mexican Revolution.

The mestizos, meanwhile, were privatizing communally held land, confiscating religious property and prohibiting public worship to weaken the power of indigenous authorities. The Totonacs had some luck in turning the tide during the Mexican Revolution but these gains were lost in the 1930s. The process of dividing Totonacapan into various smaller entities politically and economically continued through the 20th century. One development was the construction of the Mexico City-Tuxpan highway and the development of petroleum extraction in the Poza Rica area. The Teziutlán-Tlatlauquitepec highway to Tenampulco reinforced a Veracruz/Puebla border.

While there is still a very large population of Totonacs in both states, as Mexico's tenth largest indigenous group, today, what is called Totonacapan is only a fraction of former Totonac lands. It refers to a region in Veracruz, which is made up of fifteen municipalities: Cazones de Herrera, Coahuitlán, Coatzintla, Coyutla, Chumatlan, Espinal, Filomeno Mata, Gutiérrez Zamora, Mecatlán, Papantla, Poza Rica de Hidalgo, Tecolutla, Tihuatlán, and Zozocolco de Hidalgo. The Totonac population continues to decline in both states, especially since the 1980s with many migrating out due to the poor economy of the region. History has put pressure on the Totonac language, with speakers switching over to Spanish and in some cases, to Nahuatl even though those who change language still consider themselves Totonac.

== Archeological sites ==
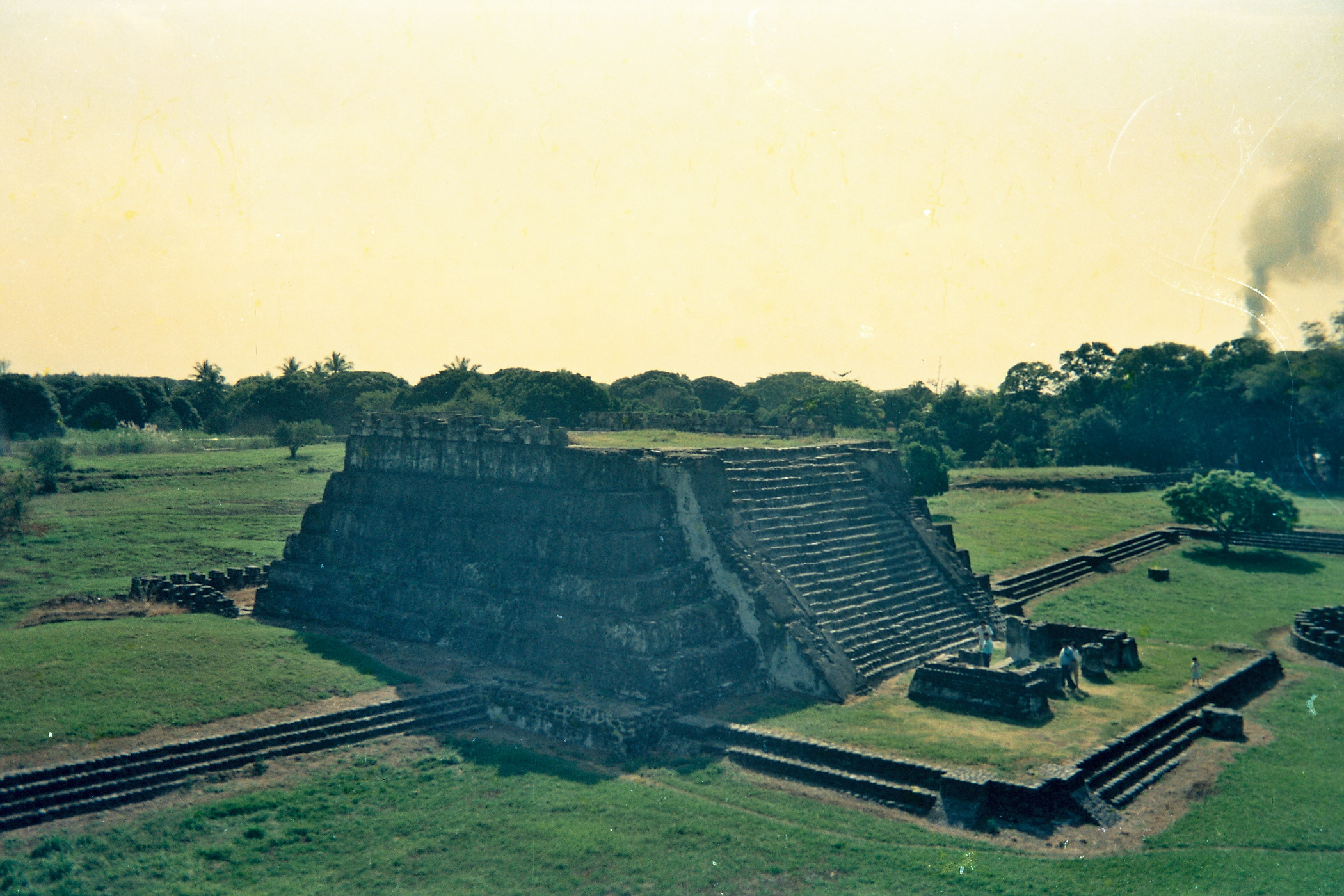
Pyramid at the Cempoala site

The most important archeological site in the region is El Tajín, located near Papantla, and is one of the largest and most important cities of the Classic era of Mesoamerica. A part of the Classic Veracruz culture, El Tajín flourished from 600 to 1200 C.E. and during this time numerous temples, palaces, ballcourts, and pyramids were built.

El Tajín was named a World Heritage Site in 1992, due to its cultural importance, especially to the Totonac people and its architecture. This architecture includes the use of decorative niches and cement in forms unknown in the rest of Mesoamerica. Its best-known monument is the Pyramid of the Niches, but other important monuments include the Arroyo Group, the North and South Ballcourts and the palaces of Tajín Chico. Since the 1970s, El Tajin has been the most important archeological site in Veracruz for tourists, attracting over 650,000 visitors a year.

The next most important site is Cempoala which during the height of the Totonacs, was the most important city. It was still important when the Spanish arrived, but it became mostly abandoned afterwards.

The area contains some of the earliest known archeological sites in Veracruz such as Trapiche, Chalahuite el Viejón, Limoncito and Tlalixcoyan. One of the earliest sites dates to around 1500 BCE is Remojadas which is considered the center of a pre Totonac culture called by the same name.

== Geography and environment ==
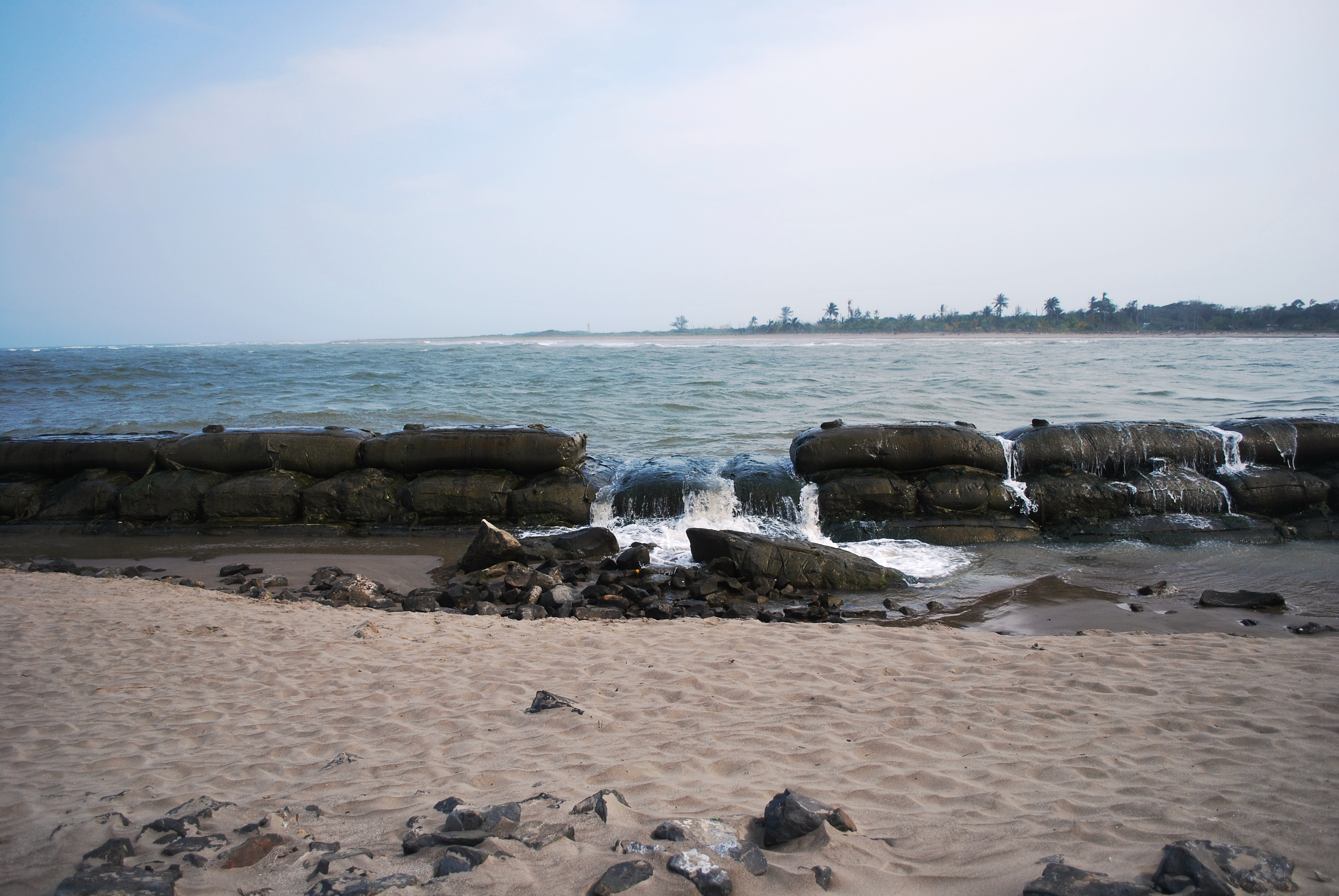
Mouth of the Tecolutla River

Most of the modern Totonacapan of Veracruz state extends from the coast to the edges of the Sierra Madre Oriental, with altitudes of between zero and 800 meters above sea level. Most of it has a hot and humid climate with extreme lows reaching 5C in the highest elevations and high temperatures reaching 38C between March and June. The average annual temperature ranges from 15 to 20C. Annual rainfall averages between 1,500 and 1,800mm per year with most falling between July and November.

The most important rivers include Cazones, Tecolutla and Necaxa, which is a tributary of the Tecolutla. There are also numerous streams the largest of which include the Zozocolco, the Tecacán and the Chumatlán. The wild vegetation is tropical rainforest, rich in hardwoods with include species such as cedar, mahogany (Swietenia humilis and S. macrophylla), kapok fibre trees (Ceiba pentandra), Mexican laurel, Salix (willow) and fig species. However, their range is limited to less than 4,000 hectares (9,900 acres) in about seven municipalities. Wildlife includes squirrels, rabbits, armadillos, opossums, fresh and saltwater shrimp, trout, and various bird species.

== Economy ==
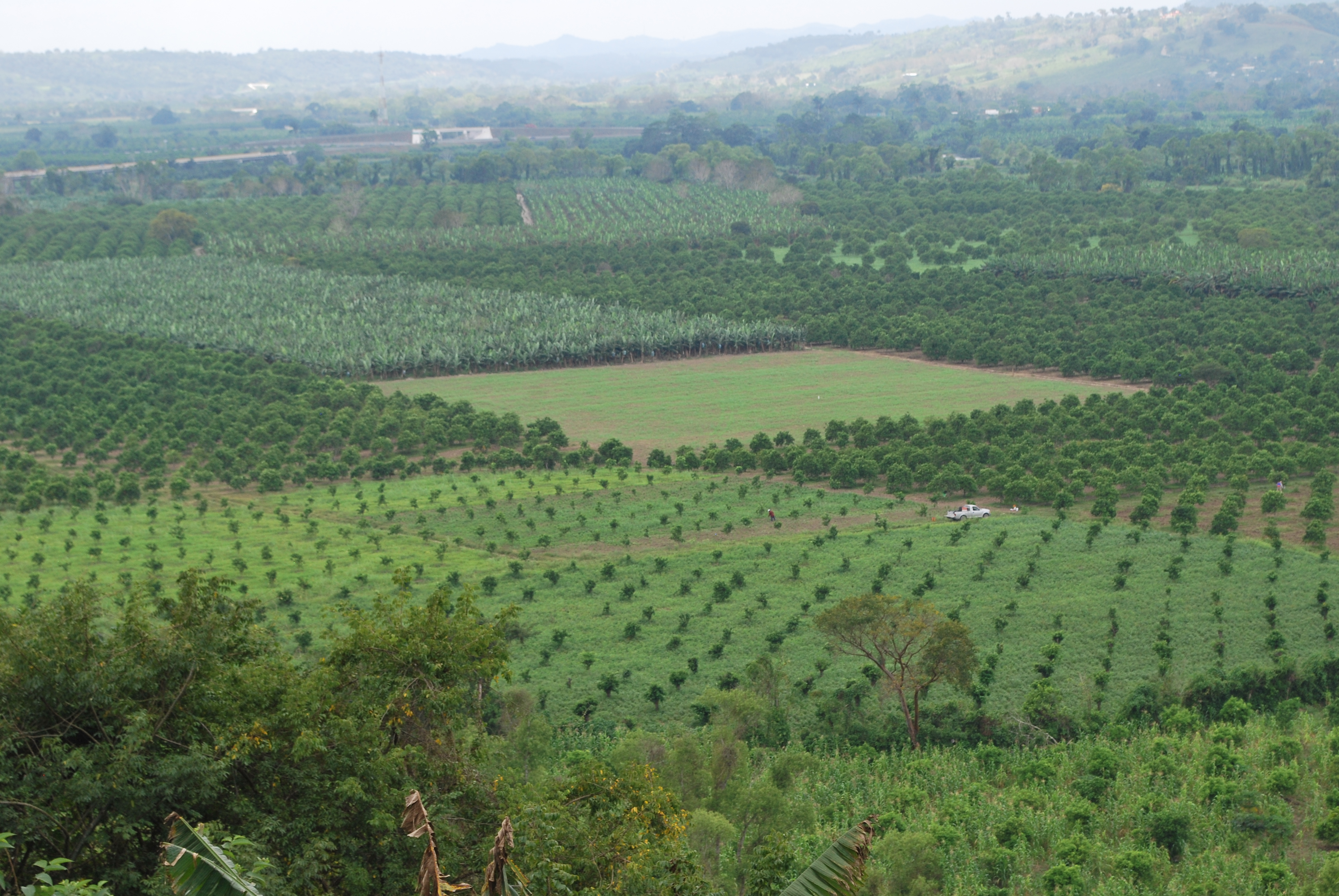
Fields in Cazones de Herrera

Totonacapan is one of Mexico poorest regions, despite the fact that there is oil production in and around Poza Rica. The reason is that much of the region is still isolated and rural. For example, Mecatlan is one of the sixty poorest municipalities in the country, with half of home without running water and seventy percent with dirt floors. Illiteracy is four times the national level. Infrastructure such as roadways and housing is in poor condition especially in the mountain areas. The construction of bridges is considered to be important to the regions development, especially to connect the coastline with the interior cities of Mexico.

The principal economic activities are agriculture, the raising of cattle and in some areas, fishing. The coastal areas mostly produce corn with two harvests per year along with beans, chili peppers, oranges, limes, grapefruit, mandarin oranges, sugar cane, bananas, vanilla, sesame seed and more. The mountain areas principally grow coffee, black pepper, sapote and red mamey. Much of the citrus fruit is exported. Aside from cattle there is some other livestock such as pigs, sheep, horses and domestic fowl as well as bees.

The mountain areas of the region are home to the vanilla plant, which is a kind of orchid which produces the bean from which the flavoring comes. The bean was highly valued long before the arrival of the Spanish, used for religious rituals, perfumes and healing potions as well as a flavoring. When the Aztecs conquered Totonacapan, part of the tribute was in vanilla beans, mostly used to flavor chocolate drinks in Tenochtitlán. In the recent past, vanilla was a major trade in the region, with a number of vanilla “barons” in the first half of the 20th century making fortunes as middlemen and exporters. However, it began to be grown more cheaply elsewhere and the creation of synthetic vanilla collapsed the market for authentic Mexican vanilla. Despite the quality due to ideal growing conditions, Mexico produces only fifteen percent of the world's vanilla. However, a number of entrepreneurs are working to bring the crop back experimenting with production rates and promoting the quality of Totonacapan-grown vanilla. The best vanilla still comes from here.

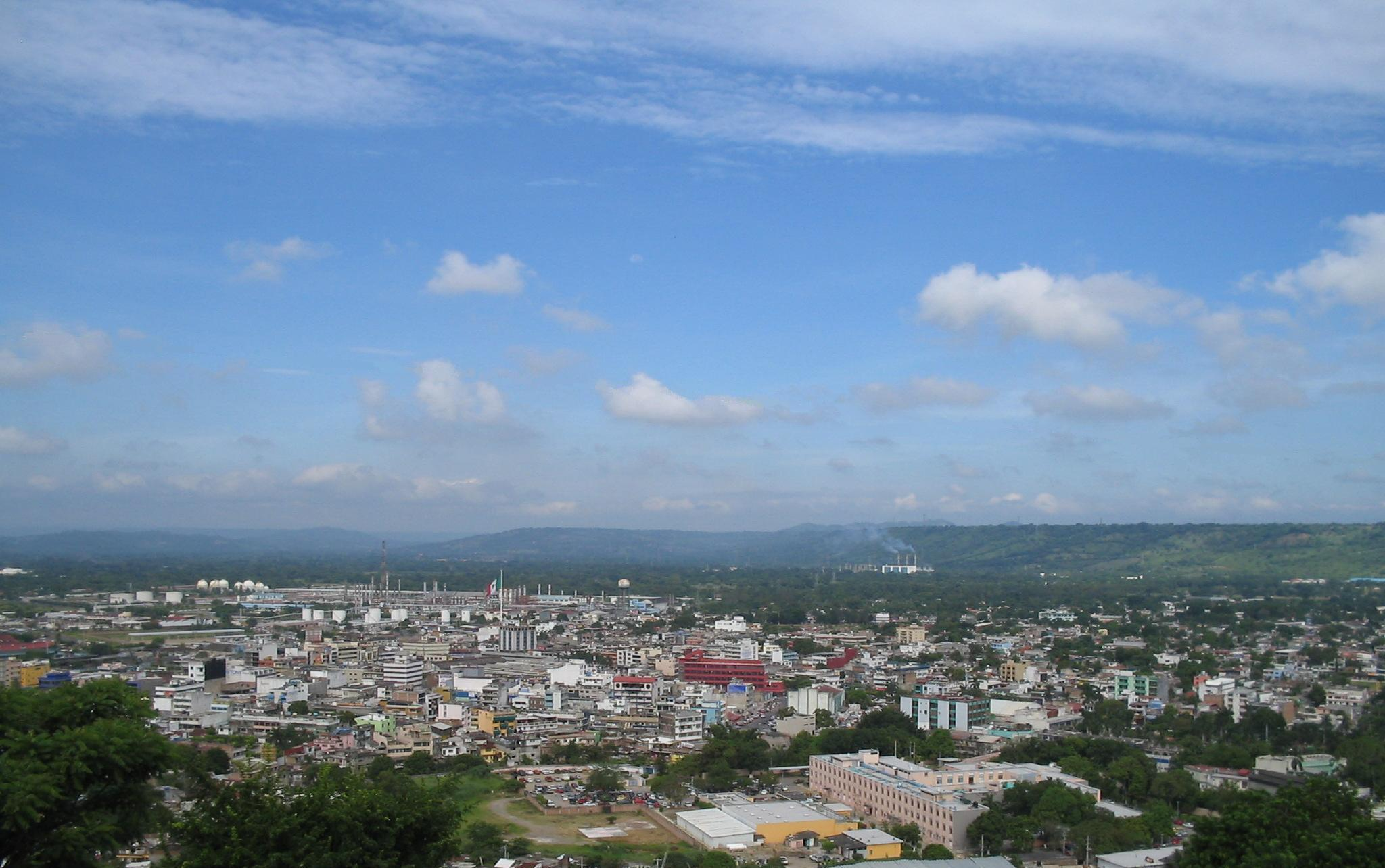
Panorama of downtown Poza Rica

The Tecolutla, Nautla and Vega de la Torre zones are fishing centers were cooperatives catch catfish, crayfish and other species although crayfish species are endangered.

The main industry is related to oil and gas production although this is limited to the very north of the region. There are also some small industries dedicated to the production of bricks, piloncillo, furniture and handcrafts.

One nascent economic initiative is ecotourism, with nature parks such as Parque Xanath just outside Papantla and the Totonac culture, especially the Voladores and the growing of vanilla. Papantla is the modern capital of Totonac culture, with a Volador pole in the atrium of the main church. Zozocolca has various waterfalls surrounded by large and leafy trees and slabs of rock which guide the water. Parque Takilhsukut is a nature park which is also dedicated to the preservation of Totonac culture with workshops, concerts, and more for both visitors and the local population. Its school for Voladores has children as young as nine. It is one of the sites of the Cumbre Tajín annual festival.

== Demographics and culture ==
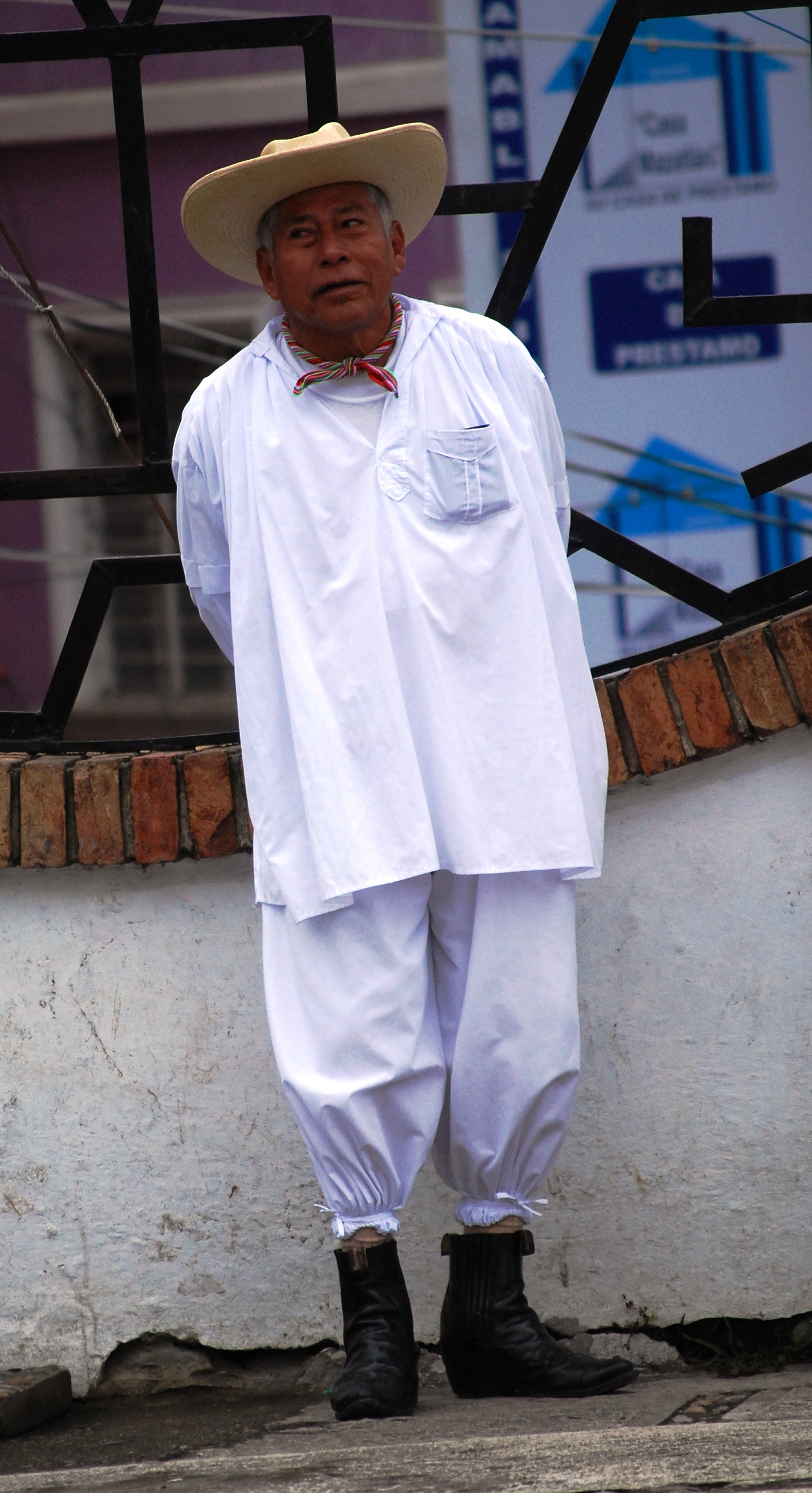
Totonac man in church atrium of Papantla

Although the Totonac people are no longer the dominant population in Totonacapan, their culture remains an important part of the Veracruz region still named for them. The various municipalities have formal, generally mestizo-dominated, governments but there are also councils of elders in many indigenous communities which have various relationships with the various municipal authorities.

Totonac languages are principally spoken in Veracruz, the north of Puebla and some areas of Hidalgo. Both of the main branches of the language are spoken in Totonacapan in Veracruz where about half of all Totonac speakers live. The percentage of ethnic Totonacs which speak the language is declining as parents stop teaching it to their children. This phenomenon is more pronounced in the lowland areas where it has all but disappeared in some places. The largest concentration of speakers is in Papantla with large concentrations on the Veracruz/Puebla border.

Traditional dances play an important part in Totonac identity. There are four basic categories: Voladores, those depicting aspects of the Spanish conquest, Afro-European and those which were imposed by Catholic clergy such as those performed during Las Posadas. The best known of these dances is the Ritual Ceremony of the Voladores of Papantla, which has been recognized as an Intangible Cultural Heritage by UNESCO. However, these dances are also waning and survive mostly in marginalized communities. In very poor communities, dances are dying out because the people do not have the time or money to make or maintain the elaborate costumes. As older instructors die, there are no younger ones to take their place.

Most of the population is Catholic although these are split into those who practice the traditional mix of indigenous and Catholic beliefs and reform Catholics who put less emphasis on the political and social aspects of traditional religious practice. In the 1950s, Protestantism was introduced to the area by the Instituto Lingüístico de Verano which now includes evangelists, Baptists and Pentecostals.

Much of the region's cuisine is based on corn, along with wild and cultivated plants and fruits. Much of traditional cuisine survives because of the area's relative remoteness and traditional women still cook over wood fires, grinding corn and other foods on metates. Dishes include soups made from squash, sweet corn and beans. Beans are flavored with sesame seed. Small dishes include tlacoyos with beans, chili peppers with sesame seed, tamales with salted fish, turkey and other fillings, enchiladas zampadas. Vegetable dishes include a green called quelite with beans or with herbs and eggs, chayote with squash seeds, enchiladas with mamey and nopal cactus with eggs. Seafood dishes include shrimp in various preparations including with sesame seed and sweet potato and grilled fish. Meats include various domestic fowl, pork, beef and rabbit, often smoked. Most ingredients are indigenous with a few exceptions such as sesame seed and almonds. Another common dish is zacahuil, which is a kind of corn pudding.

Another distinct ethnicity in the region is the Tepehua, whose language is similar to Totonac. Tepehua communities include Chicontepec and Huayacocotla.

The Cumbre Tajín is considered to be one of Mexico's five largest festivals and one of the 100 most important in the world. Centered on three sites over five days, the aim of the event is to promote Totonacapan's culture, identity and economy. The event had an economic impact of between 180 and 200 million pesos with over 400,000 visitors, temporarily employing 8,000 workers. The event attracts over 5,000 artists from Veracruz, Mexico and the world with about the same number of activities.

== See also ==
- Totonaca Region
