= Shukria Barakzai =

Afghan politician

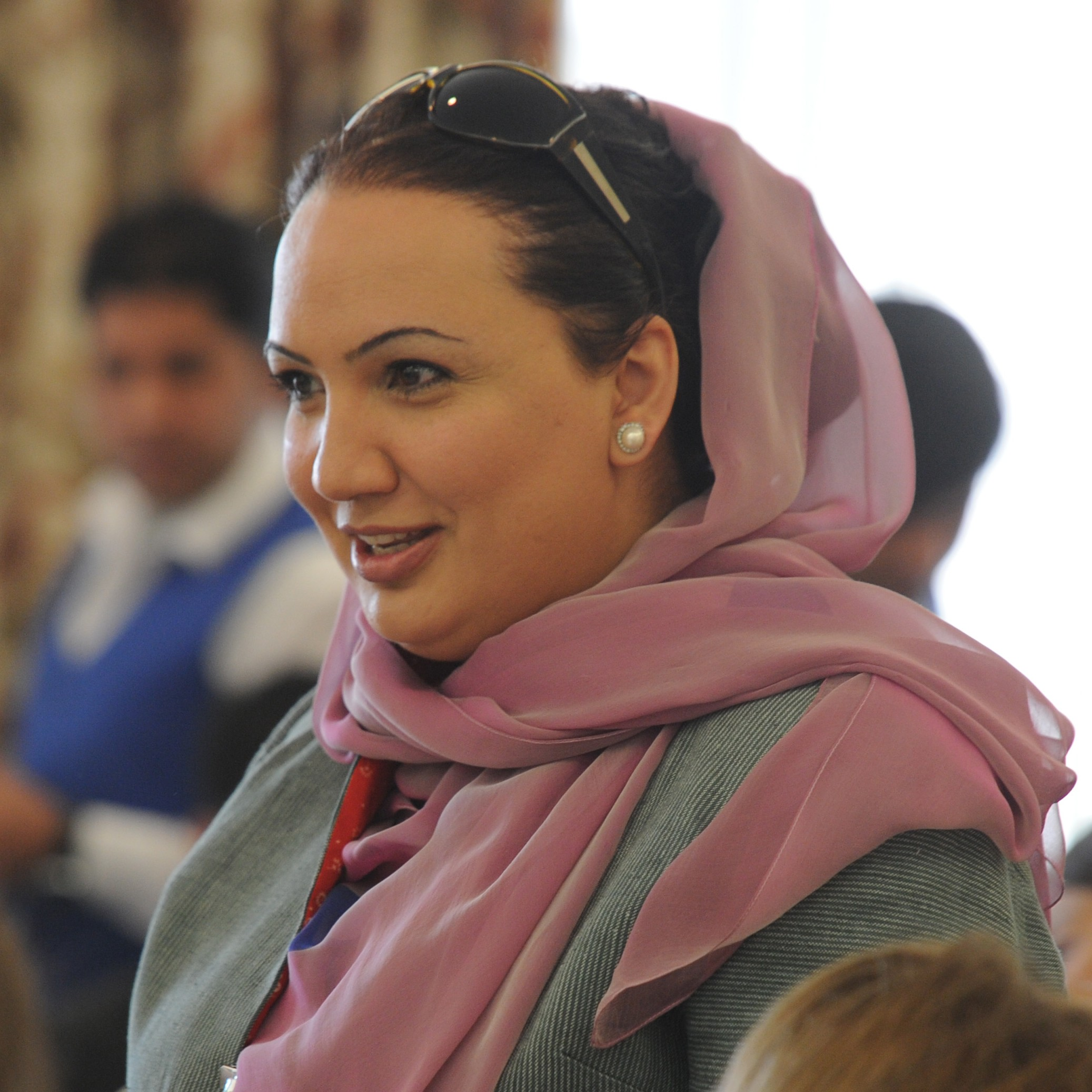
- Barakzai in March 2011
- Born: 1970 (age 55–56); Kabul, Kingdom of Afghanistan
- Occupations: Politician, ambassador
- Known for: Elected to Wolesi Jirga in 2005

Shukria Barakzai (Pashto: شکريه بارکزۍ) is an Afghan politician, journalist and Muslim feminist. She was the ambassador of Afghanistan to Norway. She is a recipient of the International Editor of the Year Award.

== Early life ==
Barakzai was born in 1970 in Kabul, Afghanistan.

Barakzai went to Kabul University in the 1990s. Halfway through a degree, she had to break off her studies because of mounting violence between the government and the Mujahideen. In September 1996 the Taliban captured Kabul. By then, many citizens, especially the educated middle classes, had left for a life in exile.

== Campaigning journalism ==
Following the fall of the Taliban regime, Barakzai capitalized on the opportunity and in 2002 Barakzai founded Aina-E-Zan (Women's Mirror), a national weekly newspaper. She campaigns on issues such as maternal and infant mortality, areas in which Afghanistan has great difficulty. (The World Health Organization (WHO) calculated that Afghanistan in 2003 had the world's highest proportion of women dying in childbirth (Maternal Mortality Ratio) at 1900 per 100 000 live births.) Barakzai states, "Child marriage, forced marriage, and violence against women are still common and accepted practices." She focuses on large issues, saying, "in my opinion the burka is not that important. What is important is education, democracy and freedom." She stresses unity among women as well as the role that men have to play.

Barakzai credits technology such as mobile phones, banned under the Taliban regime, with helping young Afghans integrate with the modern world. For example, using text messaging to vote for a participant in a television talent show contest demonstrates how democratic voting can work. She also uses her position to point out the lack of freedom of the press and the risks to journalists. (Reporters Without Borders ranks Afghanistan 156 out of 173 in its list of press freedom, and says the situation is especially difficult for women and those working in the provinces.)

== Move into politics ==
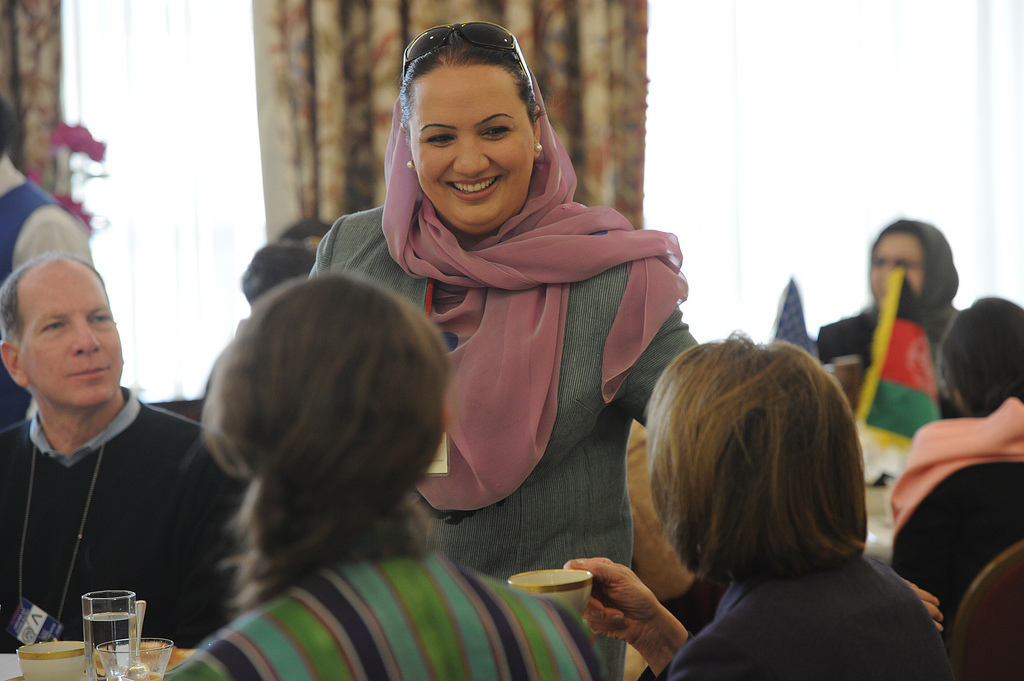
Shukria Barakzai attending a breakfast with members of U.S. Congress and Afghan Parliamentarians at the U.S. Embassy in Kabul, Afghanistan.

Barakzai was appointed a member of the 2003 loya jirga, a body of representatives from all over Afghanistan that was nominated to discuss and pass the new constitution after the fall of the Taliban. In the October 2005 elections she was elected as a member of the House of the People or Wolesi Jirga, the lower house of the National Assembly of Afghanistan. She is one of 71 women out of 249 MPs.

She is one of only a handful of female MPs who speak up for women's rights, and faces death threats for her views. Her criticisms of the legislature are wide-ranging: "Our parliament is a collection of lords. Warlords, drug lords, crime lords." She defended Malalai Joya, another female MP who has condemned warlordism, who faced abuse and threats of violence in parliament: "I was I think the only one which is I just announced that some MPs were threatening to rape her. [...] That's why after this, they kept quiet." In November 2014 she was injured in a suicide attack on a convoy in which she was travelling in Kabul. The attack killed three people and injured 17.

After the fall of Kabul in 2021 she fled from Afghanistan.

== Views ==
While expressing gratitude for "the support of the international community" in creating the conditions by 2004 in which hundreds of publications and dozens of radio stations could flourish, Barakzai condemns "the support of armed groups and outlaws, a key part of U.S. policy". Although most of her life has been spent in Kabul, she acknowledges that the capital does not truly represent the country, and refuses to blame the Taliban for all the difficulties that Afghans face: "When we talk about Afghanistan, we should discuss conditions in the entire country. In many provinces and villages, which are in very bad condition, there is no difference between the period before the Taliban regime, the time of the Taliban, and now." She opposes U.S. President Barack Obama's troop build-up plan, asking for "30,000 scholars or engineers" instead of that many soldiers. She intended to stand for President of Afghanistan in 2014, as by then she will be over 40, as the constitution requires, but did not run.

== Recognition ==
World Press Review (Worldpress.org) named Barakzai International Editor of the Year in 2004. In December 2005, she was named Woman of the Year by the BBC Radio 4 programme Woman's Hour.
