= Paul Kamara =

Sierra Leonean journalist and politician

Sierra Leone Minister of Sports
- Incumbent
- Assumed office 23 December 2010
- President: Ernest Bai Koroma
- Incumbent
- Assumed office Febr

Personal details
- Born: 12 August 1956 (age 70) Kambia, Sierra Leone
- Education: Fourah Bay College
- Profession: Journalist

Paul Kamara (born 12 August 1956) is a Sierra Leonean journalist, football manager, and cabinet minister.

== Background ==
Kamara was born on 12 August 1956 in Kambia District, Sierra Leone. He is Catholic and a former priest, and holds a Bachelor of Arts from the University of Sierra Leone. He is married to Isatu Sidratu Kamara, with whom he has three daughters.

== Journalism ==
Since 1983, Kamara has served as editor of For Di People, a Krio-language newspaper. Kamara has at times been critical of all sides in Sierra Leone's conflicts and has reportedly angered multiple political parties. The citation of the Civil Courage Prize lauded Kamara as a journalist who had "consistently crusaded against corruption and other social ills, championed press freedom, human rights and democratic values in Sierra Leone, despite continual harassment and intimidation".

As a consequence of his journalism, Kamara has been regularly threatened, attacked, and jailed. On 20 February 1996, the first day of a round of elections, Kamara was fired on by soldiers with automatic rifles and wounded in the leg, ostensibly for violating curfew. Though human rights groups have since described the incident as an "assassination attempt", no official inquiry took place. In 1999, three Revolutionary United Front (RUF) officials allegedly assaulted Kamara in the For Di People office following an article which described the "posh life" of military commanders in Freetown. On 25 September 2001, Kamara and six other journalists received anonymous death threats following their criticism of the government's decision to postpone elections. Government spokespeople denied involvement, and accused the journalists of fabricating the threats to win international sympathy.

On 12 November 2002, the Sierra Leone High Court convicted Kamara on 18 counts of criminal libel following a series of articles criticising appeals court judge Tolla Thompson's management of the Sierra Leone Football Association. He was sentenced to six months in prison and a fine of 4,500 leones (about US$2). He was freed on 11 March, but announced his intention to appeal his conviction on principle to have his conviction expunged from his record.

Kamara has won numerous international press awards for his work. In 1997, he won the London-based International Press Directory's Freedom of the Press award and in 1999, the US-based World Press Review's "International Editor of the Year Award". In 2001, he was awarded the Train Foundation's Civil Courage Prize, which recognises "extraordinary heroes of conscience" and included a cash prize of US$50,000.

== 2004 libel conviction ==
In October 2003, For Di People ran the headline "Speaker of Parliament challenge! Kabbah is a true convict!", referring to President Ahmad Tejan Kabbah's 1968 conviction for fraud and suggesting that it was unconstitutional for him to hold office. Kamara was subsequently arrested, and in 2004, was imprisoned on two charges of seditious libel. Equipment was confiscated from For Di People offices, including Kamara's car, and the newspaper was shut down for six months. On 28 July 2005, Kamara's replacement as editor, Harry Yansaneh, died from a beating reportedly ordered by a member of parliament.

BBC News described Kamara's case as sparking "wide public interest with pleas from media rights groups worldwide demanding his release". The Committee to Protect Journalists issued an appeal on Kamara's behalf, as did Reporters Without Borders.

On 30 November 2005, Kamara won an appeal against his conviction and was freed. After his release, he told reporters, "imprisonment has not broken my spirit to publish the truth or stand for the people's right to know".

== Ministerial career ==
In 1996, Kamara served one month as Secretary of State, Land, Housing and the Environment in the military government of Julius Maada Bio's National Provisional Ruling Council (NPRC). When he concluded that the generals had no intention of transitioning to democracy, however, he left the government. Shortly after, he was shot by soldiers and sought medical treatment in London, but returned a year later to oppose the military rule.

On 23 December 2010, Kamara became Sierra Leone's Minister of Employment, Youth and Sports in the cabinet of Ernest Bai Koroma. In 2011, his ministry came into conflict with Sierra Leone Football Association (SLFA) over the appointment of Swedish coach Lars-Olof Mattsson. The SLFA had pushed for Christian Cole to coach the team instead, culminating in the two coaches naming different squads for a June 2011 2012 Africa Cup of Nations qualifier. On 23 May, Kamara announced that the two sides had come to terms and that Mattison would remain the coach.

== Football ==
Kamara owns a popular football team, the Wellington People F.C. In 2000, he also briefly served as Team Manager of the national football team, the Leone Stars. During his tenure, he reportedly came into conflict with head coach Abdulai Garincha.
