= Tuzapán =

Coordinates: 20°23′6″N 97°38′0″W

Tuzapán was a postclassic Totonac site located to the south of the Cazones River, and to the southwest of Papantla. It probably was included in the Aztec Empire under the tributary province of Tochpan. Resources in the area included cacao and fruit. Tuzapan gave military aid to Moctezuma II against Tlaxcala.
