= Dick Swanson =

American photographer

Dick L. Swanson
- Born: 1934 (age 91–92); US
- Education: University of Illinois
- Known for: Photojournalism
- Spouse: Germaine Loc Swanson (m. 1969)
- Website: swansonphotography.com

Dick L. Swanson is an American photographer renowned for his work, particularly as a war photographer with numerous published photographs in the United States.

== Biography ==
=== Early life ===
Dick Swanson was born in 1934 and raised in Illinois. He worked at newspapers owned by his uncle and later became a staff photographer at the News-Gazette in Champaign, Illinois while studying at the University of Illinois.

Life magazine first published one of his photos, a Miscellany called A Bubble that has Ears, in 1957. Swanson temporarily gave up photography to become a commercial pilot. Following college, he worked for The Des Moines Register and the Davenport Democrat and he later signed a contract with New York's Black Star. Swanson worked for the Des Moines Register, where he shot "Man Alone", a photograph of a firefighter on a ladder engulfed in flames, which was recognized by the 1963 Pulitzer jury as "good on-the-spot work".

=== Vietnam ===
In 1966, Swanson went on assignment for Life to Vietnam, where he met his future wife, Germaine Loc; they married in 1969 in Vietnam and moved to the US in 1971. For his work in Vietnam, he was recognized as among the top military photographers by the project "A Day in the Life of the United States Armed Forces." Eventually Swanson became a White House photographer for Life until the magazine ended publication in 1972. Swanson stayed at the White House bureau and worked for such magazines as Fortune, People, and Time.

=== Later life ===
In April 1975, Swanson returned to Vietnam to bring his wife's family to the United States during the fall of Saigon. He took time off from photography in the late 1970s to help his wife open a Washington DC restaurant which was popular in 1979.

Around 1980, Swanson began working for National Geographic, Newsweek and The Washington Post as a freelance photographer. Currently he uses Final Cut Pro for all his work and is a producer of films for the Video Action Fund.

== Awards ==
During Swanson's career he received awards from such companies as World Press and NPPA. His work was added to the permanent collection of the Museum of Modern Art and he contributed to the Corcoran Gallery of Art's exhibition entitled "The Indelible Image" in 1986. Some of his work is in a collection at the Dolph Briscoe Center for American History, University of Texas at Austin. That collection contains over 3,000 photographs and negatives shot from 1959 - 1994. His work is also in the LIFE Image Collection owned by Getty Images.
