= Harry Yansaneh =

Sierra Leonean journalist

Harry Yansaneh (died 28 July 2005) was the acting editor for the For Di People newspaper in Freetown, Sierra Leone, who died after being beaten up by a group of men. Yansaneh accused the men of working for his landlord, Fatamata Hassan Komeh (who was a Member of Parliament for the ruling Sierra Leone People's Party), who had been trying to evict the paper from their building because their reports were critical to the government. Although Komeh and two other men were arrested after Yansaneh's death, no charges were eventually brought.

== Newspaper editor ==
Harry Yansaneh was a recent graduate of the journalism school from the University of Sierra Leone, when he became the acting editor of the newspaper For Di People. The managing editor of the newspaper, Paul Kamara, was sentenced to prison for seditious libel in October 2004.

== Attack and death ==
For Di People and five other newspapers (The African Champion, The Independent Observer, The Pioneer, The Pool, and The Progress) had rented the building at 1 Short Street in Freetown for over a decade when the landlord died and his wife, Fatamata Hassan Komeh, inherited the building Within a few months, Hassan Komeh (who was a new MP for the SLPP) began efforts to try and evict the newspapers, reportedly for publishing reports critical of the government. The efforts came to a head on 10 May 2005 when two sons of Hassan Komeh and three other men were claimed to have entered the offices of For Di People and damaged computers and other property and assaulted Yansaneh. The same day Hassan Komeh shut off the backup power for the building which prevented all of the papers from publishing issues for a number of days.

The attack left Yansaneh unconscious but he was not hospitalized. After regaining consciousness, he accused Komeh of being behind the attack and immediately filed a police report. After a week, the Sierra Leone Association of Journalists (SLAJ) filed a complaint with the Ombudsman of Sierra Leone who filed the complaint directly with the Parliament. As a result of injuries to his kidneys as a result of the attack, Yansaneh died on 28 July 2005 at a hospital in Freetown, the capital of the country.

Following his death, a second complaint from SLAJ resulted in a judicial inquest into the matter which found that Yansaneh died as a result of involuntary manslaughter. As a result of this finding, arrests were made on Hassan Komeh and two men, Olu Campbell and Reginald Bull, on 26 August 2005. Extradition requests were filed for her children Ahmed Komeh, Bai Bureh Komeh, Aminata Komeh who had traveled to the United Kingdom after the incident. All three of those arrested were released on bail soon afterward. The case largely stalled after this, the attorney general decided in 2006 not to push criminal charges, the children were not extradited, and formal charges were not brought against any of those arrested.

== Legacy ==
In honor of his efforts, the headquarters for the Sierra Leone Association of Journalists became named the Harry Yansaneh Memorial Hall.
