= World Press Review =

American news magazine

- Frequency: Monthly
- Founded: 1974
- Country: United States
- Based in: Farmingdale, New York
- Language: English
- Website: worldpress.org

World Press (Worldpress.org) is an independent, nonpartisan New York based magazine founded in 1974 and initially published by Stanley Foundation and Teri Schure, with an online edition which was launched in 1997.

The headquarters of the magazine is in Farmingdale, New York. The monthly magazine which had a circulation of 50,000 stopped publication of its print version on its 30th anniversary in April 2004 with withdrawal of Stanley Foundation and instead put its focus on the electronic version.

Worldpress.org publishes originally written articles and analysis on various world issues from environment and human rights to regional politics and armed conflicts, as well as reprinted material from the press outside the United States. The magazine describes its mission as "to foster the international exchange of perspectives and information."

According to its editorial guideline, Worldpress.org mostly focuses on the issues which are barely reflected in the mainstream press, translating, reprinting, analyzing, and contextualizing what it evaluates as "the best of the international press" from more than 20 languages. For its originally written material, World Press relies on its web of freelancers from approximately 40 countries.

According to a study carried out by Georgetown University of Washington, D.C. after the launch of the electronic version of worldpress.org in 1997, "the magazine counts among its readers all 535 members of Congress, the 9 justices of the United States Supreme Court, senior officials in the White House."

According to the study, "World Press Review is the journal of record for a small but influential global audience, providing an unprecedented platform for ideas and opinions on topics of significant international concern."

The free online magazine, run by Teri Schure, financially relies on website design and optimize projects from other independent websites, educational projects such as publishing political maps, advertisements, as well as donations.

== International Editor of the Year Award ==
Since 1975, World Press Review has also presented the International Editor of the Year Award to an editor or editors outside the United States "whose work best exemplifies the principles of journalism."

According to Worldpress.org editorial, the award is granted to journalists "in recognition of enterprise, courage and leadership in advancing the freedom and responsibility of the press, enhancing human rights and fostering excellence in journalism."

World Press Review's Editor of the Year recipient is selected by magazine's editors in consultation with its correspondents, translators, contributing editors and others. The International Editor of the Year Award in 2005-2006 was granted to three Mexican journalists, Raúl Gibb Guerrero, Dolores Guadalupe García Escamilla and Alfredo Jiménez Mota.

Other features of the Worldpress.org include information and documents on education, think tanks and NGOs, travel and dining as well as profiles on weblogs and countries. The website also provides a comprehensive directory of world newspapers and magazines.
