= For Di People =

- Type: Daily newspaper
- Founder: Paul Kamara
- Founded: 1983
- Language: Krio

For Di People is a Sierra Leonean Krio-language newspaper based in Freetown, Sierra Leone. It was founded in 1983 by Paul Kamara, who has served as its editor more or less continually since that date. Kamara and other staff have been threatened and imprisoned numerous times in the newspaper's history, most notably in a high-profile seditious libel case following a suggestion that President Ahmad Tejan Kabbah's 1968 conviction for fraud made him constitutionally ineligible for high office.

Kamara was arrested, equipment was confiscated from the newspaper offices, including Kamara's car, and the newspaper was shut down for six months. On 28 July 2005, Kamara's replacement as editor, Harry Yansaneh, died from a beating reportedly ordered by a member of parliament. BBC News described the case as sparking "wide public interest with pleas from media rights groups worldwide demanding his release". The Committee to Protect Journalists issued an appeal on Kamara's behalf, as did Reporters Without Borders.

On 30 November 2005, Kamara won an appeal against his conviction and was freed. After his release, he told reporters, "imprisonment has not broken my spirit to publish the truth or stand for the people's right to know".
