= Dolores Guadalupe García Escamilla =

Mexican crime reporter and anchorwoman and murder victim

- Born: c. 1966; Mexico
- Died: 16 August 2005 (aged 39); Nuevo Laredo, Tamaulipas, Mexico
- Cause of death: Liver failure (From gunshot wounds)
- Years active: 2001–2005
- Known for: Radio anchorwoman

Dolores Guadalupe García Escamilla (c. 1966 – 16 April 2005) was a Mexican crime reporter and anchorwoman for Punto Rojo, a radio show on XHNOE-FM radio based in Nuevo Laredo, Tamaulipas, Mexico. She had experience in a number of news platforms and was a radio personality and crime reporter since 2001.

On 5 April 2005, a lone gunman caught her by surprise outside her workplace and shot her 14 times, critically wounding her. After spending twelve days in the hospital, García Escamilla died of liver failure as a result of her injuries. The gunman was never arrested, and the motives behind her murder are unknown.

== Early life and career ==
Since 2001, García Escamilla had been a radio station personality and crime reporter for XHNOE-FM "Stereo 91" in the Mexican city of Nuevo Laredo, Tamaulipas. During her tenure at XHNOE, García Escamilla hosted a program known as Punto Rojo, where she covered topics on public safety. She also spoke about the rising drug-violence in Nuevo Laredo and denounced the corruption that besets the city.

In a possible reprisal for her work, García Escamilla's house was once shot, and, on 5 January 2005, her car was set on fire by alleged drug traffickers. She eventually presented a formal complaint to the Public Ministry office but no measures were taken.

In February 2005, García Escamilla reportedly received death threats from the radio frequencies of the Nuevo Laredo police.

== Murder ==
Nearly half an hour after broadcasting her radio show, a lone gunman surprised García Escamilla (aged 39) at the parking lot outside the radio station where she worked and shot her 14 times, hitting vital organs. (Note: The gunman shot her 14 times, but only 9 of them wounded her in the abdomen, pelvis, arms, and legs. She also suffered respiratory problems.) She was seriously wounded and was immediately taken to the nearest hospital in Nuevo Laredo to undergo surgery, but García Escamilla died twelve days later from liver failure in the morning of 16 April 2005. The attack came just less than an hour after García Escamilla had aired a report on the murder of a Mexican lawyer, Fernando Partida Castañeda, who was linked with a drug trafficking organization. The shooting of García Escamilla was also captured by a surveillance camera and has been used for the investigation.

The murder of García Escamilla occurred just a few days after the killing of Raúl Gibb Guerrero (8 April 2005), another Mexican journalist who owned a newspaper that covered information relating to Gulf Cartel and the illegal drug trade.

=== Background ===
Although most media outlets assign the initiation of the Mexican drug war on 11 December 2006, when Felipe Calderon sent in troops to put down the violence and combat drug gangs in the western state of Michoacán, others place the start of the gang wars in late 2004, during the presidency of Vicente Fox. In 2004, the city of Nuevo Laredo (where García Escamilla was killed) was living a violent turf war between the Gulf Cartel and the Sinaloa Cartel. In order to defend Nuevo Laredo from rival gang members, the Gulf Cartel hired commandos of the Mexican Armed Forces and formed a group called Los Zetas, in reference to their radio code. The Sinaloa Cartel, on the other hand, formed a group called Los Negros, and raged in battle with their rivals. Part of the reason why the homicides rose in Nuevo Laredo in 2004 is due to the fact that the Sinaloa Cartel moved into the city after the capture of the Gulf Cartel boss Osiel Cárdenas Guillén (2003) because they believed their rivals were weak. By 2005, the Mexican government flooded Nuevo Laredo with extra law enforcement personnel.

Eventually by 2007, Nuevo Laredo's peace reassumed after the Gulf Cartel ousted the Sinaloa Cartel, and after the law enforcement presence made it harder for them to operate in the city without being disrupted. Although organized crime continued in Nuevo Laredo, it had mainly "gone underground".

=== Investigation ===
Given that the lawyer and García Escamilla were killed by the same pistol – a 9 mm handgun – the Mexican authorities allege they were killed by the same assassin. That same year, several other homicides in Nuevo Laredo, Tamaulipas, were carried out by gunmen with the same weapon. In addition, the surveillance videos of the radio station captured the exact moment when the lone gunman shot García Escamilla, and managed to get a photo of him. According to eyewitnesses, the assassin was a young thin man who wore blue jeans, a shirt, and a black backpack.

No arrests have been made, and the crime is currently unsolved. It is unclear if García Escamilla's murder was in retaliation for her work or due to other motives.

== Funeral ==
With a round of applause, García Escamilla was bid farewell at the Catholic church of San Judas Tadeo in Nuevo Laredo, Tamaulipas by a number of businessmen, journalists, public workers, politicians, and family and friends of her, who attended the religious ceremony on 18 April 2005. After the ceremony, reporters, journalists, photographers, and caricaturists went to the downtown Nuevo Laredo and gave a minute of silence at the city's plaza (directly in front of the city hall) as a sign of respect for García Escamilla's death and as a symbolic protest for press freedom.

To fulfill the last wish of García Escamilla, her body was cremated, made into ashes, and given to her mother Beatriz Escamilla, brother, and son.

== Organized crime allegations ==
After García Escamilla was murdered, a number of media outlets speculated that she was involved with a drug trafficking organization based in Nuevo Laredo. Several sources indicated that she received bribes and collaborated with the Gulf Cartel by handing out drug money to other journalists to silence the press. The Committee to Protect Journalists believes, however, that the evidences presented for these claims are "inconclusive."

=== Video confessions ===
The Dallas Morning News received a video from an anonymous user in December 2005 filming four alleged drug traffickers of the Gulf Cartel and Los Zetas, with clear signs of torture, confessing their involvement in the murder of García Escamilla. In the video, the victims are shown sitting down on the floor inside a room with their hands tied and with a black plastic bag as a background curtain. After six minutes of confessing how their criminal organization works and how they get rid of their enemies, a man in the background pulls out a 9 mm pistol and shoots one of the victims in the head, killing him instantly. In the edited version found on the web, the video cuts right before the man with the pistol pulls the trigger on the victim's head.

One of the victims confessed in the video that García Escamilla was under the payroll of the Gulf Cartel to reportedly maintain control and censor the information relating to drug trafficking. "She did not want to work for us anymore, so to make sure she wouldn't talk, they gave orders to kill her," the victim said.

== See also ==
- Mexican drug war
- List of journalists killed in Mexico
