= Papantla =

- City and municipality
- Papantla de Olarte
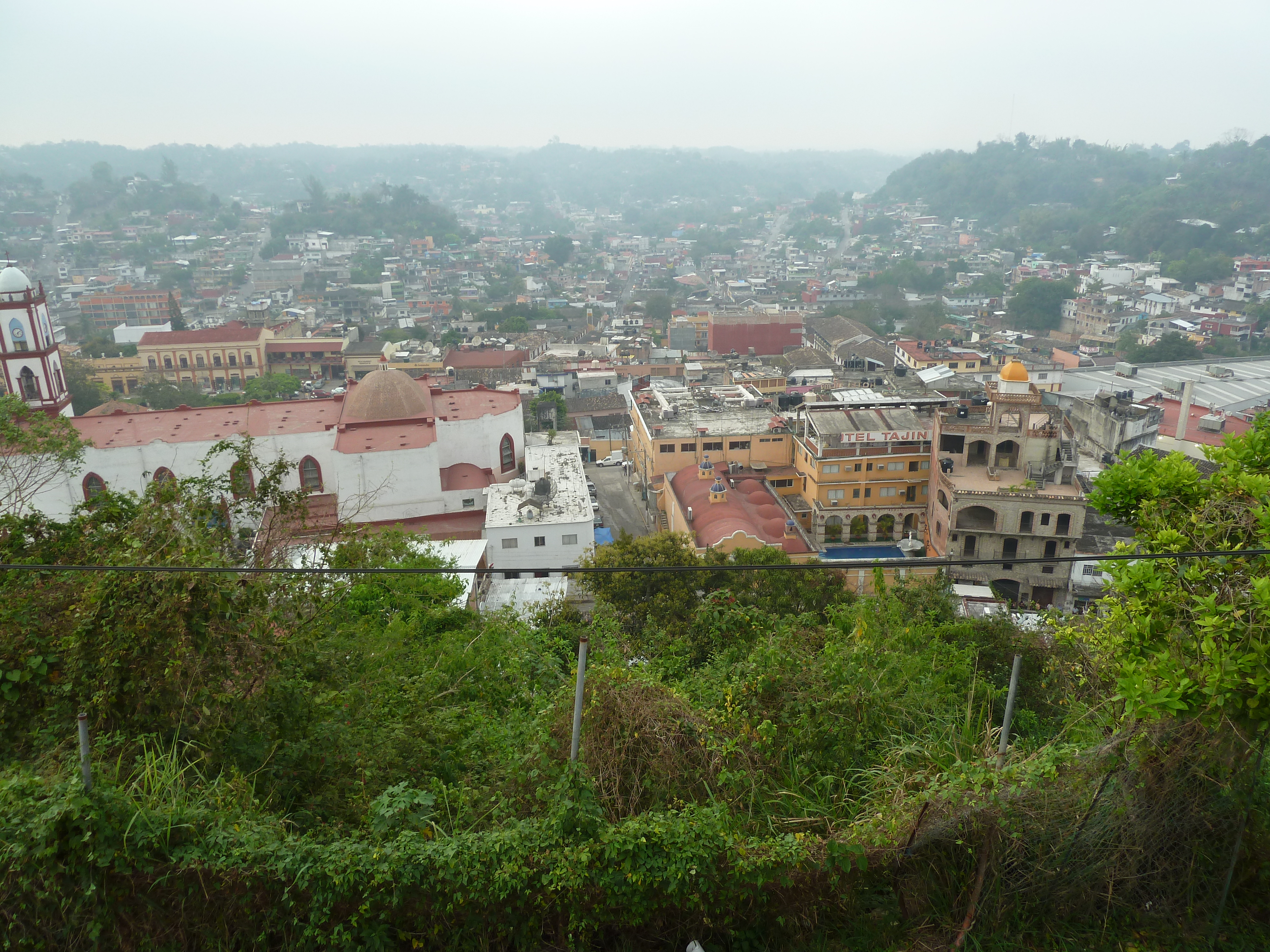
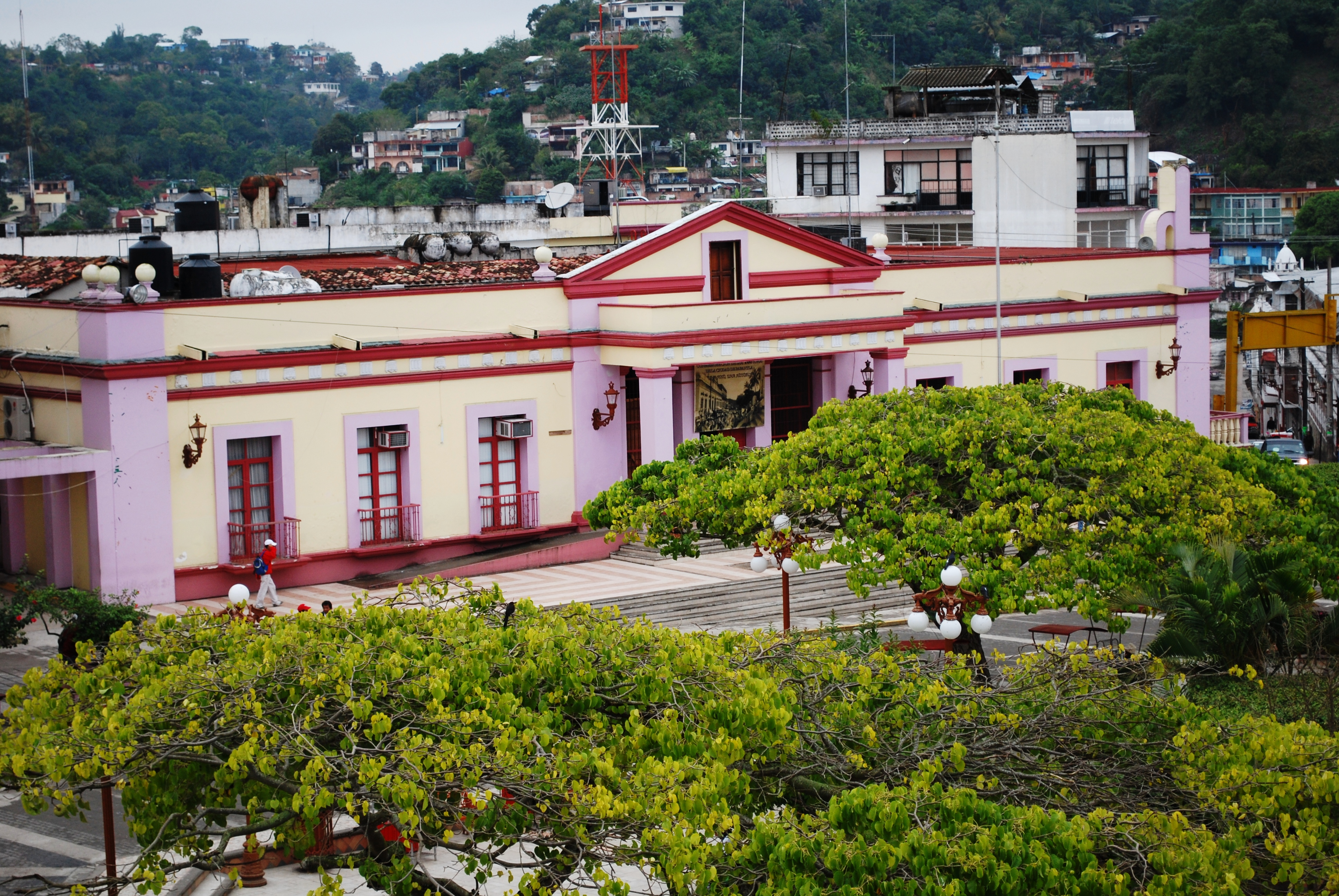
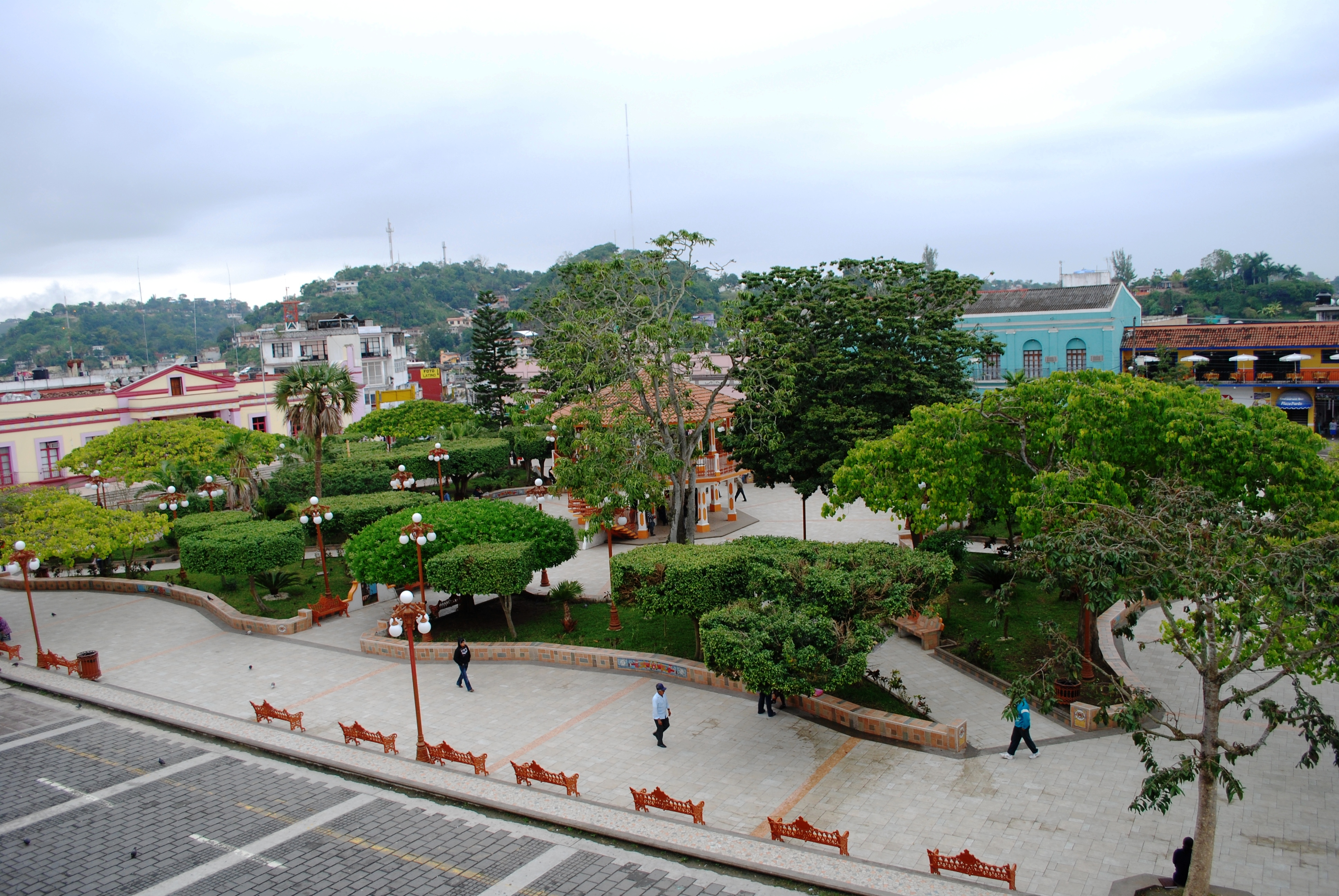
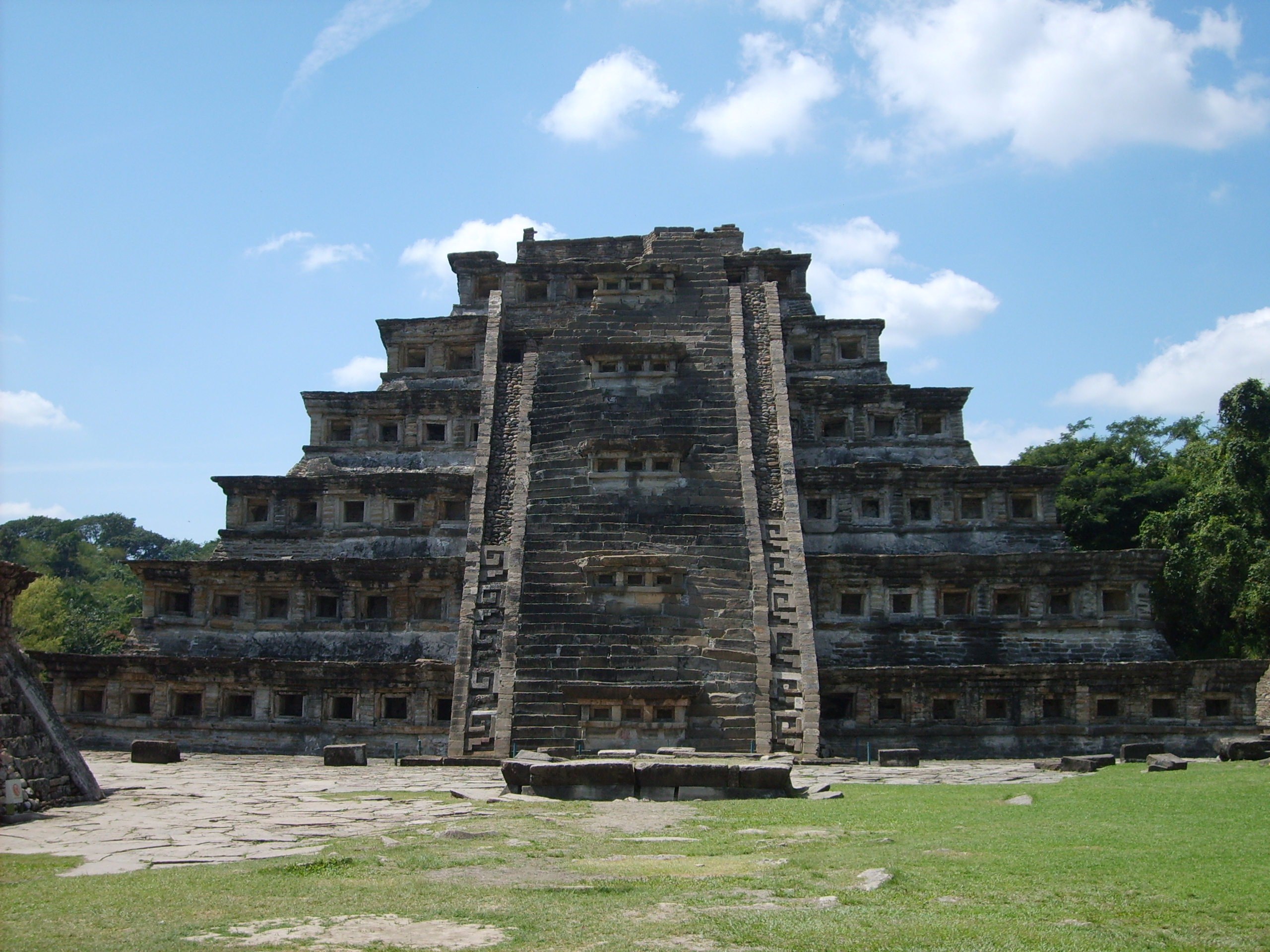
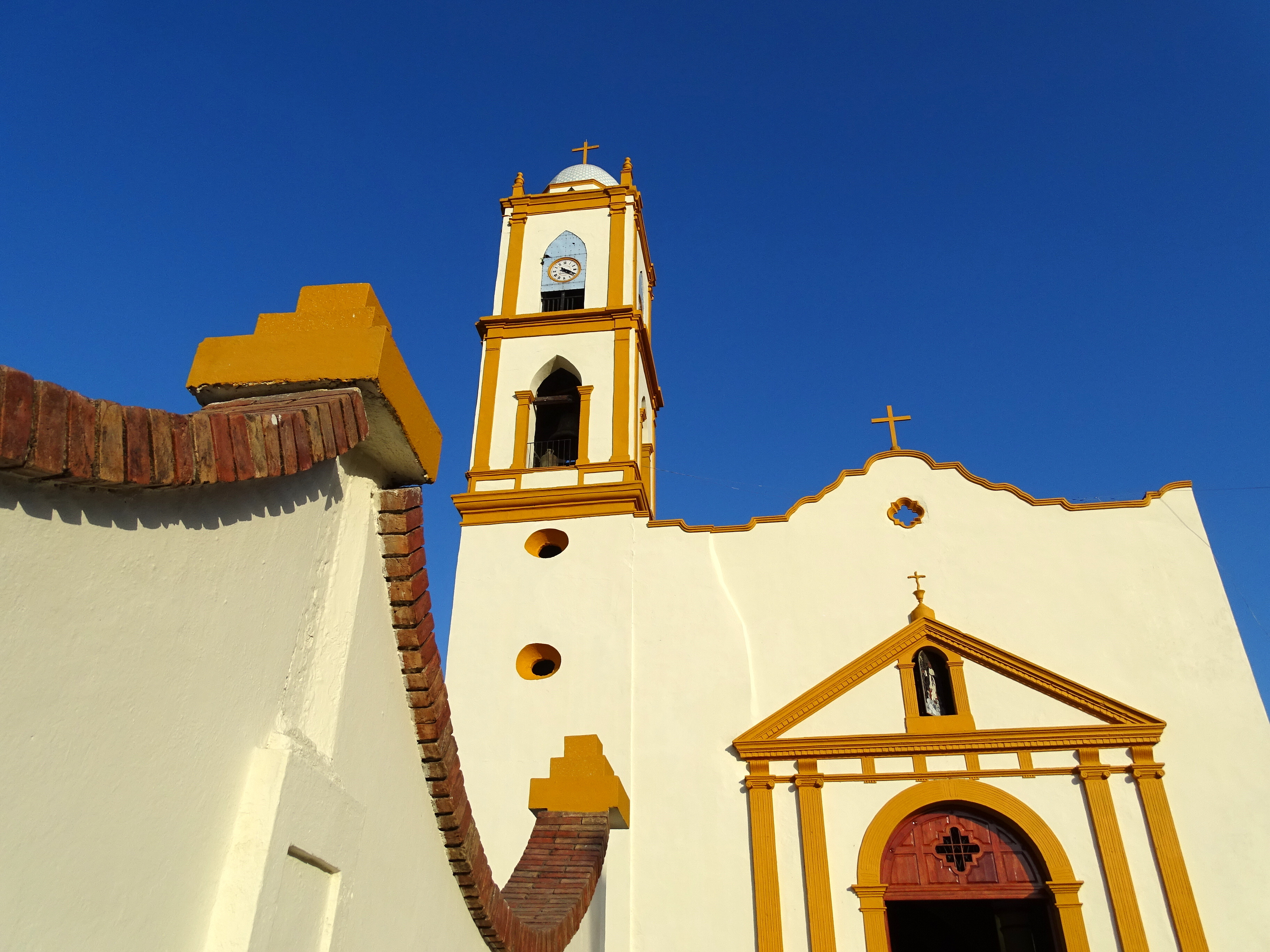
- Top: Panoramic view of Papantla's Downtown; Middle: Papantla Municipal Hall, Main Plaza; Bottom: El Tajín Archaeological Zone, Our Lady of the Assumption Church

- Coat of arms

- Location within Veracruz Location within Mexico
- Coordinates: 20°26′52″N 97°19′12″W
- Country: Mexico
- State: Veracruz
- Region: Totonaca Region
- Founded: 13th century
- Municipal Status: 1880

Government
  - Mayor: Yamir de Jesús de la Cruz Patiño (MORENA)

Area
  - Municipality: 1,458.5 km^{2} (563.1 sq mi)
- Elevation (of seat): 180 m (590 ft)

Population (2020)
  - Municipality: 159,910
  - Density: 109.6/km^{2} (284/sq mi)
  - Seat: 55,452
- Time zone: UTC-6 (Central (US Central))
- Postal code (of seat): 93400
- Demonym: papanteco

Papantla (Spanish: [paˈpantla]) is a city and municipality located in the north of the Mexican state of Veracruz, in the Sierra Papanteca range and on the Gulf of Mexico. The city was founded in the 13th century by the Totonacs and has dominated the Totonacapan region of the state since then. The region is famed for vanilla, which occurs naturally in this region, the Danza de los Voladores and the El Tajín archeological site, which was named a World Heritage Site. Papantla still has strong communities of Totonacs who maintain the culture and language. The city contains a number of large scale murals and sculptures done by native artist Teodoro Cano García, which honor the Totonac culture. The name Papantla is from Nahuatl and most often interpreted to mean "place of the papanes" (a species of crow). This meaning is reflected in the municipality's coat of arms.

== History ==
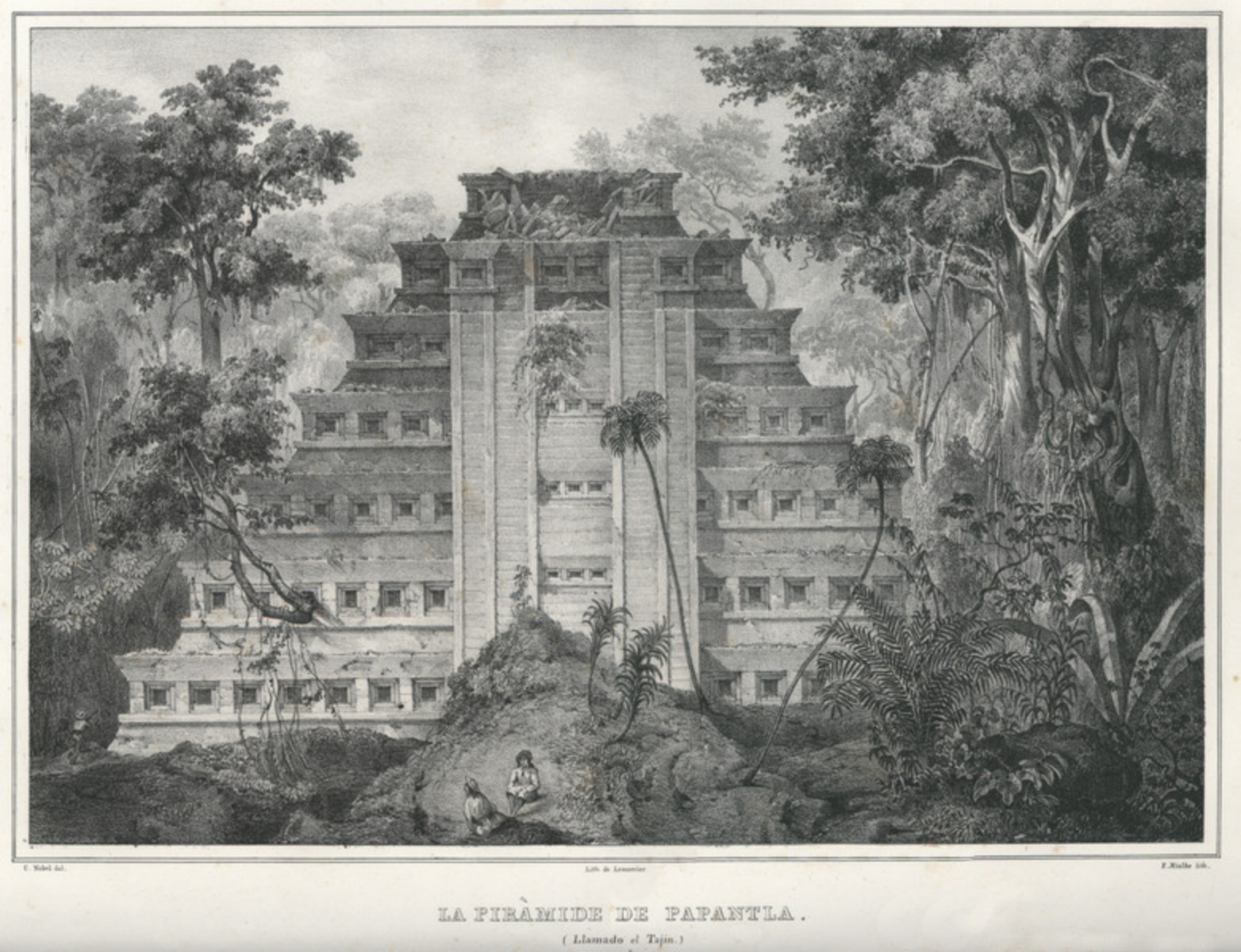
Pyramid at Papantla ca. 1836 by Carl Nebel

The area in which Papantla is found has been dominated by a number of pre-Hispanic cultures. The first known is that of the Olmec, with the Huastecs coming afterward. Evidence of these cultures can be found at nearby archeological sites such as Cempoala, El Tajin, San Lorenzo and Tres Zapotes. The settlement was founded around 1200, by various groups of Totonacs, some of whom migrated here after being pushed south by the Chichimecas and other groups coming from the fallen city of El Tajín. During the rest of the pre-Hispanic period the site belonged to the Pueblos del Totonacapan, dominated by Tuzapan. Besides vanilla, local resources included cedars, chicle, fruits, birds, fish, wild game, cotton, cacao and honey. There may have been a Nahua minority in the vicinity. Moctezuma II conquered Papantla and incorporated it into the Aztec Empire under the tributary province of Tochpan, and Papantla offered mantas, chilies and maize as tribute.

Soon after the Spanish conquest of the Aztec Empire, the Spanish quickly realized the value of the vanilla bean, which is native to this area. The Totonac town was refounded as Papantla de Santa María de la Asunción with Spanish families moving in. Soon after, vanilla was being sent to European markets. It was made the seat of the region called Totonacapan, which encompassed the modern municipalities of Cazones, Coatzintla, Coyutla, Espinal, Coxquihui, Chumatlan, Filomeno Mata, Gutiérrez Zamora, Mecatlán, Poza Rica, Progreso de Zaragoza, Tecolutla, and Zozocolco de Hidalgo.

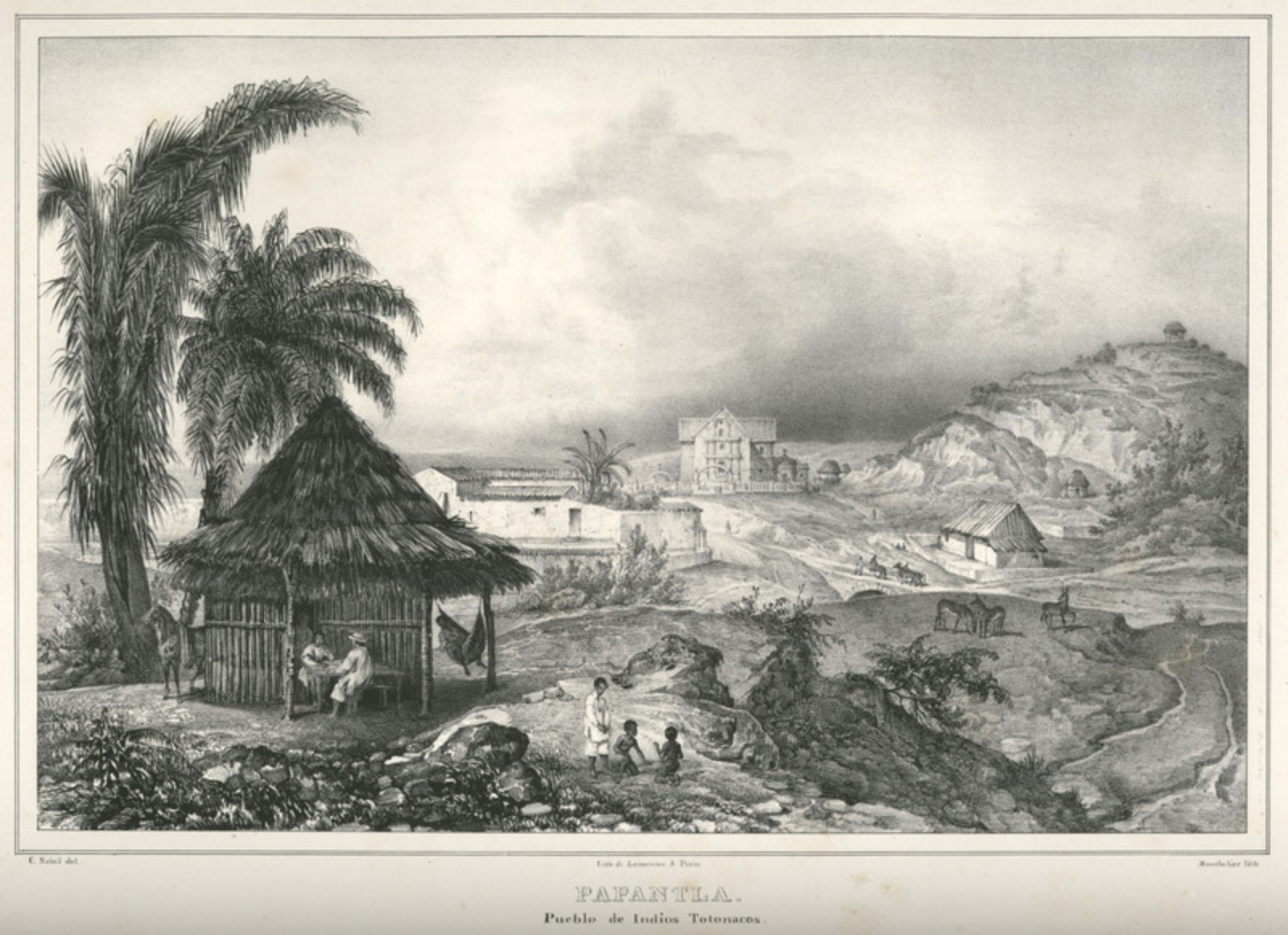
Papantla ca. 1836 by Carl Nebel

In 1785, the nearby ruins of the pre-Hispanic city of El Tajín were accidentally discovered by Spaniard Diego Ruiz, while he was looking for clandestine plantings of tobacco. This site became famous around the world soon after due to the writings of Alexander von Humboldt and others. During the Mexican War of Independence, Serafin Olarte and his guerrillas actively fought in the area from 1813 to 1820, until Olarte was captured by royalist forces and executed. The municipality was created in 1880 by decree. In 1910, the settlement gained city status with the name of Papantla de Hidalgo. The official name was changed to Papantla de Olarte, in honor of Serafin Olarte. As during the War of Independence, indigenous peoples of the area rebelled against the regime of Porfirio Díaz in the late 1890s, just prior to the Mexican Revolution. A number of clashes were also fought here during that war. During this period, land reforms led to significant conflicts over property rights, as Indigenous Totonac communities resisted the privatization of communal lands. Historian Elimilo Kouri argues in his book that these reforms benefited local elites and state officials, leading many indigenous people to organize legal and communal strategies to reclaim their lands. Some Indigenous leaders leveraged public land laws to contest poorly measured or unaccounted for properties, sparking further tensions with powerful land owners. Other Totonacs saw land privatization as an opportunity to grow their own stakes in the booming vanilla business, so they sided with the government in hopes of receiving more land. These disputes deepened social inequality and led to resistance movements. The unrest surrounding land dispossession and the disconnect with the Diaz regime contributed to the revolutionary struggles that erupted during the 20th century.

The late 19th century was a period of profound transformation for Papantla, as the Mexican government under Porfirio Díaz pushed for the privatization of communal lands, to promote modernization and increase tax revenues. This process, however, sparked fierce resistance from the Totonac people, who saw their ancestral lands being divided and sold to merchants and elites. As one group of dissidents wrote, "We do not want the division to happen, because the water springs are not just anywhere, and people prefer to live near where they are found." The resulting conflicts, including the 1891 uprising, foreshadowed the broader social unrest that would erupt during the Mexican Revolution, as rural communities across Mexico fought for land reform and justice.

In 1922, the city of Papantla became the seat of the Diocese of Papantla when it was created from territories that had belonged to the Dioceses of Veracruz and Tampico.

One of the most famous people to come from Papantla is artist Teodoro Cano Garcia, who was a disciple of Diego Rivera. During much of the 20th century, this artist worked to promote Papantla's native Totonac heritage. He is responsible for most of the sculptures and other public art works that can be seen in the town today. Some of these include the "Evolution of the Totonac Culture" mural on the side of the main church, the "History of Papantla" mural which is on the side of the Chapel of Cristo Rey and the Monumento del Volador, a giant statue which is on a hill in the center of the city.

The city was nominated to become a Pueblo Mágico in 2006. However, the process was temporarily suspended. Problems to be resolved included the large number of street peddlers, the need to bury telephone and electrical lines and the need to paint many of the houses in the historic center. In 2012, Papantla officially became a Pueblo Mágico.

== The city ==
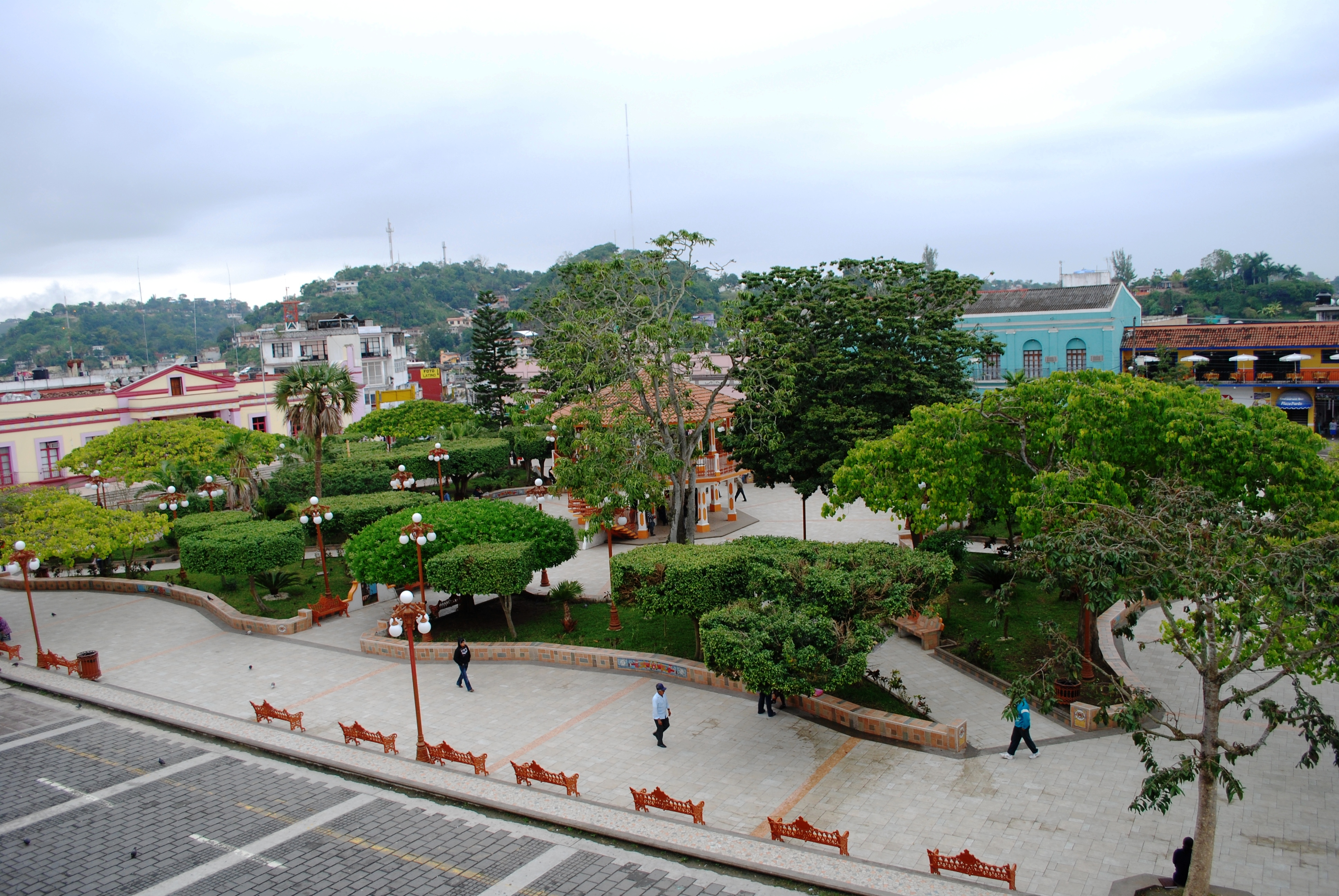
Main plaza or park of Papantla

Papantla is the heart of the Totonacapan region. When the Spanish refounded the town, they laid it out in Spanish style with a central plaza surrounded by the most important buildings, such as the main church and the main government building. The Municipal Palace still faces the main plaza, marked by the classic-style pediment over the main entrance. This building contains two murals: one about the Totonacs by Teodoro Cano Garcia and the other by Xolotl Martinez Hurtado de Mendoza. The construction of the building dates from 1810 although it was destroyed by forces associated with Pancho Villa in 1915. The building was reconstructed in 1929, with remodeling done in 1979 and 1999. The plaza is officially named the Israel C. Téllez Park, which contains grass and a number of trees. In this plaza are weekend events such as the Danzón Fridays as well as live music on Saturday and cultural events on Sundays. On the underside of the kiosk is a mural by Teodoro Cano Garcia which depicts the indigenous concept of creation, as a world with four suns.

The Church of Nuestra Señora de la Asunción was constructed between 1570 and 1590 by the Franciscans. Originally, the church did not have a bell tower as the bell was located on the nearby hill which is now the located of the Monument al Volador. The bell tower was built in 1875, and the clock which is there was installed in 1895. The church is in the form of a Latin cross and has an entrance flanked by Roman style pilasters. Across from the main facade are the principal markets, called Hidalgo and Juarez. On the atrium wall is a sculpted mural by Teodoro Cano Garcia which depicts the evolution of Totonac culture superimposed on the body of the god Quetzalcoatl.

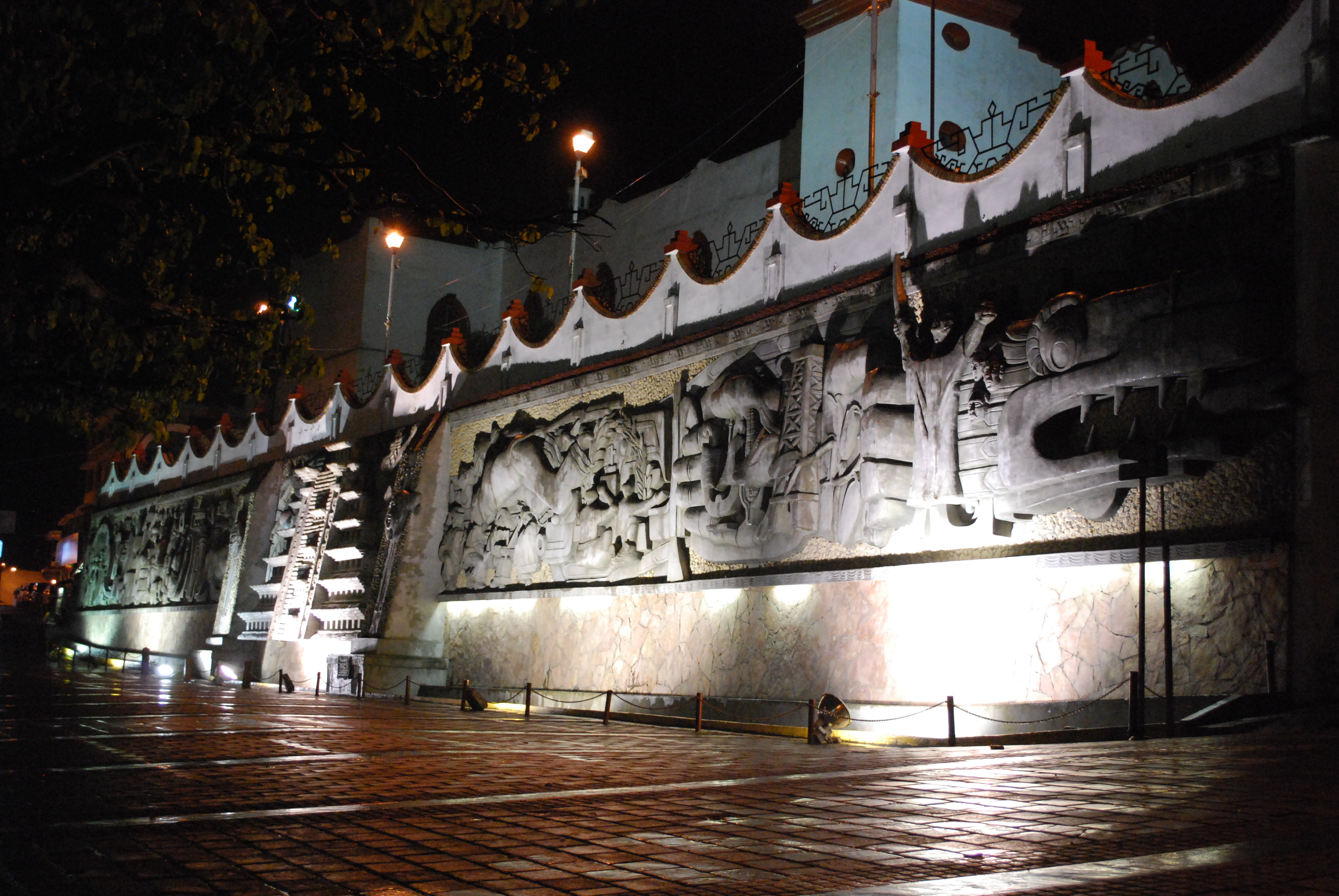
Evolution of the Totonac culture by Teodoro Cano Garcia

The city has a total of eleven murals on public buildings as well as private houses. The Fernando Gutierrez Barrios Auditorim has a high relief mural depicting sports in the Totonacapan region. The Chapel of Cristo Rey is located on Madero Street and is modeled after the Cathedral of Notre Dame in Paris. It contains a mural by Cano about the history of the city of Papantla. In addition to the murals, the Monument to the Voladores is located on a hill in the center of the city. This hill also serves as a scenic lookout and contains a mural which narrates the ceremony from the cutting of the tree to the execution of the descent.

The city is home to the Universidad Pedagógica Veracruzana, as well as a number of museums. The Museo de la Ciudad is located on Pino Suárez Street and contains exhibits from the pre-Hispanic, colonial and post-Independence periods. The Museo de las Mascaras contains a collection of over 300 masks from Totonacapan and other parts of Mexico, located in the community of San Pablo. It was founded by Simon Gomez Atzin who collected masks and ceremonial dress for many years. The Teodoro Cano Garcia Museum contains works by this artist as well as some of his protégés. It also contains archeological pieces and elements of Totonac culture such as dress. Other museums include the Museos del Totonacapan and the Casa de Cultura's permanent collection of paintings and sculpture.

Regional specialties include frijoles in alchuchut, tashuayahun and zacahuil.

== Celebrations and dances ==
On December 7, there is a tradition called the "Dia del Niño Perdido" (Day of the Lost Child). On this day, lighted candles are placed on doorjambs and windowsills. However, the major festival for this city is the feast of Corpus Christi, which features processions, and indigenous dances such as the tocotines, guaguas, negritos, Santiagueros and voladores. The first feast of Corpus Christi was celebrated in Papantla sometime between 1550 and 1560, sponsored by the encomendero of the area, Placido Perez. Until very recently, the celebration was strictly religious with processions and liturgy. In 1957, a more secular event called the Festival of Corpus Christi was added to run concurrently with the religious rites. In that year, a livestock, agriculture, industrial and cultural fair was added. In 1958, the celebration of "Juegos Florales" (flower arrangements) and the Festival Xanath began to distinguish the event from others in the area. The Xanath Festival was begun by Mariano Torres Carreño and Hector Ventura de Castro with the aim of presenting Totonac culture to the city and make the residents proud of their heritage. The festival has indigenous art exhibits, traditional dance, costumes and music. The dances are choreographed into a single spectacle which is reworked each year.

Like the rest of Mexico, Papantla celebrates Day of the Dead but has some local variations. "Ofrendas" (altars to the dead) can be set up on tables or on board which are suspended from the ceiling. The altar is called a pachau and the lack on one in the home can bring on social rejection for violating community norms. These are decorated with palm fronds, bananas, oranges, limes, anis and chocolate figures. Food stuffs include mole, candy, tamales, local breads and other regional specialties. A glass of water and "renio" (a type of local alcohol) are also placed. Day of the Dead celebrations begin on 31 October for those who had died of natural causes. On 1 November, the souls of deceased children (called Laqsq'at'an) are welcomed. Later on 1 November and 2 November the souls of adults are said to return. It is believed that the souls come in the form of insects to eat the meals laid out in offering. It is also believed that this food needs to be freshly prepared and hot. During the nights, groups of living children go house to house singing traditional songs.

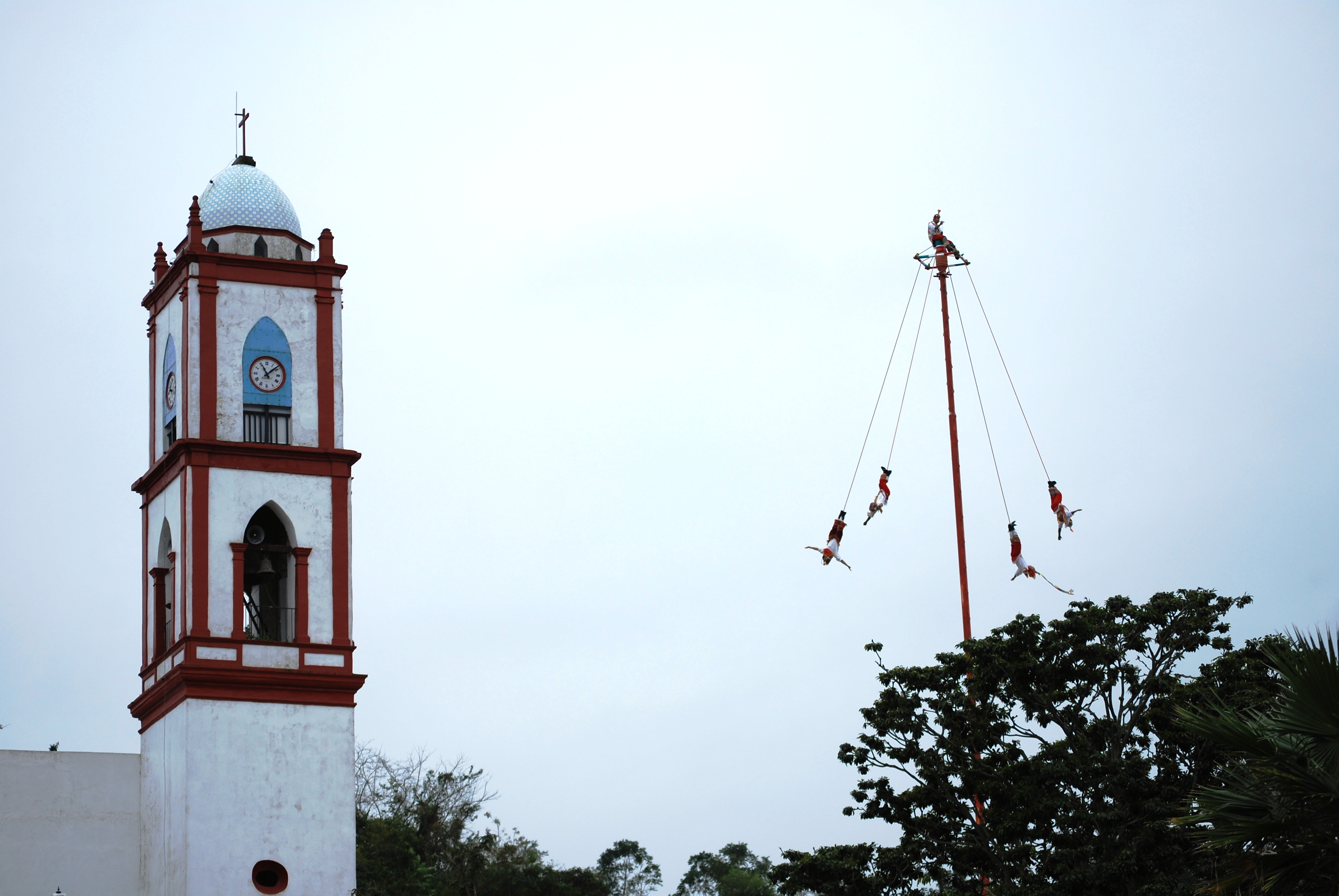
Voladores at the Church of the Assumption

For religious and secular events, two dances are definitive of Papantla. According to Totonac myth, the gods told men "Dance, and we shall observe." The Danza de los Voladores is one of these events that was originally meant to please the gods. The ceremony involves five participants who climb a thirty-meter pole. Four of these tie ropes around their waists and wind the other end around the top of the pole in order to descend to the ground. Each rope is wound around the top of the pole thirteen times, which by four equal 52 and corresponds to the Mesoamerican ritual calendar. The fifth participant stays at the top of the pole, playing a flute and a small drum. The flute represents birdsong and the drum the voice of the gods. The four who descend or "flying men" represent the four cardinal directions. The flautist begins by honoring the east, from which life is believed to have originated. This dance or ceremony has been inscribed as a Masterpiece of the Oral and Intangible Heritage of Humanity by UNESCO.

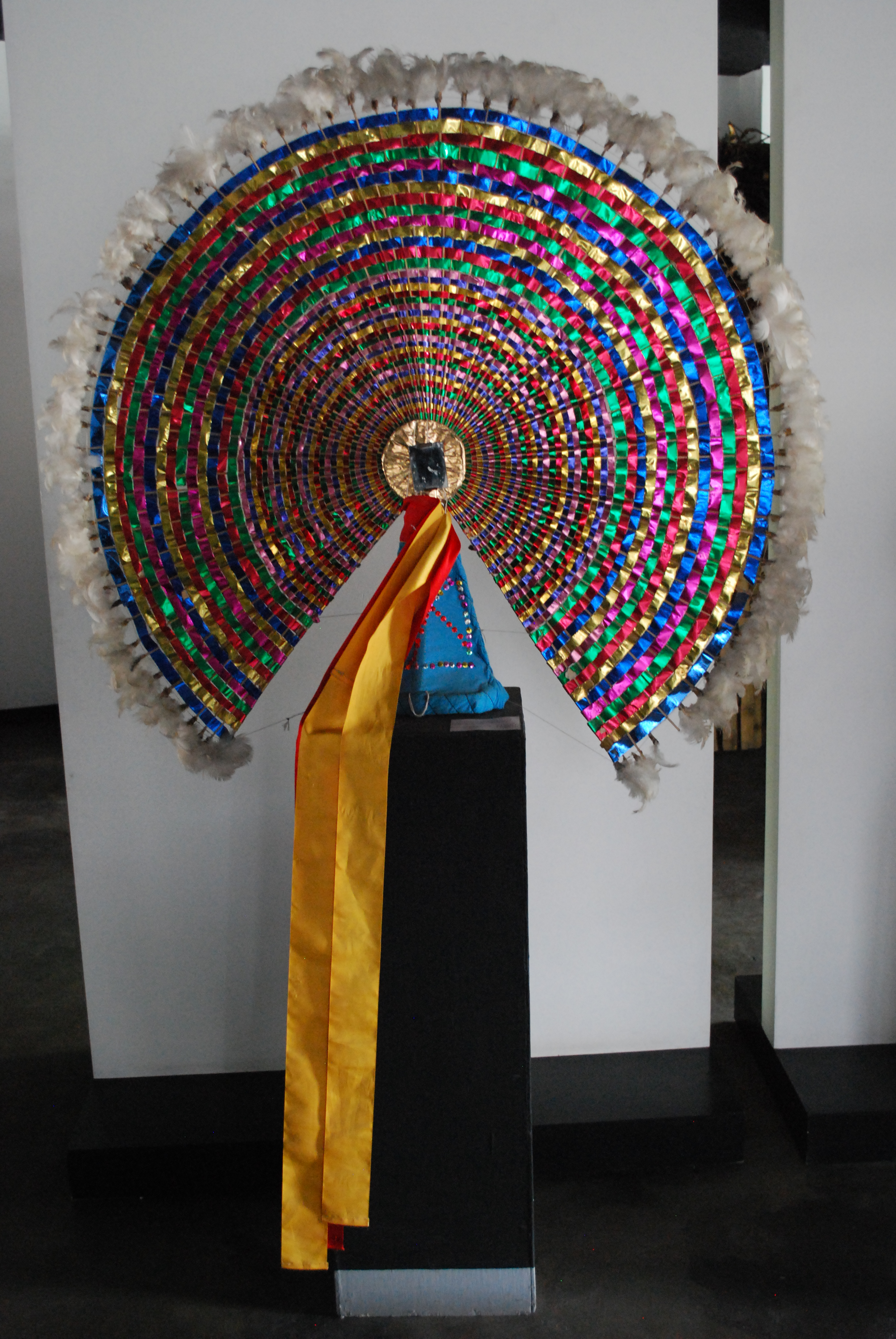
Headdress for the Dance of the Guaguas

The Dance of the Guaguas (also spelled Huahuas) is mostly performed by Totonacs but also by some groups of Nahuas and Huastecs who live in this area. It is a variant of the Dance of the Quetzales. The dance represents a survival of beliefs based on agricultural and the solar year. One essential element of the dance is the construction of a wooden cross which turns in a vertical position, representing the basis of creation and the genesis of cosmic life. Dancers dress in red pants, which have been elaborately embroidered, white shirts and a decorated cloth that goes across the chest. But the most distinctive apparel is the headdress, which is a large circle of woven ribbons with loose ends hanging around down the back. The dance movements involve the stomping with the boots that dancers wear.

== Vanilla ==
Papantla is the heart of Mexico's vanilla-growing region called Totonacapan, and the spice has been grown and traded here since pre-Hispanic times. According to legend, the Totonacs have lived and grown vanilla since they came to this area after the downfall of Teotihuacan. Initially, the Totonacs gathered vanilla from wild orchids in the forests, but by the late 18th century, they began cultivating it in small plots, incorporating the crop into their traditional agricultural systems. This shift allowed them to increase production and participate in the growing vanilla trade while maintaining their economic autonomy. The system that emerged from these communal land holdings is known as the condueñazgo, where each participant owned a share of the total plot of land and the profit produced therein. By the 19th century, Papantla had become Mexico's leading vanilla-producing region, with much of its crop exported to Europe and later the United States. Unlike many other cash crops, vanilla did not require extensive land clearing or disrupt Totonac subsistence farming, instead providing an important supplementary income that was used for household needs, religious ceremonies, and community obligations. Further, vanilla's unique growability in the region left the Paplanta lower class completely dependent on the crop, further antagonizing the tensions that rose from pushes for privatization that lead to a starker contrast between classes.

The origin of the plant is said to have come from the death of two young lovers. The young woman, Tzacopantziza, was the daughter of a king named Tenitztli. She was so beautiful that her father consecrated her to the goddess Tonacayohua so that no mortal man may have her. However, a young prince by the name of Zkatan-Oxga, kidnapped her. This angered the gods and send a monster to terrify the people. The priests found the couple hiding in the mountains and decapitated them both. Where their blood spilled, a plant began to grow, which soon began to give the people their fragrant flowers and seed pods.

True vanilla comes from a seed pod of an orchid called Vanilla planifolia. This plant grows as a vine on host trees in this area, though the species ranges as far south as Brazil. The pods are green when harvested, and turn black when dried. In the Totonac language, vanilla is called Xanath and is used to make a liquor which is almost never seen outside of the Papantla area. These people have used vanilla for centuries as a flavoring, a perfume and as medicine. In the early colonial period, the Spanish quickly exported vanilla to Europe and a number of cultivators became wealthy. The name "vanilla" comes from the Spanish "vainilla" which means little seed pod. The growing of vanilla remained a monopoly in Mexico until the French began their vanilla endeavor on the island of Réunion. Here, the technique of hand pollination was developed that allowed the French to continue their cultivation of vanilla, thus giving them access to the vanilla demands of the European continent. Even though French vanilla did become a competitor, Papantla's continued vanilla cultivation ultimately remained constant and never went out of business. The United States was also a major consumer of Papantla's vanilla beans. After surpassing the French in consumption the United States was able to start setting the market prices instead of letting the cultivators in Papantla do that. That led to a dramatic decrease in vanilla prices resulting in strict land reform movements that left many farmers at risk of not making a profit while no longer holding on to their land, as new title owners began creating unfair agreements with the farmers. As vanilla prices dropped, land disputes became more intense. Many Totonac farmers were pushed off communal lands. These tensions led to legal battles and resistance movements, with some indigenous leaders using public land laws to challenge unfair land seizures.

However, vanilla transformed Papantla's economy during the late 19th century, bridging the gap between Spanish, Italian, and mestizo merchants and Totonac farmers, though both groups had different visions for its impact. While local elites saw vanilla as a path to modernization - fueling trade, infrastructure, and economic expansion - Totonac farmers valued it as a means of preserving their independence and traditional milpa-based economy. Despite this growing divergence, Papantla's social structure remained rooted in communal land ownership, with most of the population still relying on subsistence farming. Internal tensions also persisted within the Totonac community over governance, commerce, and taxation, exacerbating existing social divides. The transition from Spanish rule to republican governance further disrupted Papantla's Indigenous institutions, but unlike other regions, local Indigenous communities adapted to these changes rather than resisting them.

Outside of Papantla, real vanilla is difficult to find in Mexico because of its cost. Within the Papantla area, elaborate figures, such as animals are made with the pods. The Xanath Festival, which is held concurrently with Corpus Christi, also honors vanilla. In addition, Papantla holds a Vanilla Expo in December.

== The municipality ==
Historical population
Year	Pop.	±%
1995	171,167	—
2000	170,304	−0.5%
2005	152,863	−10.2%
2010	158,599	+3.8%
2015	161,097	+1.6%
2020	159,910	−0.7%

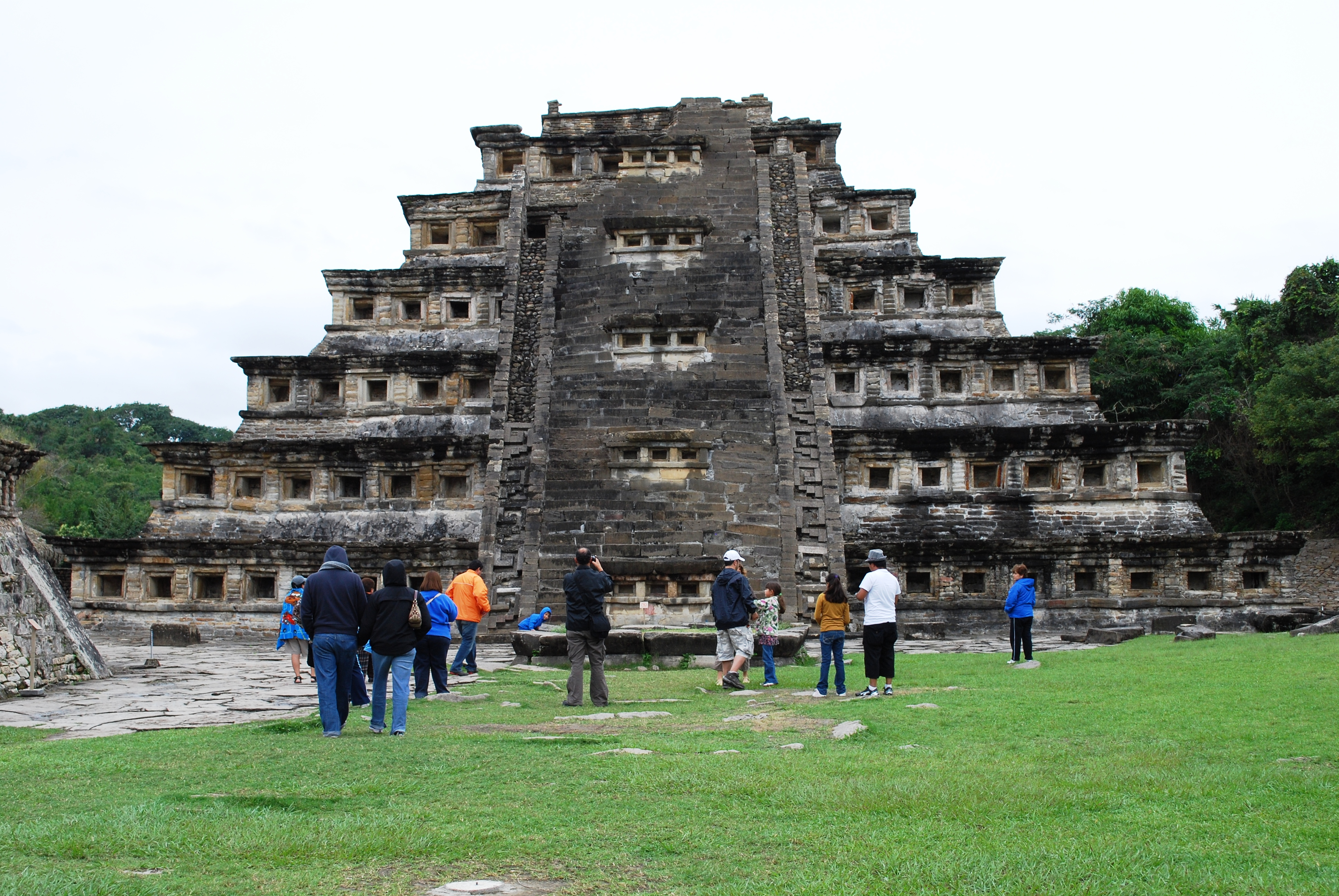
Pyramid of the Niches in El Tajín

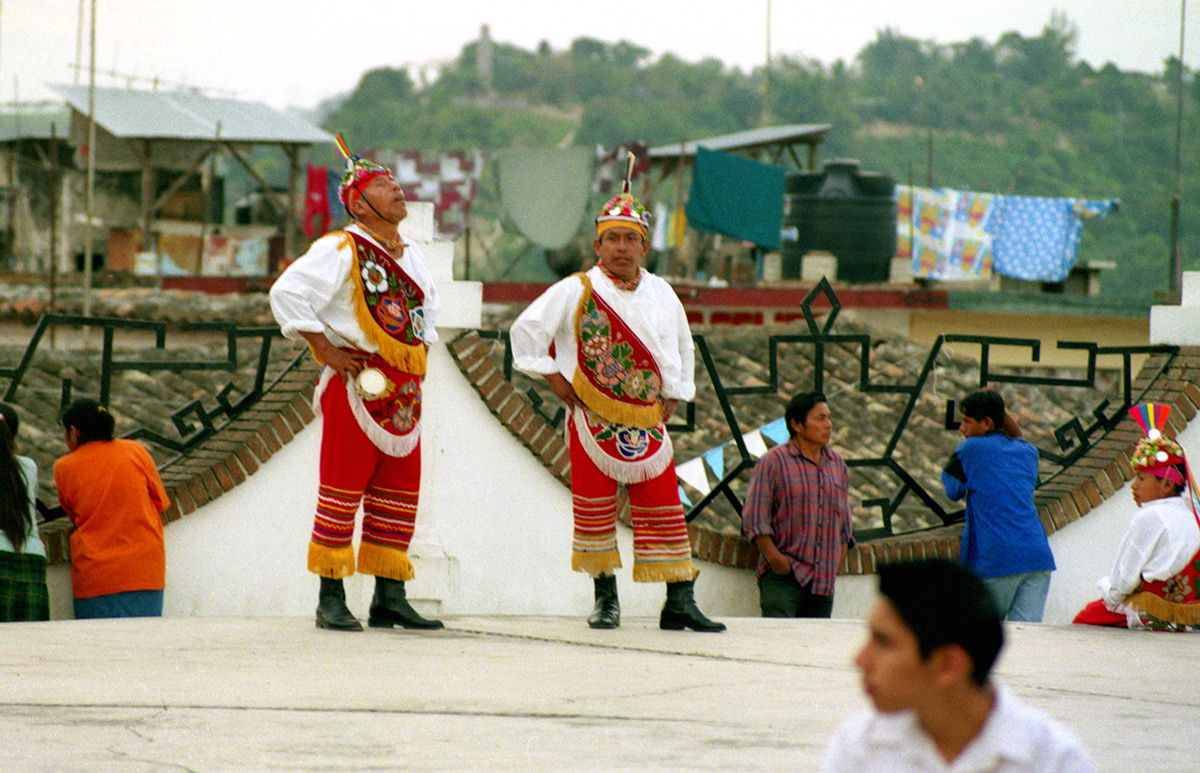
Voladores after a performance

The city of Papantla is the governing authority for over 337 other named communities which cover a territory of 1,458.5 km^{2}. About a third of the municipality's population of 159,910 (2020) live in the city proper. The city and municipality still has strong communities of Totonacs, with about 25% of the municipality's population speaking an indigenous language. The overwhelming majority identify themselves as Catholic but about ten percent are evangelical Christian. Papantla borders the municipalities of Cazones de Herrera, Tecolutla, Gutiérrez Zamora, Martínez de la Torre, Espinal, Coatzintla, Tihuatlán and Poza Rica as well the state of Puebla to the south and the Gulf of Mexico to the east. The municipality is located in the Sierra Papanteca, which is a series of low mountains with numerous valleys. The most notable peaks are the La Jarana, Pelón, El campanario, La Palma, De la Cruz, Del Jazmín, del Grillo, de Dolores and Del Clavel. Small rivers which feed into the Tecolutla, and Texistepec Rivers pass through here, such as the Tlahuanapa, Santa Agueda and the Poza Verde. The area is heavily forested with subtropical perennial foliage with trees such as the heliocarpus, laurel, cedar and ceiba. It contains 17 km of mostly virgin beaches. The coastline includes the Boquila Estuary, Playa Chichinit, Rancho Playa, Playa Olmo, Tenixtepec and Boca de Lima. Most of the animal life consists of small mammals such as rabbits, raccoons and coyotes along with various species of birds and snakes. The area is considered to be tropical rainforest with most rain falling between May and August. September and October are notable for the occasional hurricane.

About 75% of the municipality's land is dedicated to agriculture and pasture, with about 47% of the municipality's population dedicated to it, as well as crafts. Main crops include corn, beans, chili peppers and oranges. Livestock raised here includes cattle, pigs, sheep and horses. There is some logging done. There is some industry here, much of which is the packing and shipping of oranges. Tourism is becoming an important part of the economy, based on the area's archeological sites, beaches and traditions, especially the Danza de los Voladores.

The El Tajín archeological zone was one of the major cities of ancient Mesoamerica which existed between 800 and 1150 C.E. It has an extension of 105,555 m^{2} with 165 buildings and 17 ball courts. The main attraction is the Pyramid of the Niches. It also has a site museum. At the Tajin site every year is the Cumbre Tajin Festival which falls on the spring equinox. It celebrates Totonac heritage with concerts, conferences, food, cultural events workshops and more. Another archeological zone is Cuyuxquihui, which extends about thirty hectares. It contains various pre-Hispanic structures of which the military fort and the ceremonial center stand out. It is located about 37 km from the city.

There are also two ecological parks called Kiwíkgolo and Xanath.

== See also ==
- Papantla Totonac language
