= Serafin Olarte =

Serafin Olarte (died 1821) was a Totonac chief and general who led a revolt against Spanish rule during the Mexican War of Independence in the province of Veracruz.

His date of birth about 1767. Olarte first appeared in 1813, when he gathered a force of 400 Totonacs and fought against the Spanish in the area near Papantla in the mountains of Cuyuxquihui. From 1812 until end of 1820 the countryside of northern Veracruz was hotbed of rebel activity and guerrilla fighting. Previous rebellions occurred in 1735, 1762, 1764, 1767, and 1787 and as a result Paplanta's inhabitants had a reputation among the royalist forces as troublemakers. The Olarte family was one of the most important ones in the area around due to their participation in many local Totonac cabildos (councils) and ability to raise troops from the local indigenous population.

Serafin 1814 met Ignacio López Rayón in Zacatlan and formally joined the fight for Mexican independence. He was able to gather together diverse tribes and groups in an overall coalition, which made him one of the most successful commanders in the area. His force soon grew to several thousand warriors, and even though they were lightly armed compared to their opponents, he repulsed several attacks by the Spanish royalists and kept them from controlling the region. Olarte and Vicente Guerrero were the only independentist generals active during the low point of the war of independence after the execution of José María Morelos in 1815. In 1816 he defended Tlaxcalantongo although eventually he was forced to retreat to Cerro el Blanco. In 1819 he tried to take Papantla but was unsuccessful and the Spanish burned the town in reprisal.

With the Treaty of Cordoba in 1821 Mexico gained its independence from Spain. The same year however, Serafin Olarte was killed by Spanish troops in an ambush near Papantla.

Serafin's son, Mariano Olarte fought alongside his father and then also led another rebellion in Veracruz in 1836–1838. In December 1935 the name of the city of Papantla de Hidalgo was officially changed to that of Papantla de Olarte in his honor.
