= Disappearance of Alfredo Jiménez Mota =

2005 disappearance in Mexico

Alfredo Jimenez Mota
- Born: February 16, 1980; Hermosillo, Sonora, Mexico
- Disappeared: April 2, 2005 (aged 25); Hermosillo, Sonora, Mexico
- Status: Missing for 21 years, 3 months and 6 days
- Monuments: Plaque at the Plaza del Tinaco, Hermosillo, Sonora, Mexico
- Education: Communications
- Occupations: Journalist & editor
- Years active: 5 years
- Employer: El Imparcial
- Organization(s): Attorney General of Culiacán, Sinaloa, Mexico
- Known for: reporting on public safety, organized crime, and government involvement in drug trafficking in the region.
- Parents: Jose Jiménez Hernandez (father); Esperanza Mota Martinez (mother)
- Relatives: Leticia Jiménez Mota (sister)
- Awards: International Editor of the Year, 2005

Alfredo Jiménez Mota (February 16, 1980 – disappeared April 2, 2005) was a 25-year-old Mexican journalist, working for El Imparcial (Hermosillo) in the northern city of Hermosillo, Sonora, Mexico, who went missing while investigating government involvement with organized crime and drug traffickers in Sinaloa during the Mexican drug war. Journalist José Reveles reported in his book, El cártel incómodo: El fin de los Beltrán Leyva y la hegemonía del Chapo Guzmán, that Raúl Gutiérrez Parra, who was also later killed, ordered Los Güeros to murder Jiménez Mota as his investigations interfered with the flow of drugs through Sinaloa.

== Personal ==
Alfredo Jiménez Mota was born on February 16, 1980, in Hermosillo, Sonora, Mexico, where he continued to reside as a career minded bachelor. He is the only son of Esperanza Mota Martinez and Jose Alfredo Jiménez Hernandez, and the only brother of Leticia, his sister. Jiménez Mota began his work in the state of Sinaloa upon earning his degree at the Universidad de Occidente in Culiacán, in Communication. The Jiménez family are Catholic and attended Cristo Rey de Empalme, where Jiménez Mota sang in the choir. In his early years, Jiménez Mota enjoyed boxing, weighing in at 240-pounds.

== Career ==
The career of Alfredo Jiménez Mota' began in newspapers while he was still a student in Culiacán, where he worked for El Sol de Culiacán, El Debate and Noroeste, Sinaloa. and began to report in the genre of the nota roja (tabloid-style crime stories). He was also director of social communication at the Attorney General Office of Culiacán, Sinaloa. In late 2004, Jiménez Mota joined El Imparcial, where he often wrote stories dangerous enough that editors did not want to print his byline but Jiménez Mota insisted on the credit. He disappeared five months into his employment.

== Disappearance ==
Hermosillo is located in the state of Sonora and shown within Mexico relative to the capital Mexico City.

Prior to his disappearance, Jiménez Mota was investigating the government's involvement in drug trafficking in the region of Sinaloa and possible involvement with the Beltrán Leyva and Sinaloa cartels, the latter involving drug lords Ismael "El Mayo" Zambada García and Joaquín "El Chapo" Guzmán. The United States Drug Enforcement Administration was also investigating drug trafficking into the US from this northern border region. On April 2, 2005, Jiménez Mota was being followed and photographed, which led to him seeking refuge at Los Grillos, a restaurant at Hidalgo Square, until he could safely make his way back to his office. Prior to this incident he was receiving death threats from an unknown source which led to his vigilance on the job and in his personal life. It was later this same evening when Jiménez Mota disappeared, never to be seen nor heard from again. According to his friends and colleagues, Jiménez Mota failed to show up for drinks at a restaurant where they planned to speak about their days events. During his investigations, Jiménez Mota caused a stir in the State Attorney General's office by his persistence. He also angered the Police Chief while examining connections between the department and local drug trafficking. There are conflicting accounts on what happened the evening Jiménez Mota went missing. In one account, there is a letter which states the remains of Jiménez Mota could be found in one of three "safe houses" in Villa Itson. In another account, two women who claim to have been kidnapped but got away, say they overheard their captors speaking of Jiménez Mota being held at the same location prior to his execution. The remains of Jiménez Mota have yet to be found, no perpetrators have been charged, and the case remains unsolved.

== Context ==
In an effort to silence reporters, Mexico ranks 11th of all countries, and 1st in Latin countries in cartel-related homicides of journalists. While there are many suspects in the disappearance of Alfredo Jiménez Mota, the case has never been solved. In November 2005, a suspect Raúl Enrique Parra and drug trafficker was brutally murdered.

== Impact ==
Jiménez Mota's disappearance marked the first case of missing or murdered journalists in Hermosillo, the capitol of the state of Sonora. Within days of his disappearance the Inter American Press Association (IAPA) and Rapid Response Unit (URR) began to investigate. The IAPA demanded all authorities get involved in an effort to stop the murder of journalists and to support the effort of freedom of expression. The case was taken to the Deputy Attorney General for Specialized Investigation in Organized Crime (SIEDO) where they vowed the case would be resolved. The IAPA and over 40 newspaper directors met in August 2005 to discuss solutions and build strength in journalism. While the reporting arm of this group—called the Phoenix Group after a similar investigative project in the United States after Don Bolles was murdered by the mafia—revealed federal and state officials could be involved in the disappearance of Jiménez Mota, the administrative arm issued the "Declaration of Hermosillo" as a set of concrete steps the state could take to ensure the safety of journalists. With the growing intimidation of reporters, the IAPA published a map which provided journalists locations of high risk and safety issues.

== Reactions ==
The family of Alfredo Jiménez Mota held a memorial on the 10th anniversary of their son's disappearance with memorabilia and activities. The community of Hermocillo celebrated his memory by attending the unveiling of a plaque which was placed at The Plaza del Tinaco in his honor.

In a letter to the Attorney General of Mexico, the Committee to Protect Journalists wrote, "The Committee to Protect Journalists would like to express its concern about the fate of Alfredo Jiménez Mota ... We are worried about our colleague's safety. We urge you to conduct a timely and thorough investigation, locate Jiménez, and bring him to safety. CPJ will be monitoring the investigation and respectfully asks that you make available to us any information you might have regarding this case."

Colleagues of Jiménez Mota demanded the Attorney General of the Republic (PGR) to step up its investigation. The consensus in the media community was those who were possibly involved, were sweeping the case under the rug. Since the disappearance of Jiménez Mota, the fight to "quiet" the press has made reporting difficult.

Koïchiro Matsuura, director-general of UNESCO, said in a statement that also included Jiménez Mota, "Crimes against journalists and editors constitute a grievous offence against democracy."

== Awards ==
Mota was posthumously awarded the International Editor Award 2005 for his bravery in journalism.

== See also ==
- List of people who disappeared mysteriously (2000–present)
- List of journalists and media workers killed in Mexico
- List of kidnappings
- Human rights in Mexico
