= Raúl Gibb Guerrero =

Mexican journalist (1952–2005)

Raúl Gibb
- Raúl Gibb Guerrero
- Born: 1952
- Died: 8 April 2005 (aged 52–53); Papantla, Veracruz, Mexico
- Cause of death: Murdered
- Occupations: Owner and editor of the newspaper La Opinión
- Known for: his newspaper's coverage of corruption involving drug traffickers and the government.
- Awards: 2005–2006 International Editors of the Year
- Website: noticias.laopinion.com.mx

Raúl Gibb Guerrero (1952 – 8 April 2005) was a Mexican editor and the founder and owner of the newspaper La Opinión in Poza Rica, Veracruz, Mexico. Gibb was murdered in Veracruz and was awarded "2005-2006 International Editors of the Year" by WorldPress.org. His newspaper had already won awards for his coverage of corruption.

== Personal ==
Gibb's sister had been under investigation earlier for arms possession.

Norma Gibb Guerrero became the owner of La Opinión after Raúl Gibb's murder and she was appointed to the Veracruz State Commission for the Care and Protection of Journalists by Governor Javier Duarte de Ochoa in June 2007.

== Career ==
Raúl Gibb was the editor and owner of the La Opinión. Gibb and two other Mexican editors, Dolores Guadalupe García Escamilla and Alfredo Jiménez Mota, were awarded editors of the year for 2005-2006 by WorldPress.org. The WorldPress citation read

... (the three) gave the ultimate sacrifice in their pursuit of journalistic excellence and freedom of the press. Their courage, tenacity, and dedication in covering sensitive subjects, especially drug trafficking, caused them to live in a danger zone of threats and violence, which ultimately led to their murders. They led three very separate lives, but had the love of their country and press freedom in common.

The organization said it wanted to shine a spotlight on the dangers faced by Mexican journalists as a result of Mexico's Drug War.

== Death ==
Four males in two vehicles, a red Ford truck and a Nissan, ambushed Gibb while the editor was driving from Martínez de la Torre, Veracruz, where he was expanding his newspaper, to Papantla, Veracruz, where he lived. Out of 15 shots fired at Gibb, three were to the head and caused him to crash. He was found dead at the crash site, which was only 200 meters from his home. The attack occurred sometime between 9:30 p.m. and 11 p.m. on 8 April 2005. For several months, Gibb had been receiving death threats for his newspaper's coverage of corruption and connections between drug cartels and the government. He had received two threats one day before the attack. Authorities said they had assigned 60 investigators to Gibb's case, of which 30 were at the federal level.

Mentioned locations within Mexico relative to the capital Mexico City.

== Context ==
The first journalist killed in 2005 was Gibb. Two other journalists were attacked the same week that Gibb was killed. One of those journalist was Alfredo Jiménez Mota. Alfredo Jiménez Mota worked for El Imparcial of Hermosillo. Mota is presumed to be dead after his disappearance on April 2, 2005, which was just six days after the death of Gibb.

== Impact ==
According to Secretary General of Government, Reynaldo Escobar Perez, Veracruz was affected by the "cockroach effect" of drug traffickers that are fought in other Mexican states.

Between the years 2000 and 2012, there have been over 100 deaths of journalists in the country of Mexico. According to an analysis by Terra, Gibb was killed early in the Mexican drug war and was one of the earliest journalists killed in Veracruz state, where at least 17 journalists have been killed since 2000, and it is the deadliest state for Mexican journalists. Following Veracruz, the second most deadly states for Mexican journalists are Chihuahua, Guerrero, and Tamaulipas. In these three states, there have been at least 12 deaths in each state since 2000.

== Reactions ==
Koïchiro Matsuura, the director-general of UNESCO, said "I condemn the killing of Raúl Gibb Guerrero ... I trust that the authorities will do all in their power to find and prosecute the perpetrators of this crime, which is a serious attack on press freedom and freedom of expression, which are essential to democracy and rule of law." The Inter American Press Association (IAPA) and the press freedom organization Reporters Without Border, in addition to others, have voiced outrage at two other recent acts of violence against the Mexican press, speaking of a deterioration in press freedom in the country.

Javier Duarte de Ochoa, the governor of Veracruz, sent a bill to the local Congress to create the State Commission for the Care and Protection of Journalists, which is an independent body that is responsible for the care and ensures personal integrity of the many journalists in the state. This bill would also promote and protect the right to protect the right to information and freedom of expression. Duarte said

"... media and journalists covering, face and often suffer the effects of this phenomenon, whose seal is violence, through which it intends to submit to the institutions and undermine the rule of law. As a citizen and as president, I know that the best way of dealing with problems is to recognize them and act accordingly."

== See also ==
- Mexican drug war
- List of journalists killed in Mexico
