= Cazones River =

Coordinates: 20.7251°N 97.2002°W

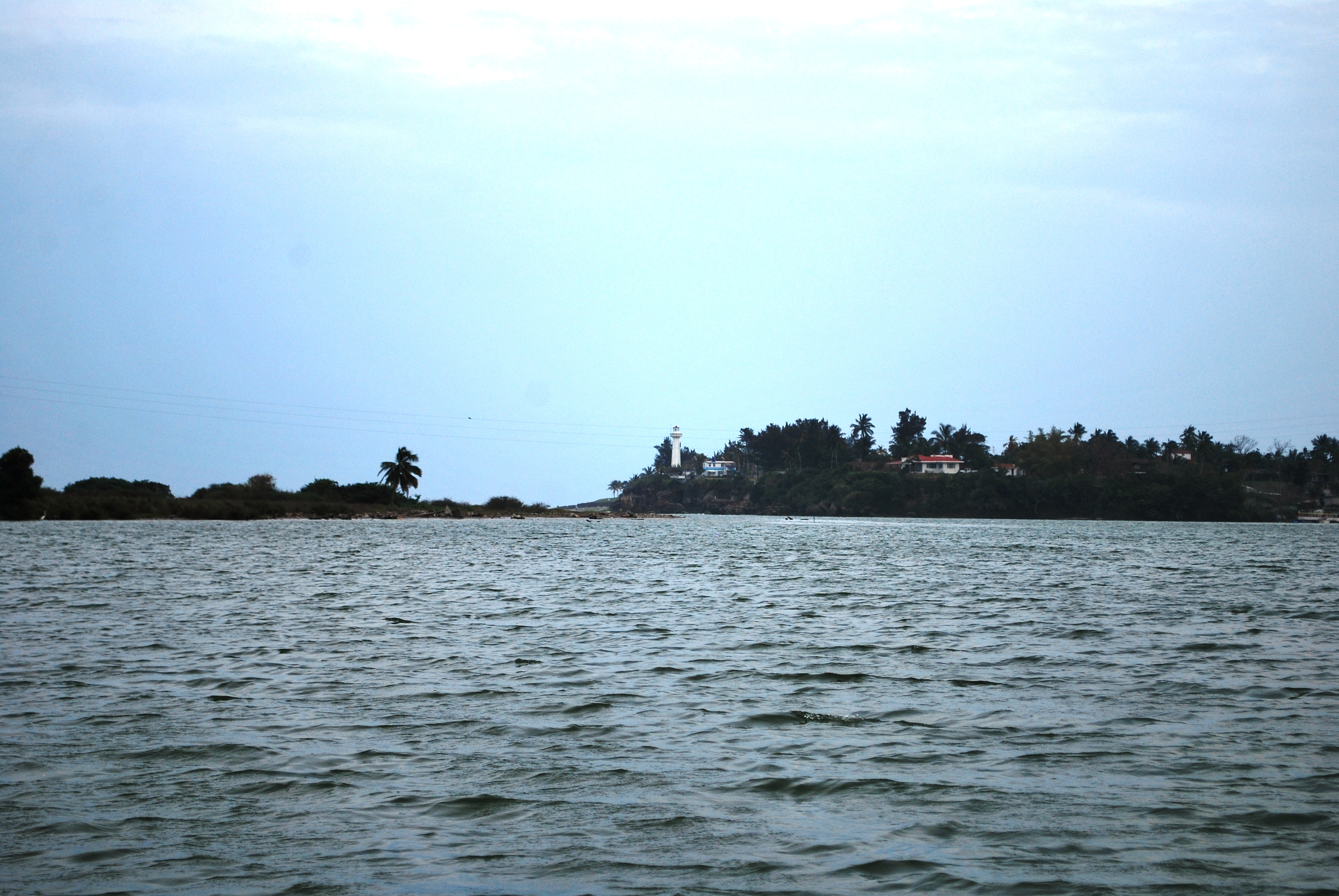
- Mouth of Cazones River with Cazones lighthouse in background

Location
- Country: Mexico

The Cazones River is a river of Mexico.

== See also ==
- List of rivers of Mexico
