= 6th federal electoral district of Veracruz =

Federal electoral district of Mexico

Veracruz's 6th
- Electoral district of the Chamber of Deputies of Mexico

- 6th district since 2023

Incumbent
- Member: Jaime Humberto Pérez
- Party: ▌Morena
- Congress: 66th (2024–2027)

District
- State: Veracruz
- Head town: Papantla de Olarte
- Coordinates: 20°26′52″N 97°19′12″W
- Covers: 13 municipalities: Cazones de Herrera, Chumatlán, Coahuitlán, Coatzintla, Coxquihui, Coyutla, Espinal, Filomeno Mata, Gutiérrez Zamora, Mecatlán, Papantla, Tecolutla, Zozocolco
- PR region: Third
- Precincts: 250
- Population: 416,607 (2020 census)
- Indigenous: Yes (67%)

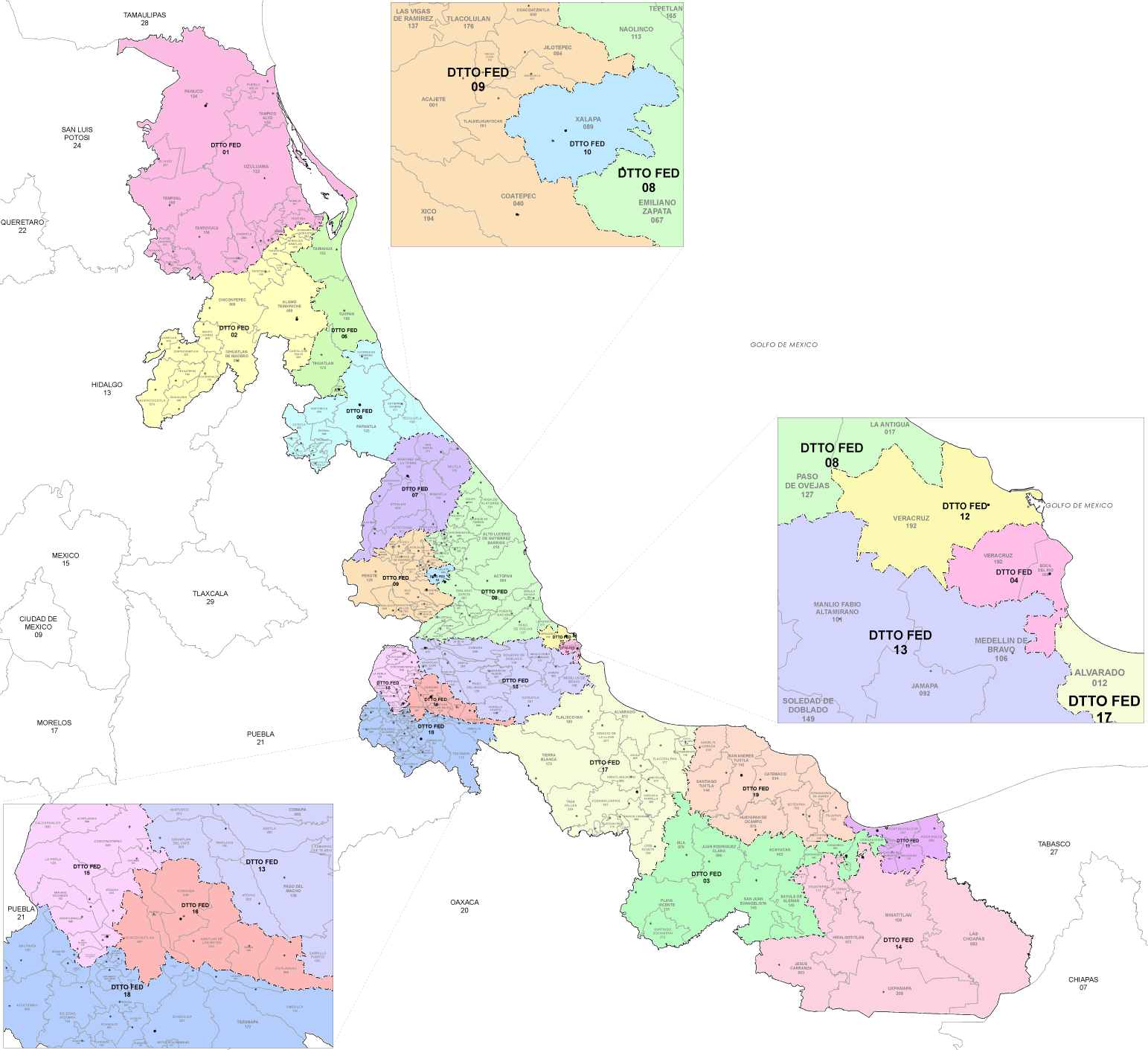
Federal electoral districts of Veracruz since 2023

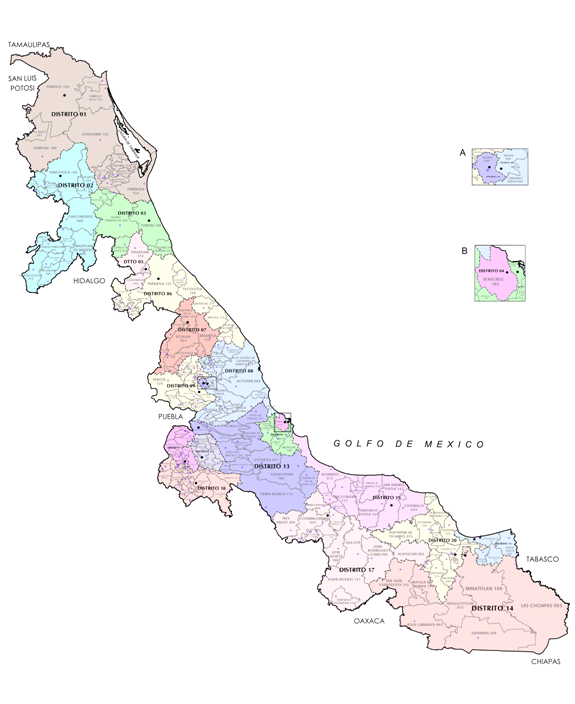
Veracruz under the 2017–2022 districting plan

The 6th federal electoral district of Veracruz (Spanish: Distrito electoral federal 06 de Veracruz) is one of the 300 electoral districts into which Mexico is divided for elections to the federal Chamber of Deputies and one of 19 such districts in the state of Veracruz.

It elects one deputy to the lower house of Congress for each three-year legislative session by means of the first-past-the-post system. Votes cast in the district also count towards the calculation of proportional representation ("plurinominal") deputies elected from the third region.

The current member for the district, re-elected in the 2024 general election, is Jaime Humberto Pérez Bernabé of the National Regeneration Movement (Morena).

== District territory ==
Veracruz lost a congressional district in the 2023 districting plan adopted by the National Electoral Institute (INE), which is to be used for the 2024, 2027 and 2030 elections. The reconfigured 6th district covers 250 electoral precincts (secciones electorales) across 13 municipalities in the Totonaca region of the state:

- Cazones de Herrera, Chumatlán, Coahuitlán, Coatzintla, Coxquihui, Coyutla, Espinal, Filomeno Mata, Gutiérrez Zamora, Mecatlán, Papantla, Tecolutla and Zozocolco.

The head town (cabecera distrital), where results from individual polling stations are gathered together and tallied, is the city of Papantla de Olarte. The district reported a population of 416,607 in the 2020 census and, with Indigenous and Afrodescendent inhabitants accounting for over 67% of that total, it is classified by the INE as an indigenous district. (Note: The INE deems any local or federal electoral district where Indigenous or Afrodescendent inhabitants number 40% or more of the total to be an indigenous district.)

== Previous districting schemes ==
Evolution of electoral district numbers
	1974	1978	1996	2005	2017	2023
Veracruz	15	23	23	21	20	19
Chamber of Deputies	196	300				

Because of shifting demographics, Veracruz currently has four fewer districts than the 23 the state was allocated under the 1977 electoral reforms.

2017–2022

Between 2017 and 2022, Veracruz was assigned 20 electoral districts. The 6th district still had its head town at Papantla and it comprised 15 municipalities:
- Coahuitlán, Colipa, Coxquihui, Coyutla, Chumatlán, Espinal, Filomeno Mata, Gutiérrez Zamora, Mecatlán, Nautla, Papantla, San Rafael, Tecolutla, Vega de Alatorre and Zozocolco.

2005–2017

Veracruz's allocation of congressional seats fell to 21 in the 2005 redistricting process. Between 2005 and 2017 the district had its head town at Papantla and it covered 11 municipalities:
- Coahuitlán, Coxquihui, Coyutla, Chumatlán, Espinal, Filomeno Mata, Gutiérrez Zamora, Mecatlán, Papantla, Tecolutla and Zozocolco.

1996–2005

Under the 1996 districting plan, which allocated Veracruz 23 districts, the head town was at Papantla and the district covered 9 municipalities.

1978–1996

The districting scheme in force from 1978 to 1996 was the result of the 1977 electoral reforms, which increased the number of single-member seats in the Chamber of Deputies from 196 to 300. Under that plan, Veracruz's seat allocation rose from 15 to 23. The 6th district had its head town at Xalapa and it covered the municipalities of Acatlán, Xalapa, Naolinco and Tepetlán.

== Deputies returned to Congress ==
(Mexico) National parties
- Current
- PAN
- PRI
- PT
- PVEM
- MC
- Morena
- PAZ
- Somos
- Defunct or local only
- PLM
- PNR
- PRM
- PNM
- PP
- PPS
- PARM
- PFCRN
- CON
- PANAL
- PSD
- PES
- PES
- PRD

Veracruz's 6th district
Election	Deputy	Party	Term	Legislature
1916	Eliseo L. Céspedes		1916–1917	Constituent Congress of Querétaro
...
1973	José Luis Melgarejo Vivanco	Institutional Revolutionary Party	1973–1976	49th Congress
1976	Carlos Manuel Vargas Sánchez	Institutional Revolutionary Party	1976–1979	50th Congress
1979	Luis Octavio Porte Petit Moreno	Institutional Revolutionary Party	1979–1982	51st Congress
1982	Salvador Valencia Carmona	Institutional Revolutionary Party	1982–1985	52nd Congress
1985	Héctor Yunes Landa	Institutional Revolutionary Party	1985–1988	53rd Congress
1988	Ricardo Olivares Pineda	Institutional Revolutionary Party	1988–1991	54th Congress
1991	Rubén Pabello Rojas	Institutional Revolutionary Party	1991–1994	55th Congress
1994	Ignacio González Rebolledo	Institutional Revolutionary Party	1994–1997	56th Congress
1997	Domingo Yorio Saqui	Institutional Revolutionary Party	1997–2000	57th Congress
2000	Bonifacio Castillo Cruz	Party of the Democratic Revolution	2000–2003	58th Congress
2003	Rómulo Salazar Macías	Institutional Revolutionary Party	2003–2006	59th Congress
2006	José Manuel del Río Virgen	Citizens' Movement (Mexico)	2006–2009	60th Congress
2009	Francisco Herrera Jiménez	Institutional Revolutionary Party	2009–2012	61st Congress
2012	Alma Jeanny Arroyo Ruiz	Institutional Revolutionary Party	2012–2015	62nd Congress
2015	Heidi Salazar Espinosa	Institutional Revolutionary Party	2015–2018	63rd Congress
2018	Jaime Humberto Pérez Bernabé	National Regeneration Movement	2018–2021	64th Congress
2021	Jaime Humberto Pérez Bernabé	National Regeneration Movement	2021–2024	65th Congress
2024	Jaime Humberto Pérez Bernabé	National Regeneration Movement	2024–2027	66th Congress

== Presidential elections ==
Veracruz's 6th district
Election	District won by	Party or coalition	%
2018	Andrés Manuel López Obrador	Juntos Haremos Historia	49.6457
2024	Claudia Sheinbaum Pardo	Sigamos Haciendo Historia	68.6493
