= Totonaca Region =

- Region
- In Veracruz
- Country: Mexico
- State: Veracruz
- Largest city: Poza Rica

Population (2020)
  - Total: 695,111
- Time zone: UTC−6 (CST)

Totonaca Region is one of the regions of Veracruz, Mexico. Its largest city is Poza Rica.

== Municipalities ==
Municipality code	Name	Population		Land Area			Population density	
Municipality code	Name	2020	Rank	km^{2}	sq mi	Rank	2020	Rank
033	Cazones de Herrera	24,421	7	272.3	105.1	5	90/km^{2} (232/sq mi)	14
064	Chumatlán	4,008	15	23	8.9	15	174/km^{2} (451/sq mi)	8
037	Coahuitlán	8,176	14	41.8	16.1	14	196/km^{2} (507/sq mi)	7
040	Coatzintla	55,016	4	277.7	107.2	4	198/km^{2} (513/sq mi)	6
050	Coxquihui	16,333	11	80.3	31.0	9	203/km^{2} (527/sq mi)	5
051	Coyutla	23,096	9	234	90	7	99/km^{2} (256/sq mi)	13
066	Espinal	26,830	5	240.9	93.0	6	111/km^{2} (288/sq mi)	11
067	Filomeno Mata	19,179	10	43.3	16.7	13	443/km^{2} (443/km^{2})	2
069	Gutiérrez Zamora	24,085	8	179.5	69.3	8	134/km^{2} (348/sq mi)	9
103	Mecatlán	12,799	13	43.6	16.8	12	294/km^{2} (760/sq mi)	3
124	Papantla	159,910	2	1,456.5	562.4	1	110/km^{2} (284/sq mi)	12
131	Poza Rica	189,457	1	64.1	24.7	11	2,956/km^{2} (7,655/sq mi)	1
158	Tecolutla	24,551	6	531.1	205.1	3	46/km^{2} (120/sq mi)	15
175	Tihuatlán	92,726	3	718.4	277.4	2	129/km^{2} (334/sq mi)	10
203	Zozocolco de Hidalgo	14,524	12	68.9	26.6	10	211/km^{2} (546/sq mi)	4
	Totonaca Region	695,111	—	7,080	1,650.59	—	163/km^{2} (421/sq mi)	—
Source: INEGI

=== Largest cities ===
Largest cities or towns in Totonaca Region Source:
Rank		Municipality	Pop.
1	Poza Rica de Hidalgo	Poza Rica de Hidalgo	180,057
2	Papantla de Olarte	Papantla	55,452
3	Coatzintla	Coatzintla	34,039
4	Filomeno Mata	Filomeno Mata	15,417
5	Tihuatlán	Tihuatlán	15,305
6	Gutiérrez Zamora	Gutiérrez Zamora	13,966
7	Plan de Ayala	Tihuatlán	11,834
8	Coyutla	Coyutla	9,133
9	Totolapa	Tihuatlán	7,938
10	Agua Dulce	Papantla	6,015
