= Tecolutla =

- Town and municipality
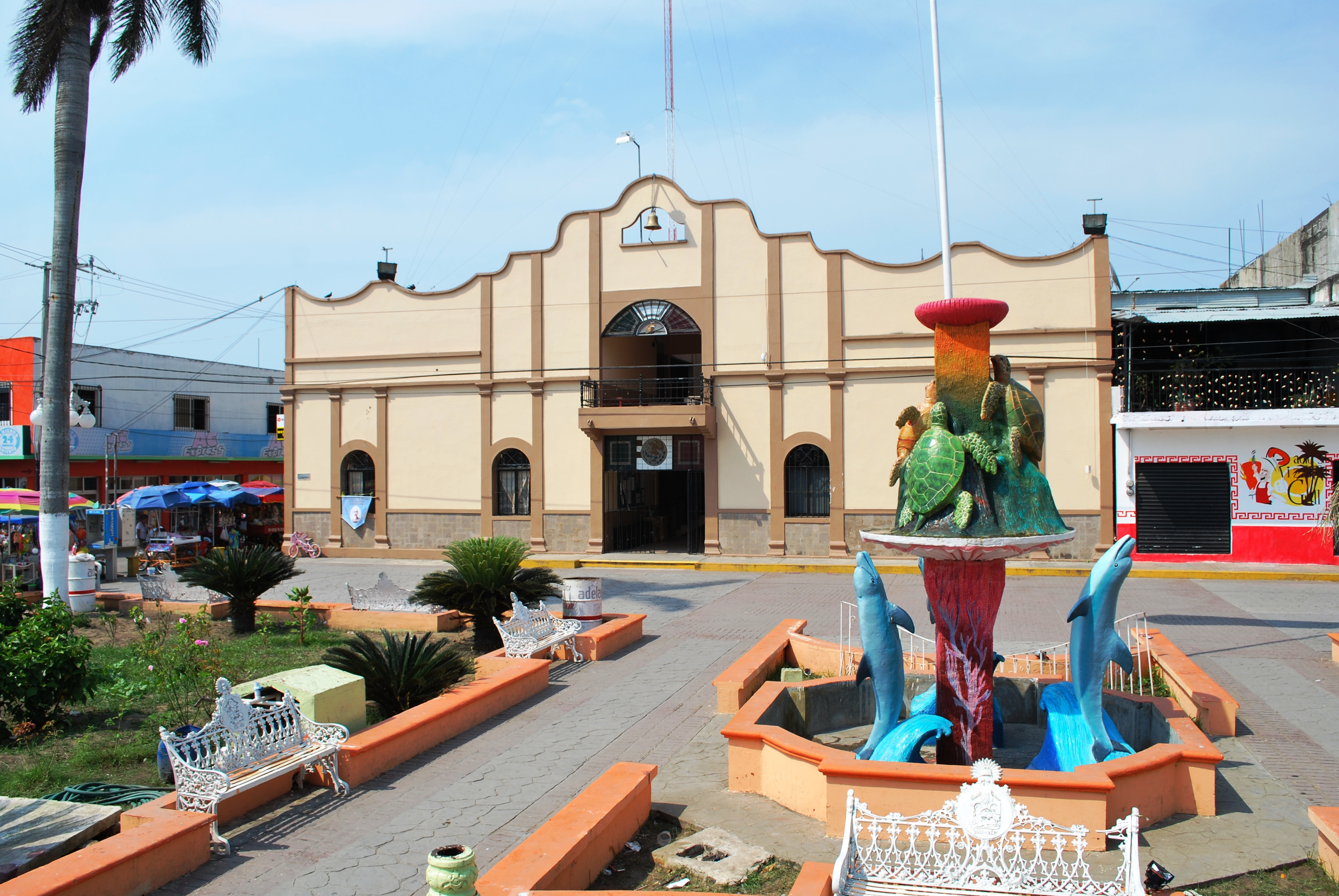
- Fountain and municipal palace of Tecolutla

- Location within Veracruz Location within Mexico
- Coordinates: 20°28′47″N 97°00′36″W
- Country: Mexico
- State: Veracruz
- Region: Totonaca Region
- Municipal Status: 1879

Government
  - Municipal President: Wenceslao Santiago Castro

Area
  - Municipality: 471.31 km^{2} (181.97 sq mi)
- Elevation (of seat): 10 m (33 ft)

Population (2020) Municipality
  - Municipality: 24,551
  - Seat: 5,432
- Time zone: UTC-6 (Zona Centro)
- Postal code (of seat): 93570

Tecolutla is a town and municipality located on the Tecolutla River on the eastern coast of the state of Veracruz in Mexico. It has the closest beaches to Mexico City, and much of its economy is based on tourism, as it is only a four- or five-hour drive from the capital. It is the northern end of a tourist corridor along the Gulf of Mexico called the "Emerald Coast," which extends down to the city of Veracruz.

Tecolutla's biggest attraction is its natural settings of wetlands with estuaries, canals and mangroves associated with the river. The town is known for the "Tecolutla Monster,"—probably a dead whale—that was washed ashore in 1969. Its remains are kept at the Marine Museum. The name Tecolutla means "place of the tecolotes or owls."

== Tourism ==
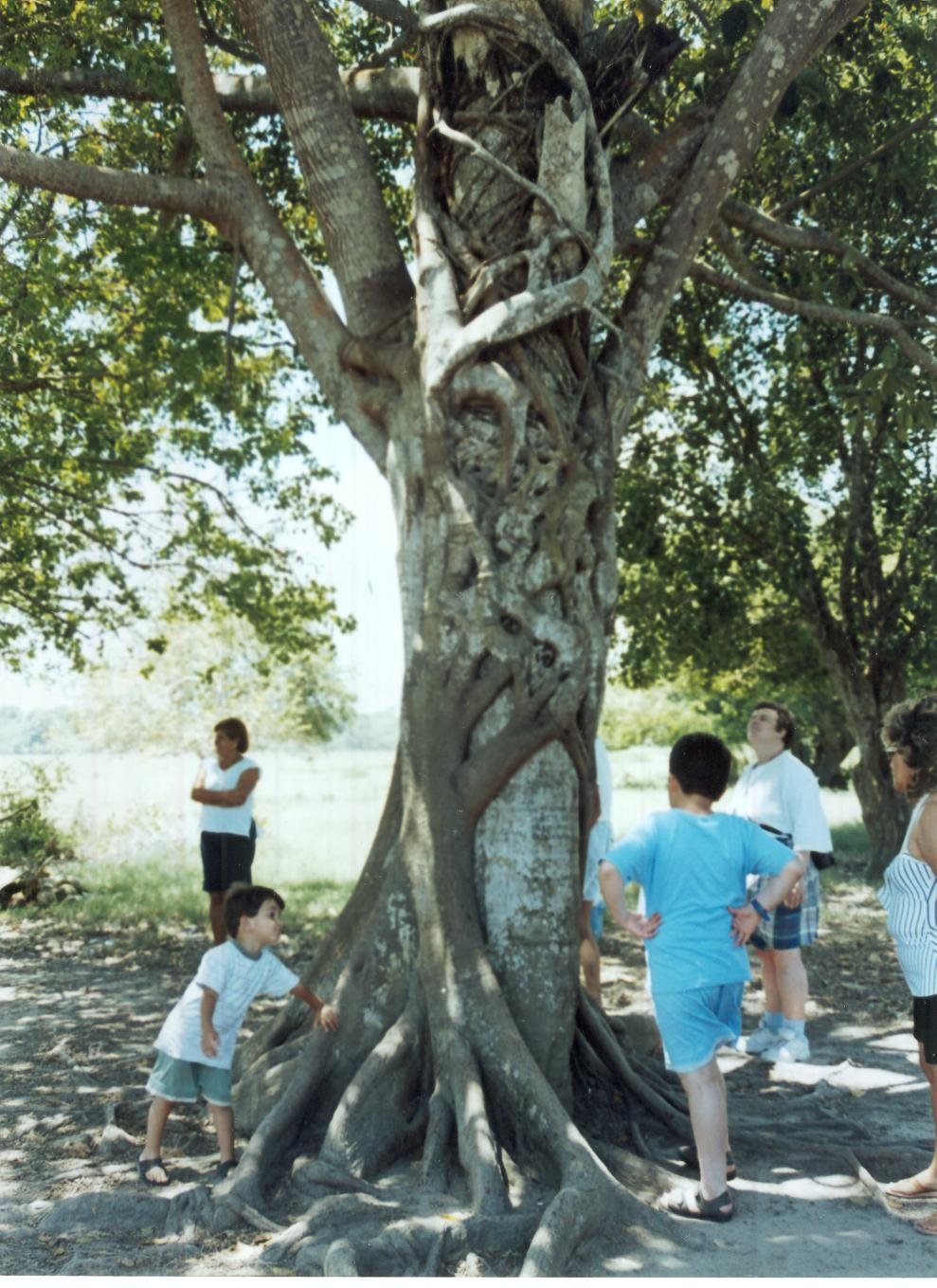
The "lovers" intertwined trees

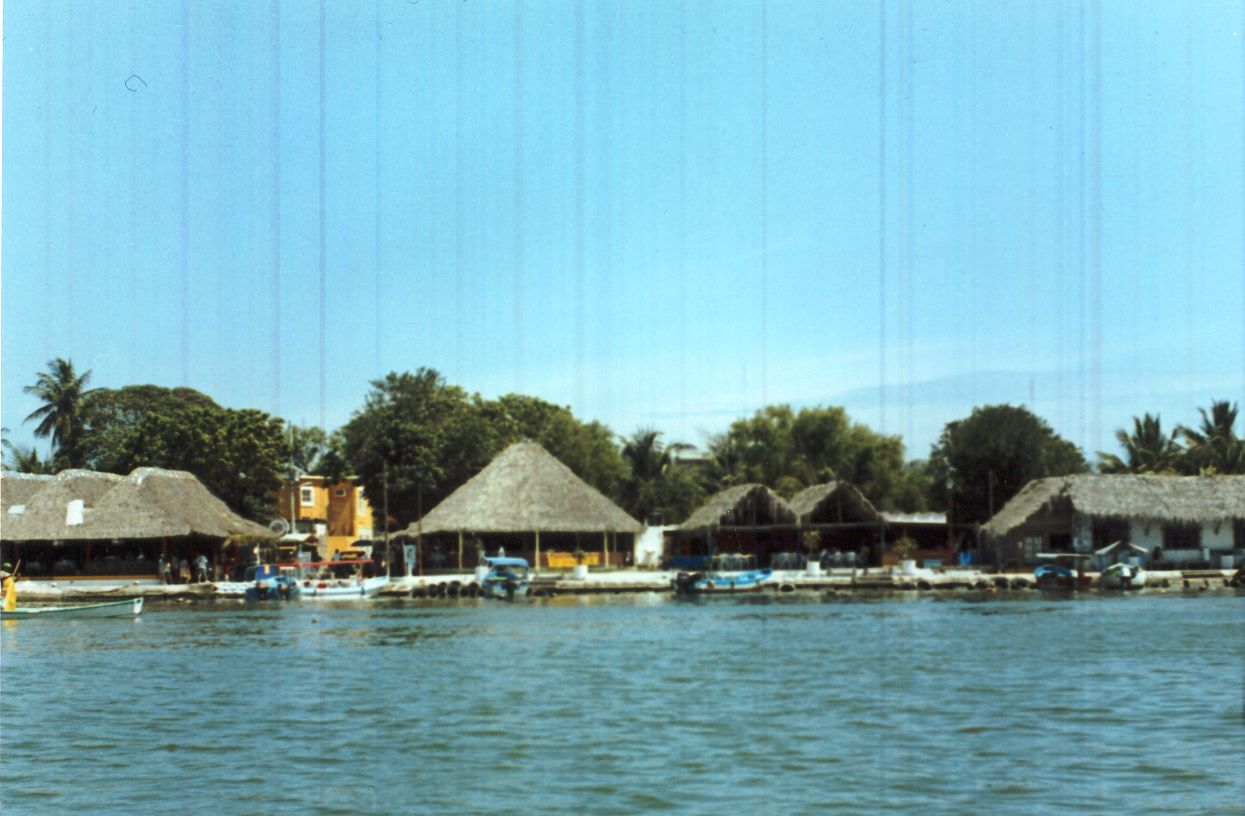
Docks along a lagoon in Tecolutla

The most important and growing economic activity in the zone is tourism. Tecolutla has the closest beaches to Mexico City. The town has about 15 km of beaches which face directly onto the Gulf of Mexico. (The municipality has a total of 40 km.) These beaches generally have gentle waves and warm water, except during storms called "nortes." These are strong cold fronts that come down from the north along Mexico's Atlantic coast between December and February and can cause sudden drops in temperature and winds. This fickle weather keeps Tecolutla and many other Gulf coast communities from becoming major resort areas like Cancun.

The oldest hotel is the Hotel Tecolutla, built in 1949, which has been preserved in its period. It used to be the only sizable building in town, but since the turn of the 21st century, numerous hotels have been developed. They generally cater to budget travelers from Mexico City, also attracting travelers from Xalapa, the state capital. This tourism is mainly concentrated during peak seasons, such as Christmas and Easter holidays, and special events such as the annual fishing tournament. During the rest of the year, it is fairly empty.

The beaches of the town of Tecolutla divide into North and South beaches, each with their own hotel zones, restaurants, and camping areas. Both offer boat rides and bicycle paths. At the South Beach, where breakwaters protect the mouth of the Tecolutla River, there are also beachside cabins. Docks serve boat rides up the river, as well as fishing expeditions on the river and in the Gulf. A type of boat often used to navigate around the estuaries is called a panguita, which looks like a very long canoe.

Cultural attractions include the Hueytepec archeological zone, the Parish of Nuestra Señora de Guadalupe, the old lighthouse, the Hotel Tecolutla, the Municipal Palace and the Marine Museum, which contains an exposition of river and ocean products. This museum, located on Matamoros Street, is a space containing more than 300 aquatic species both alive and preserved.

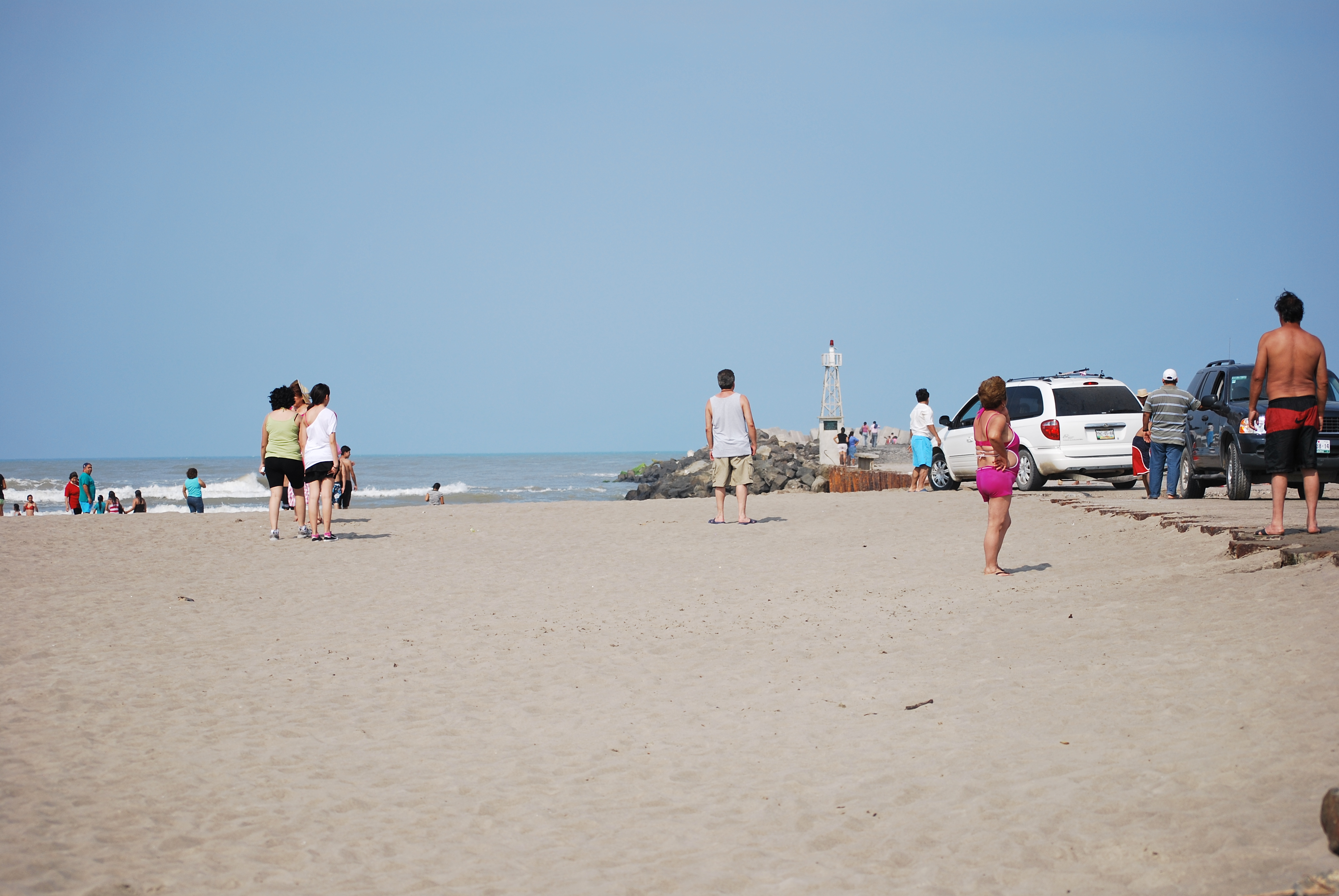
View of beach near the river

The town also hosts a number of events. From April to September each year, the beach known as Vida Milenaria is reserved for sea turtles returning here to breed. This project is led by Fernando Manzano, better known here as "Papá Tortuga" (Daddy Turtle). This group hatches and frees between five and six thousand baby marine turtles each year. The returning turtles lay about this number of eggs which volunteers collect and protect. Tourist are invited to help free the baby turtles when they hatch.

The annual fishing competition in May draws many visitors locally, from Mexico and even beyond. There are events for shad, sea bass and tarpon and take place both on the sea and on the Tecolutla River. This is one of the few times of the year the resort is packed.

Another annual event is the Coconut Festival in February, when local restaurants and hotels get together to make "the world's largest coconut custard in the world." In 2008, the dessert measured 2.15 by two meters, taking about 6,000 coconuts and two tons of sugar. After it is presented and measured, locals and tourists are invited to have some free.

One notable nearby attraction is the El Tajín archeological site, built by the same people who have inhabited this municipality, the Totonacs. Tecolutla is the closest beach to this site, which is about 40 km away. This was the most important ceremonial center in the area and it still host celebrations each year at the spring equinox.

== Geography ==
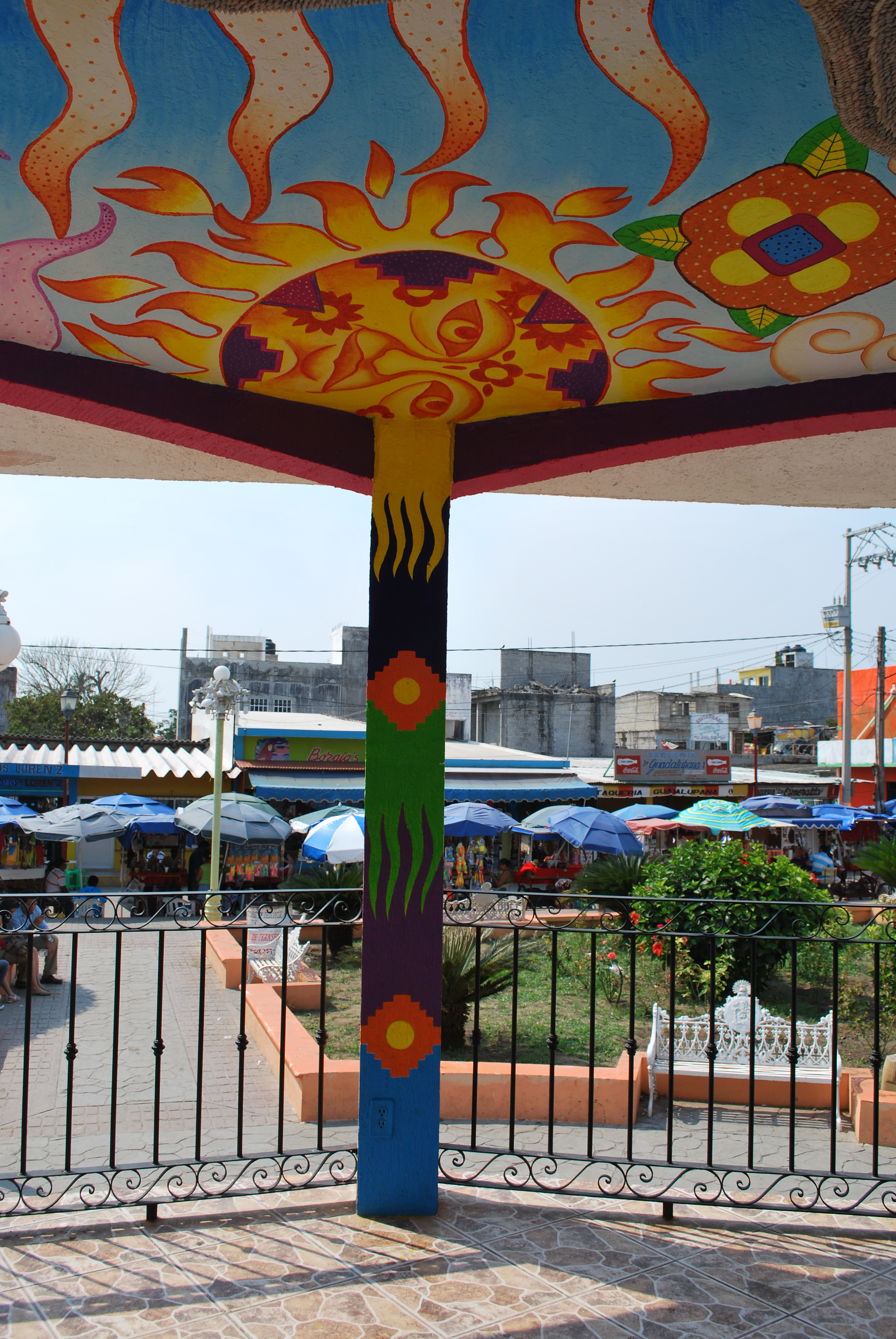
View from the kiosk in the main plaza

However, Tecolutla's biggest attraction is its geography and climate. Situated on the Veracruz coast, Tecolutla has estuaries, canals and mangroves. These estuaries are at the mouth of the Tecolutla River which flows through the states of Puebla and Veracruz, with an extension of 7,950.05 km. It is surrounded by the Sierra de Huachinango to the east and the Sierra de Zocapoaxtla to the south. The river is fed by summer rains in the lower elevation and by year-round rains in the higher elevations. The river passes by a number of cities and towns such as Cuetzalan, Zacapoaxtla, Zapotitlán, Huauchinango, Tajín, Tecuantepec, El Espinal, Papantla, Gutiérrez Zamora, Cazones, Coatzintla, Chumatlan, Poza Rica, then finally to Tecolutla at its mouth.

These estuaries have abundant vegetation and aquatic, and semi-aquatic wildlife such as crabs, lobsters, red snapper, shad, white and black herons and in the mangroves, two species of alligator. There are three estuaries that are visited most. The first is called Del Silencio, which has about five km of navigable waters and filled with mangroves. The name comes from the relative lack of sound, except for the buzzing of insects, and water dripping from trees. The second is called De la Cruz, with very clear waters, 25 km of navigable waters in which sea bass can be fished in season. The third is called Del Narajo and is the largest with 40 km of navigable waters and is bordered by ranches and orange groves. There is also an abundance of wild birds such as ibis, cormorants, parrots, guinea fowl, eagles, falcons, storks and others.

The municipality has 40 km of beaches. For ten km north along the coast from Tecolutla are the most important beaches: Santa María del Mar and Barra Boca de Lima, which have warm waters with some motion. At Barra Boca de Lima is the Largartos Estuary. A bit further away (32 km) is Barra Tenixtepec, which is suitable for aquatic sports. Tecolutla is the beginning of a small tourist corridor which includes beaches such as La Guadalupe, La Vigueta, Playa Oriente, Monte Gordo, Casitas and Maracaibo. This area is known as the Costa Esmeralda because of the green ocean near the beaches, and many contain three and four star hotels, bungalows and trailer parks.

== History ==
Tecolutla started as a pre-Hispanic settlement that had been dominated by a number of other peoples. The Tecolutla River was visited by Juan de Guijalva in 1518, three years before the Spanish Conquest of the Aztec Empire. The Colonial period for this area began in 1522, with the first Spanish settling here. This caused violent confrontations between the Spanish and the local people at first but eventually led a mixing and the native and the European, in culture, flora, fauna and economic activities. The old pagan ritual centers here were abandoned and have become archeological zones.

In 1787, a major conflict over agricultural resources broke out when the native peoples and two Spaniards, Juan de Vidal and Joaquin Suarez over ownership of lands in Tecolutla and surrounding areas bordering the Tecolutla River. Much of this land had been inhabited by native peoples with no formal title.

In 1810, the Mexican War of Independence began, with Serafin Olarte leading local efforts. In 1813, the ports of Tecolutla and Nautla are taken by insurgents and used to bring in arms. In 1814, the insurgents were driven out by the royalist army under Juan Navajero. In 1824, the state of Veracruz was created and Tecolutla became a community under the jurisdiction of the Papantla province. In 1825, the commercial port was constructed, which was blocked by the French during the Pastry War in 1838.

In 1847, the U.S. frigate, Gemanten, anchored itself in Tecolutla as part of the initial phases of the invasion of Mexico during the Mexican–American War. In 1857, sixty Italian families settled here as part of an agreement between the Mexican and Italian governments to promote immigration to Mexico. In 1866, Tecolutla was occupied by imperial forces under Maximilian five days after they took Papantla. The municipality was created in 1879, combining the parishes of Tecolutla, De Cristo and Boca de Lima, and the community of Tecolutla was elevated to the status of town in 1882.

In 1942, two ships, the Tuxpan and the Choapas, were torpedoed while in the port of Tecolutla. Major flooding of the Tecolutla in October 1999 cause widespread damage in the town, including washing away a number of homes and businesses. Most of this damage has now been repaired and many reconstructed roads and bridges are better than before. Tecolutla suffered another natural disaster August 27, 2007, when the eye of Hurricane Dean came ashore here. The intensity of the winds and rain led Civil Protection to issue a red alert for the region. The storm knocked out power as rivers and streams overflowed, closing down much of the infrastructure such as banks, roads and gas stations. It also forced 15,000 people into shelters in the tourist areas of this part of Veracruz state. On the early morning hours of August 21, 2021, Tecolutla suffered yet another natural disaster when the eye of Hurricane Grace came ashore. The cyclone had winds of 125 mph, making it a Category 3 hurricane, the strongest hurricane on record in the Bay of Campeche.

== The Tecolutla "Monster" ==
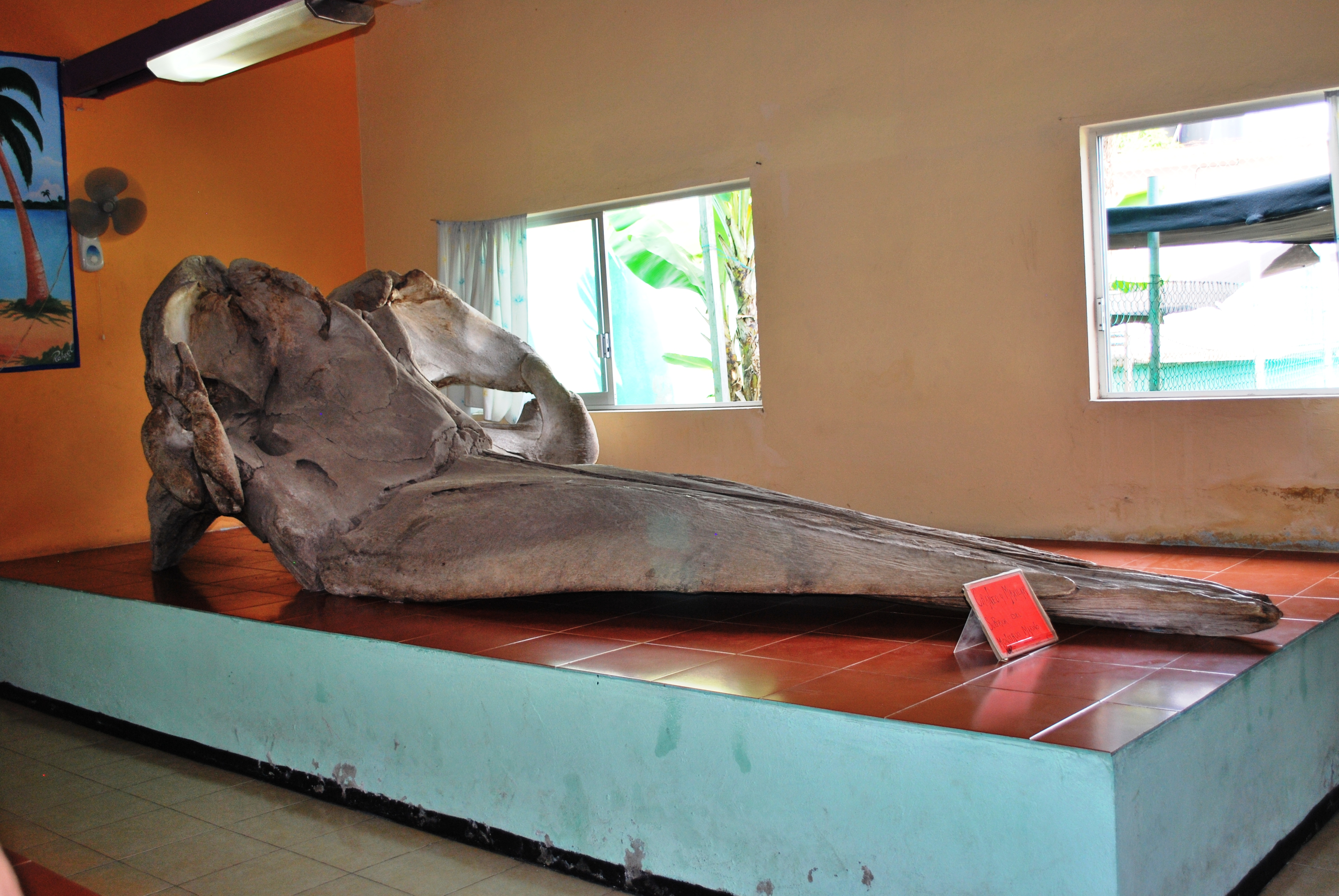
Skull of the "monster" at the community marine museum

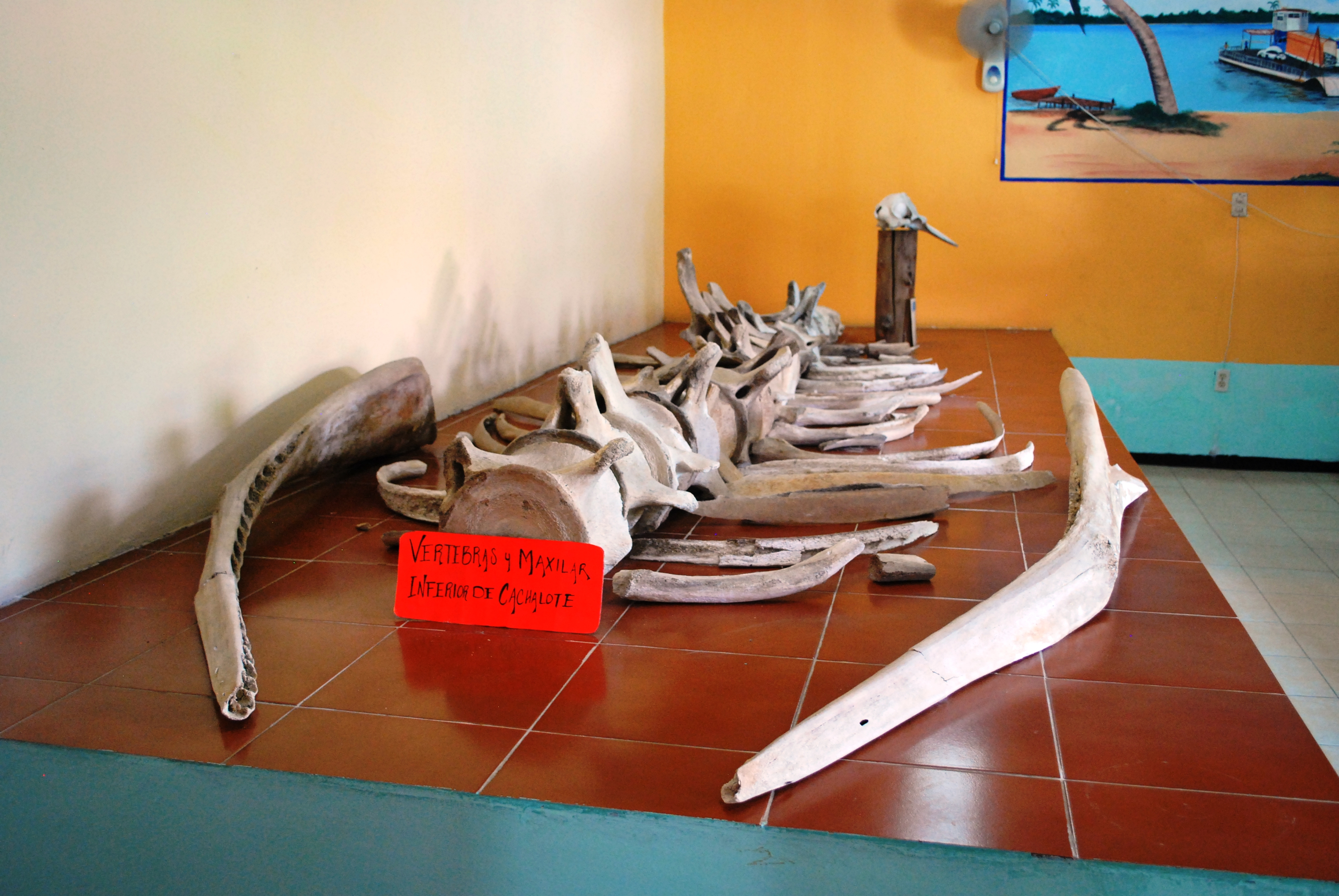
Vertebrae and ribs from the "monster"

In the Marine Museum there are bones and photographs from 3 or even 4 mixed, uncompleted sperm whales of the species Physeter macrocephalus (Linnaeus, 1758). These evidences are presented as a single animal called the Tecolutla monster. This legend becomes from an unreported stranding of a cetacean and its appearance after being cut off, burned, rotted and transported to Tecolutla's beach.

At first, it was falsely identified as a narwhal, but other people thought that the carcass was from a fin whale (Balaenoptera sp.), or another whale. However, the lack of an immediate and certain identification of the animal, and the loss of the original material, makes the cetacean unidentifiable. Few fin whale specimens are found in the Gulf of Mexico. But the stranding of whales have been recorded on Mexico's Atlantic coast. A whale arrived as far south as Quintana Roo (extreme southern Mexico). In Tecolutla itself, a sperm whale body washed up in 1976 and a pilot whale body in 1991. The descriptions of the dead creature vary because of imagination and ignorance, therefore the popular name is "monster". Some people found the animal looks like a giant worm, or with fibers hanging like a mane, or with either "wool" or armor plating, or both, or with a gigantic beak or bone-like fang sticking out of its head; the weight of the carcass was estimated between 24 and 35 tons, measuring 22 m long and 2 m wide. It was also rumored that an unknown Biology Institute of California wanted to buy the creature, also believing it to be prehistoric.

The carcass arrived to the Palmar Susana's beach between Tecolutla and Nautla. It was found by locals who kept its existence secret at first. It took 14 hours to get the animal out of the water and to raise it onto shore. It was thought that money could be made from the "ivory" of its bones and they began to cut it apart on the beach.

Eventually, they informed the municipal president of Tecolutla, César Guerrero, that it was a crashed plane. A volunteer rescue party was organized but what they found was an enormous head, with the rest of the creature partially buried. It was decided to bring the carcass to the town of Tecolutla, using a truck with a fifteen-meter platform borrowed from Mexican state oil company (PEMEX). It was placed on beach in front of the lighthouse, and photographs were taken.

Word of the discovery and mystery of the washed-up creature spread and many people came to see the carcass. It was recommended to bury the creature, which was decomposing rapidly, but the mayor of Tecolutla refused, and kept it as a tourist attraction in spite of the odor.

The Marine Museum which was reopened in 1997 after being closed for a number of years. Besides the bones of the "monster", there are also paintings of the monster in the museum. Despite this, few nowadays in Tecolutla know about the monster. Most witnesses from the time have moved away or have died. There are no local newspapers in Tecolutla and the nearest publication in Poza Rica did not keep papers from the time period. The city government does not have records, and only a few photographs survive.

== The municipality ==
The municipality of Tecolutla is located in the north of Veracruz state in a region known as Totonacapan. Most of the municipality's borders are defined by the Tecolutla River and the Gulf of Mexico. The municipality contains 375 communities(inegi) and has a surface area of 471.31 km^{2} (181.97 sq mi) and an average altitude of ten meters above sea level. It borders the municipalities of Papantla, Martínez de la Torre, and Gutiérrez Zamora with the Gulf of Mexico to the east. The climate is hot with average rainfall for Mexico with an average temperature of 23.6 °C. The area is suited to fast-growing trees with soft wood such as guarumbo, chancarro, jonote, guanacaxtle and sangrado.

Much of the municipality is rural, with agriculture and livestock as the economic basis. Important crops grown here include corn, green chiles, beans, "platano roatan" (a species of banana), vanilla, sugar cane, tobacco, pineapple, oranges, limes, grapefruit, mandarin oranges and coconuts. Livestock raising includes dairy and beef cattle, pigs, sheep, fowl and bees. Second is fishing with only a fraction of the municipality's land developed. Fishing here is developed by way of cooperations, harvesting common bass (mojarra), crabs, shrimp, oyster, shad and sea bass. One native crop is the growing of vanilla beans. They have been grown here since far into pre-Hispanic times and they were sent to the Aztecs as tribute. Harvest time is November and December and one can see the beans drying in the sun.

The developed areas, basically the town of Tecolutla, also rely on tourism, mostly in the way of hotels and other lodges as well as restaurants.

The population of the municipality in 2020 was 24,551 with only 5,432 living in the city proper. There is still a definite Totonac presence here. About 6% of the population speaks Totonac. These people can be spotted by their distinctive dress. The men wear white, wide-leg trousers, gathered to a tight cuff above the ankle and a loose white shirt, gathered from a yoke, which sometimes has a small cape at the back. The women wear embroidered blouses and lacy skirts, both in white. Over the skirt, they wear a brightly colored half-apron. They also wear a brightly colored scarf similar to a quechquemitl. This is tied at the back of the neck, draped over the chest and then tucked into the apron.
