= José Manuel del Río =

Mexican politician

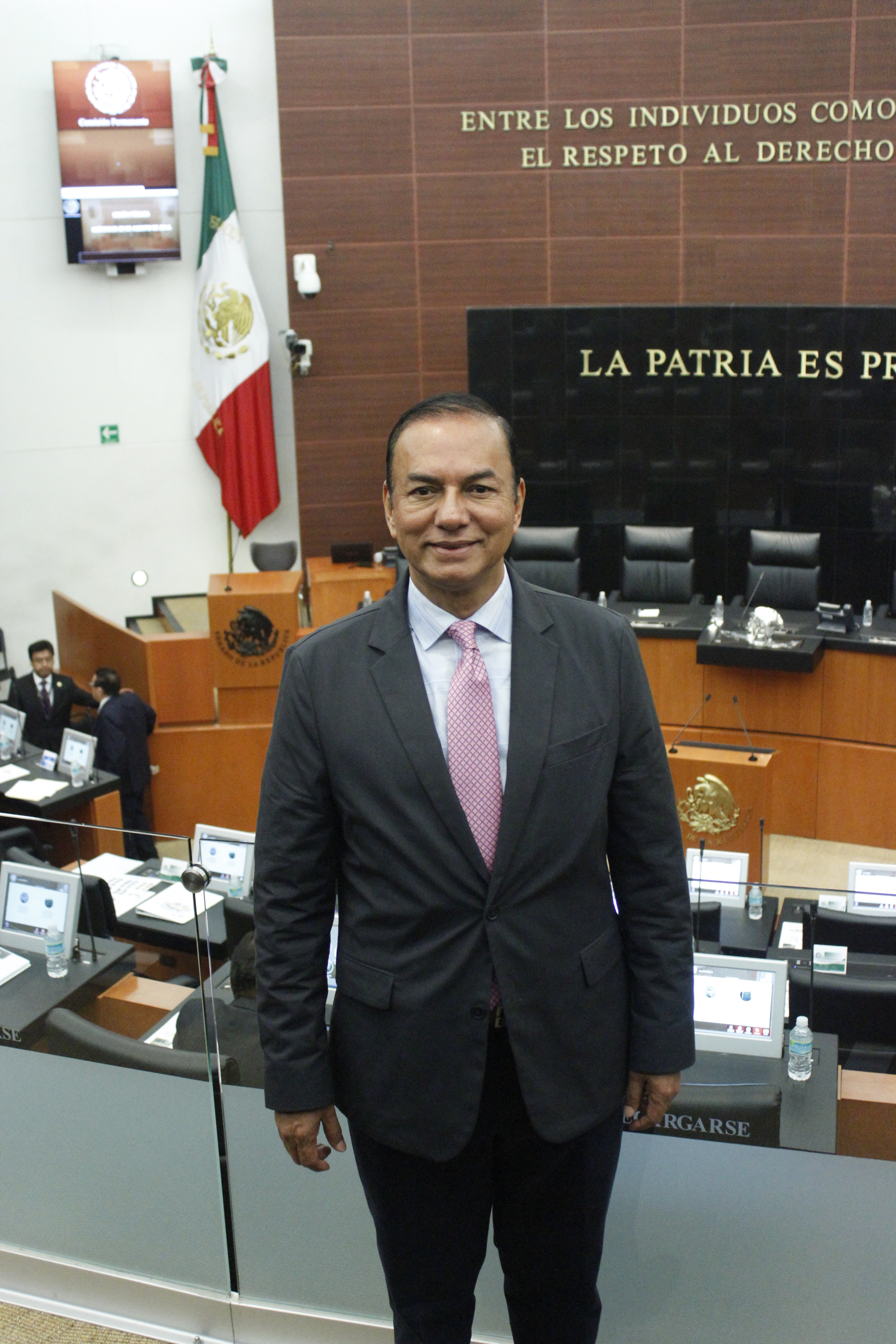
José Manuel del Río Virgen

José Manuel del Río Virgen (born 8 January 1954) is a Mexican politician affiliated with Convergence who served in the lower house of the Congress from 2000 to 2003 and again from 2006 to 2009.

Born in Córdoba, Veracruz, he studied economics at the Instituto Politécnico Nacional (IPN).

== Political career ==
Del Río Virgen is a member and founder of Convergence who has occupied different positions in the public service. In 2000 he was elected to serve as federal deputy during the 58th Congress. In 2004 he was elected municipal president (mayor) of Tecolutla but left that position in 2006 to run for a seat in the Chamber of Deputies; he won the election to become the federal deputy representing the sixth district of Veracruz during the 60th Congress.
