= Costa Esmeralda =

Stretch of beaches on the eastern coast of Mexico

The Costa Esmeralda is the stretch of beaches which runs north from Veracruz to the mouth of the Rio Tecolutla near the town of Tecolutla on the eastern coast of Mexico.
