= Tecolutla River =

- Estuary near the town of Tecolutla
- Etymology: Classical Nahuatl: tecolotl, "owl" + lan, "place"
- Native name: Río Tecolutla (Spanish)

Location
- Country: Mexico
- State: Veracruz

Physical characteristics
- Source: Confluence of the Necaxa and Apulco Rivers
  - location: Espinal, Veracruz, Mexico
  - coordinates: 20.242°N 97.439°W
- Mouth: Gulf of Mexico
  - location: Tecolutla, Veracruz, Mexico
  - coordinates: 20.475°N 97.000°W
- Length: 375 km (233 mi) (Note: Includes length of tributaries)
- Basin size: 7,903 km^{2} (3,051 sq mi)

The Tecolutla River is a river in the state of Veracruz in Mexico, and the main drainage of the historical and cultural region of Totonacapan. It is principally fed by four rivers that rise in the Sierra Norte de Puebla: from north to south, they are the Necaxa, the Lajajalpan (or Laxaxalpan), the Tecuantepec and the Apulco. These rivers converge in the municipality of Espinal, Veracruz, and from here the Tecolutla flows about 100 kilometres (62 mi) east through the coastal plain and the municipalities of Papantla and Gutiérrez Zamora to its mouth at the town of Tecolutla on the Gulf of Mexico, On its south bank the Tecolutla receives the Joloapan River near Paso del Correo, and the Chichicatzapan River via the Ostiones estuary near its mouth.

The furthest source of the Tecolutla is the Arroyo Zapata, located 20 kilometres (12 mi) north of Huamantla, Tlaxcala at an elevation of 3,500 metres (11,500 ft). This arroyo flows into the Coyuca River, which in turn drains into the Apulco. The total length of the river measured from this source is 375 kilometres (233 mi). The watershed drained by the Tecolutla covers an area of 7,903 square kilometres (3,051 sq mi) and has a mean natural surface runoff of 6,098 hm^{3} (2.153×10^{11} cu ft) per year.

The first important hydroelectric facilities in Mexico were built in the Tecolutla watershed on the Necaxa River. Nevertheless, the Tecolutla is considered one of the most well-preserved rivers in the state of Veracruz and its floodplains are agriculturally productive. Vanilla may have been first cultivated by the Totonac in this area and has been an important part of their culture for centuries. In general, the Tecolutla River Basin provided a strong foundation for the development of a relatively prosperous indigenous agriculture environment. This was because of a variety of factors such as its year long warm temperature, strong winds, and its rainfall patterns that allow for two crops of maize a year to be obtained without the assistance of irrigation.
