= Bonifacio Castillo Cruz =

Mexican politician (born 1964)

- Born: 1 November 1964 (age 61); Carrizal, Veracruz, Mexico
- Education: Universidad Veracruzana
- Occupation: Politician
- Political party: Morena
- Other political affiliations: PT (2009–2021); PRD (–2009)

Bonifacio Castillo Cruz (born 1 November 1964) is a Mexican politician and chemical engineer. He is a member of the Labor Party (PT). He was municipal president of Papantla from 1998 to 2000 and a federal deputy for the sixth district of Veracruz in the 58th Congress (2000-2003).

He was a State and National Councilor of the Party of the Democratic Revolution (PRD), but resigned from that party in 2009. He is currently the coordinator of the PT Veracruz Organization appointed by the National Executive Committee of that Party.

== Career ==
Castillo Cruz earned a degree in chemical engineering from the Universidad Veracruzana in 1987. After finishing his professional career, he was a member of the PFCRN where he worked as an electoral propaganda distributor and fence painter in the city of Papantla promoting the candidacy of Rafael Aguilar Talamantes during the 1994 presidential election, he was also caretaker of Casilla of the PFCRN. 2 years later in 1996 he was president of the Organization of Papanteca Indigenous Communities (OCIP) where he defended the indigenous people of the Sierra Papanteca.

Castillo Cruz was elected the municipal president of his native Papantla in 1998 as a member of the Party of the Democratic Revolution (PRD). However, he was accused of embezzling MXN$4 million and his tenure was characterized by a tense relationship with the Veracruz state government. Castillo Cruz obtained a license to seek the candidacy for the Federal Council, and in the 2000 elections with 43,118 votes, the Federal Council won and became the First Left Federal Deputy of District VI Papantla of the Coalition Alianza por México. In the 2003 elections, he was a pre-candidate for the PRD nomination for Governor of Veracruz.

That year, he entered the Council of State of the PRD in the state of Veracruz and was elected National Councilor of the Party, moving to Mexico City to join the PRD National Council until 2006. In 2006 the Broad Progressive Front appointed him Representative of the Government Legitimate of AMLO. A year later in 2007 he was appointed National Delegate of the PRD representing Veracruz. Castillo, due to the internal problems of the PRD, resigned his membership in 2009 to join the Labor Party (PT) where he served as Coordinator of the Juntos Haremos Historia coalition in 2018. He served as Organization Coordinator of the PT in the city of Papantla in 2021, which placed him as a Candidate for Local Deputy for District VI with head in the city of Papantla, resulting in the winner of the election on June 6, 2021, for which he becomes an Elected Local Deputy.

Once in office, Castillo Cruz switched his party affiliation, leaving the PT to join Morena in November 2021.

== Personal life ==
Castillo Cruz was born in Carrizal, Papantla Municipality, Veracruz. He was arrested in November 2003 on embezzlement charges related to his term as municipal president. Castillo Cruz, who was imprisoned for 10 months, dismissed the charges as political persecution by Governor Miguel Alemán Velasco, whom he had tense relationship with as municipal president due to his support for the indigenous community.
