= Rómulo Salazar Macías =

Mexican politician

- Born: 12 February 1951 (age 75); Papantla, Veracruz, Mexico
- Occupation: Politician
- Political party: PRI

Rómulo Isael Salazar Macías (born 12 February 1951) is a Mexican politician affiliated with the Institutional Revolutionary Party (PRI). In the 2003 mid-terms he was elected to the Chamber of Deputies to represent the sixth district of Veracruz during the 59th Congress.
