= Francisco Herrera Jiménez =

Mexican politician

- Born: 29 January 1965 (age 61); Misantla, Veracruz, Mexico
- Occupation: Politician
- Political party: PRI

Francisco Herrera Jiménez (born 29 January 1965) is a Mexican politician from the Institutional Revolutionary Party. In the 2009 mid-terms he was elected to the Chamber of Deputies to represent the sixth district of Veracruz during the 61st Congress. He previously served as a local deputy in the Congress of Veracruz and as municipal president of Papantla.
