= Mecatlán =

- Municipality
- Location of Mecatlán within Mexico
- Coordinates: 20°13′N 97°01′W
- Country: Mexico
- State: Veracruz

Government
  - Municipal President: Miguel González Antonio

Area
  - Total: 48.5 km^{2} (18.7 sq mi)

Population
  - Total: 11 256
  - Density: 232.08/km^{2} (601.1/sq mi)
- Time zone: UTC-6 (CST)
- Website: Official Website

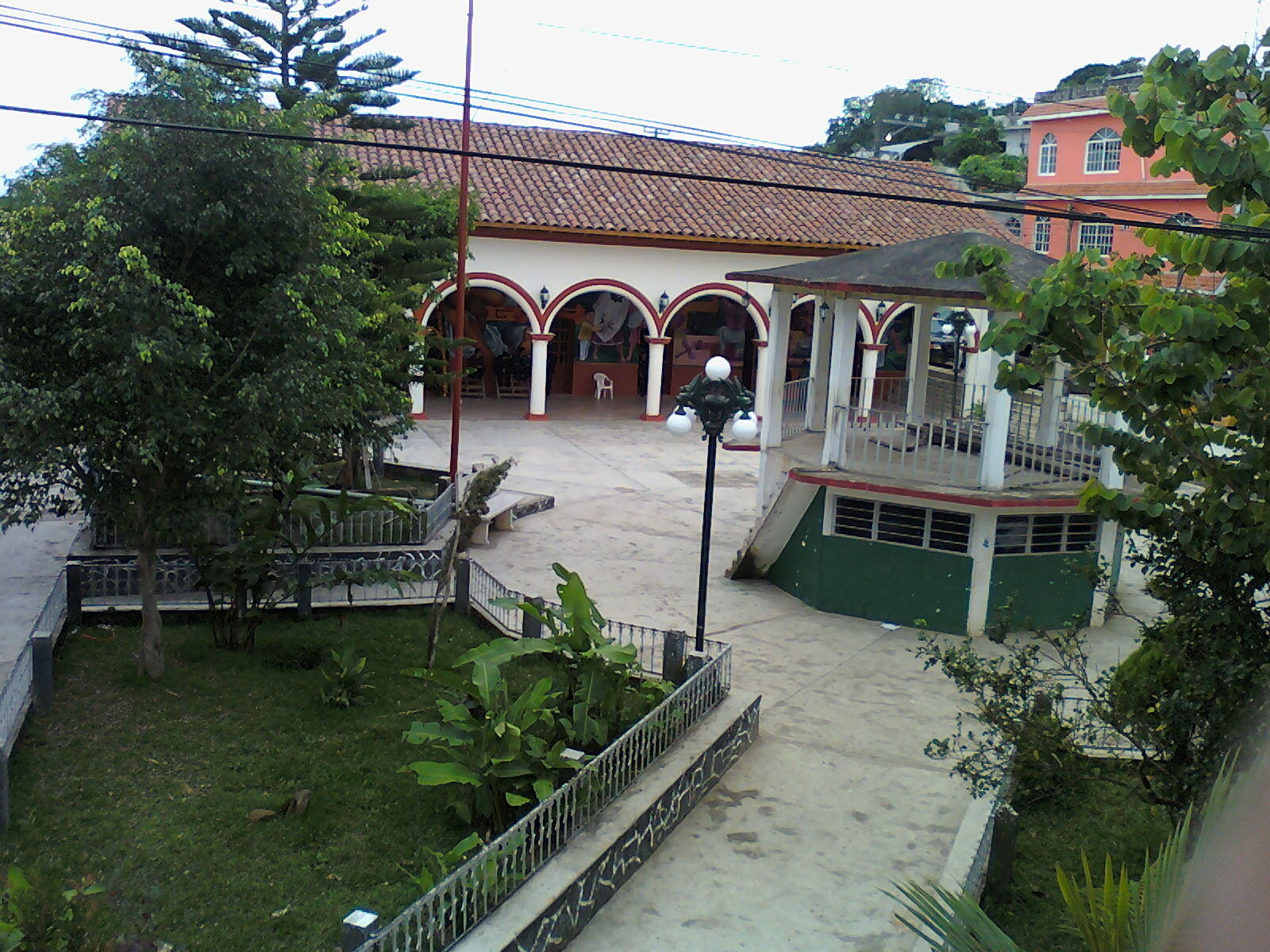
Park and municipal palace in the center of Mecatlán, Veracruz, Mexico.

Mecatlán is a municipality in the Mexican state of Veracruz. It is located in the north zone of the state, about 327 km from the state capital Xalapa. It has an area of 48.53 km^{2}. It is located at 20°13′N 97°41′W.

Mecatlán is delimited to the north by Coyutla, to the north-east by Chumatlan, to the north-west by Coahuitlan to the south-east by Coxquihui and to the south-west by Filomeno Mata.

According to the INEGI official statistics, in 2020 year the total population in Mecatlán was about 12,799 persons (49.2% men and 50.8% women). Compared with the 2010 year, the total population has grown about an 8.39%. It produces principally maize and coffee.

In Mecatlán, in September there is a celebration in honor of archangel Michael, patron of the town.

The weather in Mecatlán is warm all year, with rains in summer and autumn.
