= Alma Arroyo Ruiz =

Mexican politician (born 1975)

- Born: 27 November 1975 (age 50); Papantla, Veracruz, Mexico
- Occupation: Deputy
- Political party: PRI

Alma Jeanny Arroyo Ruiz (born 27 November 1975) is a Mexican politician affiliated with the PRI. She currently serves as Deputy of the LXII Legislature of the Mexican Congress representing Veracruz.
