= Coxquihui =

Municipality in Veracruz, Mexico

- Municipality
- Location in Mexico Coxquihui (Mexico)
- Country: Mexico
- State: Veracruz
- Demonym: (in Spanish)
- Time zone: UTC−6 (CST)

Coxquihui is a municipality in the Mexican state of Veracruz. It is located in montane central zone of the state, about 95 km from Xalapa, the state capital. It has a surface of 86.37 km^{2}. It is located at 20°11′N 97°35′W.

== Geography ==
The municipality is delimited to the north by Chumatlan, to the east by Espinal, to the south by Zozocolco de Hidalgo, to the south-west by Puebla State and to the west by Mecatlán.

The weather in Coxquihui is warm-medium all year with rains in summer and autumn.

== Economy ==
It produces principally maize, beans and chili pepper.

== Culture ==
A celebration in honor of San Mateo, patron of the town, takes place in September.
