= Coahuitlán =

Municipality in Veracruz, Mexico

- Municipality
- Location in Veracruz Coahuitlán (Mexico)
- Coordinates: 20°17′30″N 97°41′50″W
- Country: Mexico
- State: Veracruz
- Region: Totonaca Region
- Seat: Progreso de Zaragoza

Area
  - Total: 51 km^{2} (20 sq mi)
- Elevation: 184 m (604 ft)

Population
  - Total: 8,294

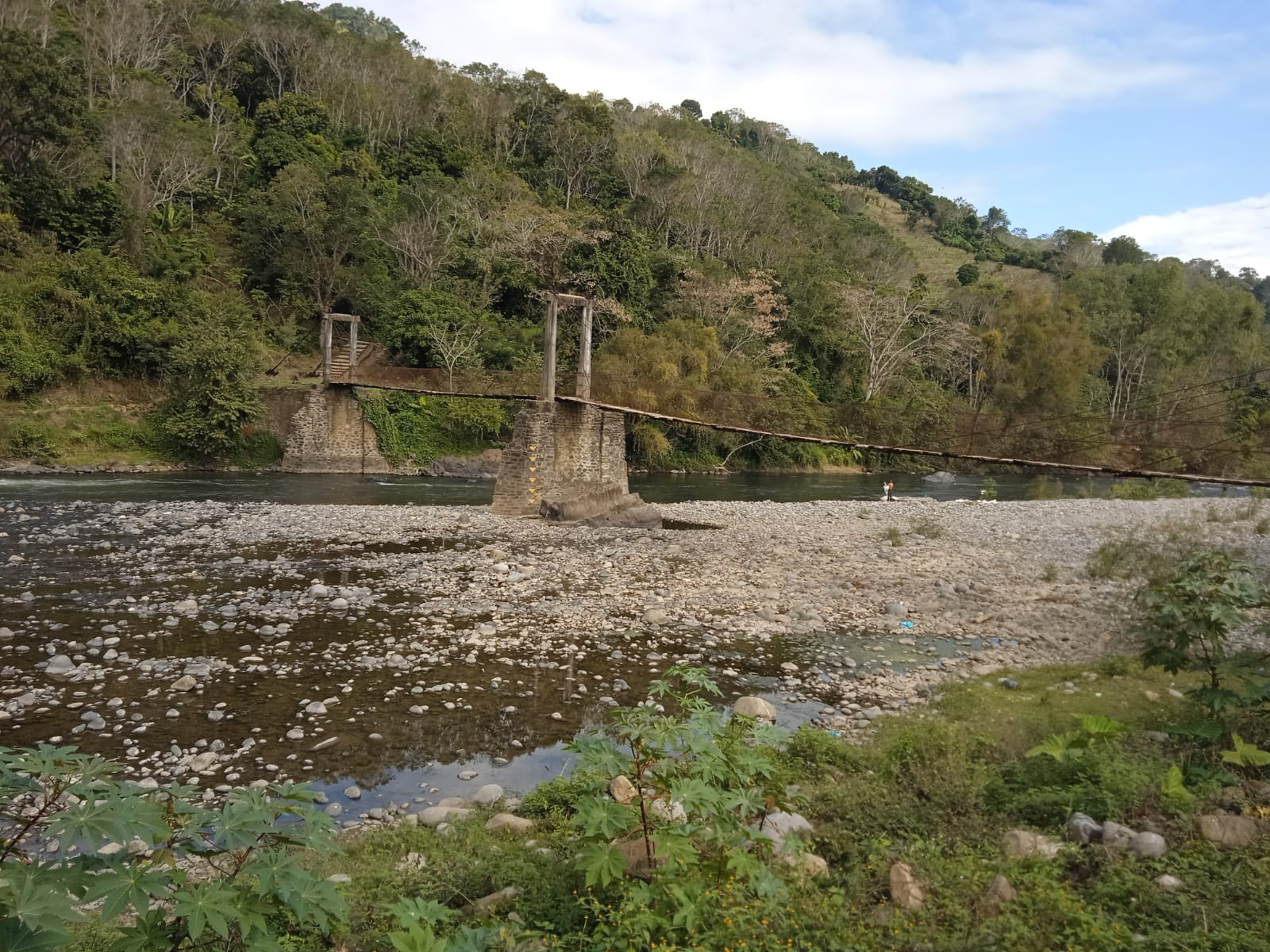
Suspension bridge seen from afar in the town of Progreso de Zaragoza, Coahuitlán Municipality, Veracruz.

Coahuitlán is a municipality in the Mexican state of Veracruz. It is in the north zone of the state, about 120 km (75 mi) from Xalapa, the state capital. It has a surface of 95.41 km^{2} (36.84 sq mi). It is at 20°16′N 97°43′W.

Coahuitlán is delimited to the north and to the east by Coyutla, to the south-east by Chumatlan, to the south by Filomeno Mata and to the west by Puebla State.

Due to the weather, which is warm all year and rains in summer, the main production is of maize and beans.

In Coahuitlán, in March and April, a celebration in honor of Santo Entierro takes place.
