= Zozocolco de Hidalgo =

- Municipality and town
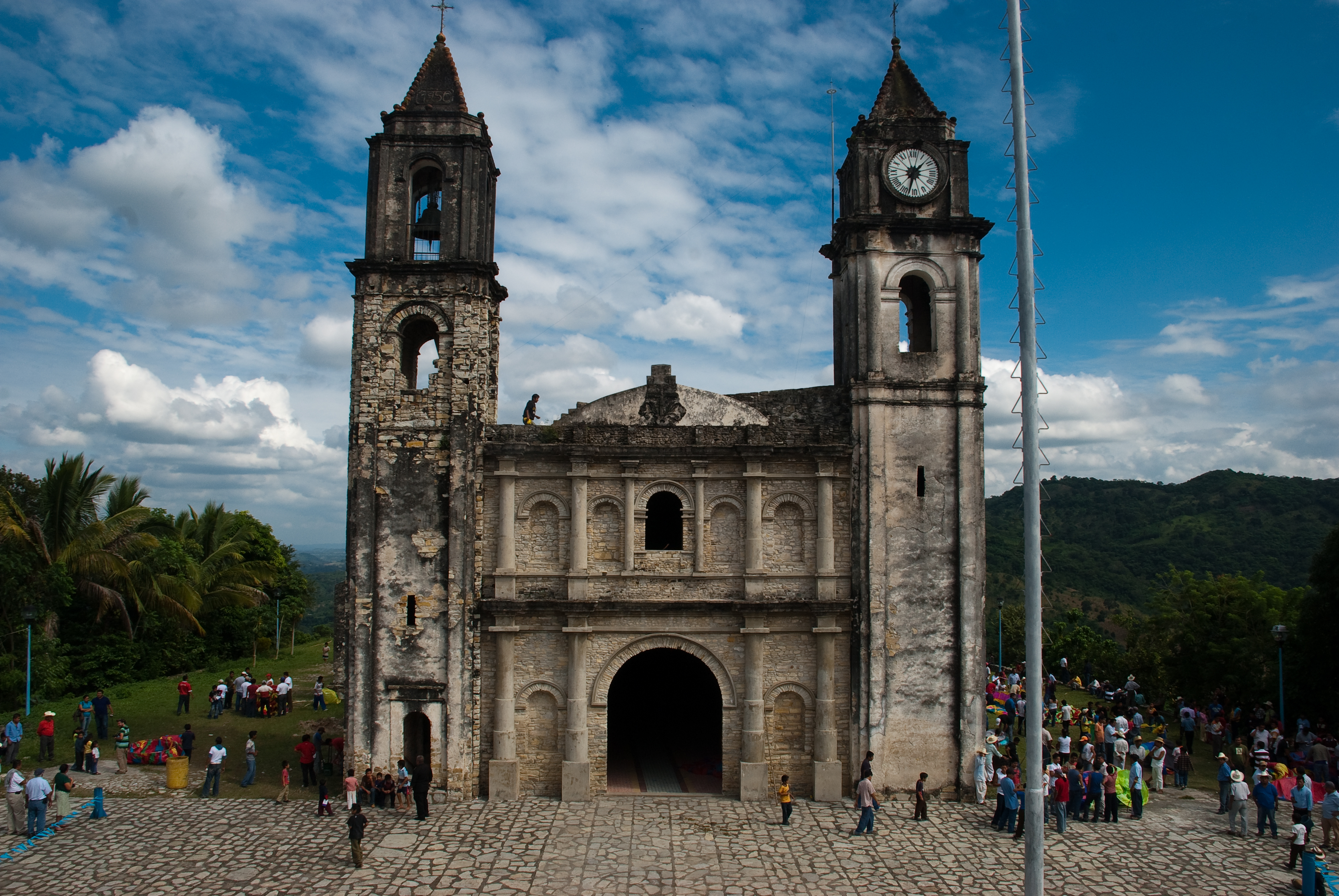
- San Miguel Arcángel Church

- Location within Veracruz Location within Mexico
- Coordinates: 20°08′N 97°35′W
- Country: Mexico
- State: Veracruz

Government
  - Mayor: Esaú Hernández² (PAN)

Area
  - Total: 106.11 km^{2} (40.97 sq mi)

Population (2020)
  - Total: 14,254
  - Seat: 3,794
- Time zone: UTC-6 (Central Standard Time)

Historical population
| Year | Pop. | ±% |
|---|---|---|
| 1995 | 11,346 | — |
| 2000 | 12,607 | +11.1% |
| 2005 | 12,455 | −1.2% |
| 2010 | 13,434 | +7.9% |
| 2015 | 15,031 | +11.9% |
| 2020 | 14,524 | −3.4% |

Zozocolco de Hidalgo is a municipality located in northwest of the Mexican state of Veracruz, about 100 kilometres (60 mi) from the state capital Xalapa. It has a surface area of 106.11 square kilometres (40.97 mi^{2}) and is located at 20°08′N 97°35′W.

== Name ==
The name comes from the Nahuatl languages: Xoxo-colco, which means "In the potter of clay".

== Geography ==
The municipality of Zozocolco is bordered to the north by Coxquihui, to the east by Gulf of Mexico, to the northeast by Espinal, and to the west, south and southeast by Puebla.

=== Climate ===
The climate in Zozocolco is warm-humid with an average temperature of 22 °C (72 °F), with rains in summer and autumn.

== Agriculture ==
It produces principally maize, beans and coffee.

== Celebrations ==
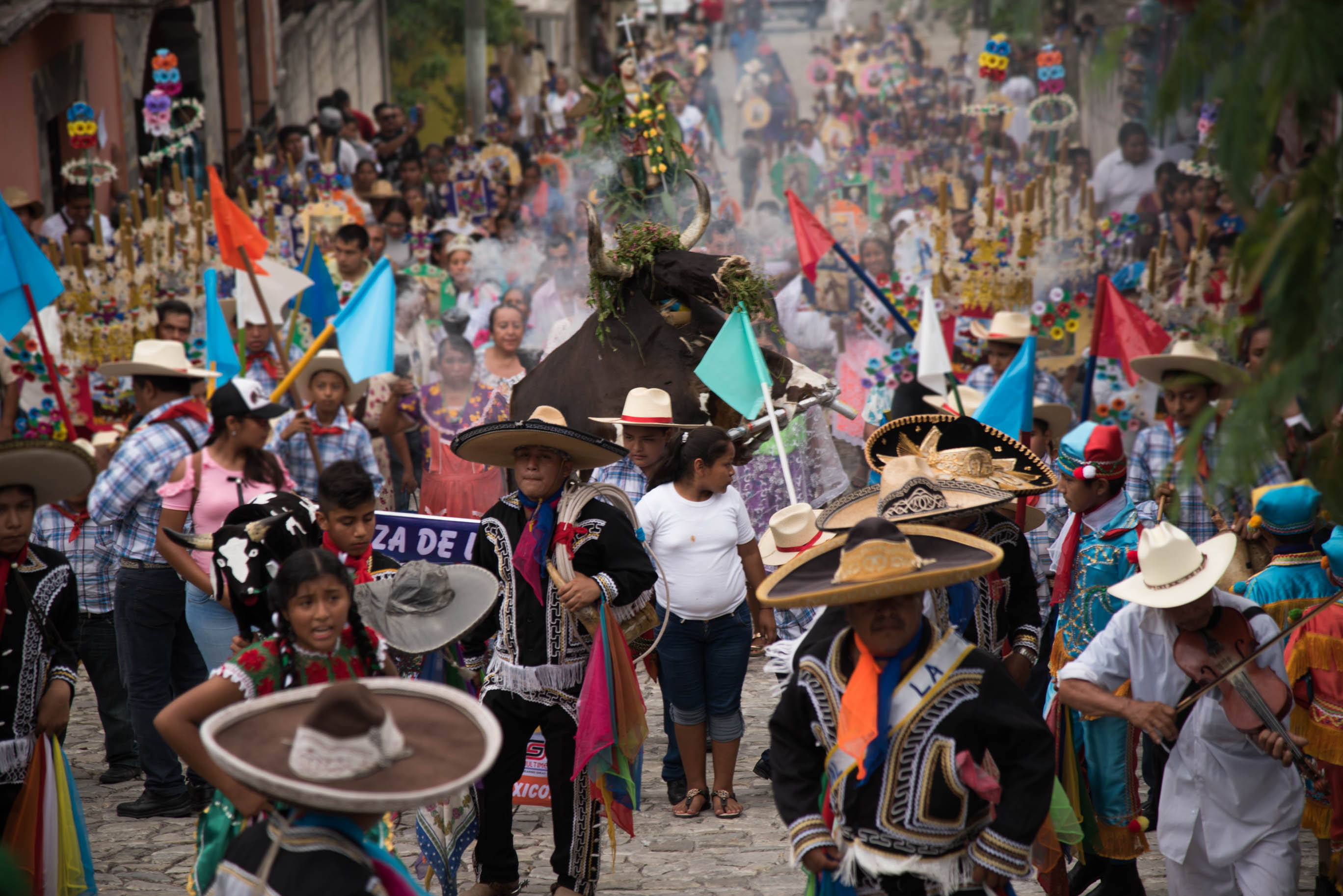
San Miguel Arcángel festival at september

Every September, a festival is held to celebrate St Michael (San Miguel), patron of the town, and in December there is a festival held in honor of Our Lady of Guadalupe.
