= Filomeno Mata =

- Municipality
- Location within Veracruz Location within Mexico
- Coordinates: 20°12′N 97°42′W
- Country: Mexico
- State: Veracruz

Government
  - Municipal President: Petronila Jerónimo García

Area
  - Total: 62.5 km^{2} (24.1 sq mi)

Population
  - Total: 14 426
  - Density: 230.82/km^{2} (597.8/sq mi)
- Time zone: UTC-6 (CST)
- Website: Official Website

Filomeno Mata is a town and municipality in the Mexican state of Veracruz. It is located in central zone of the state, about 298 km from Xalapa, the state capital. It has a surface of 62.51 km^{2}. It is located at 20°12′N 97°42′W.

== Geography ==
The municipality of Filomeno Mata is delimited to the north by Coahuitlan, to the north-east by Mecatlán, to the south and to the west by Puebla State.

The weather in Filomeno Mata is warm-medium all year with rains in summer and autumn.

== Economy ==
It produces principally maize and coffee.

== Culture ==
In Filomeno Mata, in August takes place the celebration in honor to Santa Rosa de Lima, Patron of the town.
