= Coyutla =

- Municipality
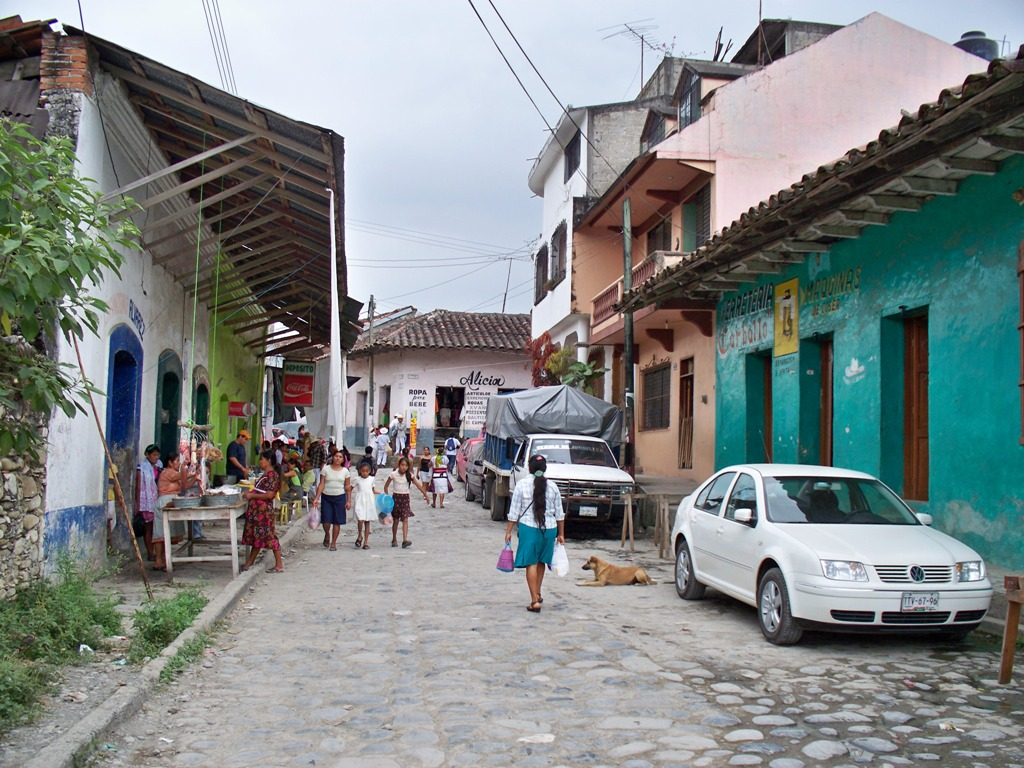

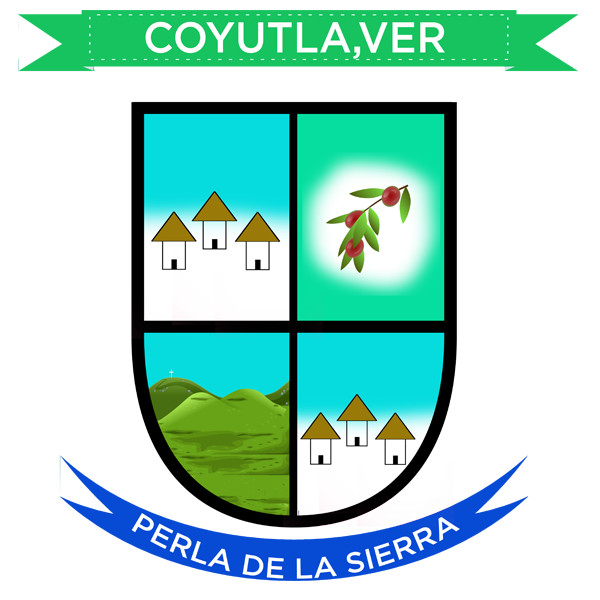
- Coat of arms

- Location of Coyutla within Mexico
- Coordinates: 20°15′N 97°39′W
- Country: Mexico
- State: Veracruz

Government
  - Municipal President: Florencio Sosa Candanedo

Area
  - Total: 312.6 km^{2} (120.7 sq mi)

Population
  - Total: 20 843
  - Density: 66.68/km^{2} (172.7/sq mi)
- Time zone: UTC-6 (CST)

Coyutla is a municipality in the Mexican state of Veracruz. It is located in central zone of the state, about 110 km from state capital Xalapa. It has a surface of 312.56 km^{2}. It is located at 20°15′N 97°39′W.

The municipality is delimited to the north and to the west by Puebla State, to the east by Espinal, to the south by Chumatlan, and to the south-west by Coahuitlan.

It produces principally maize, beans and chili pepper.

A celebration in honor of San Pedro and San Pablo, patrons of the town, takes place in June.

The weather in Coyutla is warm-medium all year with rains in summer and autumn. A river runs nearby which has attractive views.

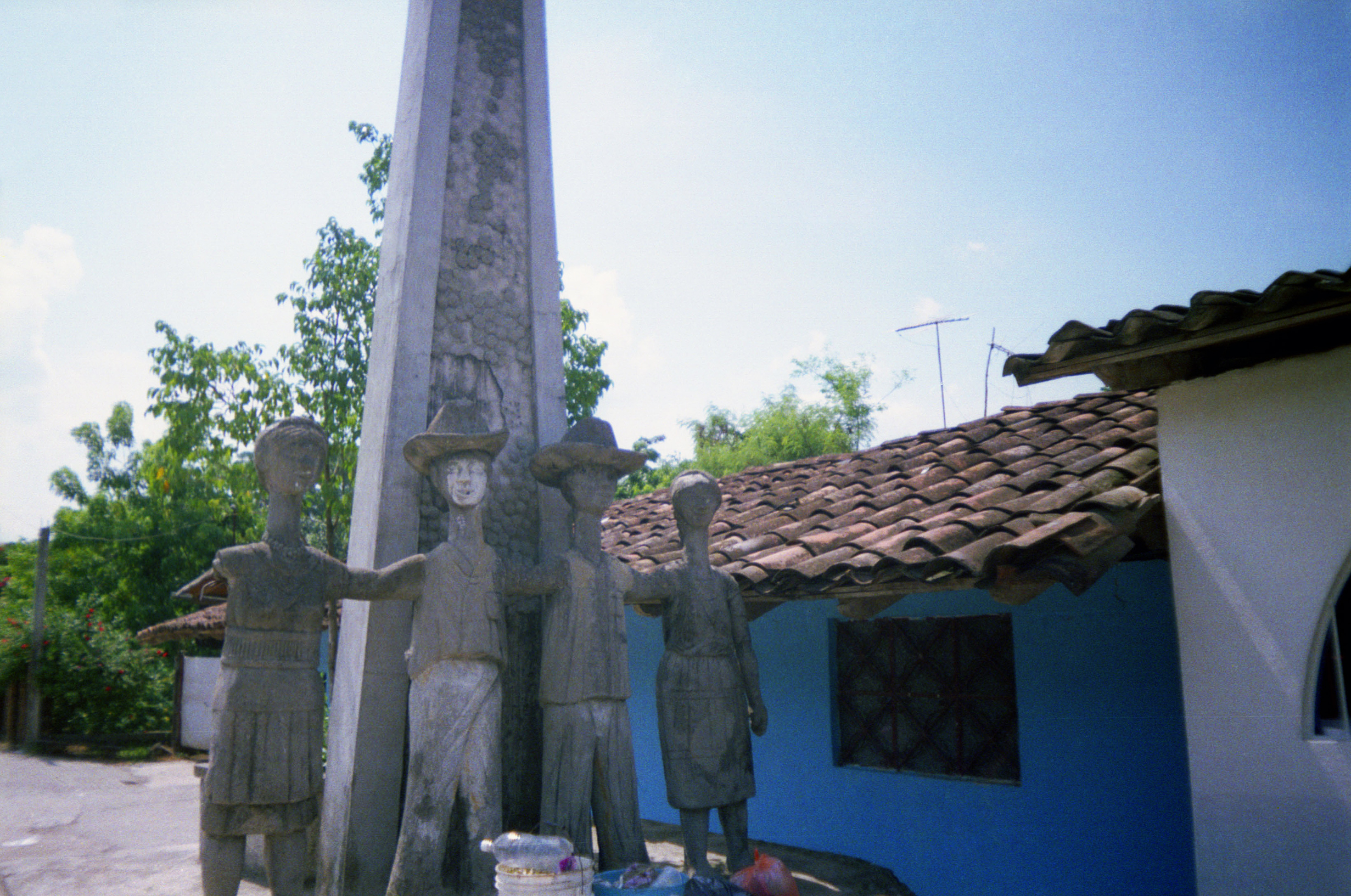
Street Figures in Coyutla, Mexico
