= Coatzintla =

- Municipality
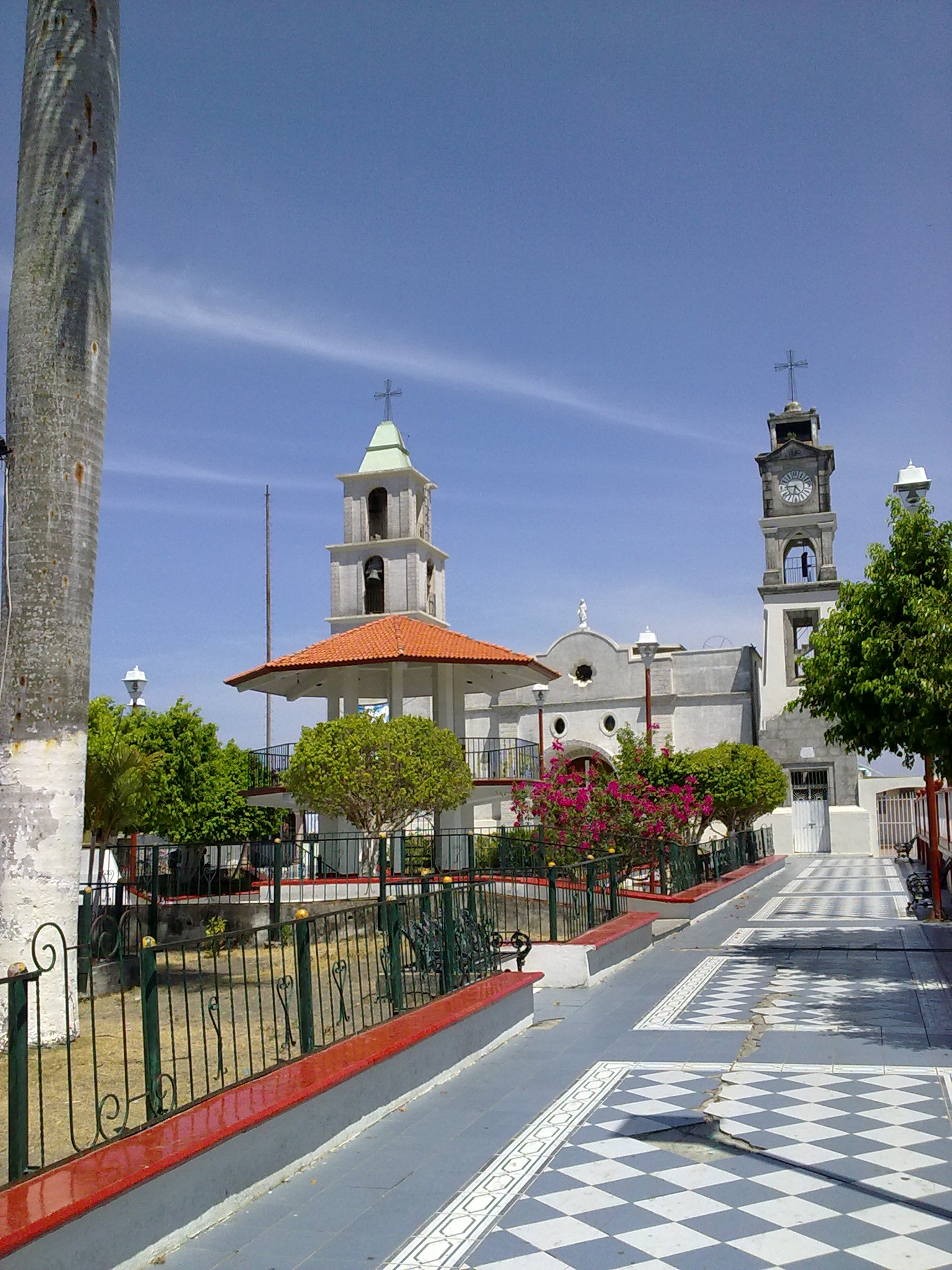
- Coatzintla main plaza

- Coat of arms

- Location within Veracruz Location within Mexico
- Coordinates: 20°29′N 97°28′W
- Country: Mexico
- State: Veracruz

Government
  - Mayor: César Ulises García Vásquez (PRD)

Area
  - Total: 277.3 km^{2} (107.1 sq mi)

Population
  - Total: 55,016
  - Density: 198.4/km^{2} (514/sq mi)
  - Seat: 34,039
- Time zone: UTC-6 (CST)
- Website: Official Website

Historical population
Year	Pop.	±%
1995	36,902	—
2000	39,189	+6.2%
2005	43,106	+10.0%
2010	48,351	+12.2%
2015	56,897	+17.7%
2020	55,016	−3.3%

Coatzintla is a municipality in the Mexican state of Veracruz. It is located in the north of state, about 120 kilometres (75 mi) from the state capital Xalapa. It covers an area of 235.25 square kilometres (90.83 mi^{2}). It is located at 20°29′N 97°28′W. As 2020 the municipality had a population of 55,016, with 34,039 in the municipal seat. Other localities includes Geovillas del Real (3,154 hab.), Manuel María Contreras (2,326 hab.), Palma Sola (1,892 hab.) and Corralillos (1,424 hab.).

The municipality of Coatzintla is delimited to the north by Tihuatlán and Poza Rica, to the east by Papantla, to the west by the state of Puebla and to the south-west by Coyutla.

It produces principally maize and potatoes.

Each July in Coatzintla a celebration is held to honor to Señor Santiago, Patron of the town.

The weather in Coatzintla is warm all year with rain in summer and autumn.
