= Cazones de Herrera =

Cazones
- Town and Municipality
- Cazones de Herrera
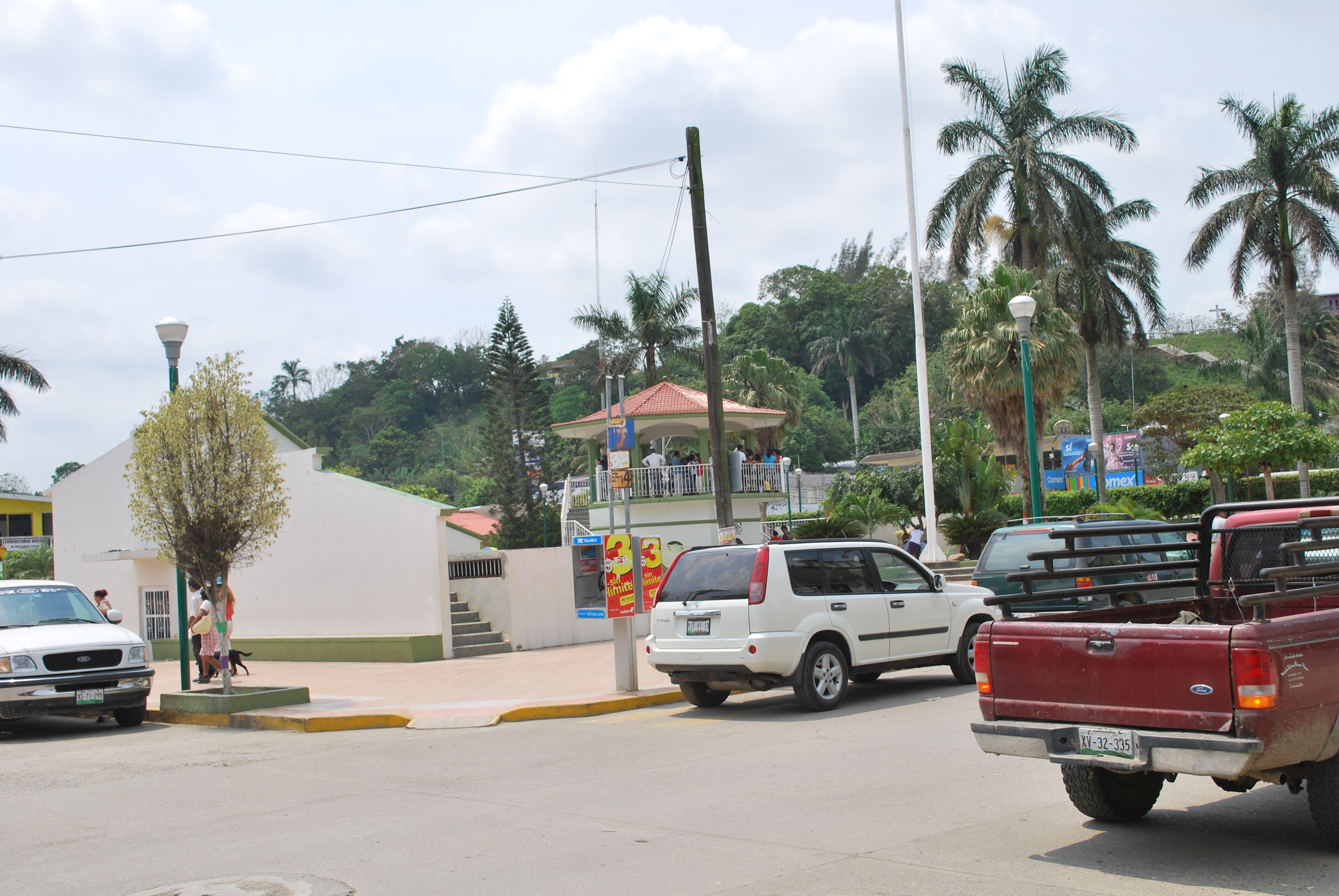
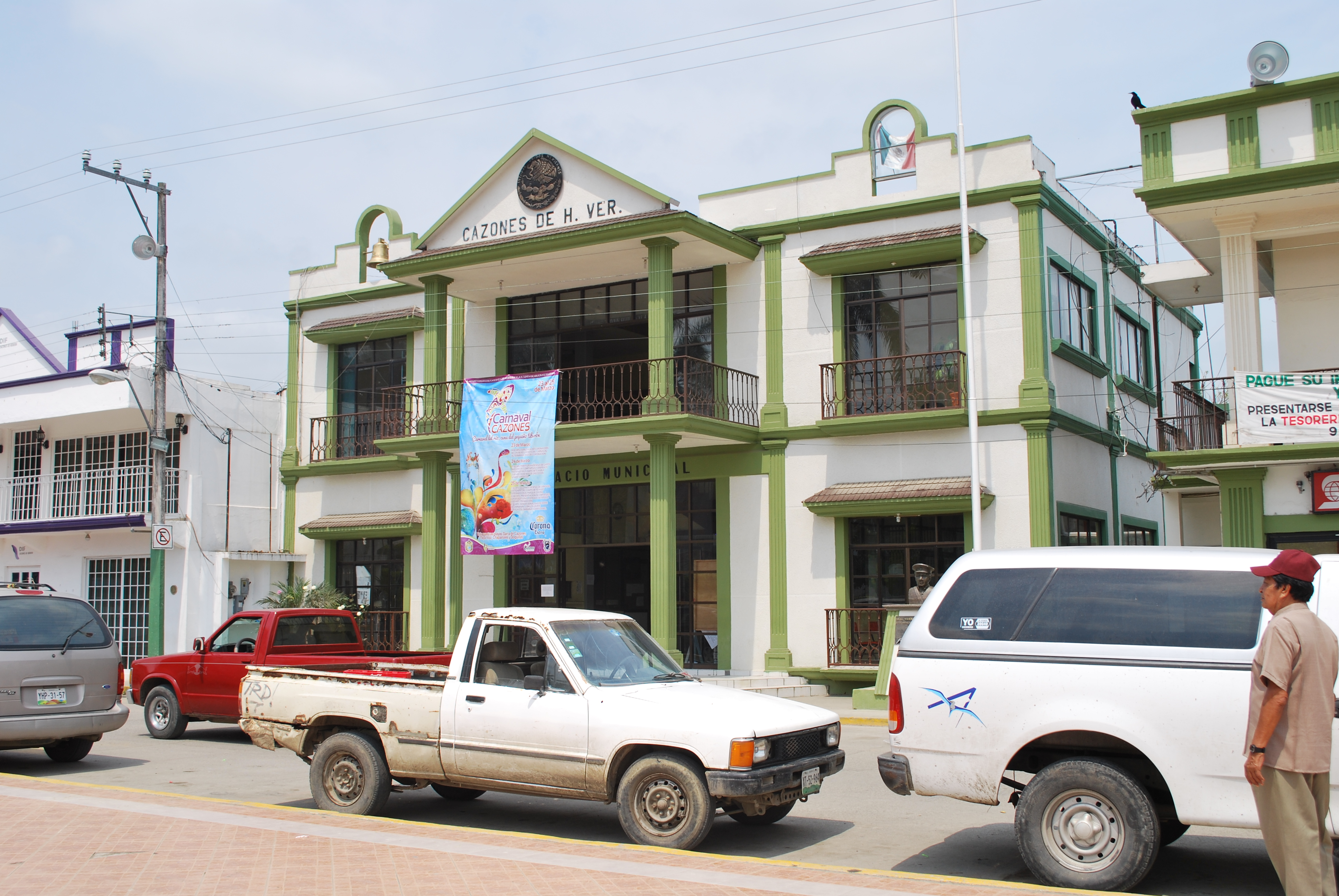
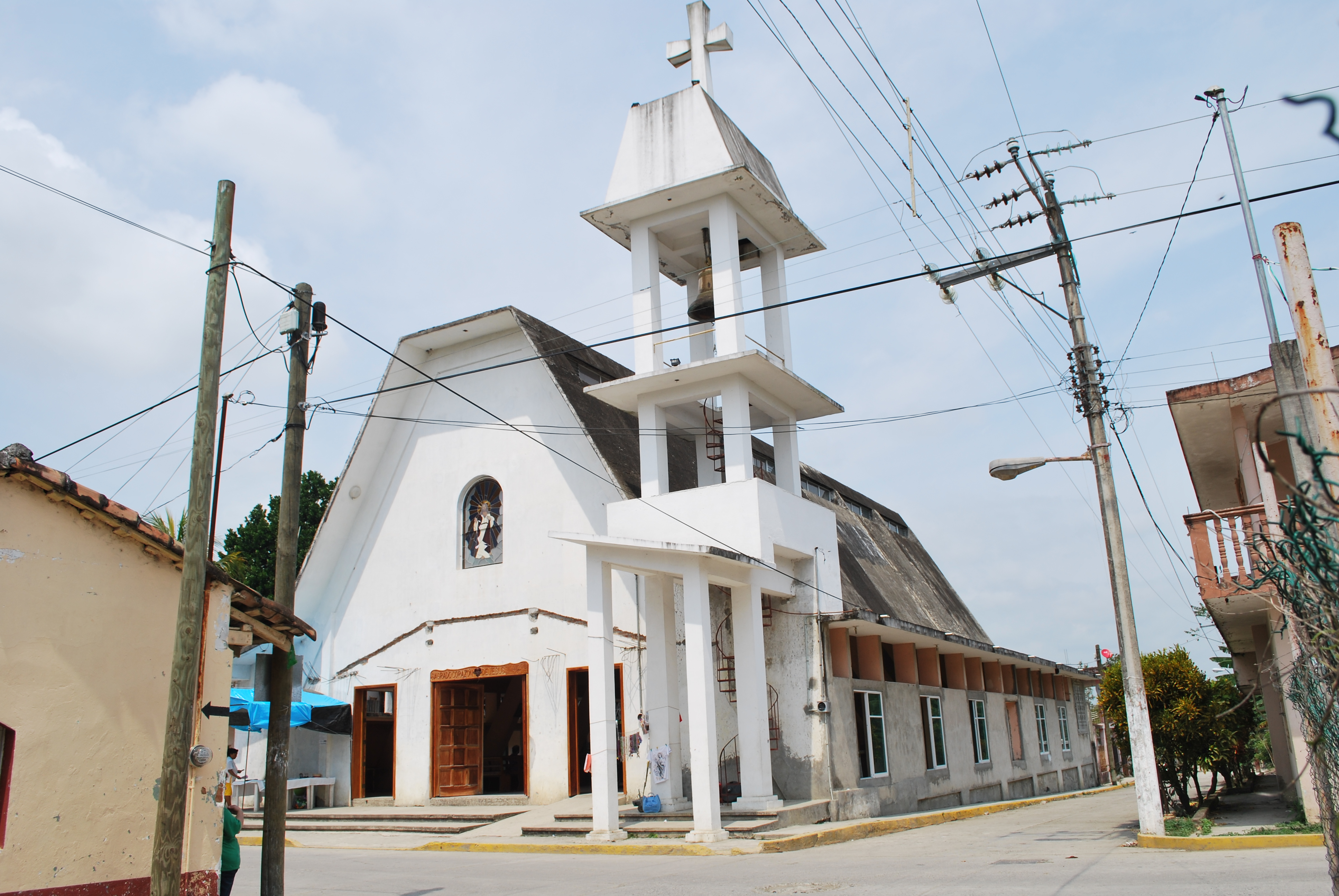
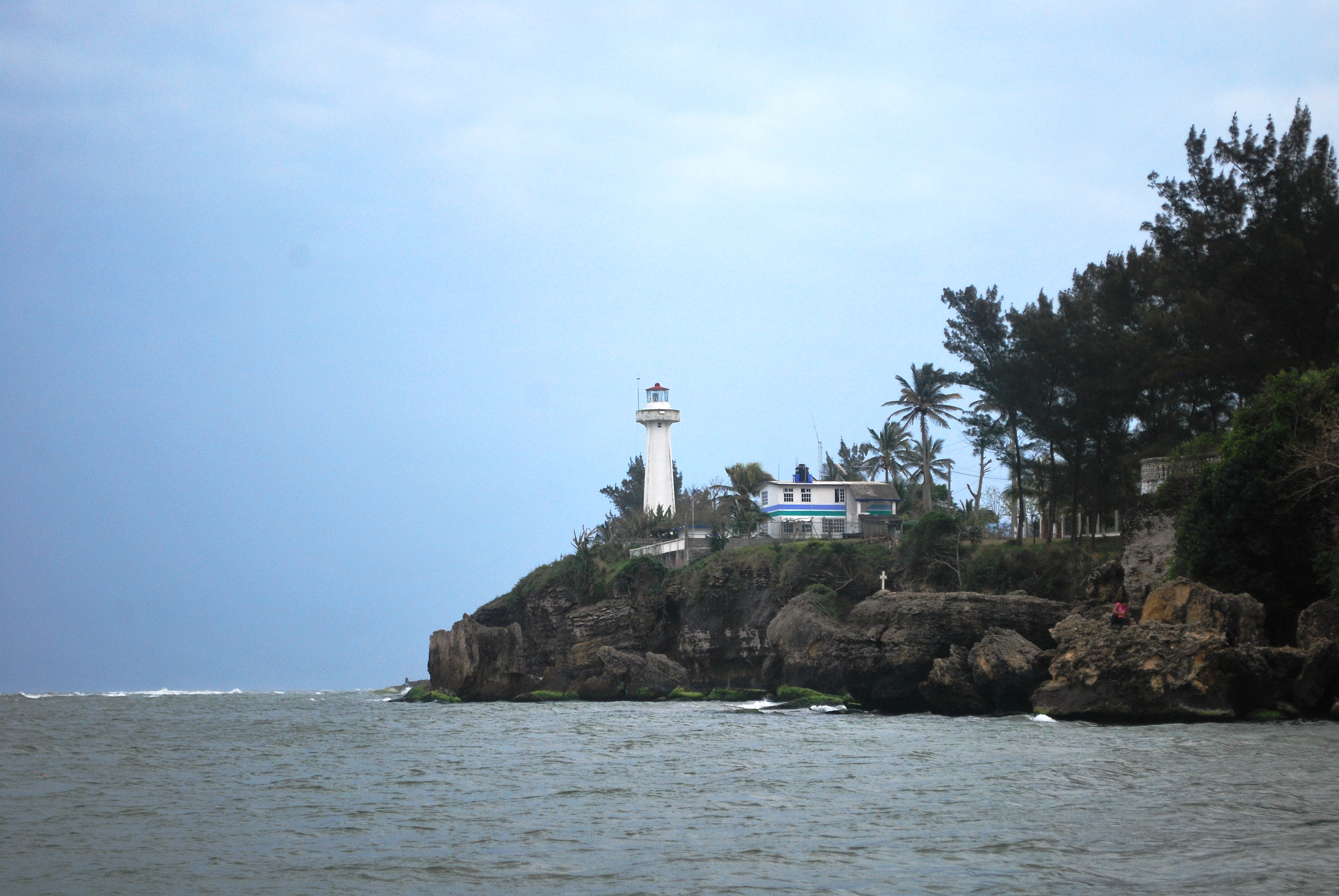
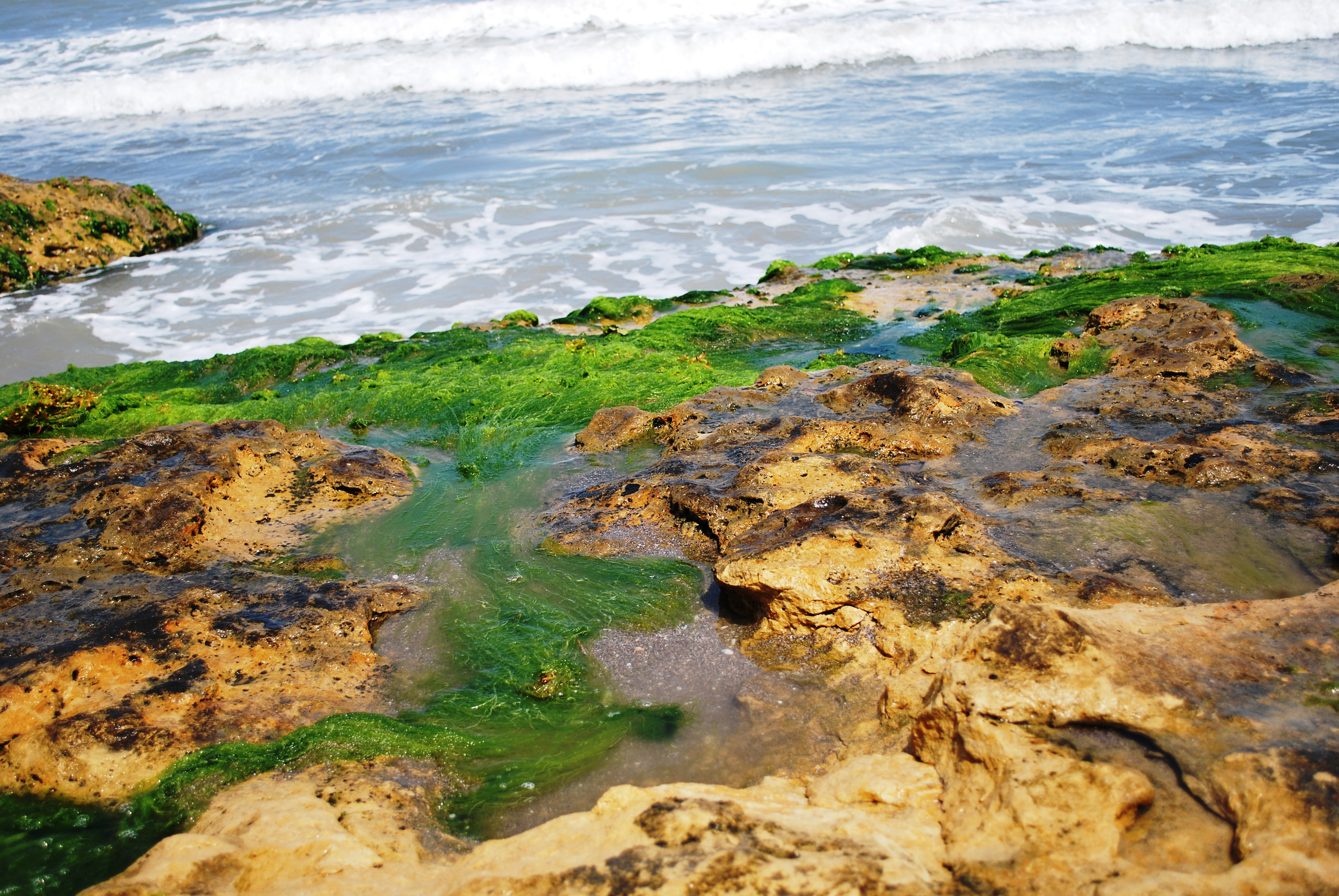
- Top: Cazones main plaza; Middle: Cazones de Herrera Municipal Hall, Sacred Heart of Jesus Church; Bottom: Cazones Lighthouse, Chaparrales Beach

- Coat of arms
- Etymology: Cazón: sharpnose shark in Mexican Spanish
- Location in Mexico Cazones (Mexico)
- Coordinates: 20°42′16″N 97°18′38″W
- Country: Mexico
- State: Veracruz
- Municipal Status: 1936

Government
  - Mayor: Miguel Ángel Uribe Toral (MC)

Area
  - Municipality: 273.1 km^{2} (105.4 sq mi)
- Elevation (of seat): 10 m (33 ft)

Population (2020) Municipality
  - Municipality: 24,421
  - Density: 89.4/km^{2} (232/sq mi)
  - Seat: 4,773
- Time zone: UTC-6 (Central (US Central))
- Postal code (of seat): 92977

Historical population
Year	Pop.	±%
1995	23,621	—
2000	23,839	+0.9%
2005	23,059	−3.3%
2010	23,483	+1.8%
2015	23,675	+0.8%
2020	24,421	+3.2%

Cazones de Herrera, or Cazones, is a town and municipality located in the north of the Mexican state of Veracruz on the Gulf of Mexico. While it has tourist attractions along its shore, especially in the Barra de Cazones area, the municipality, including the seat, has a high level of socioeconomic marginalization. Most of the municipality's population works in agriculture.

== The town ==
The town of Cazones de Herrera is 321 km from the state capital of Xalapa. It is a small town typical for the area, with a main church, main plaza, kiosk and municipal palace or government office. It is located next to the Cazones River and there is boat service from the municipal seat to communities on the other side of the river, including boats that carry vehicles. While it is the largest community in the municipality with a population of 4,773 as of 2020, it has a high level of socioeconomic marginalization.

== History ==
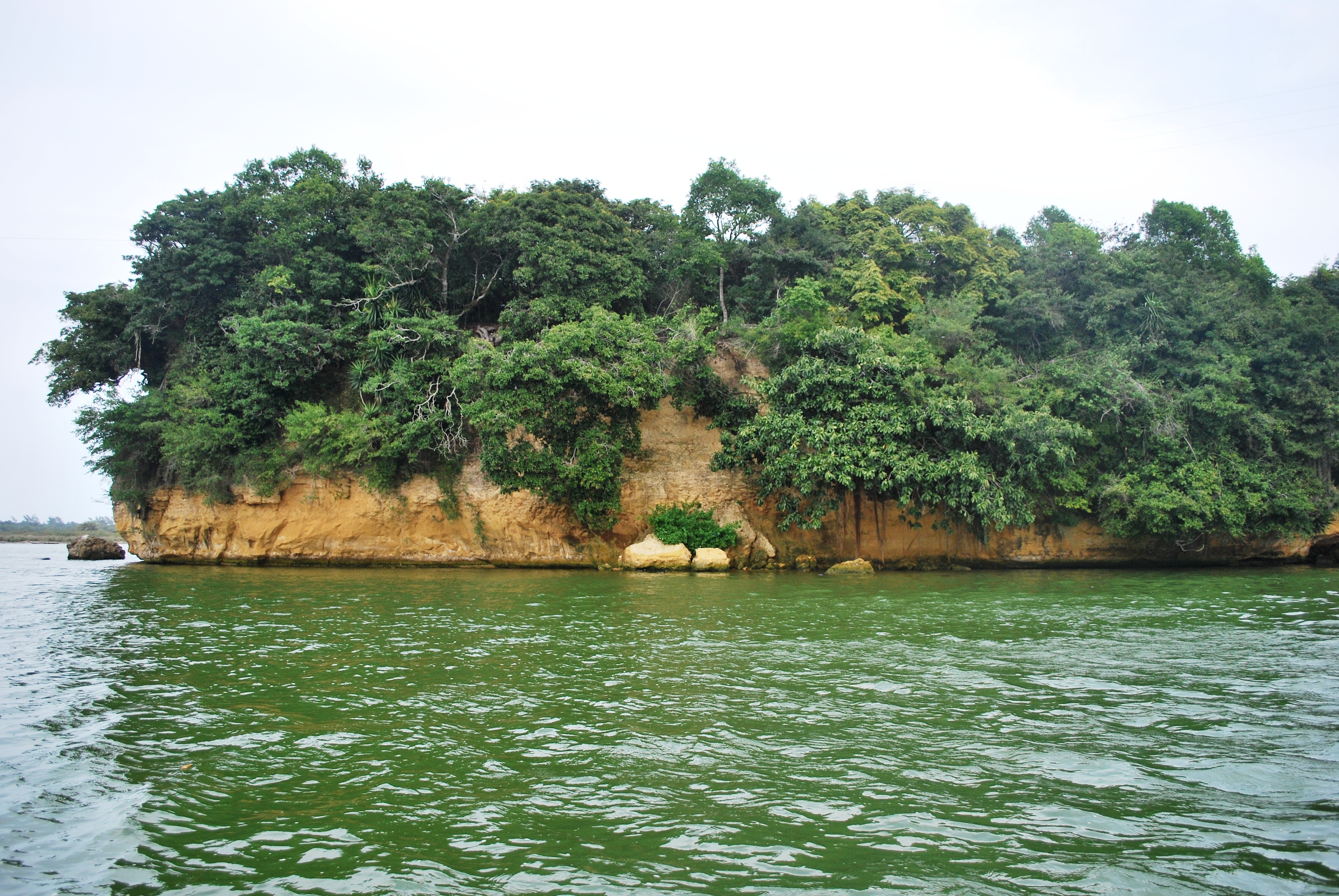
El Farallón (The Stack)

The town name comes from the Spanish word for the sharpnose shark, which used to be plentiful here. The appendage "de Herrera" is in honor of soldier and politician José Joaquín de Herrera. Its municipal seal contains elements related to the area's production of citrus fruit and corn as well as a sharpnose sharks. Other elements refer to the lands and Farallón Island at the mouth of the Cazones River.

In the pre-Hispanic period, the area was part of Totonacapan, although it came under the domination of the Aztecs in the 15th century. After the Conquest, the Totonacs came to dominate the local culture again. After Independence, the area became part of the Papantla municipality. The current municipality was created in 1936 with land that formerly belonged to the municipalities of Papantla and Tuxpan, with the settlement of Cazones designated as a town. The current official name was adopted in 1956.

== The municipality ==
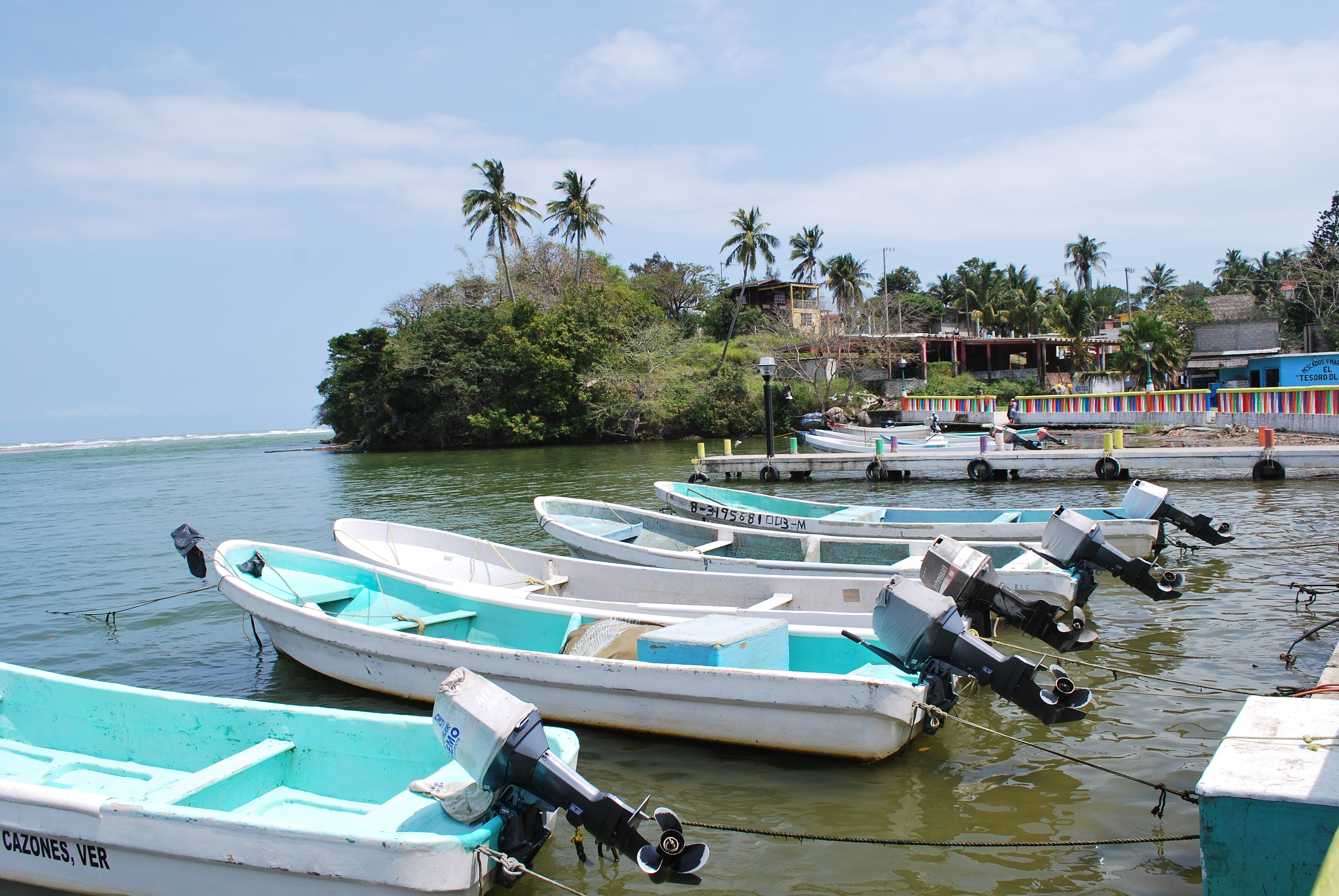
Boats on the main docks in Barra de Cazones

The town of Cazones de Herrera is the local government for 70 other communities which cover an area of 273.1 km2. It borders the municipalities of Tuxpan, Papantla, Poza Rica and Tihuatlán with the Gulf of Mexico to the east. Aside from the municipal seat, other significant communities are La Unión (1,824 hab.), Rancho Nuevo (1,238 hab.), Barra de Cazones (1,166 hab.) and Manlio Fabio Altamirano (1,121 hab.). The municipal government consists of a municipal president, an officer called a "síndico", and four representatives, called "regidors."

The municipality has an average altitude of ten meters above sea level. Its main river is the Cazones, which splits the municipality into two parts and is the traditional dividing line between Totonacapan and La Huasteca. The mouth of the river is here, forming the Barra (shoal) de Cazones. The municipality's shoreline faces the Gulf of Mexico and includes a number of beaches, including Playa Chaparrales, where marine turtles come to lay their eggs in March and April. The climate is hot and humid with an average annual temperature of 25C and an average rainfall of 2,000mm. The main ecosystem is high growth perennial rainforest. Remaining forests still have tropical hardwoods. The shoreline has a number of estuaries with mangroves. Wildlife includes rabbits, raccoons, opossums, armadillos, and coyotes. The shoreline has various estuaries with mangroves. The mangroves on the river are home to various species of crab, some of which are in danger of extinction.

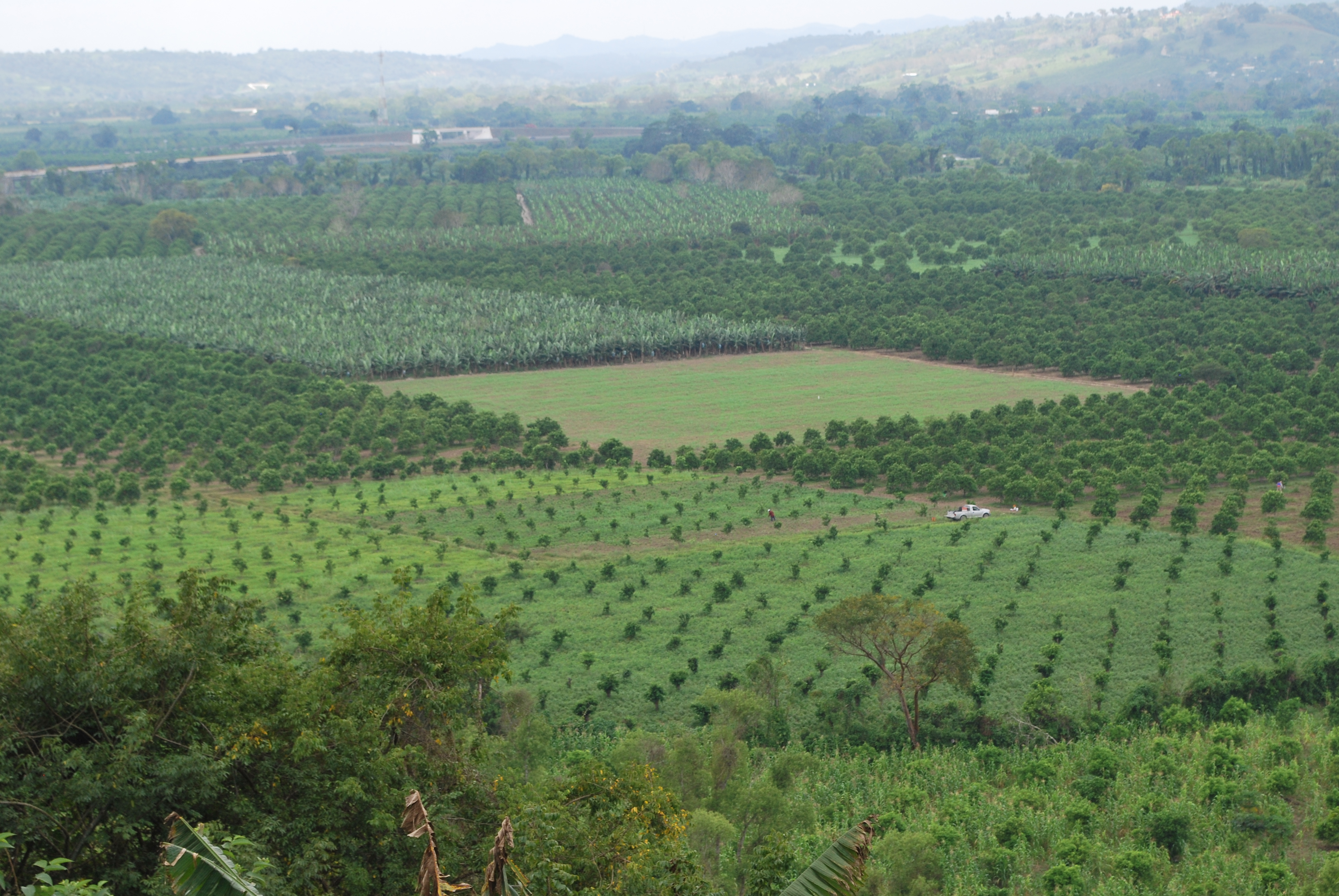
Fields in the municipality

The area today is considered to be in the far southeast of the La Huasteca cultural region, with traditional dances belonging to this region, with danzón as the most traditional music. The municipality organizes regular events to promote and preserve the traditional dances of the Veracruz Huasteca. The establishment of the municipality is celebrated from June 16–23 each year. Carnival is another important annual festival. The local cuisine is rich in local seafood such as shrimp, sea bass, crab, and octopus, often served with mole, adobo, and chili pepper. One notable non-seafood dish is pork served in a chili pepper and garlic sauce. Just over 15% of the population speaks an indigenous language with the rest speaking Spanish.

The municipality is considered to have a high level of socioeconomic marginalization. About 34% have problems obtaining sufficient food; 45% have problems obtaining sufficient education or job training and about 70% lack their own land. Of the municipality's 71 communities, fifty are considered to be highly or very highly marginalized. As of the 2010 census, there were 5,991 residences. About 58% have running water, and less than 47% have drainage. Over 96% have electricity and access to a landfill. Seventy percent of homes have cement floors with 24% having dirt floors. About 15% have autos, 86% have televisions, 70% have refrigerators, 69% have radios, 34% have cell phones, just over five percent have computers, and less than two percent have Internet. About 54% of the working population of the municipality is involved in agriculture, fishing, and forestry. Principle crops include corn, oranges, bananas, green chili peppers, and grapefruit. Most livestock is cattle, followed by pigs, sheep, goats, and domestic fowl. About 12 percent is involved in mining, construction, and utilities. About 32% is involved in commerce and services, including tourism.

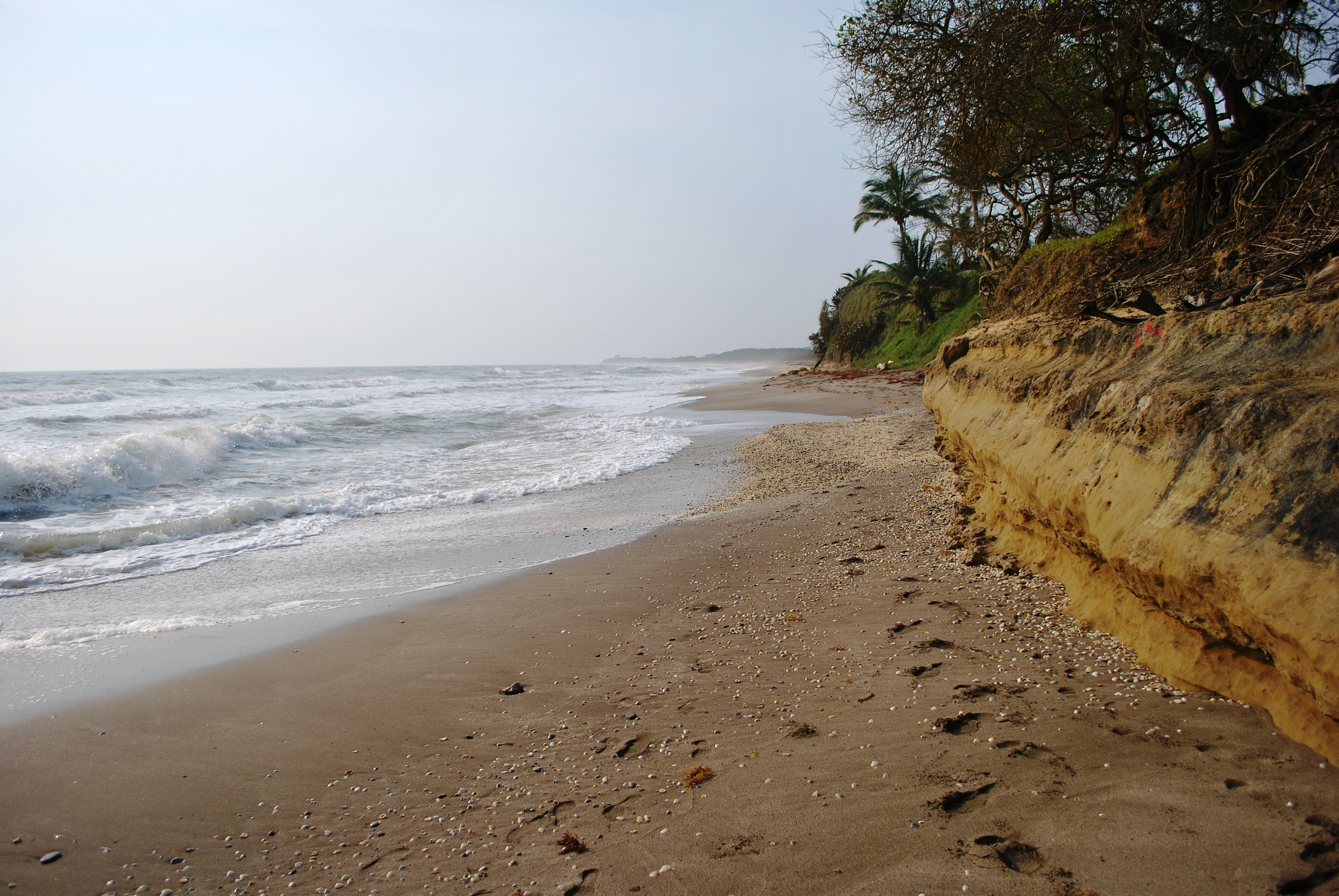
View of Playa Chaparrales

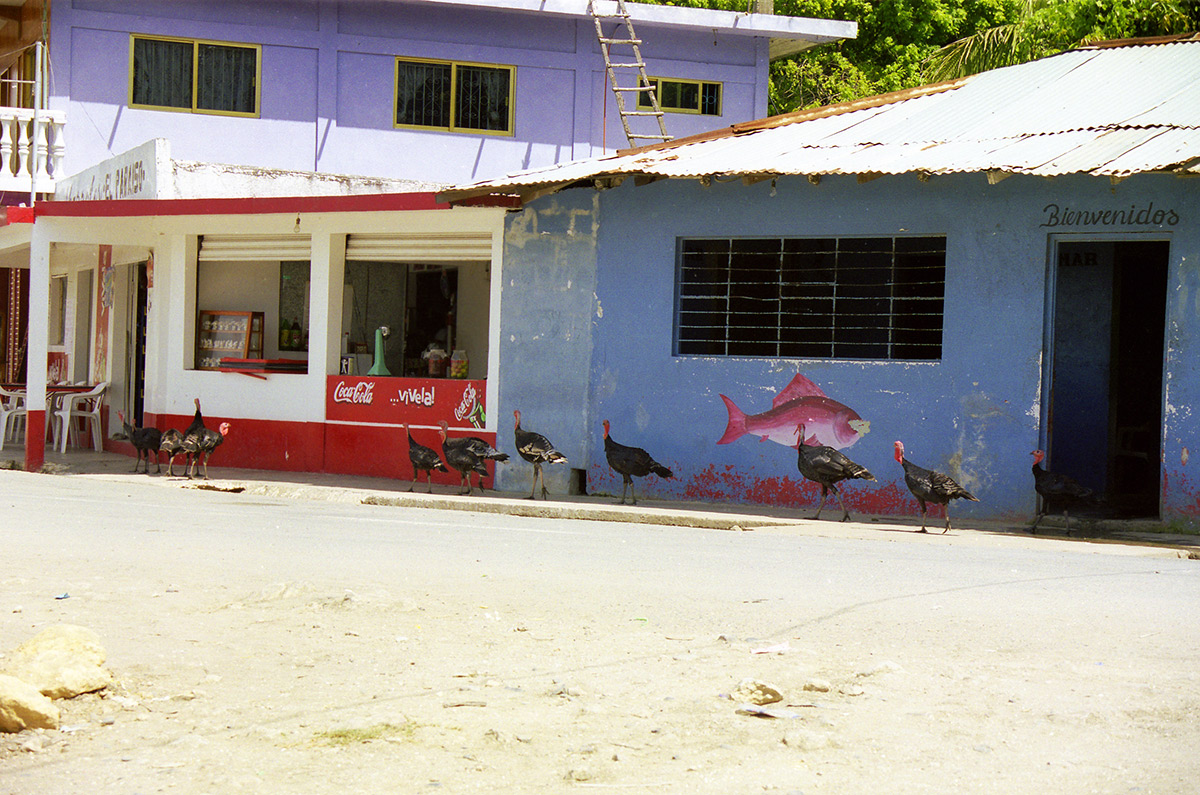
Wild turkeys in Cazones

Tourist attractions in the municipality are related to its shoreline and includes beaches such as Playa Azul, Playa Boquitas, Playa Sur, and Playa Chaparrales, as well as the Cazones River. The best known area is Barra de Cazones, where almost all of the municipality's hotels are. The community centers on the main boardwalk and docks which were built by the state in 2006. The Cazones lighthouse was built in the 1970s to guide small vessels such as fishing boats. Farallón is a small island located at the mouth of the Cazones River about half a kilometer from the ocean. In the colonial period, it was a refuge for pirates. One side of the island has a cliff called "El Chivo" eighteen meters high, which is popular for rappelling. The island is home to a species of black iguana called "garrobo negro." Playa Sur is the best known beach because of its hotels and other tourist infrastructure.

Playa Norte is a virgin beach with no permanent structures located on the opposite side of the mouth of the Cazones River from the main docks. The area is a haven for flocks of sea gulls and parts are filled with sea shells and pieces of coral. One of the features of this beach is "El Pulpo" (The Octopus), a rock formation with six branches formed by erosion from sea waves. Another is the Cueva del Tigre (Tiger Cave) a small cave which is hidden during high tide.

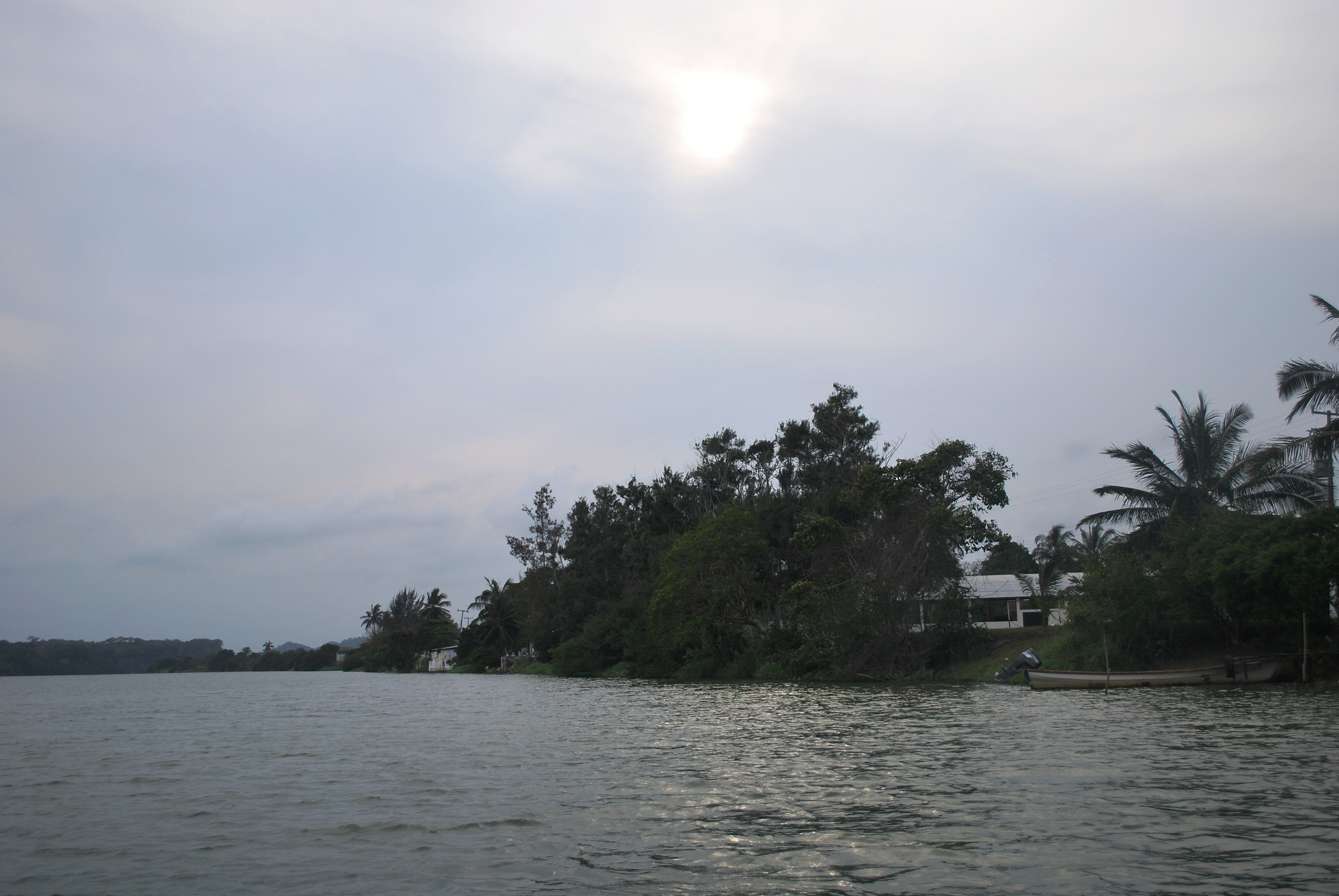
View of the Cazones River

Playa Chaparrales is a semi-virgin beach with permanent structures generally out of view of the shoreline. This beach has heaps of shells pushed onshore in capricious formations. It is a protected nesting site for three of Mexico's protected marine species. Visitors are welcome to the beach during nesting periods which are guarded by government officials.

Playa Azul is a semi virgin beach which contains an estuary called El Tejón.

Playa Boquillas is named after the Boquillas River estuary.

Arrecife Blake (Blake Reef) is also called the "Bajo Negro" (Black Low) because it is home to species of black coral. It also has expanses of mangroves. La Encantada is a cave which is home to a small species of bat.

There are 71.1 km of highway in the municipality, almost all of which is maintained by the state.

The municipality has thirty two preschools, one special education facility, forty two primary schools, sixteen middle schools, and nine high schools. There are no facilities of higher education. There are seventeen public libraries. There is a rate of just over fifteen percent illiteracy as of 2010. Just over 19% have not finished primary school.

The National Triathlon of Cazones is a major annual sporting event in the north of Veracruz, sponsored by the municipality and the federal government. Money raised from the event is used to help preserve marine turtle habitats.
