= Gutiérrez Zamora =

- Municipality
- Location within Mexico
- Coordinates: 20°27′N 97°05′W
- Country: Mexico
- State: Veracruz
- Foundation: July 21, 1877

Government
  - Municipal President: Wilman Monje Morales (2018-2021)

Area
  - Total: 233.6 km^{2} (90.2 sq mi)

Population
  - Total: 24 322
  - Density: 104.12/km^{2} (269.7/sq mi)
- Time zone: UTC-6 (CST)
- Website: Official Website

Gutiérrez Zamora is a city in the Mexican state of Veracruz. Gutiérrez Zamora is bordered by Papantla, Tuxpan, Poza Rica and Coatzintla, and it is served by both the railway and Federal Highways 180 and 190.

It was named in honour of Manuel Gutiérrez Zamora, a native of the port of Veracruz who served as governor of the state in the mid-19th century.
