= Chumatlán =

Chumatlan
- Municipality
- Location of Chumatlan within Mexico
- Coordinates: 20°12′N 97°36′W
- Country: Mexico
- State: Veracruz

Government
  - Municipal President: Rutilio Espinosa Pérez

Area
  - Total: 36.19 km^{2} (13.97 sq mi)
- Elevation: 420 m (1,380 ft)
- Highest elevation: 500 m (1,600 ft)
- Lowest elevation: 100 m (330 ft)

Population (2010)
  - Total: 3,889
  - Density: 169.1/km^{2} (438/sq mi)
- Time zone: UTC-6 (CST)
- Postal Codes: 93040, 93041, 93050
- Area code: 784
- Website: Official Website

Chumatlan is a municipality in the Mexican state of Veracruz.

== Geography ==
It is located in the middle of the state, about 105 km from state capital Xalapa. It has a surface of 36.19 km2. It is located at 20°12′N 97°36′W. The weather in Chumatlan is warm all year with rains in summer.

The municipality is delimited to the north by Coyutla, to the north-east by Espinal, to the south-west by Mecatlán and to the east by Coxquihui. The weather in Chumatlan is warm all year with rains in summer.

== Products ==
It produces principally maize, beans and coffee.

== Culture ==
A celebration in honor to Virgen de la Natividad, patron of the town, takes place in September.
