= Espinal, Veracruz =

Espinal
- Municipality
- Location in Mexico
- Coordinates: 20°16′00″N 97°24′00″W
- Country: Mexico
- State: Veracruz

Area
  - Total: 100 km^{2} (39 sq mi)

Population
  - Total: 24,823

Espinal is a municipality that is located in the central area of the state of Veracruz in the Totonaca Region. It is located at coordinates 20° 16' north latitude and 97° 24' west longitude, and has a height of 100 m.

The municipality is made up 82 localities where 24,823 people live.
