= Nuestra Belleza Veracruz 2010 =

- Date: July 28, 2010
- Venue: Hotel Holliday Inn Poza Rica, Tihuatlán, Veracruz
- Broadcaster: Televisa
- Entrants: 7
- Placements: 3
- Winner: Diana Botello

Nuestra Belleza Veracruz 2010, was held at the Hotel Holliday Inn Poza Rica, Tihuatlán, Veracruz on July 28, 2010. At the conclusion of the final night of competition, Diana Botello of Boca del Río was crowned the winner. Botello was crowned by outgoing Nuestra Belleza Veracruz titleholder, Fabiola Pinal. Seven contestants competed for the state title.

== Results ==
=== Placements ===
Final results	Contestant
Nuestra Belleza Veracruz 2010	Diana Botello
1st Runner-up	Nelly Cebrián
2nd Runner-up	Ana Paula Crippa

== Contestants ==
Hometown	Contestant	Age
Boca del Río	Ana Paula Crippa Méndez	19
Boca del Río	Diana Stefanía Botello Meza	22
Orizaba	Lorena Slame Romero	22
Poza Rica	Ilse Solís Hernández	18
Tihuatlán	Xiomara del Ángel Mendoza	18
Veracruz	Alma Cristina Suárez Briano	21
Veracruz	Aridaí Galindo Casanova	22
Veracruz	Nayeli Cebrián García	22
