= Pablo Anaya Rivera =

Mexican politician

- Born: 26 June 1948 (age 77); Poza Rica, Veracruz, Mexico
- Occupation: Politician
- Political party: PRI

Pablo Anaya Rivera (born 26 June 1948) is a Mexican politician affiliated with the Institutional Revolutionary Party (PRI). In the 2003 mid-terms he was elected to the Chamber of Deputies to represent the fifth district of Veracruz during the 59th Congress.
