= El Tajín National Airport =

Airport serving Poza Rica, Veracruz, Mexico

Poza Rica Airport Aeropuerto de Poza Rica
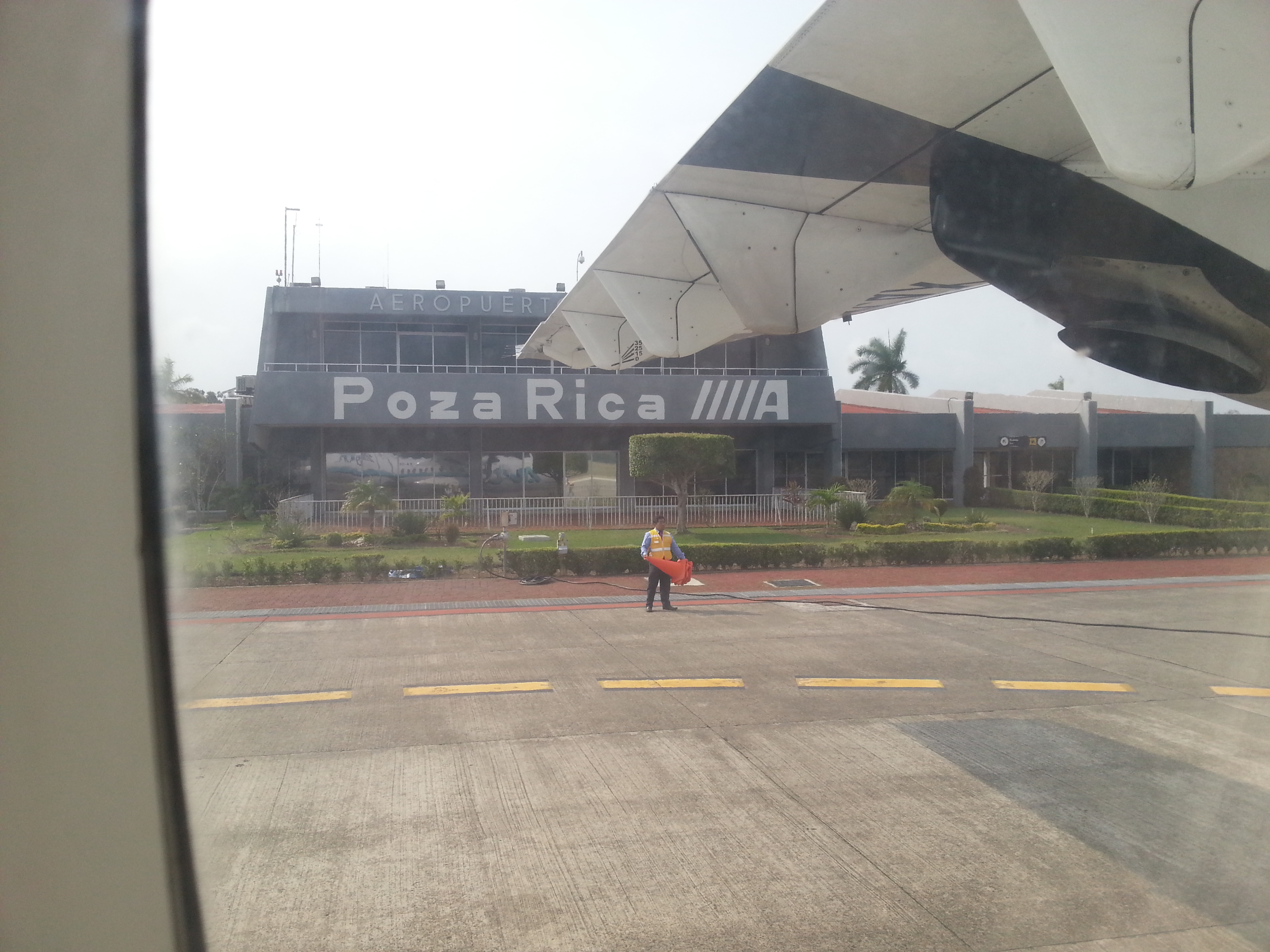
- IATA: PAZ; ICAO: MMPA

Summary
- Airport type: Public
- Operator: Aeropuertos y Servicios Auxiliares
- Serves: Poza Rica, Veracruz, Mexico
- Location: Tihuatlán, Veracruz, Mexico
- Time zone: CST (UTC−06:00)
- Elevation AMSL: 151 m / 495 ft
- Coordinates: 20°36′09″N 97°27′39″W
- Website: www.aeropuertosasa.mx/PAZ

Map
- Location of airport in Veracruz PAZ (Mexico)

Runways
Direction	Length		Surface
Direction	m	ft	Surface
08/26	1,800	5,906	Asphalt

Statistics (2025)
- Total passengers: 1,997
- Source: Agencia Federal de Aviación Civil

Poza Rica Airport (Spanish: Aeropuerto de Poza Rica); officially Aeropuerto Nacional El Tajín (El Tajín National Airport) (IATA: PAZ, ICAO: MMPA) is an airport located in Tihuatlán, Veracruz, Mexico. It serves domestic flights for Poza Rica and Tuxpan in Veracruz, while also supporting various executive and general aviation activities. Operated by Aeropuertos y Servicios Auxiliares, a federal government-owned corporation, the airport takes its name from El Tajín, a pre-Columbian archaeological site in Northern Veracruz. In 2025, the airport handled 1,997 passengers.

Throughout the 1990s and 2000s, Poza Rica Airport saw significant operations, largely driven by the substantial volume of passengers associated with the petroleum industry. While Aeromexico and Aeromar previously served the airport, most commercial flights were suspended by 2020. Since 2023, it has experienced intermittent service by the regional airline Aerus, with flights to Reynosa, Tampico, Veracruz, and Villahermosa.

== Facilities ==
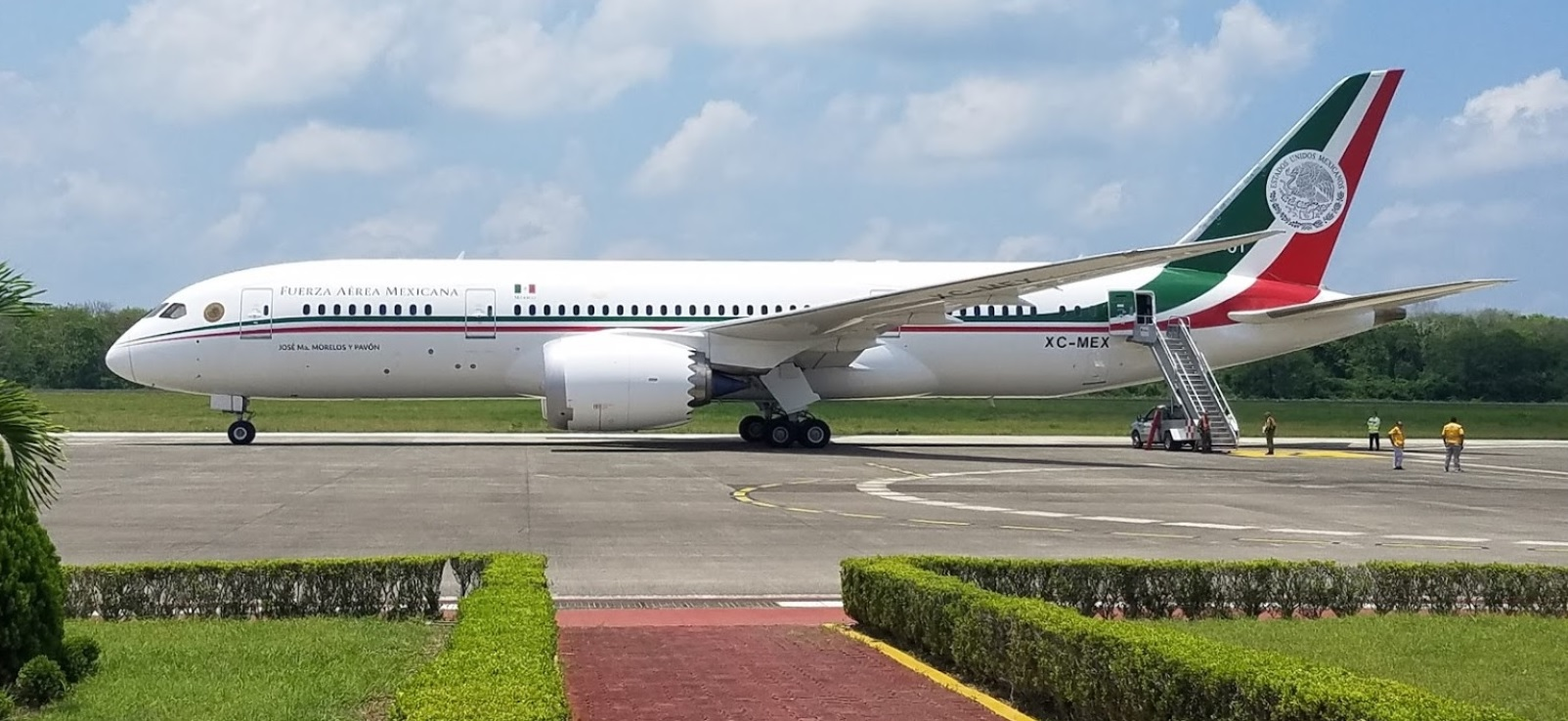
Mexican presidential jet Boeing 787-8 XC-MEX at PAZ

The airport is situated at an elevation of 151 metres (495 ft) above mean sea level, covering an area of 157 hectares (390 acres). It features a single asphalt runway, designated as 28/26, measuring 1,800 metres (5,900 ft). The commercial aviation apron spans 15,750 square metres (169,500 sq ft), featuring two parking positions for narrow-body aircraft and additional stands for general aviation. Official operating hours are from 7:00 to 19:00.

The passenger terminal caters to both domestic arrivals and departures in a single-story structure. It includes check-in areas, a security checkpoint, a baggage claim area, and an arrivals hall with car rental services, taxi stands, and several retail stores. The departures concourse includes three gates with direct access to the apron, allowing passengers to board their planes by walking to the aircraft. Adjacent facilities include parking areas, civil aviation hangars, administration offices, courier and logistic facilities, and facilities for general aviation.

== Statistics ==
=== Annual Traffic ===
Passenger statistics at PAZ
Year	Total Passengers	change %	Cargo movements (t)	Air operations
2006	75,876	Steady	81	10,487
2007	80,861	▲6.56%	93	11,635
2008	106,636	▲31.87%	58	11,432
2009	119,183	▲11.76%	82	11,303
2010	102,192	▼14.25%	202	11,046
2011	113,720	▲11.28%	123	12,009
2012	127,745	▲12.33%	198	14,018
2013	113,496	▼11.15%	173	9,999
2014	92,587	▼18.42%	120	9,444
2015	60,575	▼34.57%	93	7,333
2016	37,613	▼37.90%	88	4,013
2017	27,365	▼27.24%	45	3,289
2018	25,890	▼5.39%	11	4,172
2019	27,083	▲4.61%	17	5,391
2020	4,146	▼84.69%	0.4	1,204
2021	2,645	▼36.21%	0	2,342
2022	2,666	▲0.80%	0	1,147
2023	3,050	▲14.40%	0	1,015
2024	1,180	▼61.31%	0	712
2025	1,997	▲69.23%	0	1,138

== See also ==
- List of airports in Mexico
- List of the busiest airports in Mexico
- List of busiest airports in North America
- List of the busiest airports in Latin America
- List of airports by ICAO code: M
- Airline destinations
- Transportation in Mexico
- Tourism in Mexico
- Petroleum industry in Mexico
