= 5th federal electoral district of Veracruz =

Federal electoral district of Mexico

Veracruz's 5th
- Electoral district of the Chamber of Deputies of Mexico

- 5th district since 2023

Incumbent
- Member: Francisco Javier Velázquez
- Party: ▌Morena
- Congress: 66th (2024–2027)

District
- State: Veracruz
- Head town: Poza Rica de Hidalgo
- Coordinates: 20°32′N 97°27′W
- Covers: Poza Rica, Tamiahua, Tihuatlán, Tuxpan
- PR region: Third
- Precincts: 256
- Population: 455,040 (2020 census)

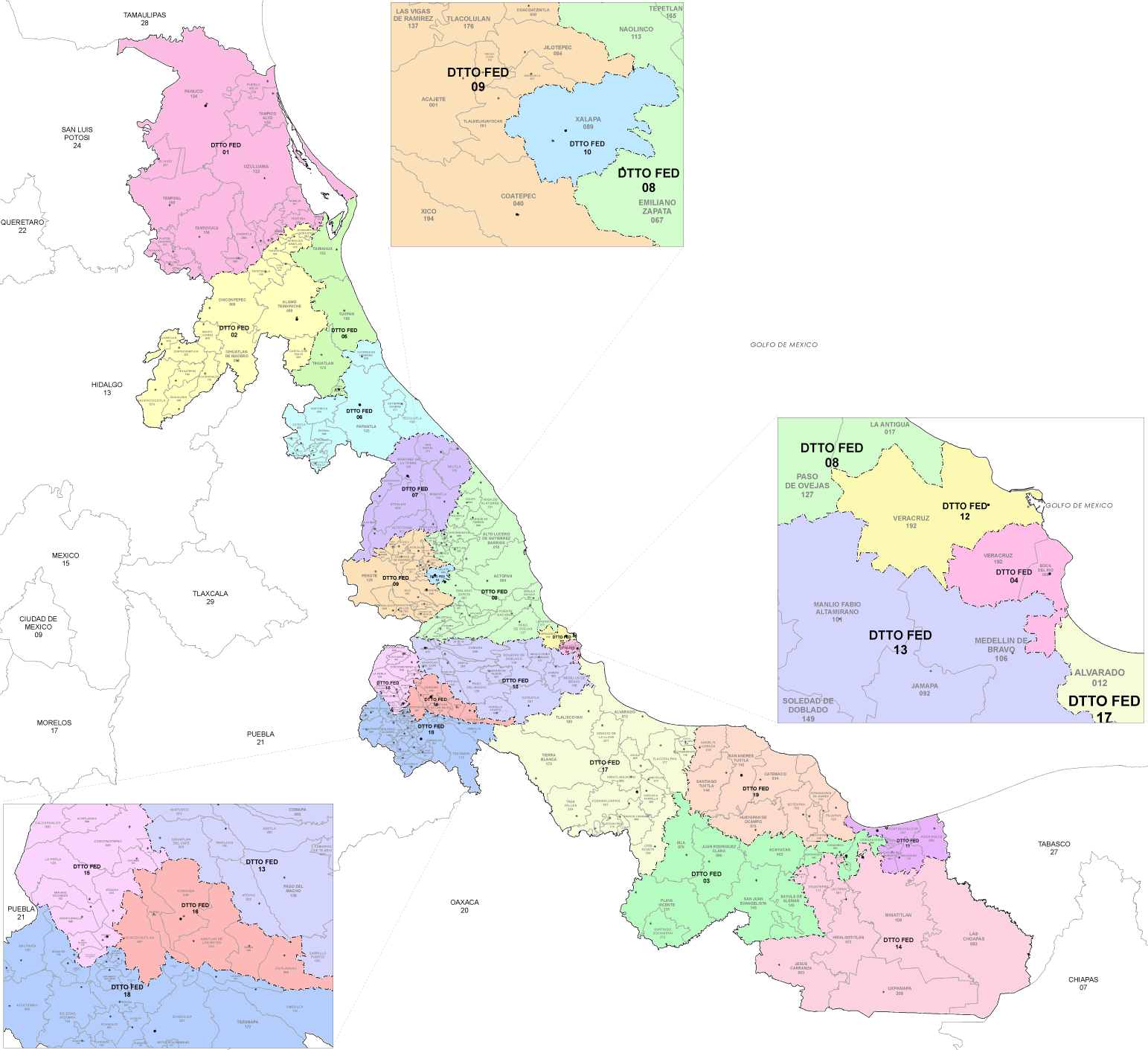
Federal electoral districts of Veracruz since 2023

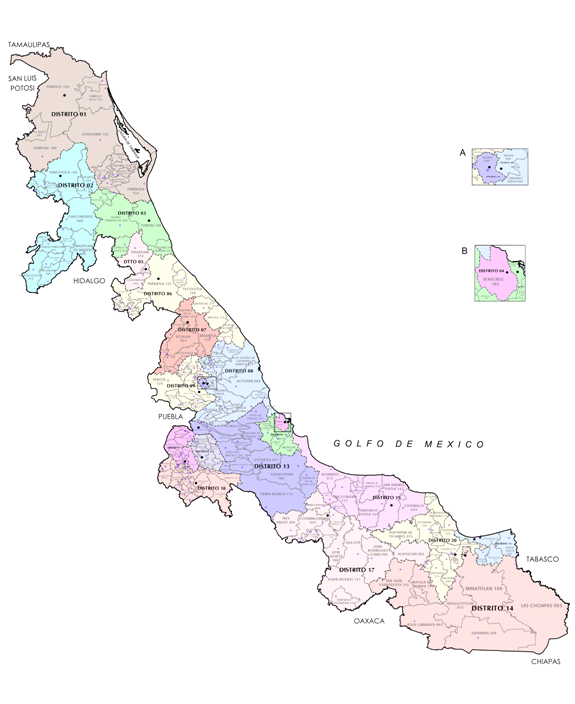
Veracruz under the 2017–2022 districting plan

The 5th federal electoral district of Veracruz (Spanish: Distrito electoral federal 05 de Veracruz) is one of the 300 electoral districts into which Mexico is divided for elections to the federal Chamber of Deputies and one of 19 such districts in the state of Veracruz.

It elects one deputy to the lower house of Congress for each three-year legislative session by means of the first-past-the-post system. Votes cast in the district also count towards the calculation of proportional representation ("plurinominal") deputies elected from the third region.

The current member for the district, elected in the 2024 general election, is Francisco Javier Velázquez Vallejo of the National Regeneration Movement (Morena).

== District territory ==
Veracruz lost a congressional district in the 2023 districting plan adopted by the National Electoral Institute (INE), which is to be used for the 2024, 2027 and 2030 elections. The reconfigured 5th district covers 256 electoral precincts (secciones electorales) across the municipalities of Poza Rica, Tamiahua, Tihuatlán and Tuxpan in the north of the state.

The head town (cabecera distrital), where results from individual polling stations are gathered together and tallied, is the city of Poza Rica de Hidalgo. The district reported a population of 455,040 in the 2020 census.

== Previous districting schemes ==
Evolution of electoral district numbers
	1974	1978	1996	2005	2017	2023
Veracruz	15	23	23	21	20	19
Chamber of Deputies	196	300				

Because of shifting demographics, Veracruz currently has four fewer districts than the 23 the state was allocated under the 1977 electoral reforms.

2017–2022

Between 2017 and 2022, Veracruz was assigned 20 electoral districts. The 5th district had its head town at Poza Rica but it comprised only three municipalities:
- Poza Rica, Coatzintla and Tihuatlán.

2005–2017

Veracruz's allocation of congressional seats fell to 21 in the 2005 redistricting process. Between 2005 and 2017 the district had its head town at Poza Rica and it covered four municipalities:
- Castillo de Teayo, Coatzintla, Poza Rica and Tihuatlán.

1996–2005

Under the 1996 districting plan, which allocated Veracruz 23 districts, the head town was at Poza Rica and the district covered the municipalities of Coatzintla, Poza Rica and Tihuatlán.

1978–1996

The districting scheme in force from 1978 to 1996 was the result of the 1977 electoral reforms, which increased the number of single-member seats in the Chamber of Deputies from 196 to 300. Under that plan, Veracruz's seat allocation rose from 15 to 23. The 5th district had its head town at Misantla and it covered the municipalities of Acajete, Atzalán, Coacoatzintla, Colipa, Chiconquiaco, Jilotepec, Juchique, Landero y Coss, Miahuatlán, Las Minas, Misantla, Nautla, Perote, Tatatila, Tenochtitlán, Tlacolulan, Tonavan, Vega de Alatorre, Vigas de Ramírez, Villa Aldama and Yecuatla.

== Deputies returned to Congress ==
(Mexico) National parties
- Current
- PAN
- PRI
- PT
- PVEM
- MC
- Morena
- PAZ
- Somos
- Defunct or local only
- PLM
- PNR
- PRM
- PNM
- PP
- PPS
- PARM
- PFCRN
- CON
- PANAL
- PSD
- PES
- PES
- PRD

Veracruz's 5th district
Election	Deputy	Party	Term	Legislature
1916	Rodolfo Curti; Jenaro Ramírez		1916–1917	Constituent Congress of Querétaro
...
1973	Rafael Hernández Ochoa (Note: Hernández Ochoa resigned his seat to compete successfully for the governorship of Veracruz.); Guillermo Muñoz Mosqueda	Institutional Revolutionary Party	1973–1974; 1974–1976	49th Congress
1976	Seth Cardeña Luna	Institutional Revolutionary Party	1976–1979	50th Congress
1979	Lucía Méndez Hernández	Institutional Revolutionary Party	1979–1982	51st Congress
1982	Alfonso Arroyo Flores	Institutional Revolutionary Party	1982–1985	52nd Congress
1985	Juan Nicolás Callejas Arroyo	Institutional Revolutionary Party	1985–1988	53rd Congress
1988	Gustavo Moreno Ramos	Institutional Revolutionary Party	1988–1991	54th Congress
1991	Celestino Manuel Ortiz Denetro	Institutional Revolutionary Party	1991–1994	55th Congress
1994	Guillermo Zúñiga Martínez	Institutional Revolutionary Party	1994–1997	56th Congress
1997	Enrique Bazáñez Trevethan	Institutional Revolutionary Party	1997–2000	57th Congress
2000	Marcos Paulino López Mora	Institutional Revolutionary Party	2000–2003	58th Congress
2003	Pablo Anaya Rivera	Institutional Revolutionary Party	2003–2006	59th Congress
2006	Antonio del Valle Toca	National Action Party (Mexico)	2006–2009	60th Congress
2009	Sergio Lorenzo Quiroz Cruz	Institutional Revolutionary Party	2009–2012	61st Congress
2012	Gaudencio Hernández Burgos	Institutional Revolutionary Party	2012–2015	62nd Congress
2015	Leonardo Amador Rodríguez	Party of the Democratic Revolution	2015–2018	63rd Congress
2018	Raquel Bonilla Herrera	National Regeneration Movement	2018–2021	64th Congress
2021	Raquel Bonilla Herrera	National Regeneration Movement	2021–2024	65th Congress
2024	Francisco Javier Velázquez Vallejo	National Regeneration Movement	2024–2027	66th Congress

== Presidential elections ==
Veracruz's 5th district
Election	District won by	Party or coalition	%
2018	Andrés Manuel López Obrador	Juntos Haremos Historia	61.8549
2024	Claudia Sheinbaum Pardo	Sigamos Haciendo Historia	69.7696
