= Aeroméxico Flight 250 =

2000 aviation accident in Mexico

- An Aeroméxico DC-9, similar to the one involved

Accident
- Date: 6 October 2000
- Summary: Runway excursion on landing due to adverse weather conditions and pilot error
- Site: General Lucio Blanco International Airport, Tamaulipas, Mexico; 26°00′41″N 98°13′48″W

Aircraft
- Aircraft type: McDonnell Douglas DC-9-31
- Operator: Aeroméxico
- IATA flight No.: AM250
- ICAO flight No.: AMX250
- Call sign: AEROMEXICO 250
- Registration: N936ML
- Flight origin: Mexico City International Airport, Mexico City, Mexico
- Destination: General Lucio Blanco International Airport, Tamaulipas, Mexico
- Occupants: 88
- Passengers: 83
- Crew: 5
- Fatalities: 0
- Injuries: 64
- Survivors: 88

Ground casualties
- Ground fatalities: 4

On 6 October, 2000, Aeroméxico Flight 250, a McDonnell Douglas DC-9-31 operating a domestic flight in Mexico from Mexico City International Airport to General Lucio Blanco International Airport, Tamaulipas, overran the runway on landing and crashed into houses. All 88 people on board survived, with 64 being injured, of which seven required hospitalization, while four people on the ground were killed. The cause of the accident was found out to be the conditions conditions of adverse weather, present in the area at the time and caused by the remains of Hurricane Keith. Pilot error was also a factor.

== Background ==
=== Aircraft ===
The aircraft involved in the accident was a McDonnell Douglas DC-9-31 registered as N936ML and manufactured in 1970. The aircraft was owned by Wells Fargo Bank Northwest NA Trustee and leased to Aeroméxico, hence its US registration.

=== Crew and passengers ===
There were two pilot on board the aircraft, the 50 years old captain Alejandro Corzo, who had more than 10000 flight hours, and first officer Alejandro Fernandez. The three other crew members were flight attendants. The 83 passengers on board were all mexican nationals.

=== Hurricane Keith ===
At the time the area of Reynosa was being affected by the remains of Hurricane Keith, which had weakened to a tropical storm, and then to a tropical depression. The storm brought adverse weather conditions to the area, including nearly 60 km/h winds and torrential rains.

== Accident ==
The aircraft took off from Mexico City International Airport on a flight to Reynosa with 88 people on board; the flight was uneventful until landing. At 4:55 pm local time the plane was about to land at General Lucio Blanco International Airport, where storm conditions and heavy rain were present at the time. The airplane landed late, nearly at the half of the 1900 meters runway, and couldn't stop before its end. After overrunning the runway the plane hit trees and crashed into houses of the Francisco Sarabia neighbourhood, in Reynosa, it then slid for a few more meters until it came to a halt in a ditch near the Rhode Canal. The aircraft broke in three, but did not catch fire. All of the 88 people on board survived, most of them evacuated through the wings, but 64 of them were injured, of which seven, including both pilots and a flight attendant, were treated in hospitals. One of the injuries was serious. On the ground a local resident and her three children were killed when the plane crashed into their house, they were the only fatalities of the accident.

== Aftermath ==
In the hours following the crash Reynosa General Lucio Blanco International Airport was shut down, also to allow the operations of fuel removal from the aircraft, made to avoid the start of a fire. The airline also prepared another aircraft to ferry back to Mexico City the passengers and crew who needed to. Aeroméxico offered to pay the expenses for the funerals of the four people that died on the ground, and compensations to those whose house was damaged or destroyed in the event.

== Investigation ==
The Subsecretaría de Transporte started an investigation on the accident, representatives from the United States were sent to support it. The aircraft's flight data recorders were recovered the day following the crash. The final investigation report on Flight 250 was released in 2001 and cited pilot error and weather as the main causes. The pilots landed late on the runway General Lucio Blanco International Airport, which was also one of the shortest commercial runways in the country, due to errors in the approach procedure, that became inaccurate. The runway was inundated, due to the heavy rains brought by hurricane Keith, and this annulled the effects of the braking system, and causing the plane to not stop before the end of the little part of runway it had left.

== See also ==
- Aeroméxico Flight 230, another Aeroméxico DC-9 that had a runway excursion
- Philippine Airlines Flight 124, a BAC One-Eleven that crashed in similar circumstances
