= Antonio del Valle Toca =

Mexican politician

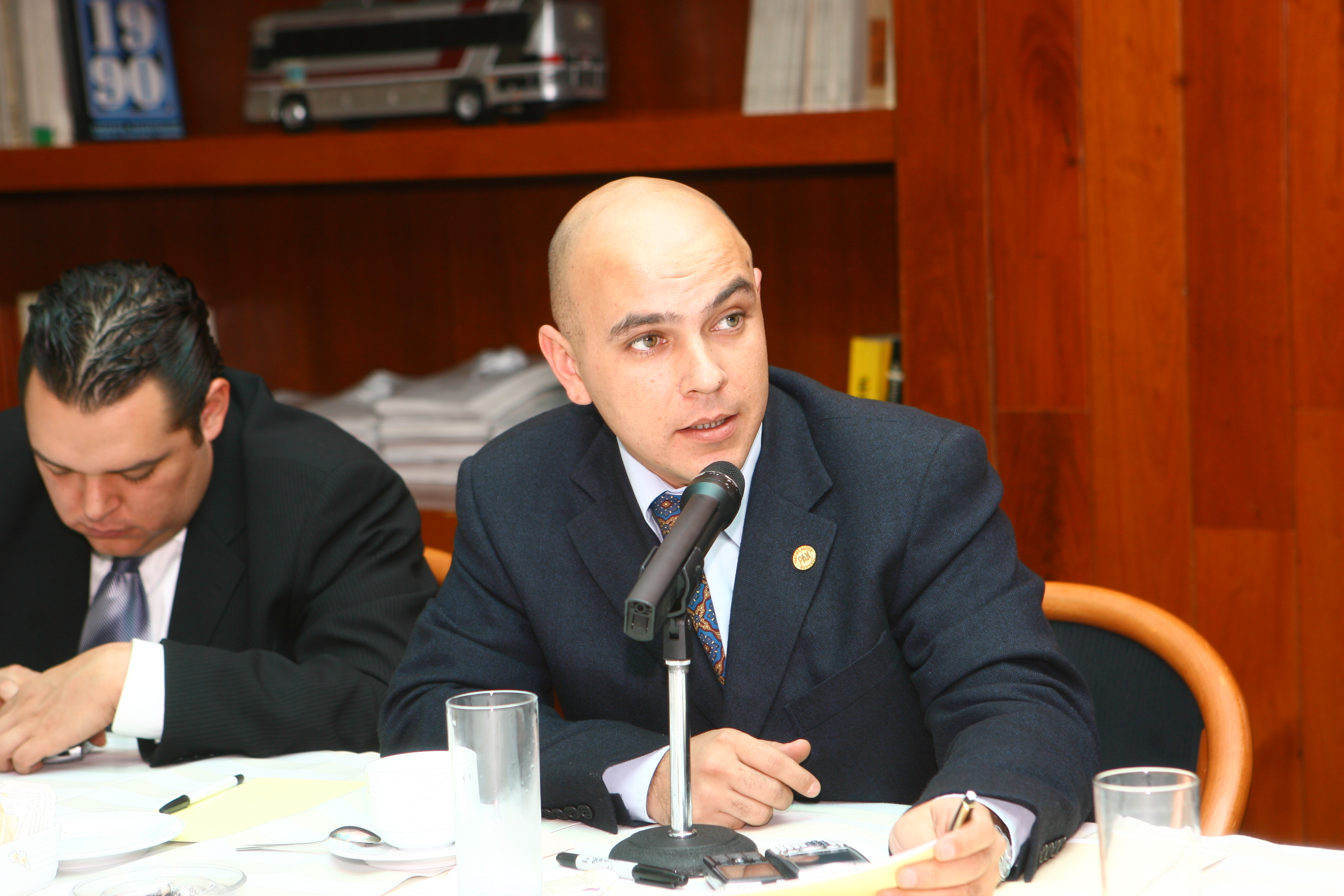
- Born: 8 October 1971 (age 54); Poza Rica de Hidalgo, Veracruz, Mexico
- Occupation: Politician
- Political party: PAN (1998–2013); PRD (2013–present)

Antonio del Valle Toca (born 8 October 1971) is a Mexican politician from the Party of the Democratic Revolution (PRD) (formerly from the National Action Party, PAN). In the 2006 general election he was elected on the PAN ticket to the Chamber of Deputies to represent the fifth district of Veracruz during the 60th session of Congress.
