= Sergio Lorenzo Quiroz =

Mexican politician

- Born: 12 July 1959 (age 66); Poza Rica, Veracruz, Mexico
- Occupation: Politician
- Political party: PRI

Sergio Lorenzo Quiroz Cruz (born 12 July 1959) is a Mexican politician from the Institutional Revolutionary Party (PRI). In the 2009 mid-terms he was elected to the Chamber of Deputies to represent the fifth district of Veracruz during the 61st session of Congress.
