= Marcos López Mora =

Mexican politician (born 1933)

- Born: 22 June 1933 (age 92); Veracruz, Veracruz, Mexico
- Occupation: Politician
- Political party: PRI

Marcos Paulino López Mora (born 22 June 1933) is a Mexican politician from the Institutional Revolutionary Party (PRI). In the 2000 general election he was elected to the Chamber of Deputies to represent the fifth district of Veracruz during the 58th session of Congress. He previously served as the municipal president of Poza Rica from 1979 to 1982 and as a local deputy in the Congress of Veracruz from 1994 to 1997.
