= Flight 124 =

Flight 124 may refer to the following incidents involving commercial airliners:

Listed chronologically

- Philippine Airlines Flight 124, overran a runway resulting in ground fatalities on 21 July 1989
- Malaysia Airlines Flight 124, experienced uncommanded maneuvers on 1 August 2005

== See also ==
- STS-124, a successful Space Shuttle mission in May–June 2008
