= Gaudencio =

Gaudencio may refer to the following people:

Given name

- Gaudencio Hernández Burgos (born 1962), Mexican politician
- Gaudencio Rosales (born 1932), Roman Catholic Cardinal and Archbishop of Manila, the Philippines
- José Gaudencio León Castañeda (born 1960), Mexican politician

Surname

- Miguel Gaudêncio (born 1971), African-Portuguese film director
