= Aerodavinci =

Mexican airline

Aero Davinci
IATA	ICAO	Call sign
-	DVI	AERO DAVINCI
- Founded: 1997
- Hubs: General Lucio Blanco International Airport
- Fleet size: 1
- Destinations: 4
- Parent company: Aero Davinci International SA de CV
- Headquarters: Reynosa, Tamaulipas, Mexico
- Website: aerodavinci.com.mx

Aero DaVinci Internacional, S.A. de C.V. is an airline based in Reynosa, Tamaulipas, Mexico. It has been in operation since 1997 and operates air taxi, cargo and charter services.

== Fleet ==
As of August 2025, Aerodavinci operates the following aircraft:

- 1 Jetstream 31
- Fairchild Swearingen Metroliner
