= Tuxpan Municipality, Veracruz =

Tuxpan
- Municipality
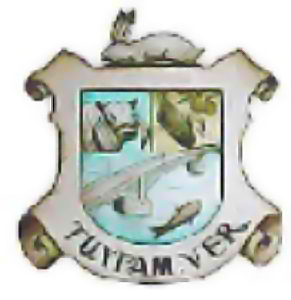
- Coat of arms

- Location of Tuxpan within Mexico
- Coordinates: 20°57′N 97°24′W
- Country: Mexico
- State: Veracruz

Government
  - Municipal President: Juan Antonio Aguilar Mancha

Area
  - Total: 1,061.9 km^{2} (410.0 sq mi)
- Elevation: 10 m (33 ft)

Population
  - Total: 143 362
  - Density: 135.01/km^{2} (349.7/sq mi)
- Time zone: UTC-6 (CST)
  - Summer (DST): UTC-7 (CDT)
- Website: http://tuxpanveracruz.gob.mx/

Tuxpan (or Túxpam, fully Túxpam de Rodríguez Cano, Spanish: Municipio de Tuxpan) is a municipality located in the Mexican state of Veracruz.

The municipal seat is Túxpam de Rodríguez Cano.

== Demographics ==
The population of the municipality was 134,394 inhabitants, according to the INEGI census of 2005, residing in a total area of 1,051.89 km^{2} (406.14 sq mi).

== Geography ==
The municipality covers an area of 1,061.90 km^{2}.

=== Subdivisions ===
The municipality includes many smaller outlying communities, the largest of which are Alto Lucero and Santiago de la Peña. A local beachside community is also nearby.

- 43 congregaciones.
- 41 rancherías
- 1 poblado.

=== Borders ===
- N: Tamiahua Municipality
- S: Cazones Municipality
- E: Gulf of Mexico
- W: Álamo-Temapache Municipality and Tihuatlán Municipality
