= Juan Nicolás Callejas Arroyo =

Mexican politician

- Born: 9 July 1944; Nautla, Veracruz, Mexico
- Died: 21 September 2017 (aged 73)
- Occupation: Politician
- Political party: PRI

Juan Nicolás Callejas Arroyo (9 July 1944 – 21 September 2017) was a Mexican politician from the Institutional Revolutionary Party (PRI). He was born in Nautla, Veracruz.

He served in the Chamber of Deputies for three sessions of Congress: the 53rd (for Veracruz's 5th), the 58th (for Veracruz's 8th) and the 61st (as a plurinominal deputy). He also served in the 53rd and 60th sessions of the Congress of Veracruz.

He died of lung cancer in the city of Veracruz on 21 September 2017.
