= Enrique Cabrera =

Mexican artist

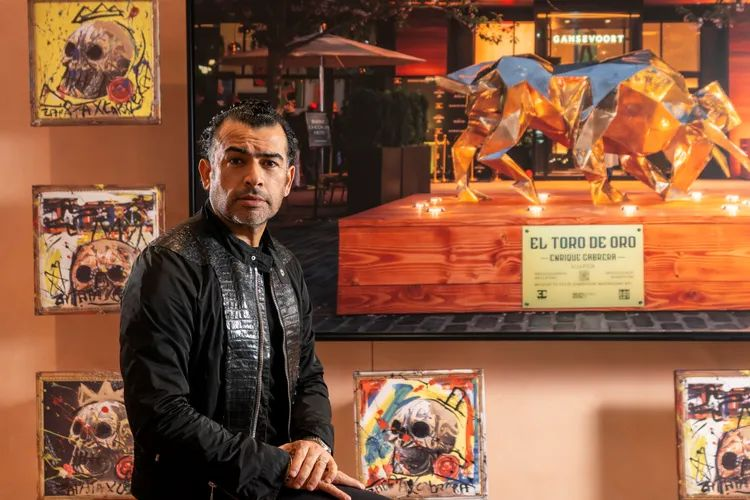
- Cabrera in 2025
- Born: July 14, 1974 (age 52); Poza Rica de Hidalgo, Veracruz, Mexico
- Occupations: Plastic artist Musician; Photographer
- Years active: 2008–present
- Notable work: Palmarius (2014); Naia (2021); El Toro de Oro (2022)

Enrique Cabrera (Poza Rica, July 14, 1974) is a Mexican sculptor, photographer, musician and restorer. He began his career doing restoration projects with the Government of Mexico, and created his first collection of sculptures, titled Trilogía, in 2010. Since then, his works have been exhibited in places like the Louvre Museum and the Musée Picasso.

== Career ==
=== Early life and beginnings ===
Cabrera was born in the town of Poza Rica de Hidalgo, Veracruz, in 1974. Raised in a family linked to the arts, in his adolescence he became interested in music and learned to play instruments such as guitar, bass, piano and drums. In the early 1990s he became involved in the sculpture world, using mainly metal as a material.

He became professionally involved as a restorer with the Mexican department store chain Sanborns, and in 2008 he created his first skull sculpture, a technique that would become one of his main characteristics during his career.

=== Work with the government of Mexico and Palmarius ===
After his experience with Sanborns, he became involved with the Mexican government as a restorer of historical sculpture pieces in the Bicentennial Route in 2010. Around the same time, he collaborated with international restoration projects with the National Center for Plastic Arts Research and the National Institute of Fine Arts and Literature. He also participated in the Pueblos Mágicos project, doing photography work to promote tourism in Mexico.

In 2010 he created Trilogía, his first collection of sculptures in gold, silver and copper, with motifs related to Mexican culture. After creating the sculpture collections Skull Miami Colors, Virgen de Guadalupe and San Miguel Arcángel, in 2014 he developed a project entitled Palmarius, made up of sculptures of skulls of various sizes. The largest of them, designed with bronze alloy weighing more than half a ton and two meters high, was exhibited in several countries.

In mid-2019 he announced that he was making seven skull sculptures, which would be placed in seven different cities: Mexico City, Miami, Barcelona, Dubai, Paris, Milan, and New York City. In October of the same year he represented his country at the Art Shopping Paris event, held at the Carrousel du Louvre.

In 2020 he collaborated with artist Domingo Zapata in a new collection entitled Palmarius Colors, which consisted of four paintings based on his Palmarius project.

=== Naia and El Toro de Oro ===
Inspired by Naia, the longest-lived female skeleton in the Americas found in Tulum, in the early 2020s he developed a new collection of sculptures, consisting of seven pieces, which were placed in different cities. In January 2021, he announced the donation of one of these sculptures to be located in his native Poza Rica de Hidalgo.

On May 5, 2022, the Gansevoort Meatpacking Hotel in New York unveiled El Toro de Oro, a large sculpture created by Cabrera from gold ingots. It is the eighth piece in the El Toro de Oro collection, and was part of the celebration of Mexican heritage with the support of the Mexican Consulate and the Meatpacking Business Improvement District. It was also one of the main events during the celebration of the New York Art Week.

== Collections ==
- Trilogía
- Skull Miami Colors
- Virgen de Guadalupe
- San Miguel Arcángel
- Palmarius
- Palmarius Colors
- Caballo Veloce
- Naia
- El Toro de Oro
