= Gimnasio Miguel Hidalgo (Poza Rica) =

Arena in Veracruz, Mexico

Gimnasio Municipal Miguel Hidalgo is a 2,500-seat indoor arena located in Poza Rica, Veracruz, Mexico. It was remodeled in 2009 at a cost of $1.5 million pesos. The renovations resulted in new seats and repairs to, and repainting of, all gymnasium facilities, plus the installation of air conditioning. The building was also waterproofed.

The gymnasium is used primarily for semiprofessional basketball, but can also accommodate lucha libre, boxing, concerts and other special events. Concert seating capacity is 3,500.
