= General Lucio Blanco International Airport =

International airport in Reynosa, Tamaulipas, Mexico

Reynosa International Airport Aeropuerto Internacional de Reynosa
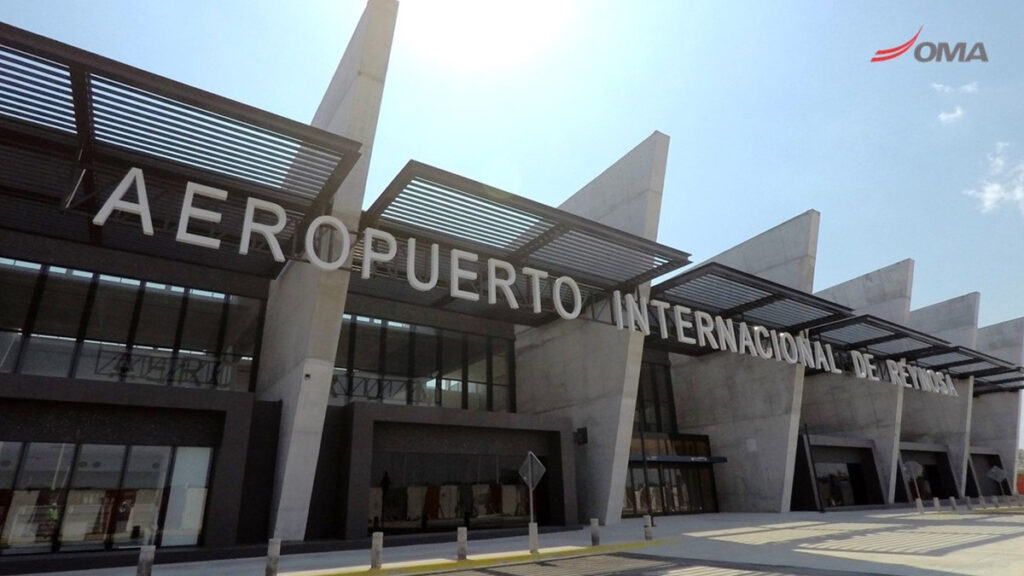
- IATA: REX; ICAO: MMRX

Summary
- Airport type: Public
- Operator: Grupo Aeroportuario Centro Norte
- Serves: Reynosa, Tamaulipas, Mexico
- Time zone: CST (UTC-06:00)
  - Summer (DST): CDT (UTC-05:00)
- Elevation AMSL: 42 m (138 ft)
- Coordinates: 26°00′32″N 098°13′42″W
- Website: www.oma.aero/en/passengers/reynosa/

Maps
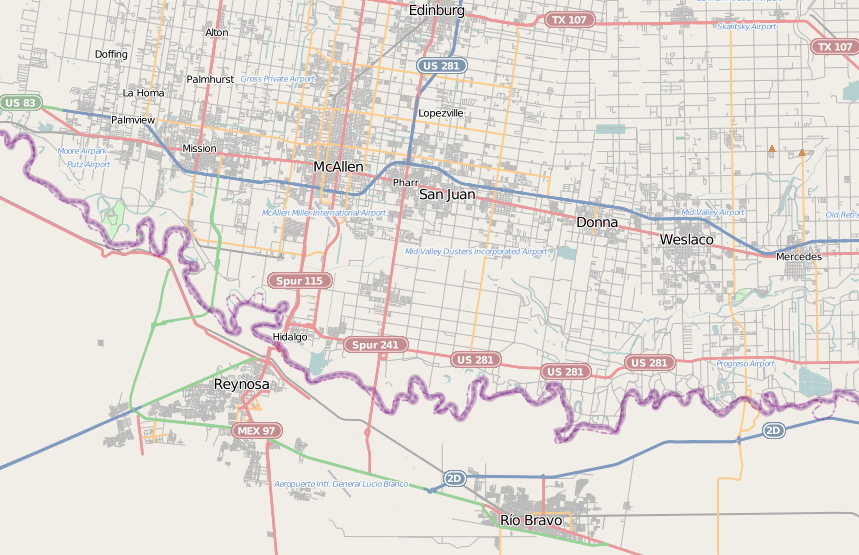

- Location of the airport in Tamaulipas REX (Mexico)

Runways
Direction	Length		Surface
Direction	m	ft	Surface
13/31	1,903	6,243	Asphalt

Statistics (2025)
- Total passengers: 441,178
- Ranking in Mexico: 40th ▼1
- Source: Grupo Aeroportuario Centro Norte.

Reynosa International Airport (Spanish: Aeropuerto Internacional de Reynosa); officially Aeropuerto Internacional General Lucio Blanco (General Lucio Blanco International Airport) (IATA: REX, ICAO: MMRX) is an international airport located in Reynosa, Tamaulipas, Mexico, near the Mexico–United States border. It serves the Metropolitan Area of Reynosa and the Reynosa–McAllen transborder agglomeration, facilitating multiple domestic destinations, cargo flights, flight training, and general aviation activities. The airport is the headquarters for Aerodavinci and is named after Lucio Blanco, a prominent figure of the Mexican Revolution. Operated by Grupo Aeroportuario Centro Norte, the airport handled 530,939 passengers in 2024 and 441,178 in 2025.

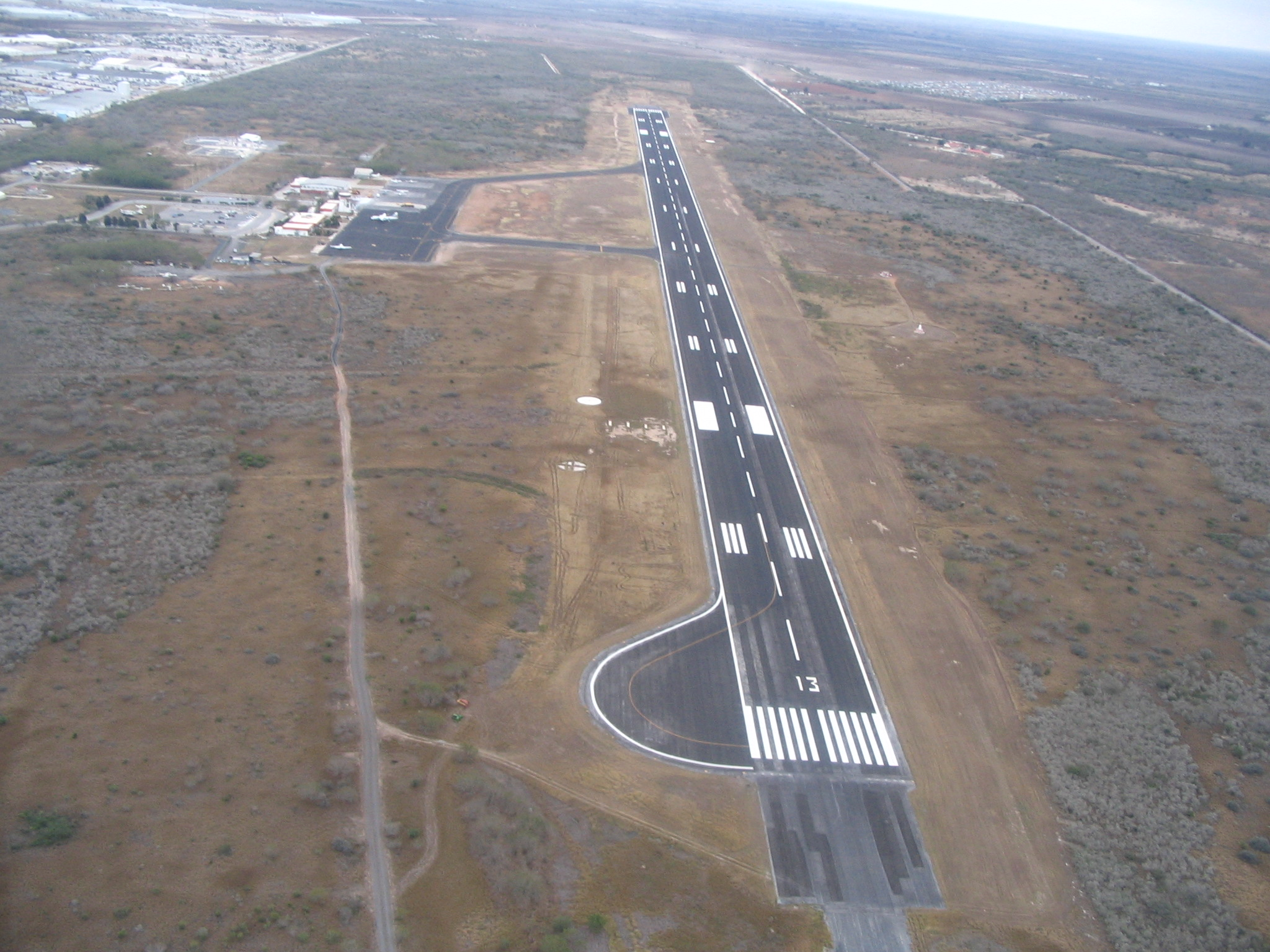
Aerial view of Reynosa Airport

== Facilities ==
The airport is located within the Reynosa urban area, approximately 10 kilometres (6.2 mi) southeast of Reynosa's city center. Situated at an elevation of 42 metres (138 ft) above mean sea level, it features a single 1,903-metre (6,243 ft) long runway and an apron equipped with four stands capable of accommodating narrow-body aircraft.

The passenger terminal underwent a comprehensive renovation and expansion in 2021. The two-story concrete structure, covering a total area of 7,538 square metres (81,140 sq ft), is now capable of handling up to 1 million passengers annually. The lower level encompasses the check-in area, an arrivals hall with a baggage claim area, immigration and customs facilities, car rental services, taxi stands, and snack bars. The upper floor houses the security checkpoint and the departures concourse, featuring a commercial area, a VIP lounge, and four gates, one of which has a jet bridge.

Adjacent to the terminal, additional facilities include civil aviation hangars and designated spaces for general aviation. The airport's close proximity to the U.S. border makes it an appealing choice for cross-border travelers heading to Mexican cities. However, due to its close proximity to McAllen and the high transportation taxes for international flights in Mexico, the airport currently serves exclusively domestic destinations. Passengers traveling to destinations in the United States typically utilize the McAllen Miller International Airport.

== Airlines and destinations ==
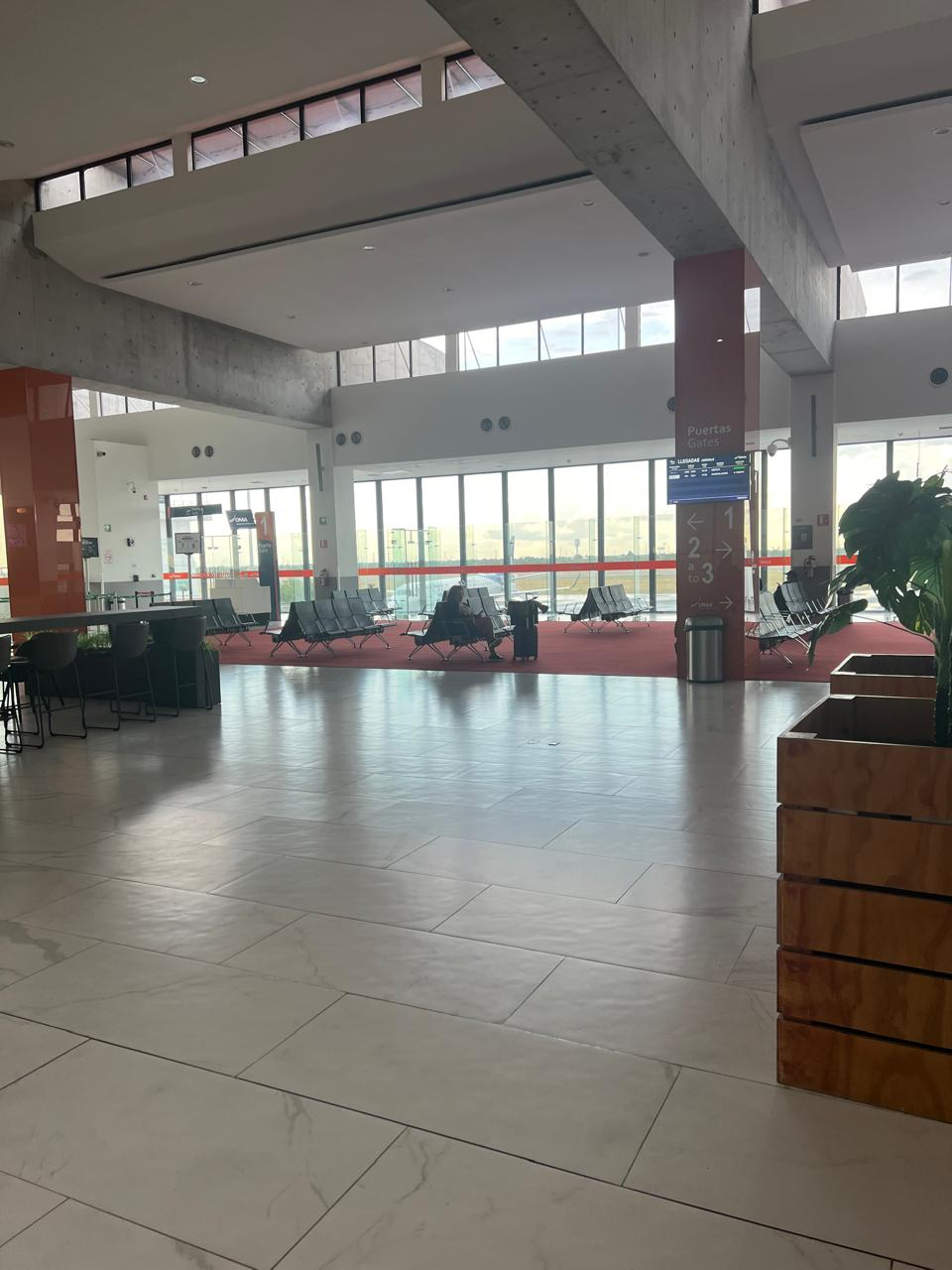
Last waiting room at the airport.

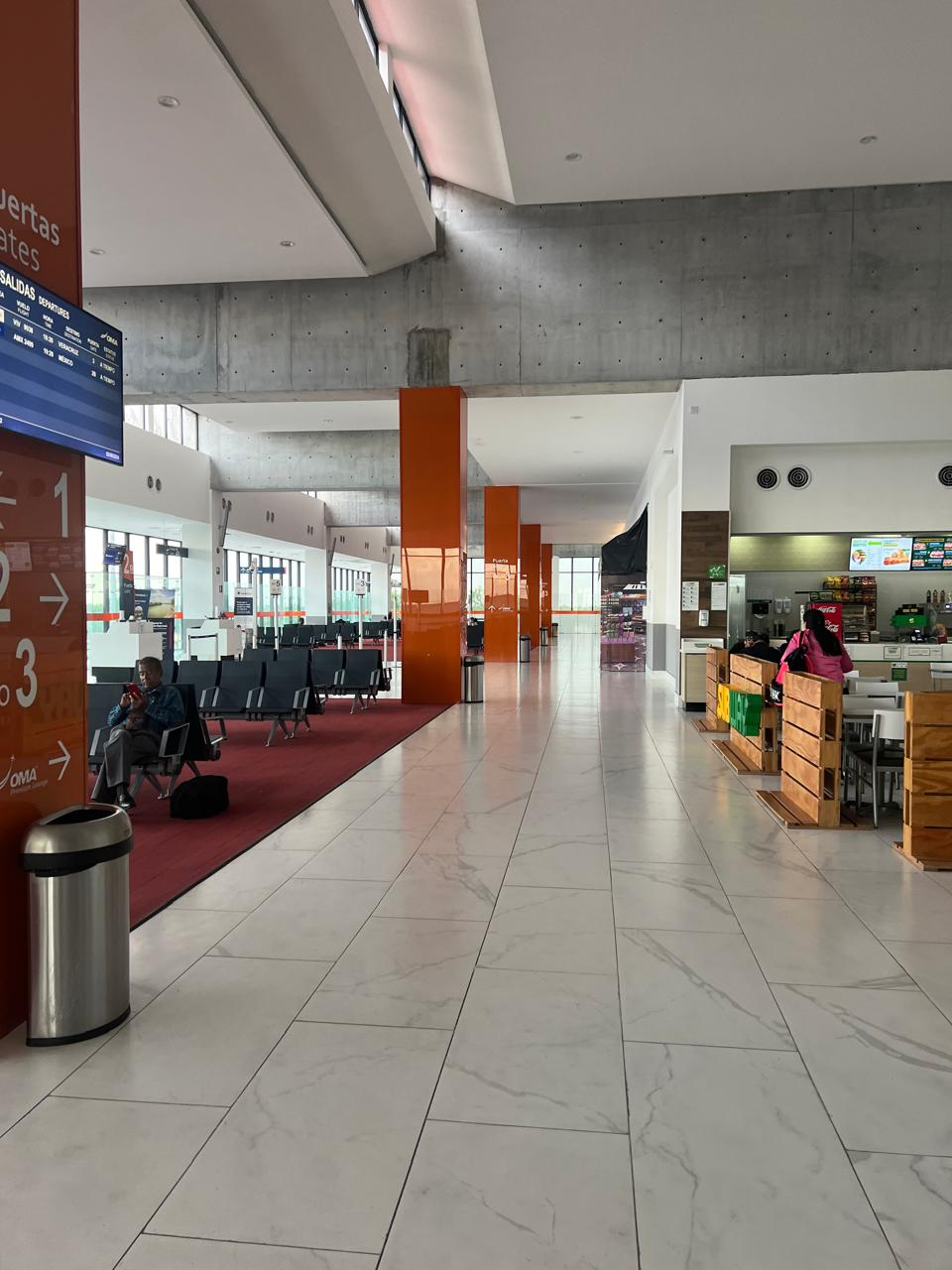
Last waiting room at the airport.

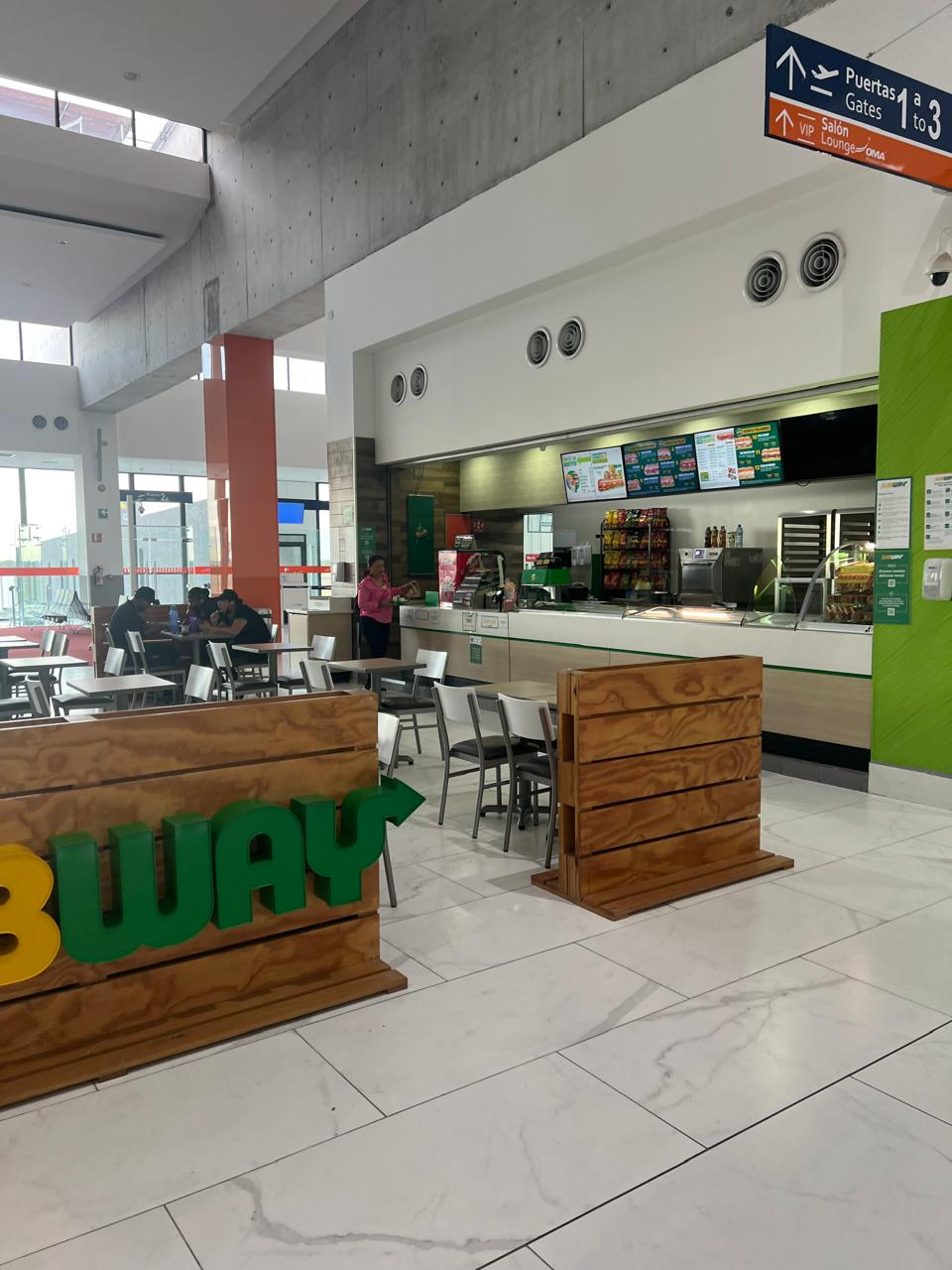
Fast food area at the airport.

=== Passenger ===
Airlines	Destinations
Aeroméxico	Mexico City–Benito Juárez
Aeroméxico Connect	Mexico City–Benito Juárez
Viva	Cancún, Guadalajara, Mexico City–Benito Juárez, Mexico City–Felipe Ángeles, Veracruz
Volaris	Guadalajara

=== Destinations map ===
Domestic destinations from Reynosa International Airport
Red = Year-round destination
Blue = Future destination
Green = Seasonal destination

== Statistics ==
=== Annual Traffic ===
Passenger statistics at REX
Year	Total Passengers	change %
2006	136,991	Steady
2007	191,326	▲39.66%
2008	247,339	▲29.28%
2009	215,392	▼12.91%
2010	198,138	▼8.01%
2011	216,599	▲9.32%
2012	302,934	▲39.86%
2013	392,206	▲29.47%
2014	472,027	▲20.35%
2015	507,186	▲7.45%
2016	563,952	▲11.19%
2017	482,661	▼14.41%
2018	466,934	▼3.26%
2019	480,524	▲2.91%
2020	229,058	▼52.33%
2021	425,918	▲85.94%
2022	518,051	▲21.63%
2023	540,122	▲4.26%
2024	530,939	▼1.7%
2025	441,178	▼16.9%

=== Busiest routes ===
Busiest routes from REX (Jan–Dec 2025)
Rank	Airport	Passengers
1	Mexico City, Mexico City	103,129
2	Guadalajara, Jalisco	31,341
3	Mexico City–AIFA, State of Mexico	30,922
3	Cancún, Quintana Roo	25,408
4	Veracruz, Veracruz	19,844

== Accidents and incidents ==
- In 2000, Aeroméxico Flight 250, a DC-9-31 jet, overran the runway and crashed. Four people on the ground were killed.

== See also ==
- List of the busiest airports in Mexico
- List of airports in Mexico
- List of airports by ICAO code: M
- List of busiest airports in North America
- List of the busiest airports in Latin America
- Transportation in Mexico
- Tourism in Mexico
- Grupo Aeroportuario Centro Norte
