= Tihuatlán =

Settlement in the Mexican state of Veracruz

- City and municipality
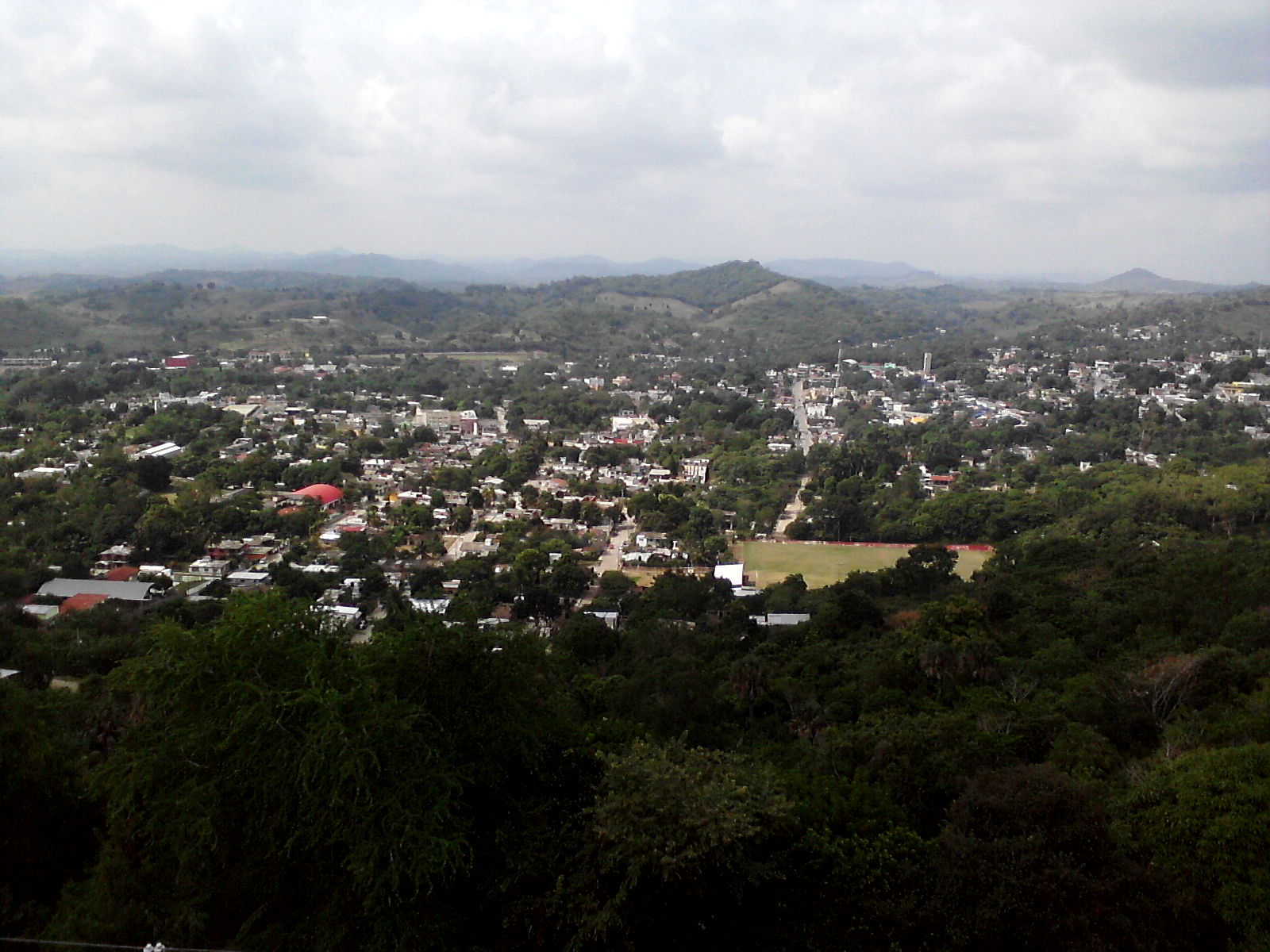
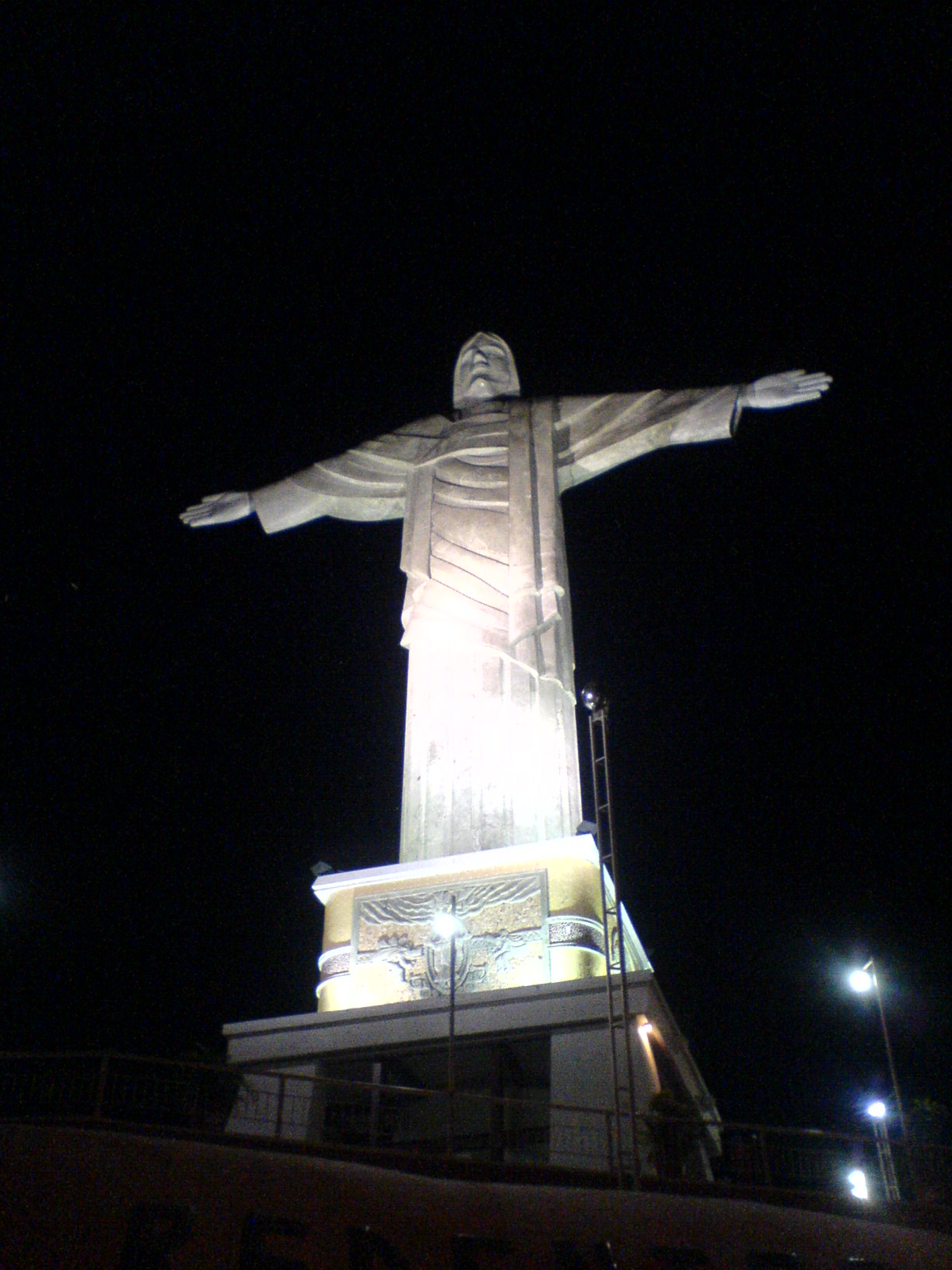
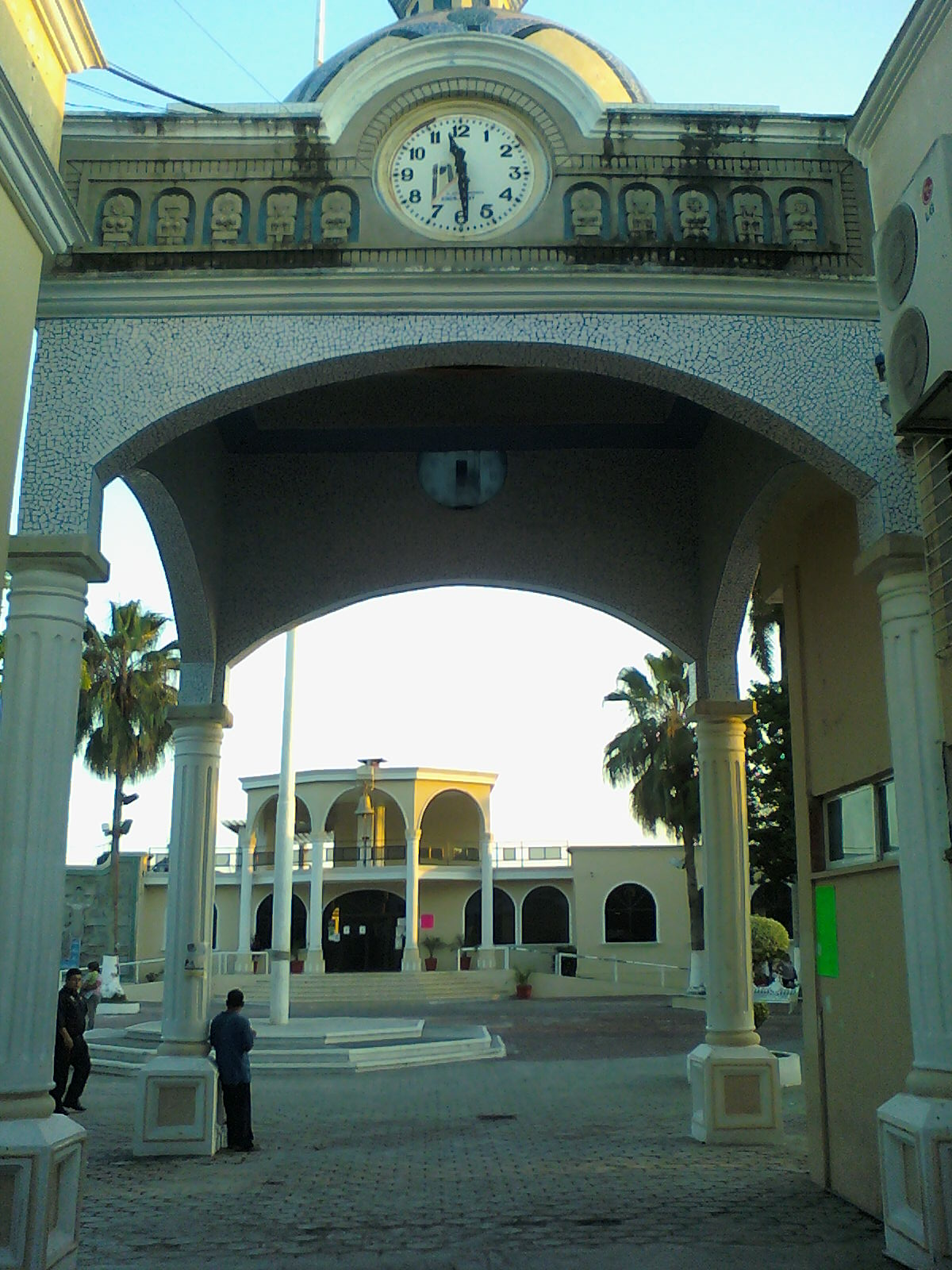
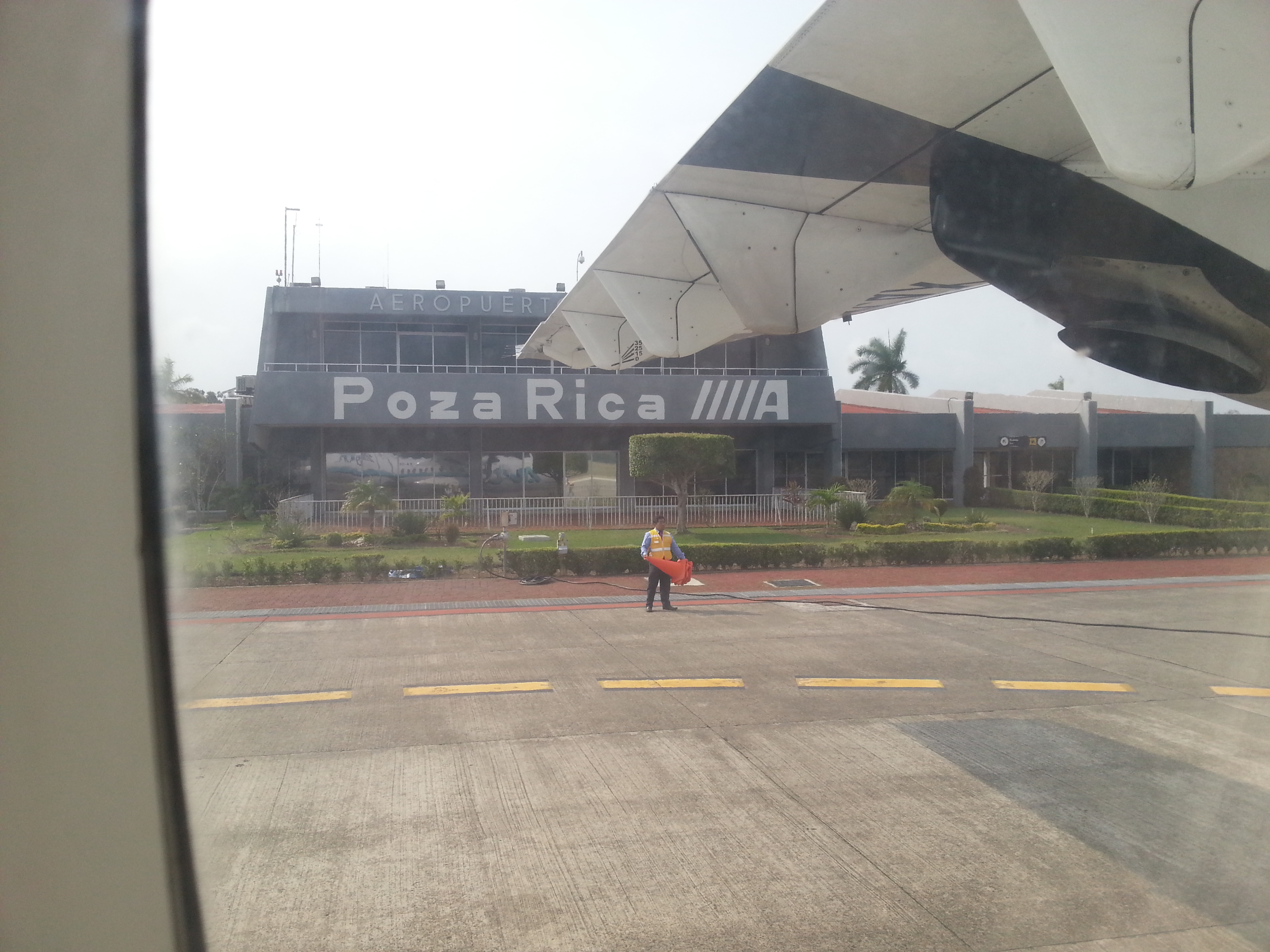
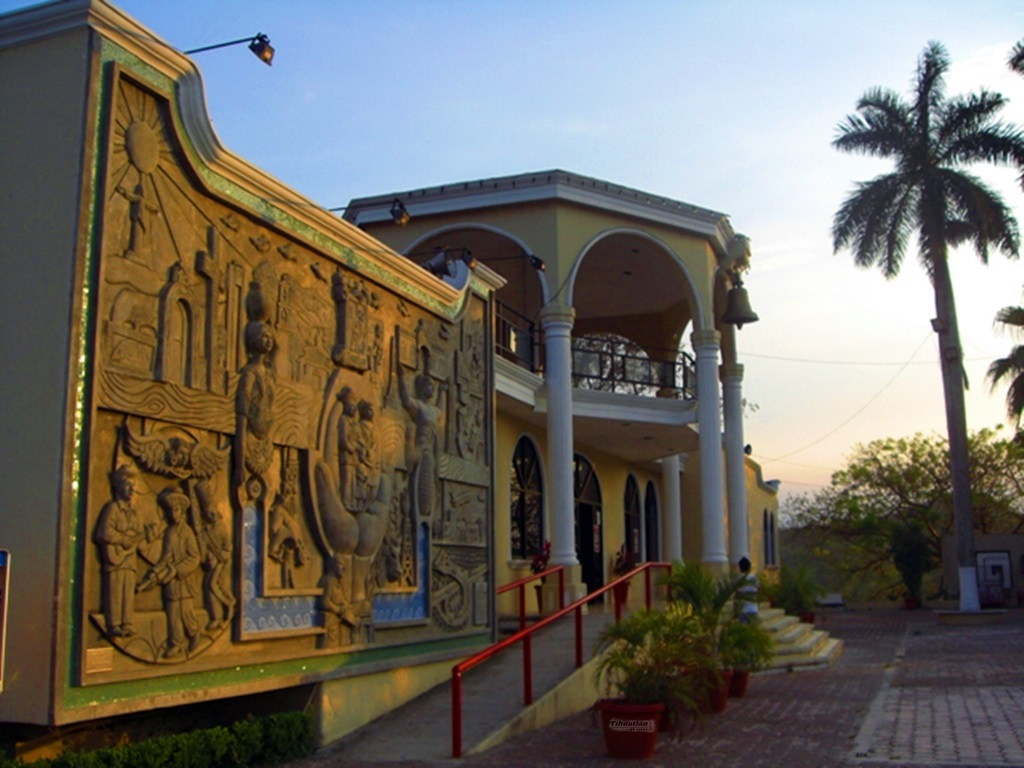
- Top: Panoramic view of Tihuatlán; Middle: Statue of Christ the Redeemer at night, Juárez Park; Bottom:El Tajín National Airport, Identity Mural at Juárez Park

- Coat of arms

- Location within Veracruz Location within Mexico
- Coordinates: 20.7161412°N 97.5438963°W
- Country: Mexico
- State: Veracruz
- Foundation: 1598

Government
  - Municipal president: Raúl Hernández Gallardo (PRD)
  - Federal electoral district: Veracruz's 5th

Area
  - Total: 718.8 km^{2} (277.5 sq mi)

Population (2020)
  - Total: 92,276
  - Density: 129/km^{2} (330/sq mi)
  - Seat: 15,305
- Time zone: UTC-6 (Zona Centro)
- Website: Official Website

Historical population
| Year | Pop. | ±% |
|---|---|---|
| 1995 | 81,660 | — |
| 2000 | 81,088 | −0.7% |
| 2005 | 80,923 | −0.2% |
| 2010 | 89,774 | +10.9% |
| 2015 | 96,418 | +7.4% |
| 2020 | 92,726 | −3.8% |

Tihuatlán is a city and its surrounding municipality located in the north of the Mexican state of Veracruz, about 316 km (196 mi) from the state capital Xalapa. The municipality has a surface of 828.29 km^{2} (319.80 sq mi). The municipality reported a population of 92,726 inhabitants in the 2020 INEGI census; however, only 16% reside in the municipal seat.

== Name ==
The name comes from the Nahuatl cihua-tlan, which means "place of women".

== Geography ==
Tihuatlán is delimited to the north by the municipalities of Temapache and Tuxpan, to the east by Papantla, Poza Rica and Cazones de Herrera, to the south by Coatzintla, and to the south-west by the state of Puebla. It is watered by the rivers Cazones and Tontepec, which end in the Gulf of Mexico.

The weather in Tihuatlán is warm and wet all year with rains in summer and autumn.

Culturally, Tihuatlán belongs to the Huasteca veracruzana region.

== Agriculture ==
The municipality primarily produces maize, beans, green chile and oranges.

== Celebrations ==
In October, a celebration takes place in honor of Saint Francis of Assisi, the patron saint of the town, and in December a celebration in honor of the Virgin of Guadalupe is held.

== Transportation ==
El Tajín National Airport is located in Tihuatlán.
