= Gaudencio Hernández Burgos =

Mexican politician

- Born: 19 June 1962 (age 63); Hidalgo, Mexico
- Occupation: Deputy
- Political party: PRI

Gaudencio Hernández Burgos (born 19 June 1962) is a Mexican politician affiliated with the Institutional Revolutionary Party (PRI). In the 2012 general election he was elected to the Chamber of Deputies to represent the fifth district of Veracruz during the 62nd Congress.
