= Philippine Airlines Flight 124 =

Aircraft accident (Philippine Airlines)

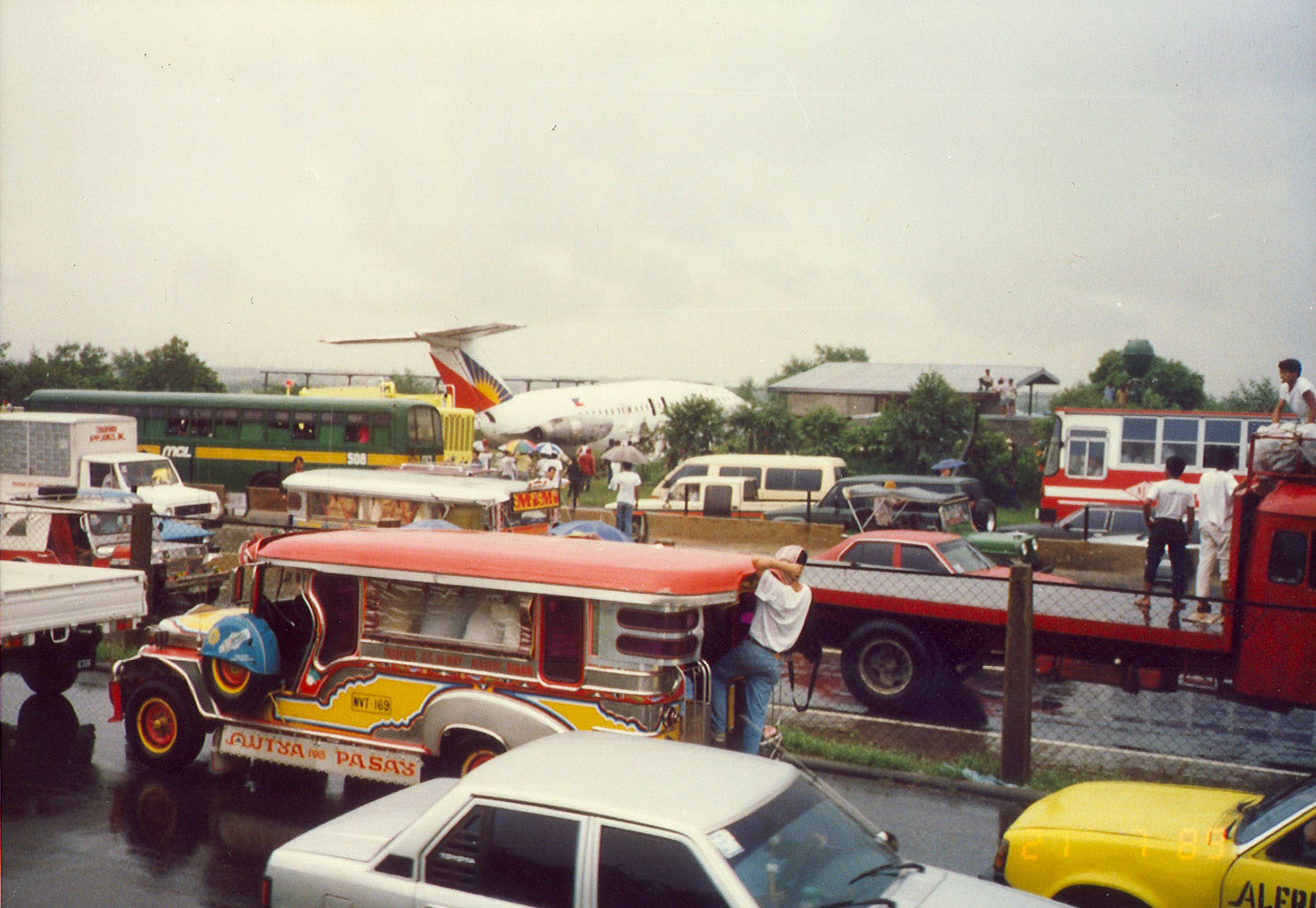
- Flight 124 after overrunning Runway 06

Accident
- Date: July 21, 1989
- Summary: Runway overrun in bad weather, incorrect approach configuration
- Site: Manila International Airport, Manila, Philippines
- Total fatalities: 8
- Total injuries: 106

Aircraft
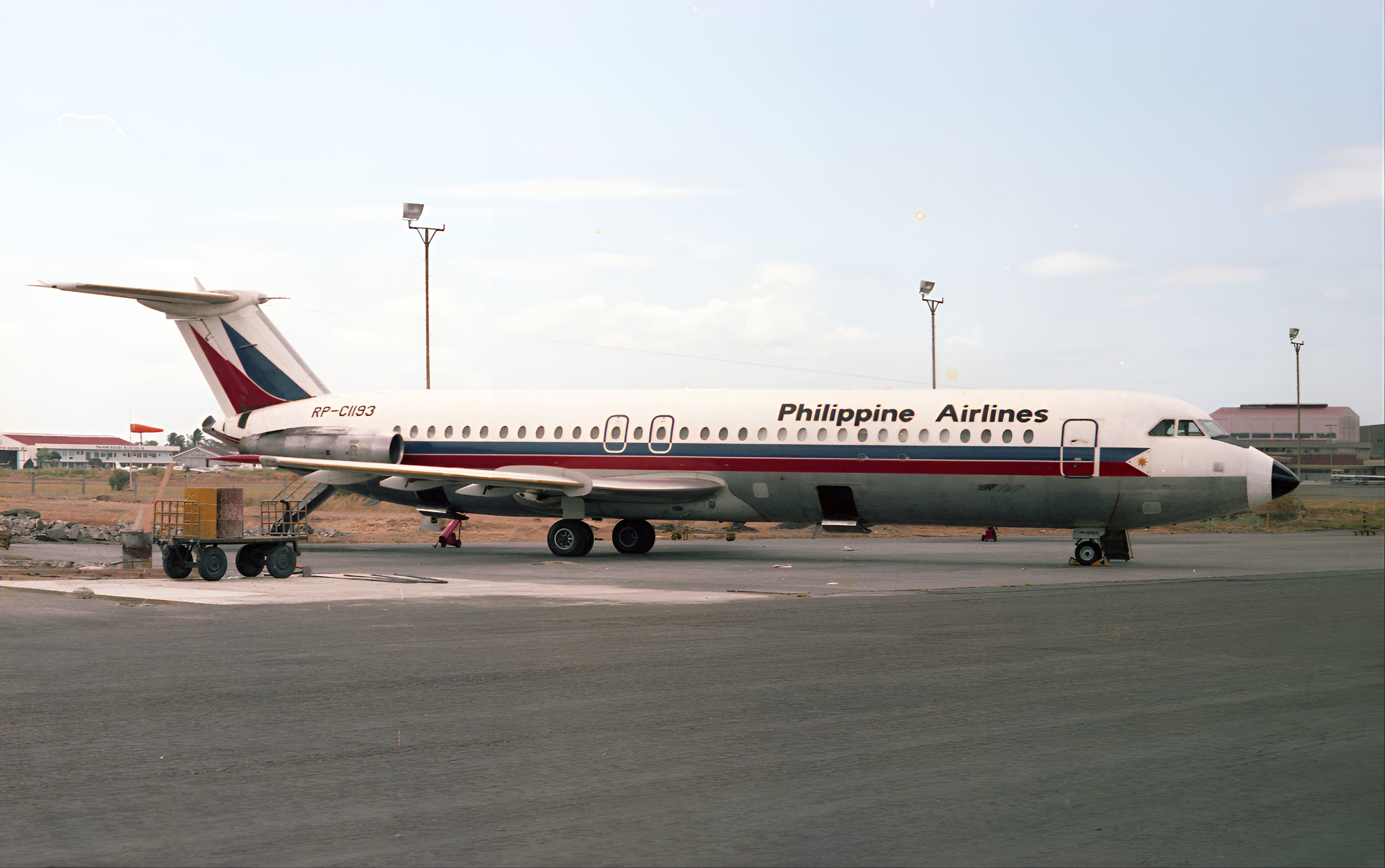
- RP-C1193, the aircraft involved in the accident, seen in 1983 with a previous livery
- Aircraft type: BAC One-Eleven-516FP
- Operator: Philippine Airlines
- Registration: RP-C1193
- Flight origin: Zamboanga International Airport
- Destination: Manila International Airport
- Passengers: 93
- Crew: 5
- Fatalities: 0
- Injuries: 87
- Survivors: 98

Ground casualties
- Ground fatalities: 8
- Ground injuries: 19

Philippine Airlines Flight 124 was a domestic flight operated by Philippine Airlines that departed from Zamboanga International Airport, Zamboanga City to Manila International Airport, Manila.

On July 21, 1989, the aircraft skidded and overran Manila's Runway 06, losing its undercarriage and running onto a motorway, striking vehicles and killing eight people on the ground. The aircraft was written off.

== Aircraft ==
The aircraft was a BAC One-Eleven Series 500 manufactured in Hurn, and had its first flight in December 1970. It was delivered to Philippine Airlines as PI-C1191 before being transferred to Guatemalan airline Aviateca in March 1971, where it was re-registered to TG-AZA and named Quetzal. It remained in their fleet before being returned to Philippine Airlines in July 1980 and registered as RP-C1193. It had two Rolls-Royce Spey turbofan engines.

== Accident ==
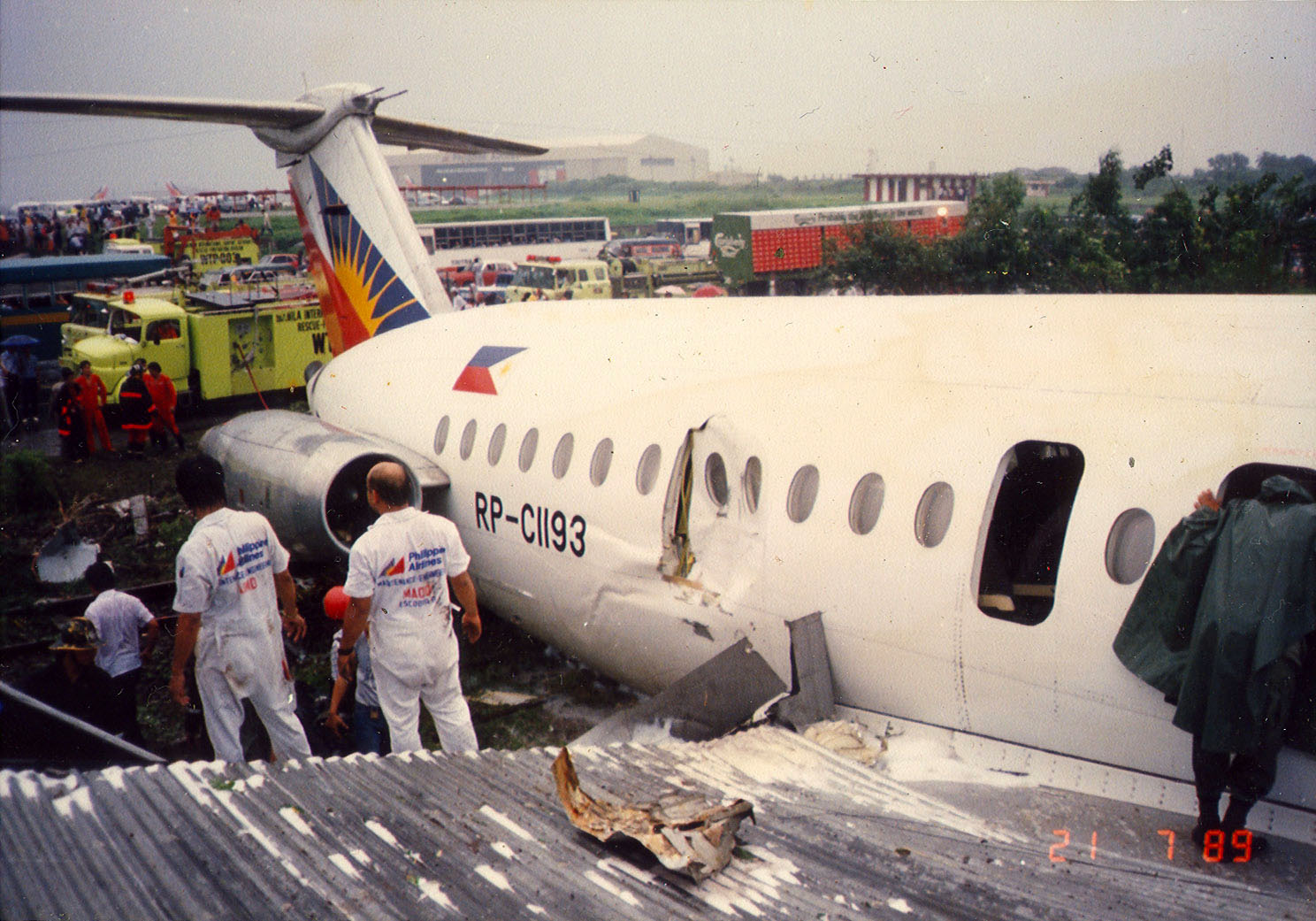

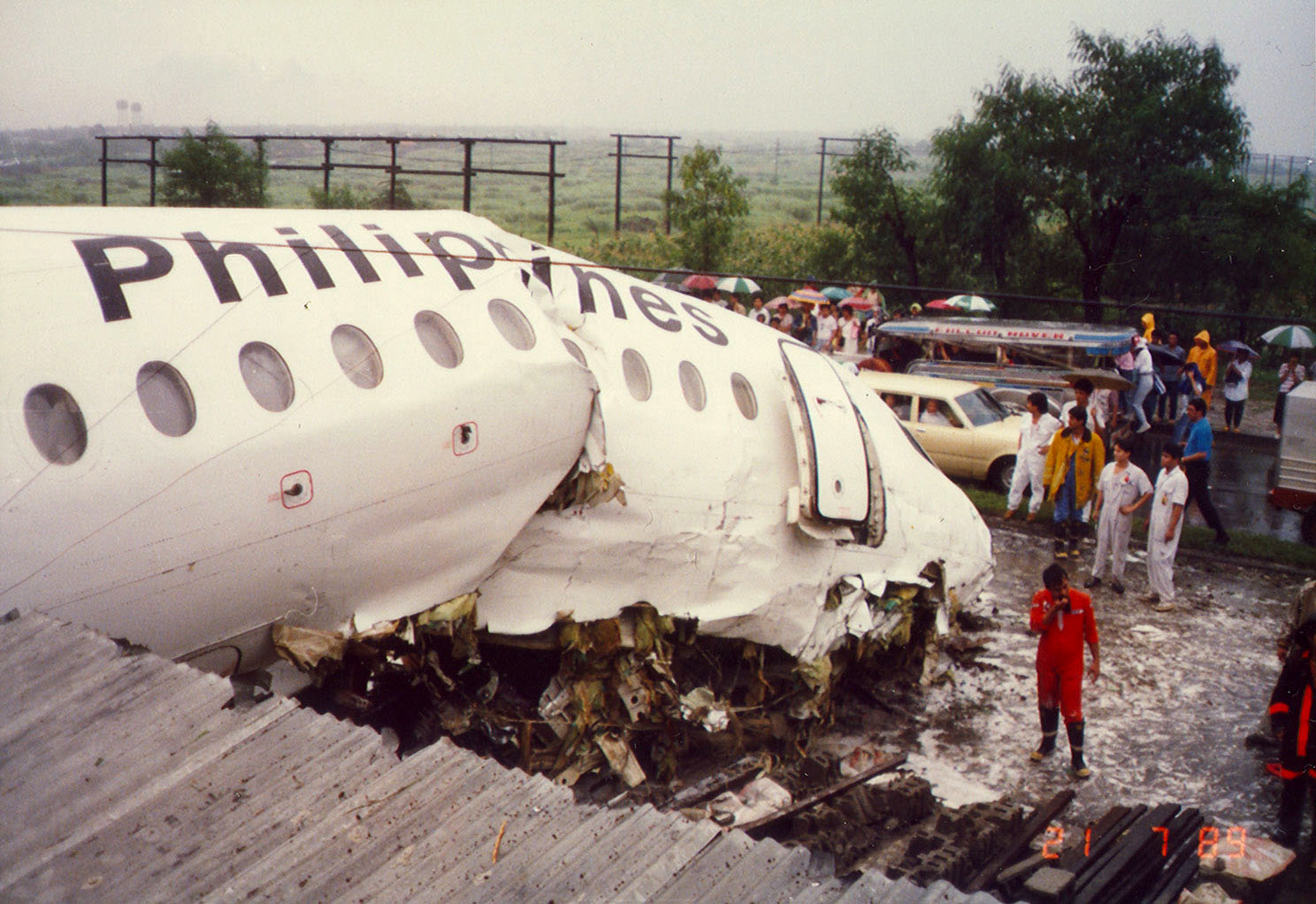
Wreckage of RP-C1193 after the overrun showing the fuselage ripped open

Philippine Airlines Flight 124 took off from Zamboanga in the afternoon and was uneventful until the approach at Manila, where the flight encountered poor weather conditions with strong winds and heavy rain.

On final approach, the pilots were informed by ATC that their glideslope was too high and that it was better to initiate a go-around. However, the captain insisted on continuing the approach, and the aircraft bounced and touched down late on Runway 06. Because of heavy rainfall, the brakes did not work effectively across the wet runway. Unable to stop with the remaining distance, the aircraft struck a concrete wall and lost its undercarriage before skidding onto the South Luzon Expressway, striking cars and coming to rest on a railroad track.

8 people were killed on the ground after being struck. The aircraft was written off.

== Cause ==
The accident has been attributed to many factors, with errors by the crew exacerbated by the bad weather conditions at the time. The crew failed to initiate a go-around and follow warnings from ATC, and the aircraft landed too far down the runway so that stopping distance was insufficient. Visibility and braking action were poor because of thick clouds and rain.
