= Poza Rica =

Poza Rica Poza Rica de Hidalgo
- Municipality
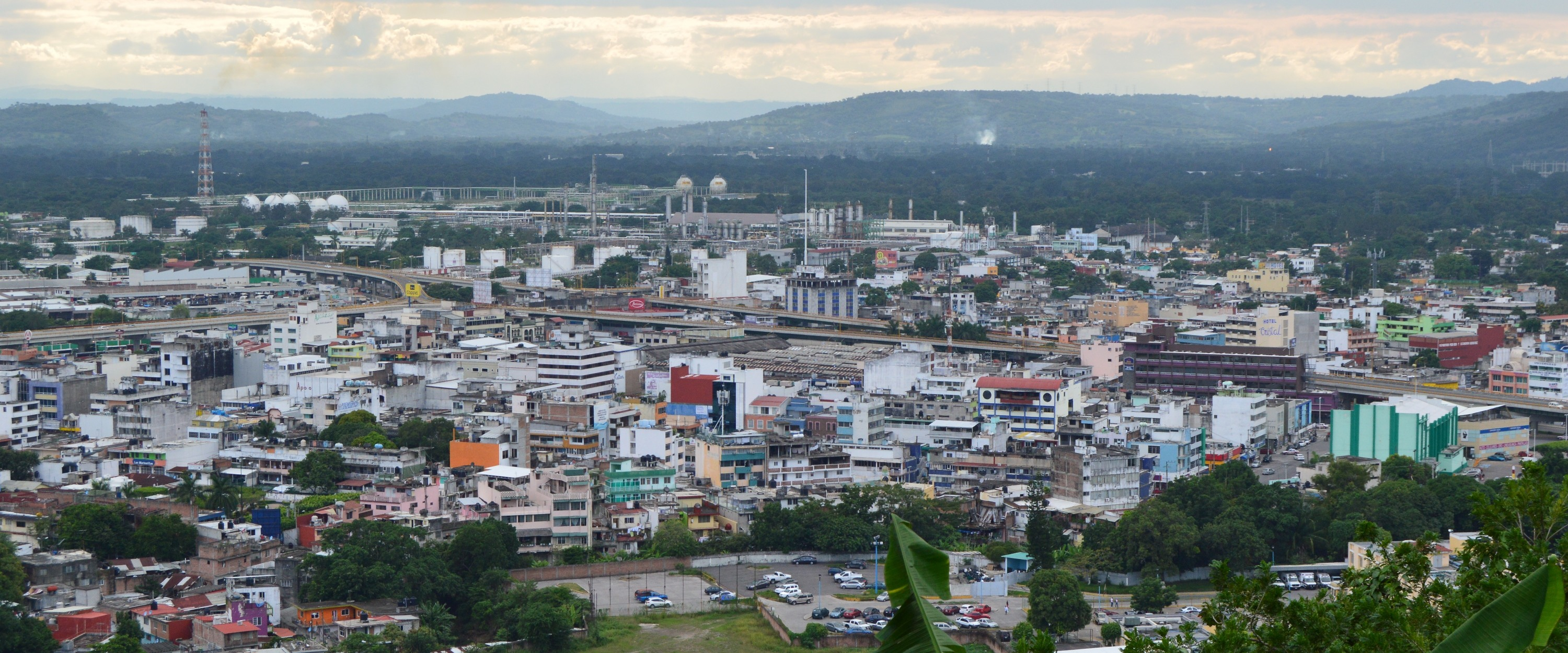
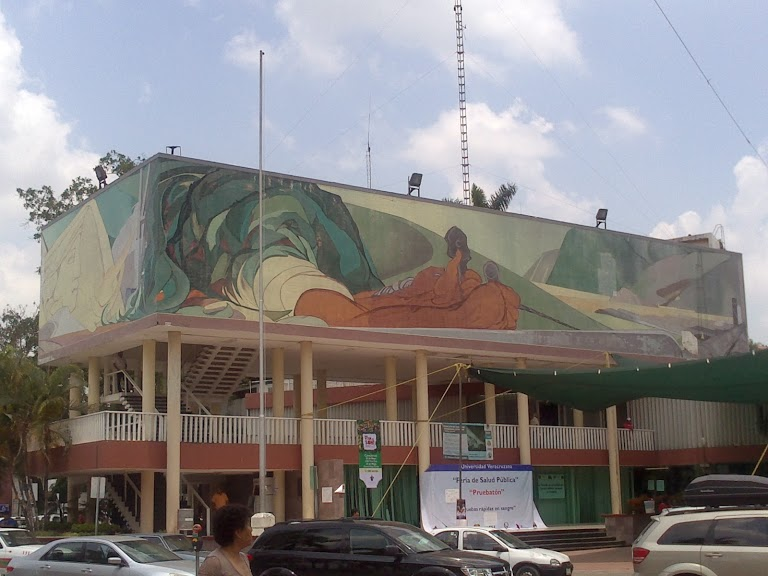
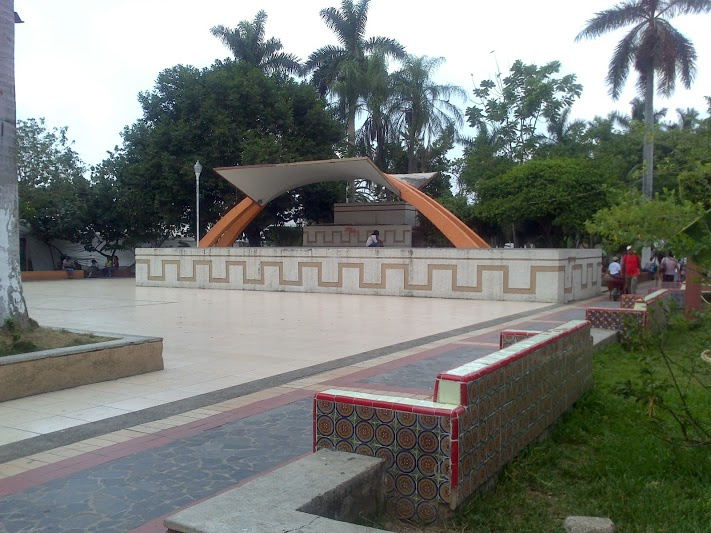
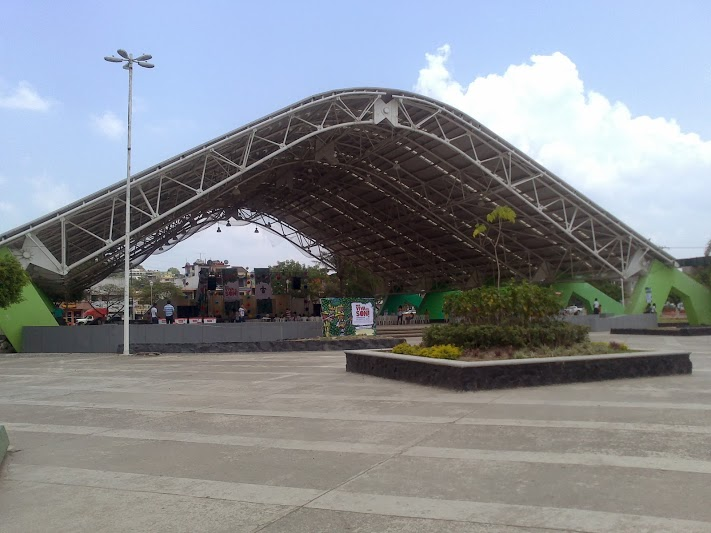
- Top: Panoramic view of Poza Rica; Middle: Poza Rica City Hall, Juárez Park; Bottom: 18 March Dome, Oil workers monument

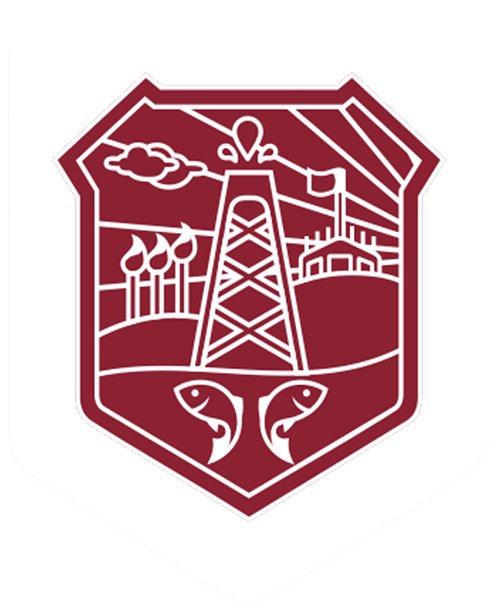
- Coat of arms

- Location in Mexico Poza Rica (Mexico)
- Coordinates: 20°32′N 97°27′W
- Country: Mexico
- State: Veracruz
- Region: Totonaca Region
- Founded: November 20, 1951

Government
  - Mayor: Fernando Luis Remes Garza (MORENA)

Area
  - Total: 64 km^{2} (25 sq mi)
- Elevation: 50 m (160 ft)

Population (2020)
  - Total: 189,457
  - Density: 2,962.6/km^{2} (7,673/sq mi)
  - Seat: 180,057
  - Metro: 521,080
  - Metro density: 186.65/km^{2} (483.4/sq mi)
- Time zone: UTC-6 (Central (US Central))
- Postal code: 93261
- Area code: 782
- Website: Gobierno de Poza Rica

Historical population
| Year | Pop. | ±% |
|---|---|---|
| 1995 | 154,586 | — |
| 2000 | 152,838 | −1.1% |
| 2005 | 181,438 | +18.7% |
| 2010 | 193,311 | +6.5% |
| 2015 | 200,119 | +3.5% |
| 2020 | 189,457 | −5.3% |

Poza Rica (Spanish pronunciation: [ˈposa ˈrika]), formally Poza Rica de Hidalgo, is a city and its surrounding municipality in the Mexican state of Veracruz. Its name means "rich well/pond". It is often thought that the name came to be because it was a place known for its abundance of oil. In reality, before oil was discovered, there existed a pond rich in fish, which gave origin to the city’s name. In the 20th century oil was discovered in the area. It has since been almost completely extracted. This has resulted in the decline of oil well exploration and drilling activities, though there are still many oil facilities.

The city shares borders with the municipalities of Papantla, Tihuatlán, and Coatzintla, and stands on Federal Highway 180. The archaeological zone of El Tajín is located approximately 15 kilometers (9.3 mi) from Poza Rica. The area is tropical, with two beaches within one hour, Tuxpan, and Tecolutla, and one within 40 minutes east, Cazones. Mexico City is about 220 kilometers (140 mi) from Poza Rica.Unlike most Mexican cities, it does not have old buildings because it is a new city founded officially on November 20, 1951. For that reason it has contemporary architecture with well-lined and designed streets with a modern look.

While the petroleum industry features heavily amongst the industrial landscape in Poza Rica, the city also has a wide variety of other industries with a large middle class. As one of the largest and most populous cities in Veracruz, Poza Rica is an important industrial and commercial center, and a central hub for several road transportation lines. The city has recently seen much growth, with several shopping malls opening around the city. The city had an official population of 180,057 inhabitants and the municipality had 189,457 at the census of 2020. However, the Poza Rica metropolitan area, which includes the municipalities of Cazones de Herrera, Coatzintla, Papantla and Tihuatlán, showed a total population of 521,080.

== Main Attractions ==
Poza Rica is close to the Costa Esmeralda, the northern beaches of Veracruz, such as Tecolutla, Tuxpan, Cazones and Playa Esmeralda. The UNESCO World Heritage Site of El Tajin is 15 kilometers (9.3 mi) away. The downtown area presents shopping opportunities. It has a high viewing point called "El cerro del abuelo" where it's possible to see the whole city and its "quemadores", big petroleum burners which were used to light the city in the early years. A few of them remain.

The annual "Desfile del 18 de marzo" (March 18 Parade, "Petroleum Day") commemorates Mexican oil expropriation and has two parades, one in the morning and one in the afternoon. The city's populace is predominantly young. Though there are few expatriates, a few English-language schools employ teachers for locals and PEMEX employees.

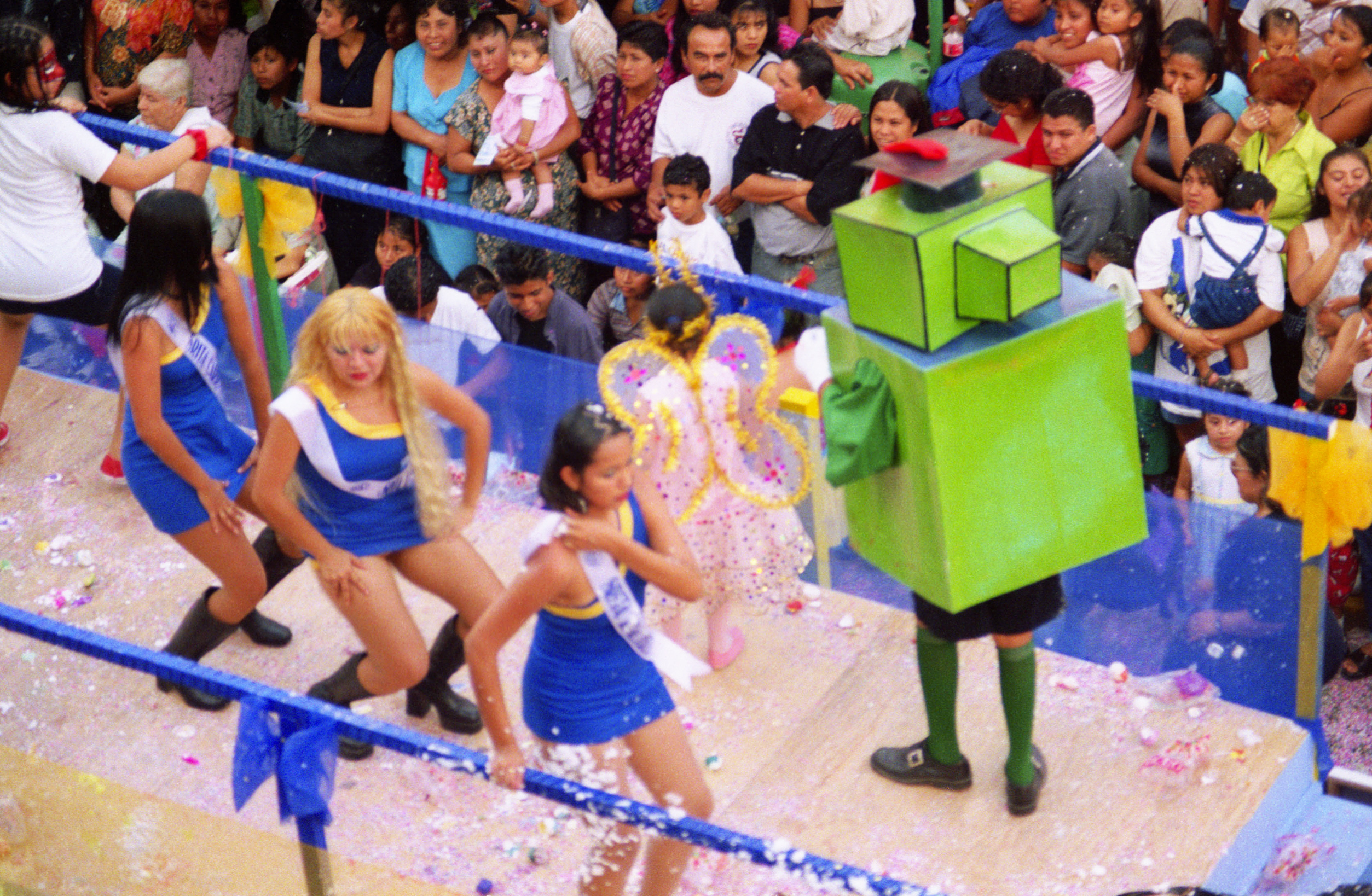
Petroleum Day dancers

== Economy ==
Recently the city has experienced a revival in economic activity, driven by investments in oil production by the parastatal PEMEX company. The economy is driven by trade, the petroleum industry, fashion, and tourism. This has brought a boom in trade, which together with its strategic location and concentration of services, causes a daily flow of residents from other towns, municipalities and nearby cities like Papantla, Gutiérrez Zamora, Tecolutla, Martínez de la Torre and Tihuatlán in the state of Veracruz. This extends its area of influence of the neighboring towns and villages State of Puebla that converge to it for various reasons, among which are health, employment, education or shopping, as it is located in the major centers of supply, trade and services.

The city of Poza Rica has three malls: Plaza Gran Patio Poza Rica, Crystal Square and Poza Rica Square.

== Neighborhoods ==
The city consists of five neighborhoods (The 5 Barrios de Poza Rica).

- Poza Rica Center is the commercial center of the city.
- 52 is an area which is northeast of the city which also has markets and busy shopping centers and the GREAT PATIO Commercial Square.
- Totolapa is the third area of the city located across the bridge of Poza Rica.
- Petromex is one of the colonies where most of the pozarricenses, citizens of Poza Rica, reside.
- Arroyo del Maiz is the area which houses the Tecnológico de Poza Rica, also Conalep School.

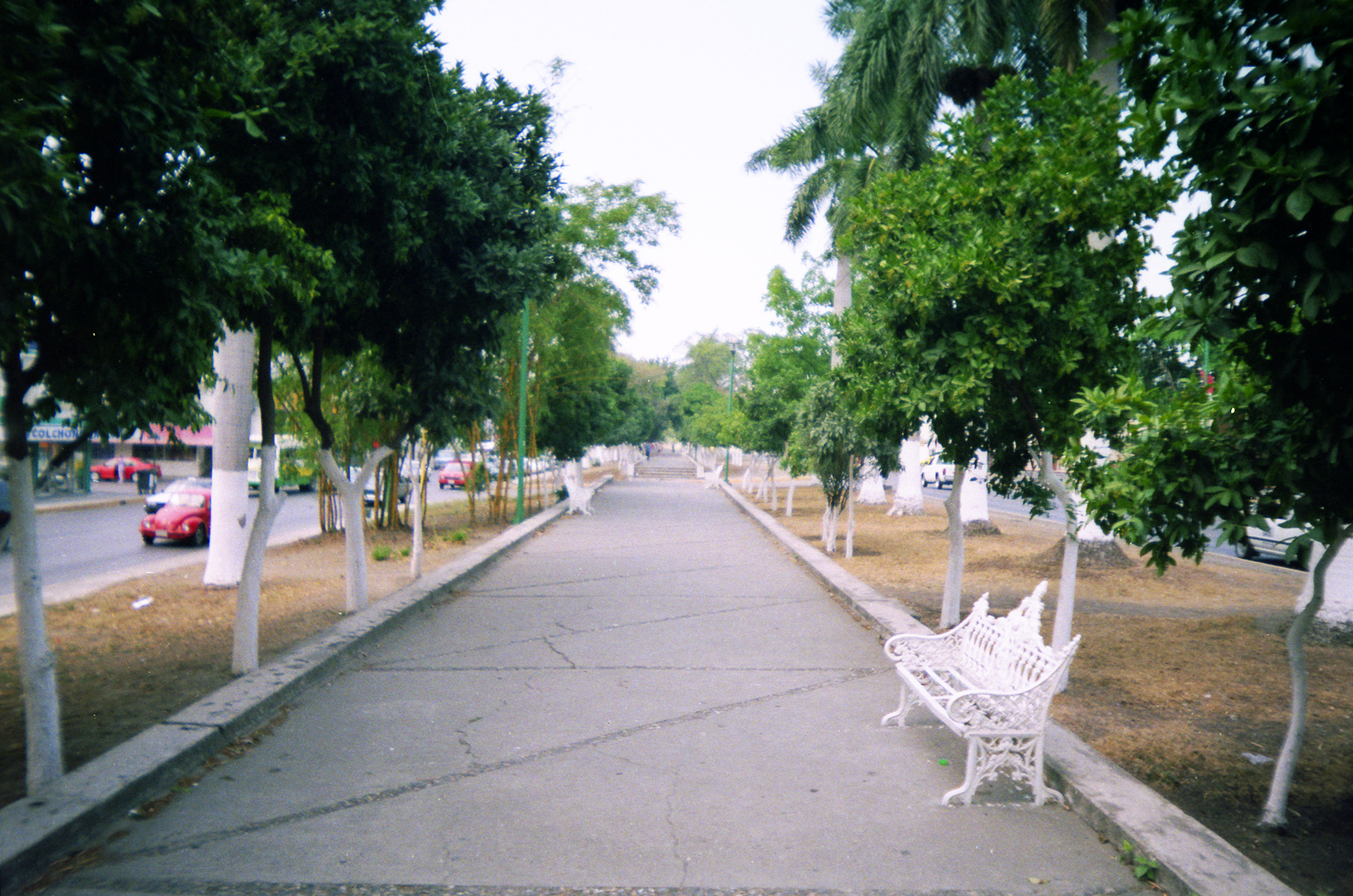
Ruiz Cortinez Boulevard walkway

== Parks ==
The city of Poza Rica has 36 parks. The most important are:

- Parque Plaza March 18. It is the city's central park is located between Avenues Lázaro Cárdenas and Calle 8 Norte. It has an auditorium for musical events. It also attracts young people who practice hobbies such as rollerblading and biking.
- Juarez Park. It is the second-largest park in the city, located on 16th Avenue West.
- Parque de las Americas. The park features all the flags of America, and is located on the hillside.

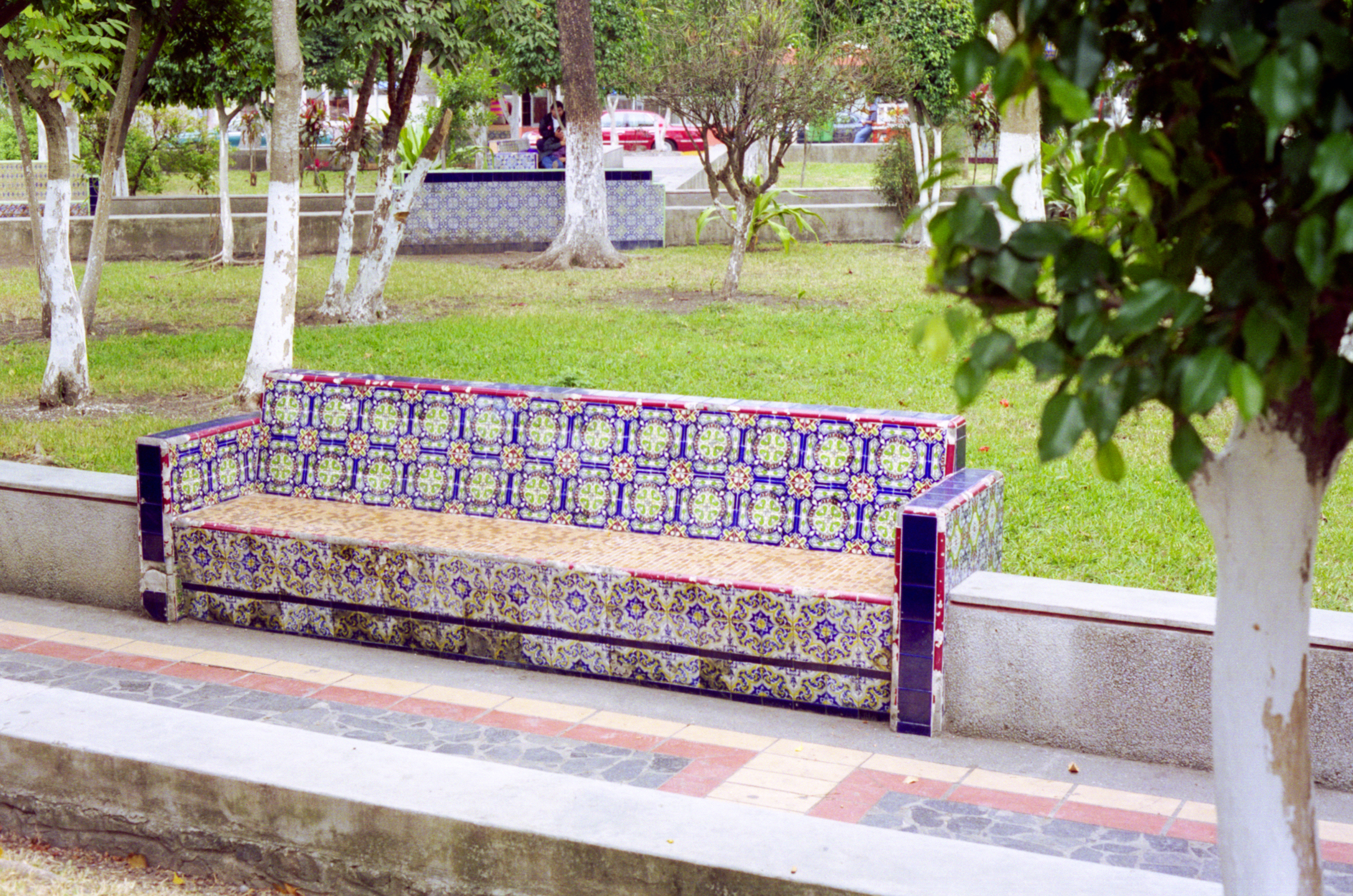
Juarez Park

== Sights ==
The city has 18 monuments.

== Education ==
The city has:

5 Nurseries 81 Preschools 110 Elementary schools 46 Public and private high schools 36 Baccalaureate programs 2 Adult Education programs 10 Universities, including 7 private and 3 public

Major universities in the city are the UV Universidad Veracruzana, University Spanish America, the Gulf of Mexico University, the University of the Huasteca, and Technological Poza Rica.

The city has 21 public libraries. The most important are:

- Library Adolfo Rendon Rendon. Located in Central East and Cologne Petromex.
- Lira Francisco Lara Library. Located in the Parque Juárez.
- Founders Library. Located in Chapultepec street corner in Colonia Francisco Sarabia Manuel Avila Camacho.

== Transport ==
Public transport is the main means of transport of pozarricenses. Transport in the city are buses that take you to different areas of the city, as well as shared taxis.

Poza Rica taxis are the tsuru model that move around the city.

Central Bus Terminal: For land transport with the rest of the country, Poza Rica has three bus terminals:

- The North Central, where more than 30 lines come from across the country (Estrella Blanca, ADO, Axis Gulf, First Plus, Chihuahuan, AU, PLATINUM ADO, ADO GL, Premium Green, Futura, Omnibus de Mexico)
- the second terminal has access only to passengers going to the neighboring city of Tuxpan. (ADO Bus)
- The third terminal is in the Petromex (Alternate Petroleum), which exits south of the country (Xalapa, Veracruz, Coatzacoalcos, Villahermosa, Ciudad del Carmen, Chiapas, etc.)

El Tajín National Airport in Tihuatlán serves Poza Rica.

== Religion ==
Most pozarricenses profess the Catholic faith, but there are groups of Pentecostals, Latter-day Saints, Jehovah's Witnesses, evangelical Christians, and Baptists, among others.

== Urban culture ==
In the city are various youth groups like emos, skaters, Punk, Rappers, Cholos, reggaeton, Rastafarians, metalheads, Goths, Darcketos, Popular, Zoot, Hippies and kpopers.

== Tourism ==
Tourism is a major economic activities of the city as each year thousands of national and international tourists comes into the city, though most are from Mexico City, Guadalajara, Puebla, Pachuca, Monterrey, Tulancingo, Reynosa, Matamoros, McAllen, Dallas, and Houston. The main destinations are the beach which is just 45 kilometers from the city center as well as the archaeological site of El Tajin, where every year a summit is held. Another attraction is the Tajin Teayo Castle.

== Food ==
As for the local cuisine, this is distinguished by typical regional dishes Totonac and Huastec, of which the best known is the Zacahuil, plus a variety of typical Mexican snacks, among which are sopes, bocoles, molotes, tlacoyos, enchiladas, and blanditas.

== Sports ==
Football, baseball, and basketball are sports that are practiced in Poza Rica. The city has a third-rank football team. A professional division called Poza Rica Oil has a team in the second. Another division is called Los Lobos. During the oil splendor the city had a professional baseball team. The Ranger Soccer is considered high quality football. It excels in the football tournament of the Barrios, an event that is organized by the newspaper La Opinión and of which the founder was José Hernández Soto, a character linked to major sporting events in the city. The city has a football stadium located at Heriberto Jara Corona in the northern part of the city, which is home to the Oilers in Poza Rica, and the 2500 seat Gimnasio Municipal Miguel Hidalgo.

== Geography ==
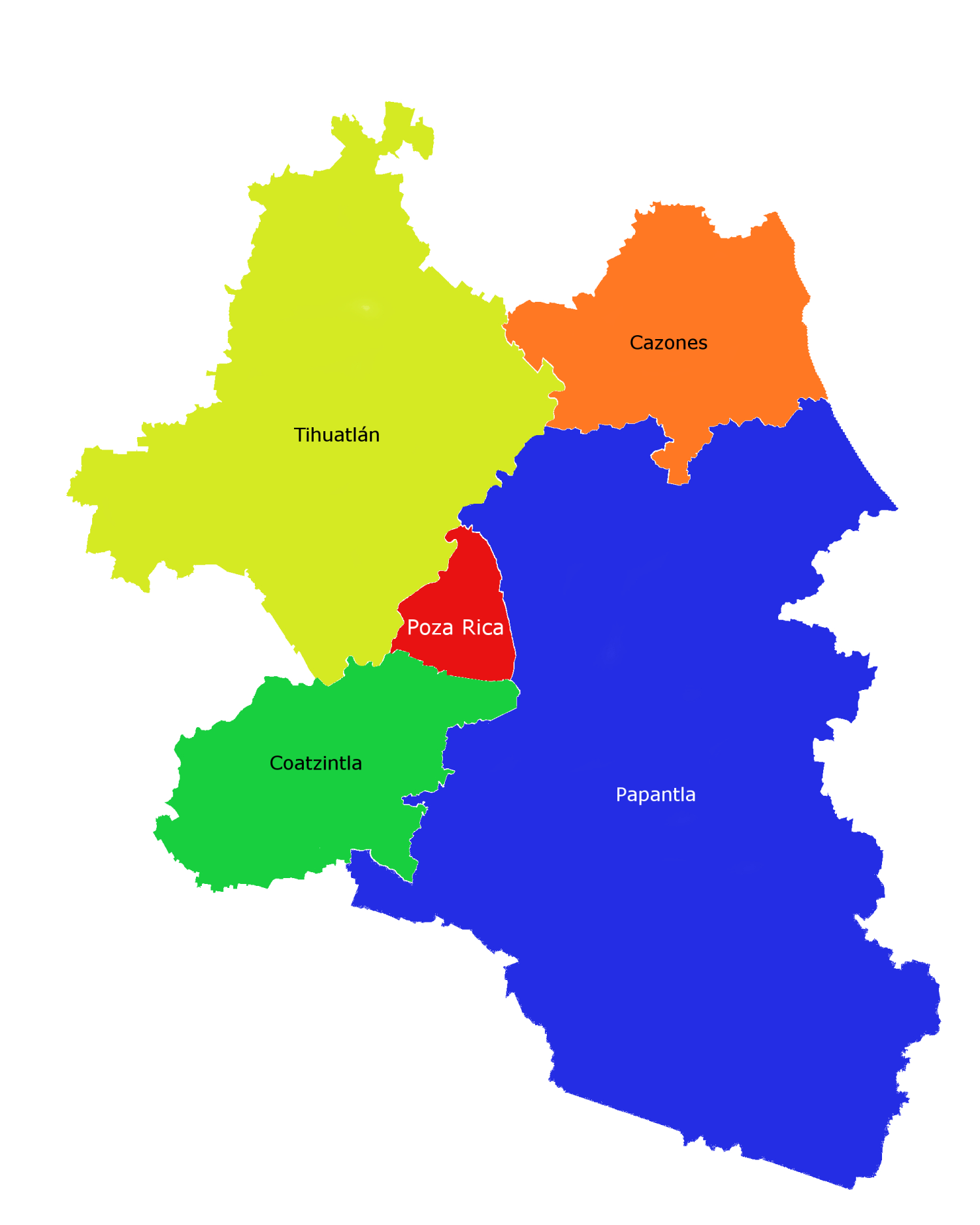
Map of Metropolitan Zone of the City.

The administrative boundaries of the municipality are determined by the municipality northeast of Papantla, south to the town of Coatzintla and to the northwest by the municipality of Tihuatlán, separated from the latter by the course of the river Cazones.

=== Geology and relief ===
The center of the city sits in a small valley on the basin river Cazones, in the coastal plain of the Gulf of Mexico, with an average altitude of 60 m, although most of the land sits on uneven ground and mostly hills northeast of the city, among which is the Cerro del Meson, with a maximum height of 242 meters. The predominant soils are of the vertisol type, with a high content of clay forming expansive cracks in dry seasons.

Since its inception, the rapid urban growth in extension exceeded the capacity of available flat land in the city, expanding the urban area to the northeast of the city, using increasingly uneven ground and hills bordering the town of Papantla, inhabiting the slopes of the hills that surround the city center.

=== Hydrography ===
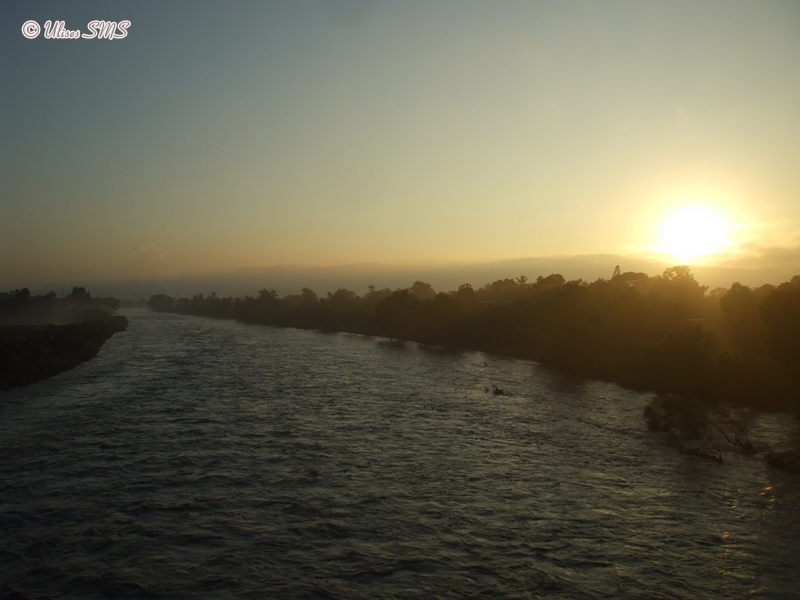
Cazones River Sunrise on the banks of the city of Poza Rica

The town of Poza Rica is located in the watershed of the river Cazones, this River 100 km long born in the mountainous region of Hidalgo and flows into the Gulf of Mexico, has a higher average annual runoff of 40 m^{3}/s in its mouth. The city is also surrounded by several Cazones River tributary streams such as the Mollejón, Hueleque, Salsipuedes and Arroyo Corn, which is regularly affected by flooding the annual rainy season.

Mexico's only nuclear power plant, Laguna Verde nuclear power plant, is about 200 kilometers (120 mi) away, near the state's capital city of Xalapa, Veracruz.

== Notable people ==
- Enrique Agüera, academic and politician.
- Cintia Angulo Leseigneur, entrepreneur.
- Sergio Basáñez, actor.
- Enrique Cabrera, plastic artist.
- Delia Casanova, actress.
- Jessica Aguilar, MMA fighter.
- Luis Hernández, footballer.
- Ovidio Hernández, musician.
