= Ellen S. Spinden =

American archaeologist

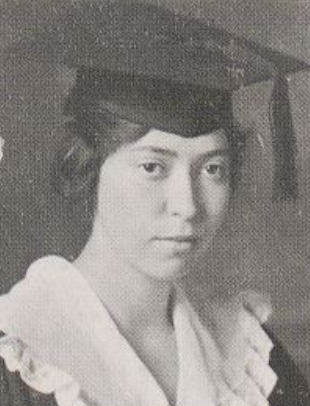
- Ellen S. Collier, later Spinden, from the 1919 yearbook of Radcliffe College
- Born: Ellen Sewall Collier; December 11, 1897; Cohasset, Massachusetts
- Died: March 27, 1985 (aged 87); Brooklyn, New York
- Occupation: Archaeologist
- Spouse: Herbert Spinden

Ellen Sewall Collier Spinden (December 11, 1897 – March 27, 1985) was an American archaeologist who studied Mayan culture in Mexico. She was married to anthropologist Herbert Spinden.

== Early life and education ==
Ellen Sewall Collier was born in Cohasset, Massachusetts, the daughter of George Washington Collier and Frances Parsons Osgood Collier. Her father owned a flour mill, and was director of the Boston Grain & Flour Exchange. She was named for her maternal grandmother, Ellen Devereux Sewall Osgood, and she inherited her grandmother's journal, which recorded the earlier Ellen's close friendship with Henry David Thoreau.

Collier attended Cohasset High School. She earned a bachelor's degree in 1919, and a master's degree in 1929, both at Radcliffe College.

== Career ==
After college, Collier worked with Katherine Rotan Drinker in the Harvard School of Public Health, and did translation work for Alfred Tozzer at the Peabody Museum. She worked with her husband at archaeological sites in Mexico and Nicaragua, especially at El Tajin, studying the Mayan civilization with funding from the Brooklyn Museum, the Peabody Museum, and the Buffalo Museum of Science. She is credited as "the first scholar to write at length on the imagery of El Tajín."

Spinden was one of the founding members of the Society for American Archaeology (SAA), and served on the executive council of the American Anthropological Association from 1930 to 1933. In 1936 she and Herbert Spinden lectured on pre-Conquest Mexico at the Eleventh Seminar in Mexico.

== Publications ==
- "The Place of Tajin in Totonac Archaeology" (1933)
- "An Excursion to Mexico" (1934, with Herbert J. Spinden)
- "Beyond the Puk" (1935)

== Personal life ==
Ellen Collier married anthropologist Herbert J. Spinden in 1928. They separated in 1938, and eventually divorced. He remarried in 1948, to Ailes Gilmour, a Japanese-American modern dancer. She died in 1985, in Brooklyn, New York, aged 87 years. Her grave is in Cohasset Central Cemetery.
