= Cohasset Central Cemetery =

Historic cemetery in Massachusetts, United States

- U.S. National Register of Historic Places
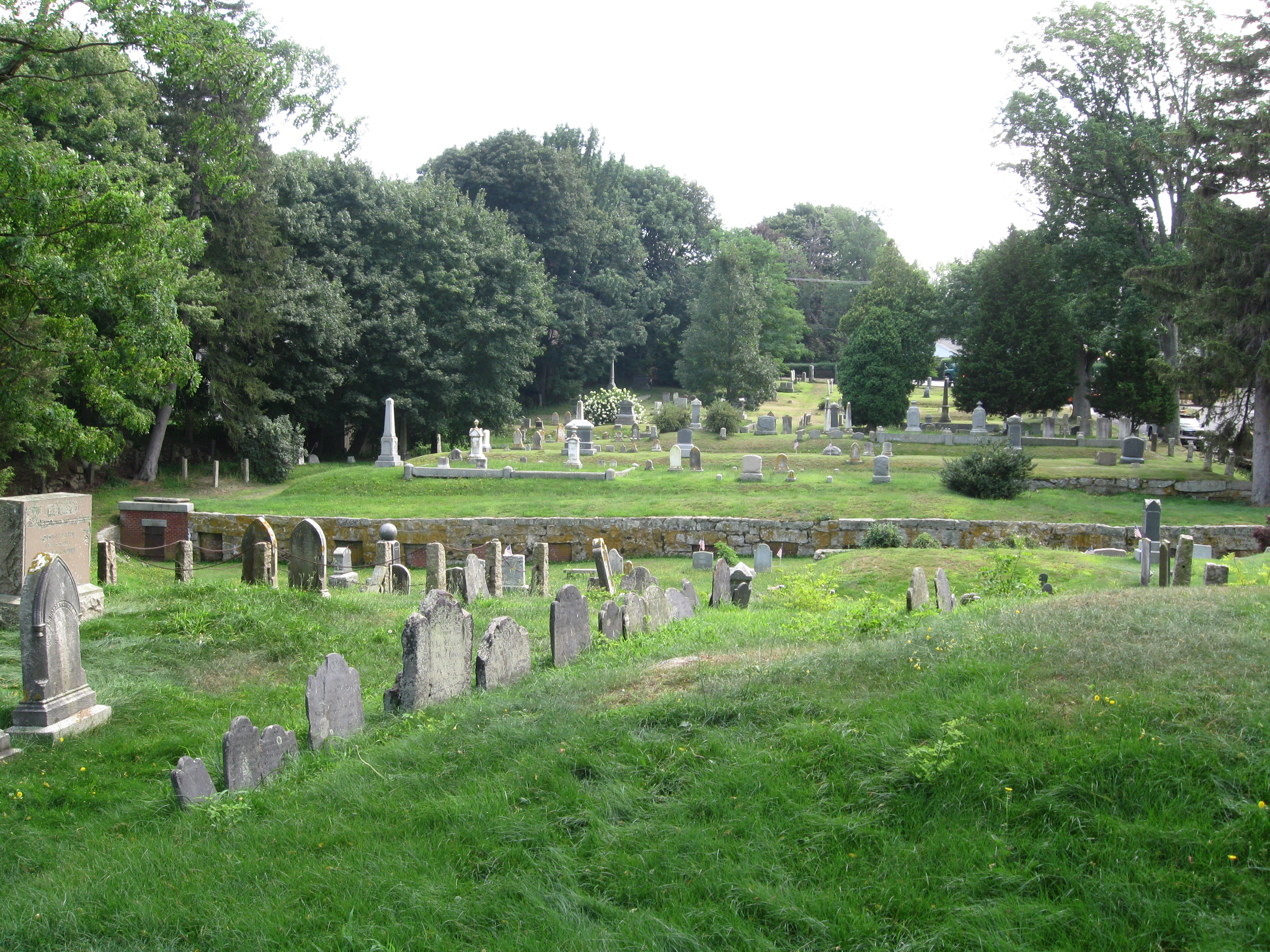

- Location within Massachusetts Location within the United States
- Location: Cohasset, Massachusetts
- Coordinates: 42°14′45″N 70°48′26″W
- NRHP reference No.: 02001612
- Added to NRHP: December 27, 2002

Cohasset Central Cemetery is a historic cemetery on North Main Street and Joy Place in Cohasset, Massachusetts.

The first burial was that of Margaret Tower in 1705. However, the gravestone's design suggests it was carved in the 1740s, along with that of her husband, Cohasset's first settler, Ibrook Tower. The oldest gravestone is believed to be that of Sarah Pratt (d. 1706). Other notable graves include that of Levi B. Gaylord (1840–1900), the town's only recipient of the Medal of Honor, Civil War general Zealous Bates Tower (1819–1900), and the Celtic Cross erected in 1914 on the gravesite of about 45 of 99 Irish immigrants lost in an 1849 shipwreck off Cohasset.

The cemetery was added to the National Register of Historic Places in 2002.

== See also ==
- National Register of Historic Places listings in Norfolk County, Massachusetts
