= El Tajín =

Archaeological site in Mexico

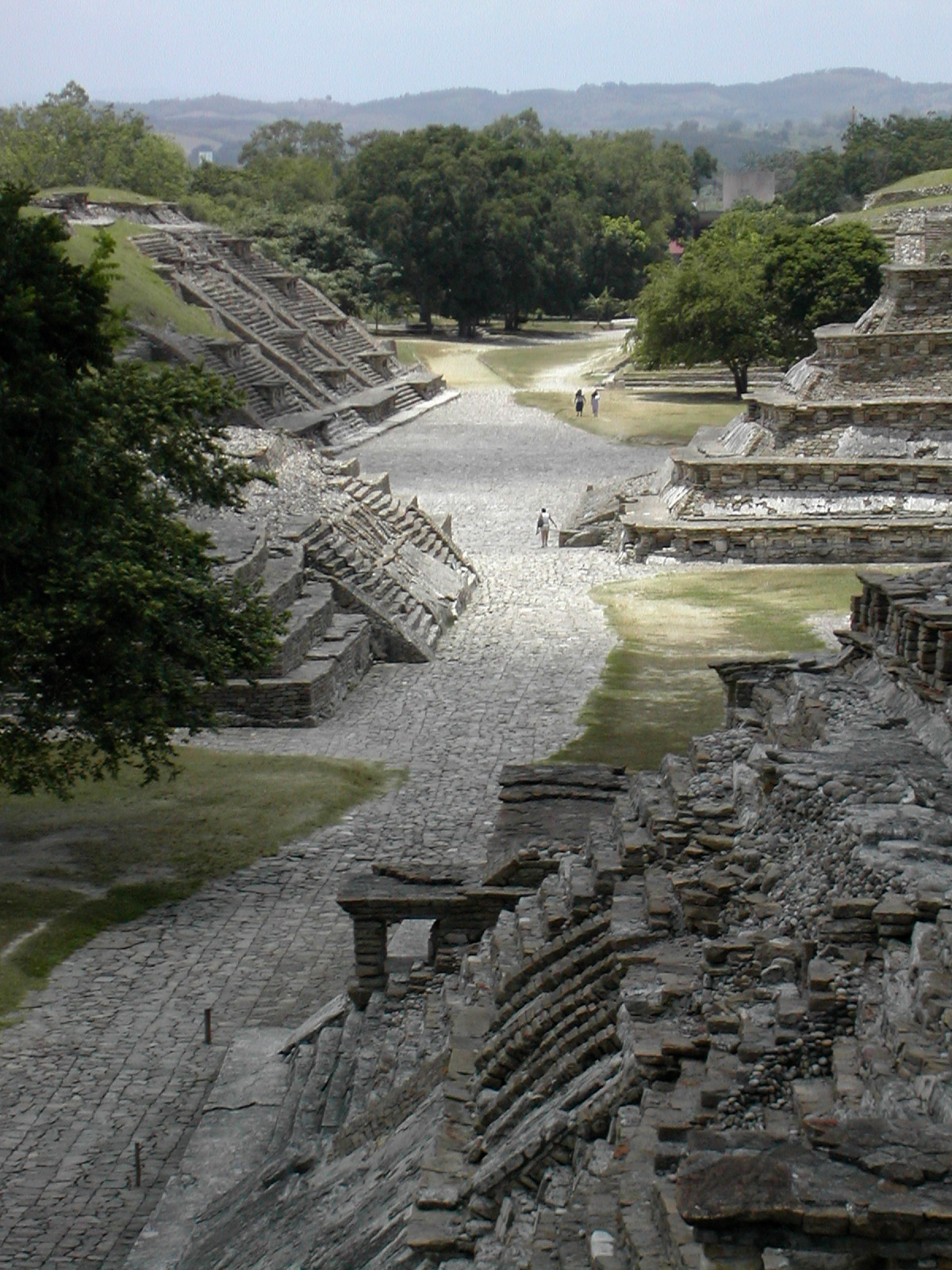
- Ceremonial center in Papantla, Veracruz

- Location within Mesoamerica
- 20°26′53.01″N 97°22′41.67″W
- Periods: Early Classic to Late Postclassic
- Cultures: Classic Veracruz
- Location: Veracruz, Mexico
- Region: Veracruz

UNESCO World Heritage Site
- Official name: El Tajin, Pre-Hispanic City
- Criteria: Cultural: iii, iv
- Reference: 631
- Inscription: 1992 (16th Session)
- Area: 240 ha (590 acres)

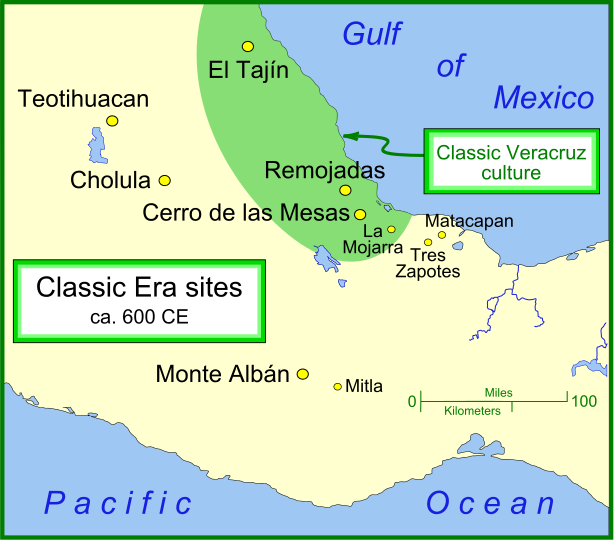
El Tajín in the context of other Classic era sites

El Tajín is a pre-Columbian archeological site in the Mexican state of Veracruz and is one of the largest and most important cities of the Classic era of Mesoamerica. A part of the Classic Veracruz culture, El Tajín flourished from 600 to 1200 AD and during this time numerous temples, palaces, ballcourts, and pyramids were built. No European seemed to have known of its existence until 1785, when a government inspector chanced upon the Pyramid of the Niches.

El Tajín, named after the Totonac rain god, was named a World Heritage site in 1992, due to its cultural importance and its architecture. This architecture includes the use of decorative niches and cement in forms unknown in the rest of Mesoamerica. Its best-known monument is the Pyramid of the Niches, but other important monuments include the Arroyo Group, the North and South Ballcourts and the palaces of Tajín Chico. In total there have been 20 ballcourts discovered at this site, (the last 3 being discovered in March 2013). Since the 1970s, El Tajin has been the most important archeological site in Veracruz for tourists, attracting 386,406 visitors in 2017.

It is also the site of the annual Cumbre Tajin Festival, which occurs each March featuring indigenous and foreign cultural events as well as concerts by popular musicians.

== Location ==
The site is located in Mexico in the highlands of the municipality of Papantla in modern-day Veracruz, not far from the city of Poza Rica, which lies northwest of the port and city of Veracruz. The city is set in the low rolling mountains that lead from the Sierra Madre Oriental to the Gulf coast near the Tecolutla River. In ancient times, this city was located in the northeast corner of what is called Mesoamerica, and controlled an area from between the Cazones and Tecolutla Rivers to the modern state of Puebla. The main city is defined by two streams which merge to form the Tlahuanapa Arroyo, a tributary of the Tecolutla River. These two streams provided the population's potable water. Most of the buildings are at the southern end, where the land is relatively flat and the two streams converge. The site extends to the northwest where terraces were constructed to place more buildings, mostly for the city's elite. However the city also had communities located on the hills east and west of the main city, with mostly lower-class dwellings. The total site extends for 1,056 hectares (4.08 sq mi).

The area is rainforest, with a hot wet climate of the Senegal type. Average temperature for the year is 35 °C with hurricanes possible from June to October. It is also affected by a weather phenomenon called "nortes." These are cold fronts with winds that come from the north and down the Tamaulipas and Veracruz coasts. The site has no major settlements located next to it. Surrounding it are tobacco fields, banana plantations, apiaries and vanilla groves. The closest settlement of any real size is Papantla.

== Name ==
When it was rediscovered by officialdom in 1785, the site was known to the local Totonac, whose ancestors may also have built the city, as El Tajín, which was said to mean "of thunder or lightning bolt". Related to this is their belief that twelve old thunderstorm deities, known as Tajín, still inhabit the ruins. However, a series of indigenous maps dating from the time of the Spanish conquest, found in nearby Tihuatlan and now known as the Lienzos de Tuxpan, suggest that the city might then have been called "Mictlan" or "place of the dead", a common denomination for ancient sites whose original names have been lost. This name also appears in the Matricula de Tributos, a surviving Aztec tribute record, which later formed part of the Codex Mendoza. This may therefore be linked to another Totonac meaning claimed for El Tajín: "place of the invisible beings or spirits".

== History of the city ==
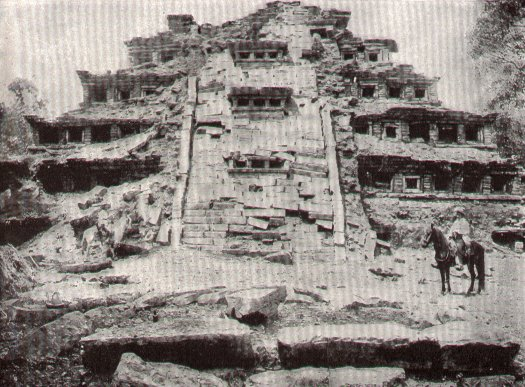
Pyramid of the Niches before restoration (1913 photo). The present-day view of the pyramid can be seen here.

Chronology studies at Tajín and nearby sites show that the area has been occupied at least since 5600 BCE and show how nomadic hunters and gatherers eventually became sedentary farmers, building more complex societies prior to the rise of the city of El Tajin. The pace of this societal progression became more rapid with the rise of the neighboring Olmec civilization around 1150 BCE, although the Olmecs were never here in great numbers. It is unclear who built the city. Some argue in favor of the Totonacs and the Xapaneca; however, there is a significant amount of evidence that the area was populated by the Huastec at the time the settlement was founded in the 1st century CE Monumental construction started soon after and by 600 CE, El Tajín was a city. The rapid rise of Tajin was due to its strategic position along the old Mesoamerican trade routes. It controlled the flow of commodities, both exports such as vanilla and imports from other locations in what is now Mexico and Central America. From the early centuries, objects from Teotihuacan are abundant.

From 600 to 1200 CE, El Tajín was a prosperous city that eventually controlled much of what is now the modern state of Veracruz. The city-state was highly centralized, with the city itself having more than fifty ethnicities living there. Most of the population lived in the hills surrounding the main city, and the city obtained most of its foodstuffs from the Tecolutla, Nautla and Cazones areas. These fields not only produced staples such as corn and beans but luxury items such as cacao. One of the panels at the Pyramid of the Niches shows a ceremony being held at a cacao tree. The religion was based on the movements of the planets, the stars and the Sun and Moon, with the Mesoamerican ballgame and pulque having extremely important parts. This led to the building of many pyramids with temples and seventeen ballcourts, more than any other Mesoamerican site. The city began to have extensive influence starting around this time, which can be best seen at the neighboring site of Yohualichan, whose buildings show the kinds of niches that define El Tajin. Evidence of the city's influence can be seen along the Veracruz Gulf coast to the Maya region and into the high plateau of central Mexico.

At the end of the Classic period, El Tajín survived the widespread social collapse, migrations and destruction that forced the abandonment of many population centers at the end of this period. El Tajín reached its peak after the fall of Teotihuacan, and conserved many cultural traits inherited from that civilization. It reached its apogee in the Epi-Classic (900-1100 CE) before suffering destruction and the encroachment of the jungle.

El Tajín prospered until the early years of the 13th century, when it was destroyed by fire, presumably started by an invading force believed to be the Chichimecs. The Totonacs established the nearby settlement of Papantla after the fall of El Tajín. El Tajín was left to the jungle and remained covered and silent for over 500 years. While the city had been completely covered by jungle from its demise until the 19th century, it is unlikely that knowledge of the place was completely lost to the native peoples. Archeological evidence shows that a village existed here at the time the Spanish arrived and the area has always been considered sacred by the Totonacs. However, there are no records by any Europeans about the place prior to the late 18th century.

== History of its rediscovery ==
In 1785, an official by the name of Diego Ruiz stumbled upon the Pyramid of the Niches, whilst looking for clandestine tobacco plantings breaching the royal monopoly in this isolated area rarely visited by the authorities. He made a drawing of the pyramid and reported his find to a publication called Gaceta de Mexico. He claimed the natives had kept the place secret. The publication of the pyramid's existence in the Gaceta influenced academic circles in New Spain and Europe, attracting the attention of antiquarians José Antonio de Alzate y Ramírez and Ciriaco Gonazlez Carvajal, who wrote about it. It also gained the interest of several academics, who compared the pyramid with the constructions of ancient Rome. The pyramid was further advertised by Italian Pietro Márquez in Europe and by Alexander von Humboldt.

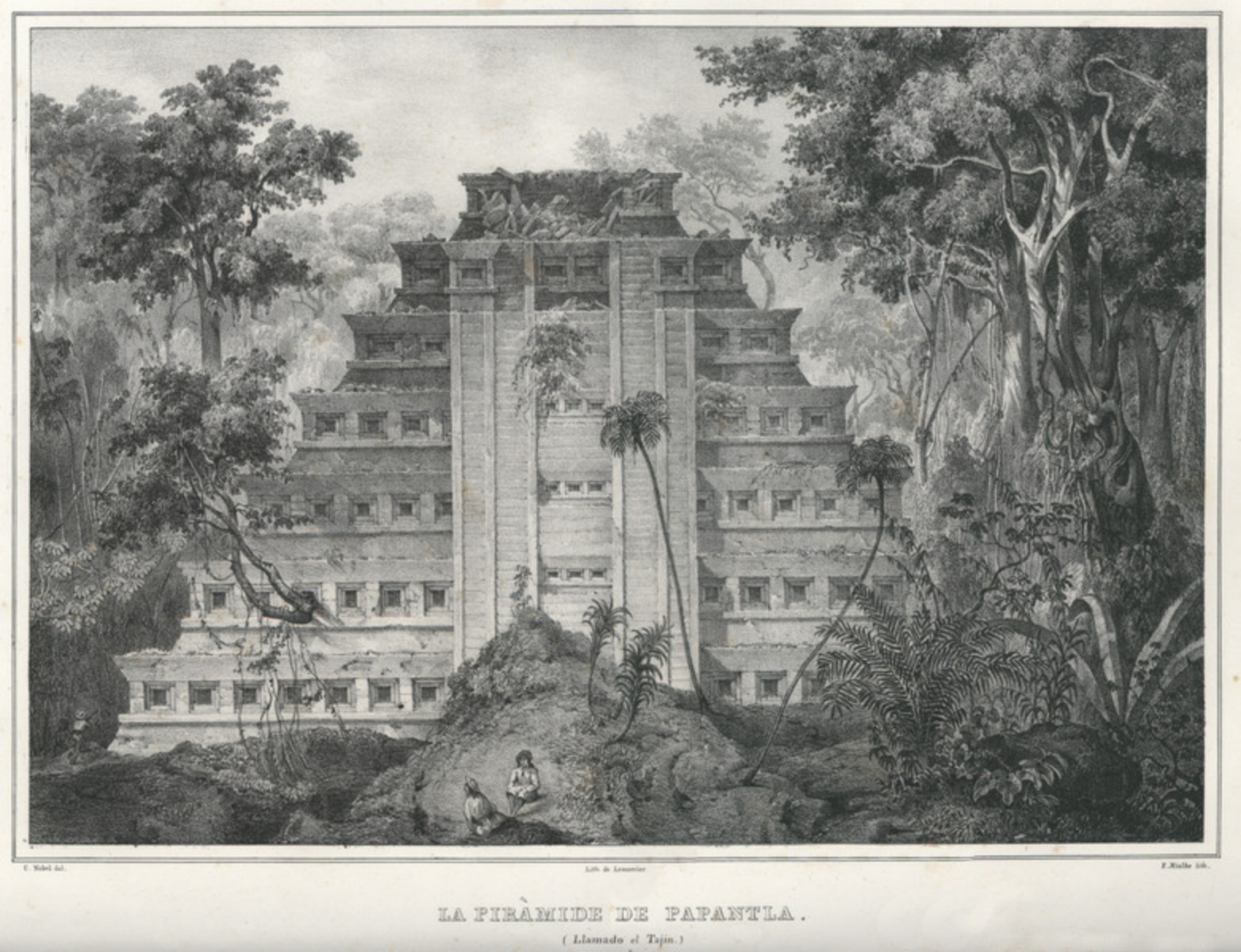
One of Carl Nebel's drawings of the Pyramid of the Niches

Since its discovery by Europeans, the site has attracted visitors for two centuries. German architect Charles Nebel visited the site in 1831 and was the first to graphically and narratively detail the Pyramid of the Niches as well as the nearby ruins of Mapilca and Tuzapan. He was also the first to speculate that the pyramid was part of a larger city. His drawings and descriptions were published in a book named Voyage pittoresque et archéologique published in Paris in 1836.

The first archeologists reached the site in the early 20th century and included Teobert Maler, Edward Seler, Francisco del Paso y Troncoso and Herbert and Ellen Spinden. With the discovery of oil in the area came roads that were built and improved from the 1920s to the 1940s. This allowed for more intensive investigation of the area. In 1935–1938, the first formal mapping, clearing and exploration was done by Agustin Garcia Vega. The first building to be completely cleared of jungle growth was the Pyramid of the Niches. He eventually cleared 77 acres (310,000 m^{2}), uncovering more buildings and proposed that it be called "The Archeological City of El Tajín." Starting from 1938, excavation and reconstruction work was sponsored by INAH and headed by Jose Garcia Payon, uncovering platforms, ballcourts and part of Tajín Chico with its palaces. He continued to explore the site for 39 years until his death in 1977 despite the challenges of working in the jungle and the lack of funds. By this time, he had uncovered most of the major buildings and established that Tajín was one of the most important cities of ancient Mexico. By the 1970s, the site was one of the few in Veracruz that attracted significant numbers of tourists. From 1984 to 1994, Jürgen K. Brüggemann built on the work of García Payón, uncovering 35 more buildings. It is believed that only half of El Tajin archeological site has been uncovered.

== World Heritage Site ==
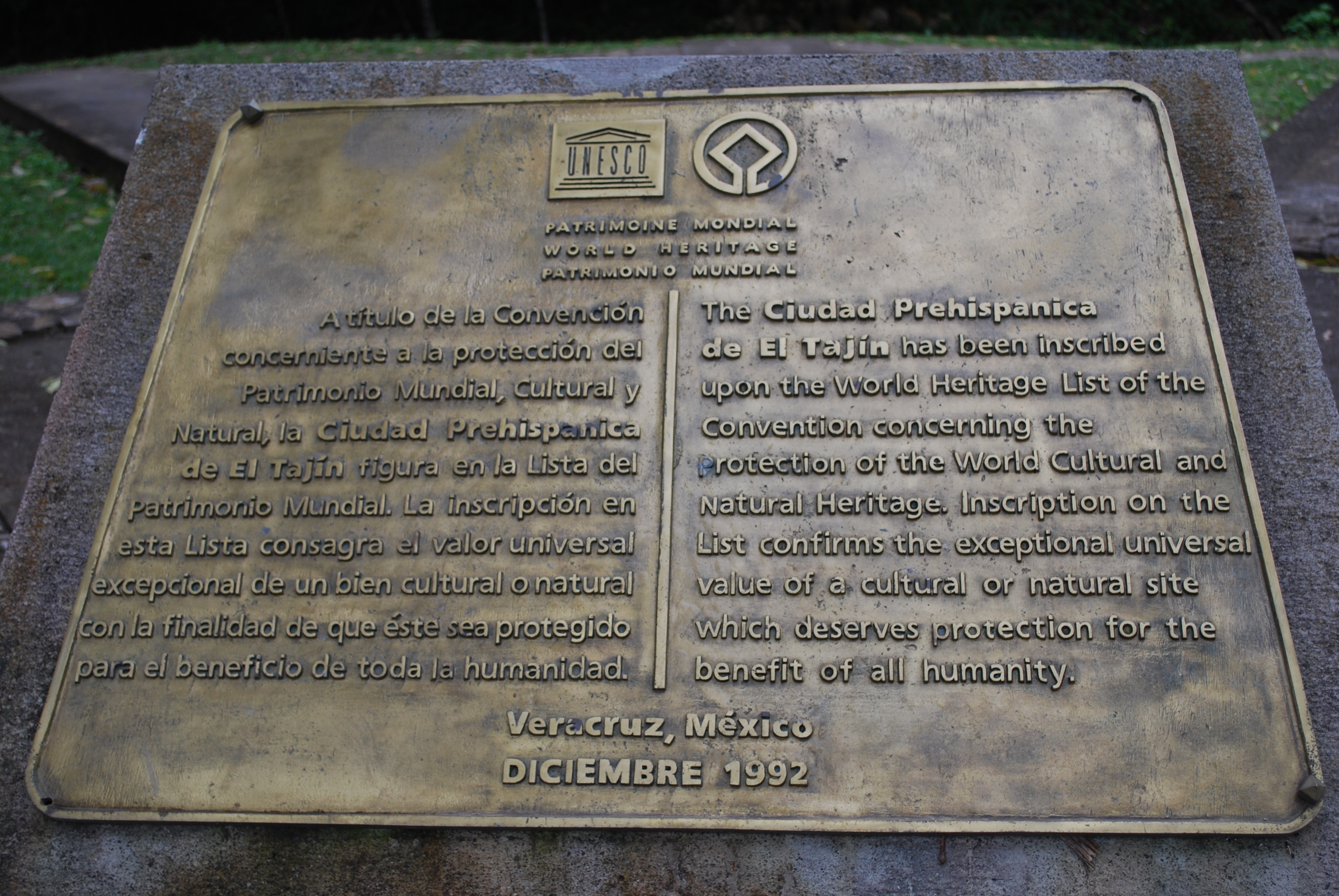
World Heritage Site plaque

El Tajín was inscribed as a World Heritage Site in 1992, because of its historical significance and architecture and engineering. "Its architecture, which is unique in Mesoamerica, is characterized by elaborate carved reliefs on the columns and frieze. The 'Pyramid of the Niches', a masterpiece of ancient Mexican and American architecture, reveals the astronomical and symbolic significance of the buildings." The site is one of the most important in Mexico and the most important in the state of Veracruz.

Its significance is due to its size and unique forms of art and architecture. The borders of the city's residential areas have not yet been defined but is the entire site is estimated at 2,640 acres (10.7 km^{2}). To date, only about fifty percent of the city's buildings has been excavated, revealing a series of plazas, palaces, and administrative buildings within a two-square-mile area. Unlike the highly rigid grid patterns of ancient cities in the central highlands of Mexico, the builders of El Tajin designed and aligned buildings as individual units. There are several architectural features here which are unique to the place or seen in only rarely in Mesoamerica. Adornment in the form of niches and stepped frets are omnipresent, decorating even utilitarian buttresses and platform walls. Stepped frets are seen in other parts of Mesoamerica but rarely to this extent. The use of niches is unique to El Tajin.

One notable aspect of the construction at El Tajin is the use of poured cement in forms. Surviving roof fragments from Building C in the Tajín Chico section is an example of cement roof constructions. Due to the lack of beams or other materials to prop it up, this roof had to be very thick to support itself. To lighten the load and to bind the layers of cement, pumice stones and pottery shards were mixed into the cement. The cement could not be poured all at once but rather in successive layers. It has been suggested that the buildings were filled with earth to support the roof as it was being poured and dried. The finished roofs were nearly a meter thick and almost perfectly flat. While this kind of cement roof is common in modern times, it was unique in the Mesoamerican world. Impressions of baskets, tamale wrappers and other items have been found in the dried cement. The poured cement was used in the only building with two floors at the site, Building B, as a roof and as a separator between the ground and upper floor. The only other known example of two story construction is in the Mayan territories. Another feature shared only with the Mayans is the use of a light blue paint. (wikerson45) Another feature unique to El Tajin is that a number of the residences have windows placed to allow cool breezes to enter on hot days.

While ballcourts are common in Mesoamerica, El Tajin distinguishes itself by having seventeen. Two of these ballcourts contain sculpted panels which depict the ball game and its ritual significance. The most impressive of these panels are on the South Ballcourt which contain images of underworld deities and a ballplayer being decapitated in order to approach the gods and ask for pulque for his people.

Since becoming a World Heritage Site, research and conservation efforts have been made to promote knowledge of and protect the site. There have been a number of research projects as well as reconstruction projects and projects to make more of the site accessible to visitors. However, the director states that more needs to be done to conserve the site, especially its fragile murals, and to balance the needs of tourists against the need to conserve the site in general. Each year since 1992, the number of visitors to the site increases which now stands at 653,000 annually.

Air pollution from oil-drilling platforms and power stations along the coast causes high levels of acid rain in the region, which is eroding the intricately carved reliefs on the soft limestone buildings "at an alarming rate", according to Humberto Bravo of the University of Mexico's Center for Atmospheric Sciences in 2007.

== Major monuments ==
=== The entrance and site museum ===
The entrance to the site is located at the south end. In being named a World Heritage Site in 1992, new facilities have been added to this area, such as a cafeteria, information services, a park and administrative offices. The site museum is also located here. In addition, the Danza de los Voladores is enacted at the entrance to the site and is considered a requirement for visitors. The voladores appear every half-hour at the pole and circle erected just outside the main gate.

The park is named Parque Takilhsukut and is located about one km outside the site proper. It is a modern facility with the aim of being a center of Veracruz indigenous identity. It covers 17 hectares with a capacity of 40,000 people. It hosts fairs, conventions and other events, including part of the annual Cumbre Tajín cultural festival which is held in March. There are also facilities for workshops, exhibitions, alternative therapies, seminars and ceremonies.

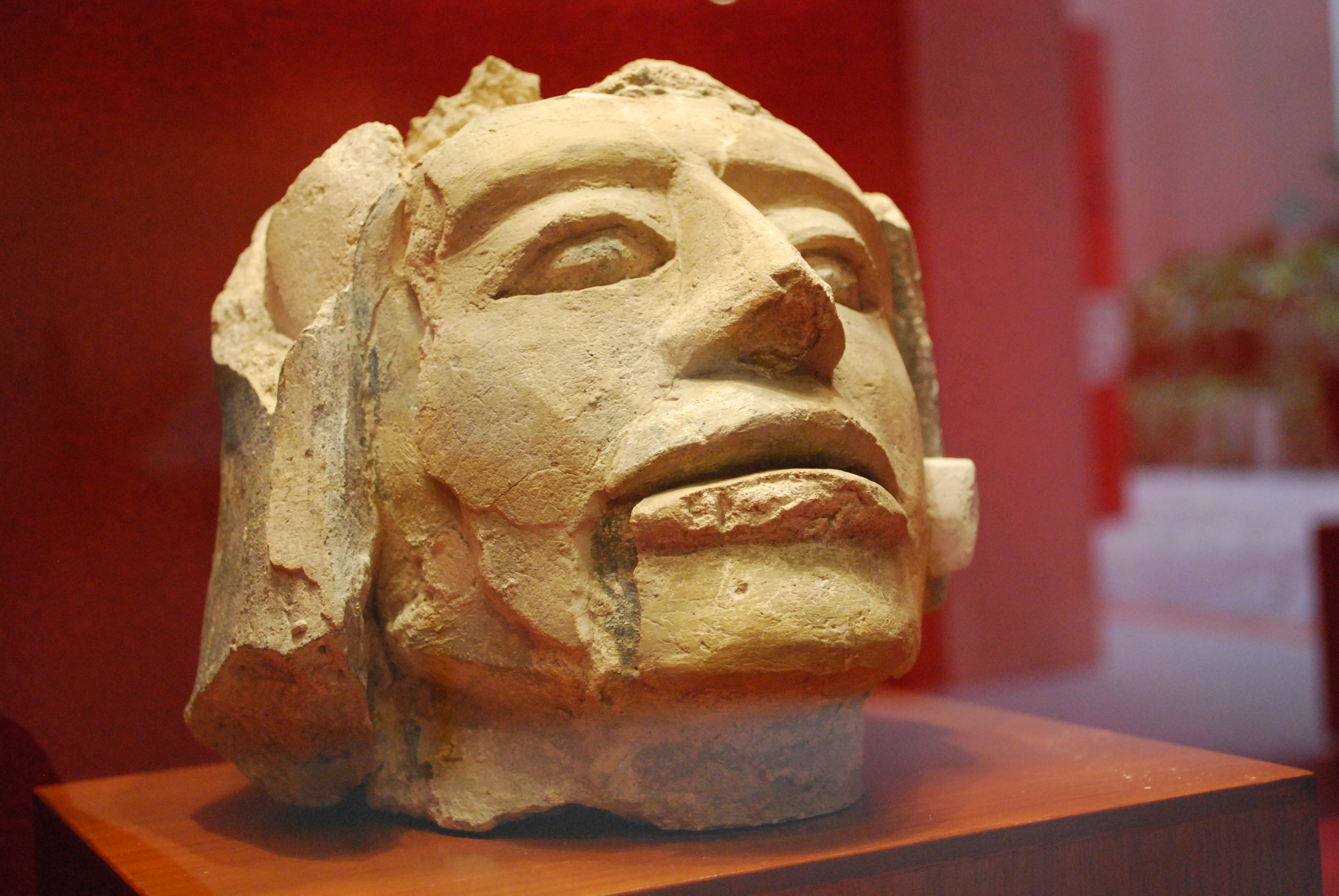
Sculpture on display at the site museum

The site museum is divided into two parts: an enclosed building and a roofed area covering large stone sculpture fragments. The enclosed room is for smaller objects that have been found during the years the site has been explored, most coming from the Pyramid of the Niches. One of the most interesting objects on display is an altar from Building 4. It is a large stone slab sculpted to depict four individuals standing in pairs with a figure of intertwined snakes between the two pairs. The snakes represent the ball game marker called the tlaxmalacatle in Aztec times. The main exhibits of the roofed area are the fragments recovered from the Building of the Columns, with a number partially reassembled. One tells the story of 13 Rabbit, a ruler of El Tajin who probably had the building constructed. The scene shows as dual procession with 13 Rabbit seated on a wooden throne and his feet on a severed head. In front is a sacrifice victim with his entrails slung over a frame. 13 Rabbit's name glyph appears above as well as an attendant named 4 Axe. The rest of the procession consists of warriors holding captives by their hair.

=== Arroyo Group ===
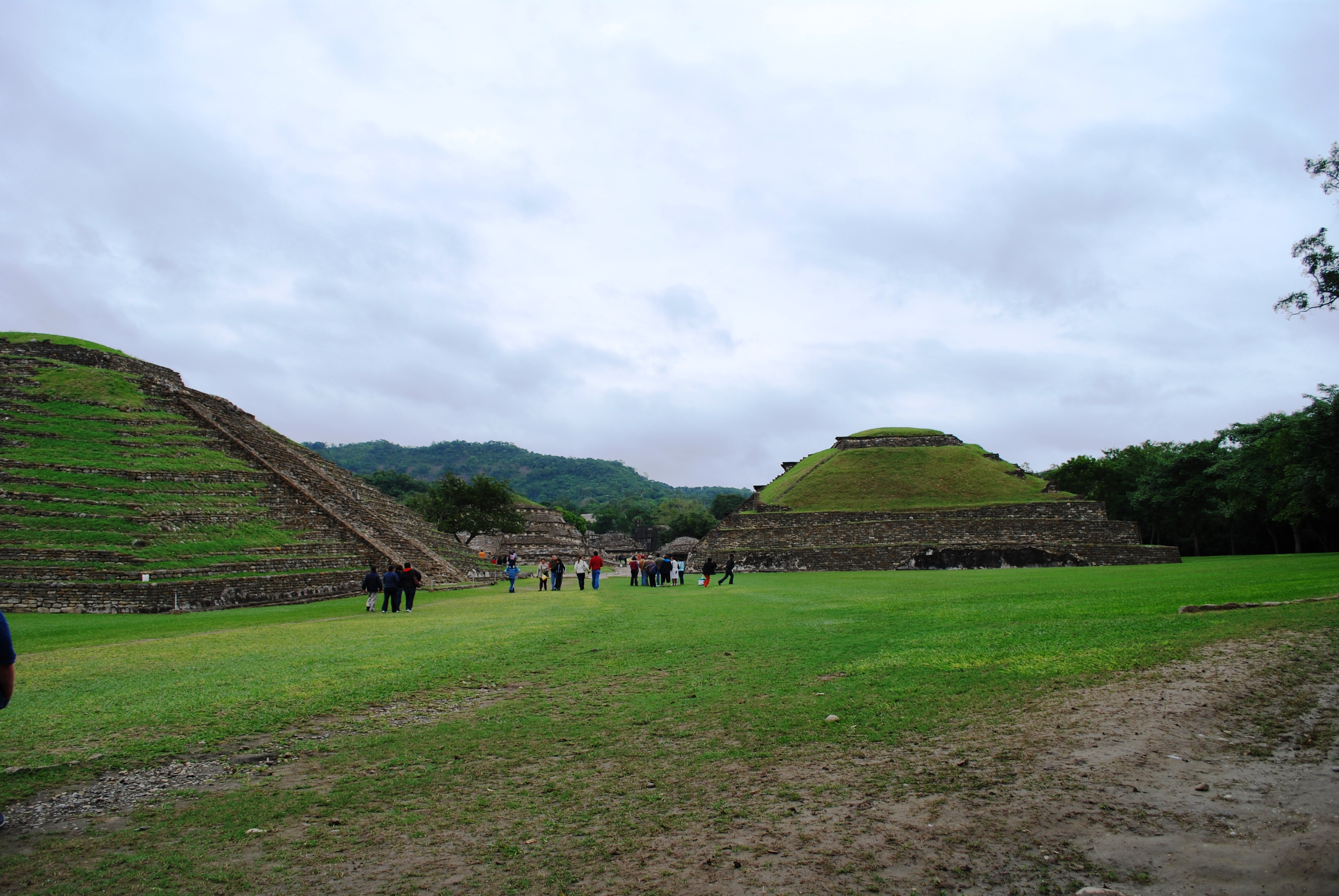
Approaching Arroyo Group from south east

This is called the Arroyo Group because two streams surround it on three sides. This area is one of the oldest sections of the city, and is more than 86,100 square feet (8,000 m^{2}). It is flanked by four high buildings, named Buildings 16, 18, 19 and 20, which were topped by temples. Stairways lead from the plaza floor to the temples above. Unlike the rest of the city, these four buildings are uniform in height and nearly symmetrical. The pyramids here are primitive in comparison to the rest of the site, with niches that are not as finely formed. The east and west pyramids of the arroyo group each held three temples at the top. Another unusual feature is that this plaza has no smaller structures such as buildings or altars to break up the space. It has been determined that this was the city marketplace because of the large plaza space for stalls and for a deity found here that is related to commerce. The merchant deity found here has features more in common with this kind of deity in the central highlands of Mexico than of Tajín. The market that filled this plaza consisted of stalls made with sticks and cloth offering regional products such as vanilla as well as products from other parts of Mesoamerica such as jaguar skins, exotic birds such as the parrot and the macaw and quetzal feathers. Slaves for service and sacrifice were also sold here. West of the building on the south side is a large ball court with sloped sides and sculpted friezes depicting the god Quetzalcoatl. When the city fell, most of the sculptures in this area were smashed or defaced with some being reused as building stone.

=== The Pyramid of the Niches ===
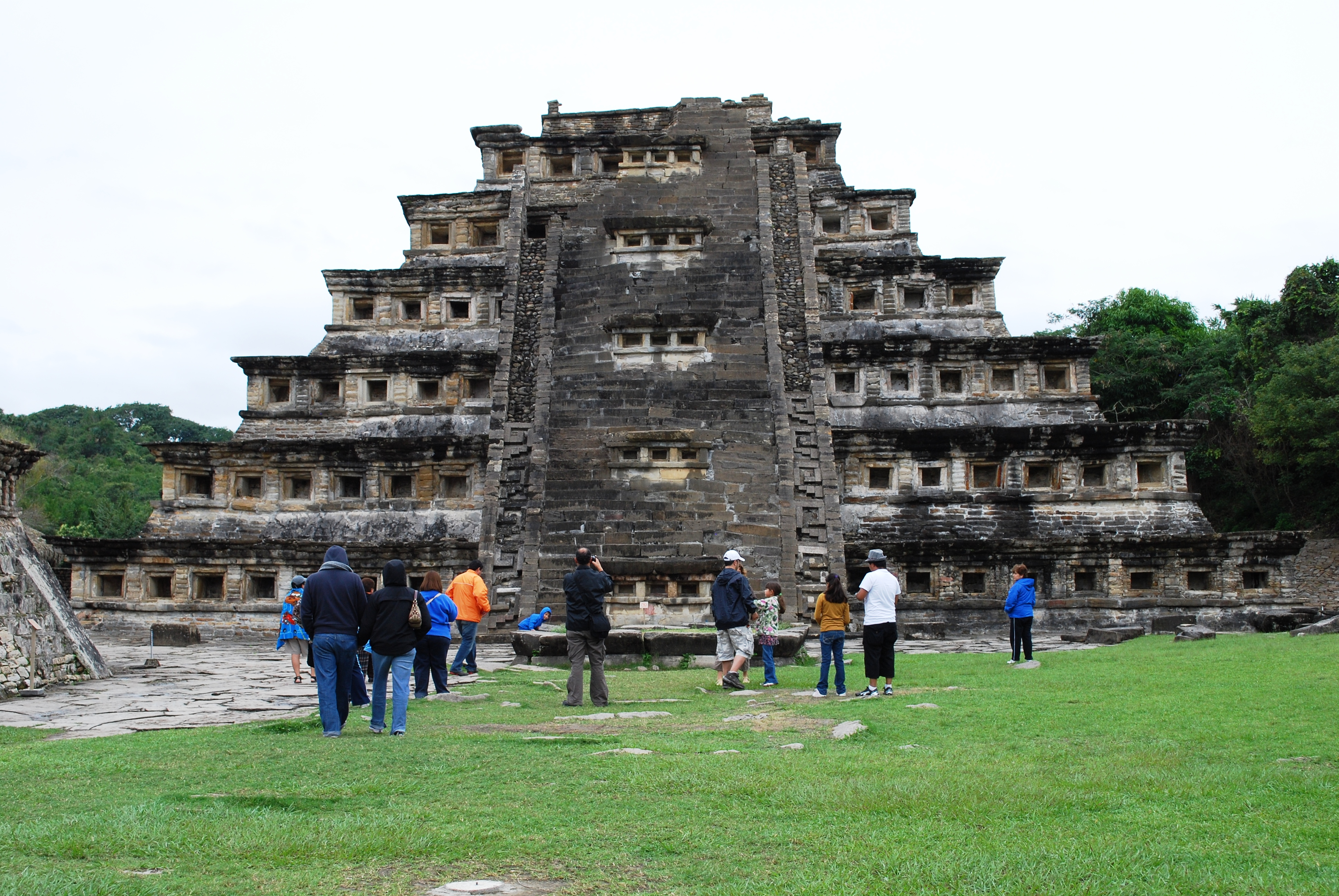
The Pyramid of the Niches

This pyramid has a number of names, including El Tajín, Pyramid of Papantla, Pyramid of the Seven Stories and the Temple of the Niches. It has become the focus of the site because of its unusual design and good state of preservation. It was prominent in ancient times as well. A large quantity of sculpture was recovered from this pyramid. The pyramid is square-based (35 meters on each side) and is constructed of seven graded levels. The building is mostly constructed of carefully cut and crafted flagstones, the largest of which is estimated to be about eight metric tons in weight. The stones, especially around the niches are fitted together as to need a minimum amount of lime and earth mortar. The structure originally was covered in stucco which served as the base for paint.

The pyramid has seven stories. Each of these consists of a sloping base wall called a talud and a vertical wall called a tablero, which was fairly common in Mesoamerica. What is unusual about this construction and others in the city are the addition of decorative niches with the top capped by what Jose Garcia Payon called a "flying cornice", a triangular overhang. The stones are arranged in controlled lines and delicate proportions. Originally the structure was painted a dark red with the niches in black intended to deepen the shadows of the recessed niches. Niches are also found underneath the stairway along the east face, which indicates that the stairway was a later addition. The niches on the original structure, not counting those on the later stairway, total 365, the solar year. At the top of the pyramid there were tablets framed by grotesque serpent-dragons.

The ritual function of the building is not primarily calendaric. The deep niches imitate caves, which long have been considered to be passageways to the underworld, where many of the gods reside. Caves, especially those with springs, have been considered sacred in much of Mexico with offerings of flowers and candles being traditional. As late as the mid 20th century, remains of beeswax candles could still be found left on the first level of this pyramid. There is a popular belief that each niche contained an idol or effigy but archeological work here has ruled this out. The most important part of the structure was the temple that was on top of this pyramid; however, this was completely destroyed and little is known about what it might have looked like.

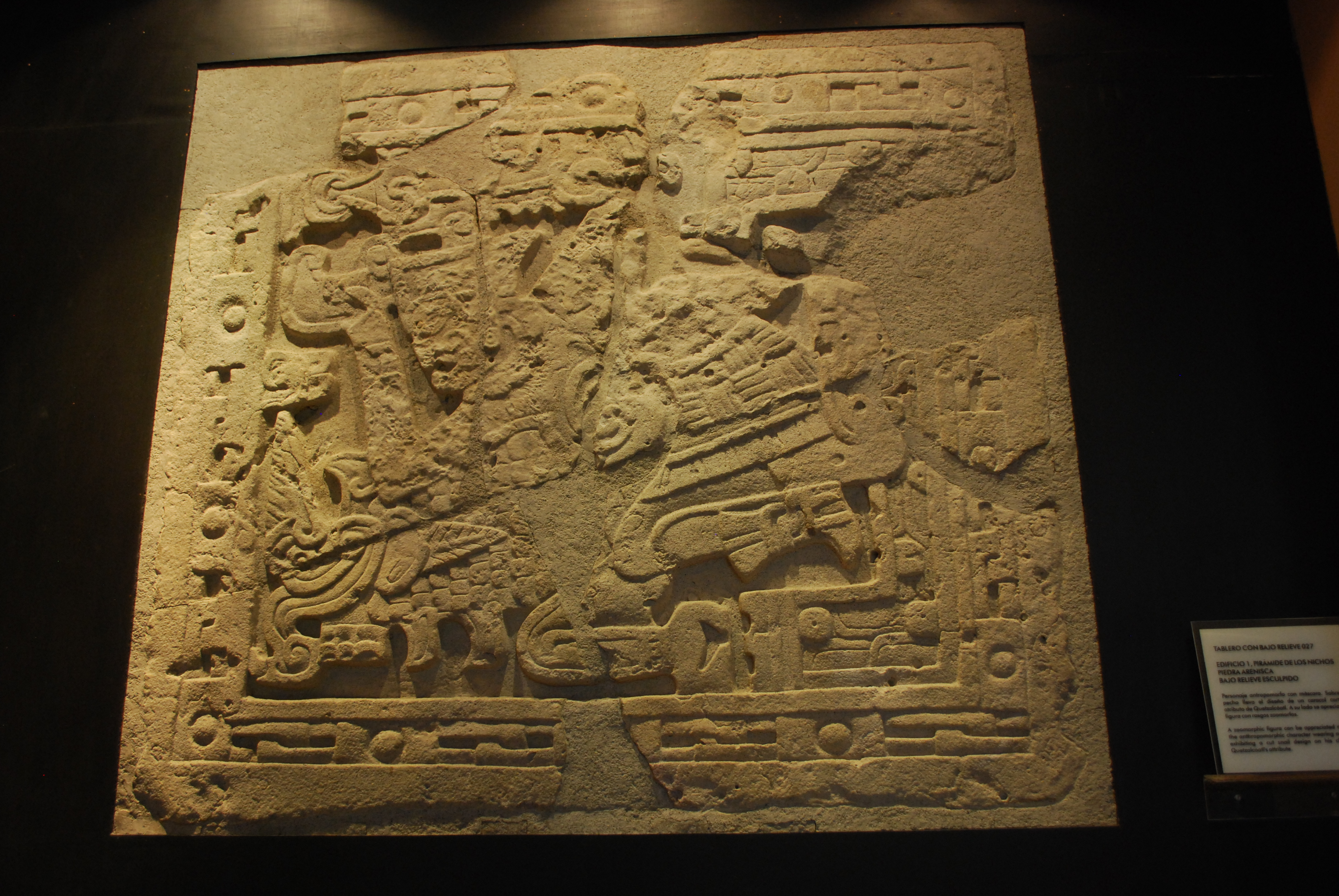
Tablet 27 from the Pyramid of the Niches

Sculpture from the temple is largely fragmentary. The larger tablets have depictions of the rain god, or a ruler dressed as the deity, involved in several ritual or mythological scenes. This seems to have been the most important god of the culture as other depictions are found in other places at the site. His appearance here underlies the significance of this pyramid. The stairway to the temple is adorned on the sides with frets, which are called xicalcoliuhqui. It is thought to symbolize lightning and while it is common in Mesoamerica, it is a very prominent motif here. These frets were probably painted blue as they were on other buildings, where remains of paint have been found. At the top of the stairway were probably two large three-dimensional stelae. One has survived mostly intact and is now in the site museum. Off the stairs and leading east from the pyramid are large round stone with holes in the middle, in which were probably placed banners. The interior of the pyramid is rocks and earth. This fill is strained between the sloping walls which become the taluds of each level of the pyramid. Buried under all of this is a smaller stricter with taluds but no niches.

The pyramid is flanked by two smaller structures named Building 2 and Building 4. Both are small temple-like platforms. Building 4 contains a smaller, older structure inside it that may be among the earliest structures at the site.

=== Tajin Chico ===
Tajin Chico is a multilevel portion of the site that stretches north-northwest from the older parts of the city up a hill. Much of this section was created by using massive amounts of landfill. It is an immense acropolis composed of numerous palaces and other civil structures. There are relatively few temples here. It is also more easily defended than other parts of the city. Tajin Chico is so named because it was initially thought to be a separate but related site. It is now known that it belonged to the center of the city. However, as the term was already in the literature about the site, it has stuck.

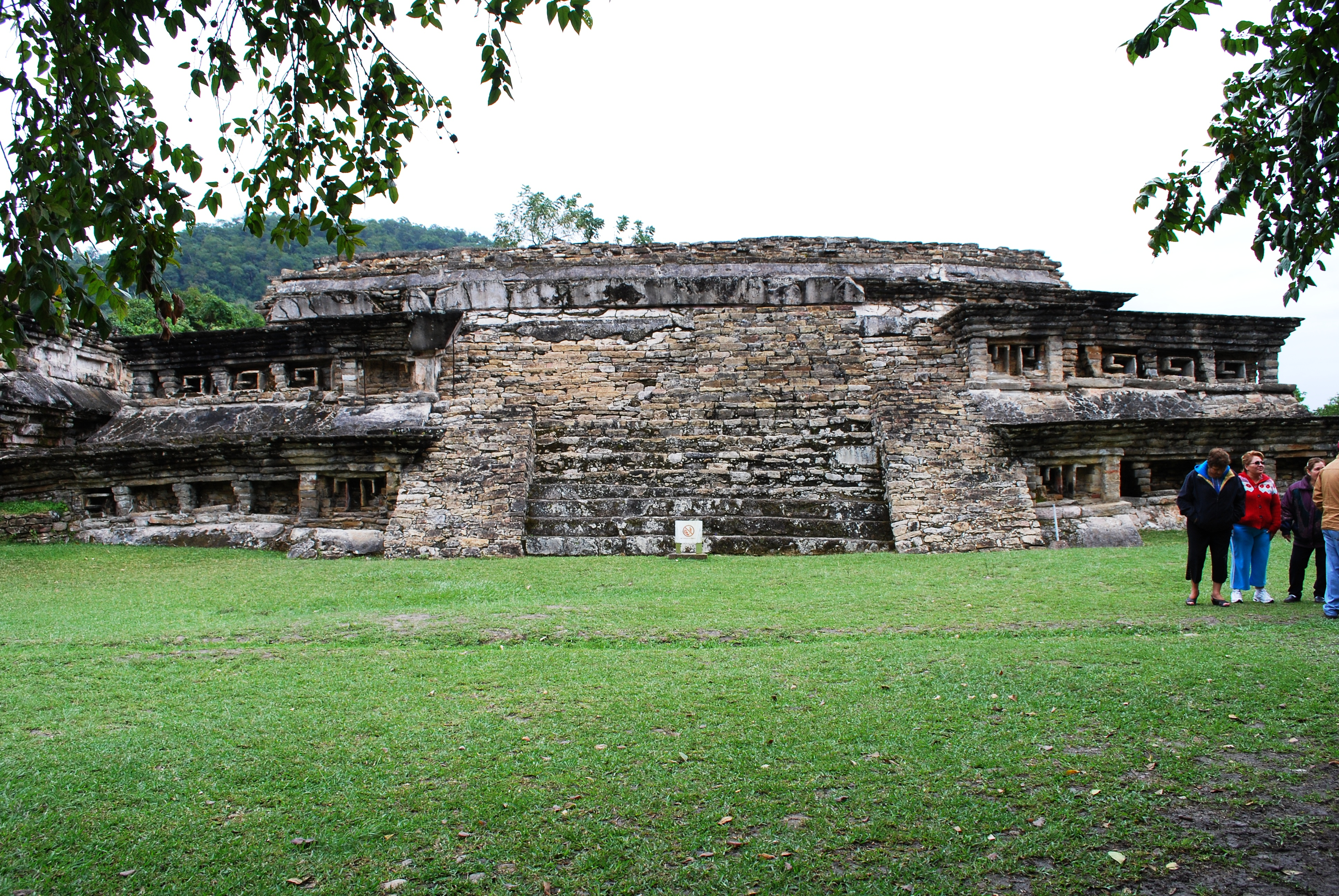
Building C

Building C was not a temple but its function is not entirely clear. Nearby buildings A and B were palaces. It is probably that this building was used by priests or rulers to receive visitors, petitioners and others. The roof of Building C was more than 1,600 square feet (150 m^{2}) in size and covered two rooms on the west side as well as main room which opened to the east through five piers. The entire exterior of the building is covered in stepped frets, with these frets arranged to give the appearance as niches. To further this effect, the inside of the frets were painted dark red and the exterior portion light blue, similar to turquoise. The broad eastern stairway was also painted with cloud-like scroll motifs.

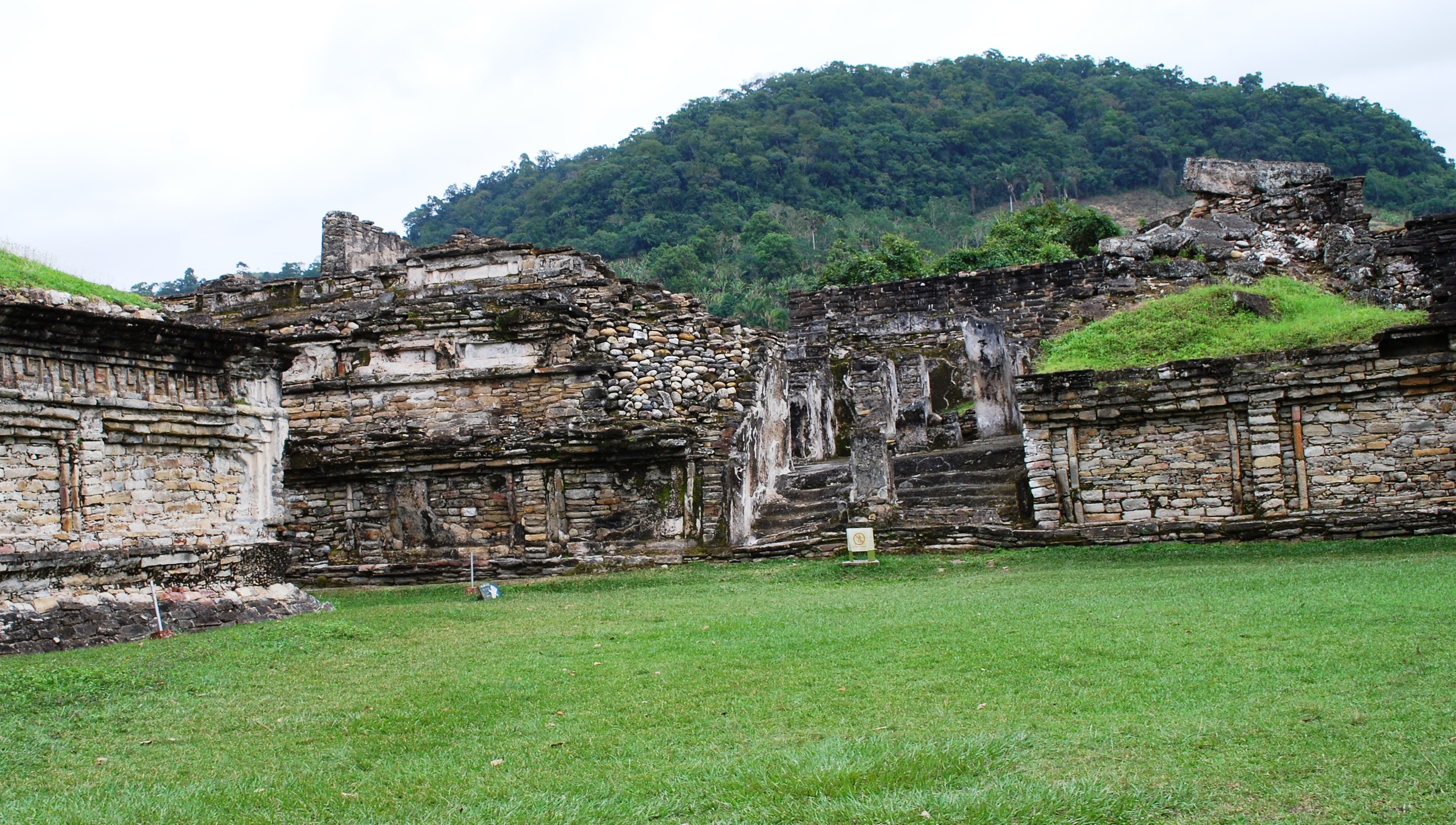
Building B

Building B is a two-story structure that was used as a residence and classified as a palace. Like other structures nearby, its roof is a thick slab of cement and there is another slab that separates the ground and upper floors. The entrance to the building from the plaza was through a divided stairway, leading to a single room 32 by 24 feet (9.8 by 7.3 m) in size. This space is broken by six stone and cement pillars which support the floor above. These columns were thickened over time as it became apparent to have stronger bracing for the weight of the two floors. The upper story is reached by narrow stairway. This floor is more spacious even though there are columns here as well. This is the only multistoried palace found outside the Mayan areas.

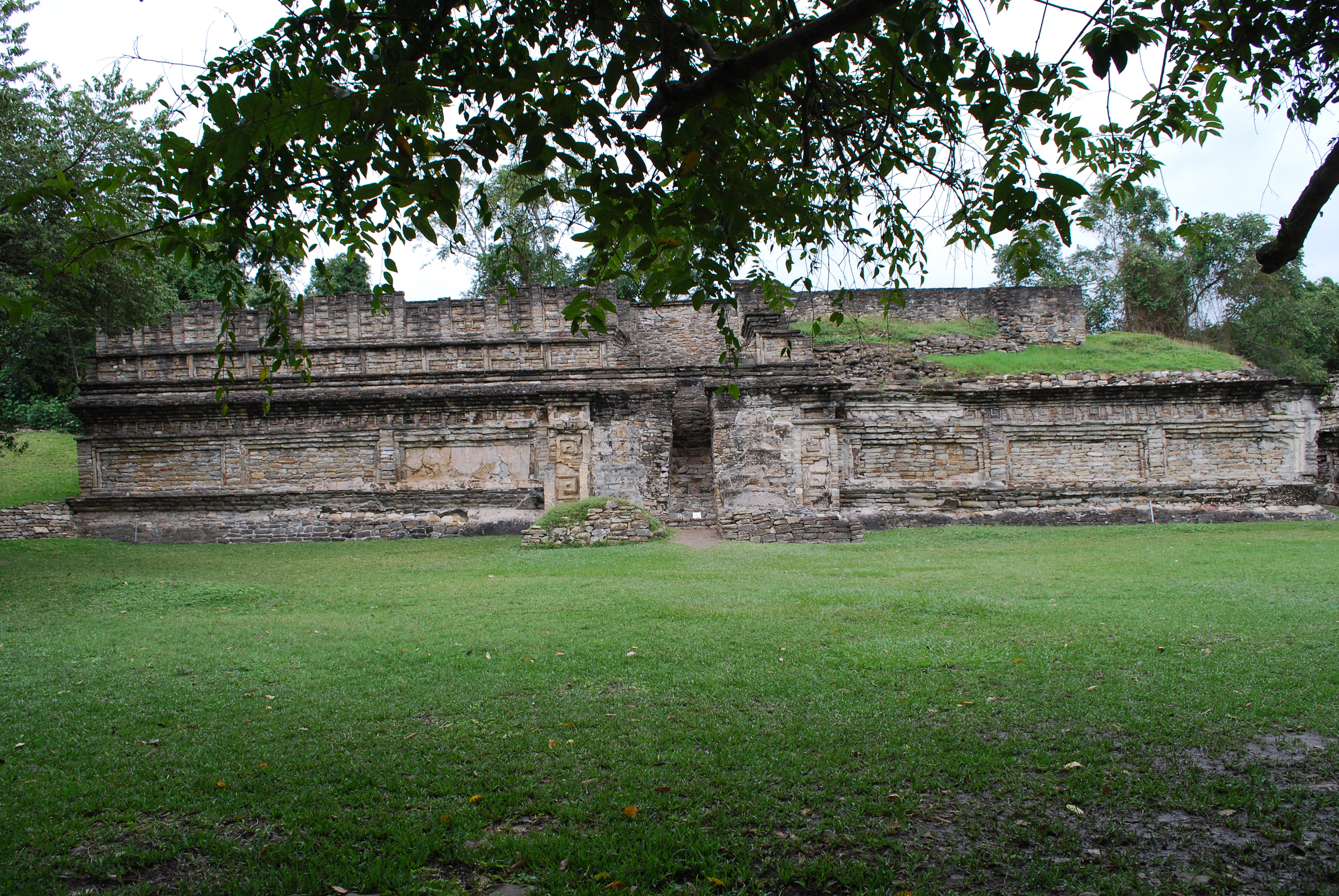
Building A

Building A has two levels, stepped frets and niches and is reminiscent of structures found in the Yucatán. However, the lower level of the building is not rooms but a solid base. The lower level is adorned with large rectangular panels which appear to have been painted red. The entrance is on the south side of the building and is quite elaborate. The upper level contains a corridor that goes all the way around and a number of rooms. The upper level was adorned with stepped frets and scrolls as well. These were painted yellow, blue, red and black. The panels inside were painted with murals, of which only fragments survive. At the east and west side of the corridors are entrances to the rooms, two interconnected rooms on each side of the building. Building A is constructed over older buildings that were buried when this area was filled in, some aspects of the building, like the buttresses been damage due to settling where there are no buildings below. The facade depicts a false stairway and balustrades of stepped frets capped by niches. It is unknown if the similarity between this building and the Pyramid of the Niches indicates a relationship between the two. The false stairs were originally adorned with scroll motifs done in blue and yellow paint, but very little remains. At the center of the false stairway are true stairs leading upwards under an arch to the first level of the palace.

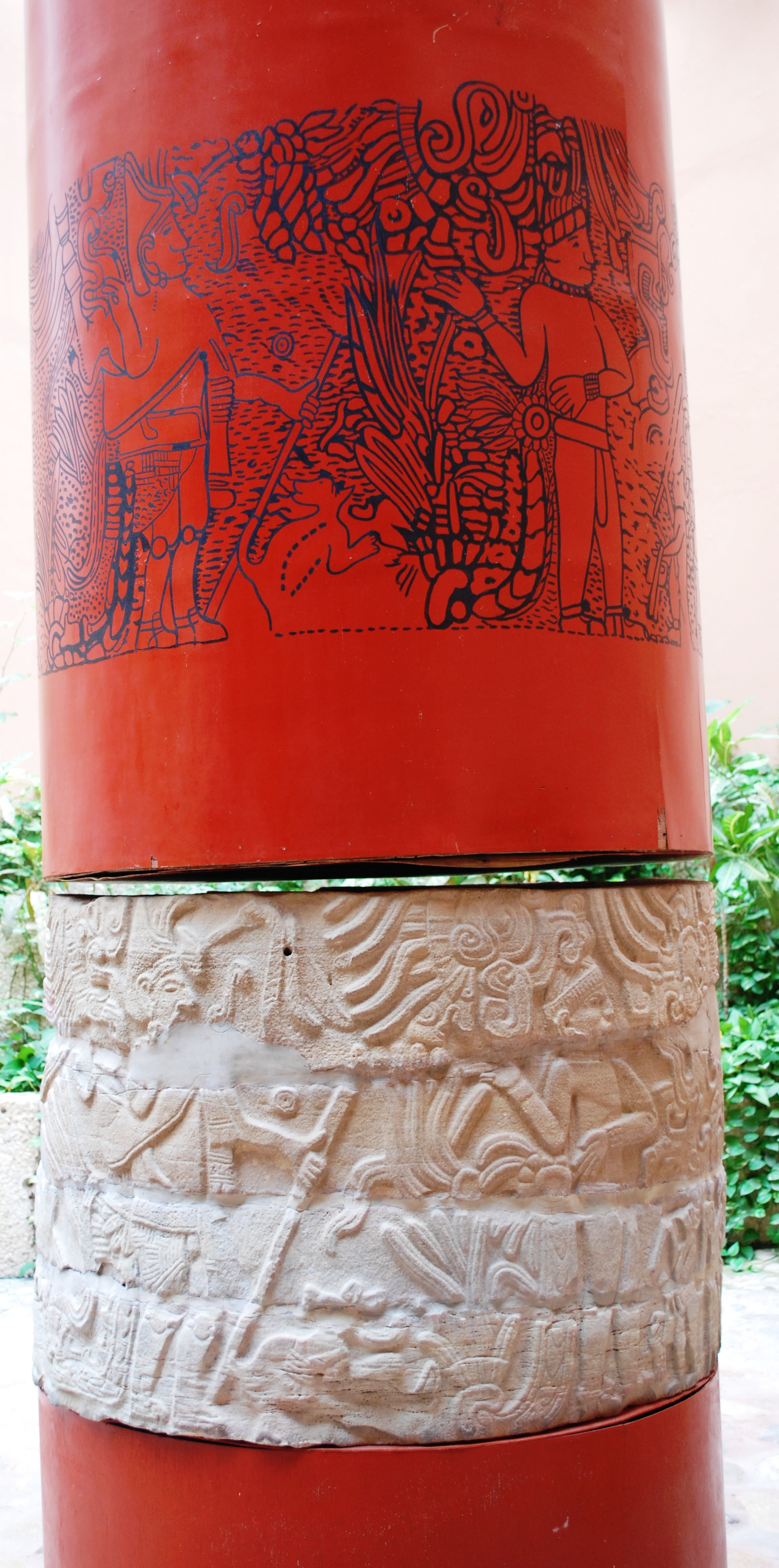
Fragments from one of the columns

The Building of the Columns dominates the highest portion of Tajin Chico. It is part of one of the last building complexes built at El Tajín. These buildings are situated on a platform-terrace with was formed on natural contours and filled in spaces. The other structure on this platform is called the Annex or the Building of the Tunnels, as it is connected to the Building of the Columns by a passageway. Behind these buildings is a large plaza with small low structures on its edges. This building is named for the columns that adorned the east facade of the structure. The columns were made by stacking circles cut from flagstone. Then the surface of the columns was sculpted with scenes celebrating a ruler named 13 Rabbit, who probably had this structure built. Most of the remains of these columns are on display at the site museum. This structure also had a cement roof, which was arched in the “porch” area between the columns and the inner rooms. There is an inner courtyard and ornately decorated, with stepped frets, other symbols in stone and cement which were painted. This complex was one of the last to be built and it also shows evidence of fire and other damage from the fall of the city.

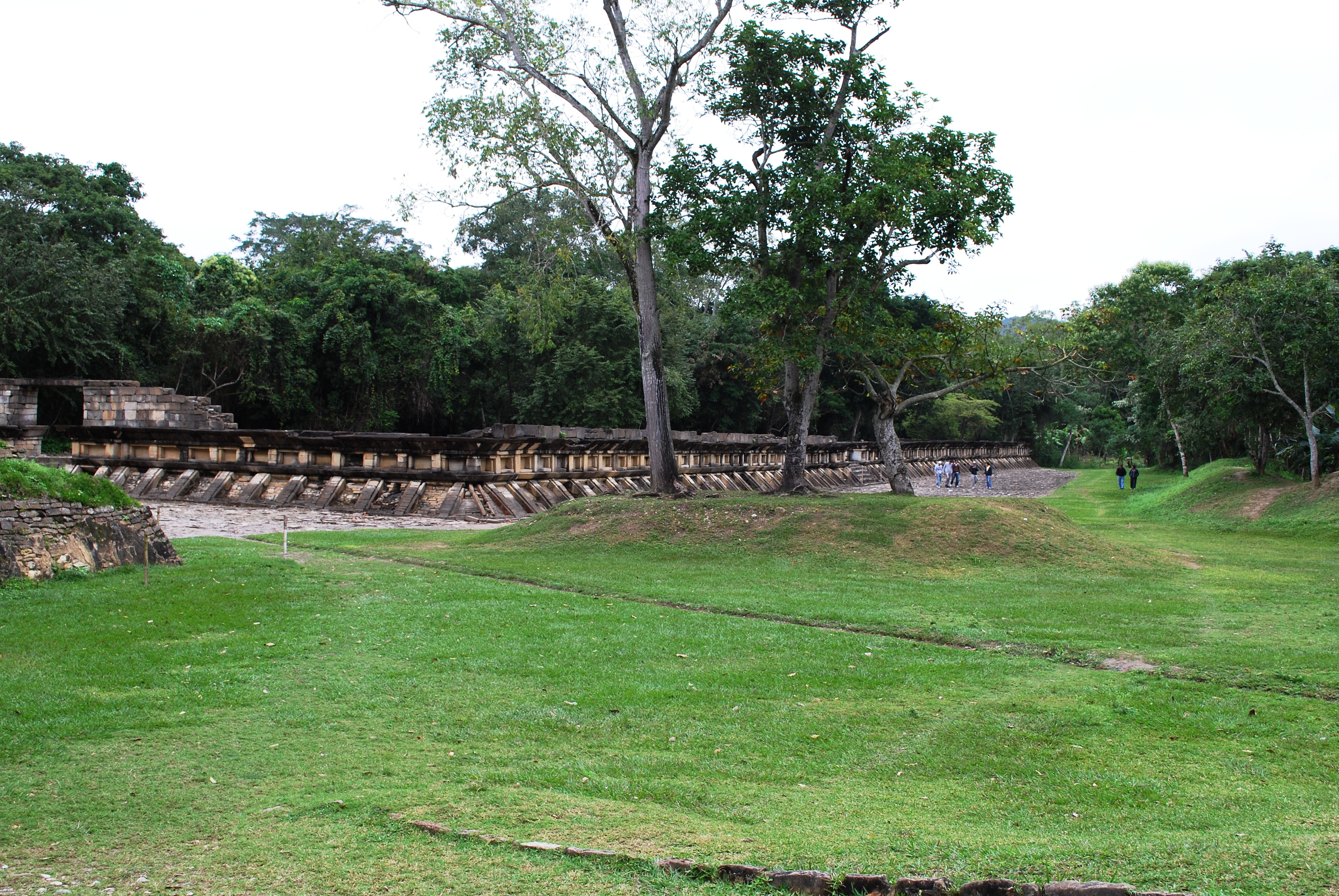
Great Xicalcoluihqui

Just east of Tajin Chico is an area of valley floor. There are numerous buildings in this section but many are not accessible to visitors due to the lack of trails and many have yet to be explored. Two have been partially explored. The first is the Great Xicalcoluihqui, or the Great Enclosure. This is a wall, which from above forms a giant stepped fret and encloses about 129,000 square feet (12,000 m^{2}). This structure is unique among Mesoamerican sites and contains two or three small ballcourts. The sides of the enclosure are formed by a slender platform with sloping sides and free standing niches, resembling the Pyramid of the Niches. There are more than a hundred niches in this wall, broken up by a number of entrances. The other structure is the Great Ballcourt, the largest court at El Tajin. It is located at the northwest corner of the Great Xicalcoluihqui and at the base of Tajin Chico. It has vertical sides and is about 213 feet (65 m) long. Unlike other ballcourts, there are no carved panels and no sculptures have been associated with this structure.

=== Buildings 3, 23, 15 and 5 ===
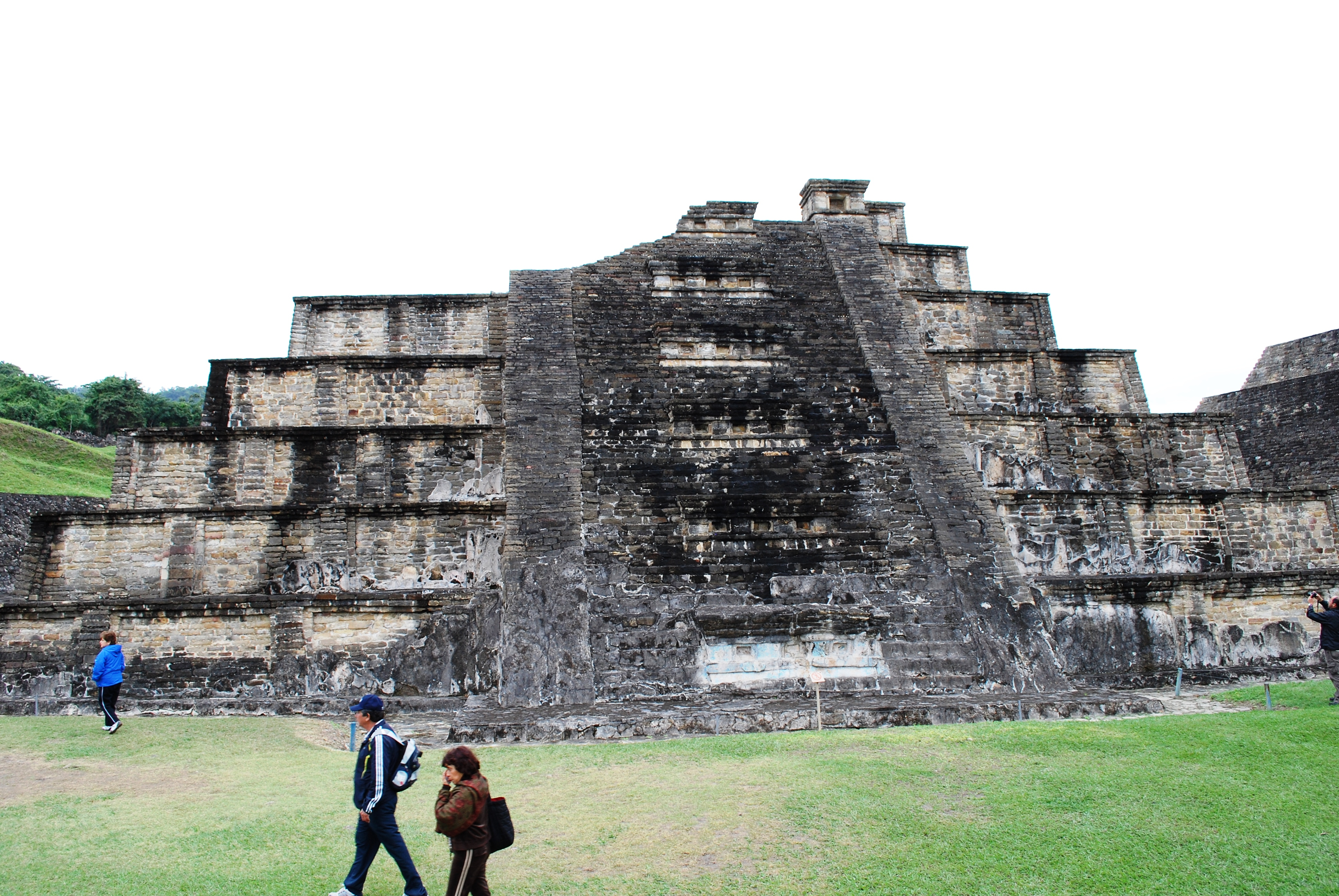
Blue Temple

Building 3 or the Blue Temple has some features that set it apart from other pyramids at the site. Except for six benches on the staircase and at the top of the balustrades, probably later additions, there are no niches. The seven stories of the pyramid are composed of gently sloping walling divided into panels of varying widths. The unreconstructed north side has a large indentation made by looters before the site was protected by guards. No sculpture is known to have come from this building and nothing of the temple at the top remains. The building was covered in cement several times over its history, and each layer of this cement was painted in blue rather than the more common red. Remnants of this paint can be seen on part of the stairway and on the side facing east toward Building 23. Blue is most often associated with the rain god but there is no other evidence to support this.

While the Blue Temple was a fairly early construction, the pyramid next to it, Building 23 was built very late in Tajin's history. It consists of five stories in near vertical talud without niches. The original staircase was destroyed then reworked into its present form. The divider in the center is a buttress to hold the fill behind the stairs in place. The stairs are made from a mixture of lime, sand and clay without a stone core. The interior of the building is composed of loose stone, mostly rounded river boulders. At the top, there the temple was located, is a series of stepped merlons which look like medieval European battlements.

Just south of Buildings 3 and 23 is Building 15, which is only partially excavated. It faces west and appears to have a civil function much like Building C in Tajín Chico. It has stairways on both the east and west sides that lead to the top of the second level. The third story begins with a wall of niches and no visible stairs. The two lower levels are adorned with larger niches as is the top of the stairway divider. Beneath the larger niches is a line of seven panels. Under the fourth panel, an older panel was found. Deeper excavation found an older, damaged structure which was covered over by the visible structure. This building is thought to be the last built with niches.

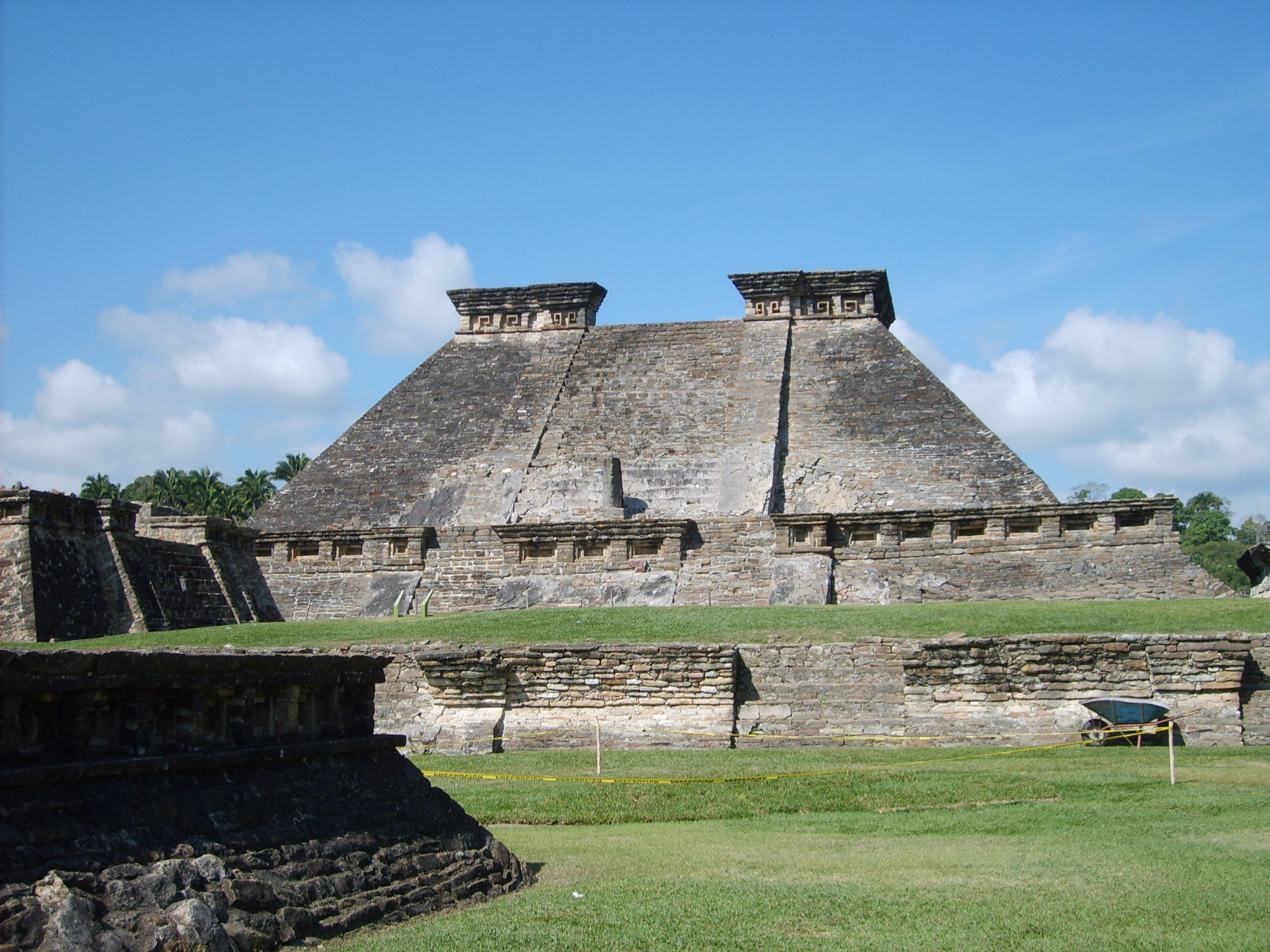
View of Building 5

Building 5 is considered to be the stateliest of the El Tajin site. While located next to the Pyramid of the Niches, its visual appeal is not lost to its more famous neighbor. It is located in the center of a pyramid complex and consists of a truncated pyramid rising from a platform that is over 32,000 square feet (3,000 m^{2}) in size. Access to the first level of the pyramid, which is lined with niches, is via a single staircase on the west side or a double staircase on the east side. Access to the top of the pyramid, where the temple once stood, is via a double staircase on the east side. The top of the pyramid contains two platforms, both of which are decorated with stepped frets. Between the two sets of staircases on the first level on the east side is a tall column-line sculpture. It had been thrown down from the top of the pyramid in ancient times and broken. Archeologists reassembled it at the spot in which it was found. The sculpture is similar in style to the carved stone yokes of Veracruz. The figure seems to be an allegorical representation of a seated figure with a severed upper torso and a skull for a head. The arms are holding a serpent like form and the body contains scrolls, which may signify sacrificial blood. The small buildings that surround this pyramid are meant to complement it. However, the one on the northeast side has been completely destroyed due to centuries-old trail that was used when this area was still jungle.

=== The North and South Ballcourts ===
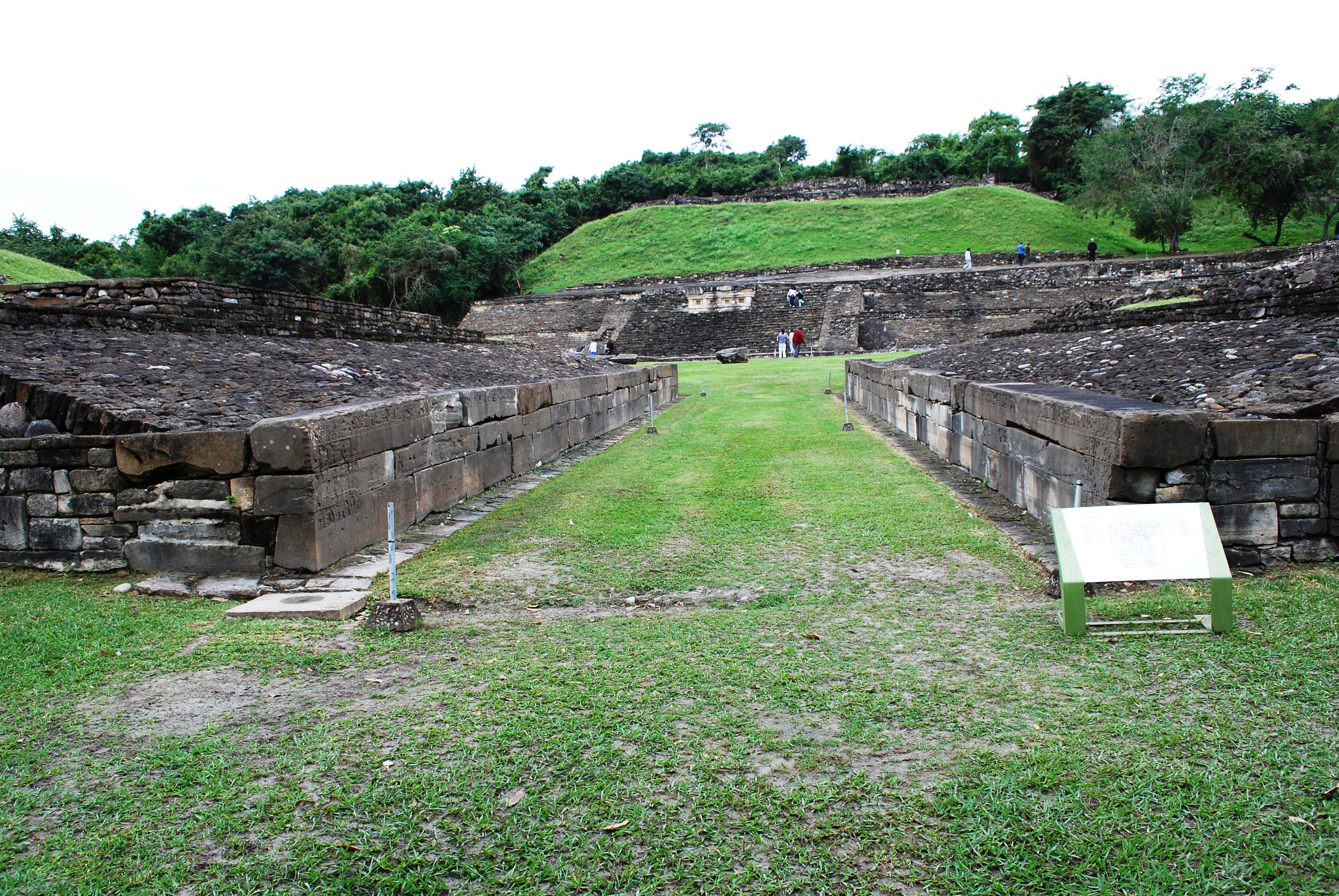
View of North Ball Court

The North Ballcourt is constructed by three layers of large flagstones. There are six carved panels with ritual scenes and an ornamental frieze that runs along both walls. The court is 87 feet (27 m) long, which is considered to be unusually small and has vertical rather than sloping walls. It is probably one of the oldest structures at Tajín.

Portions of the panels and friezes are worn to the point that large areas are incomplete. The four end panels have scenes relating to the ritual of the ball game that result in entreaties to the gods. The central panels depict the gods responding or performing a ritual of their own. Variant forms of the god of pulque appear over each of the end panels, suggesting that the drink was an important part of the ritual. The southeast, east and northwest panels show a ruler on a throne. The southwest panel has a figure dressed as an eagle seated in a vat of liquid, probably pulque, and being fed by a female figure on the left and a male on the right. The deteriorated north central panel shows two cross-legged figures facing each other. One is seated on a throne and the other by a pulque vat. In the center are two intertwined serpents which seem to form the shape of a tlaxmalactl or ball game marker. The friezes running along the upper edges of the court are composed of interlocking scroll figures, each containing a central element of a head and an eye. Many have feathered headdresses and reptilian attributes and a few are human like.

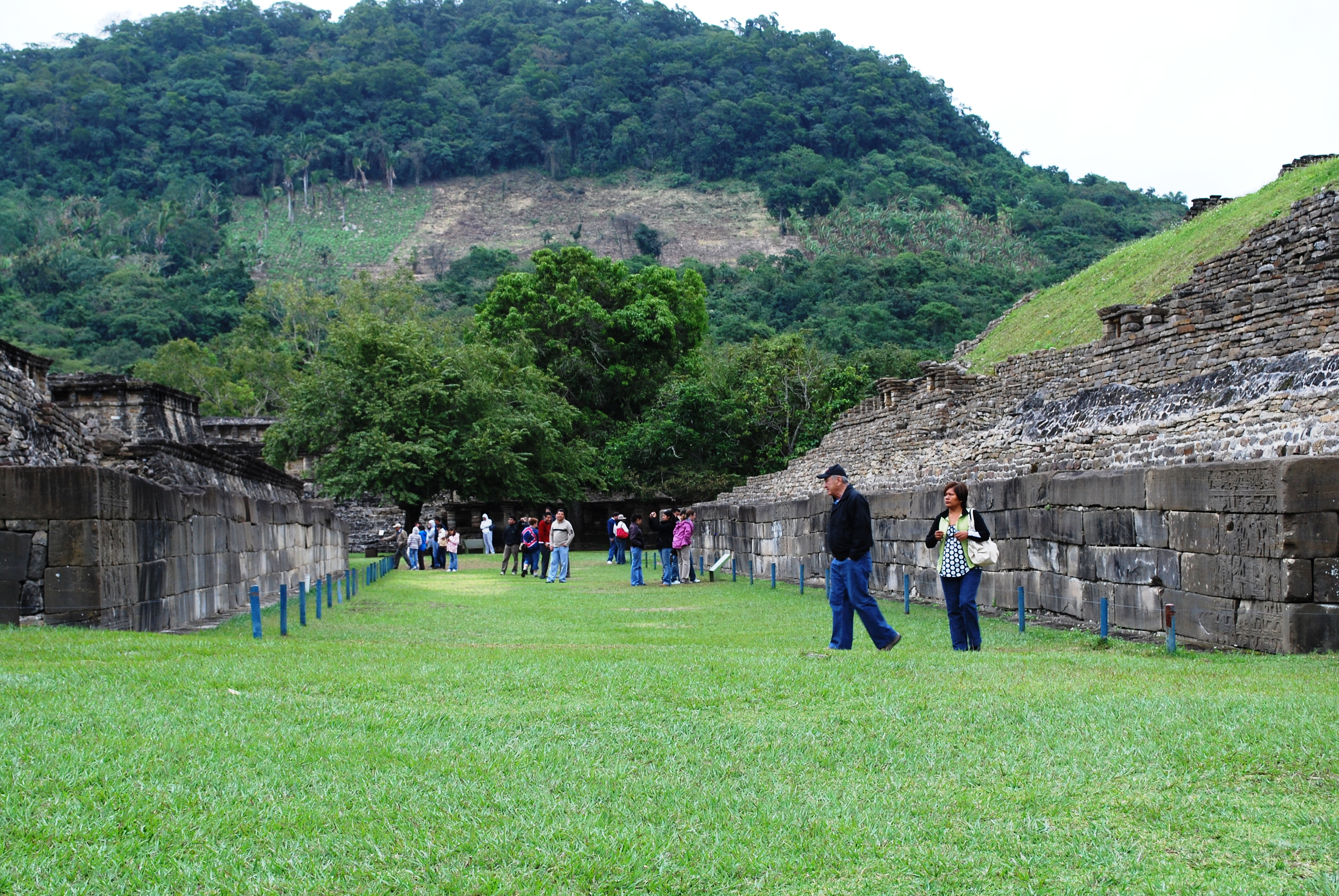
View of South Ball Court

The South Ballcourt, like the North Ball court, has only vertical walls which are sculpted. The sculpted panels on these walls remain largely intact and show in step-by-step fashion how the ball game was played here, complete with ceremonies, sacrifice and the response of the gods. The court has a general east-west alignment and is 198 feet (60 m) long and 34.5 feet (10.5 m) wide. Spectators could watch events from Building 5 to the north and Building 6 to the south as well as from stands built on one side of the court. The court is made of stones of up to ten tons in weight many of which came from outside the valley. Once the court walls were built six panels were sculpted at the corners and centers of the two walls. The panels on the ends show scenes from the ballgame itself and the center panels show responses from the gods.

The southeast panel illustrates the opening ritual when the principal participant is elaborately dressed and is being handed a bundle of spears. This is part of an initial activity before the game itself starts. Overlooking this scene is the death deity who rises from a vat of liquid, perhaps pulque. The glyphs above the deity identify it with the planet Venus. Next is the southwest panel in which a different ceremonial preparation is depicted. The principal participant is supine on a kind of a sofa. Two musicians are playing a turtle shell drum and clay rattles. A figure dressed as an eagle dances in front while a skeletal deity flies above and the death deity rises from liquid. The northwest panel shows the beginning of the ballgame. Two participants are standing in the center of the court with speech scrolls emerging from their mouths. One holds a large knife in his left hand and gestures with his right. Between them are intertwined slashes, the symbol of the ballgame and a ball. At their waists are the protective and ritual accoutrements which are very similar to the stone yokes, palmas and hachas common in elite burials. Behind the players are two figures, one with a deer head, who are watching from the court walls as well as the death deity again above. The northeast panel indicates that the game has been played and one of the participants is about to be sacrificed by having his head cut off. The three figures are all dressed in the garments and symbols of the ballgame. The center figure has his arms held back by the one on the left. The figure on the right holds a large knife which is at the center figure's neck. There are scrolls indicating speech from the sacrifice as well as a depiction of the skeletal god.

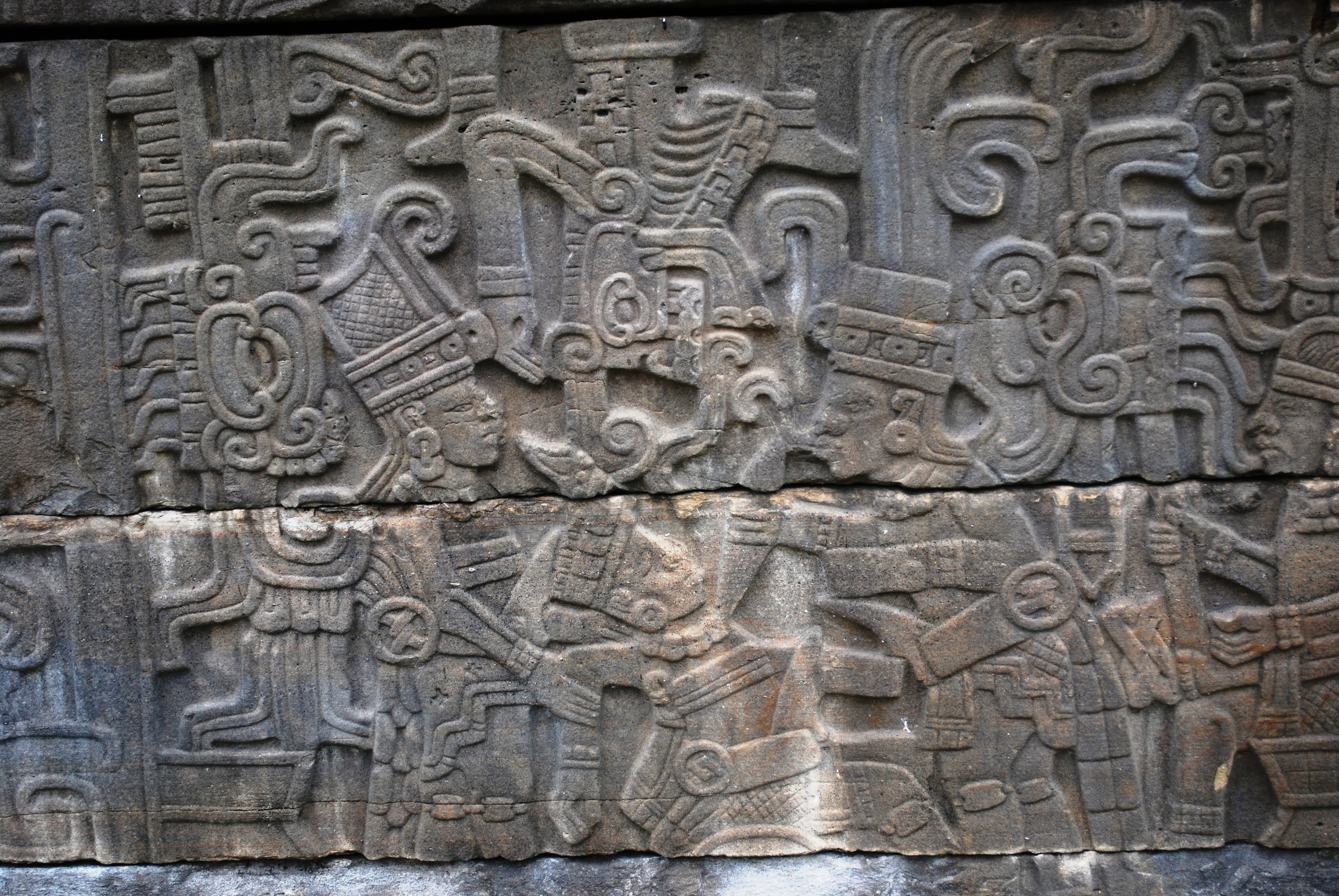
Panel showing ballplayer being beheaded

After this point, the panels deal with the response of the gods. The north central panel represents the continuation of the ritual in the afterlife, and shows how the events of the game connect the society of El Tajin to the gods. At the center of the scene is a temple with the rain and wind gods seated on top and a vat of liquid within. The sacrificed player appears here, whole and with a pot under his arm. He points to the vat and addresses the rain god. The liquid is protected by a reclining chacmool, who is speaking. What is being requested is pulque, indicated by a glyph indicating the mythical origin of the drink and a split image of the god of pulque above the scene. On the south central panel is depicting a scene after the sacrificed ball player has received the pulque with the same temple, glyphs and depiction of the pulque god. The differences are a depiction of the moon as a rabbit, the rain god in front of the temple and the level of the liquid in the vat lowered. The rain god is shown in a rite of auto sacrifice running a spike through part of his penis. The blood falls into the vat and to refill it with pulque.

== The Cumbre Tajín event ==
The Cumbre Tajín is an annual artistic and cultural festival which is held at the site in March. The Cumbre Tajín is considered to be an identity festival of the Totonacs, who are considered to be the guardians of El Tajín. Events include those traditional to the Totonac culture as well as modern arts and events from cultures from as far as Tibet. Some of the events include musical concerts, experiencing a temazcal, theatrical events and visiting El Tajín at night, with a total over 5,000 activities. Many of the cultural, craft and gastronomic events occur at the adjacent Parque Takilhsukut which just located just outside the archeological site. In 2008, 160,000 attended the event which featured Fito Páez, Ximena Sariñana and Los Tigres del Norte. Thirty percent of the revenue the event generates goes toward scholarships for Totonaca youth.

In 2009, the event added the Encuentro Internacional de Voladores (International Encounter of Voladores). For five days, voladores from various places perform at the poles erected at the site. The objective is not only to see the different costumes and styles of the groups but to share experiences about the fertility ritual. Voladores come from as far as San Luis Potosi and Guatemala.

The Cumbre Tajín has been criticized for its emphasis on modern shows rather than on cultural events. One criticism is the illumination of pyramids at night without any kind of cultural historical instruction. The criticism is that it disrespects the site and the Totonac people. There are also fears that large numbers of visitors to the site for events such as concerts by names such as Alejandra Guzmán damage the site. However, the Centro de Artes Indígenas de Veracruz states that it works very hard to preserve and promote Totonac culture through the event, sponsoring events such as traditional cooking, painting and the ritual of the Voladores.
