= Herbert Spinden =

American anthropologist and art historian (1879–1967)

Herbert J. Spinden from the archive of the American Museum of Natural History archaeology division.

Herbert Joseph Spinden (1879–1967) was an American anthropologist, archaeologist and art historian who specialized in the study of Native American cultures of the US and Mesoamerica.

== Biography ==
Spinden was born in 1879 in Huron, a small settlement in the Dakota Territory. He later recalled that his early childhood was spent on the edge of civilization where his family lived in a sod hut with oiled paper covering the windows. Later they moved to Tacoma, Washington where he attended public schools. Before starting college he worked on railroad surveys in the Northwest and in 1900, a gold rush drew him to Nome, Alaska.

Spinden started Harvard University in 1902 and studied anthropology and archaeology. In the summer of 1905 he and a fellow student excavated a Mandan village in North Dakota and studied the language and culture of that tribe. They published a paper on the topic in 1906, Spinden's first publication. After receiving an A.B. degree in 1906, he continued his studies at Harvard where he specialized in Mayan art under the direction of Alfred Tozzer. He received a doctorate degree in 1909 after submitting his thesis, A Study of Mayan Art, which has been called a "brilliant analysis of the evolution of styles".

He then worked American Museum of Natural History where he undertook archaeological studies in Mexico and Central America. While working as an archaeologist in Central America he and Sylvanus G. Morley were among the American scientists gathering intelligence for the US Army.

He then curated the collection of the Peabody Museum at Harvard, before taking museum positions in Brooklyn and Buffalo. He also did ethnographic studies among the Nez Percé. In 1919 he published a study of Mayan calendrics giving a correlation between the Mayan calendar and the Gregorian calendar – a correlation which was nonetheless not widely accepted.

Spinden's first wife was archaeologist Ellen S. Spinden; they separated in 1938 and eventually divorced. In 1948, Spinden married dancer Ailes Gilmour. They had a son, Joseph.

== Works ==
- The Ancient Civilisations of Mexico and Central America, Handbook no. 3 (New York: American Museum of Natural History, 1922)
