= Levi B. Gaylord =

- Born: September 23, 1840; Boston, Massachusetts, US
- Died: December 6, 1900 (aged 60)
- Military career
- Allegiance: United States
- Branch: US Army
- Service years: 1861 - 1865
- Rank: Sergeant
- Units: Company A, 29th Massachusetts Volunteer Infantry Regiment
- Conflicts: Battle of Fort Stedman; American Civil War
- Awards: Medal of Honor

Levi B. Gaylord (September 23, 1840 – December 6, 1900) was an American soldier who fought in the American Civil War. Gaylord received the United States' highest award for bravery during combat, the Medal of Honor. Gaylord's medal was won for his actions during the Battle of Fort Stedman in Petersburg, Virginia on March 25, 1865. He was honored with the award on June 22, 1896.

Gaylord joined the Army from Boston in April 1861, and mustered out with his regiment in July 1865.

== Medal of Honor citation ==
The President of the United States of America, in the name of Congress, takes pleasure in presenting the Medal of Honor to Sergeant Levi B. Gaylord, United States Army, for extraordinary heroism on 25 March 1865, while serving with Company A, 29th Massachusetts Infantry, in action at Fort Stedman, Virginia. Sergeant Gaylord voluntarily assisted in working an abandoned gun, while exposed to heavy fire, until the enemy's advancing line was routed by a charge on its left flank.

== See also ==
- List of American Civil War Medal of Honor recipients: G–L
