= Yohualichan =

Archaeological site in Mexico

Coordinates: 20°3′42″N 97°30′10″W

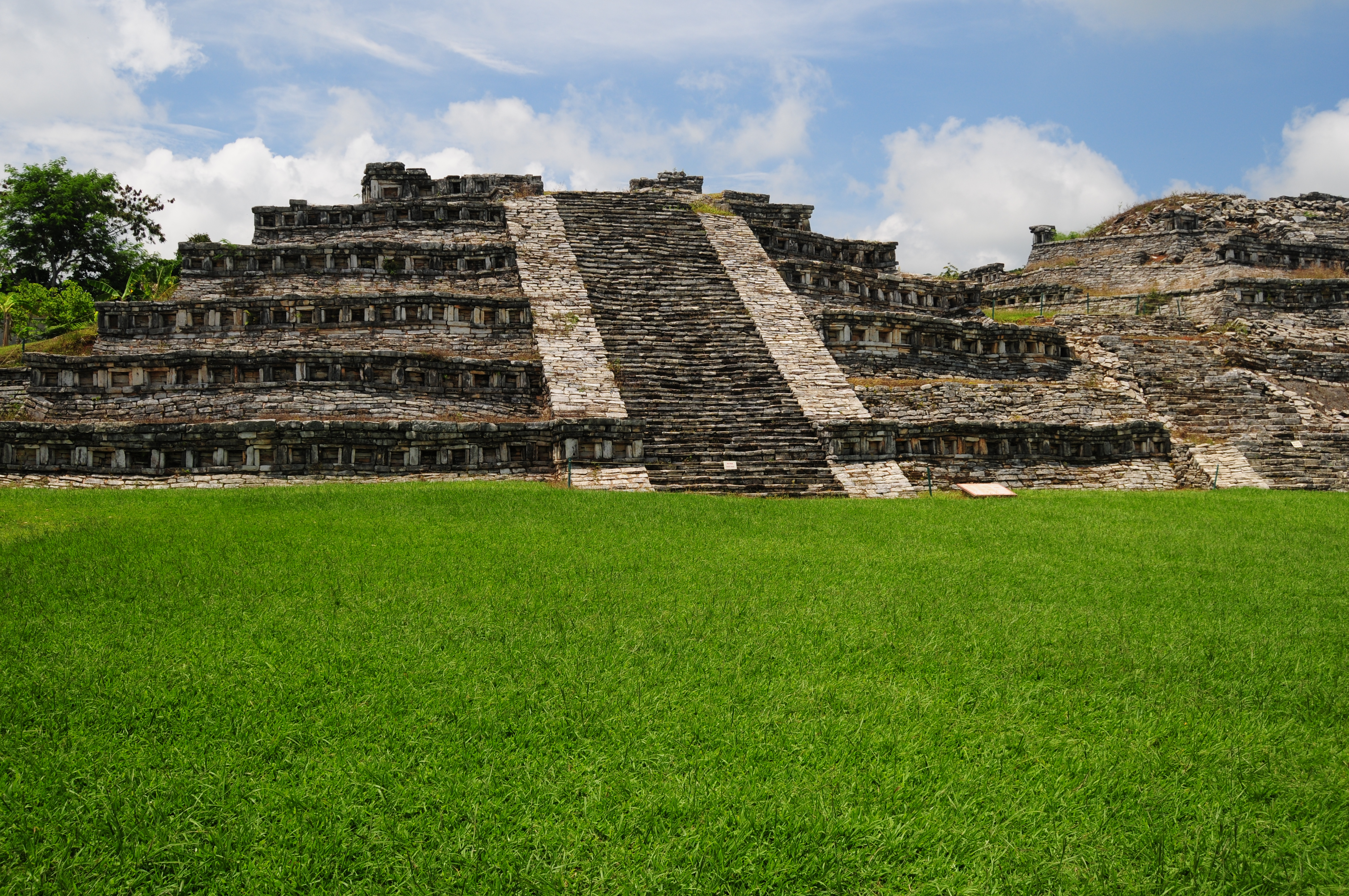
Archaeological zone of Yohualichan

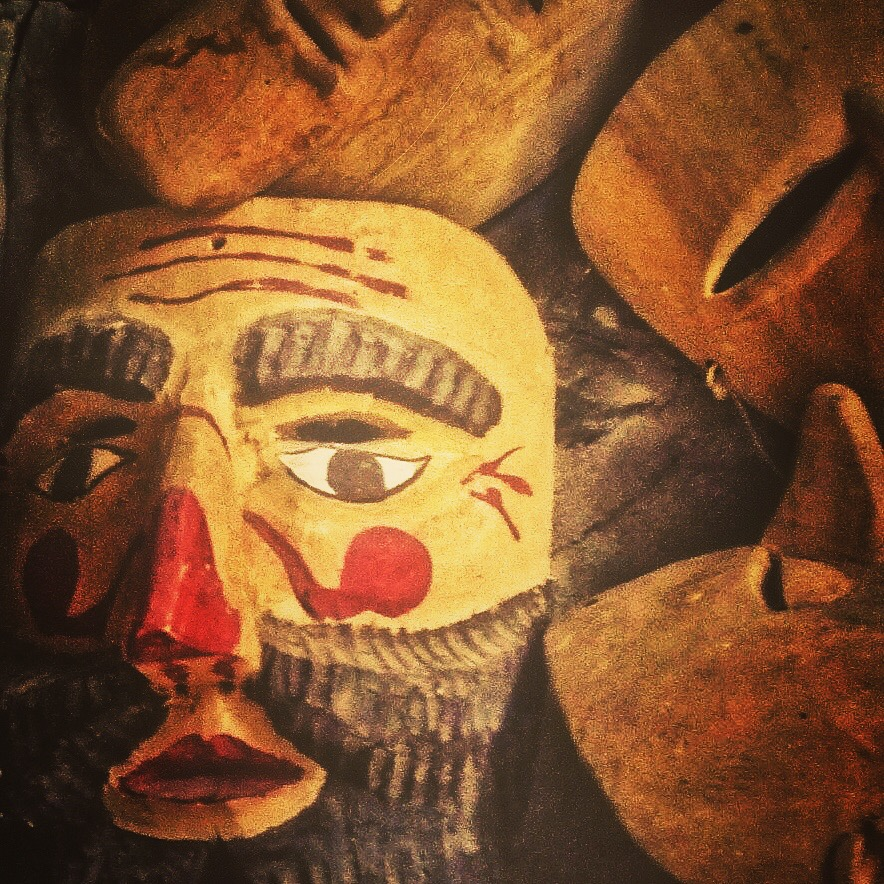
Máscaras Yohualichan

Yohualichan (Yohualican or House of Night in Nahuatl) is a Pre-Columbian archaeological site located in Cuetzalan del Progreso in the Mexican state of Puebla.

== History ==
Yohualican and the larger nearby city of El Tajín both reached a cultural and political epoch during the Classic period and are both believed to have been constructed and populated by the Totonac people.

With the end of the Classic Period, the nomadic Chichimecas begin migrating into the modern day Valley of Mexico around the year 1200. From then on, Yohualican would come under pressure from these migratory tribes and would begin to fall into a gradual decline.
