= List of places in Mexico named after people =

There are a number of places in Mexico named after famous people.

== Aguascalientes ==
- Adolfo López Mateos (Aguascalientes) – Adolfo López Mateos
- Calvillo – José Calvillo (founder)
- Cosío – Felipe Cosío, Governor
- Pabellón de Arteaga – José María Artega, 19th century national hero
- Pabellón de Hidalgo (Aguascalientes) – Miguel Hidalgo
- San Francisco de los Romo – Francis of Assisi
- San José de Gracia, Aguascalientes – Joseph Villaseñor, son of Ferdinand VII of Spain
- Villa Juárez (Aguascalientes) – Benito Juárez
- Villa Jesús Terán (Aguascalientes) – Jesús Terán Peredo (governor)

== Baja California ==
- Alberto Oviedo Mota (Baja California) – Dr. Alberto Oviedo Mota (1882–1953)
- Guadalupe Victoria, Baja California – Guadalupe Victoria
- San Quintín Municipality – Quentin of Amiens (d. c. AD 287)
- Venustiano Carranza, Baja California – Venustiano Carranza, President of Mexico
- Vicente Guerrero, Baja California – Vicente Guerrero
- Villa de Juárez (Ensenada) – Benito Juárez, President of Mexico

== Baja California Sur ==
- Melitón Albáñez Domínguez, Baja California Sur – General Melitón Albañez (1880–1917)
- Puerto Adolfo López Mateos (Baja California Sur) – Adolfo López Mateos

== Campeche ==
- Alfredo V. Bonfil (Campeche) – Alfredo Vladimir Bonfil, a Peasant leader
- Bolonchén de Rejón – Manuel Crescencio García Rejón (1799–1849), jurist
- Ciudad del Carmen - Our Lady of Mount Carmel
- Candelaria Municipality - Virgin of Candelaria
- Emiliano Zapata (Campeche) – Emiliano Zapata
- Escárcega – Francisco Escárcega Márquez (1896–1938), a native from Tlaxcala who fought in the 1910 revolution and railroad builder of United Railroads of the Southeast Company
- Ingeniero Eugenio Echeverría Castellot (Calakmul, Campeche) – Eugenio Echeverría Castellot (1918–1999), governor of Campeche
- Iturbide (Campeche) – Agustín de Iturbide
- Juárez (Campeche) – Benito Juárez
- Villa Madero (Campeche) – Francisco I. Madero

== Chiapas ==
- Ángel Albino Corzo – Ángel Albino Corzo (1816–1875), liberal politician, governor (1856–1860)
- Bejucal de Ocampo – Melchor Ocampo, politician, senator
- Benemérito de las Américas – Benito Juárez
- Berriozábal – Felipe Berriozábal, military and politician
- Capitán Luis Ángel Vidal – Captain Luis Vidal, hero of the Battle of Chiapa de Corzo
- Chiapa de Corzo – Ángel Albino Corzo
- Dr. Manuel Velasco Suárez (Chiapas) and El Porvenir de Velasco Suárez – Manuel Velasco Suárez, neurologist and former governor of Chiapas in 1970 to 1976
- Dr. Rodulfo Figueroa (Chiapas) – Mexican poet and physician Dr. es:Rodulfo Figueroa Esquinca (1866–1899)
- Efrain A. Gutierrez (Chiapas) – Efrain Antonio Gutierrez (1894–1985), Governor of Chiapas in 1936 to 1940
- Ejido Raymundo Enríquez - Raymundo E. Enríquez (1889-1968), Governor of Chiapas
- Emiliano Zapata, Chiapas – Emiliano Zapata
- Francisco León, Chiapas – Francisco Leon, Governor of Chiapas
- Frontera Hidalgo – Miguel Hidalgo, Father of the fatherland
- Joaquín Amaro (Chiapas) – Gral. Joaquín Amaro
- Juárez, Chiapas – Benito Juárez, president of Mexico
- Larráinzar – Manuel Larráinzar, politician
- Marqués de Comillas – Claudio López, 2nd Marquess of Comillas
- Mazapa de Madero – Francisco I. Madero, president of Mexico
- Miguel Alemán (Chiapas) – Miguel Alemán Valdés
- Montecristo de Guerrero – Jesus and Vicente Guerrero
- Motozintla de Mendoza – Ismael Mendoza Sanchez (1882–1920)
- Nicolás Ruiz – 19th-century Governor of Chiapas, Nicolás Ruiz
- Ocozocoautla de Espinosa – Luis Espinosa (1880–1926)
- Rayón, Chiapas – Ignacio López Rayón
- Rincón Chamula San Pedro – Peter the Apostle
- San Andrés Larráinzar – Saint Andrew and Manuel Larráinzar
- San Cristóbal de las Casas – Bartolomé de las Casas, 15th century Spanish writer
- San Fernando, Chiapas – Ferdinand III of Castile (d. 1252)
- San Lucas, Chiapas – Luke the Evangelist
- Santiago el Pinar – James the Great (d. AD 44)
- Tuxtla Gutiérrez – es:Joaquín Miguel Gutiérrez (1796–1838), Conservative politician, independence leader
- Unión Juárez, Chiapas – Benito Juárez
- Venustiano Carranza, Chiapas – Venustiano Carranza, President of Mexico
- Villa Corzo – Ángel Albino Corzo

== Chihuahua ==
- Ahumada Municipality – Miguel Ahumada, Governor of Chihuahua
- Aldama Municipality, Chihuahua – Juan Aldama
- Allende Municipality, Chihuahua – Ignacio Allende
- Aquiles Serdán Municipality – Aquiles Serdán
- Batopilas de Manuel Gómez Morín – Manuel Gómez Morín, academic and politician
- Bismarck, Chihuahua - Otto von Bismarck
- Cárdenas – Lázaro Cárdenas, President
- Chínipas de Almada – Francisco R. Almada (1896-1989), a historian and two-time governor of Chihuahua.
- Ciudad Cuauhtémoc, Chihuahua – Cuauhtémoc
- Ciudad Juárez – Benito Juárez, President
- Colonia LeBaron – Alma Dayer LeBaron Sr., Joel LeBaron and Ervil LeBaron, one of a Mormon fundamentalists leaders
- Coronado Municipality – es:Esteban Coronado (1832-1860), liberal soldier in Reform War
- Creel, Chihuahua - Enrique Creel, Governor of Chihuahua and Vice-President of Kansas City, Mexico and Orient Railway company
- Cuauhtémoc Municipality – Cuauhtémoc, Tlatoani of Tenochtitlan (1520-1521)
- Doctor Porfirio Parra - Dr. Porfirio Parra (1854-1912), physician and state senator
- Dr. Belisario Domínguez Municipality – Belisario Domínguez (1863-1913), senator from Chiapas
- Flores Magón, Chihuahua - Ricardo Flores Magón
- Galeana – Hermenegildo Galeana (1762-1814), insurgent leader
- Gómez Farías Municipality, Chihuahua – Valentín Gómez Farías, President
- Gran Morelos – José María Morelos (1765-1815), priest and insurgent leader
- Guerrero, Chihuahua – Vicente Guerrero, President
- Hacienda Humboldt - Alexander von Humboldt
- Hidalgo del Parral – Miguel Hidalgo, priest and insurgent leader
- Ignacio Zaragoza Municipality – Ignacio Zaragoza (1829-1862), general who won the Battle of Puebla
- Jiménez Municipality – José Mariano Jiménez (1781-1811), engineer and soldier in the Mexican War of Independence
- López Municipality – Octaviano López, a republican soldier killed in the battle of Talamantes on 1860.
- Manuel Benavides – Manuel Benavides Armendáriz (1858-1913), a native revolutionary who died in combat on 1913
- Mariano Matamoros – Mariano Matamoros, priest and insurgent leader
- Morelos Municipality – José María Morelos
- Ocampo Municipality – Melchor Ocampo (1814-1861), lawyer and liberal politician
- Ojinaga – Manuel Ojinaga Castañeda (1834–1865), Governor of Chihuahua
- Oscar Soto Maynez (Chihuahua) - Óscar Soto Maynez (1904-1975), Governor of Chihuahua
- Práxedis G. Guerrero Municipality – es:Práxedis G. Guerrero (1882-1910), anarchist and philosopher
- Ranchería Luis L. León (Aldama) - Luis Laureano León (1890-1981), Governor of Chihuahua
- Riva Palacio Municipality – Vicente Riva Palacio (1832-1896), liberal politician
- San Francisco de Borja Municipality - Francis Borgia (1510-1572)
- San Francisco de Conchos – Francis of Assisi (1182-1226)
- San Francisco del Oro Municipality - Francis of Assisi (1182-1226) and Francisco Molina, founder
- San Francisco Javier de Satevó – Francis Xavier
- Santa Bárbara Municipality – Saint Barbara (d. AD 3rd century)
- Santa Isabel Municipality – Elizabeth, mother of John the Baptist
- Valle de Zaragoza – Ignacio Zaragoza

== Coahuila ==
- Abasolo, Coahuila – Mariano Abasolo
- Adolfo López Mateos, Coahuila – Adolfo López Mateos, President
- Allende, Coahuila – Ignacio Allende
- Arteaga – José María Arteaga Magallanes, Governor of Querétaro (1858)
- Ciudad Acuña – Manuel Acuña, poet
- Cuatrocienegas de Carranza – President Venustiano Carranza, who was born in Cuatrocieneagas in 1859
- Diana Laura Riojas (Coahuila) – Diana Laura Riojas de Colosio (1957–1994), Luis Donaldo Colosio's widow
- Escobedo, Coahuila – General Mariano Escobedo
- Francisco I. Madero, Coahuila – Francisco I. Madero, President
- Flores Magon, Coahuila – Ricardo Flores Magón, Jesús Flores Magón and Enrique Flores Magón
- General Cepeda – Victoriano Cepeda Camacho, (1826–1892), a general and a governor of Coahuila
- Guerrero, Coahuila – Vicente Guerrero, President
- Hidalgo, Coahuila – Miguel Hidalgo
- Jiménez, Coahuila – José Mariano Jiménez
- Juárez Municipality, Coahuila – Benito Juárez, President
- Lamadrid Municipality, Coahuila – Francisco Lamadrid
- Lázaro Cárdenas, Coahuila – Lázaro Cárdenas, President
- Lucio Blanco, Coahuila – Lucio Blanco, revolutionary
- Matamoros Municipality – Mariano Matamoros (1770–1814), priest and independence leader
- Monclova – Melchor Portocarrero, 3rd Count of Monclova
- Morelos Municipality – José María Morelos (1765–1815), priest and independence leader
- Nava, Coahuila – Pedro de Nava, Commander general of New Spain
- Ocampo, Coahuila – Melchor Ocampo
- Ramos Arizpe – Miguel Ramos Arizpe, priest and politician
- San Buenaventura Municipality, Coahuila – Giovanni di Fidanza (1221–1274), Franciscan scholastic theologian and philosopher
- San Pedro Municipality, Coahuila – Saint Peter
- Santa Rosa de Múzquiz – Saint Rose of Lima and Melchor Múzquiz, President
- Viesca – José María y Viesca, Governor of Coahuila and Nuevo León
- Zaragoza, Coahuila – Ignacio Zaragoza

== Colima ==
- Arturo Noriega Pizano – Prof. Arturo Noriega Pizano (1915–1994), governor of Colima
- Cuauhtémoc, Colima – Cuauhtémoc
- Madrid, Colima – the Madrid family who are owners on their place at a time
- Pueblo Juárez – Benito Juárez, President
- Venustiano Carranza – Venustiano Carranza, President
- Villa de Álvarez – General Manuel Álvarez, first governor

== Durango ==
- Adolfo López Mateos (Aguinaldo) – Adolfo López Mateos
- Arturo Martinez Adame, Durango – Arturo Martinez Adame (1896–1970), lawyer and politician
- Canelas, Durango – Captain Mateo Canelas
- Ciudad Guadalupe Victoria and Victoria de Durango – Guadalupe Victoria, First President
- Ciudad Lerdo – Miguel Lerdo de Tejada
- Coneto de Comonfort – Ignacio Comonfort
- Domingo Arrieta – General Domingo Arrieta León, Mexican general and statesman
- Dr. Francisco Castillo Nájera – Francisco Castillo Nájera, diplomat and politician
- Francisco I. Madero, Durango – Francisco I. Madero, President of Mexico
- General Simón Bolívar – Simón Bolívar, South American liberator
- Gómez Palacio, Durango – Francisco Gómez Palacio, writer
- José Ramón Valdés – Prof. José Ramón Valdés (1888–1975), politician
- Ocampo Municipality – Melchor Ocampo
- Pastor Rouaix – Pastor Rouaix (1874–1950), politician
- Raul Madero – General Raul Madero (1888–1982), a former President's brother
- San Bernardo Municipality, Durango – Bernard of Corleone (1605-1667)
- San Juan de Guadalupe – Saint John the Baptist and Our Lady of Guadalupe
- San Juan del Río del Centauro del Norte, Durango – Pancho Villa
- San Luis del Cordero – Don Luis del Cordero (Founder)
- San Pedro del Gallo Municipality – Saint Peter
- Santa Clara Municipality, Durango – Clare of Assisi (1194-1253)
- Santiago Papasquiaro Municipality – James the Great
- Tlahualilo de Zaragoza – Ignacio Zaragoza
- Vicente Guerrero, Durango – Vicente Guerrero
- Villa Hidalgo, Durango – Miguel Hidalgo
- Villa Ocampo, Durango – Melchor Ocampo

== Guanajuato ==
- Abasolo, Guanajuato – Mariano Abasolo
- Álvaro Obregón – Álvaro Obregón
- Ciudad Manuel Doblado – Manuel Doblado, liberal politician, governor (1854–1858 and 1860–1861), Minister of Foreign Affairs (1861)
- Colonia Juan José Torres Landa – Juan José Torres Landa (1911 -1980), Governor of Guanajuato
- Comonfort – Ignacio Comonfort, President of Mexico
- Cortazar, Guanajuato – Luis Cortazar y Rabago
- Doctor Mora – José María Luis Mora Lamadrid, father of the Mexican liberalism
- Doctor Hernández Álvarez (San Felipe) - Enrique Hernández Álvarez (1892-1938), Governor of Guanajuato and Ministry of Health
- Dolores Hidalgo – Miguel Hidalgo
- Enrique Fernandez Martinez (León) - Enrique Fernandez Martinez (1896-1968), Governor of Guanajuato
- Jacinto López Moreno (León) - Jacinto López Moreno (1906-1971), founder of General Union of Workers and Peasants of Mexico
- Luis Donaldo Colosio (Celaya) - Luis Donaldo Colosio
- Ocampo, Guanajuato – Melchor Ocampo
- Purísima del Bustos – Hermenegildo Bustos, painter
- San Diego de la Unión – Didacus of Alcalá
- San Felipe, Guanajuato – King Philip II of Spain
- San Francisco del Rincón – Saint Francis
- San José Iturbide – Saint Joseph and Agustín de Iturbide, Emperor of Mexico (1822-1823)
- San Miguel de Allende – Saint Michael and Ignacio Allende
- Santa Catarina, Guanajuato – Catherine of Alexandria
- Santa Cruz de Juventino Rosas – Juventino Rosas, musician
- Santiago Maravatío – James the Great
- Villagrán, Guanajuato – Julián Villagran

== Guerrero ==
- Free and Sovereign State of Guerrero – Vicente Guerrero, independence leader and second President
- Acapulco de Juárez – Benito Juárez
- Alcozauca de Guerrero – Vicente Guerrero
- Atoyac de Álvarez – Juan Álvarez
- Buenavista de Cuéllar – General Rafael A. Cuellar, Governor
- Ciudad Altamirano, Guerrero – Ignacio Manuel Altamirano
- Chilpancingo de los Bravo – Leonardo Bravo (1764–1812), general during the independence movement, and his sons Nicolás Bravo (1786–1854), independence leader and 11th President; and Víctor Bravo, independence leader
- Coahuayutla de José María Izazaga – es:José María Izazaga, insurgent
- Coyuca de Benítez – María Faustina Benítez, wife of Juan Álvarez
- Coyuca de Catalán – Nicolás Catalán
- Eduardo Neri – Eduardo Neri Reynoso (1887–1973)
- Florencio Villarreal – Col. Florencio Villarreal, who drafted the Plan of Ayutla
- General Canuto A. Neri – Canuto A. Neri (1840-1895), a republican general
- General Heliodoro Castillo – a Zapatist general, Heliodoro Castillo Castro (1887-1917)
- Huitzuco de los Figueroa – named after the Figueroa family, such as Rubén Figueroa Figueroa, (1908–1991), governor of Guerrero, Ignacio Figueroa (1834–1873), liberal military, and Prof. Francisco Figueroa Mata (1870–1936), teacher and governor of Guerrero
- Ixcateopan de Cuauhtémoc – Cuauhtémoc
- José Joaquín de Herrera (municipality) – José Joaquín de Herrera, President
- Juan R. Escudero (municipality) – Juan Ranulfo Escudero (1890–1923), a trade unionist leader, worker and statesman
- La Unión de Isidoro Montes de Oca – Isidoro Montes de Oca, insurgent
- Leonardo Bravo (municipality) – General Leonardo Bravo, an Independence hero
- Mártir de Cuilapán – Vicente Guerrero Saldaña
- Pedro Ascencio Alquisiras – Pedro Ascencio Alquisiras, insurgent
- San Luis Acatlán – Louis IX of France
- San Marcos Municipality, Guerrero – Mark the Evangelist
- Taxco de Alarcón – Juan Ruiz de Alarcón, writer
- Tecpan de Galeana (municipality) – Hermenegildo Galeana
- Tepecoacuilco de Trujano – Valerio Trujano
- Tixtla de Guerrero (municipality) – Vicente Guerrero
- Tlapa de Comonfort – Ignacio Comonfort
- Tlalixtaquilla de Maldonado – Caritino Maldonado Pérez, Governor
- Zihuatanejo de Azueta – es:José Azueta (1895–1914), Artillery Tactical Lieutenant during the Battle of Veracruz of 1914
- Zirándaro de los Chávez – Rodolfo Chávez Sánchez (1895–1995) and Dr. Ignacio Chávez Sánchez

== Hidalgo ==
- Free and Sovereign State of Hidalgo – Miguel Hidalgo y Costilla, (1753–1811), leader of the Mexican independence movement
- Agua Blanca de Iturbide - Juan de Iturbide, Franciscan friar
- Cuautepec de Hinojosa – Pedro Hinojosa
- Emiliano Zapata, Hidalgo – Emiliano Zapata
- Fraccionamiento Jesús Ángeles Contreras (Pachuca) - Lic. Jesús Ángeles Contreras (1921-2006), rector of the Autonomous University of the State of Hidalgo
- Francisco I. Madero Municipality, Hidalgo – Francisco I. Madero, President
- Huasca de Ocampo, Tepeji del Río de Ocampo – Melchor Ocampo
- Huejutla de Reyes – Antonio Reyes Cabrera (1831–1866), local hero
- Javier Rojo Gómez (Hidalgo) – Javier Rojo Gómez, Governor of Hidalgo
- Manuel Ávila Camacho (Hidalgo) – Manuel Ávila Camacho, President
- Nicolás Flores, Hidalgo – General Nicolás Flores Rubio (1873–1933), governor of Hidalgo
- Omitlán de Juárez, Juárez, Hidalgo, Zapotlán de Juárez – Benito Juárez, President
- Pachuca de Soto – Manuel Fernando Soto (1825-1896), congressman and intellectual creator of the founding of the state of Hidalgo
- Progreso de Obregón – Álvaro Obregón, President
- San Agustín Tlaxiaca – Augustine of Hippo
- San Bartolo Tutotepec – Bartholomew the Apostle
- San Salvador, Hidalgo – Jesus
- Santiago de Anaya – James the Great and Pedro Maria Anaya, President
- Santiago Tulantepec - James the Great
- Tenango de Doria – Juan Cristodomo Doria, first governor
- Tepehuacán de Guerrero - Vicente Guerrero
- Tezontepec de Aldama – Juan Aldama
- Tula de Allende – Ignacio Allende
- Tulantepec de Lugo Guerrero – José Lugo Guerrero (1897–1980), Governor
- Zacualtipan de Ángeles – General Felipe Ángeles
- Zapotlán de Juárez – Benito Juárez

== Jalisco ==
- Acatlán de Juárez, Valle de Juárez – Benito Juárez
- Ahualulco de Mercado – José María Mercado
- Atemajac de Brizuela – Coronel Miguel Brizuela
- Autlán de Navarro – revolutionary Paulino Navarro (1892-1923)
- Bolaños, Jalisco – Toribio de Bolaños, conquistator
- Casimiro Castillo – peasant leader Casimiro Castillo Vigil (1883–1925)
- Cañadas de Obregón – Álvaro Obregón
- Ciudad Guzmán – es:Gordiano Guzmán (1789-1854), insurgent
- Cuautitlán de García Barragán – General Marcelino García Barragán (1895–1979), Governor of Jalisco
- Degollado – Santos Degollado
- Emiliano Zapata, Jalisco – Emiliano Zapata
- Encarnación de Díaz – Porfirio Díaz, Mexican dictator
- Gómez Farías, Jalisco – Valentín Gómez Farías
- Juan Gil Preciado (Jalisco) – Prof. Juan Gil Preciado (1909–1999), governor of Jalisco
- Lagos de Moreno – Pedro Moreno (soldier) (1775–1817), insurgent
- Lázaro Cárdenas, Jalisco – Lázaro Cárdenas
- Puerto Vallarta – Ignacio Luis Vallarta (Governor)
- San Cristóbal de la Barranca – Saint Christopher
- San Diego de Alejandría – Dr. Diego Aranda y Carpinteiro (1776-1853), bishop of Guadalajara
- San Ignacio Cerro Gordo – Ignatius of Loyola (1491–1556)
- San Juan de los Lagos – John the Baptist
- San Juanito de Escobedo – John the Apostle and Antonio Escobedo, governor (1844)
- San Julián, Jalisco – Julian of Antioch (d. c. AD 308)
- San Marcos, Jalisco – Mark the Evangelist
- San Martín de Bolaños – Martin of Braga (AD 520–580)
- San Martín de Hidalgo – Miguel Hidalgo
- San Miguel el Alto - Saint Michael
- San Sebastián del Oeste – Saint Sebastian (AD 256-288)
- Santa María de los Ángeles and Santa María del Oro, Jalisco – Mary
- Talpa de Allende – Ignacio Allende
- Teocuitatlán de Corona, Villa Corona – Ramón Corona
- Tepatitlán de Morelos – José María Morelos
- Tlajomulco de Zúñiga – General Eugenio Zúñiga (1884-1915), revolutionary general
- Valle de Juárez – Benito Juárez
- Villa Guerrero, Jalisco – Vicente Guerrero
- Villa Hidalgo, Jalisco – Miguel Hidalgo
- Yahualica de González Gallo – José González Gallo (Governor)
- Zapotitlán de Vadillo – Basilio Vadillo (1895–1935) (Governor)
- Zapotlán del Rey – King Philip II of Spain

== Mexico (state) ==
- Acolman de Nezahualcóyotl – Nezahualcoyotl (1402–1472), poet
- Almoloya de Alquisiras – Pedro Ascencio Alquisiras, an Independence hero
- Almoloya de Juárez, Amecameca de Juárez, Chicoloapan de Juárez and Chiconcuac de Juárez – Benito Juárez, President
- Apaxco de Ocampo – Melchor Ocampo, politician and philosopher
- Atizapán de Zaragoza – Ignacio Zaragoza
- Atlacomulco de Fabela, Tlazala de Fabela – Isidro Fabela, writer, politician and academician
- Chapa de Mota – conquistator Jeronimo Ruiz de la Mota
- Ciudad López Mateos – Adolfo López Mateos, President
- Ciudad Nezahualcóyotl – Nezahualcóyotl
- Coacalco de Berriozábal – Felipe Berriozábal, Governor of State of Mexico
- Donato Guerra, State of Mexico – Donato Guerra, Soldier
- Ecatepec de Morelos and Morelos, State of Mexico – José María Morelos
- Jilotepec de Molina Enríquez – Andrés Molina Enríquez
- Luvianos – Cristobal Luvianos (founder)
- Melchor Ocampo, State of Mexico – Melchor Ocampo
- Otumba de Gómez Farías – Valentín Gómez Farías
- Rayón, State of Mexico – Ignacio López Rayón, an Independence hero
- San Antonio la Isla – Anthony of Padua (1195–1231)
- San Felipe del Progreso – Philip the Apostle
- San José del Rincón – Saint Joseph
- San José Villa de Allende – Saint Joseph and Ignacio Allende, an Independence hero
- San Martín de las Pirámides – Martin of Braga
- San Mateo Atenco – Matthew the Apostle
- San Simón de Guerrero – Simon the Zealot and Vicente Guerrero, president (1839)
- Santo Tomás de los Plátanos – Thomas the Apostle
- Temascalcingo de José Maria Velasco – José María Velasco Gómez, painter
- Texcoco de Mora – José María Luis Mora (1794–1850), priest and liberal idealist
- Tlalnepantla de Baz – Dr. Gustavo Baz Prada, Revolutionary and governor
- Toluca de Lerdo – Sebastián Lerdo de Tejada, President
- Tultitlán de Mariano Escobedo – General Mariano Escobedo
- Valle de Bravo – Nicolás Bravo, President
- Villa Guerrero, State of Mexico – Vicente Guerrero, President
- Villa Victoria – Guadalupe Victoria, President

== Mexico City ==
=== Álvaro Obregón ===
- Álvaro Obregón, Mexico City – Álvaro Obregón, who was assassinated in that area in 1928
- Abraham M. González – Abraham González, former governor of Chihuahua (1912–1913)
- Alfonso XIII – Alfonso XIII, king of Spain (1886–1931)
- Francisco Villa – Pancho Villa, leader of División del Norte (1913–1920)
- Galeana – Hermenegildo Galeana, (1762–1814), hero of the Mexican War of Independence
- Hidalgo and Miguel Hidalgo – Miguel Hidalgo y Costilla (1753–1811), Father of the Nation
- José María Pino Suárez – José María Pino Suárez, (1869–1913), Vice President of Mexico (1911–1913)
- Margarita Masa de Juárez – Margarita Maza (1826–1871), First Lady of Mexico (1858–1864 and 1867–1871)
- Mártires de Tacubaya – The soldiers and civilians who were shot as a result of their defeat in the Battle of Tacubaya on April 11, 1859.
- Merced Gómez – Merced Gomez, Sr., bullfighter (1884–1923)
- Ponciano Arriaga – José Ponciano Arriaga Mejía (1811–1865), lawyer and radical liberal politician
- Reacomodo Valentín Gómez Farías – Valentín Gómez Farías, five-time President of Mexico (1830s, 1846–1847)

=== Azcapotzalco ===
- U. H. Francisco Villa – Pancho Villa
- U. H. Lázaro Cárdenas – Lázaro Cárdenas, President of Mexico (1934–1940)
- U. H. Lerdo de Tejada – Sebastián Lerdo de Tejada, President of Mexico (1872–1876)
- U. H. Miguel Hidalgo – Miguel Hidalgo
- U. H. Rosendo Salazar – Rosendo Salazar Álamo (1888–1971), journalist and writer, promoter of organized labor

=== Benito Juárez ===
- Benito Juárez, Mexico City – Benito Pablo Juárez García, President of Mexico (1858–1872)
- General Pedro María Anaya – Pedro María de Anaya, general and twice-president (1847 and 1848)
- Josefa Ortiz de Domínguez – Josefa Ortiz de Domínguez ″La Corregidora″, (1768–1829), hero of the Mexican War of Independence
- Merced Gómez – Merced Gomez, Sr.
- Miguel Alemán – Miguel Alemán Valdés or his father Miguel Alemán González (1884–1929), general in the Mexican Revolution
- Niños Héroes – Niños Héroes: Juan de la Barrera, Juan Escutia, Francisco Márquez, Agustín Melgar, Fernando Montes de Oca, and Vicente Suárez, cadets who died at the Battle of Chapultepec in 1847

=== Coyoacán ===
- Adolfo Ruiz Cortines – Adolfo Ruiz Cortines, President (1952–1958)
- Emiliano Zapata – Emiliano Zapata Salazar (1879–1919), leader of the Liberation Army of the South
- Espartaco – Spartacus (c. 111–71 BC), gladiator who led a slave rebellion against the Roman Republic (73–71 BC)
- Nueva Díaz Ordaz – Gustavo Díaz Ordaz, President (1964–1970)

=== Cuajimalpa ===
- Cuajimalpa de Morelos – José María Teclo Morelos Pérez y Pavón (1765–1815), leader of Mexican War of Independence
- Adolfo López Mateos – Adolfo López Mateos, President (1958–1964)

=== Cuauhtémoc ===
- Cuauhtémoc, Mexico City – Cuauhtémoc, Tlatoani of Tenochtitlan (1520–1521)
- Condesa – María Magdalena Dávalos de Bracamontes y Orozco, Countess of Miravalle (1701–1777)
- Colonia Doctores – Dr. Lavista and Dr. Río de la Loza
- Colonia Guerrero – Vicente Ramón Guerrero Saldaña, Independence leader and 2nd President (1829)
- Colonia Juárez, Mexico City – Benito Juárez
- Colonia Maza – José Maza, owner of La Vaquita Ranch
- Colonia Morelos – José María Morelos
- Colonia Paulino Navarro – Paulino Navarro, soldier in the Mexican Revolution

=== Gustavo A. Madero ===
- Gustavo A. Madero, Mexico City – Gustavo Adolfo Madero González (1875–1913), Francisco I. Madero's brother

=== Miguel Hidalgo ===
- Miguel Hidalgo, Mexico City – Miguel Hidalgo

=== Venustiano Carranza ===
- Venustiano Carranza, Mexico City – Venustiano Carranza, leader of the Constitutional Army during the Revolution, Head of State (1914–1916) and President of Mexico (1916–1920)
- Colonia Valle Gómez – Modesto del Valle and Rafael B. Gomez, real estate developers (1890s)

== Michoacán ==
- Free and Sovereign State of Michoacán de Ocampo – Melchor Ocampo, liberal politician
- Álvaro Obregón Municipality – President Álvaro Obregón
- Arteaga, Michoacán – José María Arteaga, 19th century national hero
- Coalcomán de Vázquez Pallares – Natalio Vázquez Pallares (1913–1981), Mexican lawyer
- Cojumatlán de Régules – Nicolás de Régules, a general who fought against the French intervention in Mexico
- Carácuaro de Morelos – José María Morelos
- Ciudad Hidalgo, Michoacán – Miguel Hidalgo
- Epitacio Huerta – General Epitacio Huerta (1827–1904)
- Gabriel Zamora – Gabriel Zamora (1897–1933), Farm work and civil rights activist
- Jiménez, Michoacán – Mariano Jiménez, twice governor of Michoacán
- Juárez Municipality, Michoacán – Benito Juárez, President
- Lázaro Cárdenas, Michoacán – Lázaro Cárdenas, President
- Marcos Castellanos – Father Marcos Castellanos, an Independence hero
- Morelia – José María Morelos
- Múgica Municipality – Francisco J. Múgica (1884–1954)
- Ocampo Municipality – Melchor Ocampo
- Paracho de Verduzco – José Sixto Verduzco, an Independence hero
- Pastor Ortiz – Pastor Ortiz Avila (1902–1930)
- Quiroga, Michoacán – Vasco de Quiroga, Bishop of Michoacan
- San Juan Huetamo de Núñez – Saint John the Baptist and José Silverio Núñez (1802-1858), hero of the Reform war
- Jacona de Plancarte – Francisco Plancarte y Navarrete (1856–1920), archbishop born in Zamora, Michoacán
- Jiménez, Michoacán – Mariano Jiménez, governor of Michoacán (1885–1892)
- Lázaro Cárdenas, Michoacán – Lázaro Cárdenas del Río, president (1934–1940)
- Santa Ana Maya – Saint Anne
- Santa Clara del Cobre (a.k.a. Salvador Escalante) – Clare of Assisi and General Salvador Escalante Pérez Gil, Revolutionary leader
- San Lucas Municipality, Michoacán – Saint Luke
- Tiquicheo de Nicolás Romero – Nicolás Romero, liberal general during the Reform War
- Venustiano Carranza, Michoacán – José Venustiano Carranza De La Garza, president (1916–1920)
- Villa Madero – Francisco I. Madero, president (1911–1913)
- Villa Victoria – Guadalupe Victoria, first president (1824–1829)
- Villamar Municipality – Eligio Villamar, hero of the Mexican–American War.
- Vista Hermosa de Negrete – José María Martínez Negrete, landowner and benefactor
- Zamora de Hidalgo – Miguel Hidalgo

== Morelos ==
State

- Morelos – José María Morelos (1765–1815), priest and independence leader

Municipalities and municipal seats

- Ciudad Ayala – Francisco Ayala (1760–1812), independence leader
- Emiliano Zapata, Morelos (previously called San Francisco Zacualpan and San Vicente Zacualpan) – Emiliano Zapata (1879–1919), revolutionary general (Francis of Assisi (1182–1226) and Saint Vincent)
- Santo Domingo Hueyapan – Saint Dominic
- Jantetelco de Matamoros – Mariano Matamoros (1770–1814), priest and independence leader
- Jojutla de Juárez – Benito Juárez (1806–1872), president (1858–1872)
- Jonacatepec de Leondro Valle – Leandro Valle Martínez (1833–1861), general and liberal politician
- Tlaltizapán de Zapata – Emiliano Zapata
- Totolapan de Montes de Oca – Fernando de Montes de Oca (c. 1830–1847), one of the Niños Héroes
- Yautepec de Zaragoza – Ignacio Zaragoza (1829–1862), led the defense in the Battle of Puebla (1862)
- Zacatepec of Hidalgo – Miguel Hidalgo y Costilla (1753–1811), priest and Father of the Nation

Colonies, neighborhoods, and towns

- Adolfo Ruiz Cortines, Cuernavaca – Adolfo Ruiz Cortines (1889–1973), president (1952–1958) PRI
- Amatlán de Quetzalcóatl, Tepoztlán – Quetzalcoatl, prehispanic god
- Antonio Barona, Cuernavaca – es:Antonio Barona Rojas (1886–1915), revolutionary general
- Ángel Bocanegra, Tepoztlán – José María Bocanegra, third president (December 1829)
- Alfredo V. Bonfil, Tlaquiltenango; and Alfredo V. Bonfil, Yautepec – es:Alfredo V. Bonfil (1936–1973), politician and peasant leader
- Benito Juárez, Cuernavaca – Benito Juárez
- Diego Ruiz, Zapata – General Diego Ruiz, who was killed in a battle in 1915
- Dr. José G. Parres, Jiutepec – José G. Parres (1888–1949), politician
- Emiliano Zapata, Zacualpan – Emiliano Zapata
- Felipe Neri, Tlalnepantla – Felipe Neri (1884–1914), revolutionary general
- Gloria Almada de Bejarano, Cuernavaca – es:Gloria Bejarano Almada (b. 1952), Costa Rican politician and First Lady of Costa Rica (1990–1994)
- Guadalupe Victoria, Zacualpan – Guadalupe Victoria (1786–1843), first president (1824–1829)
- López Mateos, Cuautla and Adolfo López Mateos, Cuernavaca – Adolfo López Mateos (1909–1969), president (1958–1964) PRI
- José López Portillo, Cuernavaca – José López Portillo (1920–2004), president (1976–1982) PRI
- Juan Morales, Yecapixtla – Juan Esteban Morales, general who led the defense during the Battle of Veracruz in 1914
- Margarita Maza de Juárez, Cuernavaca – Margarita Maza (1826–1871), First Lady of Mexico (1858–1864 and 1867–1871)
- Mariano Escobedo, Zacualpan – Mariano Escobedo (1826–1902), liberal general
- Narciso Mendoza and Niño Artillero, Cuautla – es:Narciso Mendoza (1800–1888), eleven-year-old soldier during the Siege of Cuautla
- Otilio Montaño, Cuautla, and Otilio Montaño, Jiutepec – Otilio Montaño Sánchez (1887–1917), revolutionary general
- Paraíso Montessori, Cuernavaca – Maria Montessori (1870–1952), Italian educator
- Rancho Cortes – Hernán Cortés (1485–1547), Spanish conquistador and 1st Marquess of the Valley of Oaxaca
- Ricardo Flores Magón, Cuernavaca – Ricardo Flores Magón (1874–1922), anarchist and social reformer
- Rodolfo López de Nava, Cuernavaca – Rodolfo López de Nava, Governor of Morelos (1952–1958)
- Rubén Jaramillo, Temixco – Rubén Jaramillo (1900–1962), peasant leader
- San Antón Analco, Cuernavaca – Anthony of Padua (1195–1231), Franciscan priest and friar
- San Lorenzo Chamilpa, Cuernavaca – Saint Lawrence (AD 225-258)
- San Nicolás Galeana, Zacatepec – Hermenegildo Galeana (1762–1814), independence leader
- Santa María Ahuacatitlán – Mary
- Shaya Michan, Xoxocotla – Shaya Michan, naturalist doctor
- Tres Marias, Huitzilac – The Three Marys present at the Crucifixion
- Valle de Vázquez and Lorenzo Vázquez, Tlalnepantla – es:Lorenzo Vázquez Herrera (1879–1917), revolutionary general
- Vicente Estrada Cajigal, Cuernavaca – Vicente Estrada Cajigal, first modern governor (1930–1932)
- Vicente Guerrero, Cuernavaca – Vicente Guerrero (1782–1831), independence leader and second president (1829)
- Villa Nicolás Zapata, Totolapan – es:Nicolás Zapata Aguilar (1906–1979), politician PRI

Other

- Benito Juárez, Xochitepec – Benito Juárez
- Cliserio Alanís, San Gaspar, Jiutepec – Cliserio Alanís, revolutionary general; Caspar, one of the Three Kings
- Estadio Agustín "Coruco" Díaz – Agustín "Coruco" Díaz (1935–1960), soccer player
- Estadio Isidro Gil Tapia – Isidro Gil Tapia, soccer player
- Estadio Mariano Matamoros – Mariano Matamoros
- Francisco Villa, Xochitepec – Pancho Villa (1878–1923), general, leader of División del Norte
- General Mariano Matamoros Airport – Mariano Matamoros
- Borda Garden, Cuernavaca – José de la Borda (c. 1699–1778), a miner in Taxco, New Spain
- La Hacienda de San Gabriel Las Palmas, Amacuzac – Archangel Gabriel
- La hacienda de Santa Lucía, Temoac – Saint Lucy
- Melchor Ocampo park, Cuernavaca – Melchor Ocampo (1814–1861), liberal politician
- Miguel Hidalgo, Xochitepec – Miguel Hidalgo y Costilla
- Nueva Morelos, Xochitepec – José María Morelos
- San José Vista Hermosa (ex-hacienda), Jojutla – Saint Joseph
- Siqueiros park, Cuernavaca – David Alfaro Siqueiros (1896–1974), muralist
- Unidad Deportiva Fidel Velázquez, Cuernavaca – Fidel Velázquez Sánchez (1900–1997), union leader

== Nayarit ==
- Amado Nervo (Nayarit) - Amado Nervo, poet
- El Nayar – Tribal chief, Nayar
- Felipe Carrillo Puerto (Nayarit) - Felipe Carrillo Puerto
- Guadalupe Victoria (Nayarit) - Guadalupe Victoria
- Juan Escutia (Nayarit) - Juan Escutia (1822-1847), one of the Niños Héroes
- Ruiz, Nayarit – Mariano Ruiz Montañez (1846–1932), last political leader of the Porfiriato and of arms of the territory of Tepic (Nayarit)
- Salvador Allende (Nayarit) – Dr. Salvador Allende, Chilean president who visited in Mexico in 1972
- San Blas, Nayarit – Saint Blaise
- San Pedro Lagunillas – Saint Peter and Pedro Alonso Dávalos Bracamonte y Uibarri (1645-1711), I Count of Miravalle
- Santa María del Oro, Nayarit – Mary
- Santiago Ixcuintla – James the Great (died AD 44)
- Villa Hidalgo (Nayarit) – Miguel Hidalgo y Costilla (1753-1811), Father of the Nation
- Villa Juárez, Nayarit – Benito Juárez, liberal president (1858-1872)

== Nuevo León ==
- Abasolo, Nuevo León – Mariano Abasolo
- Alfredo V. Bonfil (Paras) – Alfredo Vladimir Bonfil (1936–1973), a peasant leader
- Allende, Nuevo León – Ignacio Allende
- Aquiles Serdán (Vallecillo) – Aquiles Serdán, revolutionary
- Aramberri, Nuevo León – José Silvestre Aramberri
- Cadereyta Jiménez, Nuevo León – José Mariano Jiménez
- Bustamante, Nuevo León – Anastasio Bustamante
- Cerralvo Municipality – Rodrigo Pacheco, 3rd Marquess of Cerralvo
- Ciénega de Flores – Don Pedro Flores
- Congregación Calles – Plutarco Elías Calles
- Doctor Arroyo – Dr. José Francisco Arroyo y Anda
- Doctor Coss – José María Cos, politician
- Doctor González, Nuevo León – José Eleuterio González, Governor and founder of the UANL
- Galeana, Nuevo León – Hermenegildo Galeana (1762–1814), a hero of the Mexican War of Independence
- García, Nuevo León – Joaquín García (Governor)
- General Bravo – Nicolás Bravo (1786–1854), 11th President of Mexico and hero of the War of Independence and the Mexican–American War
- General Escobedo – Mariano Escobedo
- General Treviño – Jerónimo Treviño (1835–1914)
- General Zaragoza – Ignacio Zaragoza (1829–1862), Mexican military commander of the 19th century
- General Zuazua – Juan Zuazua Esparza, who fought in the Reform War
- Hidalgo and Sabinas Hidalgo – Miguel Hidalgo
- Iturbide, Nuevo León – Agustín de Iturbide
- Juárez, Nuevo León – Benito Juárez
- Lampazos de Naranjo, Nuevo León – Francisco Naranjo
- Los Aldamas – Brothers Juan Aldama and Ignacio Aldama, heroes of the Mexican War of Independence
- Los Herreras – Brothers Herrera, heroes of the battle of the bridge of San Bernabe during the War of Independence
- Melchor Ocampo – Melchor Ocampo, liberal thinker and diplomat
- Mier y Noriega – Fray José Servando Teresa de Mier Noriega y Guerra (1765–1827), priest who helped draft the Mexican Constitution of 1824
- Monterrey – Gaspar de Zúñiga, 5th Count of Monterrey
- Morones Prieto (Nuevo León) – Dr. Ignacio Morones Prieto (1899–1974), physician and governor
- Predio Alfonso Martínez Domínguez (Nuevo Leon) - Alfonso Martínez Domínguez, governor
- Salinas Victoria – Guadalupe Victoria, first president (1824-1829)
- San Pedro Garza García – St. Peter and Genaro Garza García (1837–1904), governor
- San Nicolás de los Garza – Saint Nicholas of Myra and Pedro de la Garza, benefactor of the town
- Santa Catarina – Catherine of Alexandria
- Santiago – Saint James the Greater

== Oaxaca ==
- Acatlán de Pérez Figueroa – Luis Pérez Figueroa
- Ánimas Trujano, Oaxaca – Valerio Trujano
- Ayoquezco de Aldama – Juan Aldama
- Capulalpam de Méndez – Miguel Méndez Hernández, initiator of Mexican Liberal Party
- Chiquihuitlán de Benito Juárez – Benito Juárez
- Cuilapan de Guerrero – Vicente Guerrero, who was executed here in 1831
- Ejutla de Crespo – Manuel Sabino Crespo (executed 1815), who fought with Morelos during the War of Independence
- Eloxochitlán de Flores Magón – Ricardo Flores Magón
- Evangelista Analco – A woman named Ana who founded the town in 1660
- Guadalupe de Ramírez – Francisco M. Ramírez (1867-1955), judge
- Guevea de Humboldt – Alexander von Humboldt (1769–1859), Prussian naturalist and explorer who visited the town
- Gustavo Díaz Ordaz (Oaxaca) – Gustavo Díaz Ordaz
- Huajuapan de León – Antonio de León, who fought in the War of Independence
- Huautla de Jiménez – General Mariano Jiménez, first governor of the state of Oaxaca (1884) and founder of the town
- Ixtlán de Juárez – Benito Juárez, who was baptized in the church of St Thomas in Ixtlán
- Juchitán de Zaragoza – Ignacio Zaragoza
- La Compañía – Named for the Jesuits
- Mariscala de Juárez – Benito Juárez, originally called Mariscala de Iturbide in honor of Agustín de Iturbide
- Mártires de Tacubaya – Liberal soldiers and civilians who were executed after the Battle of Tacubaya (1859)
- María Lombardo de Caso (Oaxaca) – María Lombardo de Caso (1905–1964), a Mexican narrator
- Matías Romero, Oaxaca – Matías Romero, politician and diplomat
- Miahuatlán de Porfirio Díaz, Santa María Chilapa de Diaz – Porfirio Díaz, seven-time President (1877–1880 and 1884–1911)
- Municipality of Guelatao de Juárez – Benito Juárez, who was born there in 1806
- Nejapa de Madero – Francisco I. Madero
- Oaxaca de Juárez – Benito Juárez
- Ocotlán de Morelos – José María Morelos
- Putla Villa de Guerrero – Vicente Guerrero
- Rojas de Cuauhtémoc – Cuauhtémoc
- San Agustín Amatengo and seven other municipalities named San Agustín – Augustine of Hippo (354–430), bishop, theologian and father of the Latin Catholic Church.
- San Andrés Cabecera Nueva and 14 other municipalities named San Andrés – Andrew the Apostle
- San Antonino Castillo Velasco – Anthony of Padua and José María Castillo Velasco, who was born here in 1820 and who played important roles in the Reform War and French intervention in Mexico
- San Antonino El Alto and seven other municipalities named San Antonino – Saint Anthony of Padua
- San Baltazar Chichicapam and two other municipalities named San Baltazar – Balthazar, one of the biblical Magi (Three Wise Men)
- San Bartolo Coyotepec and two other municipalities named San Bartolo – Bartholomew the Apostle
- San Bartolomé Ayautla and four other municipalities named San Bartolomé – Bartholomew the Apostle
- San Blas Atempa – Saint Blaise
- San Carlos Yautepec – Saint Charles
- San Cristóbal Amatlán and three other municipalities named San Cristóbal – Saint Christopher
- San Dionisio del Mar and three other municipalities named San Dionisio – Pope Dionysius (AD 259–268)
- San Esteban Atatlahuca – Saint Stephen (AD 5–34), first Christian martyr
- San Felipe Jalapa de Díaz – Philip the Apostle and Porfirio Díaz, president seven times (1877–1880 and 1884–1911)
- San Felipe Tejalapam and San Felipe Usila – Philip the Apostle
- San Francisco Cahuacúa and 15 other municipalities named San Francisco – Francis of Assisi, founder of the Franciscan Order
- San Ildefonso Amatlán, San Ildefonso Sola, and San Ildefonso Villa Alta – Saint Ildefonsus (AD 607–667), archbishop of Toledo, Spain
- San Jacinto Amilpas and San Jacinto Tlacotepec – Saint Hyacinth, a Roman martyr
- San Jerónimo Coatlán and five other municipalities named San Jerónimo – Saint Jerome (c. 345–420), priest who translated the Bible into Latin
- San Jorge Nuchita – Saint George (d. AD 303), soldier immortalized in the legend of Saint George and the Dragon
- San José Ayuquila and eight other municipalities named San José – Saint Joseph
- San Juan Achiutla and 40 other municipalities named San Juan – Saint John
- San Juan Bautista Atatlahuca and ten other municipalities named San Juan Bautista – John the Baptist
- San Lorenzo, Oaxaca and nine other municipalities named San Lorenzo – Saint Lawrence (AD 225–258), deacon of Rome
- San Lucas Camotlán, San Lucas Ojitlán, San Lucas Zoquiapam – Luke the Evangelist
- San Luis Amatlán – Saint Louis IX of France
- San Marcial Ozolotepec – es:Marcial de Limoges (d. AD 273), bishop of Roman Catholic Diocese of Limoges
- San Marcos Arteaga – Mark the Evangelist
- San Martín de los Cansecos and seven other municipalities named San Martín – Saint Martin of Braga (c. 520–580), archbishop of Bracara Augusta in Gallaecia
- San Mateo Cajonos and seven other municipalities named San Mateo – Matthew the Apostle
- San Melchor Betaza – Melchor, one of the Biblical Magi
- San Nicolás, Oaxaca and San Nicolás Hidalgo – Saint Nicholas and Miguel Hidalgo
- San Pablo Coatlán and eight other municipalities named San Pablo – Paul the Apostle
- San Pedro Amuzgos and 36 other municipalities named San Pedro – Saint Peter, apostle and first pope
- San Pedro y San Pablo Ayutla, San Pedro y San Pablo Teposcolula, San Pedro y San Pablo Tequixtepec – Saints Peter and Paul
- San Raymundo Jalpan – Raymond of Fitero, monk and founder of the Order of Calatrava
- San Sebastián Abasolo and seven other municipalities named San Sebastián – Saint Sebastian, early martyr
- San Simón Almolongas and San Simón Zahuatlán – Simon the Zealot
- Santa Ana, Oaxaca and seven other municipalities named Santa Ana – Saint Anne, grandmother of Jesus
- Santa Catalina Quierí and seven other municipalities named Santa Catalina – Catherine of Alexandria, virgin and martyr
- Santa Gertrudis Municipality – Gertrude the Great (1256–1302), Benedictine nun and theologian
- Santa Inés del Monte and Santa Inés Yatzeche – Agnes of Rome (AD 291–304), virgin and martyr
- Santa Inés de Zaragoza – Ignacio Zaragoza (1829–1862), Mexican military commander of the 19th century
- Santa Lucía del Camino and three other municipalities named Santa Lucía – Saint Lucy of Syracuse (AD 283–304)
- Santa Magdalena Jicotlán – Mary Magdalene
- Santa María Alotepec and 52 other municipalities named Santa María – Mary, mother of Jesus
- Santa María Jalapa del Marqués – Hernán Cortés (1485–1547), 1st Marquess of the Valley of Oaxaca
- Santa María Chilapa de Diaz – Mary (Mother of Jesus) and Porfirio Diaz
- Santiago Amoltepec and 52 other municipalities named Santiago – James the Great, apostle and patron of Spain
- Santo Domingo Albarradas and 19 other municipalities named Santo Domingo – Saint Dominic (1170–1221), founder of the Dominican Order
- Santos Reyes Nopala and four other municipalities named Santos Reyes – the Three Kings
- Santo Tomás Jalieza and three other municipalities named Santo Tomás – Thomas the Apostle
- San Vicente Coatlán, San Vicente Lachixío, San Vicente Nuñú – Vincent of Saragossa (d. c. AD 304), deacon and martyr
- Tataltepec de Valdés – Antonio Valdés (d. 1811), soldier in the War of Independence who was born in the town
- Teococuilco de Marcos Pérez – Marcos Pérez
- Teotitlán de Flores Magón – Ricardo Flores Magón and Enrique Flores Magón
- Tepelmeme Villa de Morelos – José María Morelos
- Tlacolula de Matamoros – Mariano Matamoros (1770–1814), priest and general in the War of Independence
- Totontepec Villa de Morelos – José María Morelos
- Unión Hidalgo – Miguel Hidalgo
- Villa Díaz Ordaz – José María Díaz Ordaz, politician
- Villa de Tututepec de Melchor Ocampo – Melchor Ocampo (1814–1861), radical liberal and diplomat (McLane–Ocampo Treaty)
- Yutanduchi de Guerrero – Vicente Guerrero
- Zimatlán de Álvarez – Juan Álvarez, caudillo who fought in the War of Independence and the Pastry War, liberal president (1855)

== Puebla ==
- Acatlán de Osorio – Joaquín Osorio
- Acatzingo de Hidalgo – Miguel Hidalgo y Costilla (1753–1811), initiator of the Mexican War of Independence
- Albino Zertuche and Acaxtlahuacán de Albino Zertuche – Albino Zertuche
- Ayotoxco de Guerrero, Totoltepec de Guerrero, Vicente Guerrero, Puebla – Vicente Guerrero (1782–1831), leader of the Mexican War of Independence and 2nd president (1829)
- Cañada Morelos Municipality and Morelos Cañada – José María Morelos (1765–1815), leader of the Mexican War of Independence
- Carmen Serdán – Carmen Serdán, a Mexican Revolutionary heroine
- Ciudad Serdán – Aquiles Serdán leader of the Mexican Revolution
- Cuapiaxtla de Madero – Francisco I. Madero (1873–1913), initiator of the Mexican Revolution and president (1911-1913)
- Domingo Arenas – Revolutionary Domingo Arenas (1888–1916)
- Emilio Portes Gil (Puebla) – Emilio Portes Gil, President of Mexico (1928–1930)
- Francisco Z. Mena – Francisco Zacarias Mena (1841–1908), general
- General Felipe Ángeles – Felipe Ángeles (1868–1919), Revolutionary general
- Guadalupe Victoria, Puebla – Guadalupe Victoria (1786–1843), general and first president (1824–1829)
- Hermenegildo Galeana, Puebla, Tuzamapan de Galeana – Hermenegildo Galeana (1762–1814), general in the War of Independence
- Honey, Puebla - Richard Honey (1829–1913), British businessman who was a director of the Mexican National Railroad company
- Huitzilan de Serdán – Aquiles Serdán (1876–1910), Maderista Mexican politician and revolutionary from Puebla who took part in the first action of the Mexican Revolution
- Izúcar de Matamoros (municipality) – Mariano Matamoros (1770–1814), Lieutenant general who won the Battle of Izúcar in the War of Independence
- Juan C. Bonilla (municipality) – Juan Crisóstomo Bonilla
- Juan Galindo (municipality) – Juan Galindo (1840–1888), liberal coronel born in Cuacuila, Puebla, who led the Batalion of Huauchinango at the Battle of Puebla
- Juan N. Méndez (municipality), Zapotitlán de Méndez – Juan N. Méndez, liberal general, governor of Puebla (1863, 1867), Porfiriast, president (1876–1877)
- Rafael J. García – Rafael J. García (1821-1883), liberal politician
- Lafragua – José María Lafragua (1813–1875), liberal lawyer born in Puebla (city)
- La Magdalena Tlatlauquitepec – Mary Magdalene
- Nicolás Bravo (municipality), Palmar de Bravo, Xayacatlán de Bravo – Nicolás Bravo (1786–1854), general during the Mexican–American War and president (1839, 1842–1843, 1846)
- Puebla de Zaragoza – Ignacio Zaragoza (1829-1862), general who won the Battle of Puebla
- Rafael Lara Grajales – Rafael Lara Grajales, a revolutionary who was assassinated in 1933
- San Andrés Calpan, San Andrés Cholula (municipality) – Andrew the Apostle
- San Buenaventura Nealticán – Giovanni di Fidanza (1221–1274), medieval Franciscan, scholastic theologian and philosopher
- San Diego la Meza Tochimiltzingo – Didacus of Alcalá (d. 1463), missionary to the Canary Islands
- San Felipe Teotlalcingo, San Felipe Tepatlán – Philip the Apostle
- San Francisco Mixtla – Francis of Assisi, founder of the Franciscan Order
- San Gregorio Atzompa – Pope Gregory I
- San Jerónimo Tecuanipan, San Jerónimo Xayacatlán – Saint Jerome, translator of the Bible into Latin
- San José Acateno – Saint Joseph
- San Juan Epatlán and four other municipalities named San Juan – Saint John
- San Martín Atexcal, San Martín Texmelucan, San Martín Totoltepec – Martin of Braga
- San Matías Tlalancaleca – Saint Matthias (died c. AD 80)
- San Nicolás Buenos Aires – Saint Nicholas
- San Pablo Anicano – Paul the Apostle
- San Pedro Cholula, San Pedro Yeloixtlahuaca – Saint Peter
- San Salvador el Seco, San Salvador Huixcolotla, San Salvador Huixcolotla – Jesus
- San Sebastián Tlacotepec, San Sebastián Zinacatepec – Saint Sebastian (c. AD 256–288), Christian saint and martyr
- San Vicente Coyotepec – Vincent of Saragossa
- Santa Catarina Tlaltempan – Catherine of Siena (1347–1380), a lay member of the Dominican Order
- Santa Clara Huitziltepec, Santa Clara Ocoyucan – Clare of Assisi (1194–1253), founder of the Poor Clares
- Santa Inés Ahuatempan – Agnes of Rome
- Santa Isabel Cholula – Elizabeth, mother of John the Baptist
- Santa María Cohetzala, Santa María Coronango, Santa María Coyomeapan – Mary, mother of Jesus
- Santa Rita Tlahuapan – Rita of Cascia (1381–1457) Augustinian nun
- Santiago Atzitzihuacán, Santiago Miahuatlán – James the Great
- Santo Domingo Huehuetlán – Saint Dominic, founder of the Dominican Order
- Santo Tomás Hueyotlipan (municipality) – Thomas the Apostle
- Tepango de Rodriguez Municipality – Abelardo L. Rodríguez, president (1932–1934)
- Tepeyahualco de Cuauhtemoc – Cuauhtémoc, last Aztec ruler (tlatoani) of Tenochtitlan (1520–1521)
- Tetela de Ocampo (municipality) – Melchor Ocampo (1814–1861), liberal politician and diplomat
- Teteles de Avila Castillo – Manuel Avila Castillo (1860-1908), father of President Manuel Ávila Camacho (1940-1946)
- Tlacotepec de Benito Juárez, Los Reyes de Juárez, Mazapiltepec de Juárez, Xicotepec de Juárez –Benito Juárez, Liberal Party president (1858–1872)
- Venustiano Carranza Municipality, Puebla – Venustiano Carranza, president who was assassinated in Tlaxcalatongo, Puebla in 1920
- Villa Ávila Camacho– Rafael Ávila Camacho (1904–1975), Governor of Puebla
- Villa Lázaro Cárdenas – Lázaro Cárdenas, military and statesman
- Xochitlán de Vicente Suárez – Vicente Suárez (born in Puebla, Puebla, 1833), hero of Battle of Chapultepec (1847)

== Querétaro ==
- Amealco de Bonfil – Alfredo Vladimir Bonfil (1936–1973), a peasant leader
- Cadereyta de Montes – Lope Díez de Armendáriz, 1st Marquess of Cadreita and Ezequiel Montes, lawyer and politician
- Colón, Querétaro – Christopher Columbus
- Corregidora Municipality – Josefa Ortiz de Domínguez
- Ezequiel Montes, Querétaro – es:Ezequiel Montes Ledesma (1820–1883), politician and diplomat
- Jalpan de Serra – Fray Junípero Serra
- Landa de Matamoros – Mariano Matamoros
- Pedro Escobedo – Dr. Pedro Escobedo (1798–1844)
- San Joaquín Municipality, Querétaro – Joachim, grandfather of Jesus
- Santiago de Querétaro – James the Great
- San Juan del Río Municipality, Querétaro – Saint John

== Quintana Roo ==
- Benito Juárez, Quintana Roo – Benito Juárez
- Carlos A. Madrazo – Carlos A. Madrazo (1915–1969), Governor of Tabasco (1959–1964)
- Felipe Carrillo Puerto, Quintana Roo – Felipe Carrillo Puerto, socialist leader
- Javier Rojo Gómez – Javier Rojo Gómez (1896–1970), lawyer and politician
- José María Morelos, Quintana Roo, Puerto Morelos – José María Morelos, leader of the Mexican War of Independence
- Lázaro Cárdenas, Quintana Roo – Lázaro Cárdenas, president (1934–1940)
- Othón P. Blanco, Quintana Roo – Othón P. Blanco Núñez de Cáceres (1868–1959), founder of Chetumal

== San Luis Potosí ==
- Adolfo López Mateos – Adolfo López Mateos, President of Mexico (1958-1964)
- Ahualulco de Sonido 13 – Julián Carrillo (1875–1965), composer
- Armadillo de los Infante – Named for the Infante family, who owned the first printing business in the state
- Axtla de Terrazas – Alfredo M. Terrazas, revolutionary
- Cárdenas, San Luis Potosi – Luis de Cardenas (founder)
- Cerro de San Pedro – Saint Peter
- Ciudad Fernández – Zenón Fernández (1792–1833), general who supported a federal government
- Ildefonso Turrubiartes (San Luis Potosi) – General Ildefonso Turrubiartes (1890–1963)
- Mexquitic de Carmona – General Damian Carmona
- Moctezuma, San Luis Potosí – General José Esteban Moctezuma
- Rayón, San Luis Potosí – Ignacio López Rayón (1773–1832), leader during the War of Independence
- Real de Catorce – Named to honor 14 Spanish soldiers killed during the Chichimeca War (1550–90)
- Salinas de Hidalgo, Villa de Hidalgo, San Luis Potosí – Miguel Hidalgo
- San Ciro de Acosta – Saint Cyrus (d. c. AD 307), martyr and revolutionary Miguel Acosta (1891–1947)
- San Luis Potosí City – King Louis IX of France
- San Martín Chalchicuautla – Martin of Braga (AD 520–580)
- San Nicolás Tolentino – Saint Nicholas of Myra (c. AD 270–343), bishop
- San Vicente Tancuayalab – Vincent Ferrer (1350–1419), Valencian Dominican missionary and logician
- Santa Catarina, San Luis Potosí – Catherine of Siena (1347–1380), mystic, lay member of the Dominican Order
- Santa María del Río, San Luis Potosí, Villa de Guadalupe, San Luis Potosí – Mary, mother of Jesus
- Santo Domingo, San Luis Potosí – Saint Dominic (1170–1221), founder of the Dominican Order
- Soledad de Graciano Sánchez – Prof. Graciano Sánchez Romo (1888–1957), a Mexican peasant and politician and founder of Peasant National Confederation
- Tancanhuitz de Santos – es:Pedro Antonio de los Santos Rivera (1887–1913), supporter of the Anti-Re-election Movement (1908–1909)
- Tanquián de Escobedo – Mariano Escobedo, governor
- Villa de Arista – Mariano Arista, republican and liberal president (1851–1853)
- Villa de Arriaga – Ponciano Arriaga (1811–1865), lawyer and radical liberal politician from San Luis Potosí
- Villa de Hidalgo, San Luis Potosí – Miguel Hidalgo y Costilla (1753–1811), Father of the Nation
- Villa Juárez, San Luis Potosí – Benito Juárez, liberal president (1858-1872)
- Zaragoza, San Luis Potosí – Ignacio Zaragoza, general at the Battle of Puebla (1862)

== Sinaloa ==
- Adolfo Ruiz Cortines (Sinaloa) – President Adolfo Ruiz Cortines
- Alfonso G. Calderón (Sinaloa) – Alfonso Calderón Velarde (1913–1990), Governor of Sinaloa
- Escuinapa de Hidalgo – Miguel Hidalgo
- Gabriel Leyva Solano, (Sinaloa) – Gabriel Leyva Solano (1871–1910), promartyr
- Juan José Ríos, Sinaloa – General Juan José Ríos (1882–1954), revolutionary
- Miguel Alemán (Sinaloa) – Miguel Alemán Valdés
- Salvador Alvarado – Salvador Alvarado, revolutionary
- San Ignacio Municipality, Sinaloa – Ignatius of Loyola (1491-1556), founder of the Society of Jesus
- Sinaloa de Leyva – Gabriel Leyva Solano

== Sonora ==
- Adolfo Oribe de Alva – Ing. Adolfo Orive Alba (1907–2000), Mexican engineer
- Alejandro Carrillo Marcor (Sonora) – Alejandro Carrillo Marcor (1908–1998), Governor of Sonora
- Benjamín Hill, Sonora – Benjamín G. Hill (1874–1920), military leader during the Mexican Revolution
- Cajeme Municipality – Cajemé (1835–1887), Yaqui indian rebel
- Campodónico (Sonora) – Rodolfo Campodónico, compositor
- Carbó – José Guillermo Carbó, military commander
- Ciudad Obregón – Álvaro Obregón, president (1920–1924)
- Emiliano Zapata (Sonora) – Emiliano Zapata (1879–1919), military leader during the Mexican Revolution
- Hermosillo – José María González Hermosillo
- Magdalena de Kino – Father Eusebio Kino (1645–1711), Jesuit, missionary and explorer
- Miguel Alemán (Sonora) – Miguel Alemán Valdés, president (1946–1952)
- Moctezuma, Sonora – Moctezuma Xocoyotzin (1466–1520), ninth tlatoani (ruler) of the Aztec Empire (1502 or 1503–1520)
- Nacozari de García – Jesús García (1881–1907), railroad brakeman from the Moctezuma Copper Company who died while preventing a train loaded with dynamite from exploding near Nacozari
- Plutarco Elías Calles, Sonora – Plutarco Elías Calles, president (1924–1928)
- Rayón, Sonora – Ignacio López Rayón (1773–1832), general during the Mexican War of Independence
- San Felipe de Jesús Municipality – Philip of Jesus (1572–1597), priest and martyr, first Mexican saint
- San Ignacio Río Muerto Municipality – Ignacio Soto, Governor of Sonora
- San Javier Municipality, Sonora – Francis Xavier (1506–1552), co-founder of the Society of Jesus
- San Luis Río Colorado Municipality – Louis IX of France
- San Pedro de la Cueva Municipality – Saint Peter
- Santa Ana Municipality, Sonora – Saint Anne, grandmother of Jesus
- Villa Hidalgo, Sonora – Miguel Hidalgo y Costilla (1753–1811), Father of the Nation
- Villa Juárez, Sonora – Benito Pablo Juárez García (1806-1872), liberal president during the Reform War and Second French intervention in Mexico
- Villa Pesqueira – Ignacio Pesqueira Garcia

== Tabasco ==
- Benito Juárez (Macuspana) – Benito Juárez, president (1858–1872)
- Cárdenas, Tabasco – José Eduardo de Cárdenas (1765–1821) priest, theologian, and politician
- Carlos A. Madrazo (Tabasco) – Carlos A. Madrazo (1915–1969), governor (1959–1964)
- Carlos Pellicer Cámara (Tabasco) - Carlos Pellicer Cámara, poet
- Carlos Rovirosa (Tulipán) – Carlos Rovirosa (1901–1930), an aviator pilot
- Ejido Gustavo Diaz Ordaz (Tabasco) – Gustavo Díaz Ordaz, president
- Emiliano Zapata Municipality, Tabasco – Emiliano Zapata, revolutionary general
- Francisco J. Santamaria (Jalapa) – Francisco Javier Santamaria (1886–1963), governor
- Jalpa de Méndez – Coronel Gregorio Mendez Magana, who fought against the Second French intervention in Mexico
- Luis Gil Pérez (Tabasco) – Professor Luis Gil Pérez (1871–1911)
- Sánchez Magallanes – Coronel Andrés Sánchez Magallanes, a leader in the French Intervention in Mexico
- Tenosique de Pino Suárez – José María Pino Suárez, Vice President of Mexico under Francisco I. Madero (1911–1913)
- Venustiano Carranza (Tabasco) – Venustiano Carranza, president (1916–1920)

== Tamaulipas ==
- Abasolo, Tamaulipas – Mariano Abasolo
- Aldama, Tamaulipas – Juan Aldama, leader of the Mexican War of Independence
- Antiguo Morelos Municipality, Nuevo Morelos, Tamaulipas – José María Morelos, leader of the Mexican War of Independence
- Bustamante Municipality – Anastasio Bustamante
- Ciudad Madero – Francisco I. Madero, initiator of the Mexican Revolution and president (1911–1913)
- Ciudad Mier – Servando Teresa de Mier (1765–1827), priest and politician during the Mexican War of Independence
- Ciudad Miguel Alemán – Miguel Alemán Valdés, president
- Ciudad Victoria – Guadalupe Victoria, first president
- Gómez Farías Municipality, Tamaulipas – Valentín Gómez Farías, president
- Gustavo Díaz Ordaz, Tamaulipas – Gustavo Díaz Ordaz, president (1964–1970)
- Hidalgo, Tamaulipas – Miguel Hidalgo y Castillo, initiator of the Mexican War of Independence
- Jiménez, Tamaulipas – Colonel Juan Nepomuceno Jiménez (b. 1787), leader of the Mexican War of Independence
- Mainero, Tamaulipas – General Guadalupe Mainero Juárez (1856–1901), governor
- Marte R. Gómez (Tamaulipas) – Ing. Marte R. Gómez (1896–1973), governor
- Matamoros, Tamaulipas – Mariano Matamoros, leader of the Mexican War of Independence
- Nueva Ciudad Guerrero – Vicente Guerrero, leader of the Mexican War of Independence
- Ocampo, Tamaulipas – Melchor Ocampo, liberal politician and diplomat
- San Carlos Municipality, Tamaulipas – Charles of Sezze (1613–1670), friar of the Franciscan Order
- San Fernando, Tamaulipas – Ferdinand III of Castile
- San Nicolás Municipality, Tamaulipas – Saint Nicholas, bishop
- Úrsulo Galván (Tamaulipas) – Úrsulo Galván Reyes (1893–1930)
- Xicoténcatl, Tamaulipas – Xicotencatl II (d. 1522), Tlacochcalcatl (prince) and warlord of Tizatlan, Tlaxcala

== Tlaxcala ==
- Acuamanala de Miguel Hidalgo – Miguel Hidalgo y Castillo, priest and initiator of the Mexican War of Independence
- Amaxac de Guerrero – Vicente Guerrero, general and leader of the Mexican War of Independence and 2nd president
- Benito Juárez Municipality, Tlaxcala – Benito Juárez, liberal president (1858–1872)
- Emiliano Zapata Municipality, Tlaxcala – Emiliano Zapata (d. 1919), general and leader of the Mexican Revolution
- Ixtacuixtla de Mariano Matamoros – Mariano Matamoros, priest and general of the Mexican War of Independence
- Lázaro Cárdenas Municipality, Tlaxcala, Sanctorum de Lázaro Cárdenas – Lázaro Cárdenas, president (1934–1940)
- La Magdalena Tlaltelulco – Mary Magdalene
- Mazatecochco de José María Morelos – José María Morelos, priest and general of the Mexican War of Independence
- Muñoz de Domingo Arenas – Daniel Muñoz (d.1982), owner of Zacatepec Estate and Domingo Arenas (1888–1918), revolutionary from the state of Tlaxcala
- Nanacamilpa de Mariano Arista – Mariano Arista (1802–1855), soldier and president (1851–1853)
- Papalotla de Xicohténcatl, Tlaxcala de Xicohténcatl – Xicotencatl I (1425–1522), tlatoani (king) of Tizatlan, confederacy of Tlaxcala
- San Damián Texoloc – Saint Damian (died c. AD 287) Arab physician Christian martyr
- San Francisco Tetlanohcan – Francis of Assisi
- San Jerónimo Zacualpan – Saint Jerome, translator of the Bible
- San Juan Huactzinco, San Juan Totolac – John the Apostle
- San Lorenzo Axocomanitla – Saint Lawrence
- San Lucas Tecopilco – Luke the Evangelist
- San Pablo del Monte – Paul the Apostle
- Santa Ana Chiautempan, Santa Ana Nopalucan – Saint Anne, grandmother of Jesus
- Santa Apolonia Teacalco – Saint Apollonia (d. AD 249)
- Santa Catarina Ayometla – Catherine of Siena, member of the Dominican Order
- Santa Isabel Xiloxoxtla – Saint Elizabeth, mother of John the Baptist
- Tepetitla de Lardizabal – Miguel de Lardizabal, statesman
- Zitlaltepec de Trinidad Sánchez Santos – Trinidad Sánchez Santos, politician

== Veracruz ==
- Alto Lucero de Gutiérrez Barrios – Fernando Gutiérrez Barrios (governor)
- Alvarado, Veracruz – Pedro de Alvarado
- Ángel R. Cabada – Ángel Rosario Cabada, agrarian leader
- Benito Juárez, Veracruz – Benito Juárez
- Camarón de Tejeda, Chicontepec de Tejeda – Adalberto Tejeda Olivares, Politician
- Camerino Z. Mendoza (municipality) – es:Camerino Z. Mendoza (1879–1913), general during the Mexican Revolution
- Carlos A. Carrillo, Veracruz – Carlos A. Carrillo (1855–1893), educator from Córdoba, Veracruz
- Carrillo Puerto (municipality) – Felipe Carrillo Puerto
- Cazones de Herrera – Gral. Vicente Herrera Hernandez (1874–1946)
- Chicontepec de Tejeda – Sebastián Lerdo de Tejada, liberal president (1872–1876)
- Chinampa de Gorostiza – Manuel Eduardo de Gorostiza
- Ciudad Cuauhtémoc, Veracruz – Cuauhtémoc (c. 1502–1525), last tlatoani (emperor or leader) of the Aztecs
- Cosautlán de Carvajal – Ángel Carvajal Bernal (Governor)
- Coscomatepec de Bravo – Nicolás Bravo, general and three-time president
- Emiliano Zapata Municipality, Veracruz – Emiliano Zapata
- Filomeno Mata – Filomeno Mata Rodríguez (1845–1911), educator
- Gutiérrez Zamora – Manuel Gutiérrez Zamora
- Hueyapan de Ocampo – Melchor Ocampo, liberal intellectual and diplomat
- Huiloapan de Cuauhtémoc – Cuauhtémoc, last emperor of the Aztecs
- Ignacio de la Llave (Municipality) – Ignacio de la Llave (governor)
- Ixhuatlán de Madero – Francisco I. Madero
- Jáltipan de Morelos – José María Morelos y Pavón (d. 1813), priest and general during the War of Independence
- Jesús Carranza, Veracruz – Jesús Carranza, father of Venustiano Carranza
- José Azueta, Veracruz – es:José Azueta, naval cadet who fought at the Battle of Veracruz in 1914
- José Cardel, Veracruz – José Cardel, founder of a sugar-cane mill in 1923
- Juan de la Luz Enriquez, Veracruz – 19th century governor Juan de la Luz Enríquez
- Juan Rodríguez Clara – Juan Rodríguez Clara
- Juchique de Ferrer – Jaume Ferrer, Majorcan sailor who explored the West African coast
- Landero y Coss – Francisco Landero y Coss (1828–1900), governor of Veracruz
- Lerdo de Tejada – Sebastián Lerdo de Tejada
- Magdalena Municipality, Veracruz – Mary Magdalene
- Manlio Fabio Altamirano, Veracruz – es:Manlio Fabio Altamirano Flores (1892–1936), radical politician born in Xalapa
- Marco Antonio Muñoz, Veracruz – Lic. Marco Antonio Muñoz Turnbull (1914–2001), governor of Veracruz
- Mariano Escobedo, Veracruz – Mariano Escobedo
- Minatitlán, Veracruz – Martín Javier Mina y Larrea
- Mixtla de Altamirano – Ignacio Manuel Altamirano
- Naolinco de Victoria – Guadalupe Victoria, first president
- Ozuluama de Mascareñas (municipality) – Colonel Francisco Esteban Mascareñas, who was born here and fought on the Liberal side in the Reform War
- Papantla de Serafin Olarte – Serafin Olarte, guerrilla leader during the War for Independence
- Platón Sánchez – Rafael Platón Sánchez (1831–1867), a native of the area who fought in the Battle of Puebla
- Poza Rica de Hidalgo – Miguel Hidalgo de Castillo, initiator of the War of Independence
- Progreso de Zaragoza – Ignacio Zaragoza (1829–1862), military commander at the Battle of Puebla
- Rafael Delgado, Veracruz – Rafael Delgado (author)
- Rafael Lucio – Rafael Lucio, doctor from Xalapa
- San Andrés Tenejapan, San Andrés Tuxtla – Andrew the Apostle
- San Juan Evangelista – John the Evangelist
- Sayula de Alemán – Miguel Alemán Valdés (1900–1983), president (1946–1952), born in Sayula
- Soledad de Doblado – Manuel Doblado, Minister of Foreign Affairs who signed a preliminary peace agreement in Soledad with representatives of England, Spain and France on February 19, 1862
- Tatahuicapan de Juárez – Benito Juarez
- Tempoal de Sánchez, Veracruz – Rafael Platón Sánchez (1831–1867), a native of the area who chaired the court martial that sentenced Emperor Maximilian to death by firing squad
- Tlacotepec de Mejía – José Antonio Mexía (1800-1839), general born in Xalapa who fought at the Anahuac Disturbances in Texas and against Santa Ana in the Battle of Tampico in 1835
- Túxpam de Rodríguez Cano – Enrique Rodríguez Cano (b. 1912 - d. 1955), native of Tuxpan who was the secretary to President Adolfo Ruiz Cortines
- Úrsulo Galván – es:Úrsulo Galván Reyes (1893–1930), agrarian leader and member of the Mexican Communist Party born in Tlacotepec de Mejía
- Xalapa-Enríquez – Juan de la Luz Enríquez, governor (1884–1892)
- Vega de Alatorre – es:Ignacio R. Alatorre, general during the Reform War
- Villa Aldama – Juan Aldama (1774–1811), captain during the War of Independence and participant in the Cry of Dolores in 1810
- Zaragoza, Veracruz – Ignacio Zaragoza (1829–1862), military commander at the Battle of Puebla
- Zontecomatlán de López y Fuentes – Gregorio López y Fuentes (b. 1897 in La Huasteca), writer and chronicler of the Mexican Revolution

== Yucatán ==
- Lázaro Cárdenas – Lázaro Cárdenas, president (1934–1940)
- Motul de Carrillo Puerto – Felipe Carrillo Puerto, governor (1922–1924)
- Quintana Roo Municipality – Andrés Quintana Roo (1787–1851), writer, leader of the Mexican War of Independence, liberal politician
- San Felipe Municipality, Yucatán – Philip the Apostle
- Santa Elena Municipality – Helena, mother of Constantine I (AD c. 247 – c. 330)
- Suma de Hidalgo – Miguel Hidalgo y Costilla (d. 1811), initiator of the War of Independence
- Tekax de Álvaro Obregón – Álvaro Obregón (1880–1928), president (1920–1924) and President-elect when he was assassinated in 1928

== Zacatecas ==
- Anacleto López – General Anacleto López (1894–1970), chief of military operations in Tepetongo
- Calera de Víctor Rosales – Víctor Rosales (1776–1817), one of the thirteen founding fathers of Mexico
- Cañitas de Felipe Pescador Municipality - Felipe Pescador Valles (1880-1929), General director of National Railways of Mexico
- Cuauhtémoc Municipality, Zacatecas – Cuauhtémoc (d. 1521), last emperor of Tenochtitlan
- El Plateado de Joaquín Amaro – Joaquín Amaro, revolutionary
- El Salvador – Jesus
- Florencia de Benito Juárez – Benito Juárez, president
- Genaro Codina – Genaro Codina, composer of the state anthem, "Marcha de Zacatecas"
- General Enrique Estrada – Enrique Estrada (1890–1942) was a general, politician, and Secretary of National Defense.
- General Francisco R. Murguía – Francisco R. Murguía (1873–1922), governor of Zacatecas
- General Juan José Ríos – Juan José Ríos (1882–1954), revolutionary
- General Pánfilo Natera – Pánfilo Natera (1882–1951), revolutionary
- Guadalupe Municipality, Zacatecas – Virgin Mary
- Jerez de García Salinas – Francisco García Salinas, governor born in Jerez (1829–1834)
- Juan Aldama, Zacatecas – Juan Aldama, a leader of the War of Independence
- Lázaro Cárdenas (Zacatecas) – Lázaro Cárdenas, president (1934–1940)
- Luis Moya, Zacatecas – es:Luis Moya Regis (1855–1911), revolutionary
- Miguel Alemán, Zacatecas – Miguel Alemán Valdés, president
- Miguel Auza Municipality – General Miguel Auza Arrenechea (1822–1892), who was born in Sombrerete and fought in the Reform War and at the 1863 Siege of Puebla
- Manuel Ávila Camacho – Manuel Ávila Camacho, president
- Matías Ramos – Matías Ramos Santos (1891–1962), Secretary of National Defense under Adolfo Ruiz Cortines
- Melchor Ocampo – Melchor Ocampo, liberal politician
- Morelos – Jose Maria Morelos y Pavon (d. 1813), a leader of the War of Independence
- Moyahua de Estrada – Enrique Estrada, revolutionary
- Presa Leobardo Reynoso – Leobardo Reynoso Gutierrez (1902–1993), Governor of Zacatecas
- San Cayatano – Saint Cajetan (1480–1547)
- San Pedro Piedra Gorda – Saint Peter
- Santa María de la Paz – Mary, mother of Jesus
- Teúl de González Ortega Municipality and Villa González Ortega – Jesús González Ortega (1822–1881), general who defended Puebla during the 1863 siege, governor of Zacatecas
- Trinidad García de la Cadena – José Trinidad García de la Cadena Varela (1823–1886), liberal general from Zacatecas who supported the Plan de la Noria in 1871
- Villa de Cos – Doctor José María Cos, born in Zacatecas in 1770
- Villa García, Zacatecas – Francisco García Salinas, governor
- Villa Hidalgo, Zacatecas – Miguel Hidalgo (d.1811)
