= Ozolotepec =

Ozolotepec may refer to:

== Geography ==
- Santo Domingo Ozolotepec, Oaxaca
- San Juan Ozolotepec, Oaxaca
- Santa María Ozolotepec, Oaxaca
- San Marcial Ozolotepec, Oaxaca

== Languages ==
- Ozolotepec Zapotec
