= Coatlán =

Coatlán may refer to a number of places and languages in Mexico:

== Geography ==
- Coatlán del Río, Morelos
- San Pablo Coatlán, Oaxaca
- San Sebastián Coatlán, Oaxaca
- San Vicente Coatlán, Oaxaca
- San Miguel Coatlán, Oaxaca
- San Jerónimo Coatlán, Oaxaca

== Languages ==
- Santo Domingo Coatlán Zapotec
- Coatlán Mixe, or Isthmus Mixe
