= Miahuatlán =

Miahuatlán may refer to:

== Places ==
=== Mexico ===
- Miahuatlán, Amacuzac
- Miahuatlán, Cunduacán
- Miahuatlán, Metztitlán
- Miahuatlán, Omealca

==== Oaxaca ====
- Miahuatlán District
- Miahuatlán de Porfirio Díaz
- Sierra de Miahuatlán, south-easternmost range in the Sierra Madre del Sur
- Santa Lucía Miahuatlán

==== Puebla ====
- Santiago Miahuatlán
- San José Miahuatlán

==== Veracruz ====
- Miahuatlán (Veracruz)

== Others ==
- Miahuatlán cotton rat (Sigmodon planifrons), a rodent species in the family Cricetidae
- Miahuatlán Zapotec, Zapotec language spoken in southern Oaxaca, Mexico.
