= Amatlán =

Amatlán or Amatlan may refer to:

- Amatlán de Cañas, town and municipality in the Mexican state of Nayarit
- Amatlán de los Reyes, town and municipality in the Mexican state of Veracruz
- Naranjos Amatlán, municipality in the Mexican state of Veracruz
- San Cristobal Amatlán, town and municipality in the Mexican state of Oaxaca
- San Ildefonso Amatlán, town and municipality in the Mexican state of Oaxaca
- San Luis Amatlán, town and municipality in the Mexican state of Oaxaca
- San Miguel Amatlán, town and municipality in the Mexican state of Oaxaca
- Santa Ana Amatlán, settlement in Buenavista, Michoacán, Mexico
