= San Pedro Mixtepec, Miahuatlán =

San Pedro Mixtepec
- Municipality and town
- Location in Mexico
- Coordinates: 16°16′N 96°17′W
- Country: Mexico
- State: Oaxaca
- Time zone: UTC-6 (Central Standard Time)

San Pedro Mixtepec is a town and municipality in the Miahuatlán District of Oaxaca in south-western Mexico. It is part of the Miahuatlán District in the south of the Sierra Sur Region.
