= Ayahualtempa =

Village in Guerrero, Mexico

- Village
- Location within Guerrero Location within Mexico
- Coordinates: 17.45778°N 99.03722°W
- Country: Mexico
- State: Guerrero
- Municipality: José Joaquín de Herrera
- Elevation: 1,714 m (5,623 ft)

Population (2020)
  - Total: 837
- Time zone: UTC-6 (CST)

Ayahualtempa is an indigenous village in the municipality of José Joaquín de Herrera, Guerrero, in south-western Mexico. It is located about 1.4 kilometres (0.87 mi) southwest of Hueycantenango. As of 2020, the population stands at 837 people. Most of the village is ethnically Nahua, an indigenous group. About 70% of the population speaks an indigenous language.

The village has attracted attention throughout Mexico and abroad for its community militia formed in response to cartel violence, which includes many legal minors.

== Community militia ==
Ayahualtempa is located in a remote part of the state of Guerrero, which has become a key corridor for the production and transit of various drugs, particularly heroin. For a number of years, Ayahualtempa maintained its own self-defense force (Spanish: autodefensa) in response to cartel violence, which is legal in the state of Guerrero, and permitted by the federal government of Mexico. As of September 2021, the militia comprises 96 adult men and about a dozen children.

The PBS NewsHour reports that the militia was formed in 2015, when, after decades of growing poppy plants used for heroin production, the villagers of Ayahualtempa decided to stop poppy production, and cut off ties with cartels and cartel-affiliated organizations.

In June 2019, the community militia's commander was killed, with the militia saying he was killed by a member of the gang known as Los Ardillos. Anticipating a possible violent event at their funeral, the militia publicly blamed the state and federal government for his death, and any subsequent violence. The militia contends that the federal government is partially to blame, noting the presence of a military checkpoint close to the site of the murder, and also blames the state government for claiming that any investigation into Los Ardillos is outside of its jurisdiction.

On November 1, 2019, another member of the community's militia was killed. On November 9, 2019, El Heraldo de México reported that a local politician belonging to MORENA was killed in the village.

In November 2019, in response to an increase in murders by the cartel in the region, Ayahualtempa began arming legal minors, some as young as 6 years old, as part of their community militia. Children younger than 12 are not armed with real guns, but still take part in parades and militia training, and some interviewed have stated that they only take up arms when the village is visited by members of the press. This has drawn mixed reactions, with The Washington Post questioning if it was merely a ploy to attract more attention from the government, and the Associated Press calling the usage of children "desperate attempts to attract the federal government’s help". The militia itself states that it is not simply a PR stunt, but that the additional attention to the village's plight is an added bonus. Additional criticism has come from Mexican president Andrés Manuel López Obrador and UNICEF. The state of Guerrero, in response, agreed to send a routine police patrol to the area, but it has been met with suspicion from some villagers, the militia remains active.

Ayahualtempa's community militia is not unique to the village, nor is the practice of incorporating minors into the militia. However, the militia of Ayahualtempa is unique in its openness regarding the usage of children.

As of September 2021, the village's militia maintains control of Ayahualtempa, though it does not control other local institutions the townspeople used to travel to, such as a farmers market and the local school.

== Geography ==
Ayahualtempa is located in a remote portion of the state of Guerrero, with the nearest sizable town being Chilapa de Álvarez. Approximately 5 kilometres (3.1 mi) from Ayahualtempa is the ghost village of El Paraiso de Tepila, whose entire population fled due to cartel violence.

== Demographics ==
Much of the village is ethnically Nahua, an indigenous group. About 80% of households have running water; in 2010, 31 households did not have piped running water, and 98 lacked drainage systems. 21 households lacked manmade flooring, and 65 households lacked toilets. As of 2010, 316 people in Ayahualtempa lacked access to healthcare.
