= Santo Domingo Ozolotepec =

Coordinates: 16.15°N 96.3167°W

- Municipality and town
- Interactive map of Santo Domingo Ozolotepec
- Country: Mexico
- State: Oaxaca
- Time zone: UTC-6 (Central Standard Time)

Santo Domingo Ozolotepec is a town and municipality in Oaxaca in south-western Mexico. The municipality covers an area of km^{2}. It is part of the Miahuatlán District in the south of the Sierra Sur Region.

As of 2005, the municipality had a total population of .

== History ==
Ozolotepec, or Ocelotepec, was a prehispanic city-state inhabited by Zapotec people. Its exact location is unclear, because there are now several towns called Ozolotepec in this region. The main god worshipped in Ozolotepec was Bezalao, who protected people from death and helped them in wars. He was invoked for agriculture and commerce. There was also a god of war called Cozichacozee, depicted with a bow and arrows. The vigañas (priests) maintained the temple which was home to all the idols and carried out animal and human sacrifices, the latter involving the victim's heart being torn out and placed on a stone altar. The victim's flesh was then eaten. The vigañas also accepted the bloodletting of the nobility.

Ozolotepec went to war with Miahuatlan before being conquered by Moctezuma II. It paid tribute to the Aztec Empire in gold dust, mantas, cochineal and war captives, and in return the Aztecs provided it with mantas, sandals and feathers, possibly due to its strategic location. Wars were also waged against nearby Mixe and Chontal settlements. Warfare mainly consisted of quick ambushes and raids, with the main goal being to take captives, who were either made slaves, sacrificed and eaten, or sent to the Aztecs to be sacrificed in Tenochtitlan. In the colonial period, Ozolotepec paid tribute in gold dust and xicoles (possibly peyote).
