= Amatlán Zapotec =

Zapotec language

- (San Cristóbal Amatlán)
- Dizhze
- Native to: Mexico
- Region: Oaxaca
- Native speakers: (10,000 cited 2000); 2,000 monolinguals
- Language family: Oto-Manguean: Zapotecan; Zapotec; Sierra Sur; Miahuatlan; Amatlán Zapotec
- Dialects: San Cristóbal Amatlán; San Francisco Logueche

Language codes
- ISO 639-3: zpo
- Glottolog: amat1238
- ELP: Amatec Zapotec (shared)

Amatlán Zapotec (Northeastern Miahuatlán Zapotec) is a Zapotec language spoken in southern Oaxaca, Mexico, in the municipalities of San Cristóbal Amatlán and San Francisco Logueche, in the district of Miahuatlán. Although the towns' residents speak different dialects, the dialects are mutually intelligible.
