= San Mateo Río Hondo =

- Municipality and town
- Location in Mexico San Mateo Río Hondo (Oaxaca)
- Coordinates: 16°9′N 96°27′W
- Country: Mexico
- State: Oaxaca

Area
  - Total: 81.96 km^{2} (31.64 sq mi)

Population (2005)
  - Total: 3,495
- Time zone: UTC-6 (Central Standard Time)
- Website: https://www.facebook.com/sanmateoriohondo

Woman working in San Mateo Río Hondo

San Mateo Río Hondo is the name of a town and municipality in the state of Oaxaca, Mexico. It is part of the Miahuatlán District in the south of the Sierra Sur Region. It is 2,300 meters above sea level. Known in the colonial era as "Tetequipa" in Nahuatl and "Yegoyoxi" in Zapotec, both names meaning "river of sand." As municipal seat San Mateo Río Hondo has governing jurisdiction over the following communities: Barranca Grande, El Campanario, El Cuachepil, El Encino, El Esfuerzo, El Manzanal, El Naranjal, El Progreso, El Tavel, Falda de Portillo, Horno de Cal, Jalatengo, La Concepción, La Doncella, La Floreña, La Victoria, Las Nubes, Las Tinas, Loma San Marcial, Miramar, Piedra Gentil, Pinabete (Llano de Pinabete), Ranchería Yogoló (Piedra Manchada), Rancho Cañas, Rancho Cerezales, Rancho Madroño (Rancho el Capulín), Rancho Nuevo, Río Cuapinol, Río Grande, Río Molino, Río Pacífico, San Antonio, San Felipe (Manzanillo), San Ildefonso Ozolotepec, San José del Pacífico, San Melchor, San Pablo, Tres Cruces, Yogoló, and Zapotitlán. San Mateo Rio Hondo is divided into three areas: Nochixtlán district, Mixtecan region and San Mateo Sindihui. The municipality has three hills: La Postura, Zaniltepec and Cerro León. The weather is mostly cold and wet. The population is 3,495. The surface area is 81.96 km^{2}.
