= San Pablo Coatlán =

- Municipality and town
- Location in Mexico
- Coordinates: 16°13′N 96°47′W
- Country: Mexico
- State: Oaxaca

Area
  - Total: 195.2 km^{2} (75.4 sq mi)

Population (2005)
  - Total: 3,876
- Time zone: UTC-6 (Central Standard Time)

San Pablo Coatlán is a town and municipality in Oaxaca in south-western Mexico. The municipality covers an area of 195.2 km^{2}. It is part of the Miahuatlán District in the south of the Sierra Sur Region.

As of 2005, the municipality had a total population of 3,876.

== History ==
Coatlan was a prehispanic settlement (or group of settlements) inhabited by Zapotec people. Because there are now several towns called Coatlan, it is unclear which one corresponds to the prehispanic town described in historic documents. At any rate, Coatlan was a city-state with several subject towns. It was constantly at war against Tututepec, and also went to war with Miahuatlan before it was conquered by Moctezuma II. Afterwards, a Mexica governor, military officers, and warriors were sent here to help defend against Tututepec. In return, Coatlan paid tribute in gold dust, mantas, and manpower.

According to legend, sacrifice was introduced to Coatlan by a local cacique who had visited the Mixteca Alta and learned from the customs there. Upon his return, he created and placed in a large cave an idol called Benelaba ("Seven Rabbit") and his wife Jonaji Belachina ("Three Deer") to be worshipped by men and women respectively.
