= Sitio de Xitlapehua =

- Municipality and town
- Location in Mexico
- Coordinates: 16°22′N 96°33′W
- Country: Mexico
- State: Oaxaca
- Time zone: UTC-6 (Central Standard Time)

Sitio de Xitlapehua is a town and municipality in Oaxaca in south-western Mexico. It is part of the Miahuatlán District in the south of the Sierra Sur Region.

José Yolando Jarquín Bustamante became the tenth municipal president from Oaxaca to die from COVID-19 on January 26, 2021.
