= Santa Catarina Cuixtla =

- Municipality and town
- Location in Mexico
- Coordinates: 16°18′N 96°39′W
- Country: Mexico
- State: Oaxaca

Population (2010)
  - Total: 1,496
- Time zone: UTC-6 (Central Standard Time)

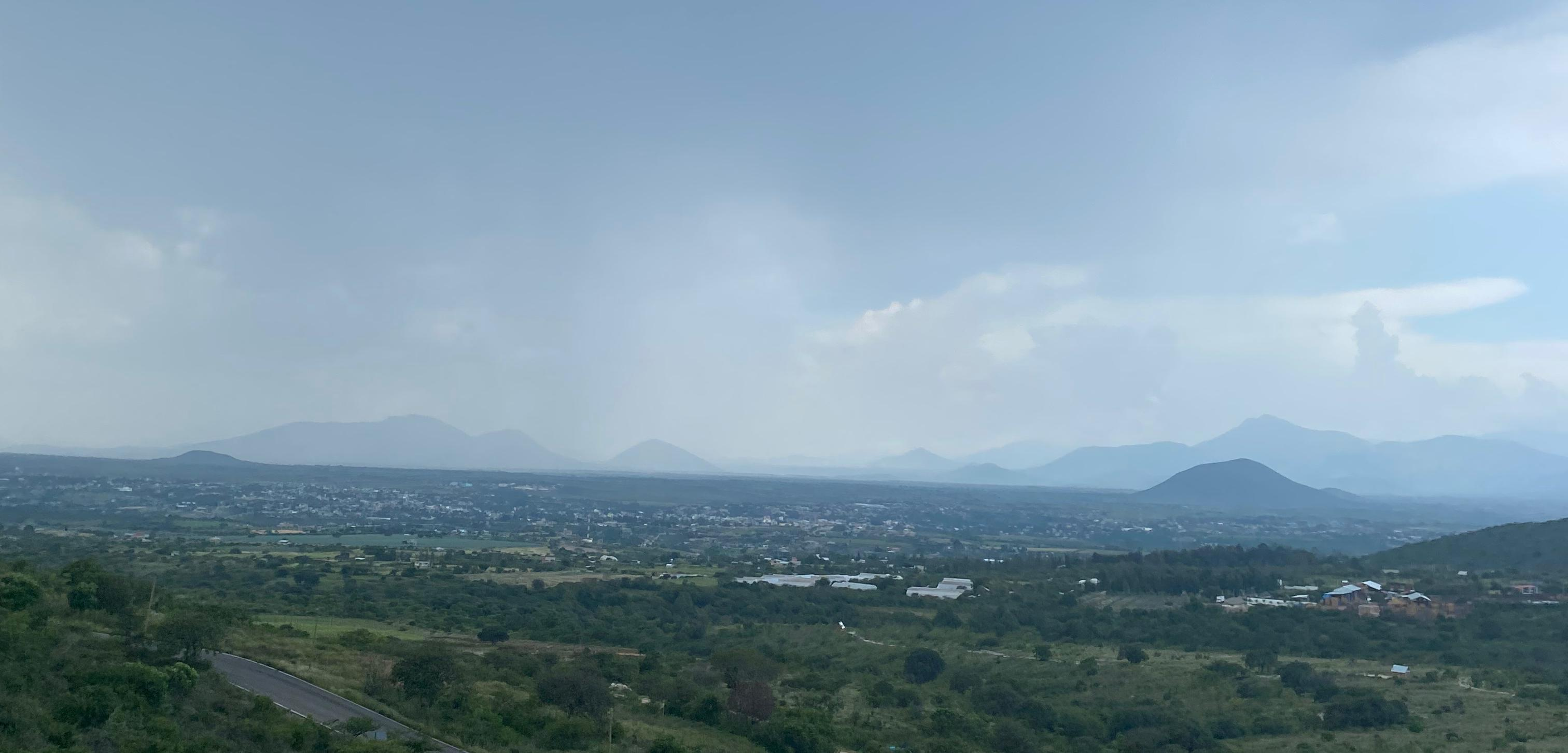

Santa Catarina Cuixtla is a town and municipality in Oaxaca in south-western Mexico. It is part of the Miahuatlán District in the south of the Sierra Sur Region. The municipality covers an area of 26.37 km^{2}.

As of 2010, the municipality had a total population of 1,496.
