= Santo Tomás Tamazulapan =

- Location within Mexico
- Coordinates: 16°16′N 96°35′W
- Country: Mexico
- State: Oaxaca
- Municipality: Santo Tomás Tamazulapan
- Time zone: UTC-6 (Central (US Central))

Santo Tomás Tamazulapan is a village and municipality in the state of Oaxaca, Mexico, located about 105 km south of Oaxaca city. It is 1,700 meters above sea level and is part of the Miahuatlán District in the south of the Sierra Sur Region. Its name comes from the patron saint of the town (Saint Thomas) and the last part is from Nahuatl meaning “in the river of frogs”. It is unknown when the town was founded.

== The municipality ==
As municipal seat, Tamazulapan has governing authority over the following communities: Cerro de Tepalcatillos, El Cerrito, El Podrido, El Sabino, El Terrero, Güilotes, Los Manantiales, and San Jerónimo Miahuatlán.
