= San Francisco Logueche =

- Municipality and town
- Location in Mexico
- Coordinates: 16°21′N 96°23′W
- Country: Mexico
- State: Oaxaca

Area
  - Total: 76.55 km^{2} (29.56 sq mi)

Population (2005)
  - Total: 2,240
- Time zone: UTC-6 (Central Standard Time)

San Francisco Logueche is a town and municipality in Oaxaca in south-western Mexico. The municipality covers an area of 76.55 km^{2} (29.56 sq mi). It is part of the Miahuatlán District in the south of the Sierra Sur Region.

As of 2005, the municipality had a total population of 2,240.

Amatlán Zapotec is spoken in the town. It is located "at the foot of a very tall mountain" called Yiroos in Zapotec.
