= San Andrés Paxtlán =

- Municipality and town
- Location in Mexico
- Coordinates: 16°13′N 96°30′W
- Country: Mexico
- State: Oaxaca

Area
  - Total: 77.83 km^{2} (30.05 sq mi)

Population (2005)
  - Total: 4,066
- Time zone: UTC-6 (Central Standard Time)

San Andrés Paxtlán is a town and municipality in Oaxaca in south-western Mexico. The municipality covers an area of 77.83 km^{2}. It is part of the Miahuatlán District in the south of the Sierra Sur Region.

As of 2005, the municipality had a total population of 4,066.
