= Santa Cruz Xitla =

- Municipality and town
- Location in Mexico
- Coordinates: 16°19′N 96°40′W
- Country: Mexico
- State: Oaxaca
- Time zone: UTC-6 (Central Standard Time)

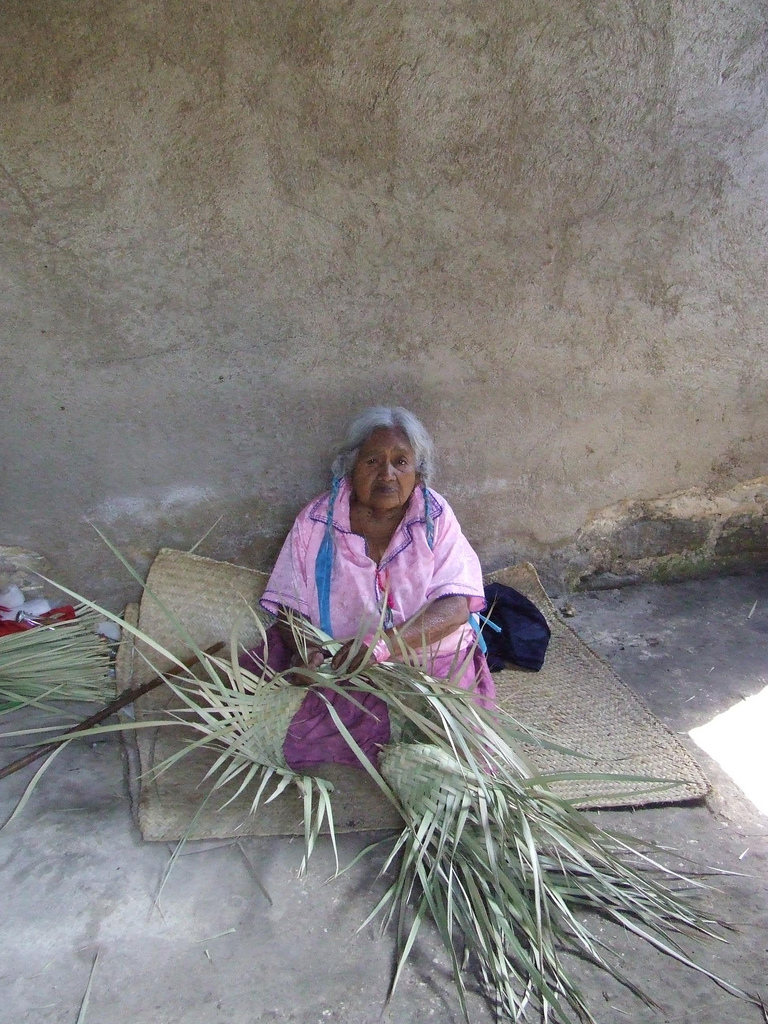
Palm weaver in Xitla

Santa Cruz Xitla is a town and municipality in Oaxaca in south-western Mexico. The municipality covers an area of km^{2}. It is part of the Miahuatlán District in the south of the Sierra Sur Region.

As of 2005, the municipality had a total population of 3,933.

Municipal president Pedro Modesto Santos died of COVID-19 in September 2020. He was the eighth municipal president in Oaxaca to die of the virus.
