= Rodulfo =

Rodulfo is both a given name and a surname. Notable people with the name include:

- Rodulfo Amando Philippi Bañados (1905–1969), Chilean ornithologist
- Rodulfo Brito Foucher (1899–1970), Mexican lawyer and academic
- Rodulfo del Valle (1871–1948), Puerto Rican politician
- Rodulfo Manzo (born 1949), Peruvian footballer
- Manuel Rodulfo Tardo (1913–1998), Cuban artist
- Néstor Rodulfo (born 1972), Puerto Rican actor

== See also ==
- Dr. Rodulfo Figueroa, locality in Chiapas, Mexico
