= San Miguel Suchixtepec =

- Municipality and town
- Location in Mexico
- Coordinates: 16°05′N 96°23′W
- Country: Mexico
- State: Oaxaca

Area
  - Total: 107.17 km^{2} (41.38 sq mi)

Population (2005)
  - Total: 2,694
- Time zone: UTC-6 (Central Standard Time)

San Miguel Suchixtepec is a town and municipality in Oaxaca in south-western Mexico. The municipality covers an area of 107.17 km^{2}. It is part of the Miahuatlán District in the south of the Sierra Sur Region.

As of 2005, the municipality had a total population of 2,694.
