= San Nicolás, Oaxaca =

- Municipality and town
- Location in Mexico
- Coordinates: 16°26′N 96°45′W
- Country: Mexico
- State: Oaxaca

Area
  - Total: 29.34 km^{2} (11.33 sq mi)

Population (2005)
  - Total: 632
- Time zone: UTC-6 (Central Standard Time)

San Nicolás is a town and municipality in Oaxaca in south-western Mexico. The municipality covers an area of 29.34 km^{2}. It is part of the Miahuatlán District in the south of the Sierra Sur Region. As of 2005, the municipality had a total population of 632.

== History ==
San Nicolas (named after the patron saint) it is a municipality where the founding date is ignored, until the year 1977 when two states were settled.

== Geography ==
It is located in the southern state of Oaxaca, with coordinates of 16°26'N latitude and 96°45'W longitude at an altitude of 1,460 meters (4,790 ft) above sea level. It is located 289 kilometers (180 mi) from the state capital. It is a mountainous region with a temperate climate with summer rainfalls. It is bordered on the north by Crespo Ejutla, on the west by Yogana Ejutla Crespo, on the east by Miahuatlán of Porfirio Diaz and on the south by Almolonga San Simon.

=== Flora and fauna ===
The region is mountainous region; the main mountains are Cerro de la Caja, Cerro del Shigui, Cerro de las Palomas and Cerro de Ojo de Agua. The predominant flora consists of numerous species of valuable timber trees such as yegareche, red, strawberry, yegalan, sumac, black, oak, fig, juniper and vanilla. The fruit trees are: orange, lemon lime, tangerine, mamey sapote, avocado, walnut, guava, annona, nanache, and coffee.

There are also many medicinal plants such as Artemisia ludoviciana, aloe vera, eucalyptus, Condea verticillata, sagebrush, barge, horehound, mustard, Dichondra, rue, Tessaria, mint and chamomile. The most precious natural resource is its timberland.

== Demography ==
This municipality has a population of 632 inhabitants. According to the 2005 population and housing census, only three people living in the municipality speak an indigenous language. The Catholic population amounts to 847 (5 years and older) and there are 13 non-Catholics in the same age range.

== Infrastructure ==
According to the results presented in the 2005 population and housing census, there are over 215 houses, of which 214 are private. 70% of homes are built with adobe, tile, sheet and flat land; 30% are built with brick, and concrete slab floors. The most important means of communication are the post office and a long distance telephone booth.
