= San Simón Almolongas =

- Municipality and town
- Location in Mexico
- Coordinates: 16°24′N 96°43′W
- Country: Mexico
- State: Oaxaca
- Time zone: UTC-6 (Central Standard Time)

San Simón Almolongas is a town and municipality in Oaxaca in south-western Mexico. The municipality covers an area of km^{2}. It is part of the Miahuatlán District in the south of the Sierra Sur Region.

== External sources ==
- Consejo Nacional de Población y Vivienda, La Población de los Municipios de México 1950 - 1990. Ed. UNO Servicios Gráficos, México, Nov., 1994.
- Instituto Nacional de Estadística, Geografía e Informática, Censo General de Población y Vivienda 2000. México 2001.
- Secretaría de Gobernación, Centro Nacional de Estudios Municipales, Gobierno del Estado de Oaxaca, Los Municipios de Oaxaca, Enciclopedia de los Municipios de México. Talleres Gráficos de la Nación, México, D.F. 1988.
- Secretaría de Gobernación, Instituto Nacional para el Federalismo y el Desarrollo Municipal, Sistema Nacional de Información Municipal. México 2002.
