= Santa Ana, Oaxaca =

Municipality in the state of Oaxaca, Mexico

- Municipality and town
- Location in Mexico
- Coordinates: 16.3333°N 96.7167°W
- Country: Mexico
- State: Oaxaca
- Time zone: UTC-6 (Central Standard Time)

Santa Ana, Oaxaca is a town and municipality in Oaxaca in southwestern Mexico. The municipality covers an area of 8.023 km^{2}. It is part of the Miahuatlán District in the south of the Sierra Sur Region.

As of 2005, the municipality had a total population of 2,000.
