= San Juan Ozolotepec =

- Municipality and town
- Location in Mexico
- Coordinates: 16°08′N 96°15′W
- Country: Mexico
- State: Oaxaca

Area
  - Total: 117.38 km^{2} (45.32 sq mi)

Population (2005)
  - Total: 2,779
- Time zone: UTC-6 (Central Standard Time)

San Juan Ozolotepec is a town and municipality in Oaxaca in south-western Mexico. The municipality covers an area of 117.38 km^{2}. It is part of the Miahuatlán District in the south of the Sierra Sur Region.

As of 2005, the municipality had a total population of 2,779.
