= Domingo Arenas =

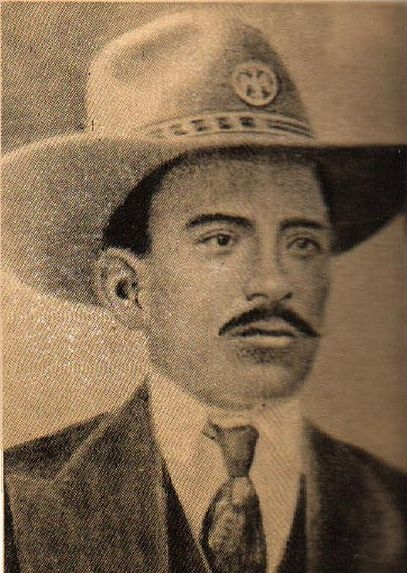
General Domingo Arenas

Domingo Arenas (1888 – 1918) was a Mexican revolutionary from the state of Tlaxcala. Born in the Nahua community of Zacatelco, he was raised as a farmer and worked as a shepherd, bread salesman and factory worker. At the beginning of the Mexican Revolution he join the forces of Francisco I. Madero, and at the fall of Madero joined the Zapatistas against the Constitutionalists by signing the Plan de Ayala. Discontented with how the Zapatistas treated the locals of Tlaxcala, he switched to support Venustiano Carranza against Emiliano Zapata. In 1916 he was killed by Zapatista general Gildardo Magaña in a botched parlay. At the height of their influence the Arenistas controlled most of Tlaxcala and Southern Puebla. The municipality of Domingo Arenas is named after him.
