= San Miguel Coatlán =

- Municipality and town
- Location in Mexico
- Coordinates: 16°12′N 96°42′W
- Country: Mexico
- State: Oaxaca

Area
  - Total: 165.86 km^{2} (64.04 sq mi)

Population (2005)
  - Total: 2,808
- Time zone: UTC-6 (Central Standard Time)

San Miguel Coatlán is a town and municipality in Oaxaca in south-western Mexico. The municipality covers an area of 165.86 km^{2}. It is part of the Miahuatlán District in the south of the Sierra Sur Region.

As of 2005, the municipality had a total population of 2,808.
