= San Ildefonso Amatlán =

- Municipality and town
- Location in Mexico
- Coordinates: 16°20′N 96°29′W
- Country: Mexico
- State: Oaxaca

Area
  - Total: 91.9 km^{2} (35.5 sq mi)

Population (2005)
  - Total: 2,009
- Time zone: UTC-6 (Central Standard Time)

San Ildefonso Amatlán is a town and municipality in Oaxaca in south-western Mexico. The municipality covers an area of 91.9 km^{2}. It is part of the Miahuatlán District in the south of the Sierra Sur Region.

As of 2005, the municipality had a total population of 2,009.
