= San Jerónimo Coatlán =

- Municipality and town
- Location in Mexico
- Coordinates: 16°14′N 96°52′W
- Country: Mexico
- State: Oaxaca

Area
  - Total: 338.1 km^{2} (130.5 sq mi)

Population (2005)
  - Total: 4,979
- Time zone: UTC-6 (Central Standard Time)

San Jerónimo Coatlán is a town and municipality in Oaxaca in south-western Mexico. The municipality covers an area of 338.1 km^{2}. It is part of the Miahuatlán District in the south of the Sierra Sur Region.

As of 2005, the municipality had a total population of 4,979.
