= San Marcial Ozolotepec =

- Municipality and town
- Location in Mexico
- Coordinates: 16°05′N 96°24′W
- Country: Mexico
- State: Oaxaca

Area
  - Total: 53.58 km^{2} (20.69 sq mi)

Population (2005)
  - Total: 1,399
- Time zone: UTC-6 (Central Standard Time)

San Marcial Ozolotepec is a town and municipality in Oaxaca in south-western Mexico. The municipality covers an area of 53.58 km^{2}. It is part of the Miahuatlán District in the south of the Sierra Sur Region.

As of 2005, the municipality had a total population of 1,399.
