= San Luis Amatlán =

- Municipality and town
- Location in Mexico
- Coordinates: 16°23′N 96°30′W
- Country: Mexico
- State: Oaxaca

Area
  - Total: 170.96 km^{2} (66.01 sq mi)

Population (2005)
  - Total: 3,393
- Time zone: UTC-6 (Central Standard Time)

San Luis Amatlán is a town and municipality in Oaxaca in south-western Mexico. The municipality covers an area of 170.96 km^{2}. It is part of the Miahuatlán District in the south of the Sierra Sur Region.

As of 2005, the municipality had a total population of 3,393.

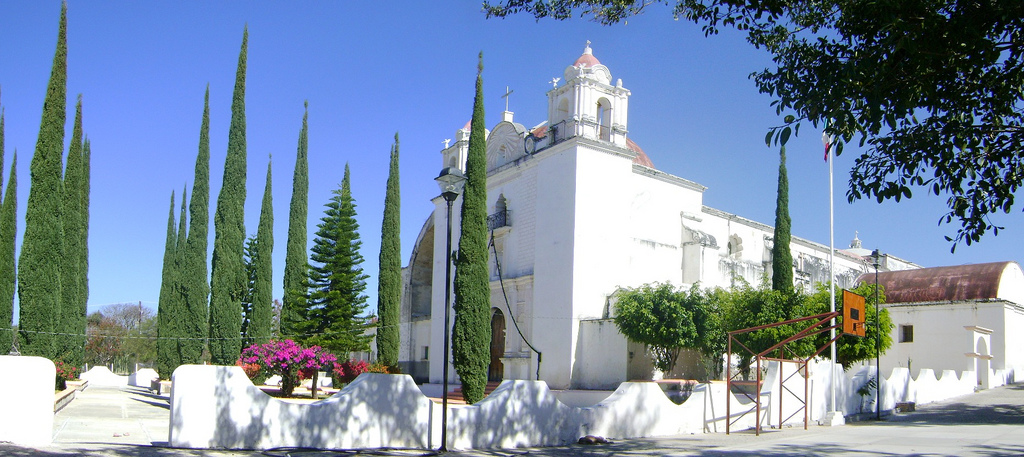
Church in San Luis Amatlán
