= San Cristóbal Amatlán =

- Municipality and town
- Location in Mexico
- Coordinates: 16°19′N 96°24′W
- Country: Mexico
- State: Oaxaca
- Established: 1715

Area
  - Total: 96.96 km^{2} (37.44 sq mi)
- Elevation: 1,700 m (5,590 ft)

Population (2005)
  - Total: 3,978
- Time zone: UTC-6 (Central Standard Time)

San Cristóbal Amatlán is a town and municipality in Oaxaca in south-western Mexico. The municipality covers an area of 96.96 km^{2}. It is part of the Miahuatlán District in the south of the Sierra Sur Region.

As of 2005, the municipality had a total population of 3,978.

Amatlán Zapotec is spoken in the town; many residents are bilingual in Spanish. The town is located "at the foot of a very tall mountain" called Yiroos in Zapotec.
