= Santa María Chilapa de Díaz =

- Municipality and town
- Location in Mexico
- Coordinates: 17°35′N 97°38′W
- Country: Mexico
- State: Oaxaca

Area
  - Total: 234.75 km^{2} (90.64 sq mi)
- Elevation: 1,900 m (6,200 ft)

Population (2005)
  - Total: 1,687
- Time zone: UTC-6 (Central Standard Time)

Santa María Chilapa de Díaz is a town and municipality in Oaxaca in south-western Mexico. It is part of the Teposcolula District in the center of the Mixteca Region. The name Chilapa means "Water from chiles".

== Geography ==
The municipality covers an area of 234.75 km^{2} at an altitude of 1900 meters above sea level. The climate is mild, averaging about 17 °C.

=== Flora and fauna ===
Trees include oak, pine and pitch pine. Wild fauna include coyotes, snakes, lizards and scorpions.

== Demography ==
As of 2005, the municipality had 484 households with a total population of 1,687 of whom 151 spoke an indigenous language.

== Economy ==
Economic activity includes agriculture (corn, beans and wheat) and some cattle ranching. There is a cooperative that processes sugar cane from the state of Veracruz for rum and brandy. In addition there is a factory making polyethylene products and a third dedicated to manufacture and marketing of raffia.

== History ==
The foundation date of the town is unknown because it burned down in 1879 and all the original titles were lost.
