= Juan de la Luz Enriquez, Veracruz =

Coordinates: 17°11′18″N 94°49′22″W

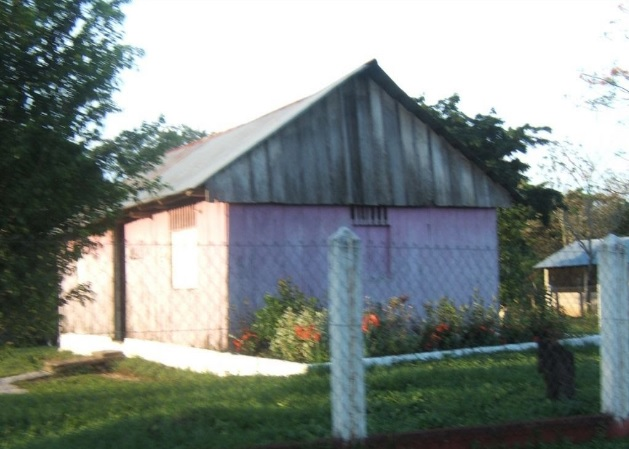
The primary school in Juan de la Luz Enriquez

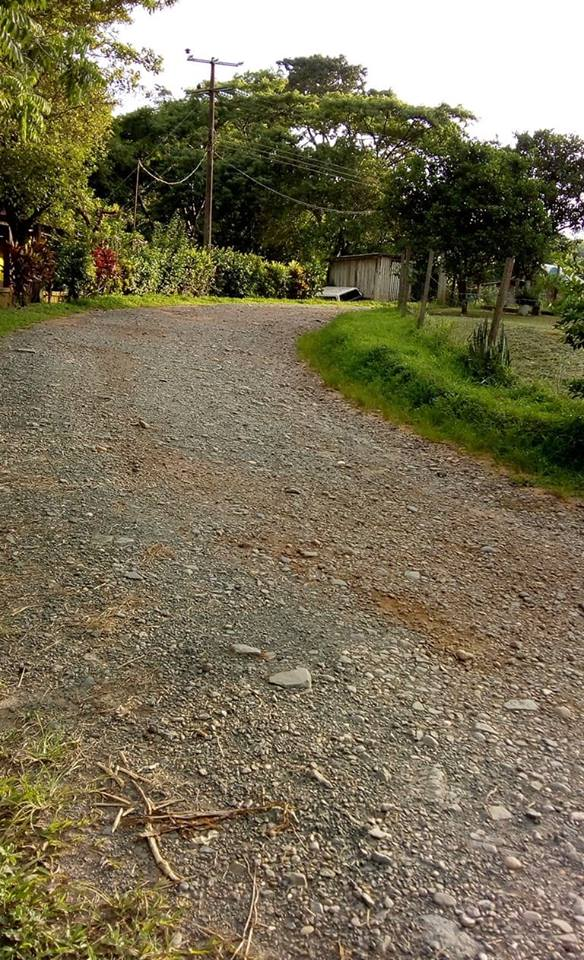
Juan de la Luz Enriquez, Jesus Carranza veracruz Mexico Rural Street

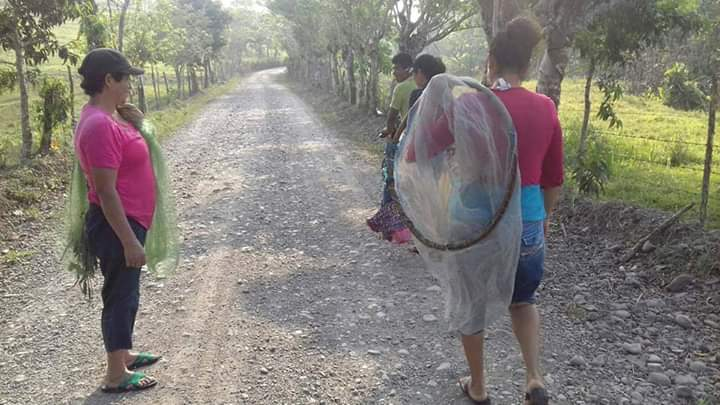
Woman with Matayahual in Juan de la Luz

Juan de la Luz Enríquez is a town in the municipality of Jesús Carranza, Veracruz, Mexico. It has 196 inhabitants, as of 2010. It borders to the north with the town of Juan Escutia, to the west with vacant lots of the state of Oaxaca, to the south-east with the town of Casa Blanca and the Uxpanapa Valley and to the south with the municipality of Santa María Chimalapa, also in Oaxaca. It is located 120 meters above sea level. The Latitude is -94.784589 and the Longitude 17.188500, the GPS coordinates are 17° 11 '18.6 'N 94° 49'22.0188 W. The postal code is 96976. and the most used telephone area codes are 972 and 974.

== Weather ==
The weather in the region is hot and wet with rains in summer and winter, the mean temperature is 32 °C in summer, (April to May) and 13 °C in winter (November - December). The main meteorological forces are called locally "North" (Trasviña et al., 1995) and "South". "South" are dry southern or eastern winds that last up to 3 months in a row, coming from the Gulf of Mexico. They arrive typically in March, April or May and dry up the soil causing droughts, and "North" is monsoon-like rain that last up to 3 months in winter, bringing floods and mud.
