= Hueycantenango =

City in the Mexican state of Guerrero

- Municipal seat and city
- Location in Mexico Hueycantenango (Mexico)
- Coordinates: 17°29′N 99°6′W
- Country: Mexico
- State: Guerrero
- Municipality: José Joaquín de Herrera
- Time zone: UTC-6 (Zona Centro)

Hueycantenango is a city and seat of the municipality of José Joaquín de Herrera, in the Mexican state of Guerrero.
