= José Joaquín de Herrera (municipality) =

Municipality in the Mexican state of Guerrero

- Municipality
- Location in Mexico
- Coordinates: 18°13′N 99°29′W
- Country: Mexico
- State: Guerrero
- Municipal seat: Hueycantenango

Population (2005)
  - Total: 14,424

José Joaquín de Herrera is a municipality in the Mexican state of Guerrero. The municipal seat lies at Hueycantenango.

As of 2005, the municipality had a total population of 14,424.
