= Domingo Arenas (municipality) =

Coordinates: 19°09′N 98°26′W

- Municipality
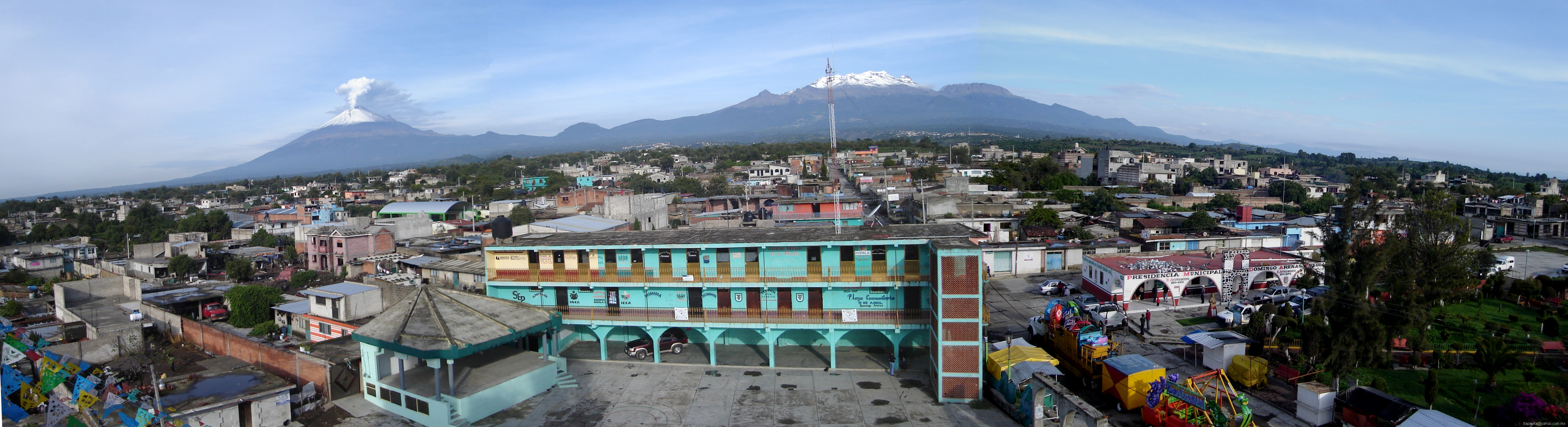

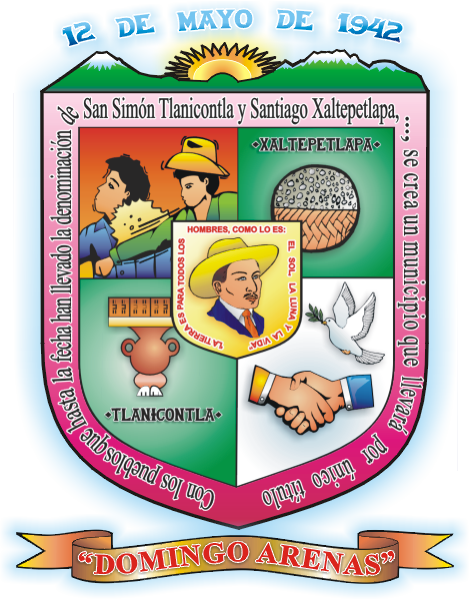
- Coat of arms

- Location of the municipality in Puebla
- Country: Mexico
- State: Puebla
- Time zone: UTC-6 (Zona Centro)

Domingo Arenas is a municipality in the Mexican state of Puebla.
