= Dr. Rodulfo Figueroa =

- Interactive map of Dr. Rodulfo Figueroa
- Coordinates: 15°51′03″N 92°03′44″W
- Country: Mexico
- State: Chiapas
- Elevation: 580 m (1,900 ft)

Population (2010)
  - Total: 2 113
- Time zone: UTC−6 (UTC)
- Postal code: 30154
- Area code: 963
- Website: https://sites.google.com/view/rodulfofigueroa

Dr. Rodulfo Figueroa is a locality in the Mexican state of Chiapas.
