= Santa María Alotepec =

- Municipality and town
- Location in Mexico
- Coordinates: 17°5′N 95°51′W
- Country: Mexico
- State: Oaxaca

Area
  - Total: 149.27 km^{2} (57.63 sq mi)
- Elevation: 1,460 m (4,790 ft)

Population (2005)
  - Total: 2,526
- Time zone: UTC-6 (Central Standard Time)

Santa María Alotepec is a town and municipality in Oaxaca in south-western Mexico. It is part of the Sierra Mixe district within the Sierra Norte de Oaxaca region.

== Name ==
The name Alotepec means "hill of the macaws".

== Geography ==
The area includes an area of 149.27 square kilometres (57.63 sq mi) at an altitude of 1,460 metres (4,790 ft) above sea level. Trees include pine, oak and cedars. Fruits include orange, banana, mamey sapote, sapodilla, mango, lime, custard apple and avocado. Wild animals include foxes, deer, armadillo, tepescuincle, wild boar and anteater. There is a great variety of butterflies.

== Population ==
In 2020, the municipality had 806 households with a total population of 2,736, of whom 2,434 spoke an indigenous language, primarily Mixe languages.

In 2005, the municipality had 682 households with a total population of 2,526, of whom 2,262 spoke an indigenous language. 90% of the population were engaged in agriculture. A few also keep domestic animals.

The Union of Indigenous Communities of the Isthmus Region, a co-operative founded in 1982, assists in the production and distribution of local products, notably coffee, under a fair trade label.
