= Santiago Miahuatlán =

Coordinates: 18°34′N 97°26′W

- Municipality and town
- Interactive map of Santiago Miahuatlán
- Country: Mexico
- State: Puebla
- Time zone: UTC-6 (Zona Centro)

Santiago Miahuatlán is a town and municipality in the Mexican state of Puebla.
