= Miahuatlán District =

- District
- Oaxaca regions and districts: Sierra Sur to the southwest
- Coordinates: 16°11′N 96°38′W
- Country: Mexico
- State: Oaxaca
- Seat: Miahuatlán

Area
  - Land: 3,928 km^{2} (1,517 sq mi)

Population (2020)
  - Total: 140,207

Miahuatlán District is located in the south of the Sierra Sur Region of the State of Oaxaca, Mexico.

== Municipalities ==
The district includes the following municipalities:

Municipality code	Name	Population		Land Area			Population density	
Municipality code	Name	2020	Rank	km^{2}	sq mi	Rank	2020	Rank
059	Miahuatlán de Porfirio Díaz	50,375	1	467.4	180.5	2	108/km^{2} (279/sq mi)	2
061	Monjas, Oaxaca	2,893	17	22.43	8.66	31	129/km^{2} (334/sq mi)	1
095	San Andrés Paxtlán	4,562	5	57.08	22.04	21	80/km^{2} (207/sq mi)	4
126	San Cristóbal Amatlán	5,396	3	136.8	52.8	11	39/km^{2} (102/sq mi)	17
146	San Francisco Logueche	2,803	19	40.82	15.76	27	69/km^{2} (178/sq mi)	6
148	San Francisco Ozolotepec	2,182	24	49.47	19.10	26	44/km^{2} (114/sq mi)	12
154	San Ildefonso Amatlán	2,329	23	61.10	23.59	20	38/km^{2} (99/sq mi)	19
159	San Jerónimo Coatlán	5,537	2	583.7	225.4	1	9/km^{2} (25/sq mi)	30
167	San José del Peñasco	2,149	25	28.50	11.00	29	75/km^{2} (195/sq mi)	5
170	San José Lachiguiri	3,700	10	77.45	29.90	14	48/km^{2} (124/sq mi)	10
209	San Juan Mixtepec-Distrito 26	607	32	75.45	29.13	15	8/km^{2} (21/sq mi)	31
211	San Juan Ozolotepec	3,411	11	206.5	79.7	6	17/km^{2} (43/sq mi)	26
235	San Luis Amatlán	3,829	8	289	112	3	13/km^{2} (34/sq mi)	29
236	San Marcial Ozolotepec	1,372	27	53.78	20.76	24	26/km^{2} (66/sq mi)	22
254	San Mateo Río Hondo	3,207	13	211.1	81.5	4	15/km^{2} (39/sq mi)	27
263	San Miguel Coatlán	3,184	14	123.5	47.7	12	26/km^{2} (67/sq mi)	21
279	San Miguel Suchixtepec	2,932	16	69.55	26.85	17	42/km^{2} (109/sq mi)	13
289	San Nicolás	1,214	28	29.56	11.41	28	41/km^{2} (106/sq mi)	15
291	San Pablo Coatlán	4,308	6	187.9	72.5	7	23/km^{2} (59/sq mi)	23
254	San Pedro Mixtepec-Distrito 26	972	30	154.6	59.7	8	6/km^{2} (16/sq mi)	32
344	San Sebastián Coatlán	2,809	18	206.9	79.9	5	14/km^{2} (35/sq mi)	28
347	San Sebastián Río Hondo	4,202	7	106.2	41.0	13	40/km^{2} (102/sq mi)	16
351	San Simón Almolongas	2,802	20	50.78	19.61	25	55/km^{2} (143/sq mi)	8
353	Santa Ana	2,406	22	54.75	21.14	23	44/km^{2} (114/sq mi)	11
362	Santa Catarina Cuixtla	1,495	26	25.57	9.87	30	58/km^{2} (151/sq mi)	7
384	Santa Cruz Xitla	4,794	4	56.88	21.96	22	84/km^{2} (218/sq mi)	3 }
391	Santa Lucía Miahuatlán	3,375	12	69.97	27.02	16	48/km^{2} (125/sq mi)	9
424	Santa María Ozolotepec	3,793	9	145.3	56.1	9	26/km^{2} (68/sq mi)	20
495	Santiago Xanica	3,029	15	137.2	53.0	10	22/km^{2} (57/sq mi)	24
512	Santo Domingo Ozolotepec	1,101	29	64.16	24.77	19	17/km^{2} (44/sq mi)	25
533	Santo Tomás Tamazulapan	2,726	21	66.58	25.71	18	41/km^{2} (106/sq mi)	14
538	Sitio de Xitlapehua	713	31	18.22	7.03	32	39/km^{2} (101/sq mi)	18
	Distrito Miahuatlán	140,207	—	3,928	1,516.61	—	36/km^{2} (92/sq mi)	—
Source: INEGI
