= Manta (dress) =

Textile worn as a blanket or wrap-around dress

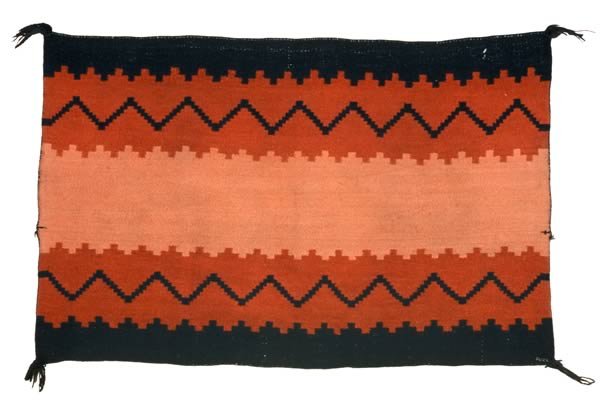
Navajo woman's fancy manta, wool, c. 1850–1865, collection of the Arizona State Museum

A manta is a rectangular textile that was worn as a blanket or as a wrap-around dress. When worn as a dress, the manta is held together by a woven sash.

Mantas are worn by such indigenous peoples as the Navajo, Hopi, and Pueblo peoples. Today mantas are worn during important ceremonies, such as weddings, dances, and feast days

== See also ==
- Manta esperancera
- Navajo weaving
- Serape
