= Miahuatlán de Porfirio Díaz =

- Municipality and town
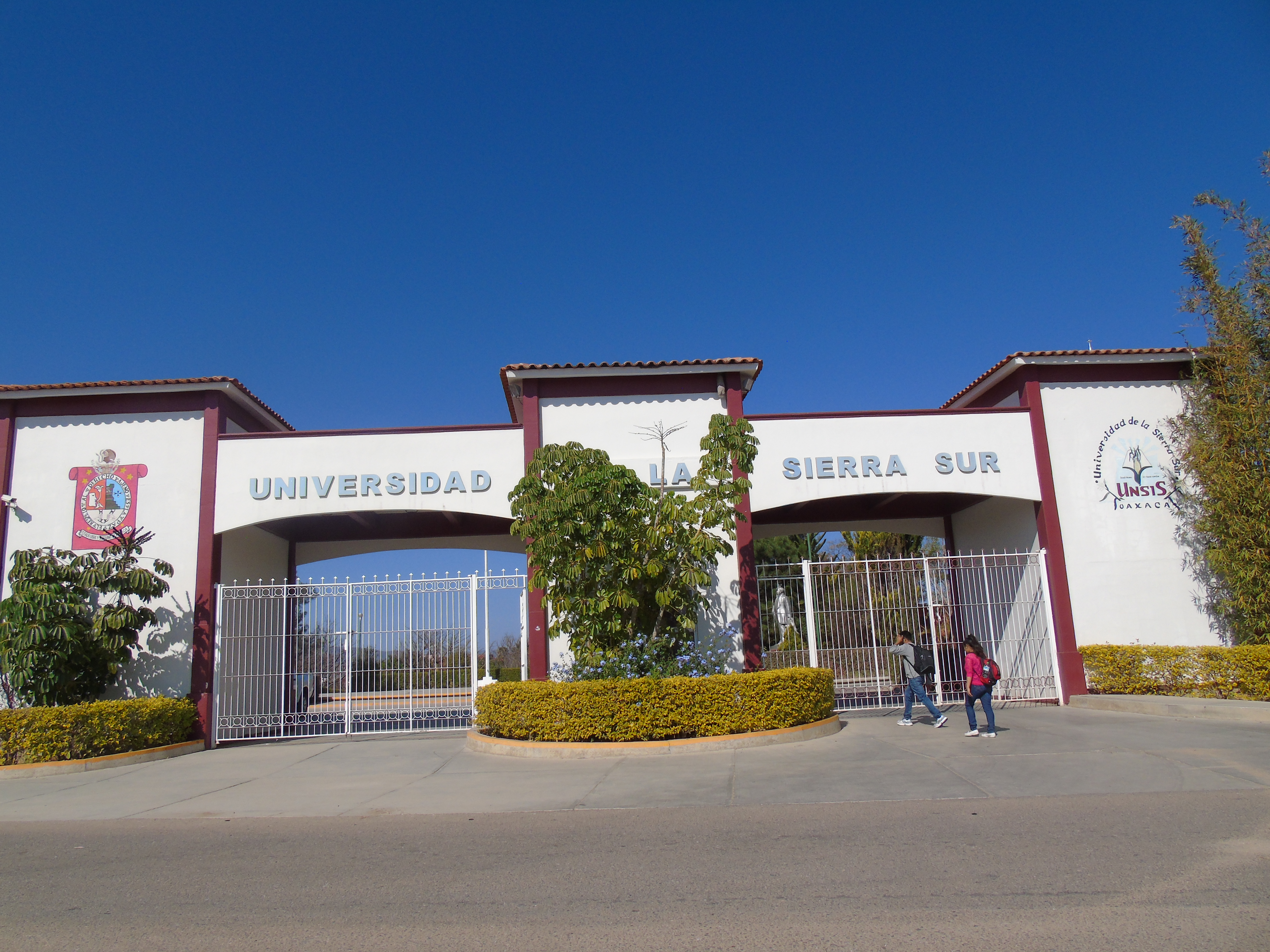
- Universidad de la Sierra Sur

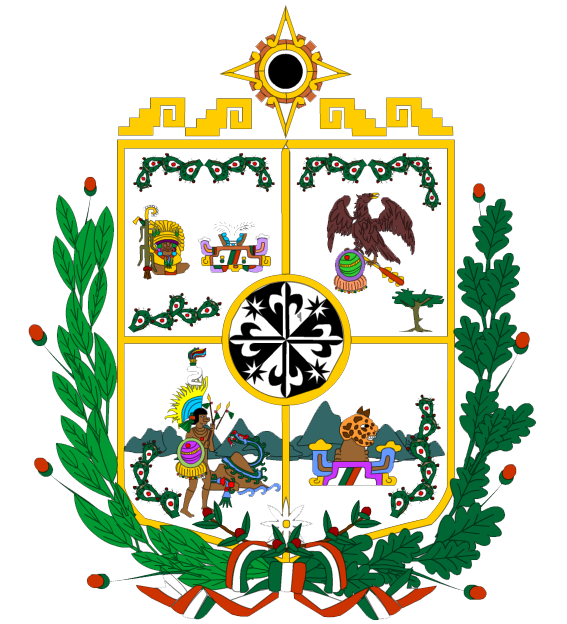
- Coat of arms

- Location in Mexico
- Coordinates: 16°19′N 96°35′W
- Country: Mexico
- State: Oaxaca
- District: Miahuatlán

Area
  - Total: 467.4 km^{2} (180.5 sq mi)
  - Town: 15.46 km^{2} (5.97 sq mi)

Population (2020 census)
  - Total: 50,375
  - Density: 107.8/km^{2} (279.1/sq mi)
  - Town: 29,130
  - Town density: 1,884/km^{2} (4,880/sq mi)
- Time zone: UTC-6 (Central Standard Time)

Miahuatlán de Porfirio Díaz is a town and municipality in Oaxaca in south-eastern Mexico.

== Geography ==
The municipality covers an area of 467.4 km^{2} and is situated at an average elevation of 1,600 meters.

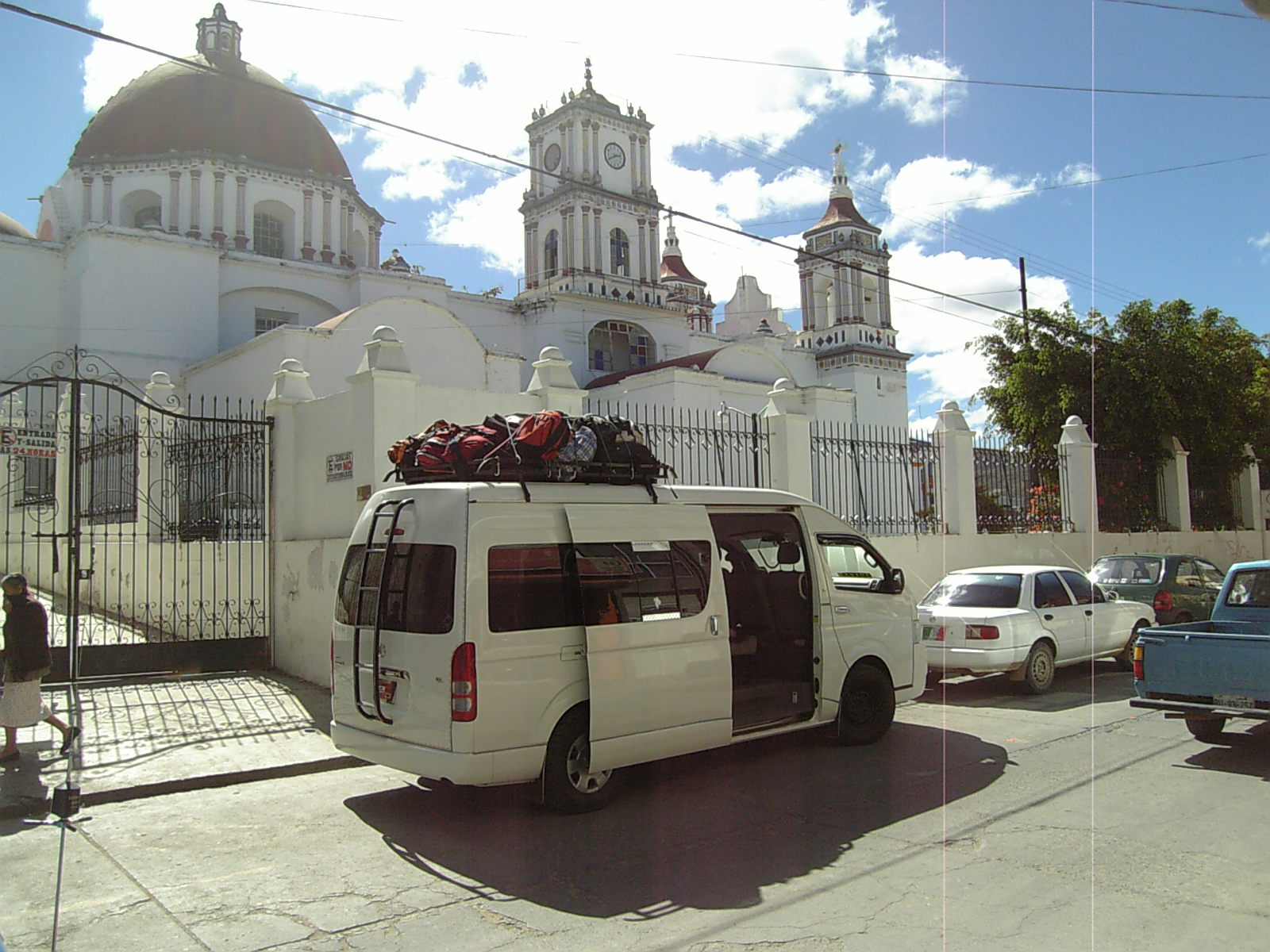
Church in Miahuatlán de Porfirio Díaz

Miahuatlán is part of the Miahuatlán District in the south of the Sierra Sur Region.

== Demography ==
As of 2005, the municipality had 6,708 households with a total population of 32,185, of whom 2,517 spoke an indigenous language.

== Etymology ==
The name comes from the Nahuatl Miahuatlán: Miahua (ear of corn) and tlan (place or area). During the Aztec period the town was known as Miahuapan Miahuatlán, "Canal of the Corn Tassel".

== Education ==
The city has 16 kindergartens, 12 primary schools, a technical high school, a general secondary school, and a regional university, Universidad de la Sierra Sur.

== Infrastructure and media ==
It has a radio station, a television station, telephone service, telegraph and a post office.

== History ==
Before Spanish colonization, Miahuatlan was a Zapotec city-state, called Pelopenitza in Zapotec. It fought wars with Coatlan and Ozolotepec. It was a regional center of commerce, with its market offering local goods like amole, cochineal, and mantas as well as salt, cotton and slaves from far away. It was apparently conquered by the Aztec Empire during the reign of Moctezuma II, after which it became a provincial capital. A Mexica governor took residence and Miahuatlan paid tribute in jewels and gold dust.

In colonial times, Miahuatlan paid tribute in honey, gold dust, mantas and turkey.

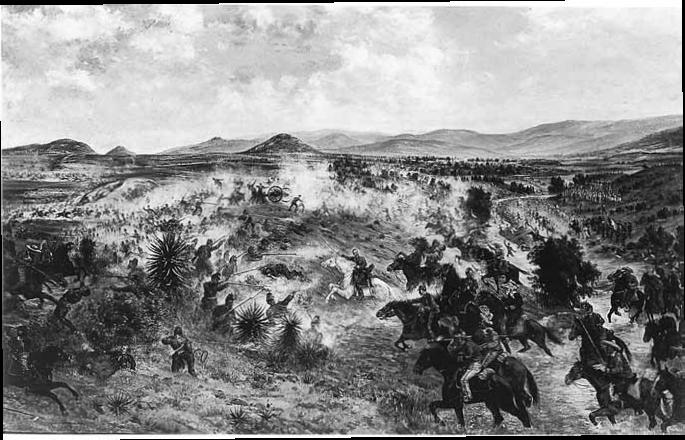

The Battle of Miahuatlán took place near the town on 3 October 1866, an important military action in which the Mexican republican troops defeated a larger force of troops of the Second Mexican Empire. The battle is celebrated in an annual holiday on the date it took place.

In March 1886, an area near Miahuatlán received 183 centimetres (72 in) of snow.
