= Sierra Sur de Oaxaca =

Sierra Sur
- Region
- Oaxaca regions - Sierra Sur towards the south.

- Location within Mexico
- Coordinates: 16°30′45″N 96°58′50″W
- Country: Mexico
- State: Oaxaca
- Largest settlement: Miahuatlán de Porfirio Díaz

Area
  - Total: 15,493 km^{2} (5,982 sq mi)

Population (2020)
  - Total: 346,091
- Time zone: UTC-6 (Central Standard Time)

Sierra Sur is a region in the state of Oaxaca, Mexico. It includes the districts of Putla, Sola de Vega, Miahuatlán and Yautepec. Miahuatlán de Porfirio Díaz is the largest city. The region has 70 municipalities. A number of these are known for great poverty, such as Santa María Zaniza and Santa María Alotepec.

== Geography ==
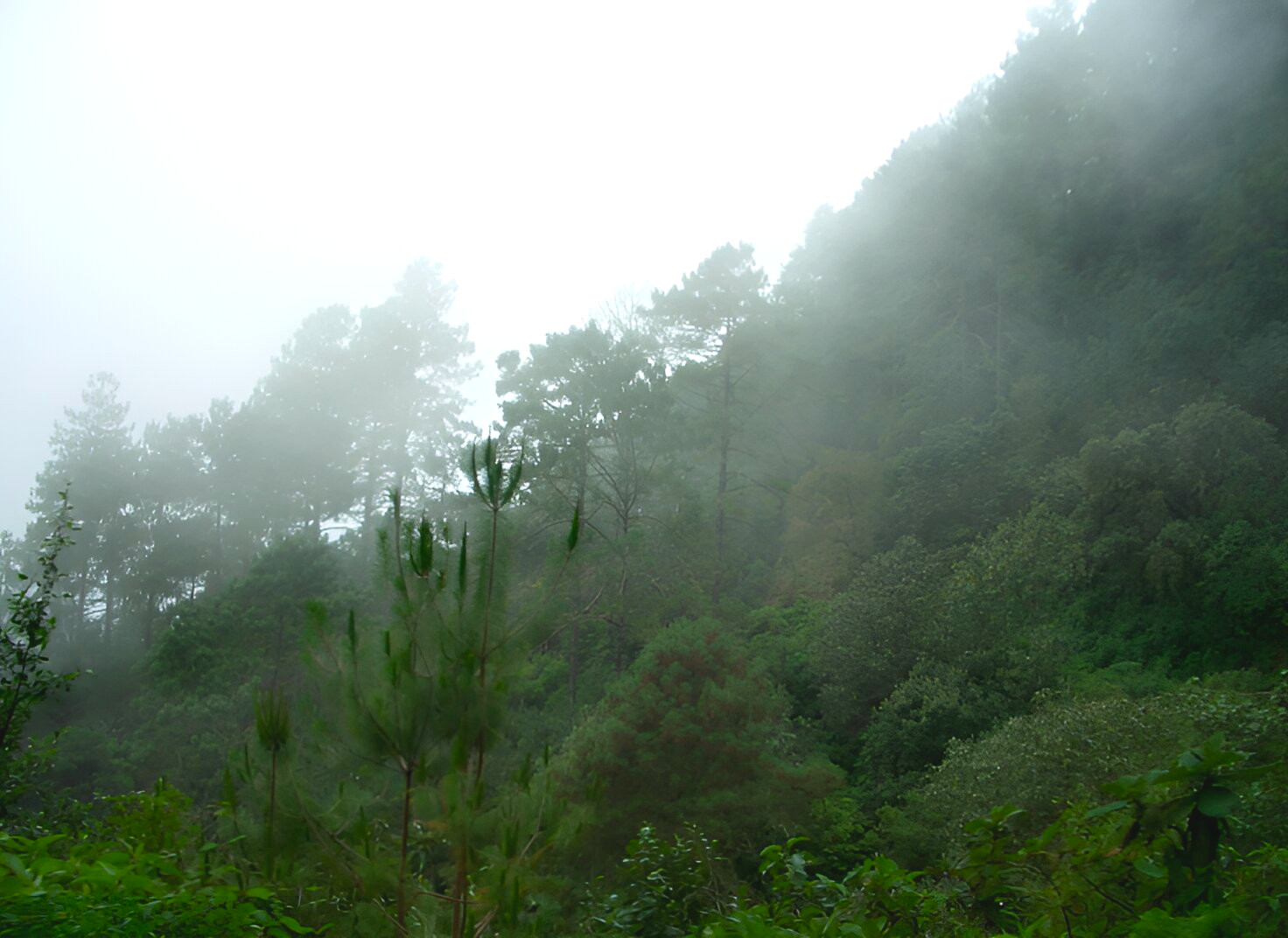
Landscape of the Sierra Sur. Fog banks are frequent throughout the year.

The region is mountainous, along the southern edge of the Sierra Madre del Sur, and includes Quiexoba, the second highest mountain in the state. Forest resources are still important, despite having suffered over-exploitation for decades, and include pines, mixed forests of oak and pine, fir, and areas of hormiguillo cacti. Fauna include opossums, armadillos, deer, rabbit and gopher.

The climate is varied, ranging from hot and humid to temperate humid. The average temperature is 10°C to 22°C throughout the region. Average rainfall ranges from 800 to 2000mm annually.

== Economy ==
Forestry is the main economic activity, with each community managing their forests and selling the logs to private mills. Agricultural production includes maize and beans, sugarcane and coffee. Livestock farming mostly consists of backyard breeding of chickens, goats, pigs and mules. Small factories produce castor oil and process mica. The region has deposits of iron and magnetite. Craft products include spirits and mezcal, palm products and cotton goods.

== Cultural Groups ==
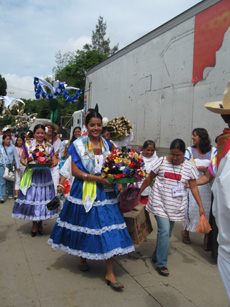
La Sierra Sur is represented by the Putla dance during the Guelaguetza festival.

The region's inhabitants are Zapotec, Mixtec, Chatinos, Amuzgo, Triques and mestizos, as well as emigrants from other parts of Mexico. Since pre-Hispanic times, there has been conflict between rival ethnic groups.
