= Ocotlán =

Ocotlán (from the Nahuatl ocotl ("pine tree"), meaning "place of pines") may refer to:

== Languages ==
- Ocotlán Zapotec, Zapotec language of Oaxaca, Mexico

== Places in Mexico ==
- Ocotlán, Jalisco

- Battle of Ocotlán (1924)

- Ocotlán de Morelos (Oaxaca)
- Ocotlán de Juárez (Oaxaca)
- Ocotlán District (Oaxaca)
- Asunción Ocotlán (Oaxaca)
- Magdalena Ocotlán (Oaxaca)
- San Dionisio Ocotlán (Oaxaca)
- San Francisco de Ocotlán (Puebla)
- Ocotlán, Tlaxcala

- Virgin of Ocotlán, Marian apparition in 1541
- Battle of Ocotlán (1856)

- San Pedro Ocotlán (Zacatecas)

== Events ==
- 2015 Ocotlán ambush
