= San Martín Tilcajete =

San Martín or Tilcajete
- Town & Municipality
- San Martín Tilcajete
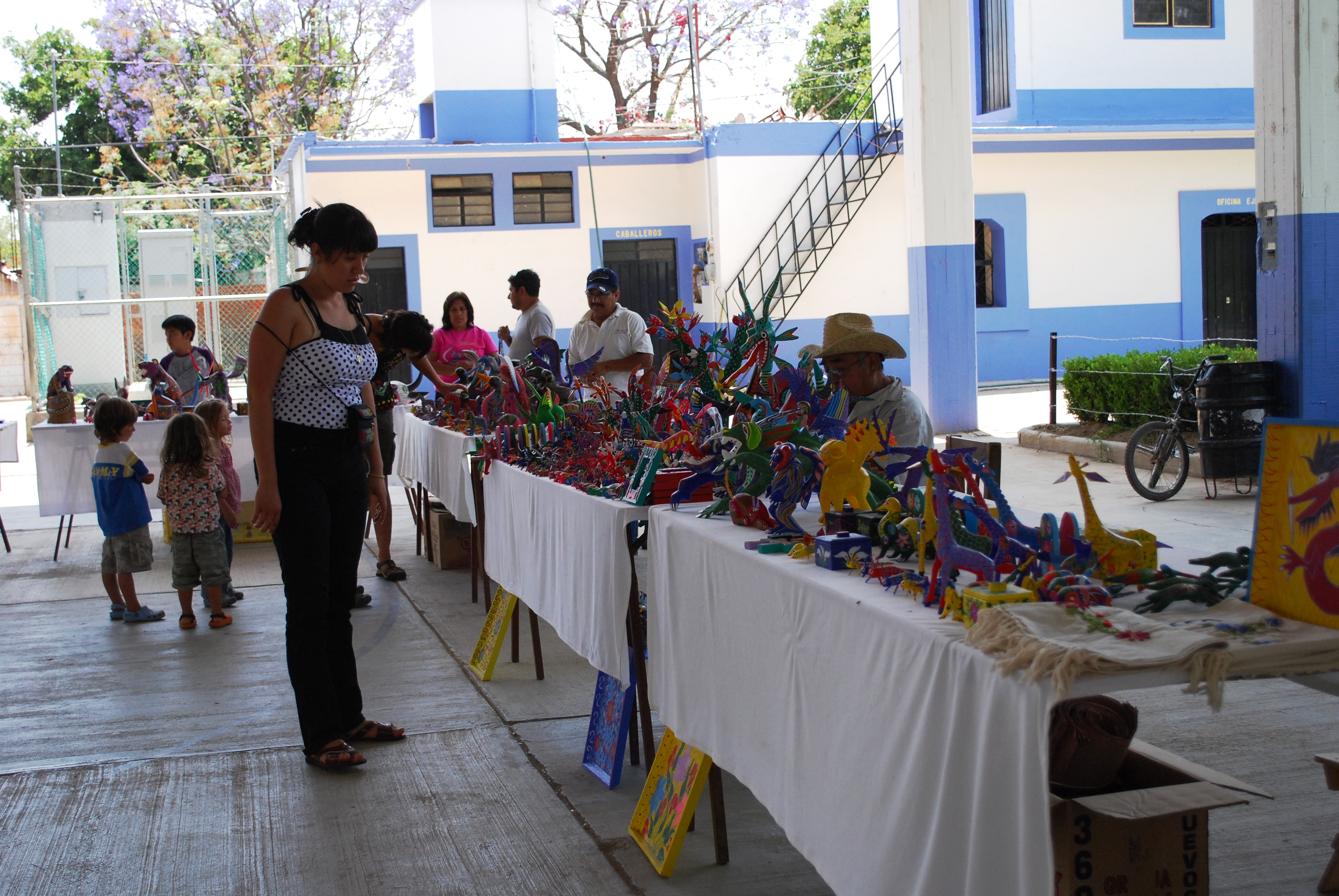
- Woman looking at Alebrijes for sale at the weekly market

- Location in Mexico
- Coordinates: 16°51′32″N 96°41′42″W
- Country: Mexico
- State: Oaxaca
- Founded: Around 1600 (modern settlement)
- Municipal Status: 1883

Government
  - Municipal President: Hugo Gómez Mendez (2008-2010)

Area
  - Municipality: 26.79 km^{2} (10.34 sq mi)
- Elevation (of seat): 1,540 m (5,050 ft)

Population (2005) Municipality
  - Municipality: 1,631
  - Seat: 1,624
- Time zone: UTC-6 (Central (US Central))
- Postal code (of seat): 71506
- Area code: 951

San Martín Tilcajete is a town and municipality located about 23 kilometres (14 mi) from the city of Oaxaca, in the state of Oaxaca, in the south of Mexico. It is part of the Ocotlán District in the south of the Valles Centrales Region

The municipality is small and rural with all but seven of its 1,631 residents living in the town (as of the 2005 Mexican Census). It is a traditional and historically Zapotec village. The Zapotec language was lost three generations ago, but the municipal government falls under the legal category of "traditional uses and customs" based on ancient community norms. The community is best known for its production of "alebrijes," which are wood carvings of real or fantastic creatures painted in bright colors and intricate patterns.

An early name for the area was Zapotitlán, referring to the large number of black sapote trees that were in the area; however, these trees are rare today. The current name is derived from the Nahuatl "Tilcaxitl" which means either "black earth depression or bowl" or "mountain of cochineal ink." The first would refer to a dark fresh water spring, which today is located between Calle de Cajete and Avenida Progreso. The latter meaning would refer to the fact that in antiquity, residents here were known for making ink and dye from the cochineal insect. Another possible origin for the name comes from "tilmas" which is a traditional type of apron worn by workmen to protect clothes underneath and to carry things. Today tilmas are most often seen as part of the costume worn for the Danza de la Pluma. The prefix of San Martin was added in honor of the bishop of Tours, France.

== History ==
Tilcajete is historically a Zapotec indigenous community, like the rest of the Ocotlán district that surrounds it. First settlements there date back to 1150 BCE. From that time to about 500–100 BCE, the entire Oaxaca Valley was filled with small independent villages. Sometime around the beginning of the Common Era, these villages began to coalesce into larger political units, via alliances or domination of neighbors. The rise of Monte Albán around 100 CE eventually finalized this process into a single hierarchy. As part of the Ocotlán territory, Tilcajete first became subject to El Mogote around 200 BCE. When this site was abandoned a short time later, the area saw the rise of another center in what is now called La Palenque. Warfare required the move of the community among three separate locations around this time. The Ocotlán region probably came under the domination of Monte Albán between 300 and 100 BCE, but some argue that the area was independent of Monte Albán until as late as 300 CE.

Charles Spencer and Elsa Redmond interpret the resistance shown by the Tilcajete polity in Ocotlán/Zimatlán not only as a reaction to Monte Albán's aggression, but also as a dynamic force that drove the evolutionary trajectory of the Monte Albán state itself.

After being integrated into the Monte Albán domination, nearby Cerro Tilcajete was established around 100 BCE as a secondary administrative center for the region. This center was primarily active between 100 BCE and 200 CE. This time corresponds to the Monte Albán II stage. The officials at Cerro Tilcajete were local administrators for the area under the command of Monte Albán. Cerro Tilcajete was the smallest of the three major secondary centers with Dainzú and El Mogote being larger. The population at the centers height is estimated to have been between 800 and 1600 people. At the end of this Monte Albán II, the administrative center was mostly abandoned. It was reoccupied during Monte Albán IIIb-IV, but this reoccupation was limited to the site's two civic-ceremonial and the terraces north and east, with the rest untouched.

The present day community dates back to about 1600, but the construction date of the parish church is not known. The town has been considered to be a municipality since 1883, when it had 858 inhabitants. Despite its Zapotec heritage, the Zapotec language was lost here about three generations ago. However, its culture remains strong enough that it was recognized as an "autonomous community" in the district of Ocotlán in 1981. The political system is registered under the "traditional uses and customs" or hierarchical system of communal duties and obligations organized through male-headed households. Male heads of households pay quotas and provide unremunerated community service.

The municipality has been in conflict with neighboring Villa de Zaachila for over thirty years over territory since boundaries were retraced unilaterally by Villa de Zaachila. The dispute has intensified over the past four years as Villa de Zaachila has moved to construct roads, clear forests and build housing on the disputed territory, which mostly has been used as communal farmland for Tilcajete for about eighty farmers. The land in dispute covers 410 hectares in areas known as Rancho Viejo, La Cuesta, Ojo de Agua, Antena, La Cantera, Loma Grande, El Puente, La Guajolota, El Pitayo and others.

== Town ==
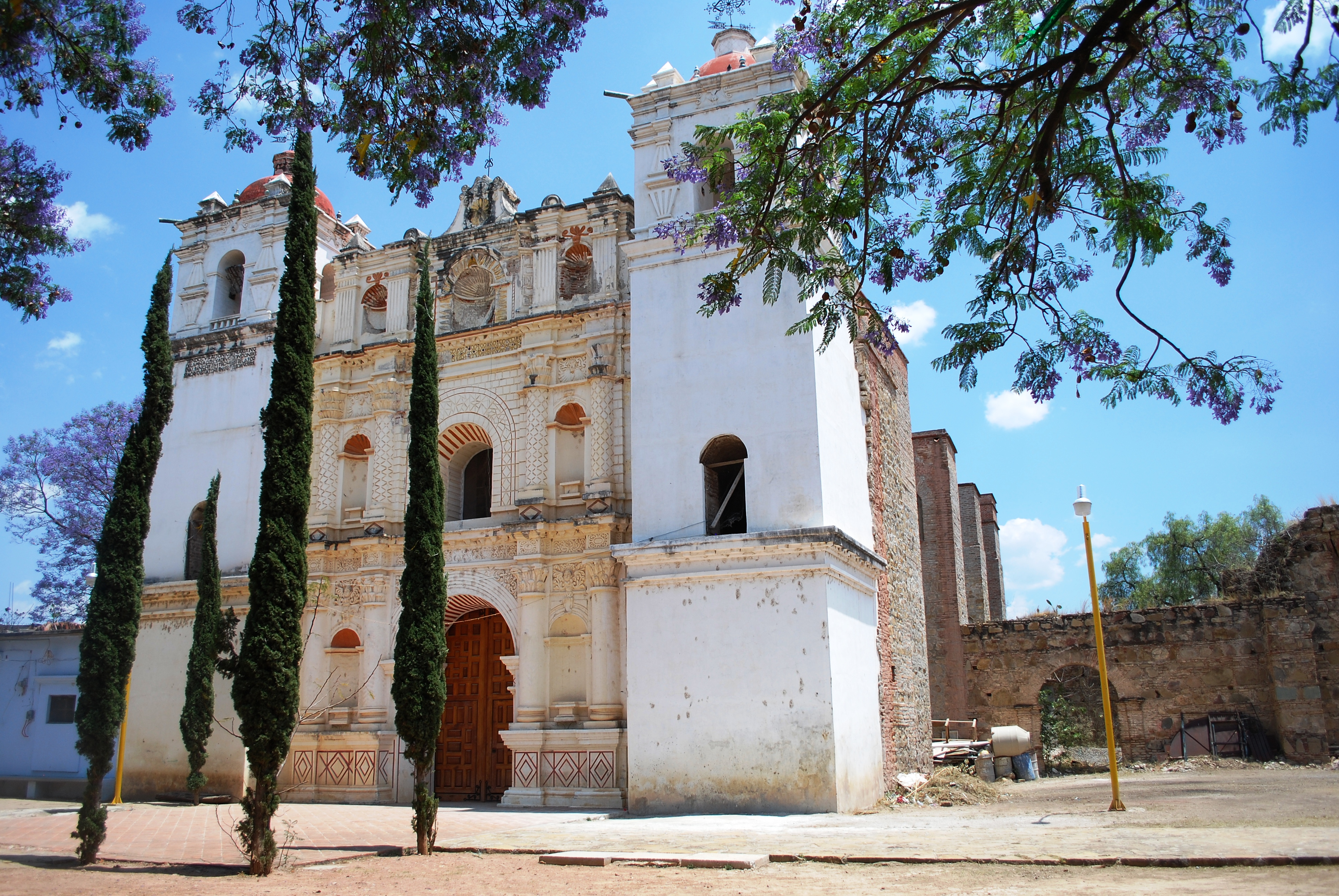
Facade of the parish of San Martin

As a traditional indigenous community, much of its governance is based on social customs and norms. Much of the policing of the community is internal, with the watching of neighbors, gossip, reputation and sometimes overnight jailing used to enforce community norms. Most of the town's residents make a living through a mixture of agriculture and the making of a craft called alebrijes. Many of the houses are decorated with these wooden creatures. These have brought national and international attention.

Despite the lack of cultural monuments aside from the parish church, the town is rich in ceremonial and festival traditions, most revolving around the Catholic faith and the promotion of crafts. The 15 January is the feast of the Señor de Esquipulas and 18 February is the feast of the Miracle of Saint Martin. These events are celebrated with traditional and popular dances, music, processions, fireworks and amusement rides. One of the first major festivals of the year is Carnival, which is celebrated the day before Ash Wednesday. The use of wood masks is common for this event, and a number of artisans here dedicate themselves to creating them. A local custom is that young men put motor oil on their bodies and wear masks to run around the streets looking for girls, trying to kiss or smear oil on them.

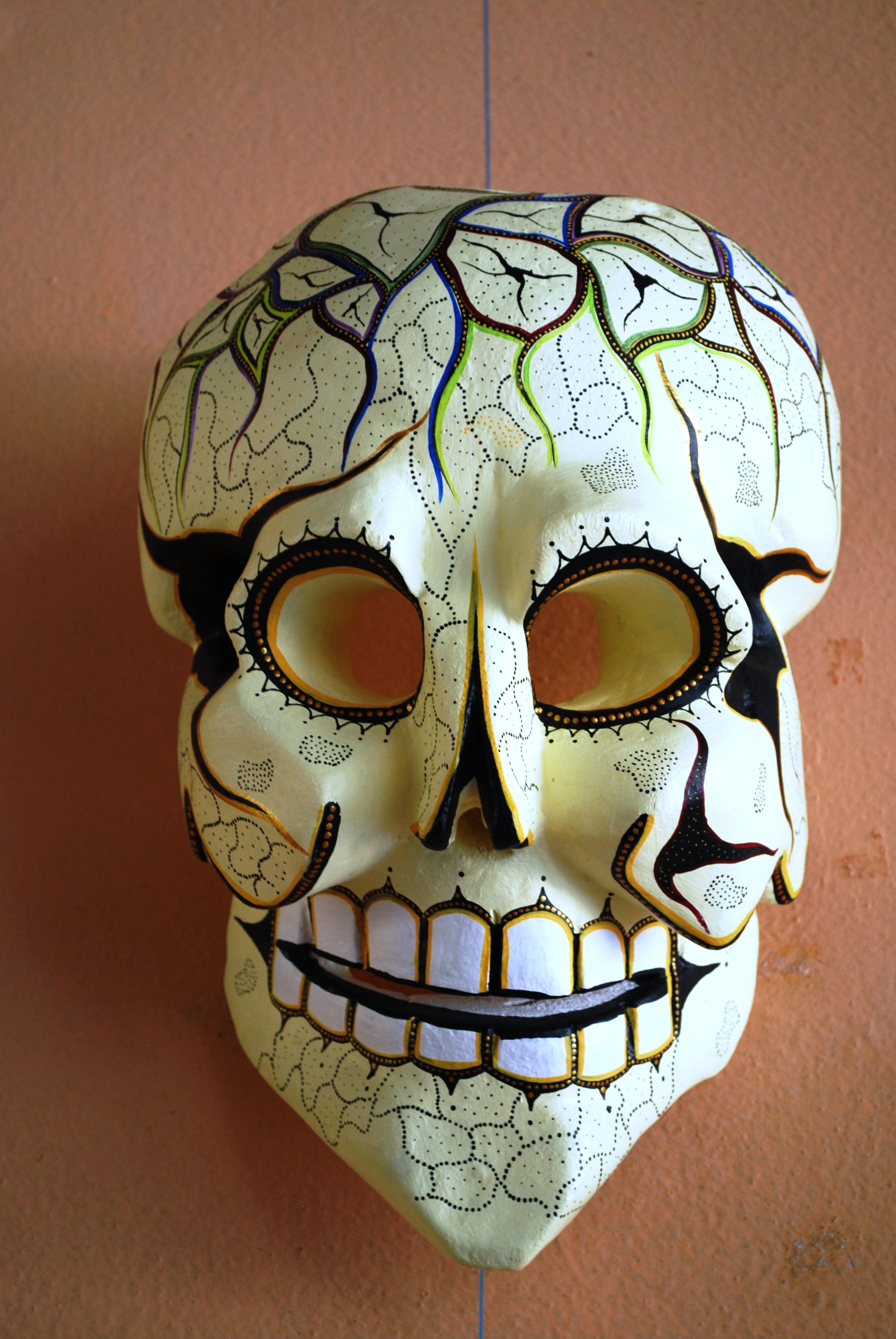
Carnival mask on display at the Museum Estatal de Artes Populares

In April is held the Feria de Alebrije or Festival of Alebrije, which is organized by Tilcajete to promote its product. The annual event began in 2008 and last nine days. In addition to alebrije sales and demonstrations, other events such as music, dance and theatre are held. There is also offerings of local and regional cuisine.

In October, the town hosts the Shin Naa Lasn or Folk Art festival, which is co-sponsored by the state of Oaxaca and the Master Craftsmen Group of Tilcajete (Grupo de Maestros Talladoes de Tilcajete). The event not only promote the alebrijes made in the town, it also invites artisans from nearby San Antonio Castillo Velasco and Ocotlán de Morelos. The event is based at the Azucena Zapoteca restaurant, which is located on the highway near the town center. One of the events of the festival is a tour guided by some of the best known sculptors of the various workshops. Local foods such as barbacoa are served, which is cooked in pit ovens, and the local youth band plays.

On 11 November is celebrated the "Fiesta Grande" which lasts for eight days honoring the town's patron saint of Martin of Tours. This event is organized by a committee chosen each year. There can be a five to six year wait to be named to the head of this committee, or mayordomo. The Fiesta Grande begins with a banquet with flowers and a procession in which one of the organizers slaughters a cow, goats and pigs to prepare for the feast. After the final Mass of the week, another get-together is held at home of the mayordomo.

== Alebrijes ==
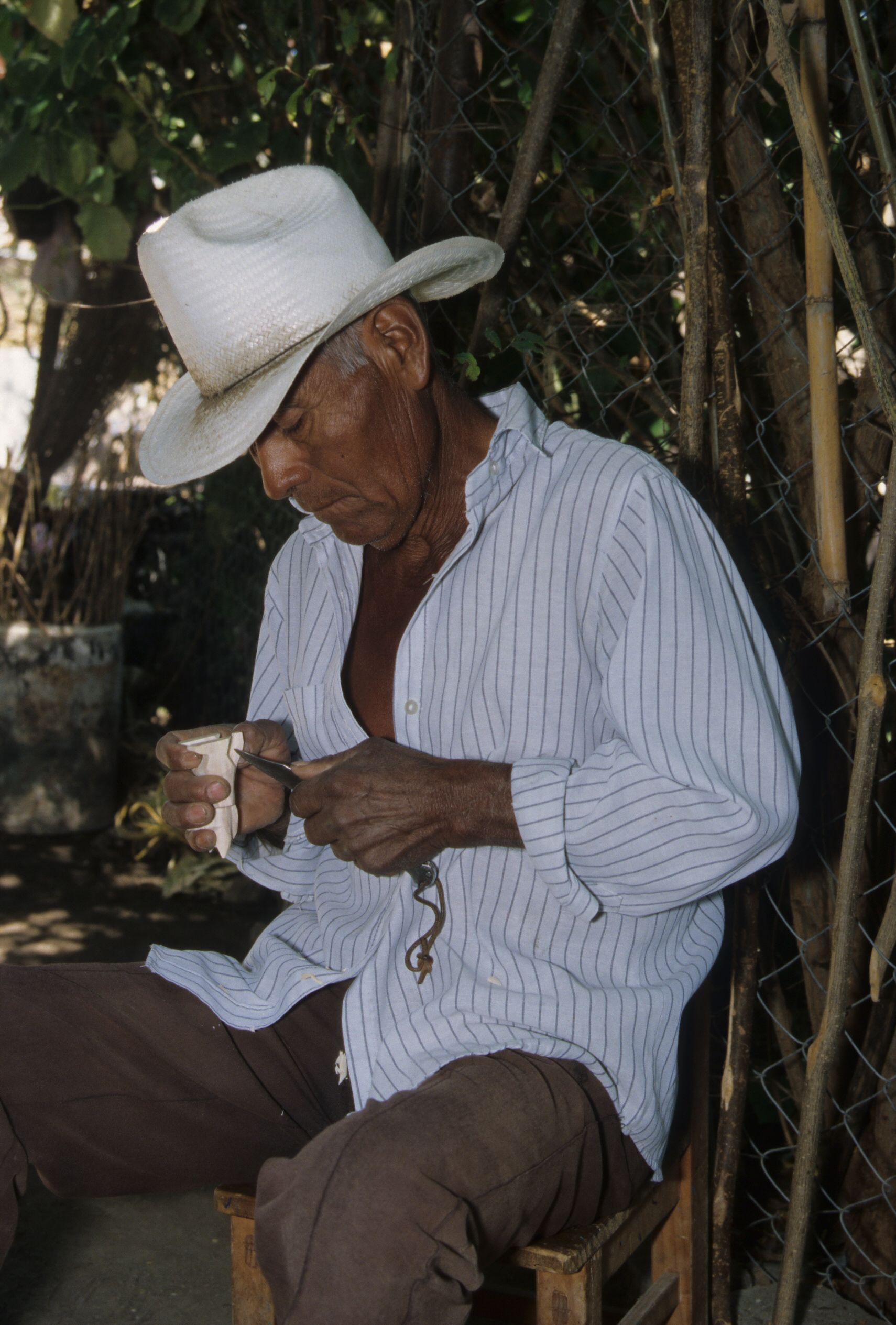
Abad Xuana Luis working on a carving

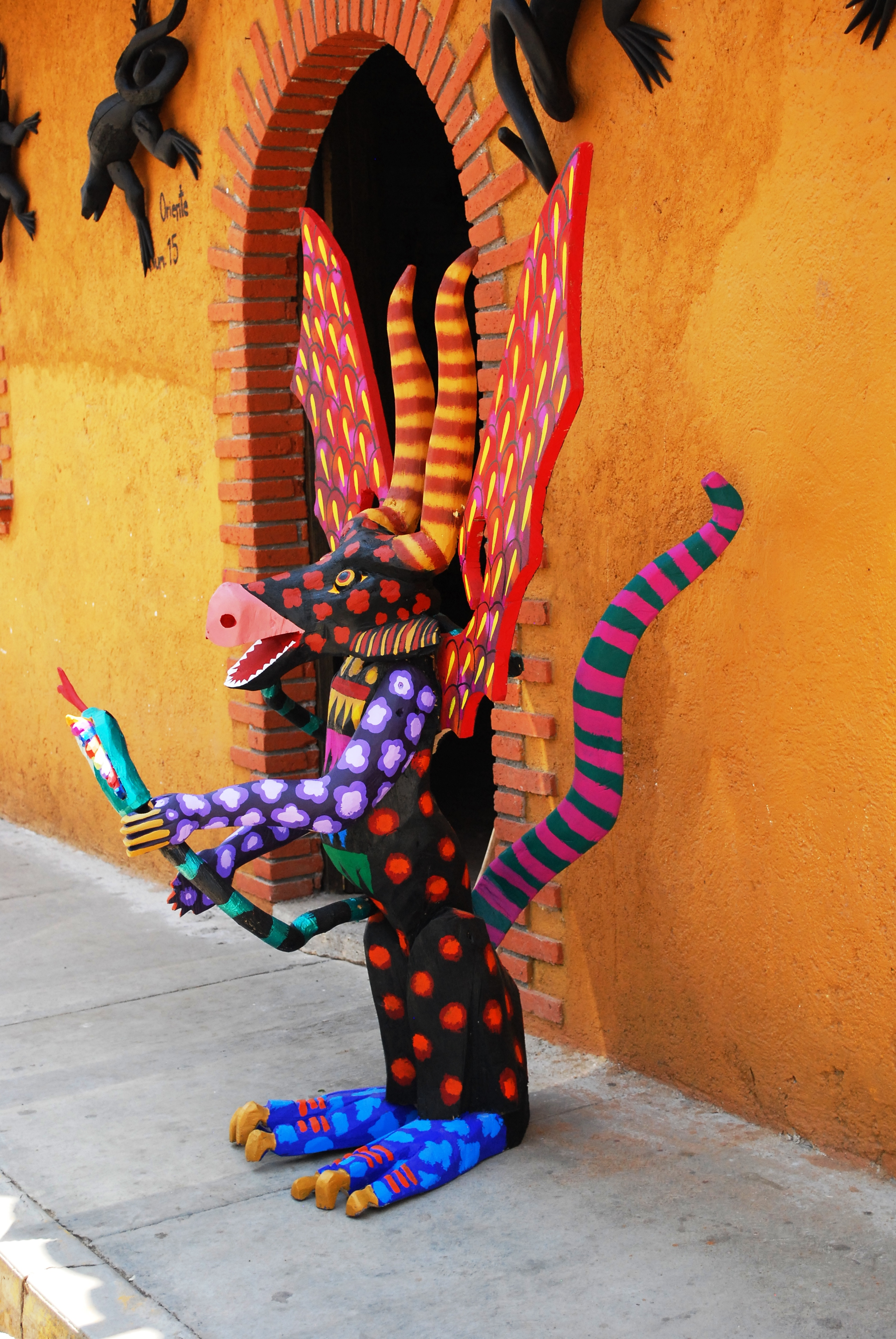
Large alebrije in front of a shop in Tilcajete

San Martín Tilcajete is known for its wood carvings of real and fantastic animals painted with bright colors and designs. It shares this fame with San Antonio Arrazola and La Unión Tejalapan. This is part of Oaxaca's tradition of being one of the leading producer folk and modern art, which is displayed in shops and galleries all over the world. The making of these animals has become the major source of income for many of the families of the municipality, using carving techniques that have been passed down from generation to generation. It has become the economic base for the community, with the streets lined with workshops that have been built into family homes in various parts of town. The best known are on the main roads around the main plaza and connecting the town to the nearby highway, but many also exist on the back streets. Many will give demonstrations. For many families, the making of these figures not only provides an economic base, but helps to keep generations together, with aspects of the productions divided among the different generations and sexes. Workshops here have had their pieces sold in shops in the city of Oaxaca, other parts of Mexico and internationally, but prices are substantially lower in the town itself.

The brightly painted wooden figures now carry the name "alebrije" but they are a mixture of two craft traditions, one ancient and one more recent. The Zapotecs of Oaxaca have carved representations of animal from wood and other materials for centuries. Certain animals were important as totems and some were carved to use as hunting decoys.(jacabo) The carving of animals from the wood of the copal tree, native to the area, but as of at least 50 or so years ago, they were principally carved as toys for children. At the beginning of the 20th century, the focus of woodcarving was more focused on utilitarian items and masks for celebrations such as Carnival, all of which are still made.

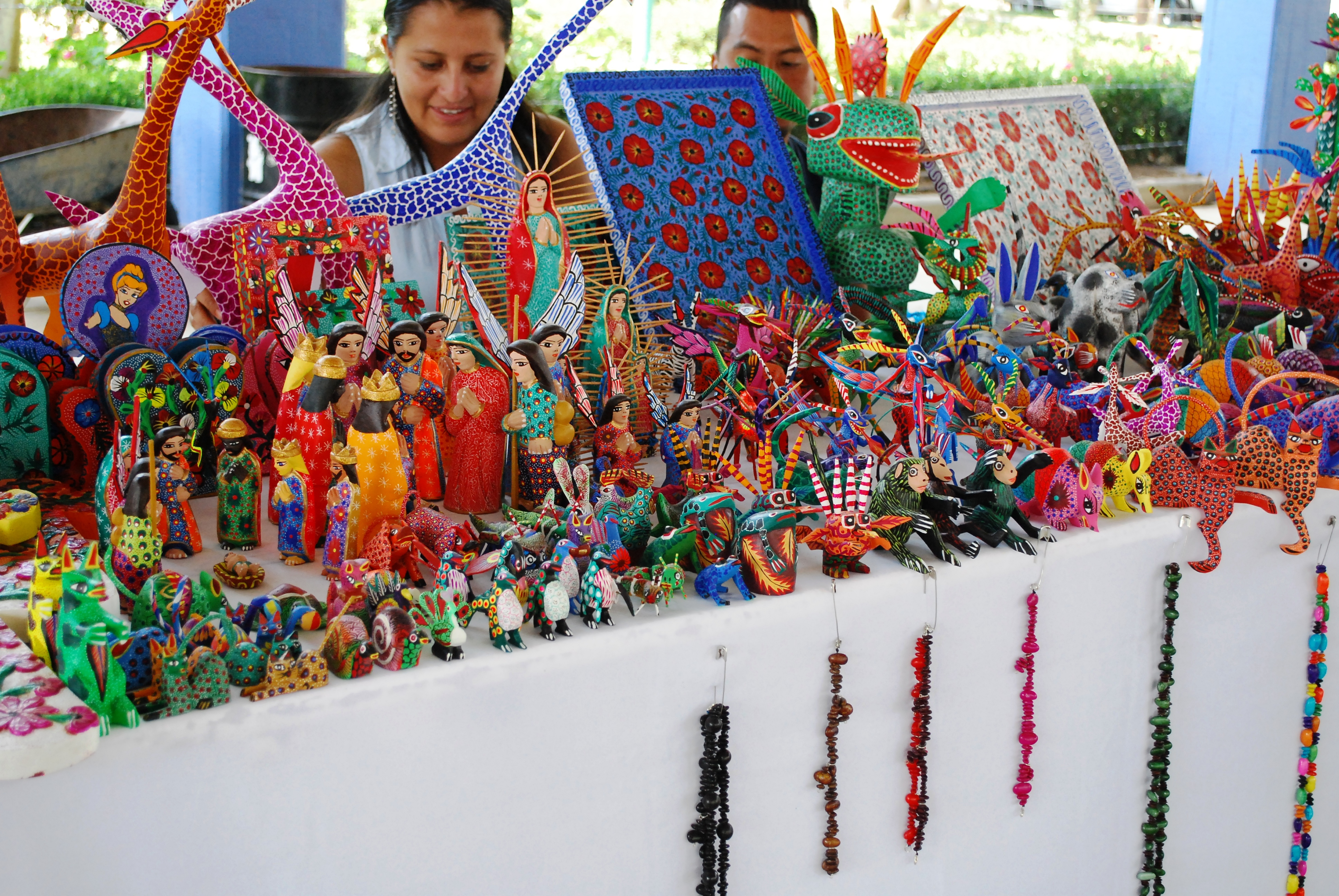
Selling alebrijes in Tilcajete

The creation of fantastic and fantastically colored creatures as well as the name alebrije come from the work of a Mexico City area man named Pedro Linares. According to the Linares family, Pedro fell seriously ill in the 1930s and during his fever-induced hallucinations, envisioned fantastic creatures as well as the name "alebrije." He was a Mixe from Central Valleys area of Oaxaca, but he created and established the creation of alebrijes using cardboard and wood in Mexico City. This original tradition continues in Mexico City with several later generations of the Linares family.

Pedro Linares had family in Arrazola and demonstrated his designs to them during visits. One of the first to imitate these designs was Manuel Jimenez, but the designs were imitated by carving the traditional copal wood of the area. As the tradition of carving this wood had no name, the name "alebrije" began to be applied to the copal wood version. In San Martin Tilcajete, the tradition of wood carving was strong as well, but it was also rivaled by other crafts such as embroidered shirts, blouses and dresses as late as the 1960s to 1980s. Around this time, only about four families were involved full-time in the making of alebrijes, with the rest dividing their time between the making of various crafts and agriculture. In the 1980s, the popularity of alebrijes, along with other Oaxacan crafts skyrocketed and spurred the creation of workshops in Tilcajete, allowing for the development of sales and talent. During this time, the economy of the town shifted to craft making and away from agriculture and sending family members to other places to work. This shift has not only allowed more residents to stay in their hometown, it has raised living standards. Except for a short lived decline in the latter 1980s, demand for the figures has continued to grow. The most common figures are of real animals, such as dogs, cats, armadillos, iguanas, with more exotic animals such as giraffes, elephants, zebras and others introduced to meet client demand. Fantastic creatures, most commonly dragons and winged horses are also made. More imaginative artists have branched out to plants such as purple palm trees and yellow cacti, as well as jewelry boxes, picture frames and other common use products, painted in alebrije style.

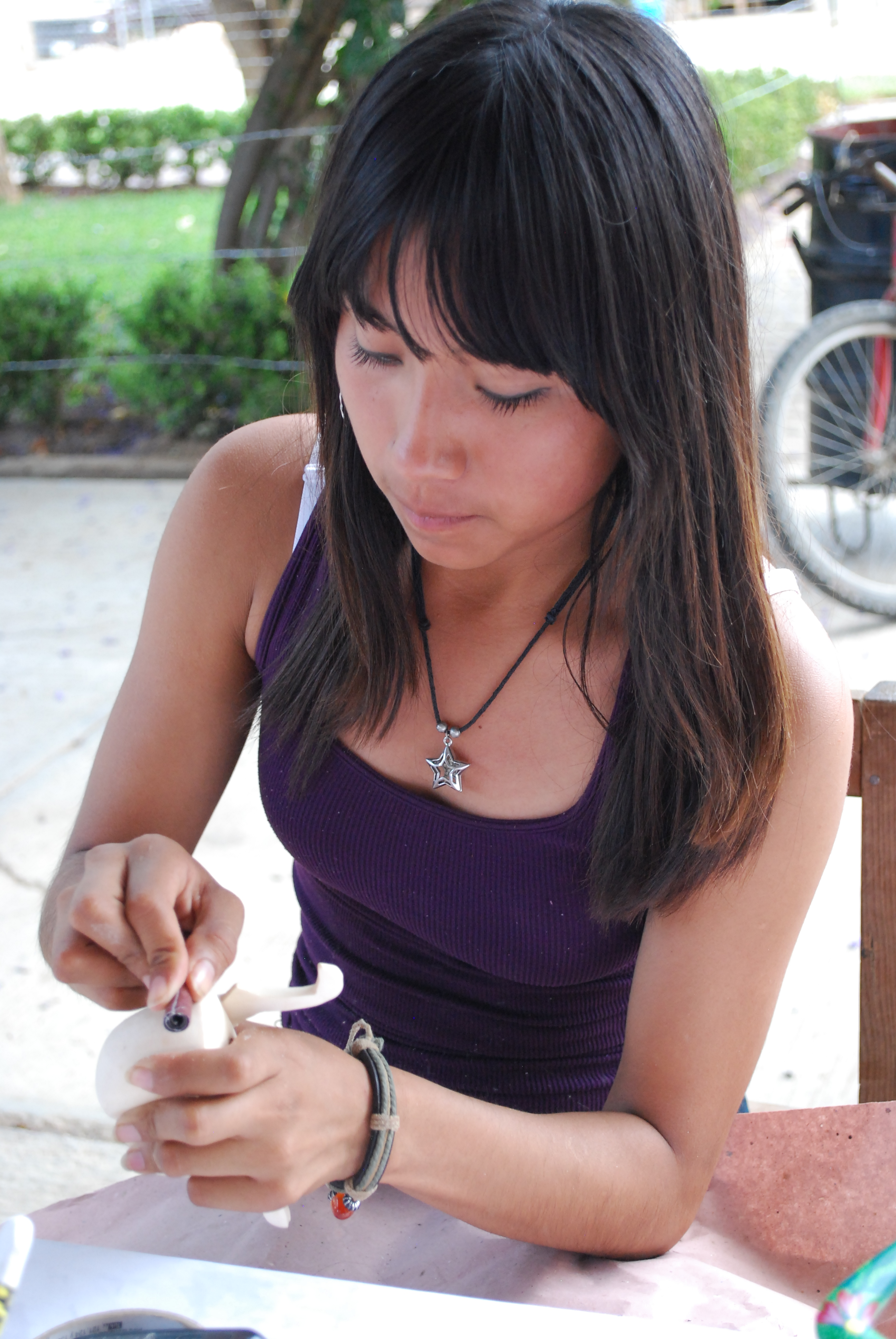
Young woman sanding an alebrije

While figures from Tilcajete and other towns have been sent to all parts of the Mexican Republic, the United States and Europe, they can still be hard to find outside of Oaxaca and, if found, quite expensive. The figures were discovered by international tourists in the 1990s, but since then the popularity has grown sufficiently to allow the town of Tilcajete to build a reputation along with a number of its residents. The alebrije market is divided into two levels, the production of unique, high-quality, labor-intensive pieces and the production of repetitive, average quality and inexpensive pieces. Those who have produced exceptionally fine pieces have gained reputations as artists, commanding high prices.

Some of better known artisans in the town include the Fuentes family and Delfino Gutierrez. Efrain and Silvia Fuentes, along with their family have a good reputation among woodcarvers in Oaxaca. Efrain began carving at a very young age and at only 13, was featured in an exhibit in Santa Fe, N.M. The best pieces produced by this family are most often bought by foreigners. Delfino Gutierrez is known for his original designs, specializing in free-form elephants, frogs, turtles, armadillos and other animals. His works have been sold in stores in Chicago, California, New York and Israel.

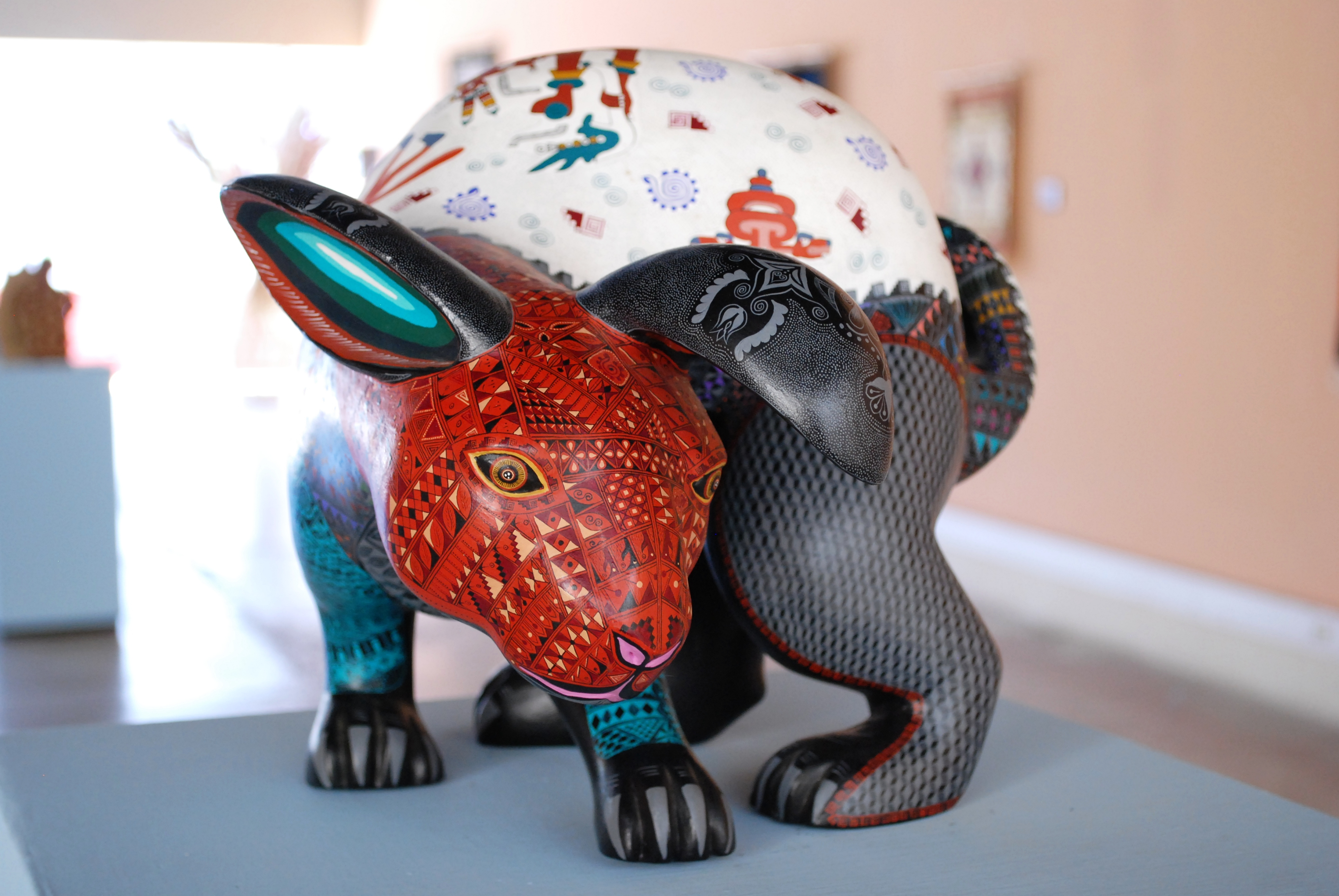
Rabbit figure by Jacobo Angeles at the Museum Estatal de Arte Popular in San Bartolo Coyotepec.

The most successful artisan from the town is Jacobo Angeles, whose work has been displayed in The Smithsonian, Chicago's National Museum of Mexican Art and museums, art colleges and galleries in various parts of the world. Like other carvers, Angeles began carving at a young age, taught by his family and elders from Tilcajete and other villages. Angeles' work is distinguished by the fact that he uses only naturally derived paints and materials for his figures. Paints are derived from fruits, vegetables, plants, tree barks, clay and insects. The figures also more closely reflect Zapotec culture and tradition, painting designs derived from sources such as the friezes of the Mitla archeological site and ancient pictographic symbols for phenomena such as waves, mountains and fertility. Angeles also travels extensively to promote Oaxacan folk art, teaching in various educational venues and speaking at art exhibitions.

Prices of the pieces vary according to size, originality and the quality of the work. The tradition here is to use branches of a tree locally called "copal," which is often obtained from the local hills by the craftsmen. A machete is used for the rough form, then smaller knives until the desired fineness is reached. The only time a modern tool, a chainsaw, is used, is to obtain the wood and to level a base for a large figures. The capricious shapes that copal wood can take often determines what is made. Male and female copal trees have different characteristics, which influence what is made. A detailed outline is drawn on the bark, defining the image with greater clarity and detail. The sculpting in earnest then begins. The wood is soft and damp when first cut, making it easier for craftsmen to shape, then is dried in the sun before being sanded. The carving alone takes up to a month. The figure is then left to dry for up to ten months, depending on its overall size and thickness. Modern paints are most often used as they provide better color and durability, as it resists fading. The traditional paint was aniline, which can fade with time and repeated cleanings.

Because of the high production of wood crafts, copal wood is becoming scarce due to overexploitation. Copal trees are small and do not yield much wood, and almost every branch is used for alebrije production. Residents of Tilcajete must walk farther into the woods to locate it, or they must bring it in from other villages, although carvers prefer local wood. The demand for copal wood has led to illegal and clandestine harvests in protected forests. The problem is grave enough that the federal government states that most of the figures are made with illegally obtained wood. There are several reforestation and other projects designed to make the use of copal wood more sustainable. The trees, which grow well with minimal care in the dry climate, are being planted for harvest in about six to seven years. One of these reforestation projects is headed by the Rodolfo Morales Foundation. People from Tilcajete spend the last Sunday of July, which is during the rainy season, planting trees. Another way to make the wood harvest more sustainable is to cut only branches from the tree, instead of the entire tree. However, artisans’ decision about how to obtain copal wood is based more on price, quality and reliability of the supplier. They will pay more for ecologically sustainable wood if they can pass this cost onto the consumer.

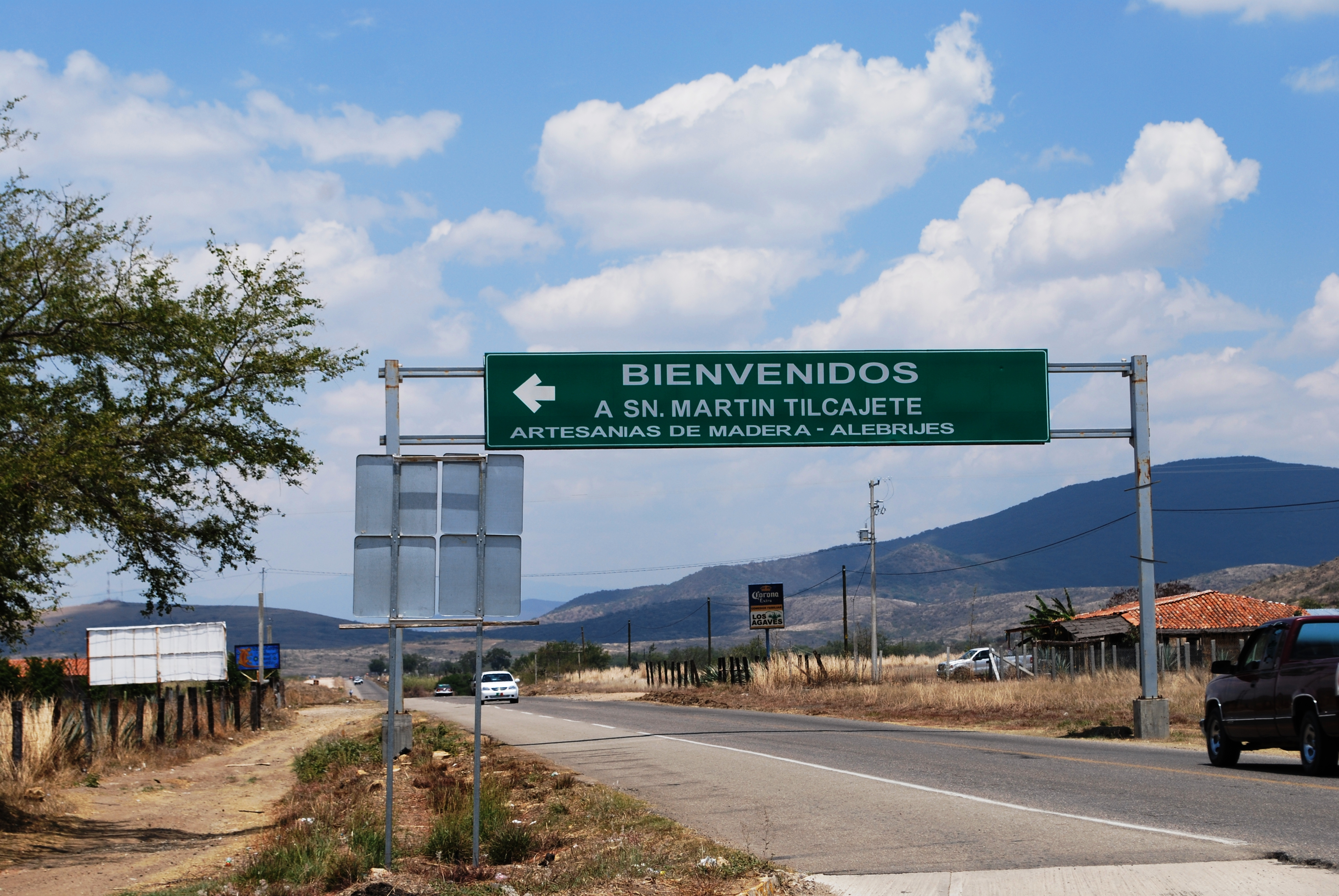
Sign for Tilcajete on Highway 175

Promotion and protection of the product is a significant concern, spurring the creation of fairs, markets and legal protections. Every Friday on the main square is the "tianguis del alebrije" or weekly market selling wooden figures. This event allows visitors to purchase items from local craftsmen directly. There are usually also vendors selling other local products such as ice cream as well. The Feria del Alebrije invites more than 100 vendors who sell alebrijes, textiles, local dishes, artwork and local alcoholic beverages. The fair lasts for about nine days and has been held since 2008. The Master Craftsmen Group of Tilcajete (Grupo de Maestros Talladoes de Tilcajete) includes Hedilberto Olivera, Emilia Calvo, Roberta Ángeles, Juventino Melchor, Martin Melchor, Margarito Melchor Fuentes, Margarito Melchor Santiago, José Olivera Pérez, Jesús Melchor García, Inocente Vásquez, María Jiménez, Cira Ojeda, Jacobo and María Ángeles, Justo Xuana, Victor Xuana, Rene Xuana, Abad Xuana, Flor and Ana Xuana, Rogelio Alonso, who works in Papier-mâché and Doris Arellano, who is a painter. The group is also working to create a group trademark for their work because of the introduction of imitation alebrijes from China. The trademark is to be called "Tonas de Oaxaca, Figuras de Madera" with over 39 craftsmen from Tilcajete, Arrazola and San Pedro Taviche already completing the requirements to participate.

== The municipality ==
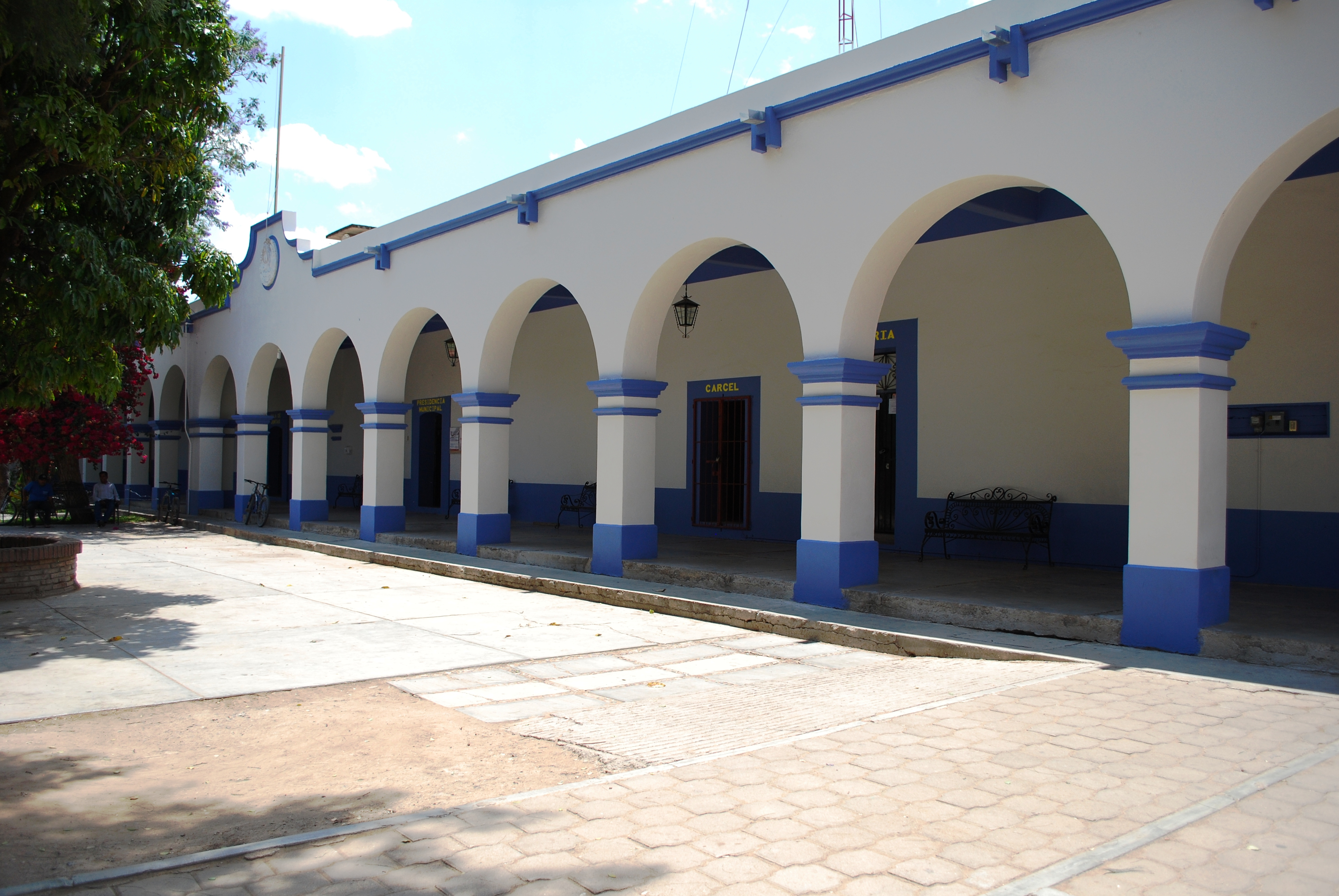
Municipal palace

As municipal seat, the town of San Martín Tilcajete is the governing authority over the municipality of the same name. However, this municipality has only one other locality, called La Cumbre del Cerrito, where only seven people live as of 2005. The rest of the municipal population of 1631 lives in the town proper. There are no people here who speak an indigenous language. The municipality borders the municipalities of San Bartolo Coyotepec, Santa Catarina Quiaré, Santo Tomás Jalieza, Ocotlán de Morelos, San Juan Chilateca and Santa Ana Zegache and covers an area of 26.79 square kilometres (10.34 sq mi).

The geography of the municipality varies between small plains and hills/small mountains. The most notable elevations include La Loma Grande, Buenavista, Los Mogotes, Cerro Chile, Teta de María Sanchez and La Doncella. There is little surface water here. The main river is the Verde River which crosses the town. Other surface water consists of arroyos that flow during the rainy season. Most potable water for the population comes from two deep wells. The climate is temperate with little variation in temperature throughout the year. Wild vegetation is scarce but there are still trees such as junipers, Montezuma cypress, jacarandas and others. Arid zone plants such as mesquite and maguey can also be found. Equally there is little wildlife, which mostly consists of small mammals such as rabbits along with some species of birds.

The municipality contains deposits of gold, silver, iron, coal, lead, copper, zinc, antinomy, titanium, asbestos and various minerals.

Most of the population is engaged in farming either full or part-time. Principle crops include corn, beans, chickpeas, castor oil plant and peanuts. Traditionally, Tilcajete was reliant on subsistence agriculture to meet local needs and with surpluses sold at regional markets. Agriculture has become less viable, which is one of the reasons why families have turned to crafts and sending members to other places to work. Agriculture is still widely practiced as it provides many of the basic staples and has cultural importance. However, agriculture can be risky here is that it is rainfall dependent. Also, the soil is mostly of decayed volcanic rock matter which forms a thin layer on the surface. Livestock includes cattle, pigs, horses, goats and sheep. A portion of the population in involved in construction, mostly masonry. However, it is the production of alebrijes which bring national and international attention. These economic activities employ over 84% of those who live here. The craft trade has spurred tourism on a small scale. Those who do not work in the municipality generally go to Mexico City and the United States to send back remittances. Most migrant workers are male but unmarried women also go, mostly to Mexico City to work as maids, returning to the town for marriage.

Cerro Tilcajete is an archeological site located 18.5 kilometres (11.5 mi) southwest of Ocotlán de Morelos. The site covers 280 square kilometres (110 sq mi) and includes the modern municipalities of San Martín Tilcajete, Santo Tomás Jalieza, Santa Ana Zegache and Ocotlán. It is located atop the northernmost of the three ridges allowing for views of the central valley and portions of the Ocotlán alluvium. The site is extensively terraced but there is no evidence of irrigation canals, indicating that food was grown on the valley floor below.

== Bibliography ==
- Elson, Christina M. (2003). Elites at Cerro Tilcajete: A secondary center in the Valley of Oaxaca, Mexico (PhD thesis). University of Michigan. Docket AAT 3079438.
