= San Antonino Castillo Velasco =

San Antonino
- Town and municipality
- San Antonino Castillo Velasco
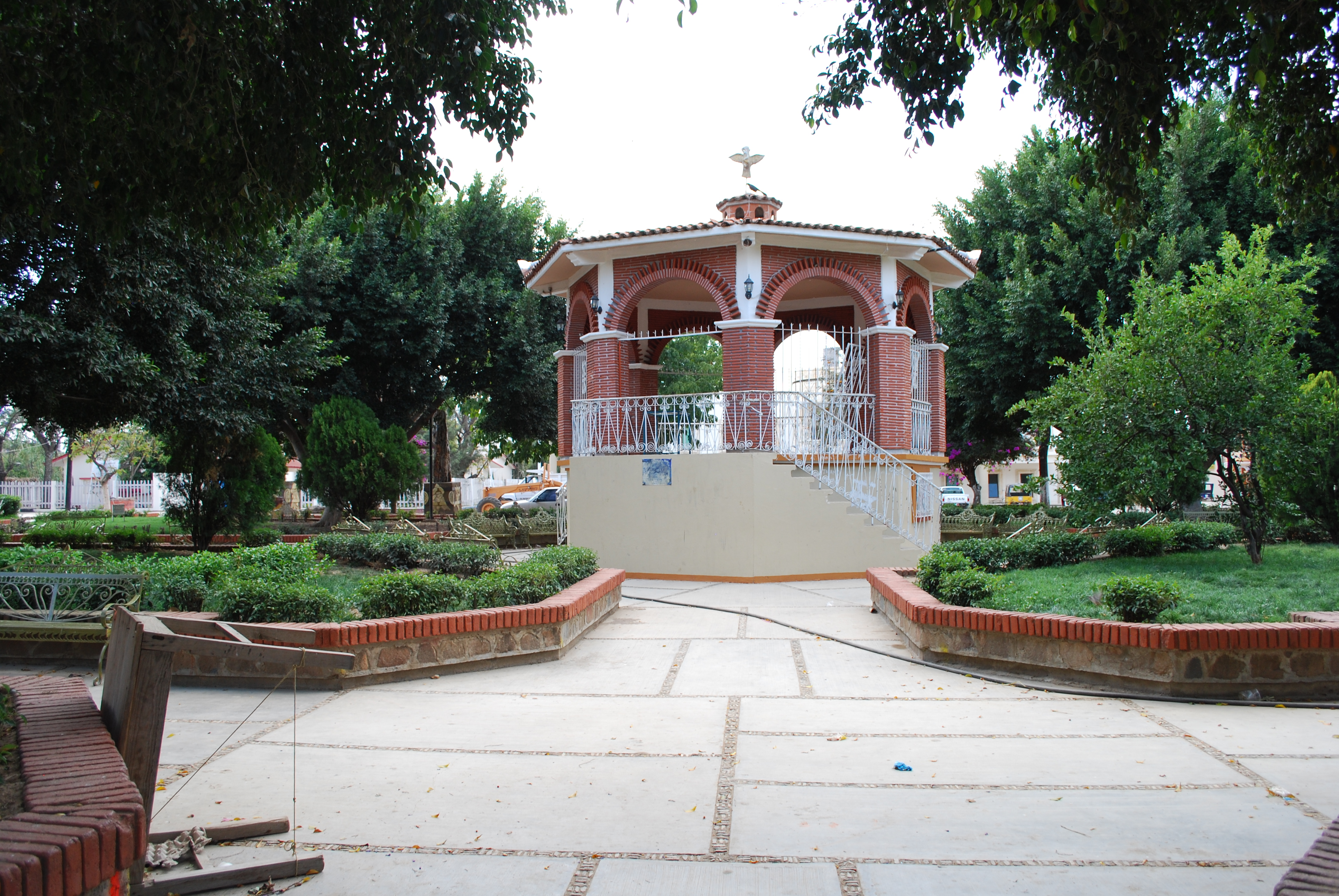
- Kiosk in the main square

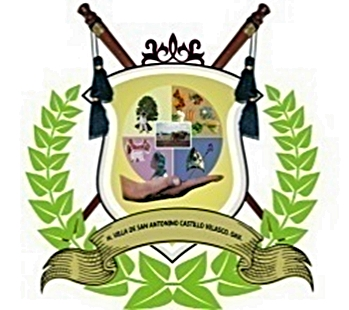
- Coat of arms

- Location in Mexico
- Coordinates: 16°48′11″N 96°41′02″W
- Country: Mexico
- State: Oaxaca
- Founded: 1649

Government
  - Municipal President: Abraham Francisco Raymundo (2008-2010)

Area
  - Municipality: 26.79 km^{2} (10.34 sq mi)
- Elevation (of seat): 1,480 m (4,860 ft)

Population (2005) Municipality
  - Municipality: 4,829
  - Seat: 4,564
- Time zone: UTC-6 (Central (US Central))
- Postal code (of seat): 71520
- Area code: 951

San Antonino Castillo Velasco is a town and municipality located south of the city of Oaxaca, in the Mexican state of Oaxaca. It is part of the Ocotlán District in the south of the Valles Centrales Region Its population is less than 5,000, but it was the scene of a number of violent confrontations in the 2000s. The town is known for its crafts, especially fine embroidery and items made with a flower known as flor inmortal ("immortal flower"), so called because it does not lose its color when it is dried. The name San Antonino is in honor of Anthony of Padua, who is the town's patron saint. “Castillo Velasco” (sometimes “Castillo Velazco”) was added in honor of José María Castillo Velasco, who was born here in 1820 and played important roles in the Reform War and French Intervention in Mexico.

== History ==
The town was founded in 1649 by Nicolás Hernández, Martín Ángel Toledo and Manuel Salmerón on lands which had been granted to their families earlier in the colonial era. The settlement was officially declared a town in 1889.

Access to water has been a problem for farmers here since the 1960s, when severe restrictions on access were placed, and the sinking of groundwater dried up almost half of the wells. Farmers complain that the government is unfairly restricting access while businesses and housing divisions are given freer access. The Coordinadora de Pueblos Unidos por la Defensa del Agua is based in the town in order to protect farmers’ rights. This group claims that the lack of water is making the farming of flowers and vegetables untenable and forcing farmers to migrate to the United States. The water commission says that many farmers’ use of water is excessive and the restrictions are necessary.

The early years of the 21st century have been a time of conflict and violence for the municipality. The police commander of the municipality was assassinated in 2003. The events of the 2006 Oaxaca protests have had serious impact on the municipality, as it was listed among the twenty-nine municipalities classified to be in social and political conflict by state electoral authorities. In 2006, the municipal palace was taken by APPO sympathizers who accused the municipal government of serious irregularities and corruption. A general assembly was called and the disavowal of municipal government was approved, replacing it with the “Ayuntamiento Popular de San Antonino Castillo Velasco” (People's City Council of San Antonino Castillo Velasco).

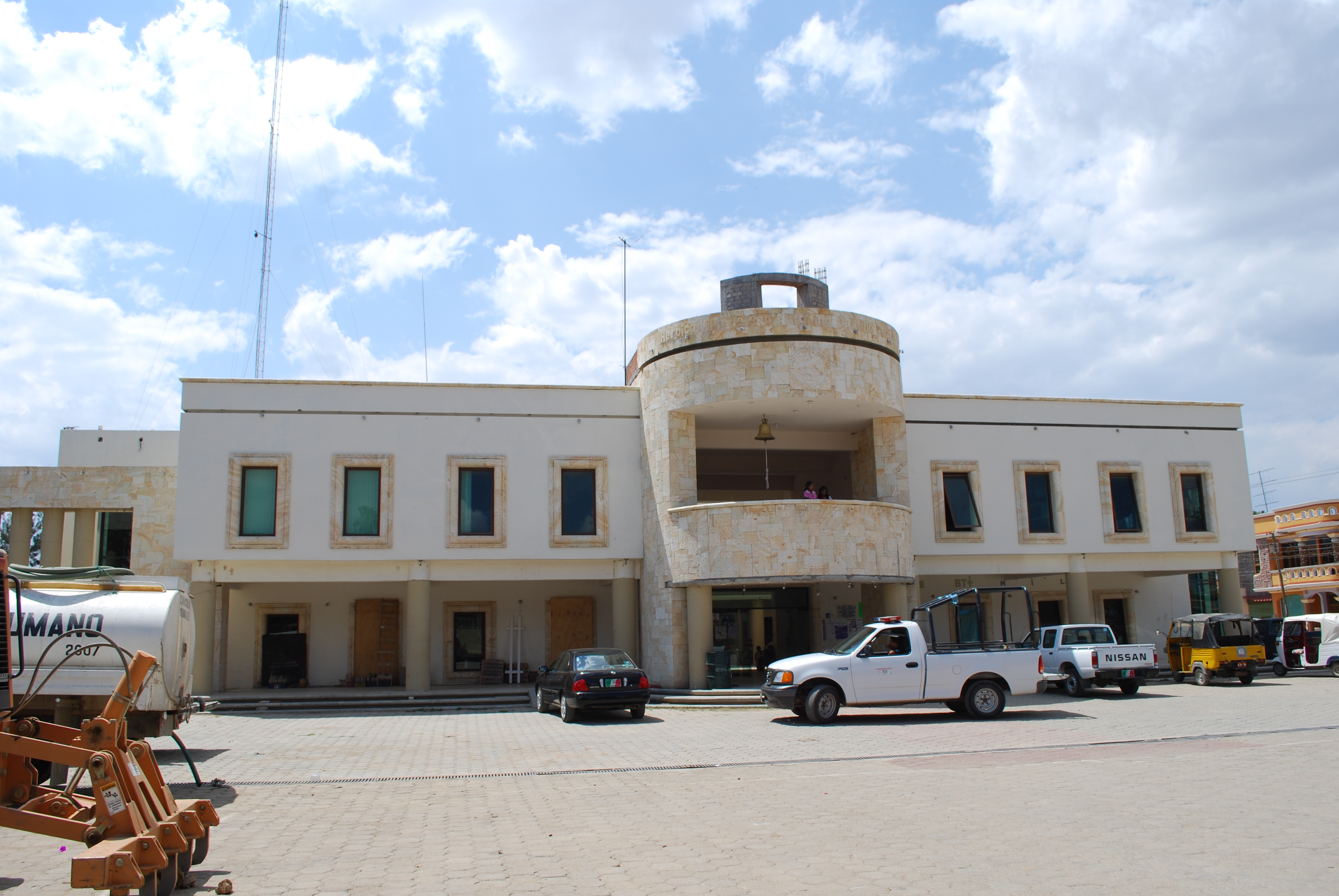
Municipal palace

This government immediately declared sympathy with APPO and Section 22 of the SNTE teachers’ union. This event divided the residents of the community, but with a majority supporting the new government and APPO. A rock smashed the window of the main door of the house of Gonzalo Alonso García, who was recognized by the PRI as the municipal president in 2006, but most of the violence since 2006 has been blamed on the ousted municipal government of Joel López Sánchez and the PRI political party which has ruled Oaxaca since 1929. In 2006, a 49-year-old voluntary policeman was killed by gunshots. The event was blamed on PRI sympathizers although no one was arrested. The People's council continued to govern and occupy the municipal palace, with a number of supporters protecting the building at night. In 2007, there was an attempt to dislodge these supporters during the night with one assault at around midnight and the other at about 5 am. The leader of the People's City Council, Juan Valentín Aguilar Pérez, stated that the 100 or so PRI supporters were led by the former municipal president personally. The attempt was not successful. The confrontation between the People's Council and PRI resulted in over 25 injured, including Aguilar Pérez and three members of Radio Calenda. The PRI forces detained about a dozen or so, who were released later after intervention by the federal government. Later, Oaxaca state authorities arrested four PRI sympathizers accused of participating in the 2007 assault on occupiers of the municipal palace and the illegal detainment of several protesters during the event. This situation remained until the municipal elections of 2007, which required extra security.

However, the violence has not completely ended. Radio Calenda (http://www.radiocalenda.com/radio.html) is one of a number of “community radio stations” which operate in rural areas of Mexico, often without a license. However, Calenda has an operating license. Most of the staff at the radio station are volunteers. The station reports local news and also broadcasts in local indigenous languages. The station has operated since 2006, when it was part of the social uprisings. Since that time, it has been a target of pro-PRI forces, especially those loyal to the former municipal president. In November 2008, the radio station was assaulted. Since then a number of the assailants have been arrested but threats continue. The Asociacion Mundial de Radios Comunitarias de Mexico (World Association of Community Radio of Mexico) or AMARC has issued a plea to federal and state authorities to protect the station and arrest the former municipal president, who they claim is behind the attacks.

Since the early 2000s, there has been a boundary dispute between San Antonino and Ocotlán de Morelos. At that time, Ocotlán sold an area called “Barratillo de Ocotlán” to San Antonino, but the exact boundaries of the land sold have been in dispute ever since. In 2003, there was a confrontation between the two municipalities over that area, but a more significant one occurred in 2009. The confrontation was sparked by the placement of a sign on Federal Highway 175 by the Secretariat of Communication and Transportation and the municipality of San Antonino to indicate the latter's existence to travelers. However, Ocotlán claims the land on which the sign was being erected. The confrontation resulted in injuries to both parties and the use of tear gas by the state police to break it up.

The social unrest since 2006 has hurt local craftsmen as tourists and other buyers are scared away by the violence.

== The town and its crafts ==
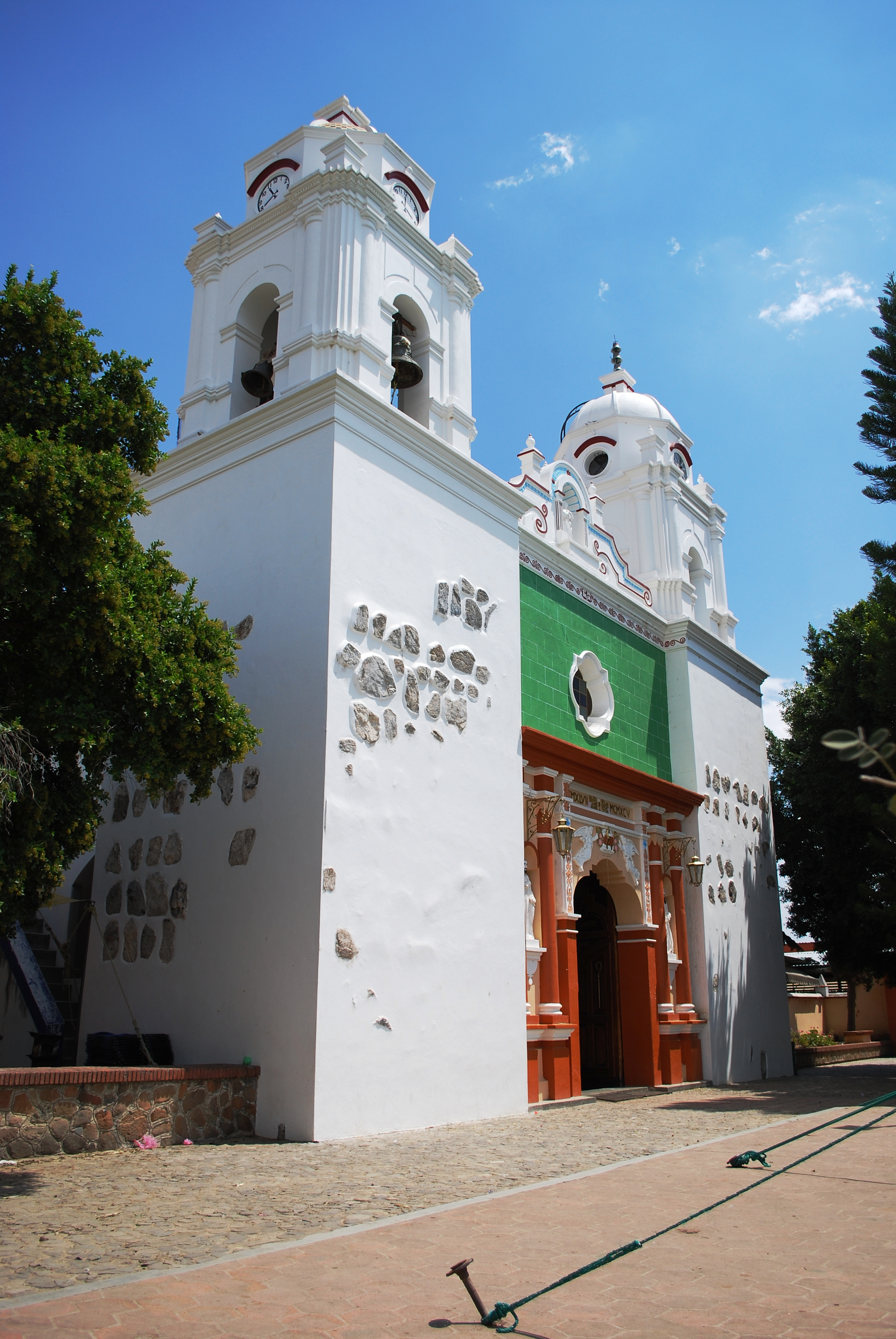
Facade of the parish church

San Antonio is a Zapotec community, which is a suburb of Ocotlán de Morelos. The parish church was built in the 17th century and dedicated to Anthony of Padua. This church is the focus of several religious celebrations including the feast of the Señor de la Sacristía on 19 February. The Day of the Dead is also an important commemoration here with music and offerings laid on the tombs of the dead.

The town of San Antonino participates in the annual Martes de Brujas which takes place in San Bartolo Coyotepec. Women come to sell tamales and atole, which recalls the origins of the commemoration, when women served these foods to men working on the construction of a church. This event takes place during the period of Lent.

The town also has a “casa de cultura,” literally “house of culture,” called the Casa De La Cultura El Jardín del Valle. This is a cultural center for residents, which offers classes in theatre, music, sculpture, painting and ceramics. It also hosts exhibits.

There are two market days, Friday and Sunday. On these days, San Antonino's locally renowned breads are more available although they are often sold out by the afternoon. While craft stores are not common here like in other towns, crafts such as embroidered clothing and items made with dried flowers can be seen on these days.

The two main crafts of this town are embroidered clothing and arrangements and decorations with dried flowers. Most of the clothing which is embroidered is for women, but there are embroidered shirts for men as well. The dresses are the most expensive and most coveted and are used mostly by indigenous women of the area. They are often called “Oaxacan wedding dresses” and are marked by their intricate designs with animas and flowers. These dresses sell at a minimum of US$100. The embroidery style is called “a ver si puedes” (Let's see if you can) or “hazme si puedes” (Make me if you can). Both names refer to the difficulty of the embroidery due to the large number of very small elements. Most embroiderers learn the craft from their mothers and grandmothers, with larger items such as dresses taking months of work to complete. Pieces of this style are on display at the Textile Museum of Oaxaca. The museum was organized by sisters Reina Cornelio Sánchez and Antonina Cornelio Sánchez. The purpose of the museum is to promote the craft and appreciation of it.

One other craft associated with the town are arrangements made with a flower called the flor inmortal ("immortal flower"). The flower is called this because it does not lose its color when it is dried. These arrangements were originally made for religious purposes and still many objects made with this flower are of the religious type. Many of the orders for crafts made with the flor inmortal are for religious ceremonies, such as festivals for patron saints, such as church decorations. The flower primarily comes in three colors, yellow, red and white. Many of those who produce works in the flower, grow the primary material themselves, which takes about four months to mature. Crops are harvested in the fall, so the flower appears in abundance for Day of the Dead and the annual Noche de Rábanos (Night of the Radishes) festival in the city of Oaxaca.

One other craft here is basketry, especially those items made in association with flor inmortal arrangements.

== The municipality ==
As municipal seat, the town of San Antonino Castillo Velazco is the governing authority over the communities of Lachicuvica, Esquina de la Piedra, La Azucena and El Zompantle, as well as unsettled lands with total an area of 33.17km2. About 95% of the municipality's population of 4,829 (2005) lives in the town proper. 874 people speak an indigenous language. The municipality borders the municipalities of San Juan Chilateca, Ocotlán de Morelos, Santa Catarina Minas, San Miguel Tilquiapam and San Baltazar Chichicapam.

The municipality is located in a depression in the Sierra Madre del Sur mountains. The main river is the Atoyac. The climate is classed as (Köepen) (A)(C(wo), moderately hot and semi arid. Average high temperature is 18C and average low is 7C, with a range of 22C to 5C. The rainy season extends from May to October. There is little wild flora or fauna because all the available flat land is used for agriculture or livestock. In more hilly areas there are grasslands and semi arid area plants such as mesquite and guaje (Leucaena leucocephala ). Fauna include marmosa, rabbits, squirrels and some snakes and birds.

Agriculture is important here with principle crops being flowers, corn, beans and castor oil plants. There is also widespread production of cattle. This employs about 40% of the population. The soil here consists of a thin layer of decomposed volcanic rock with ten cm or less depth. Two important crops culturally are the “flor inmortal” (lit. immortal flower) and radishes. The flowers are used for decorative purposes, especially in connection with religious festivals, and many of the craftspeople who make the decorations grow the flowers themselves. Radishes are grown for the annual “Noche de Rábanos” (Radish Night) festival, which is held in Oaxaca city each year. During this event, the radishes are carved into sculptures, which are often adorned with flores inmortales and other items, and judged.

Mezcal and various crafts are made, but this only employs about 12% of the population. A large part of the population (46%) is employed in commerce.
