= Taviche =

Taviche may refer to:

- San Jerónimo Taviche
- San Pedro Taviche
