= San Bartolo Coyotepec =

San Bartolo Coyotepec Zaapeche (Zapotec)
- Town and municipality
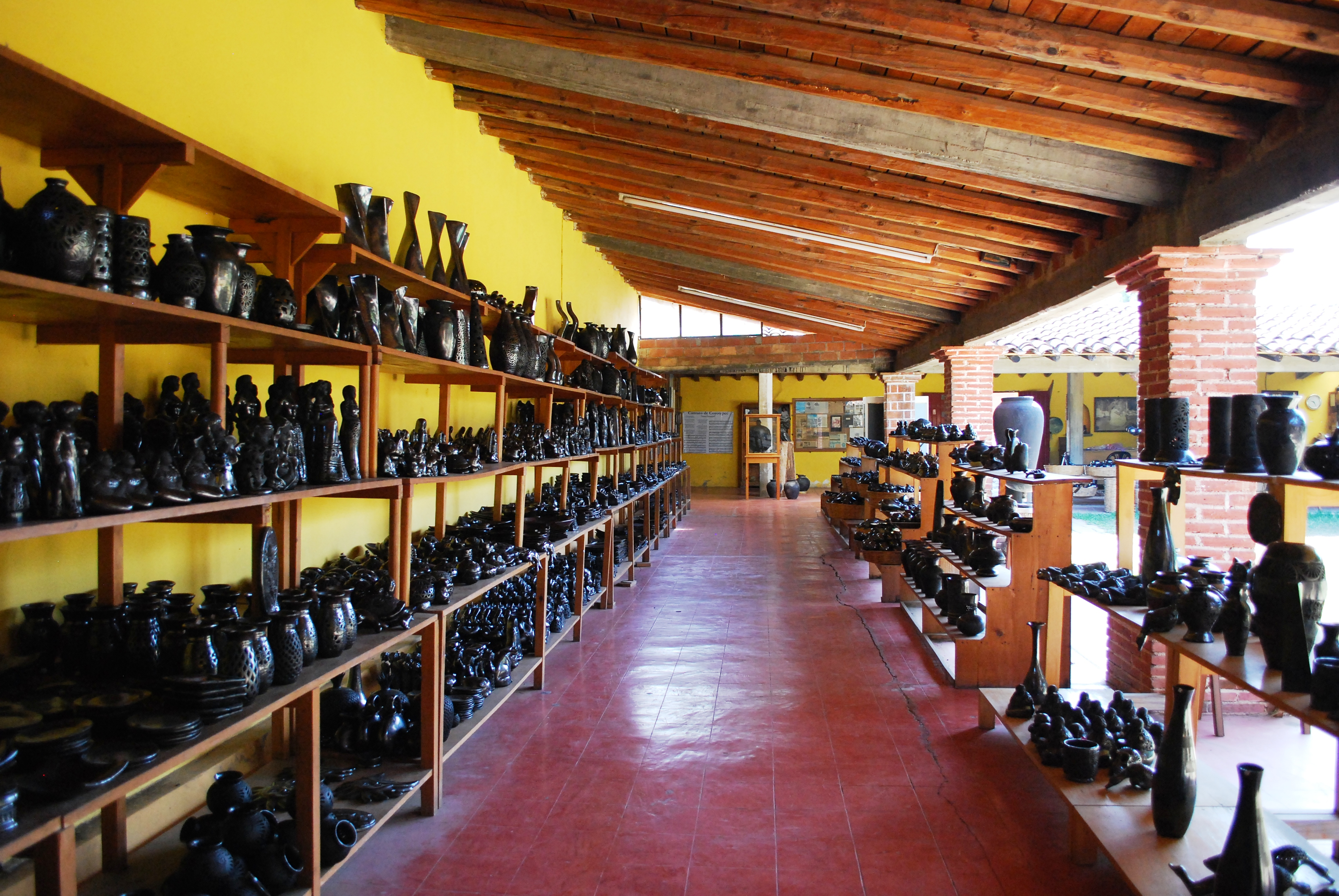
- Barro negro pottery, in the courtyard shop of the Doña Rosa Workshop, San Bartolo Coyotepec

- Location in Mexico
- Coordinates: 16°57′29″N 96°42′27″W
- Country: Mexico
- State: Oaxaca

Government
  - Municipal President: Agustin Antonio Manzano (2008–2010)

Area
  - Municipality: 45.93 km^{2} (17.73 sq mi)
- Elevation: 1,520 m (4,990 ft)

Population (2005)Municipality
  - Municipality: 8,015
  - Seat: 3,194
- Time zone: UTC-6 (Central (US Central))
- Postal code (of seat): 71256

San Bartolo Coyotepec is a town and municipality located in the center of the Mexican state of Oaxaca. It is in the Centro District of the Valles Centrales region about fifteen km south of the capital of Oaxaca.

The town is best known for its Barro negro pottery - black clay pottery. For hundreds of years pottery has been made here with a gray matte finish, but in the 1950s a technique was devised to give the pieces a shiny black finish without painting. This has made the pottery far more popular and collectable. The town is home to the Museo Estatal de Arte Popular de Oaxaca (State Museum of Popular Art of Oaxaca) which was opened here in 2004, with a large portion of its collection consisting of barro negro pottery. There is also a barro negro mural on the recently opened Baseball Academy.

== History ==
The area was the settled homeland of the ancient Mesoamerican Zapotec civilization going back at least 2500 years, with the oldest archeological finds being in the Valley of Oaxaca. Its Zapotec language name is Zaapeche, place of many jaguars (Panthera onca). In 1521, the area became an encomiendo under Bartolomé Sánchez who named the settlement, San Jacinto Leontepec. Later, this was changed to the current name. San Bartolo refers to the patron saint, Bartholomew and Coyotepec is from Nahuatl meaning "hill of coyotes".

Zaachila Zapotec is spoken in the town.

=== Pottery community of 2,000 years ===
San Bartolo is a Zapotec community, which has been making pottery for about 2,000 years. The clay of this area produces a distinctive color, which for most of San Bartolo's history was a Grey matte. This clay has been used to produce utilitarian objects such as jars, dishes and other storage containers.

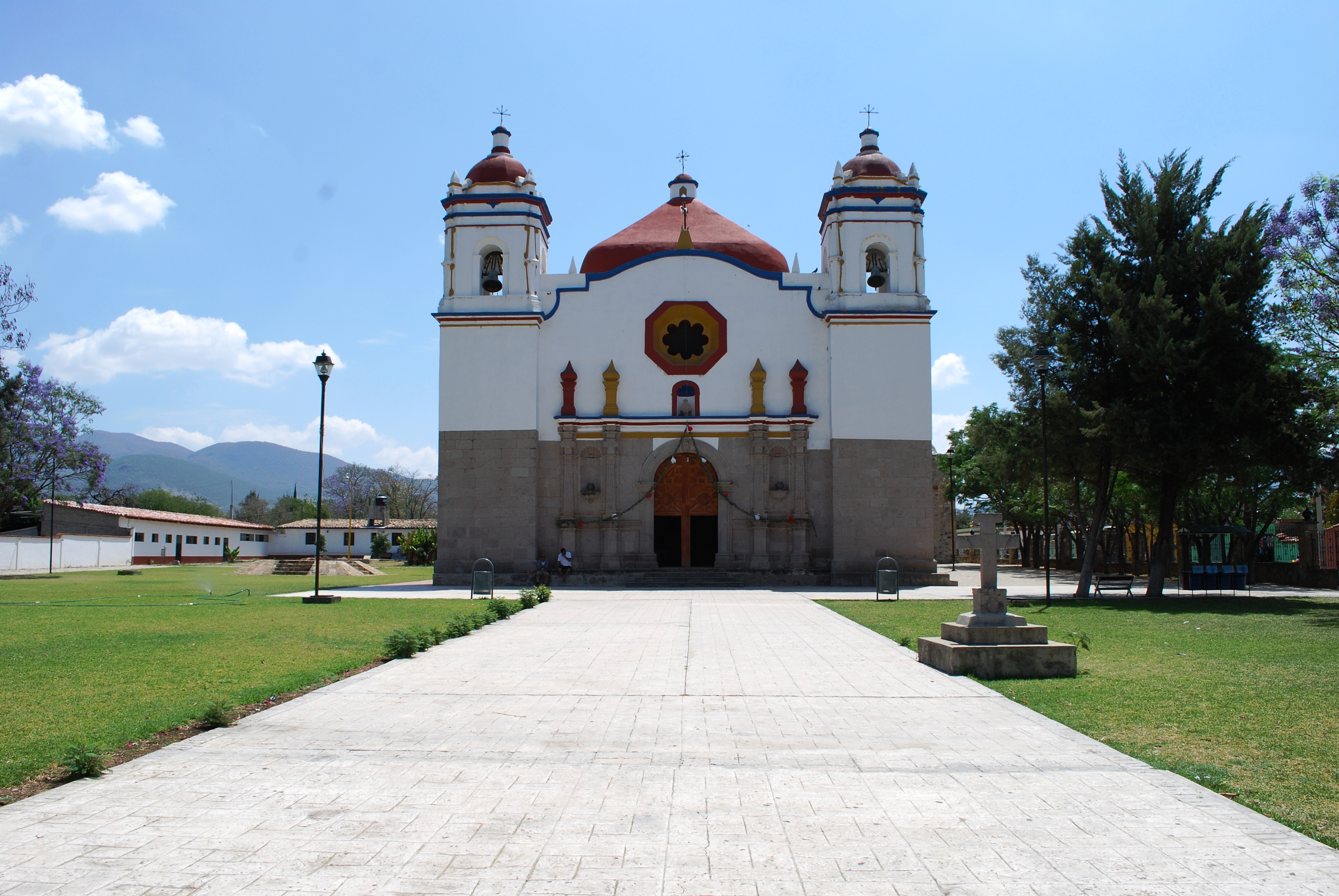
The Church of San Bartolo, with ancient Zapotec civilization Pyramids in the left background.

The techniques for making the pottery have changed little during these centuries, with plates serving as potters’ wheels and design remaining traditional. One change has been the replacement of underground pits by kilns for firing the pieces. However, the most important innovation has been a polishing method devised by ceramic artist and potter Doña Rosa in the 1950s. Doña Rosa discovered that by polishing the nearly dry clay before firing, the gray color turned to a shiny black. This has made the pottery far more popular, and many pieces are produced now for decorative purposes rather than utilitarian. Since then, the aesthetic qualities of "barro negro" (black clay) pottery has become further appreciated due to the work of artisan-sculpture Carlomagno Pedro Martinez, who has displayed his barro negro work nationally and internationally.

=== Spanish era ===
The end of the Pre-Columbian era arrived with Spanish conquest and occupation of the Zapotec peoples region in 1521. It was first renamed 'San Jacinto Leóntepec,' It then changed again to 'San Bartolomé Coyotepec,' by Bartolomé Sanchez, a soldier of Hernán Cortés awarded a local Encomienda. The first church was built in 1532. From its Spanish foundation was one of the larger settlements with three neighborhoods. This settlement was laid out by the same architect that designed the city of Oaxaca. Vicente Guerrero passed through here after he was taken prisoner, and Porfirio Díaz hid here during the French Intervention in Mexico.

== The town ==
The center of the town is similar to that of the city of Oaxaca, with a main plaza, parish church and municipal palace. The eastern side of the main plaza is dominated by a ceiba tree. In the tianguis or other markets, one can find regional dishes such as mole negro, mole coloradito, cequeza, higaditos and stews made from chicken or turkey. There are some pre-Hispanic remains of buildings which were ceremonial centers or houses for the ruling class. The rest of the town is divided into three neighborhoods called "centro" or "San Bartolo", "San Mateo" and in the north "Santa María". Very near there are two other communities called Animas Trujano and San Juan Bautistas la Raya founded around the same time as San Bartolo Coyotepec, but they are not considered part of the town proper. Next to the town is the hill called Zaapech or Jaguar Mountain which has always been considered sacred.

One of the major festivals here is Candlemas. The patron saint, Bartholomew the Apostle is feasted in August. During festivals such as these, local traditional dances such as De la Pluma and De los Jardineros Moros y Cristianos can be seen. Both date from the Spanish Conquest.

=== Mercado Artesanal (Crafts Market) ===
However two of the main attractions for the town are Mercado Artesanal (Crafts Market) filled mostly with barro negro pottery and the Museo Estatal de Arte Popular de Oaxaca (State Museum of Popular Art of Oaxaca).

=== State Museum of Popular Art of Oaxaca - MEAPO ===
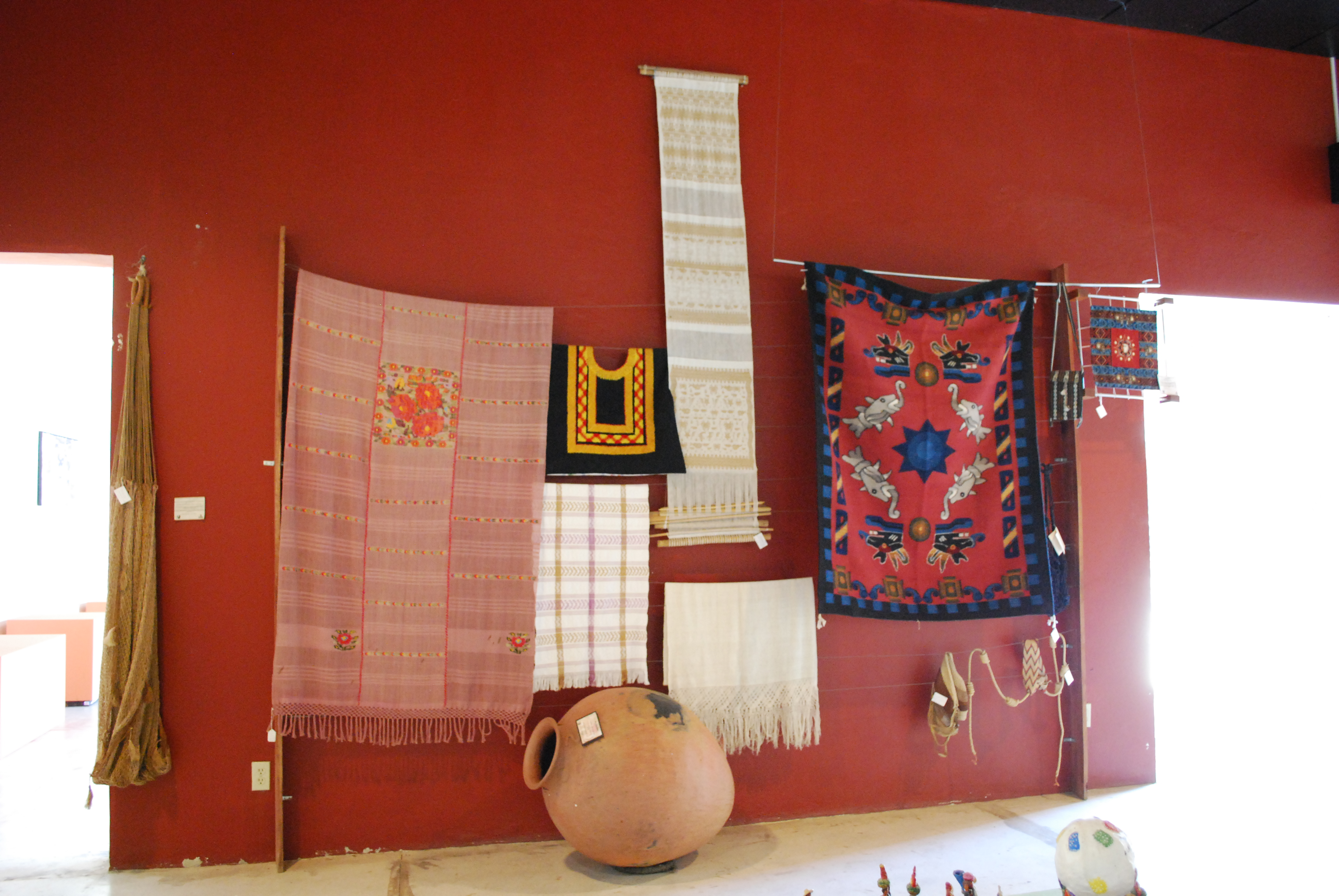
Display of local Textile arts at MEAPO - State Museum of Popular Art of Oaxaca.

The Museo Estatal de Arte Popular de Oaxaca - MEAPO, the State Museum of Popular Art of Oaxaca, was founded in 2004 to promote and preserve the traditional crafts of this state. The museum was designed by and is cared for by a commission of craftsmen from San Bartolo Coyotepec. The museum sponsors events such as the "Tianguis artisanal", a crafts flea market, along with other civic groups.

The museum has three halls.

- The first exhibits some of the finest pieces of barro negro pottery from San Bartolo Coyotepec as well as archeological finds from the area.
- The second contains 92 pieces of prizewinners from the Concurso Estatal de Cerámica "Benito Juárez" (Benito Juarez State Ceramics Competition) which is sponsored by the 'Artesanias e Industrias Populares del Estado de Oaxaca' -ARIPO, and contains various types of pottery and ceramics from Santa Maria Atzompa, San Marcos Tlapazola, Tamazulapan, Ocotlán, and San Antonino Castillo Velasco.
- The third hall contains examples of the woodworking of the San Martín Tilcajete community. Craftsmen from this community helped with the building of the museum and Masks are the featured item here. The permanent collection contains pieces from about 300 artisans in Oaxaca.

The museum's roots extend to 1905, when local resident Manuel Guzmán donated land for the establishment of a cultural center. The site was used first as a municipal library and then as a primary school. However, it was not until 1994 when a group of youths worked to build a museum that would be dedicated to barro negro pottery. That same year, the state government allocated 25,000 pesos to rehabilitate the building on the site, and local artist Carlomagno Pedro Martinez raised 80,000 pesos to install modern equipment. In 1996, the museum was founded as the community museum, with its initial collection. In that year, it sponsored, along with ARIPO - Artesanías e Industrias Populares del estado de Oaxaca, the first crafts competition. The museum struggled for a while financially until it signed a cooperation agreement with the 'Instituto Oaxaqueño de las Culturas,' the Oaxaca Institute of Cultures, which required a restructuring of the museum. In 2002, the community museum closed with the aim of building the current one.

In 2004, the current museum opened with the aim of presenting the crafts history of the entire state of Oaxaca, Mexico. The museum has held temporary exhibits such as "Mujeres tejiendo historias" (Women knitting stories), "Grandes Maestros del Arte Popular de Oaxaca" (Grand Masters of Popular Art in Oaxaca) and "Historia y evolución del barro negro" (History and evolution of barro negro pottery). The new museum opened with new furniture and designed to international standards. The idea is to create a collection of popular art that represents the eight regions of the state of Oaxaca.

The mission is to promote Oaxacan handcrafts and popular art to the state's, Mexican, and international communities, as well as foster exchanges among artisans and promote tourism based on crafts. This includes the weaving and textile arts in Oaxacan traditions. The museum was built here to decentrale state cultural institutions. The museum offers guided tours in Spanish and English, workshops for adults and children, and spaces to rent for events.

== Barro negro pottery ==
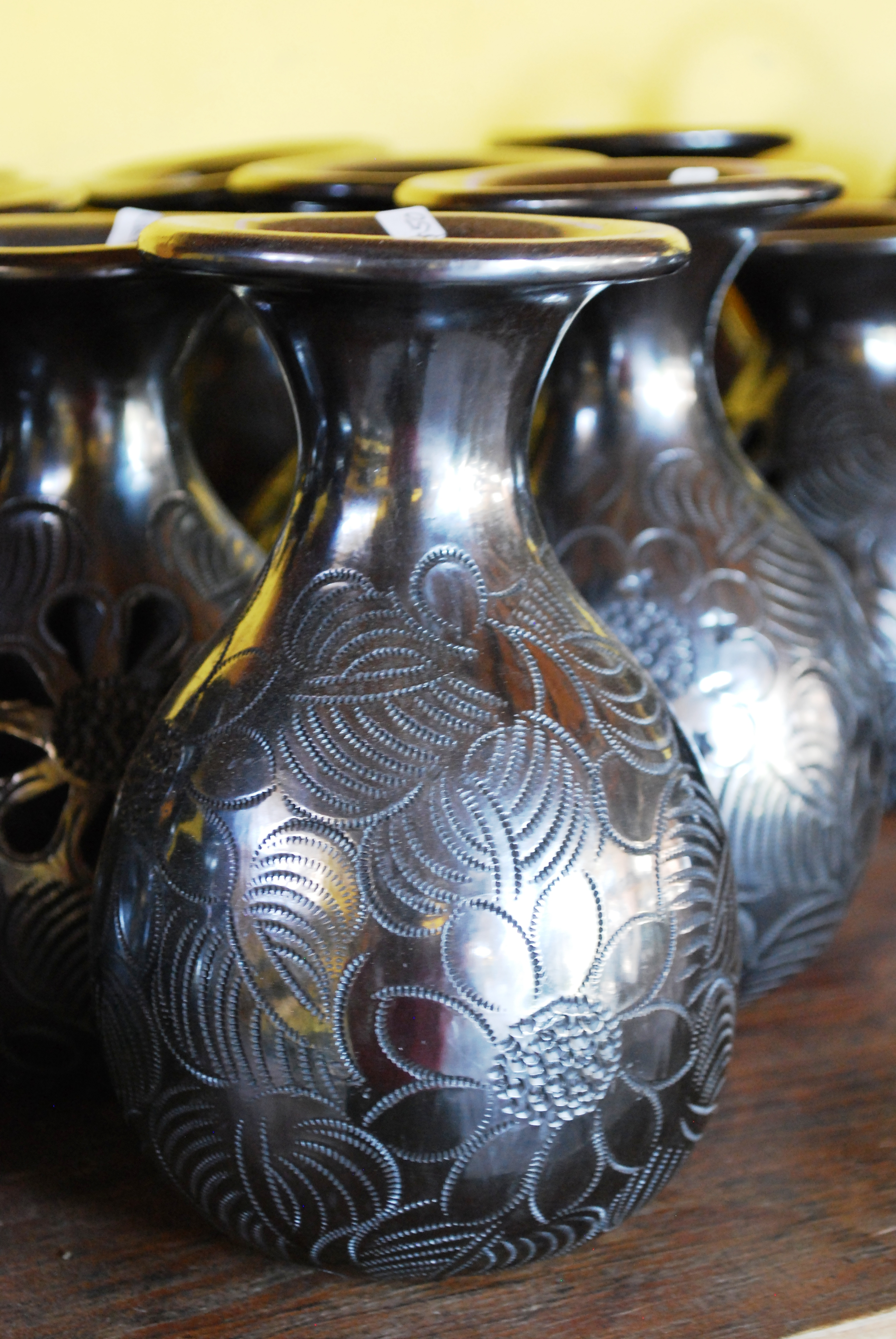
Barro negro pottery in the metallic finish at the Doña Rosa Workshop

=== Doña Rosa ===
For almost all of the town's history, the color of the local pottery was a dull dark gray, until Doña Rosa Real discovered a way to create a shiny black finish commonly known as barro negro pottery. The innovation made the pottery more popular and famous, with Nelson Rockefeller having a collection of her pieces. Doña Rosa died in 1980, but the tradition of making the barro negro pottery is being carried on by Doña Rosa's daughter and grandchildren who stage demonstrations for tourists. The workshop is still in the family home, where shelves and shelves of shiny black pieces for sale line the inner courtyard. Despite being the origin of black polished clay, the pieces at the Doña Rosa Workshop are less expensive than in other parts of Mexico.

=== The Cantaro ===
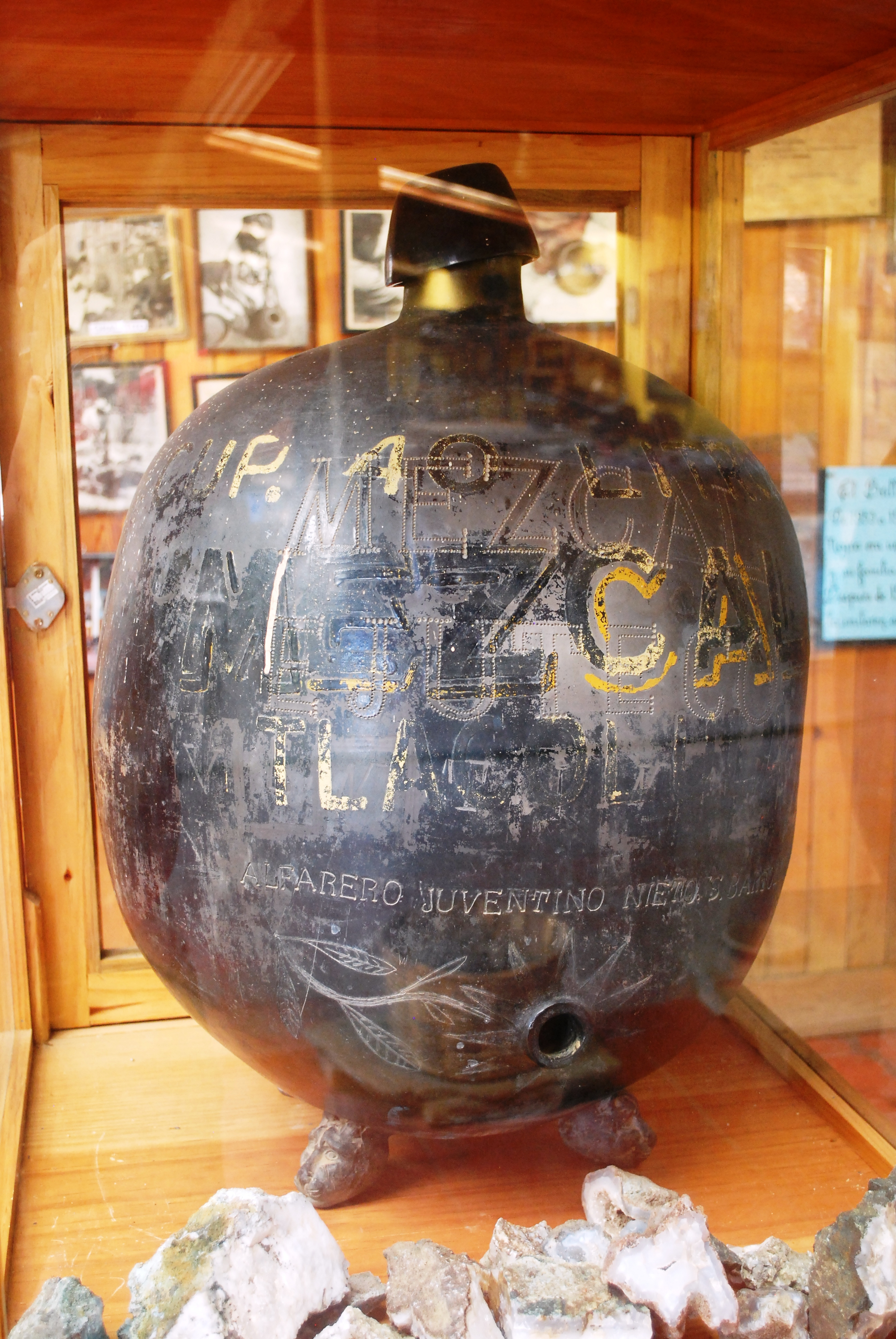
A cantaro jar for serving mezcal.

Two pottery pieces which are indicative of San Bartolo are the traditional Cantaro, a large jar which can be used for liquid storage or as a musical instrument and the "chango mezcalero" or mezcal monkey. This is a clay container in the shape of a monkey to hold mezcal, Oaxaca main distilled spirit, which has become a collectable folk art item. The container can be painted in bright colors or left in its gray color with detailed etching. The small opening at the top is plugged by a stopper of cork or corncob. These bottles are sized to hold about 700 to 1000 milliliters of liquid and were originally meant to serve as decorative containers in bars.

Two families claim to have originated this clay bottle. The first is that of Doña Rosa. The family believes that Doña Rosa's husband, Juventino Nieto, invented the design at the request of cantina operators from the city of Oaxaca. Other animal forms were also designed as created as well, but the monkey one gained notoriety. The other family to lay claim to the mezcal monkey is that of Marcelo Simón Galan, now deceased. This family claims that he used to travel with his grey pottery pieces, which included water bottles and jars. Like the Doña Rosa family, this family claims the design was created upon request, with Marcelo doing the potting and others the painting. One of Marcelo's mezcal monkeys is on display at the state crafts museum.

=== Carlomagno Pedro Martinez ===
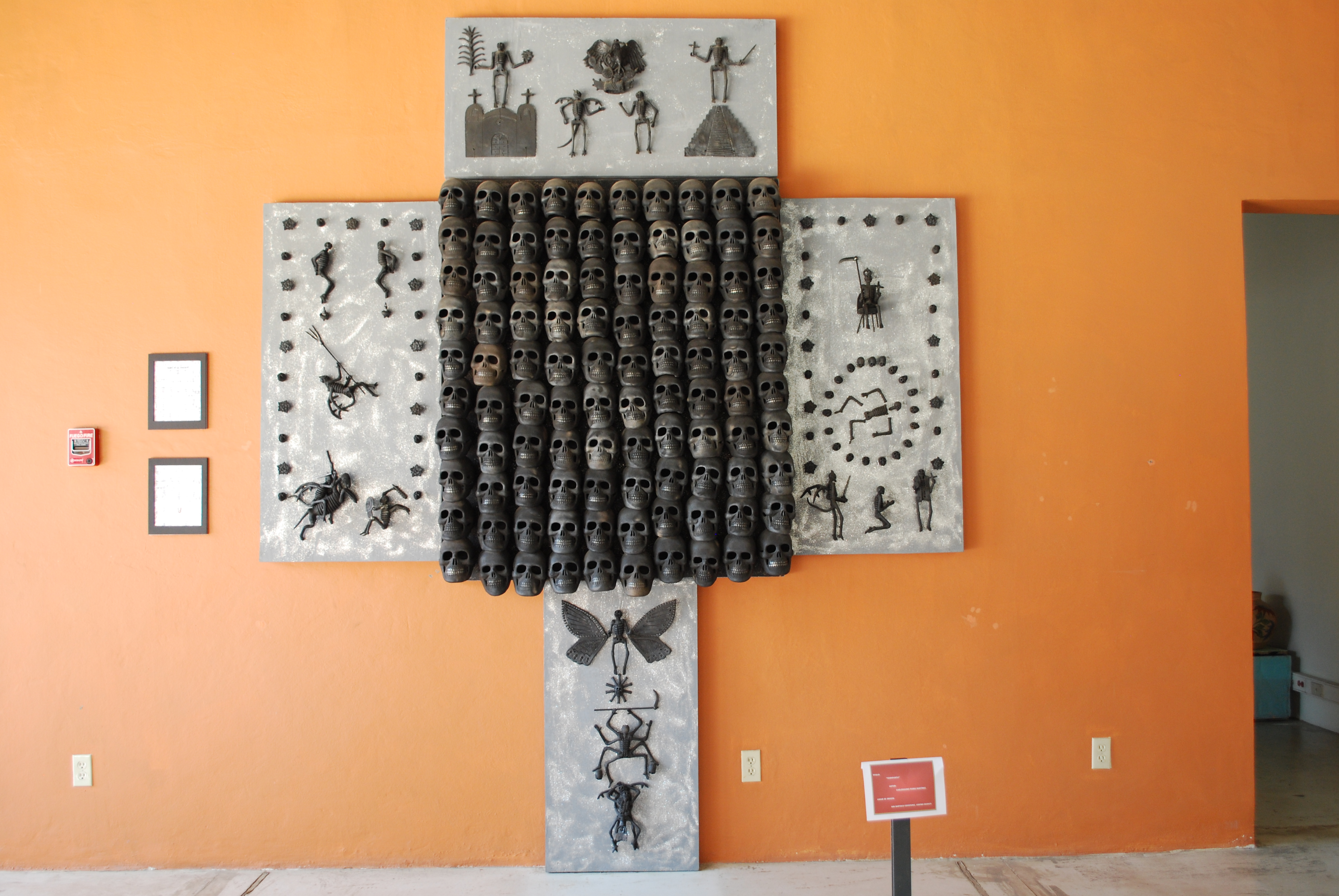
"Mural de la Conquista" by artist Carlomagno Pedro Martínez at the State Museum of Popular Art of Oaxaca-MEAPO

Another promoter of barro negro pottery from San Bartolo Coyotepec is Carlomagno Pedro Martinez. He was born here into a pottery-making family. He was named after Charlemagne by his grandmother, who was an admirer of the king. From a young age showed talent in fashioning figures in clay. When he was grown, he attended the Fine Arts Workshop of Rufino Tamayo in Oaxaca city. He has become the first potter-artist-sculptor in the medium, winning his first recognition in 1985 for his work Tlaquepaque, Jalisco. His fame increased with his development of human skulls made of barro negro in the years that followed. In Mexico, he has exhibited his work in dozens of expositions and has won three national level awards. His work has also been featured in five published books. Martinez's work has been exhibited in countries such as the United States, Colombia, Argentina, Lebanon, Germany, Spain, and Japan, with one of the latest exhibits in New York City in 2008. In that same year, he created a mural in barro negro at the Baseball Academy in San Bartolo Coyotepec sponsored by the Alfredo Harp Helú Foundation. Each piece Carlomagno makes is unique in some way, but certain themes such as oral histories, indigenous legends, certain Christian themes and death, called "our grandmother."

== The municipality ==
As municipal seat, the town of San Bartolo Coyotepec is the governing authority for the seven other communities: Reyes Mantecón, Cuarta Sección, La Guelavaca (El Tule), El Guapo (San Francisco), La Magdalena, La Soledad, Paraje la Colorada and Paraje la Era. Together these communities cover an area of 45.93 km^{2} and have a total population of just over 8,000 people.(inegi) The municipality borders the municipalities of Santa María Coyotepec, Santa Catarina Quiane, San Martín Tilcajete, Santo Tomás Jalieza, San Juan Teitipac and Villa de Zaachila.

The most important elevations are Piedra Redonda, Chivaguia Grande, Chivaguia Chica, Guinise Grande, Loma del Cuche, La Peñas and Guibetes. The Atoyac and Valiente Rivers pass through here. The municipality has a temperate climate with winds mostly from the north.

Agriculture employ about 19% of the population growing vegetables such as corn, beans and squash blossom, as well as decorative flowers such as daisies, Mexican marigolds and poinsettias. Orchards here produce oranges, mangos, mamey sapotes, black sapotes, guavas and other tropical fruit. Livestock includes domestic fowl, pigs, cattle and sheep. About 33% are involved in mining and industry, with most of this population dedicated to the making of barro negro pottery. The rest of the population, about 45% is employed in commerce.

=== Padre, family, and community ===
In 1997, Father Manuel Marinero announced that he was in love with a member of the parish church. The Catholic Church responded by immediately putting an end to Marinero's 24-year career as a priest. However, since then the local community has continued to support him as their spiritual leader. At least as of 2002, the town of San Bartolo Coyotepec has officially been without a priest as Marinero is not recognized. However, the people here still called him "Padre" (Father) and he continues to live in the house that has been traditionally reserved for parish priests with his wife and two children. The Church has asked him to move but the house belongs to the town and the residents want him to stay. It is not unknown for Mexican priests to have significant others, but it is kept hidden and numbers are not known. Marinero's case is unusual because it is public. Beginning in 2004, Marinero began to publicly support gay marriage as well

=== Academy of Baseball ===
In 2009 the Academy of Baseball was founded in San Bartolo Coyotepec by Alfredo Harp Helú. The academy has six instructors and can accommodate sixty students of between fourteen and seventeen years of age. The goal is to prepare young people who hope to have a career in the sport, while supporting the completion of their education. It is the first of its kind in Mexico and the founder hopes that there will be more. The facilities cover more than ten hectares and include a library, computer center, three baseball fields, and living quarters for students. Murals were commissioned for the project including "El camino del Sol for el cielo" by José Luis Garcia and a barro negro mural by Carlomagno Pedro called "Juego en el inframundo".

== See also ==
- Category: Mexican potters
  - Category: Pre-Columbian pottery
  - Ceramic art
- Valley of Oaxaca
  - Rodolfo Morales
  - Rufino Tamayo
