= Asunción Ocotlán =

- Municipality and town
- Location in Mexico
- Coordinates: 16°45′32″N 96°43′8″W
- Country: Mexico
- State: Oaxaca

Area
  - Total: 12.76 km^{2} (4.93 sq mi)

Population (2005)
  - Total: 3,257
- Time zone: UTC-6 (Central Standard Time)

Asunción Ocotlán is a town and municipality in Oaxaca in south-western Mexico.

== Etymology ==
Its name "Asunción" alludes the assumption of Mary and Ocotlán means between ocotes -Oco (ocote) and tlan (between) in Nahuatl.

== Geography ==
The municipality covers an area of 12.76 km^{2}. It is part of the Ocotlán District in the south of the Valles Centrales Region. It borders at north and west with Ocotlán de Morelos, south with San Pedro Apóstol and east with San Pedro Mártir. Almost all the lands are plains and its water sources come from the Mijangos and Atoyac rivers. Its economy is based in agriculture in spite of its semi-desert climate.

== Demography ==
As of 2005, the municipality had a total population of 3,257. The largest part of population is Catholic.

== Culture ==
Asunción Ocotlán's culture is shaped by celebrations, traditions and art. The main celebration is The Assumption of Virgin Mary. As in many small towns or villages, a wedding party tradition is that the couple and their families dance with the presents they have received. Music and crafts are integral parts of the city. Traditional music, called Banda music, is still the most played genre in the area. People make crafts such as baskets with a reed called Phragmites. Traditional foods include Mole (sauce) over a turkey called the Ocellated Turkey and white rice, barbacoa, tlayudas, memelas, and empanadas. Beverages include hot chocolate, atole with chocolate, tepache, and mezcal.

== Infrastructure ==
Its government takes care of the hospitals, schools, paved roads and others, though not all of the population take advantage of these amenities. There is one preschool, two elementary schools, one middle school, and one hospital. There are 781 houses, most of them are privately owned. 96 percent of people take advantage of street lighting, 70 percent of the cities water, and 10 percent take advantage of the sewer and garbage pickup service. The paved roads connect the town with San Dionisio Ocotlan and San Pedro Apóstol. The media channels are local although people can pay to get SKY (a Mexican cable TV company).
