= San José del Progreso =

- Municipality and town
- Location in Mexico
- Coordinates: 16°41′N 96°41′W
- Country: Mexico
- State: Oaxaca

Area
  - Total: 66.34 km^{2} (25.61 sq mi)

Population (2005)
  - Total: 6,164
- Time zone: UTC-6 (Central Standard Time)

San José del Progreso is a town and municipality in Oaxaca in south-western Mexico. The municipality covers an area of 66.34 km^{2}. It is part of the Ocotlán District in the south of the Valles Centrales Region.

As of 2005, the municipality had a total population of 6,164.

== Economy ==
A significant silver mine owned by Fortuna Silver Mines, a Canadian company, is located in the municipality.
