= San Pedro Mártir, Oaxaca =

San Pedro Mártir
- Municipality and town
- Location in Mexico
- Coordinates: 16°43′N 96°42′W
- Country: Mexico
- State: Oaxaca
- District: Ocotlán District

Population (2020)
  - Total: 1,899
- Time zone: UTC-6 (Central Standard Time)

San Pedro Mártir is a town and municipality in Oaxaca in south-western Mexico. The municipality covers an area of km^{2}. It is part of the Ocotlán District in the south of the Valles Centrales Region.

As of 2005, the municipality had a total population of .
