= Yaxe Magdalena =

Yaxe (San Nicolás Yaxe)
- Municipality and town
- Location in Mexico
- Coordinates: 16°43′N 96°28′W
- Country: Mexico
- State: Oaxaca

Area
  - Total: 65.07 km^{2} (25.12 sq mi)
- Elevation: 1,500 m (4,900 ft)

Population (2005)
  - Total: 2,442
- Time zone: UTC-6 (Central Standard Time)

Yaxe (San Nicolás Yaxe) is a town and municipality in Oaxaca in south-western Mexico. It is part of the Ocotlán District in the south of the Valles Centrales Region. The name Yaxe means "Green corn" in the Zapotec language.

== Geography ==
The municipality covers an area of 65.07 km^{2} at an altitude of 1,500 meters above sea level. The climate is temperate or cool. The soil is thin, of volcanic origin, varied but dominated by semi-desert landscapes.

=== Flora and fauna ===
In the hills there are some rabbits, opossums and skunks, and occasional coyotes. There are several species of wild birds including pigeons, hawks, mockingbirds and hummingbird. It is common to find rattlesnakes, coral snakes and some iguanas in the lower parts.

== Demography ==
As of 2005, the municipality had 502 households with a total population of 2,442 of whom seven spoke an indigenous language. The population is declining due to migration to other parts of the country and the United States of America. Houses typically have dirt or cement floors, adobe or red brick walls and sheet metal, tile or concrete slab roofs.

== Economy ==
Agriculture is one of the most important activities in the municipality, growing corn, beans and fruits. The dominant economic activity is the mining industry, exploiting deposits of silver and lead.
