= Santiago Apóstol =

- Municipality and town
- Interactive map of Santiago Apóstol
- Coordinates: 16°49′N 96°43′W
- Country: Mexico
- State: Oaxaca
- Time zone: UTC-6 (Central Standard Time)

Santiago Apóstol is a town and municipality in Oaxaca, Mexico. Its population was 4,200 in 2010. A large portion of their native population speak Zapotec, one of the indigenous Mesoamerican languages. The town is located about 36 km (22 mi) from Oaxaca City, the state capital.

It is part of the Ocotlán District south of the Valles Centrales Region.
