= Santa Lucía Ocotlán =

- Municipality and town
- Location in Mexico
- Coordinates: 16°44′N 96°41′W
- Country: Mexico
- State: Oaxaca
- Time zone: UTC-6 (Central Standard Time)

Santa Lucía Ocotlán is a town and municipality in Oaxaca in south-western Mexico. The municipality covers an area of km^{2}. It is part of the Ocotlán District in the south of the Valles Centrales Region

As of 2005, the municipality had a total population of .
