= San Baltazar Chichicapam =

- Municipality and town
- Location in Mexico
- Coordinates: 16°46′N 96°29′W
- Country: Mexico
- State: Oaxaca

Area
  - Total: 100.79 km^{2} (38.92 sq mi)

Population (2005)
  - Total: 2,716
- Time zone: UTC-6 (Central Standard Time)
- Postal code: 71537
- Area code: 951

San Baltazar Chichicapam is a town and municipality in Oaxaca in south-western Mexico. The municipality covers an area of 100.79 km^{2}. It is part of the Ocotlán District in the south of the Valles Centrales Region.

As of 2005, the municipality had a total population of 2,716.

Municipal President Florencio San Germán died in 2020 during the COVID-19 pandemic in Mexico.

== History ==
Chichicapan was a prehispanic Zapotec settlement. Many gods were worshipped here, of which the most important was Pichanagobeche, who cured illness. There was also Pichanto, who interceded on behalf of humans to Pichanagobeche. The people offered their blood as well as quails, dogs, and other animals to these gods. Whenever an animal was hunted, its heart had to be offered to the gods before the meat could be eaten. War captives had their hearts torn out and their bodies were eaten.
