= Santa Ana Zegache =

- Municipality and town
- Location in Mexico
- Coordinates: 16°50′09.33″N 96°43′46.24″W
- Country: Mexico
- State: Oaxaca
- Time zone: UTC-6 (Central Standard Time)

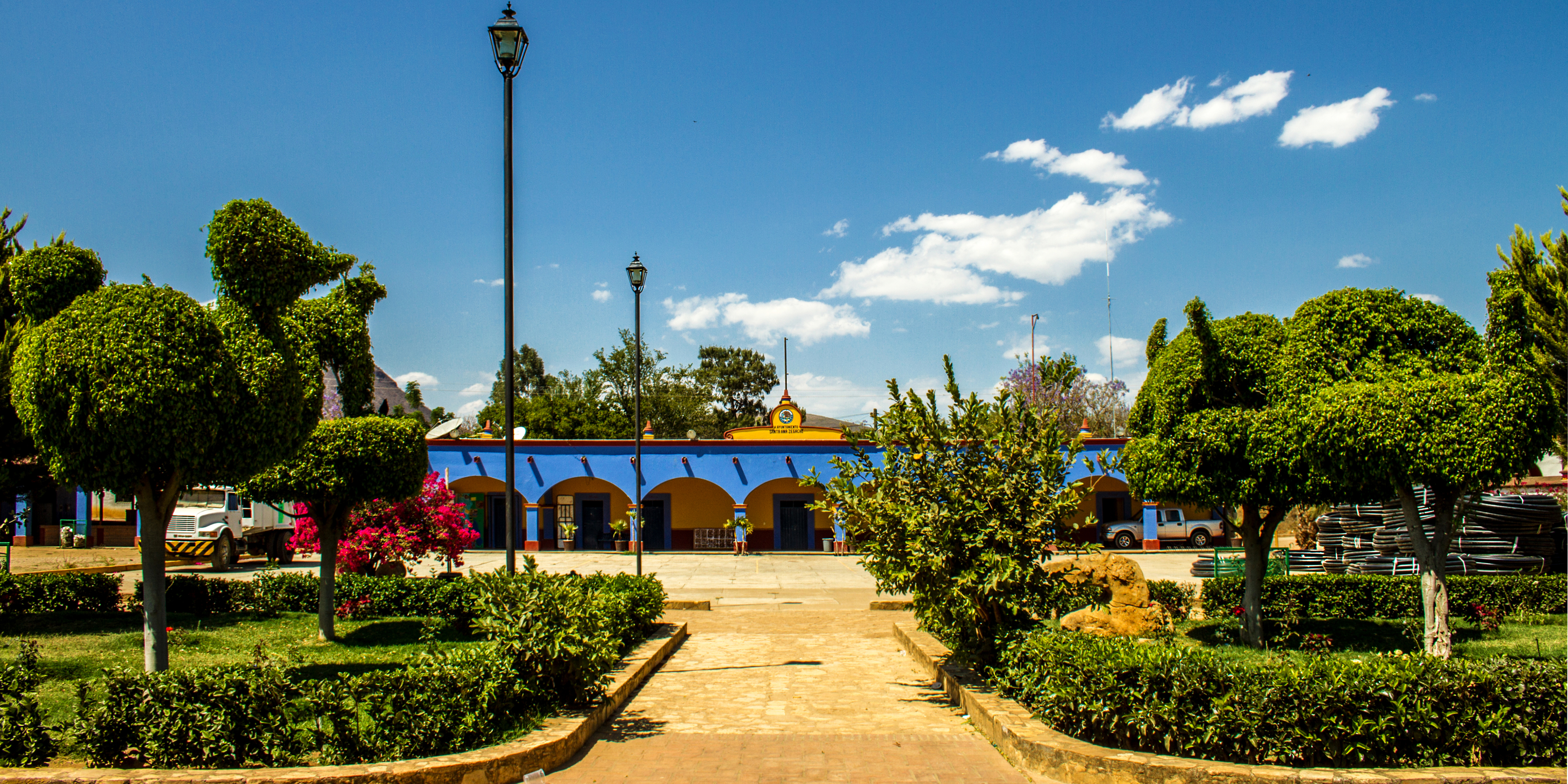
Municipal Presidency of Santa Ana Zegache, Oaxaca, Mexico.

Santa Ana Zegache is a town and municipality in Oaxaca in south-western Mexico. The municipality covers an area of 26.79 km^{2}. It is part of the Ocotlán District in the south of the Valles Centrales Region.

As of 2005, the municipality had a total population of 3,196.

A project dedicated to restoring artifacts from the church, Zegache Talleres Comunitarios, was founded by painter Rodolfo Morales, and continues to employ and train many local people.

Yatzeche Zapotec was formerly spoken in the town.
