= Ocotlán District =

- District
- Oaxaca regions and districts: Valles Centrales in center
- Coordinates: 16°47′N 96°40′W
- Country: Mexico
- State: Oaxaca

Population (2020)
  - Total: 80,510

Ocotlán District is located in the south of the Valles Centrales Region of the State of Oaxaca, Mexico.

== Municipalities ==
Ocotlán municipalities

The district includes the following municipalities:

Municipality code	Name	Population		Land Area			Population density	
Municipality code	Name	2020	Rank	km^{2}	sq mi	Rank	2020	Rank
007	Asunción Ocotlán	2,395	11	4.519	1.745	20	530/km^{2} (1,373/sq mi)	2
049	Magdalena Ocotlán	1,184	20	10.33	3.99	16	115/km^{2} (297/sq mi)	10
068	Ocotlán de Morelos	23,715	1	119.5	46.1	2	198/km^{2} (514/sq mi)	7
103	San Antonino Castillo Velasco	6,064	3	11.34	4.38	15	535/km^{2} (1,385/sq mi)	1
112	San Baltazar Chichicapam	2,576	10	92.18	35.59	5	28/km^{2} (72/sq mi)	17
132	San Dionisio Ocotlán	1,380	19	310.4	119.8	1	4/km^{2} (12/sq mi)	4
162	San Jerónimo Taviche	2,046	13	72.72	28.08	6	28/km^{2} (73/sq mi)	18
072	San José del Progreso	8,059	2	108.4	41.9	3	74/km^{2} (193/sq mi)	12
192	San Juan Chilateca	1,522	17	5.205	2.010	19	292/km^{2} (757/sq mi)	4
243	San Martín Tilcajete	1,975	14	24.23	9.36	12	82/km^{2} (211/sq mi)	11
284	San Miguel Tilquiapam	3,141	8	71.06	27.44	7	44/km^{2} (114/sq mi)	16
301	San Pedro Apóstol	1,594	16	8.877	3.427	17	180/km^{2} (465/sq mi)	8
315	San Pedro Mártir	1,899	15	7.578	2.926	18	251/km^{2} (649/sq mi)	6
328	San Pedro Taviche	1,441	18	98.39	37.99	4	15/km^{2} (38/sq mi)	19
360	Santa Ana Zegache	3,981	6	26.80	10.35	11	149/km^{2} (385/sq mi)	9
368	Santa Catarina Minas	2,067	12	36.33	14.03	10	57/km^{2} (147/sq mi)	13
393	Santa Lucía Ocotlán	4,173	5	11.67	4.51	14	358/km^{2} (926/sq mi)	3
452	Santiago Apóstol	4,421	4	17.61	6.80	13	251/km^{2} (650/sq mi)	5
530	Santo Tomás Jalieza	3,923	7	70.10	27.07	8	56/km^{2} (145/sq mi)	14
561	Yaxe Magdalena	2,954	9	59.99	23.16	9	49/km^{2} (128/sq mi)	15
	Distrito Ocotlán	80,510	—	1,167	450.58	—	69/km^{2} (179/sq mi)	—
Source: INEGI

=== Largest cities ===
Largest cities or towns in Ocotlán Distric Source:
Rank		Municipality	Pop.
1	Ocotlán de Morelos	Ocotlán de Morelos	16,645
2	San Antonino Castillo Velasco	San Antonino Castillo Velasco	5,804
3	Santa Lucía Ocotlán	Santa Lucía Ocotlán	4,094
4	Santiago Apóstol	Santiago Apóstol	3,821
5	San José del Progreso	San José del Progreso	3,583
6	San Miguel Tilquiapam	San Miguel Tilquiapam	3,108
7	Yaxe Magdalena	Yaxe Magdalena	2,954
8	Santa Ana Zegache	Santa Ana Zegache	2,879
9	San Baltazar Chichicapam	San Baltazar Chichicapam	2,552
10	Asunción Ocotlán	Asunción Ocotlán	2,350
