= Magdalena Ocotlán =

- Municipality and town
- Location in Mexico
- Coordinates: 16°42′N 96°43′W
- Country: Mexico
- State: Oaxaca

Area
  - Total: 24.24 km^{2} (9.36 sq mi)

Population (2005)
  - Total: 1,060
- Time zone: UTC-6 (Central Standard Time)

Magdalena Ocotlán is a town and municipality in Oaxaca in south-western Mexico. The municipality covers an area of 24.24 km^{2}. It is part of the Ocotlán District in the south of the Valles Centrales Region.

As of 2005, the municipality had a total population of 1,060.
