= San Miguel Tilquiapam =

- Municipality and town
- Location in Mexico
- Coordinates: 16°47′N 96°35′W
- Country: Mexico
- State: Oaxaca

Area
  - Total: 39.55 km^{2} (15.27 sq mi)

Population (2005)
  - Total: 3,442
- Time zone: UTC-6 (Central Standard Time)

San Miguel Tilquiapam is a town and municipality in Oaxaca in south-western Mexico. The municipality covers an area of 39.55 km^{2}. It is part of the Ocotlán District in the south of the Valles Centrales Region.

As of 2005, the municipality had a total population of 3,442.
