= Rodolfo Morales =

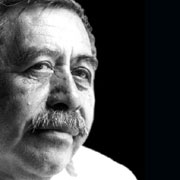
- Born: May 8, 1925
- Died: January 30, 2001 (aged 75)

Rodolfo Morales painted pillars - characteristically richly coloured and depicting brides

Rodolfo Morales (May 8, 1925 – January 30, 2001) was a Mexican painter, who incorporated elements of magic realism into his work.

Morales is best known for his brightly colored surrealistic dream-like canvases and collages often featuring Mexican women in village settings. He was notable for his restoration of historic buildings in Ocotlán de Morelos and, together with Rufino Tamayo and Francisco Toledo, helped make Oaxaca in Southern Mexico a centre for contemporary art and tourism. Up until his death in 2001, both he and Toledo had been regarded as Mexico's greatest living artists for over a decade.

== Early years ==
A Zapotec Native American, born to working-class parents in the small town of Ocotlán de Morelos, Morales was an often solitary child who found comfort in drawing. From 1948 to 1953 he studied art at the Academy of San Carlos in Mexico City. He graduated as a drawing teacher and began a 32-year career as an art teacher at Escuela Nacional Preparatoria, a position he held from 1953 until 1985.

In 1965 while organizing a Christmas party at the home of a sculptor friend, Geles Cabrera, he used collages as decorations. She liked his works and suggested a trade: a piece of sculpture for a painting. This recognition stimulated Morales to focus all his efforts on painting and, to make extra money, he organized exhibitions of his work in small galleries around the capital.

In 1975 with Morales approaching 50, he was persuaded by Cabrera to hold his first mainstream solo exhibition at the Casa de las Campanas Art Gallery in Cuernavaca. Here his paintings came to the attention of famous Mexican painter Rufino Tamayo. Tamayo helped Morales make contacts with art critics and galleries around the world, leading to a number of joint and solo exhibitions.

== Later years ==
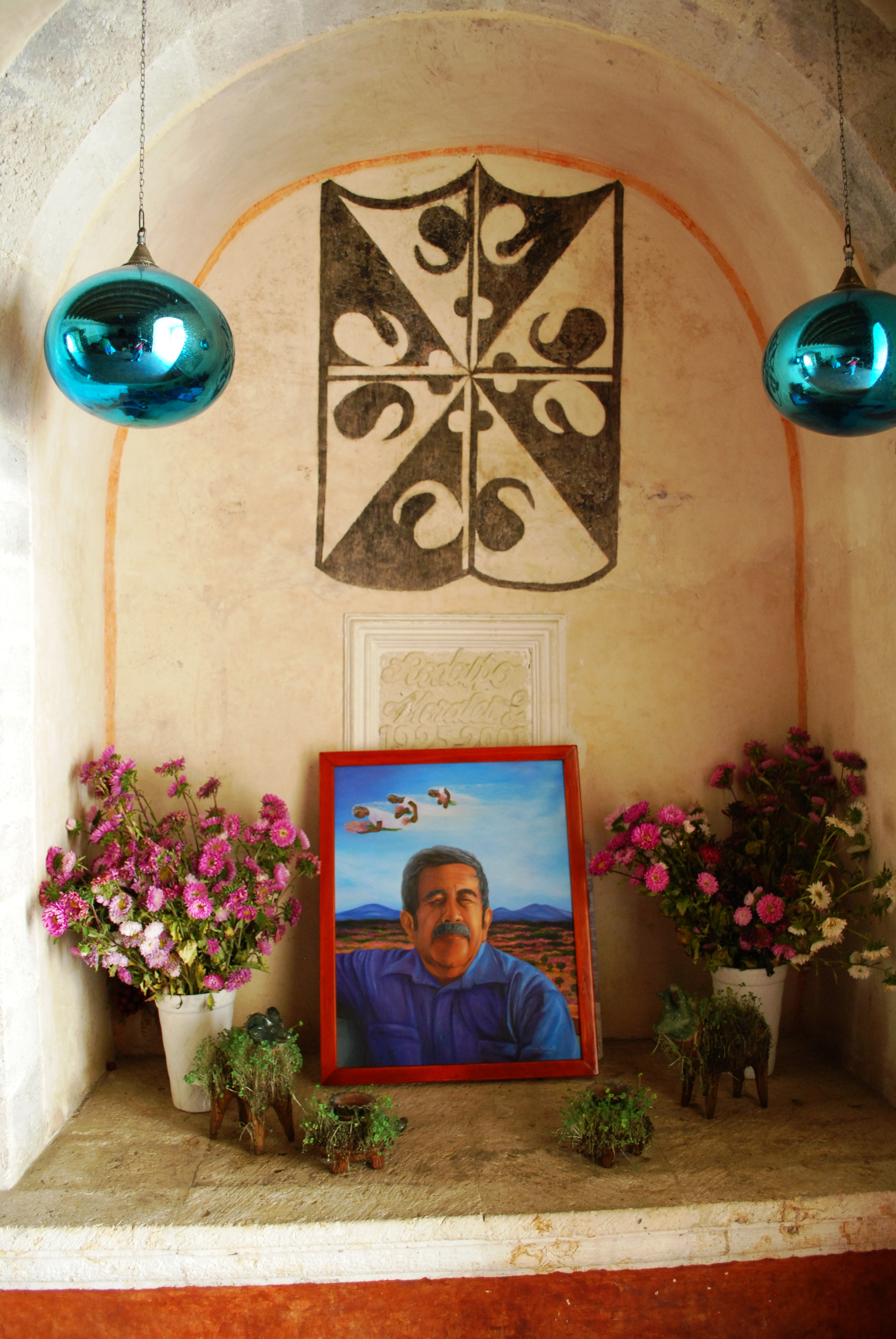
Shrine to Morales in the monastery/museum of Ocotlán de Morelos, Oaxaca

By 1985, Morales had earned enough money to stop teaching and to return to Oaxaca where he was able to dedicate himself to both his art and to restoration. Using income from his art he founded the Rodolfo Morales Cultural Foundation devoted to restoration of buildings in his hometown of Ocotlán. In all, he funded the restoration of fifteen churches including the 16th century Convent of Santo Domingo and a 17th-century church in the town of Santa Ana Zegache, as well creating cultural spaces throughout Oaxaca's central valleys. His most important restoration project was the former convent of Ocotlan which was converted into a municipal complex.

Morales ensured that much of the restoration work done was by local women who, by developing skills, were able to later find employment elsewhere. His other notable Foundation work included setting up a computer room for local youths to learn information technology skills, providing materials to aspiring artists, producing of prints to help Frente Común Contra SIDA educate against the spread of AIDS and planting new copal trees not only to enhance the landscape but also to provide wood for the creation of hand-painted animals.

Whilst continuing with his art, he would begin each day by making a small collage which he would sell to raise money for his Foundation.

He died on January 30, 2001, at the age of 75 in Oaxaca from pancreatic cancer. His remains were placed in his restored Convent of Santo Domingo, in Ocotlán, Oaxaca.

== Artistic style and technique ==
Morales' work has been described as dream-like, fertile and heavily based in folklore. It often depicts indigenous people, especially women set amongst rural buildings, churches, town squares and arcaded shops. His style is influenced by María Izquierdo (1902–1955) and French painter Marc Chagall (1887–1985).

Women and memories appear to be at the heart of his work. Morales once explained, "Mexico would be lost without the steadfast work of women. They bear the burden of day-to-day living and find solutions to those problems to which men simply resign themselves." In a 1995 interview Morales explained, "I came here to live in my memories. . . Nostalgia and melancholy are very important to me." Despite this, Morales avoided discussing the "meaning" of his work, often producing works without title.

Characteristics of his work include rich use of colour, exaggerated hands and feet, over-sized faces, women (often brides), puppies, flowers, angels, bicycles, musical instruments and the dreamy floating of figures.

Whilst the bulk of his work was oil on canvas he also produced a number of murals, highly decorated pieces of wooden furniture and characteristic cardboard pillars which, when arranged together, create a changing kaleidoscope of image and colour as the viewer walks around them. Added to this were his many collages, some sold as fund raisers but others, often in a set and in greater detail, arranged to tell a story. In 1998 the Children's Book Press published Angel's Kite illustrated by Morales in the form of collage.

== Exhibitions and murals ==
=== Notable Individual Exhibits ===
- 1973 Provincial Palace of Málaga, Málaga, Spain
- 1975 Casa de las Campanas, Cuernavaca, Morelos
- 1976 Galeria del Circulo, Mexico City
- 1978 Galeria Miro, Monterrey, Mexico
- 1978 Mexican Museum, San Francisco, California
- 1978 Estella Shapiro Gallery, Mexico City
- 1979 Club de Industriales, Monterrey, Mexico
- 1980 Instituto Nacional de Bellas Artes, Mexico City
- 1981 Downtown Gallery, Fort Worth, Texas
- 1981 National Polytechnic Institute, Mexico City
- 1982 Estella Shapiro Gallery, Mexico City
- 1983 Museo de Arte Contemporáneo de Monterrey, Monterrey
- 1986 Galeria Los Principes, Oaxaca, Mexico
- 1986 Taller Artes Plasticas Rufino Tamayo, Oaxaca, Mexico
- 1986 Magic and Mystery, Galeria Centro Cultural, Mexico City
- 1988 Vorpal Gallery, SoHo, New York
- 1989 Vorpal Gallery, SoHo, New York
- 1990 Vorpal Gallery, San Francisco
- 1990 Estella Shapiro Gallery, Mexico City
- 1993 Ramis Barquet, Monterrey, Nuevo Leon, Mexico
- 1995 Dreams of a Village, Riva Yares Gallery, Santa Fe, New Mexico
- 1996 Dreams of a Village, Riva Yares Gallery, Scottsdale, Arizona
- 1996 Opening Exhibition, Mexican Museum, San Francisco then touring the United States and Canada
- 2006 Rodolfo Morales: Master of Dreams, Monterrey, Mexico City, Guadalajara, Bogotá, Los Angeles

=== Group Exhibits ===
- 1981 Five Mexican Painters, Tampa Museum of Art, Tampa, Florida
- 1981 National Bank of Mexico City, Mexico City
- 1982 Artists of Oaxaca, Metropolitan Museum, Mexico City
- 1982 Mexican Museum, San Francisco, California
- 1983 Galeria Metropolitana, Universidad Autonoma, Mexico City
- 1983 Casa de la Cultura Jaliscience, Guadalajara, Mexico
- 1984 Galeria Uno, Puerto Vallarta, Mexico
- 1985 Galeria Metropolitana, Universidad Autonoma, Mexico City
- 1986 Museo de Arte Moderno, Mexico City
- 1987 La Plastica Oaxaquena, Galeria del Auditoria Nacional, Mexico City
- 1987 Galeria d'Art de Oaxaca, Oaxaca, Mexico
- 1990 The Heart of Mexico, Riva Yares Gallery, Scottsdale, Arizona
- 1990 Aspects of Contemporary Mexican Art, Americas Society, New York City then traveling to Blue Star Art Space, San Antonio, Texas; Meadows Museum, Dallas, Texas; Santa Monica Museum of Art, Santa Monica, California; Mexican Museum, San Francisco, California
- 1990 Life, Legends and Dreams - Six Painters from Oaxaca, Arizona State University Art Museum, Tempe, Arizona
- 1990 The Heard Museum, Phoenix, Arizona
- 1991 The Charm of Oaxaca, Museo de Arte Contemporáneo de Monterrey, Monterrey
- 1992 New Territories 350/500 years later, Montreal, Quebec, Canada and Regional Museum of Oaxaca
- 1992 Mito y Magia en America: Los Ochenta, Museo de Arte Contemporáneo de Monterrey, Monterrey
- 1993 Death in Mexican Culture, Stuttgart, Germany
- 1993 Oaxaca: Tierra de Colores, Banco Nacional de Obras, Mexico City
- 1994 Myth and Magic: Oaxaca Past and Present, at the Palo Alto Art Center, Palo Alto, California

=== Murals ===
- 1954 Municipal Palace of Ocotlán de Morelos, Oaxaca, Mexico
- 1962 Escuela Preparatoria No. 5, Mexico City
- 1980 Municipal Palace of Ocotlán de Morelos, Oaxaca, Mexico
- 1980 Rincon de los Bosques Restaurant, Mexico City (two murals)
- 1986 Fresco at Escuela Preparatoria No. 5, Mexico City
- 1994 Sheraton Hotel, Mexico City

== Legacy ==
The work of the Rodolfo Morales Foundation continues today attempting to preserve the heritage of Oaxaca and fostering the arts. The Spring Festival in Oaxaca was renamed the Spring Festival Rodolfo Morales in his honour following his death.
