= San Pedro Ocotlán =

- Location within Mexico
- Coordinates: 21°32′00″N 103°18′50″W
- Country: Mexico
- State: Zacatecas
- Municipality: Tepechitlán
- Elevation: 1,900 m (6,200 ft)

Population (2005)
  - Total: 796
- Time zone: UTC-6 (CST)

San Pedro Ocotlán is a town in the Mexican state of Zacatecas. It is one of the smaller settlements in the municipality of Tepechitlán.

In the INEGI 2005 census, it reported a population of 796.
