= San Jerónimo Taviche =

- Municipality and town
- Location in Mexico
- Coordinates: 16°43′N 96°35′W
- Country: Mexico
- State: Oaxaca

Area
  - Total: 213.06 km^{2} (82.26 sq mi)

Population (2005)
  - Total: 1,750
- Time zone: UTC-6 (Central Standard Time)

San Jerónimo Taviche is a town and municipality in Oaxaca in south-western Mexico. The municipality covers an area of 213.06 km^{2}. It is part of the Ocotlán District in the south of the Valles Centrales Region.

As of 2005, the municipality had a total population of 1,750.
