= San Dionisio Ocotlán =

San Dionisio Ocotlan
- Municipality and town
- Location in Mexico
- Coordinates: 16°45′N 96°41′W
- Country: Mexico
- State: Oaxaca

Area
  - Total: 20.41 km^{2} (7.88 sq mi)

Population (2005)
  - Total: 1,093
- Time zone: UTC-6 (Central Standard Time)

San Dionisio Ocotlan is a town and municipality in Oaxaca in south-western Mexico. The municipality covers an area of 20.41 km^{2}. It is part of the Ocotlán District in the south of the Valles Centrales Region.

The town was founded by the Spanish in 1526 and its name roughly translates to the "land between the pines" in Nahuatl.

As of 2005, the municipality had a total population of 1,093.
