= Santo Tomás Jalieza =

- Municipality and town
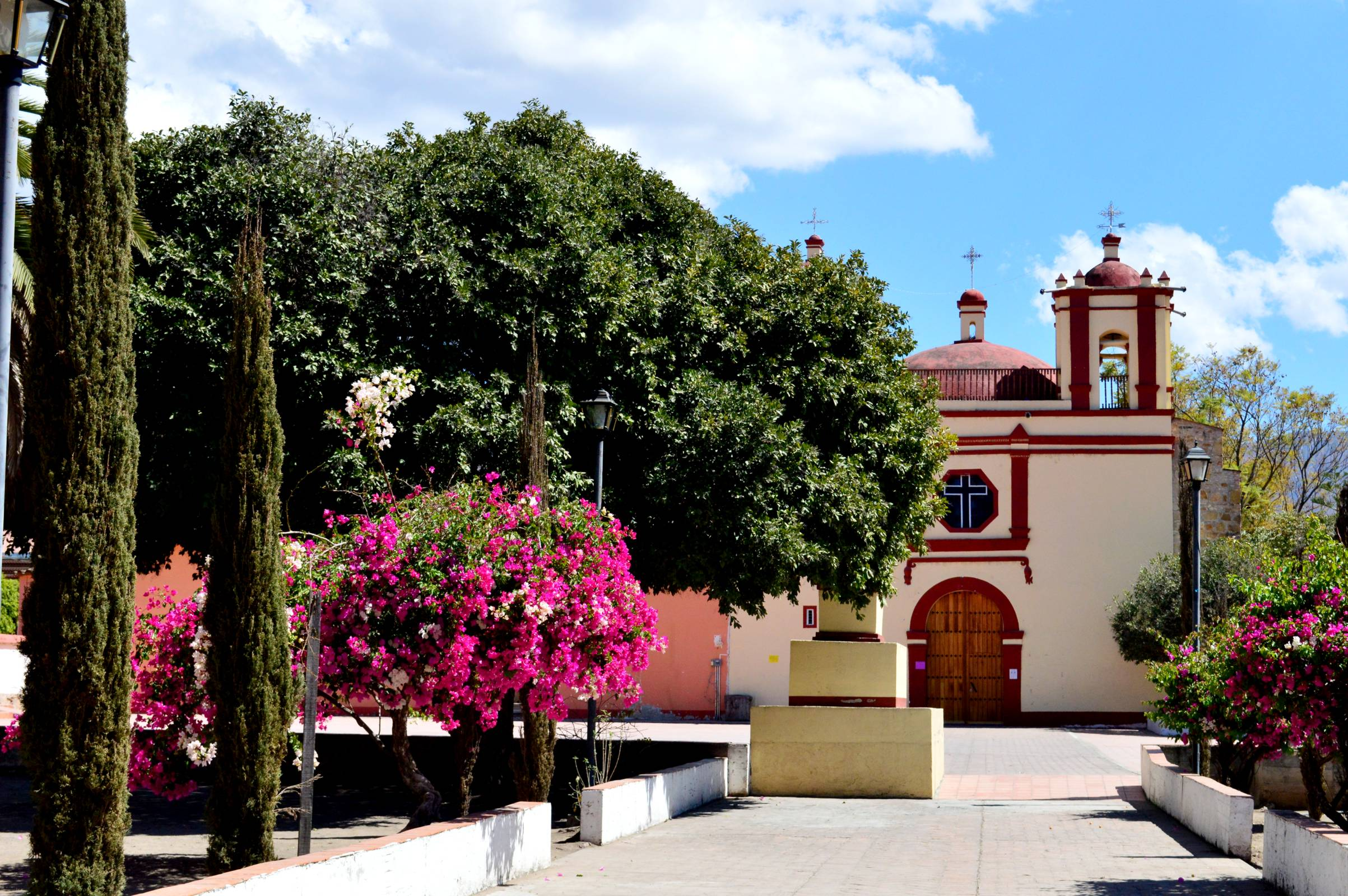

- Location in Mexico
- Coordinates: 16°51′N 96°40′W
- Country: Mexico
- State: Oaxaca
- Elevation: 1,500 m (4,900 ft)

Population (2005)
  - Total: 2,885
- Time zone: UTC-6 (Central Standard Time)

Santo Tomás Jalieza is a town and municipality in Oaxaca in south-western Mexico. It is part of the Ocotlán District in the south of the Valles Centrales Region.

== Geography ==
The municipality covers an area of 51.03 km^{2} at en elevation of 1,500 meters above sea level. Its climate is temperate. The soil is composed of volcanic material overlaying rock at a depth of 10 centimeters or less.

== Demography ==
As of 2005, the municipality had 568 households with a total population of 2,885 of whom 382 people spoke an indigenous language.

== Economy ==
Economic activity includes agriculture, producing maize, beans, wheat, sugarcane and fruits, and cattle rearing. Mezcal is produced in the village. Santo Tomás Jalieza is known as the "town of belts" (cinturones) for the attractive embroidered cloth and leather belts that are made here. The townsfolk have also adapted their designs to clothing, purses and bags.
