= Mixtepec =

Mixtepec may refer to:

== Geography ==
- Magdalena Mixtepec
- San Bernardo Mixtepec
- San Gabriel Mixtepec
- San Juan Mixtepec (disambiguation)
  - San Juan Mixtepec, Miahuatlán
  - San Juan Mixtepec, Mixteca
- San Miguel Mixtepec
- San Pedro Mixtepec (disambiguation)
  - San Pedro Mixtepec, Juquila
  - San Pedro Mixtepec, Miahuatlán
- Santa Cruz Mixtepec

== Languages ==
- Mixtepec Mixtec
- Asunción Mixtepec Zapotec
- Mixtepec Zapotec
- San Agustín Mixtepec Zapotec
- San Miguel Mixtepec Zapotec language
