= Saint Gertrude =

Saint Gertrude, St Gertrude, or St Gertrude's may refer to:

== People ==
- Gertrude of Nivelles (626–659), founded the Abbey of Nivelles located in present-day Belgium
- Gertrude the Great (1256–1302), German Cistercian, mystic, and theologian

== Religious institutions and schools ==
- Church of St. Gertrude, Kaunas, a.k.a. St Gertrude's Church, Kaunas, Lithuania
- German Church, Stockholm, also known as St. Gertrude's Church
- Saint Gertrude High School, an independent college for girls in Richmond, Virginia, U.S.
- St Gertrude New Church, Riga, a church in Riga, Latvia
- St Gertrude Old Church, Riga, a church in Riga, Latvia
- St Gertrude's Abbey, Leuven, a complex of former monastic buildings in Leuven, Belgium
- St. Gertrude's Cathedral, a church in Utrecht, Netherlands
- St. Gertrude's College, New Norcia, a former girls' school associated with the Benedictine Monastery in New Norcia, Western Australia
- St. Gertrude's Convent and Chapel, a Benedictine nunnery near Cottonwood, Idaho, U.S.
- St. Gertrude's Hospital, Copenhagen, a hospital in Copenhagen, Denmark

== See also ==
- Geltrude Comensoli (1847–1903), Patron of Youth, founder of the Institute of the Sacramentine Sisters
- Gertrude of Hackeborn (1223–1292), abbess of the Benedictine convent of Helfta, near Eisleben in modern Germany; sometimes conflated with Gertrude the Great
- Sainte-Gertrude, Quebec, a sector of the city of Bécancour, Quebec, Canada
- Sainte-Gertrude-Manneville, a municipality in Abitibi Regional County, Quebec, Canada
- Santa Gertrudis (disambiguation)
