= Santa Gertrudis =

Santa Gertrudis (Spanish equivalent of Saint Gertrude) may refer to:

== Places ==
=== Canada ===
- Santa Gertrudis-Boca del Infierno Provincial Park, in British Columbia

=== Mexico ===
- Santa Gertrudis, Coahuila, a town in Coahuila state
- Santa Gertrudis, Chihuahua, a town in Saucillo Municipality in the state of Chihuahua

- Santa Gertrudis Air Force Base, located in the town

- Santa Gertrudis, Oaxaca, a town in the state of Oaxaca

- Santa Gertrudis (municipality): municipality centred on that town

- Santa Gertrudis, Veracruz, village in Veracruz, birthplace of Rafael Hernández Ochoa
- Santa Gertrudis de Carbonera, former name of Villa Juárez, San Luis Potosí
- Misión Santa Gertrudis, a mission in the state of Baja California Sur

=== Spain ===
- Santa Gertrudis de Fruitera, a town in the municipality of Santa Eulària des Riu, Eivissa

=== United States ===
- Santa Gertrudis Independent School District, school district in Kingsville, Kleberg County, Texas
- Santa Gertrudis de Lo de Mora, early name of Mora, New Mexico

== Other uses ==
- Santa Gertrudis cattle, a breed of cattle from Texas, United States

== See also ==
- Santa Gertrudes, a municipality in São Paulo, Brazil
