= San Juan Mixtepec =

San Juan Mixtepec may refer to:

== Languages ==
- San Juan Mixtepec Mixtec
- San Juan Mixtepec Zapotec

== Places ==
- San Juan Mixtepec, Miahuatlán, Oaxaca
- San Juan Mixtepec, Mixteca, Oaxaca
