= Boca del Infierno =

Boca del Infierno (Spanish, "Bay of Fury", "Bay of Hell" or "Mouth of Hell") may refer to:

- Santa Gertrudis-Boca del Infierno Provincial Park, a provincial park on Nootka Island in British Columbia, Canada
- A bay in Los Haitises National Park on the remote northeast coast of the Dominican Republic
- A passage off Bahía de Jobos, Puerto Rico
  - Site of the Capture of the sloop Anne, March 1825
