= Ocotlán de Morelos =

Ocotlán
- Town and municipality
- Ocotlán de Morelos
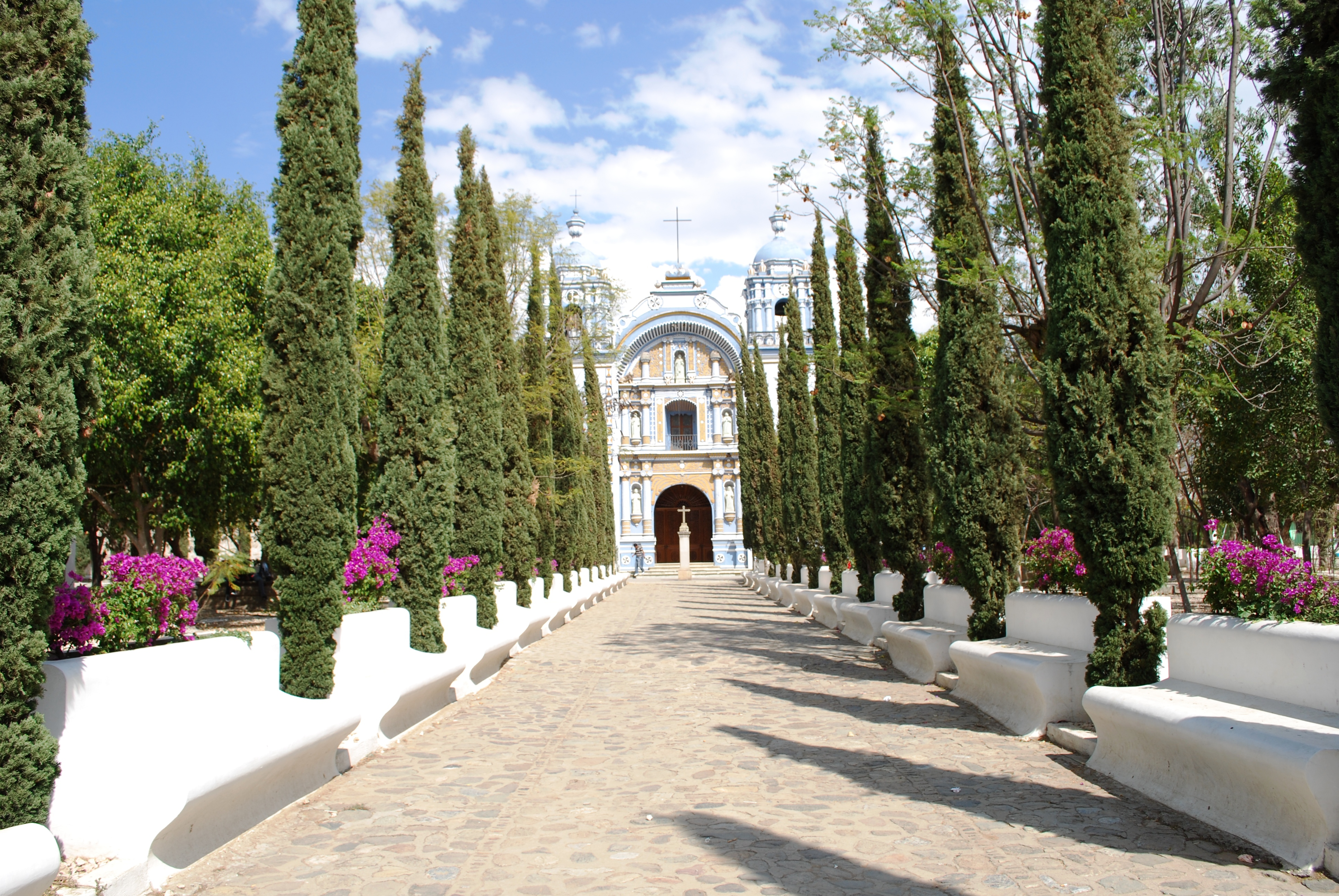
- Atrium and facade of the Temple of Santo Domingo de Guzmán

- Location in Mexico
- Coordinates: 16°47′29″N 96°40′30″W
- Country: Mexico
- State: Oaxaca
- Founded: 1555 (Spanish city)

Government
  - Municipal President: José Villanueva Rodríguez (2014-2016)

Area
  - Municipality: 123.76 km^{2} (47.78 sq mi)
- Elevation (of seat): 1,500 m (4,900 ft)

Population (2005) Municipality
  - Municipality: 19,581
  - Seat: 13,728
- Time zone: UTC-6 (Central (US Central))
- Postal code (of seat): 71510
- Area code: 951

Ocotlán de Morelos is a town and municipality in the state of Oaxaca, about 35 km south of the center of the city of Oaxaca along Highway 175. It is part of the Ocotlán District in the south of the Valles Centrales Region. The area was a significant population center at the time of the Spanish Conquest, and for that reason an important Dominican monastery was established here in the 16th century. The complex still exists, with the church still being used for worship and the cloister area used as a museum. While mostly quiet, the city is an important distribution and transportation center for the south of the Central Valleys region of Oaxaca, a function which is expected to be reinforced with the opening of new highway being built to connect the city of Oaxaca with the Pacific coast. The city is known for artist Rodolfo Morales, who painted aspects of his hometown in his works and sponsored projects to save and restore historic monuments here. For generations the municipality has been known for its crafts, with the ceramics making Aguilar family producing some of the best known craftsmen.

== Etymology ==
The name Ocotlan is from Nahuatl and means "among the ocote trees" with the appendage "de Morelos" added in honor of José María Morelos y Pavón. During the colonial period the area was known as Santo Domingo Ocotlán due to the Dominican friars who created a monastery here dedicated to Saint Dominic. The Zapotec name for the area is "Lachiroo" which means "large valley" although some Zapotecs in the Tlacolula area called it "Guelache" which means "plaza of the valley".

== History ==
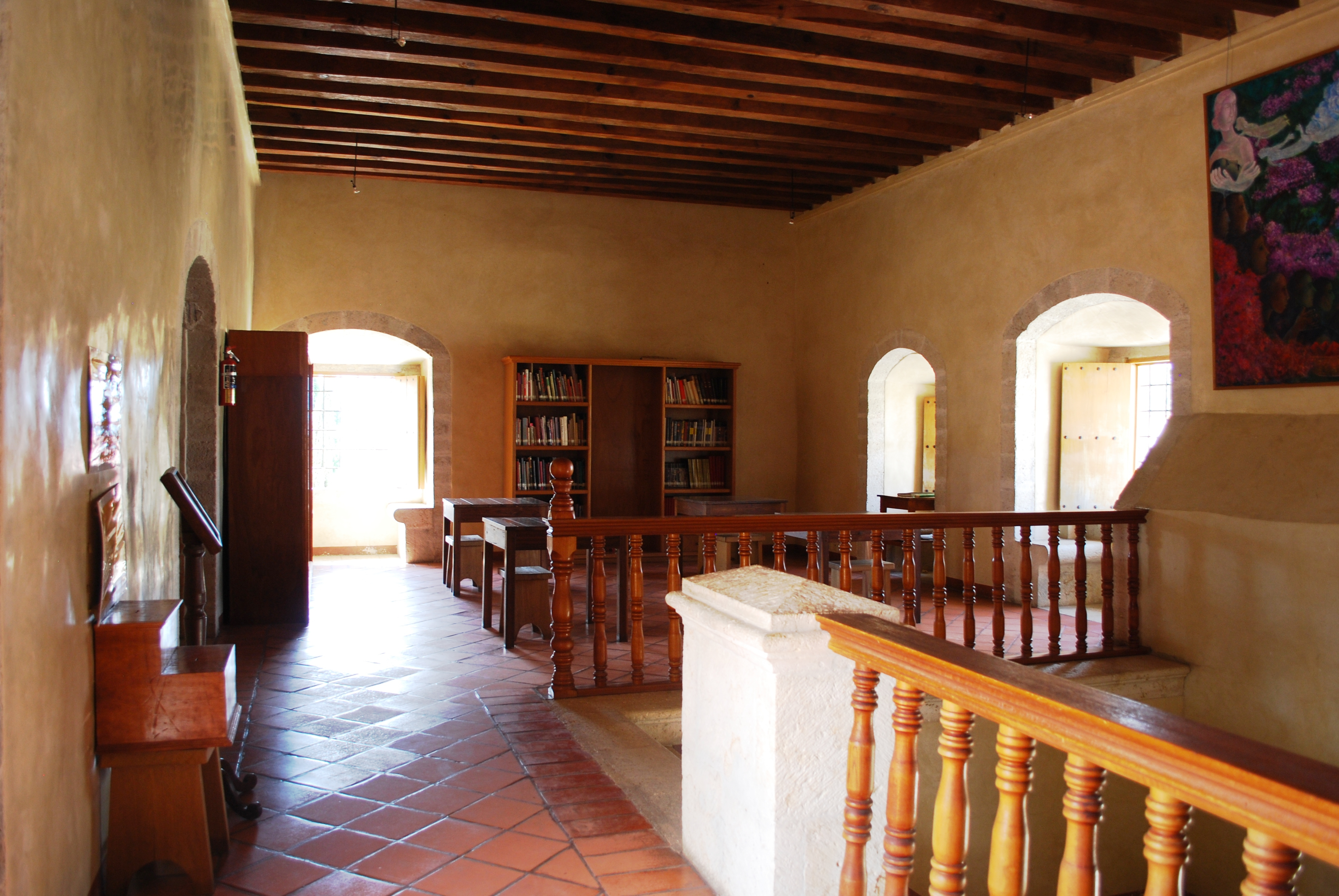
Hall on upper level of the former monastery

The ethnicity of the first populations of this area is not known, but one of the earliest settlements is a site called Tortolita, located two km from the modern town center. When the Spanish arrived, the settlement had about 2,000 inhabitants, which is why the monastery was eventually founded here. In 1538, the bishopric sent Dominicans to found a parish. The monastery was founded in 1555 and called Santo Domingo de Ocotlán. The official founding of the town by Diego Hernandez Domingo Luis and Juan Vazquez also occurred in 1555. The complex was never finished because the local people also worked in the mines established nearby. By the 18th century, Octolan has eight small neighborhoods including one called Santa María Tocuela (the oldest) and San Juan Chilatece in which the market was founded.

During the Mexican War of Independence, Morelos camped here for three days on his way to Acapulco. Ocotlan was officially declared a town in 1875.

In 1916, forces loyal to Venustiano Carranza successfully defended the town from an attack led by General Macario Hernandez. Ocotlan was officially declared a city in 1926.

Since the Mexican Revolution, the city has been mostly quiet but the current construction of a superhighway linking the city of Oaxaca has been bringing changes to the area. The road called Camino Real a San Juan was recently paved, and event that drew the attendance of the governor of Oaxaca. Other newly paved roads include Calle Industria, Calle Francisco Villa and Calle Ayuntamiento. The new paving is meant to relieve traffic congestion on the roads to Ejutla de Crespo and the city of Oaxaca by providing alternate routes for current and future traffic.

In 2006, the social uprisings that affected much of Oaxaca affected Ocotlán. Much of the social unrest centered around the mines that are located in the municipality and consequences continue to this day. A mining labor leader from the area, Napolean Gomez Urrutia, living in Vancouver, is seeking asylum in Canada after the Mexican government asked for his extradition. He is accused of fraud, criminal associated and other offences associated with the social uprisings. Before he left for Canada, Gomez Urrutia was demanding an investigation into the deaths of 65 workers at a coal mine in the area. In 2009, protesters from several communities in the municipality blocked a highway to demand the cancellation of an arrest warrant against residents who opposed the operation of a mine and demand talks to close the La Trinidad mine. The mine belongs to a Mexican-Canadian company called Cuxcatlan. Protesters claim the mine is polluting their lands. The protesters were supported by Section 22 of the SNTE and APPO.

An unrelated controversy in 2008 involved child pornography charges against the Colegio Guadalupe school. Implicated are several parents and photographer Norberto Dionisio Martinez. The photographs in question involved partially nude women, men and children in a classroom at the school. Angry parents have protested and sued the school although those involved claimed no pornographic acts were involved.

== The city ==
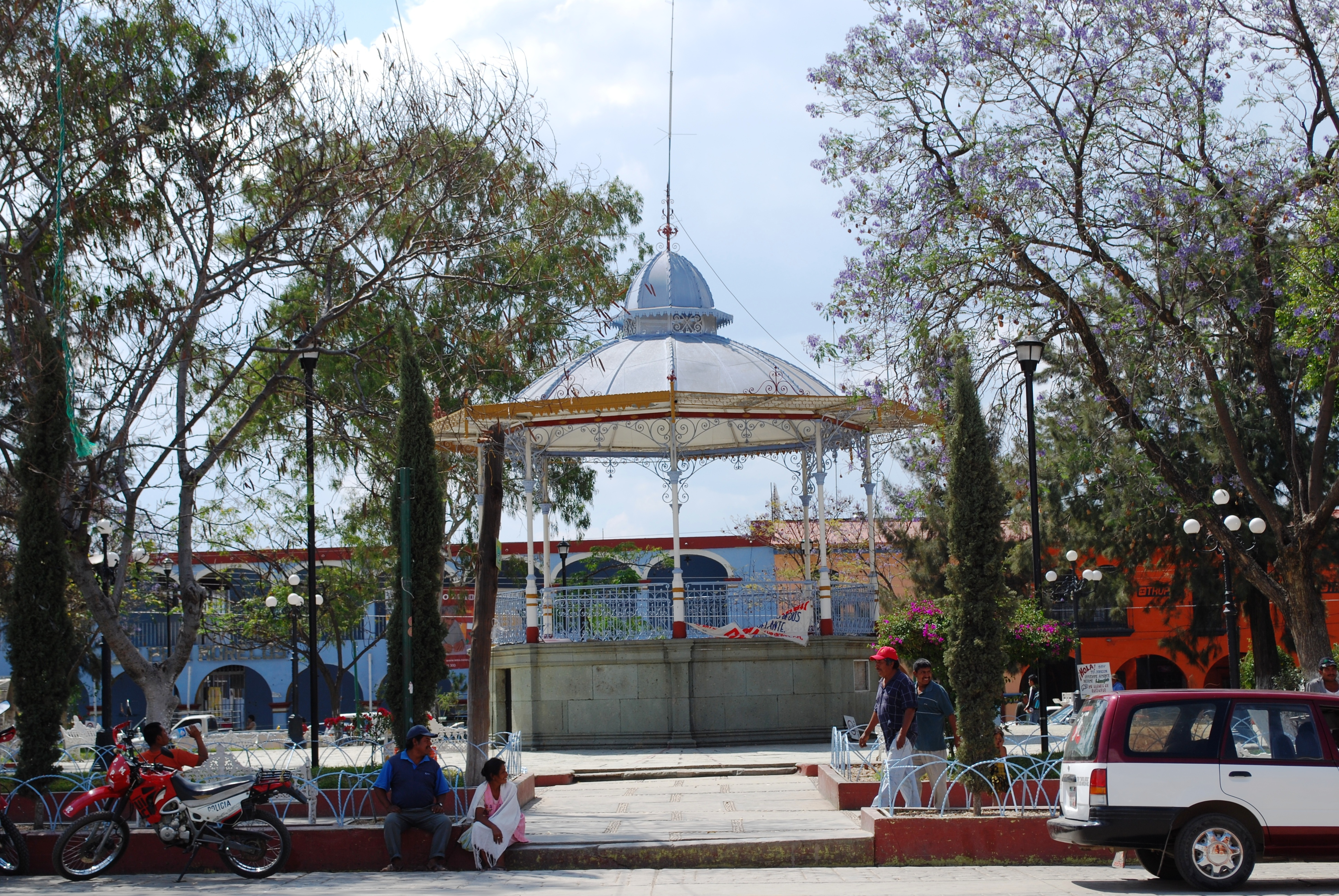
Kiosk in the main plaza

The city can seem like an ordinary and even empty town at first glance. However, because of its geographic location on the south end of the Central Valleys region of Oaxaca, the city is a distribution center for local towns and smaller cities such as Santa Lucía Miahuatlán. It is also a point of transit for those traveling between the state capital and the coast, a role that will be enforced with the completion of the new modern highway. One reason the area is relatively quiet is that for many years, until recently, its churches, monastery, plazas and gardens lay unkempt against the effects of the sun and time, as well as vandalism. Most of the restoration work was sponsored by artist Rodolfo Morales, a native of Ocotlán.

The city's main attraction is the Temple and Ex-convent of Santo Domingo de Guzmán. The complex was constructed in various stages between the 16th and 19th centuries. The construction of the monastery was halted on several occasions due to the lack of manpower, due to the discovery of mines nearby such as Santa Catarina. The main vault, apse, choir and sacristy of the church were not finished until 1669. The pillars of the cloister were begun at this time as well, but were never finished.

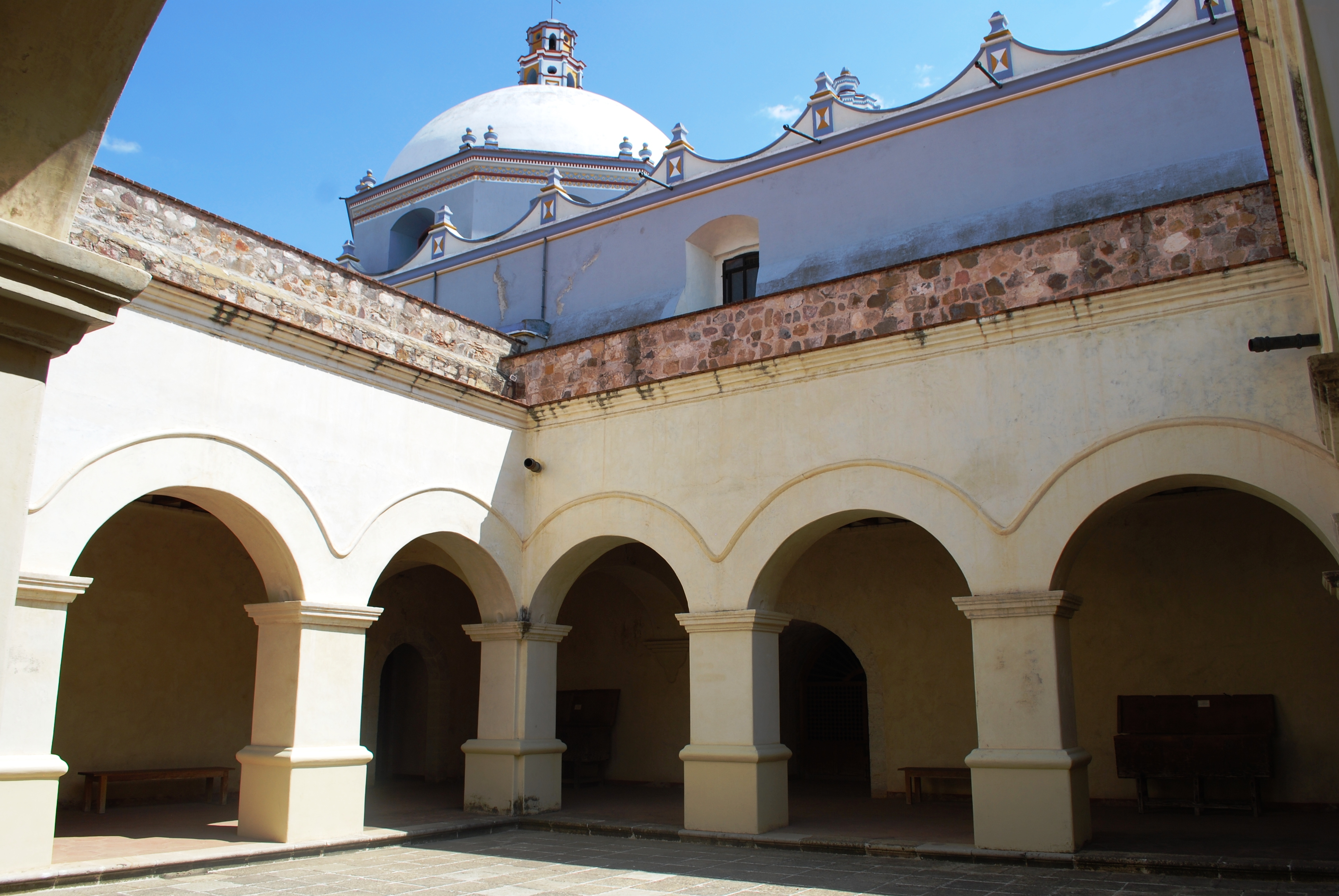
Courtyard of monastery with church behind

From then until the early 19th century, much of the complex was poorly maintained and fell into ruins. Starting in 1804, the Dominicans worked to rehabilitate the building, with attempts continuing until the complex was appropriated by the federal government during the Reform Laws. Ocotlan was one of the last towns in Oaxaca to still have friars in residence in the 19th century but by 1855, the last one had left. By 1885, the monastery area was completely abandoned, but the church was still functioning and remaining in relatively good condition.

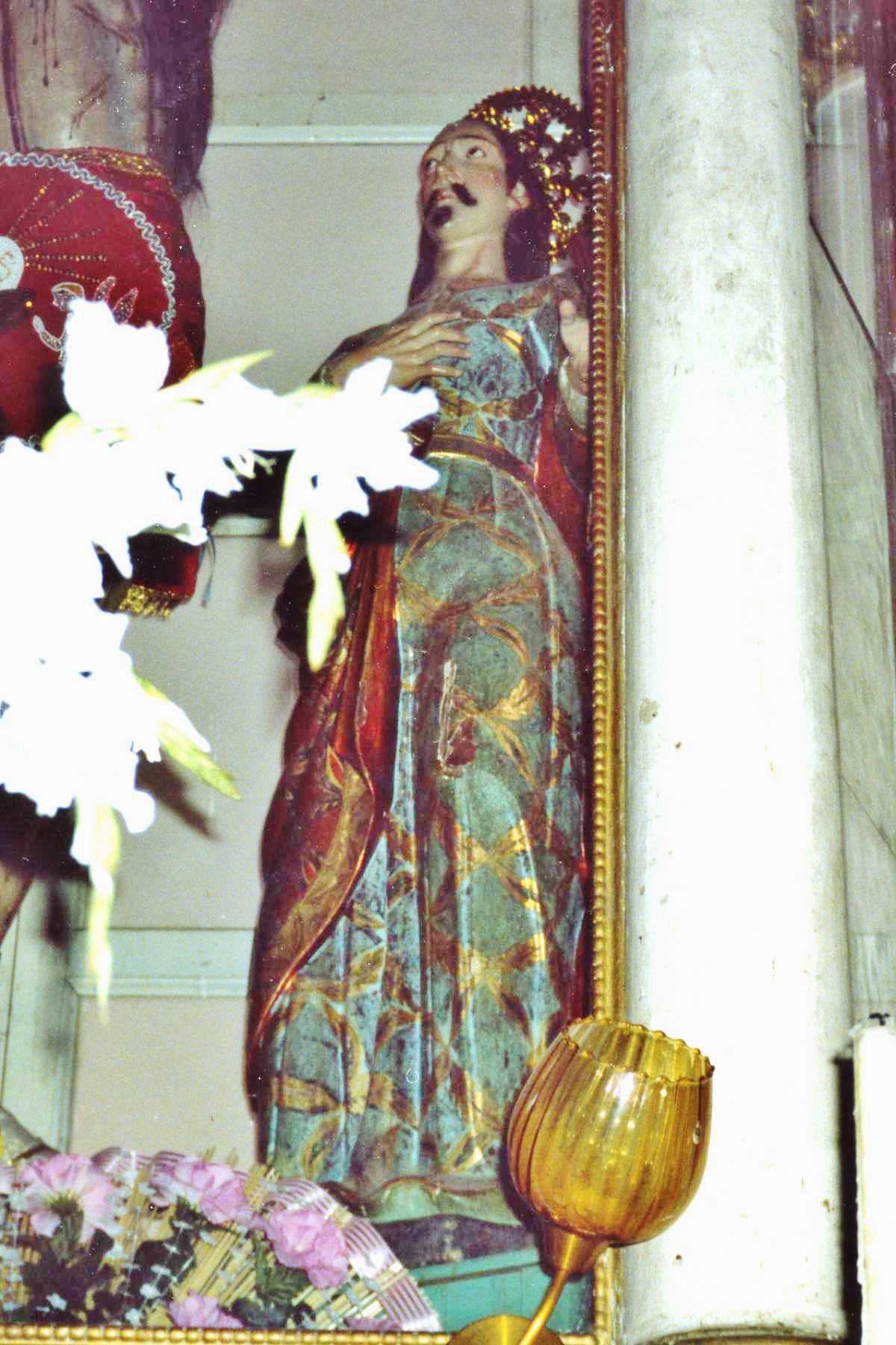
Santo of Saint John, from the Chapel of the Señor de la Sacristia

After it was no longer used as a monastery, the complex has several uses, including that of a prison, where inmates made crafts. In the latter 20th century, the Rodolfo Morales Foundation restored and converted the monastery space into a museum, which contains one room with works by Morales, one room with Oaxaca crafts and one room with artwork from the colonial period. There are also sound and book libraries. In the courtyard where the old pillory is, are held cultural events and photography shoots. The church was also restored by the foundation, but maintains its religious function.

The church is fronted by a very large atrium fenced by a stone wall. The main facade has two bodies and a crest with both Baroque and Neoclassical elements. The first body contains the door arch and the second is marked by the choir window. Both bodies are flanked by columns with Ionic order capitols. The columns extend up the facade and have profuse vegetative decoration. At the top, there is a shell. In the interior is the Chapel of the Senor de la Sacristia, which is decorated in Neoclassical style. In both the church and the chapel are found a large number of colonial-era santos (statues of saints), many executed in fine polychrome and well preserved.

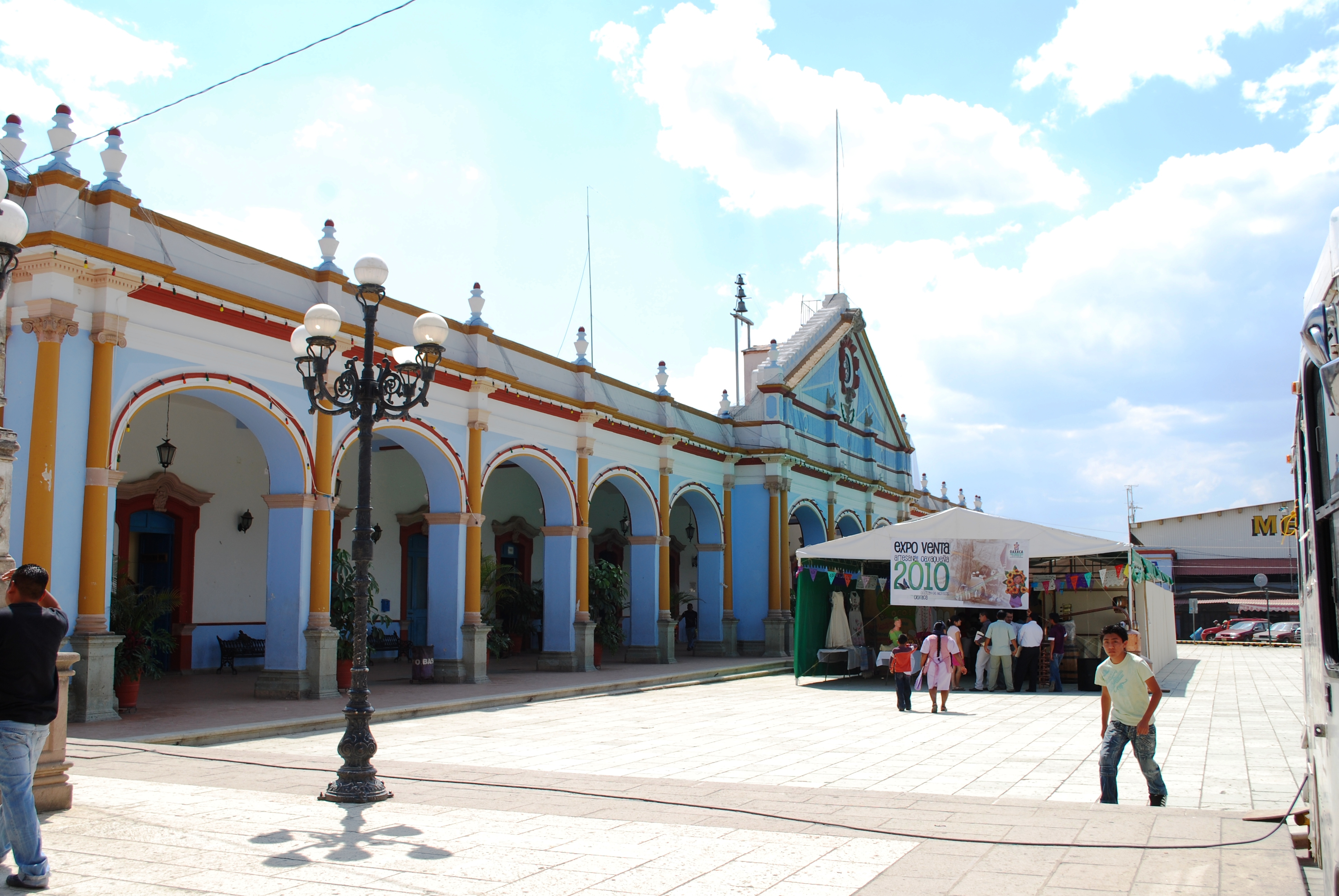
Municipal palace

The municipal palace has a sober Neoclassic facade built with pink stone, with columns and pediments. The main feature are the arches which rest on columns with rectangular bases, forming portals. It was designed to be a focus point for social interaction. The main feature of the interior is the mural work done in the council chambers by Rodolfo Morales in the 1950s, when he was a young man. The mural work depicts scenes from the history of Ocotlán as well as landscapes and representative scenes such as the municipality markets, mining and agriculture. Unfortunately, this work does not receive the care it deserves as the chambers have been used for storage as well as meetings. This palace was constructed to commemorate the Centennial of Mexican Independence which occurred in 1910, and was completed in 1913.

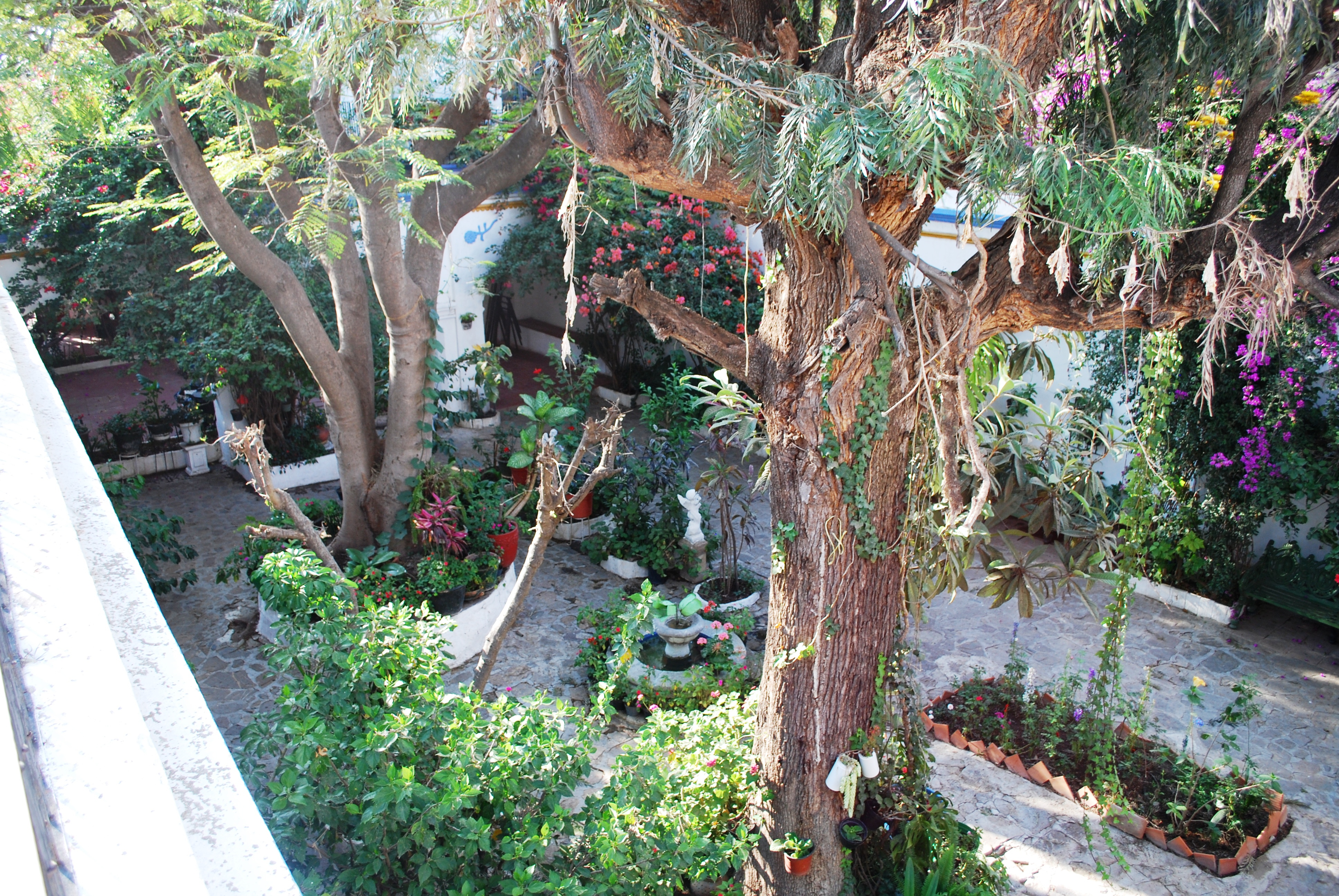
Courtyard of the Morales house

The Rodolfo Morales house is a mansion from the 18th century which he rescued and lived in. Today, the building is a cultural center with an open-air theatre, which can seat 200 people, galleries of work by local artists and a computer center. All activities and resources here are offered free of charge. The house is located just north of the main square and preserves a number of Morales personal effects, including collages. The building is also home to the Fundación Cultural Rodolfo Morales, A. C (Rodolfo Morales Cultural Foundation), which is a private, nonprofit organization which promotes education and culture in the Ocotlan District of the state of Oaxaca. The Foundation realizes restorations, the maintenance and conservation of architectural monuments, paintings and sculptures and trains young people in restoration work. The foundation was created in 1992 by Rodolfo Morales. The Octolan railroad station was built along the old Ferrocarril San Jerónimo to San Pablo Huixtepec line in 1906. In 1909, a second platform was built.

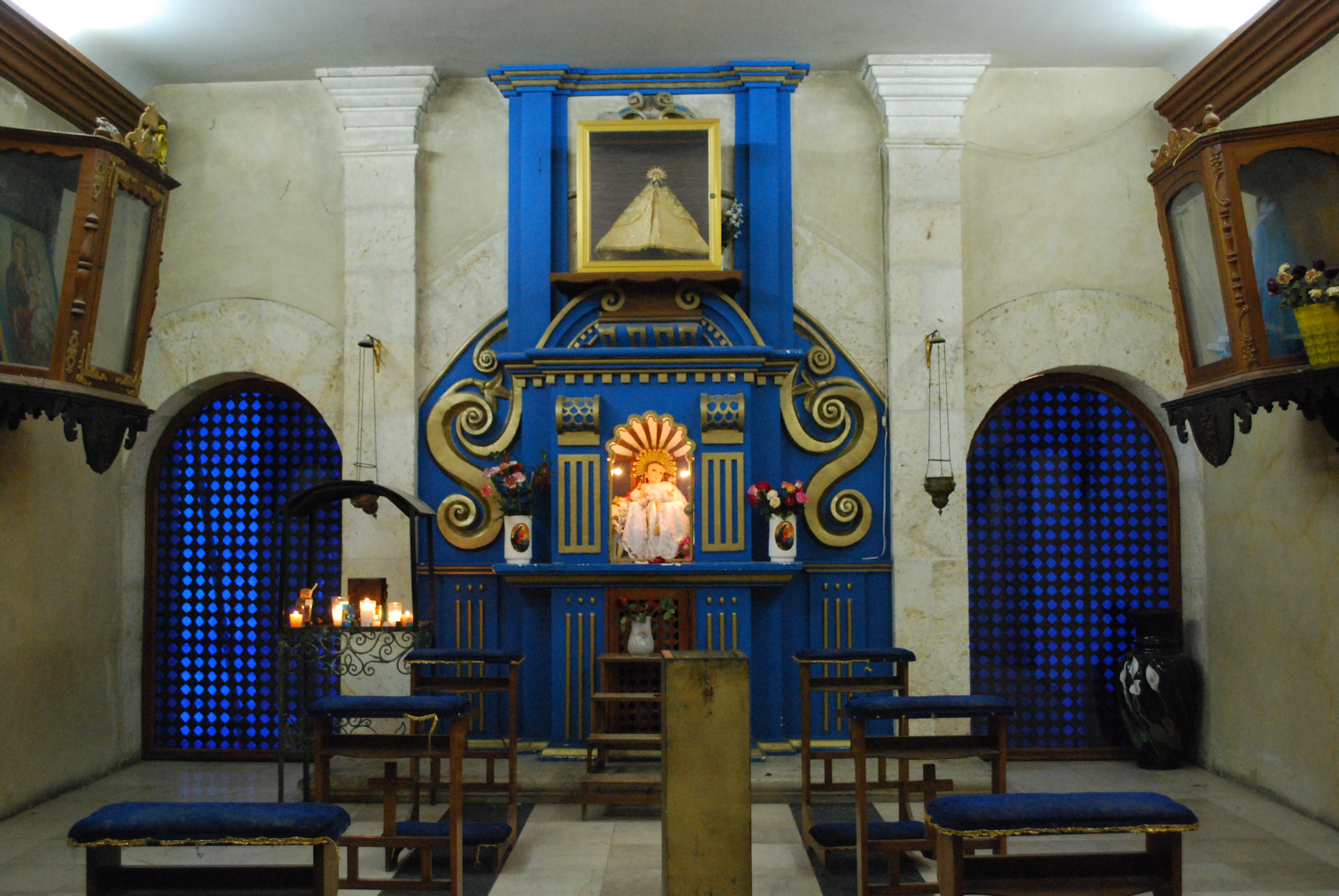
The Virgin of Ocotlán

A number of important traditions are maintained in the community. The feast of the Virgin of Ocotlán is celebrated on 15 May. Most of the festivities take place on the main square of the town with live music and regional food, especially tamales and atole. The feast of the Señor de la Sacristia is celebrated on the third Sunday in May. One old tradition that is still maintained is a dancing procession to bring the bride and groom their wedding gifts to their new home. However, the most important tradition is the weekly Friday market day (tianguis), which is one of the oldest and largest in the Central Valleys region of Oaxaca. Produce and products from surrounding towns are available as well as manufactured products. Market day is not just buying and selling for rural and indigenous communities, it is a festive ritual which has been held regularly for thousands of years, attracting both locals and families from small outlying villages to both buy and sell. It is an opportunity for many to socialize with distant neighbors. Market day begins very early for both residents and those who travel to the town to sell. Many products such as plants, flowers, fruit, lime for tortillas, live animals, fabric, ceramics, baskets, knives, saddles, hats, rope, alebrijes, traditional footwear and drinks such as mezcal and tejate. Many of the products are the crafts produced by other towns in the Central Valleys region of Oaxaca, such as textiles of Jalietza, and San Antonino Castillo Velasco and the alebrijes of San Martín Tilcajete. Prepared regional specialties are also offered here and the adjacent permanent municipal market. Some of the traditional foods here include several types of mole (negro, rojo, Amarillo, coloradito and more), chichilo, tasajo, tamales in banana leaves and tacos with chapulines (fried grasshoppers). Another favorite is ice cream in flavors such as nut, cactus fruit, guanabana, horchata and others. Sweet breads such as "mamones" "rosquitas" "marquezotes" and coconut tortillas are popular as well. Most of the food products are locally made, including chapulines, animal crackers made with piloncillo and ice cream.

The eighth campus of the Nova Universitas University, part of the SUNEO system, was inaugurated by Oaxaca governor Ulises Ruiz Ortiz in the city. The college focuses on providing educational opportunities to indigenous populations. Professors give classes both in person at the campus and provide distance learning through big screens in remote classrooms with special monitors to allow student-teacher dialogue. The distance learning scheme allows students in Ocotlan to study with professors from other parts of the state and even attend classes offered in foreign countries. The first degrees offered are Computer Science and Agricultural Science. The school also offered adult and remedial education.

The city has a tuna ensemble called the "Tuna Universitaria Santo Domingo de Guzman." This group organizes recitals such as the one in December 2009 for Christmas, inviting other tuna ensembles. The ensemble was founded in 1978 with the objective of preserving the music and traditions associated with the musical style and receives funding from Oaxaca state as well as from private sources.

== Arts and handcrafts ==
=== Rodolfo Morales ===
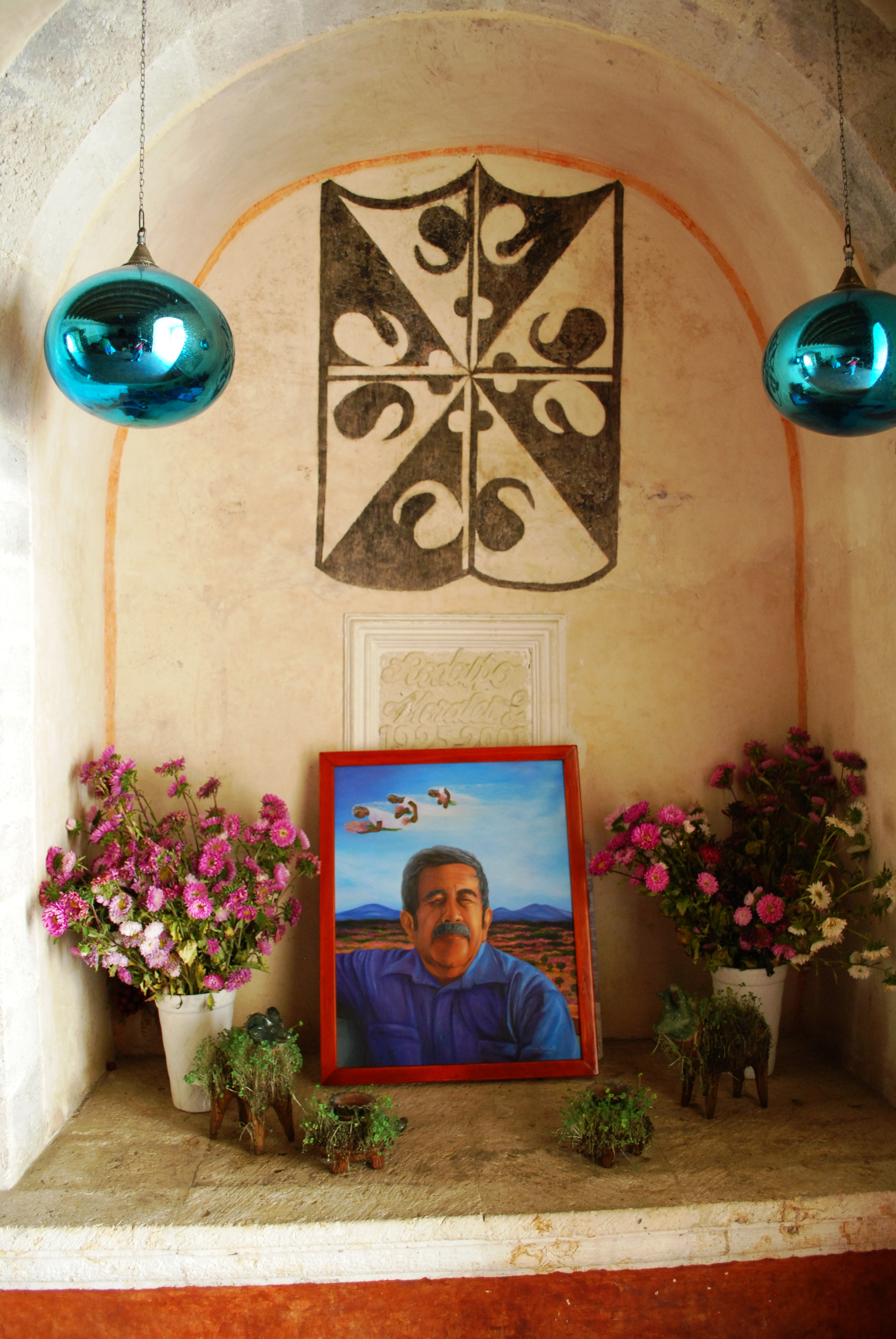
Shrine to Morales at entrance to museum/monastery

The town is intimately linked with the life of painter Rodolfo Morales. He has depicted it in his works and has worked to save many of its historic and architectural treasures. The artist's work is devoted to images from this hometown, including local churches, indigenous women, religious procession and others. Art critic Julio Cesar Schara states that Ocotlan is a down without grace or major heroes but Morales reinvented the area with his own imagination, painting Neoclassic palaces, angels, fairies to express how he felt about the place. One of his last works called "Mercados" depicts market scenes from the town painted on columns.

Rodolfo Morales' career as an artist developed in fits and starts. In the 1950s, Morales was commissioned to do the mural work in the municipal palace of Ocotlan, painting it with historical and current scenes related to the municipality. Much of this mural work shows similarities to mural work done by Diego Rivera. From that time to the 1970s, Morales remained in obscurity, teaching art privately and for a UNAM affiliated preparatory school. In the 1970s, his work was discovered by Mexican painter Rufino Tamayo, when Morales was in his 50s. This later work was more surreal than that of the mural he painted when he was younger. From the time of his discovery by Tamayo until 1986, Morales continued to work at the preparatory school even though his work was being sold in Europe, Mexico and the United States. In 1986, Morales retired from teaching to paint full-time. The production from this time period brought him fame and fortune, allowing him to sponsor civic projects in his hometown. In 1992, he established the Rodolfo Morales Foundation dedicated to fomenting the culture of Oaxaca and supporting the youth of Ocotlan. The artist died in 2001. Much of the restoration work in the monastery and church were done by Morales himself, including feminizing the angels and making the faces more solemn. While Morales is Ocotlán's best known creative mind, the town has been associated with crafts for generations. Some of the crafts still practiced here include basketry, textiles in the form of rebozos and other traditional clothing embroidered in silk thread, blade making, saddlemaking and miniatures in lead. The town is known for its red clay pottery, which is often painted in various colors. Octolan is part of a stretch of road on which are a number of crafts towns such as San Bartolo Coyotepec, San Martin Tilcajete, Santo Tomás Jlietza and Santa Ana Zegache.

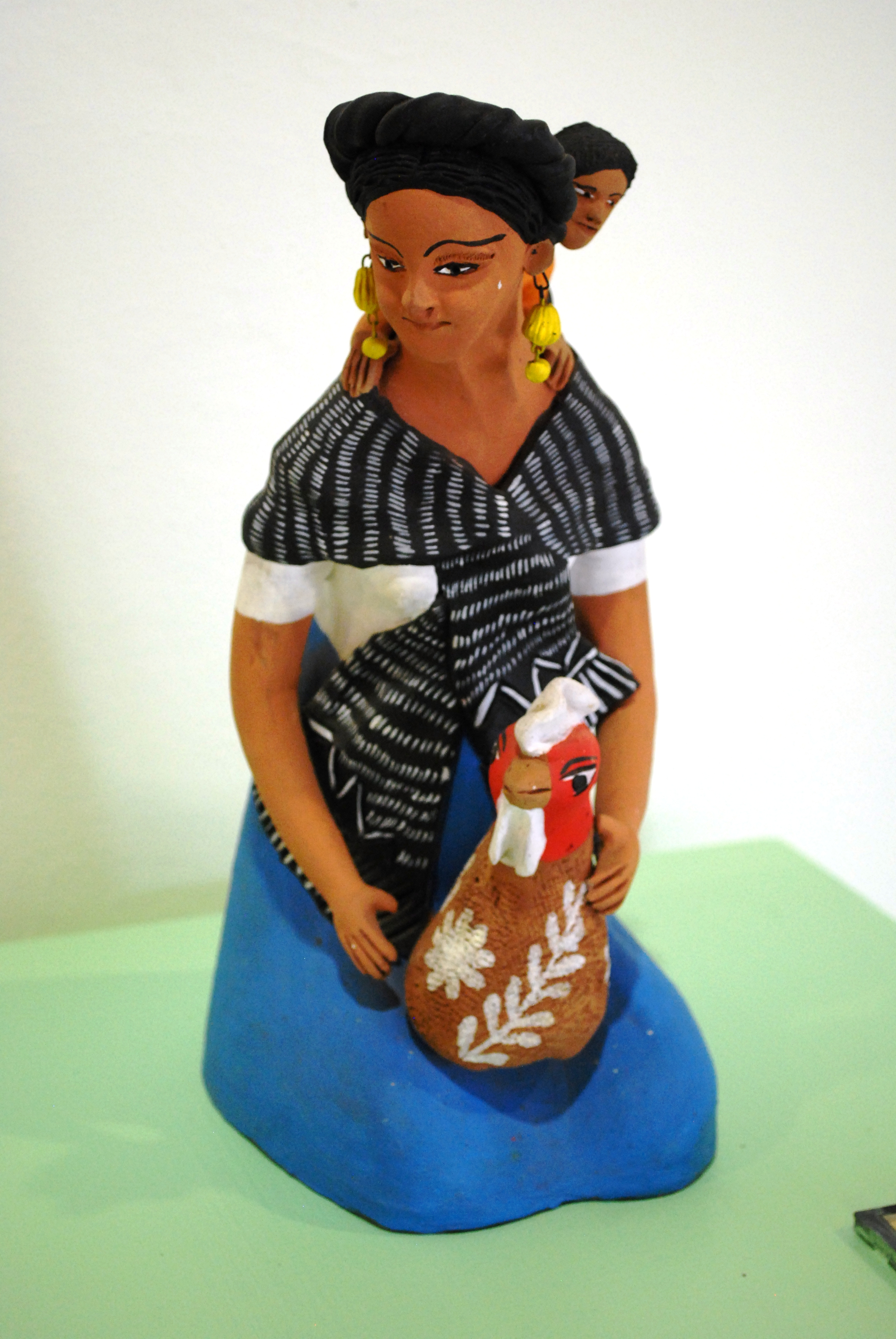
"Mujer con Niño" by Guillermina Aguilar Alcantara at the MEAPO Museum.

=== Crafts and artisans ===
While the men dominate the rug-weaving and woodcarving industries in Oaxaca, the women reign with their pottery. This is true in Ocotlan as well. The best known pottery family in Ocotlan is the Aguilar. The dynasty begins with potter Isaura Alcantara Diaz, a potter. Isaura learned the traditional pottery making techniques of the Oaxaca Valley, which was mostly limited to making utilitarian items. She began to experiment with figures and more decorative pieces, with some of her pieces making their way into the Rockefeller collection, but died prematurely at the age of 44. Before she died, she taught potting to her children Josefina, Guillermina, Irene, Concepción and Jesús. Due to their mother's death, the children began working early, with Josefina being only seven. Poverty prevented the children from attending school. Like their mother, they began and mostly made pots and other kitchen utensils but they also worked to develop clay figures. Over time, these siblings became renowned for their fanciful painted clay figures that celebrate everyday life. Today, these siblings still work and much of the third generation are craftsmen as well. Some, such as Demetrio Garcia Aguilar, are making a name for themselves as well.

Josefina Aguilar has been noted for her ceramic work since 1977 when she won the third Premio Nacional de Arte (National Art Prize) in 1977. Later, she would win statewide and other nationwide honors and would show her work internationally in places such as the United States and Europe, and her work can be found around the world. Guillermina Aguilar Alcantara is known for her nativity scenes, wedding scenes, candle sticks and other works done in clay. She and her sister Irene have also won a number of awards and has exported her wares to over a dozen countries. Much of this exporting success was due to a grant by Fomento Cultural Banamex which allowed the family operation to purchase shipping equipment.

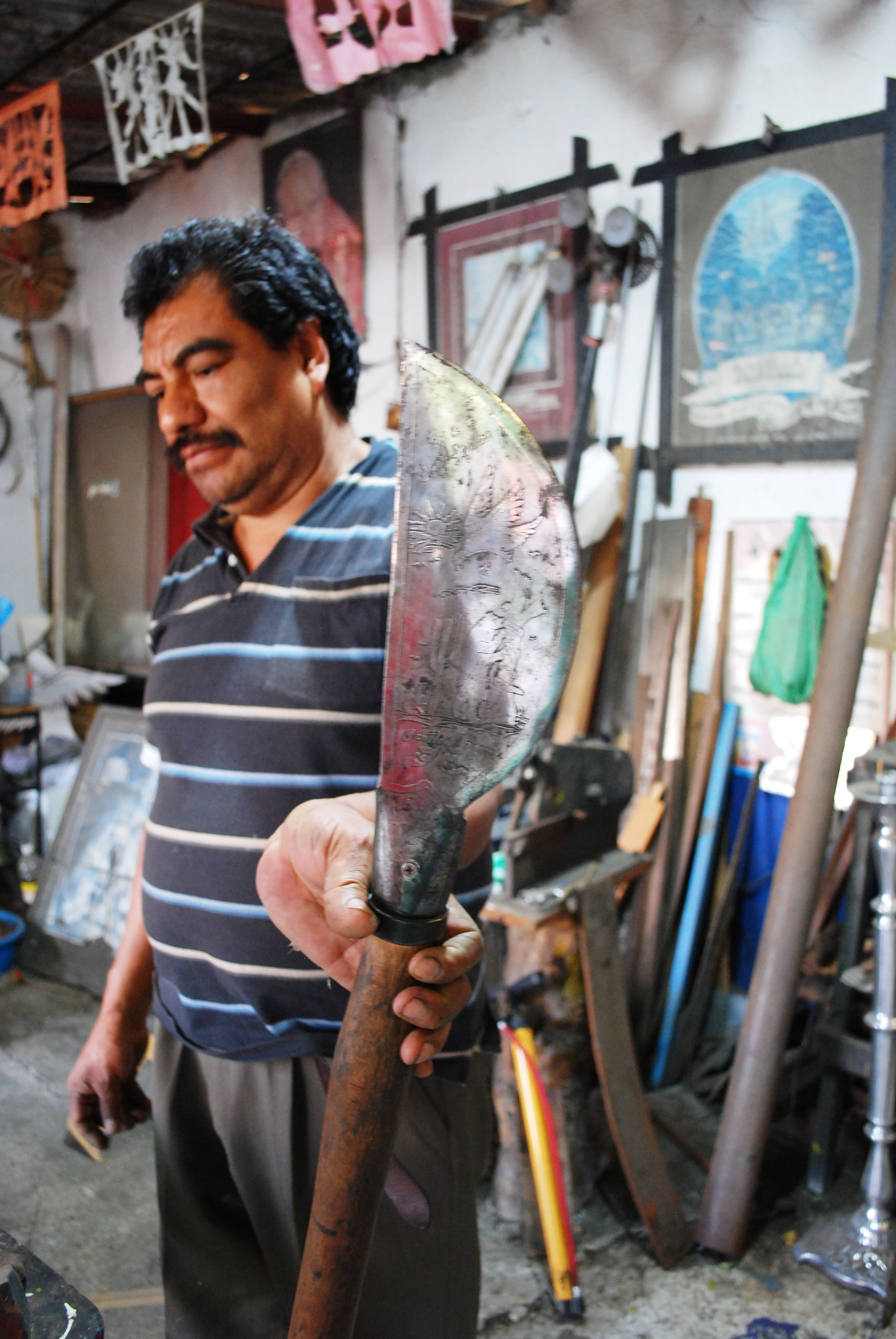
Apolinar Aguilar Velasco and one of his blades

Another known craftsman is Angel Aguilar, who is known for making knives, swords, machetes and the like using the same techniques as those used in the 16th century. Aguilar began making blades when he was ten, taught by his father and uncle. He is now teaching the craft to the next generation.

== The municipality ==
As municipal seat, the city of Ocotlán de Morelos is the government authorities for about forty other localities with the most populous outside the seat being Praxedis de Guerrero (1530), San Pedro Guegorexe (813) and Tejas de Morelos (688). However, over seventy percent of the municipality's population of 19,581 lives in the city proper. The municipality borders the municipalities of Santa Ana Zegache, San Martín Tilcajete, San Juan Chilateca, San Antonino Castillo Velasco, Santiago Apóstol, Ejutla de Crespo, Santa Catarina Minas, San Dionisio Ocotlán, San Pedro Mártir, Asunción Ocotlán, San Pedro Apóstol, Magdalena Ocotlán, Santa Inés Yatzeche and Santa Gertrudis.

The territory's geography varies from mountains to flat valley area with some rolling hills. Principle elevations include Yavitise, and Guevexco which are part of the mountain region located to the east and Santa Catarina Minas and San Miguel Tilquiapam to the west. The main surface water is the Ocotlan River, which is a tributary of the Atoyac. Other rivers include the Chilana, Santa Rosa, Rio Grande, Riod Chichicapan, San Pablo, Taviche, Atoyac, Guanibay, Rio Bravo, La Garzona, Del Panteon and Paraiso. In addition there are intermittent streams that principally flow during the rainy season. The climate is temperate with some variation in temperature during the year and a moderate rainy season in the summer and early autumn. Most of the municipality's flora and fauna has been disturbed by man, with flat areas converted into farmland or settlements. Forests of pine and ocote still exist in the higher elevations.

There are deposits of gold, silver, iron, coal, lead, copper, zinc, antimony, titanium, asbestos and other minerals.

Most of the population is involved in agriculture (23%), crafts and manufacturing (28%) and commerce (45%). One major crop is the castor oil plant, along with corn, beans and various fruit trees. Livestock includes cattle, pigs, goats and domestic fowl. There is a processing plant which makes vegetable oil, with mezcal and dairy products produced in small workshops. Crafts include textiles and ceramics. Most working in commerce has small family businesses.

The municipality of Ocotlan de Morelos has 8 municipal agencies of Buenavista, Praxedis de Guerrero, Texas De Morelos, San Cristóbal Ixcatlán, San Felipe Apóstol, San Jacinto Chilateca, San Jacinto Ocotlán, and San Pedro Guegorexe. also has 5 Police Agencies.

== See also ==
- Category: Mexican potters
