= Chilateca =

Chilateca may refer to:

- San Jacinto Chilateca, Oaxaca
- San Juan Chilateca, Oaxaca
