= Ayoquezco de Aldama =

- Municipality and town
- Location in Mexico
- Coordinates: 16°41′N 96°47′W
- Country: Mexico
- State: Oaxaca

Area
  - Total: 58.69 km^{2} (22.66 sq mi)

Population (2020)
  - Total: 4,874
- Time zone: UTC-6 (Central Standard Time)

Ayoquezco de Aldama from náhuatl “Ayotl” turtle, “quiza” come out “co” in 'where the turtles come out', and from zapoteco "Gɨdxón" 'swampy place', is a town and municipality in Oaxaca in south-western Mexico. The municipality covers an area of 58.69 km^{2}. It is part of the Zimatlán District in the west of the Valles Centrales Region.

As of 2020, the municipality had a total population of 4,874.
