= San Miguel Mixtepec =

- Municipality and town
- Location in Mexico
- Coordinates: 16°47′N 96°59′W
- Country: Mexico
- State: Oaxaca

Area
  - Total: 48.48 km^{2} (18.72 sq mi)

Population (2005)
  - Total: 2,387
- Time zone: UTC-6 (Central Standard Time)

San Miguel Mixtepec is a town and municipality in Oaxaca in south-western Mexico. The municipality covers an area of 48.48 km^{2}. It is part of the Zimatlán District in the west of the Valles Centrales Region.

As of 2005, the municipality had a total population of 2,387.
