= Santa Ana Tlapacoyan =

- Municipality and town
- Location in Mexico
- Coordinates: 16°45′N 96°49′W
- Country: Mexico
- State: Oaxaca
- Time zone: UTC-6 (Central Standard Time)

Santa Ana Tlapacoyan is a town and municipality in Oaxaca in south-western Mexico. The municipality covers an area of km^{2}. It is part of the Zimatlán District in the west of the Valles Centrales Region.

As of 2005, the municipality had a total population of .

== Climate ==
Climate data for Santa Ana Tlapacoyan (1991–2020)
Month	Jan	Feb	Mar	Apr	May	Jun	Jul	Aug	Sep	Oct	Nov	Dec	Year
Record high °C (°F)	29 (84)	30 (86)	31 (88)	31 (88)	33 (91)	32 (90)	29 (84)	30 (86)	34 (93)	33 (91)	30 (86)	29 (84)	34 (93)
Mean daily maximum °C (°F)	20.6 (69.1)	22.7 (72.9)	24.6 (76.3)	25.6 (78.1)	25.5 (77.9)	23.6 (74.5)	22.4 (72.3)	22.5 (72.5)	21.9 (71.4)	21.8 (71.2)	21.0 (69.8)	20.8 (69.4)	22.8 (72.9)
Daily mean °C (°F)	13.3 (55.9)	15.1 (59.2)	16.7 (62.1)	18.1 (64.6)	18.3 (64.9)	17.4 (63.3)	16.6 (61.9)	16.7 (62.1)	16.4 (61.5)	15.7 (60.3)	14.3 (57.7)	13.6 (56.5)	16.0 (60.8)
Mean daily minimum °C (°F)	6.0 (42.8)	7.6 (45.7)	8.9 (48.0)	10.6 (51.1)	11.2 (52.2)	11.3 (52.3)	10.7 (51.3)	10.9 (51.6)	11.0 (51.8)	9.5 (49.1)	7.6 (45.7)	6.4 (43.5)	9.3 (48.8)
Record low °C (°F)	−2 (28)	−1 (30)	−2 (28)	3.5 (38.3)	2 (36)	6 (43)	1 (34)	6 (43)	2 (36)	2 (36)	−1 (30)	−0.5 (31.1)	−4.4 (24.1)
Average precipitation mm (inches)	11.6 (0.46)	10.0 (0.39)	19.4 (0.76)	24.1 (0.95)	50.4 (1.98)	113.7 (4.48)	122.2 (4.81)	139.8 (5.50)	129.6 (5.10)	61.3 (2.41)	21.6 (0.85)	8.5 (0.33)	712.2 (28.02)
Source: Servicio Meteorologico Nacional
