= San Antonino El Alto =

- Municipality and town
- Location in Mexico
- Coordinates: 16°49′N 96°41′W
- Country: Mexico
- State: Oaxaca

Area
  - Total: 65.07 km^{2} (25.12 sq mi)

Population (2005)
  - Total: 2,445
- Time zone: UTC-6 (Central Standard Time)

San Antonino El Alto is a town and municipality in Oaxaca in southwestern Mexico. The municipality covers an area of 65.07 km^{2}. It is part of the Zimatlán District in the west of the Valles Centrales Region.

In 2005, the municipality had a population of 2,445.

El Alto Zapotec is spoken in the town.
