= Zimatlán District =

- District
- Oaxaca regions and districts: Valles Centrales in the center
- Coordinates: 16°52′N 96°47′W
- Country: Mexico
- State: Oaxaca

Population (2020)
  - Total: 58,667

Zimatlán District is located in the west of the Valles Centrales Region of the State of Oaxaca, Mexico.

== Municipalities ==
The district includes the following municipalities:

Municipality code	Name	Population		Land Area			Population density	
Municipality code	Name	2020	Rank	km^{2}	sq mi	Rank	2020	Rank
398	Ayoquezco de Aldama	4,874	3	104.4	40.3	4	47/km^{2} (121/sq mi)	8
013	Ciénega de Zimatlán	3,043	5	10.27	3.97	11	296/km^{2} (767/sq mi)	2
048	Magdalena Mixtepec	1,433	11	41.02	15.84	8	35/km^{2} (90/sq mi)	10
104	San Antonino El Alto	2,705	8	105.3	40.7	3	26/km^{2} (67/sq mi)	12
123	San Bernardo Mixtepec	2,829	7	108.7	42.0	2	26/km^{2} (67/sq mi)	11
295	San Pablo Huixtepec	10,020	2	43.30	16.72	7	231/km^{2} (599/sq mi)	3
358	Santa Ana Tlapacoyan	1,958	10	46.66	18.02	6	42/km^{2} (109/sq mi)	9
369	Santa Catarina Quiané	2,193	9	20.68	7.98	10	106/km^{2} (275/sq mi)	4
378	Santa Cruz Mixtepec	3,720	4	46.86	18.09	5	79/km^{2} (206/sq mi)	6
387	Santa Gertrudis	2,891	6	30.37	11.73	9	95/km^{2} (247/sq mi)	5
389	Santa Inés Yatzeche	908	12	2.413	0.932	12	376/km^{2} (975/sq mi)	1
570	Zimatlán de Álvarez	22,093	1	353.7	136.6	1	62/km^{2} (162/sq mi)	7
	Distrito Zimatlán	58,667	—	914	352.90	—	64/km^{2} (166/sq mi)	—
Source: INEGI

=== Largest cities ===
Largest cities or towns in Zimatlán Distric Source:
Rank		Municipality	Pop.
1	Zimatlán de Álvarez	Zimatlán de Álvarez	14,226
2	San Pablo Huixtepec	San Pablo Huixtepec	9,610
3	Ayoquezco de Aldama	Ayoquezco de Aldama	4,022
4	Ciénega de Zimatlán	Ciénega de Zimatlán	2,980
5	Santa Gertrudis	Santa Gertrudis	2,547
6	Santa Catarina Quiané	Santa Catarina Quiané	2,166
7	San Bernardo Mixtepec	San Bernardo Mixtepec	1,718
8	San Antonino El Alto	San Antonino El Alto	1,450
9	Santa Cruz Mixtepec	Santa Cruz Mixtepec	1,370
10	Valdeflores	Zimatlán de Álvarez	1,278
