= San Pablo Huixtepec =

- Municipality and town
- Location in Mexico
- Coordinates: 16°49′N 96°47′W
- Country: Mexico
- State: Oaxaca

Population (2015)
  - Total: 19,750
- Time zone: UTC-6 (Central Standard Time)

San Pablo Huixtepec is a town and municipality in Oaxaca in south-western Mexico. The municipality covers an area of 17.86 km^{2}. It is part of the Zimatlán District in the west of the Valles Centrales Region.

As of 2010, the municipality had a total population of 17,530.
