= Santa Catarina Quiané =

- Municipality and town
- Location in Mexico
- Coordinates: 16°53′N 96°44′W
- Country: Mexico
- State: Oaxaca
- Time zone: UTC-6 (Central Standard Time)

Santa Catarina Quiané is a town and municipality in Oaxaca in south-western Mexico. The municipality covers an area of km^{2}. It is part of the Zimatlán District in the west of the Valles Centrales Region.

As of 2005, the municipality had a total population of .
