= Santa Gertrudis, Oaxaca =

Santa Gertrudis
- Location within Mexico
- Coordinates: 16°47′N 96°48′W
- Country: Mexico
- State: Oaxaca
- District: Zimatlán
- Municipality: Municipality of Santa Gertrudis, Oaxaca
- Time zone: UTC-6 (Central (US Central))
- Postal code: 71280

Santa Gertrudis is a town, and the seat of municipality of the same name, located in the region of the Valleys in the Mexican state of Oaxaca. It is approximately 41 km from the capital city of Oaxaca.

== Geography ==
=== Climate ===
Its climate is temperate, with prevailing winds from the north.

== Cuisine ==
Regional cuisine consists of mole accompanied with white rice, beef stew, pork liver with scrambled egg (for breakfast)and typical drinks as chocolate, chocolate atole, tejate, and mescal.

== The municipality ==
As municipal seat, Santa Gertrudis has governing jurisdiction over the following communities: Barrio del Panteón, La Barda Paso de Piedras, La Esmeralda, and Tercera Sección (Santa Gertrudis).
