= Magdalena Mixtepec =

- Municipality and town
- Location in Mexico
- Coordinates: 16°54′N 96°54′W
- Country: Mexico
- State: Oaxaca

Area
  - Total: 11.48 km^{2} (4.43 sq mi)

Population (2005)
  - Total: 1,101
- Time zone: UTC-6 (Central Standard Time)

Magdalena Mixtepec is a town and municipality in Oaxaca in south-western Mexico. The municipality covers an area of 11.48 km^{2}. It is part of the Zimatlán District in the west of the Valles Centrales Region.

A civil congregation existed in the town around the turn of the 16th and 17th centuries. The town was previously known as Magdalena Tepex Zimatlán, but was renamed as the parish of Santa Cruz de Mixtepec.

== Demography ==
As of 2005, the municipality had a total population of 1,101. There are a handful of the near-extinct Asunción Mixtepec Zapotec language speakers remaining in the town.
