= Mixtepec Mixtec =

Mixtec language spoken in Mexico

- (San Juan Mixtepec)
- Sà’án Sàvǐ ñà ñuù Xnúvíkó
- Native to: Mexico
- Region: Oaxaca
- Native speakers: (9,200 in Mexico cited 2000)
- Language family: Oto-Manguean: Mixtecan; Mixtec; Mixtepec Mixtec

Language codes
- ISO 639-3: mix
- Glottolog: mixt1425
- ELP: Mixtepec Mixtec

Mixtepec Mixtec is a Mixtec language that is spoken in the lower Mixteca region. Mixtec language is largely spoken in the area of San Juan Mixtepec, district of Juxtlahuaca, state of Oaxaca. However, the language is also spoken in other areas including Tlaxiaco, San Quintín Baja California, Santa María California, and Oregon. In 2004, it was reported that approximately 12,000 people spoke the Mixtepec Mixtec language. While most speakers of the language refer to it as saꞌan ntavi meaning 'language of the poor' or 'poor people's language,' others refer to it as 'sa'an save' which means 'rain language.' It is not closely related to other varieties of Mixtec.

== Phonology ==
The Mixtepec Mixtec tone system features three distinct tones: high, mid (which is considered to be unmarked), and low. Since mid tones are not marked in the IPA, just the vowel is used with no tonal diacritics. The tone system also features two bi-level contour tones: rising, falling; and two tri-level tones: falling-rising, rising-falling. In the IPA transcriptions there is no difference made between high and rising tones and low and falling tones because these are phonologically non-contrastive. However, the specific difference between low/high and falling/rising is marked in the IPA transcription. While tone in Mixtepec Mixtec is used to mark lexical distinctions, it can also be used to express morpho-syntactic, morpho-semantic, and adverbial functions. In certain phonetic and lexical context lexical tones, phonological tone may be realized over multiple phonetic units, including non-vowels. More specifically, this can be seen occurring with glides and nasals. A common term for the structure of Mixtec roots is, 'couplet,' since Mixtec roots contain exactly two vowels. The root shape in Mixtepec Mixtec is:

(1) (C)(C)V(C)V

=== The Mixtecan consonantal inventory ===
*Taken from, 'A phonological Sketch of the Yucunany Dialect of Mixtepec Mixtec'*

(The symbols encased within the parentheses are phonemes that are used very little in the language or, they only occur in loanwords.)

In Mixtepec Mixtec, consonants are restricted to onsets. Consonant clusters may occur word-initially or word-medially but not root-medially.

*Taken from, 'A Phonological Sketch of the Yucunany Dialect of Mixtepec Mixtec'*

=== Vowel Phonemes ===
The vowel phonemes of Mixtepec Mixtec includes a canonical five-vowel system with widely dispersed vowels.

*Taken from, 'A Phonological Sketch of the Yucunany Dialect of Mixtepec Mixtec'*

Each of these vowels in the Mixtepec Mixtec language has a nasalized counterpart. The vowel length is not phonologically contrastive even though the vowels' duration varies contextually. While the vowels /i/, /u/, /o/, and /a/ are used on a regular basis throughout the language, the /e/ vowel is used rarely and occurs only in a handful of words. Each of these vowels has a nasalized counterpart.

=== Tone Patterns ===
The Mixtepec Mixtec language has monomorphemic couplets that exhibit a maximum of three tones (high, mid, and low). Some examples of common tone patterns include:

*Taken from, 'A Phonological Sketch of the Yucunany Dialect of Mixtepec Mixtec'*

All five vowels found in the Mixtepec Mixtec language have nasalized differentiating counterparts however, the mid vowels /õ/ and /ε􏰀/ are rare. The language may have words that are spelled similarly but, they can be distinguished by the use of nasalization in the way the words are pronounced. Below are some examples of words that are spelled similarly but are differentiated by accents that distinguish tone and nasalization.

*Taken from, 'A Phonological Sketch of the Yucunany Dialect of Mixtepec Mixtec'*

== Orthography ==
=== The Alphabet of the Mixtecan Languages ===
A, CH, D, E, G, I, Ɨ, J, K, L, M, N, Nd, Ng, Ñ, O, P, R, S, T, Ts, U, V, X, Y

=== Vowels ===
a, e, i, ɨ, o, u	an, en, in, on, un	aa, ee, ii, oo, uu	aꞌa, eꞌe, iꞌi, oꞌo, uꞌu
a: auna (heart)	an: xiꞌan (hawk)	aa: saa (bird)	aꞌa: yaꞌa (chile)
e: sketa (running)	en: teen (sweat)	ee: skee (harvesting)	eꞌe: veꞌe (house)
i: ita (flower)	in: ntikuain (squirrel)	ii: chikuii (water)	iꞌi: tsiꞌi (mushroom)
ɨ: kɨni (pig)	on: sachoonn (working)	oo: koo (snake)	oꞌo: nchoꞌo (hummingbird)
o: oko (twenty)	un: xuꞌun (money)	uu: kañuu (quail)	uꞌu: yuꞌu (mouth)
u: uli (slingshot)			

=== Consonants ===
Kk: kiti (horse)	Ll: lakuku (lovebird)	Mm: maꞌa (raccoon)	Nn: nuni (corn)
Ññ: ñunu (red)	Rr: skuleru (teacher)	Ss: savi (rain)	Tt: tikaka (crow)
Vv: vitsi (pineapple)	Xx: xio (skirt)	Yy: yakui (armadillo)	ꞌ: toꞌlo (rooster)

=== Composed Consonants ===
Ch/ch: chaka (fish)	Nch/nch: nchichi (green bean)	Nk/nk: nkuii (fox. fe)	Nt/nt: ntixi (corn cob)
Nts/nts: ntsitsi (wing)	Ts/ts: tsatu (pants)	Xch/xch: xchacha (corn hairs)	

=== Special Letters ===
The letters d, f, g, j, p, and rr are only used when they are taken or borrowed from Spanish.

Dd: soldadu (soldier)	Ff: café (coffee)	Gg: amigu (friend)
Jj: juevixi (Thursday)	Pp: paa (bread)	RR/rr: lurru (donkey)

== Morphology ==
One of the language characteristics found in Mixtec Mixtepec is cliticization, that is identified as <ꞌ> in orthography. It is a feature in syntax and morphology that has syntactically features of a word yet, it is phonologically dependent another (like a bound morpheme).

=== Cliticization ===
Mixtepec Mixtec English

'Siki soꞌo' 'Earrings'

'Kuaꞌan' 'Go'

'Kuis nchuaꞌati tutu' 'The animal is carrying a lot of wood'

'Kuanꞌan skuela kutuꞌu nuu skuleru' 'Go to school to learn from a teacher'

=== Morphological Description ===
When a verb starts with /t/, /ts/, /k/, or /sk/, the past tense aspect is nì-, although it may vary because the completive aspect is not as marked but still sustains the L tone prefix.

==== Prefixes ====
Mixtec Mixtepec English

(Present Participle)

káꞌà yù 'I am talking'

kíkuù 'I am sewing'

(Past Tense)

nìkà à yù 'I talked'

nìkìkuù 'I sewed'

When a verb starts with /k/ as shown in the example above, it is expressed as present participle, while the prefix nì- is the past tense of /k/.

Mixtepec Mixtec English

(Present Participle)

Tíiì 'I am holding'

Tzíꞌiì 'I am drinking'

(Past Tense)

Ndìiì 'I held'

Ndzìꞌiì 'I drank'

When the verb begins with /t/ it is expressed in present participle, however the past tense prefix are n(d)i- and n(dz)ì- .

==== Suffixes ====
(First person singular suffixes)

Mixtepec Mixtec English Mixtepec Mixtec English

nàmá 'soap' nàmáà 'my soapꞌ

tìinà ncháá 'blue dog' tìinà nchááà 'my blue dogꞌ

sòkò 'shoulder' sòkò yù 'my shoulderꞌ

veꞌe ncháꞌì 'black house' veꞌe ncháꞌì yù 'my black houseꞌ

The suffix in first person singular are marked in the form -yù when they are final L tone, therefore when it is not unmarked it shown to have a repetitive vowel with accent above the vowel <à, ì, ù>.

(Third person singular)

Mixtepec Mixtec English Mixtepec Mixtec English

sàmá 'clothing' sàmíì 'his clothing

vàáꞌa 'bad' vàáꞌì 'it is badꞌ

sìꞌi 'leg' sìꞌaà 'his legꞌ

kachìí 'cotton' kachìáà 'she is dyingꞌ

The suffix in a pronoun that ends with à become -ì when it is third person singular, and for /i/ it is suffixed with -à.

== Bibliography ==
- Paster, Mary and Beam De Azcona, Rosemary, 2004. A phonological sketch of the Yucunany dialect of Mixtepec Mixtec. In Proceedings of the 7th Annual Workshop on American Indian Languages, Carmen Jany (ed.) (pp. 61–76).
- Paster, Mary and Beam de Azcona, Rosemary, 2004. Aspects of tone in the Yucunany dialect of Mixtepec Mixtec. In Conference on Otomanguean and Oaxacan Languages, University of California, Berkeley.
- Pike, Eunice V. and Ibach, Thomas, 1978. The phonology of the Mixtepec dialect of Mixtec. Linguistic and literary studies in honor of Archibald A. Hill, 2, pp. 271–285.
- mixtepecmixteccorpusandlexicography/files/mixtepec-mixtec-working-vocabulary
