= San Pedro Mixtepec =

San Pedro Mixtepec may refer to

- San Pedro Mixtepec, Juquila, a municipality in Juquila District of Oaxaca
- San Pedro Mixtepec, Miahuatlán, a municipality in the Miahuatlán District of Oaxaca
