= St Gertrude Old Church, Riga =

St. Gertrude Old Church
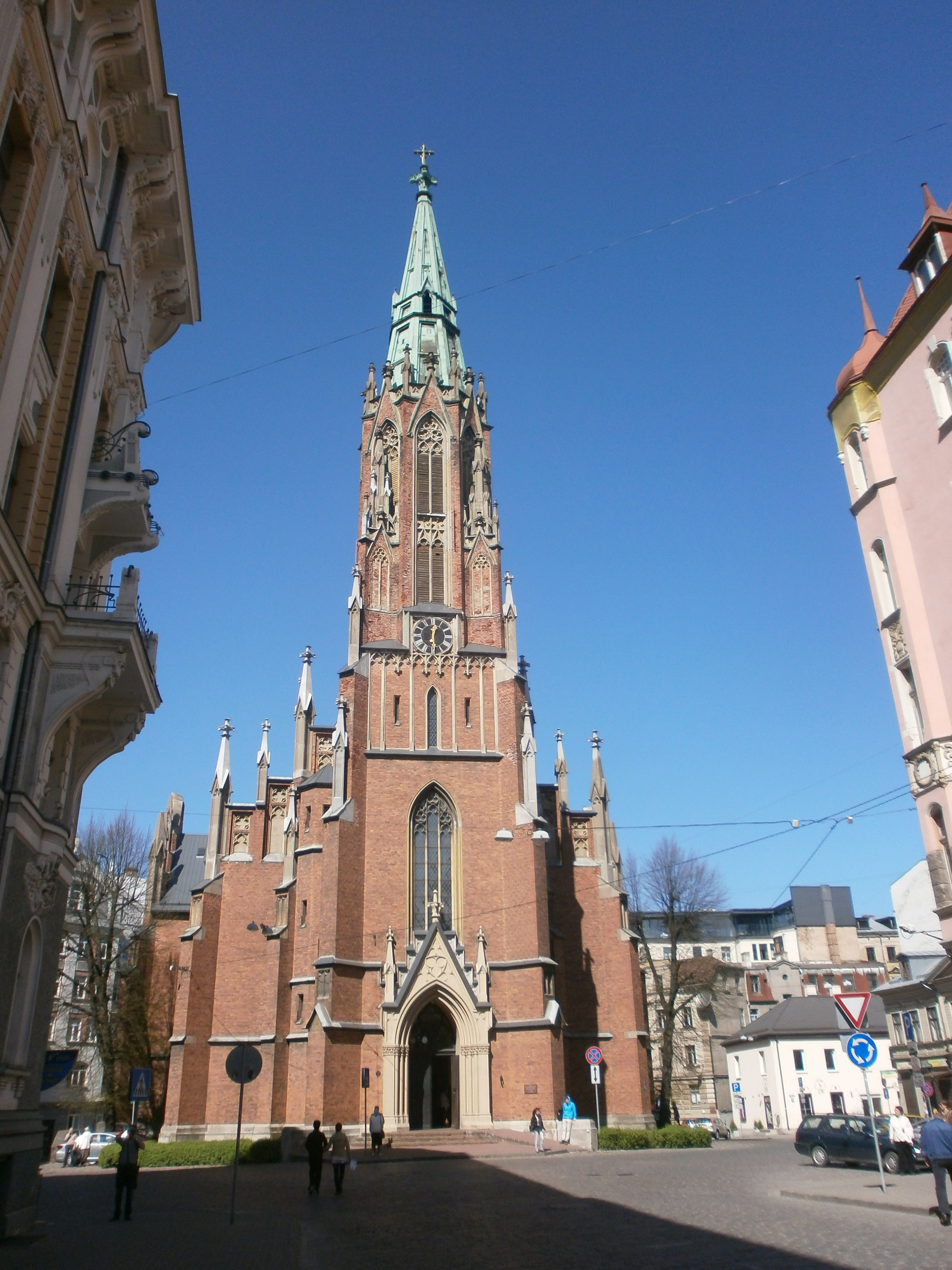

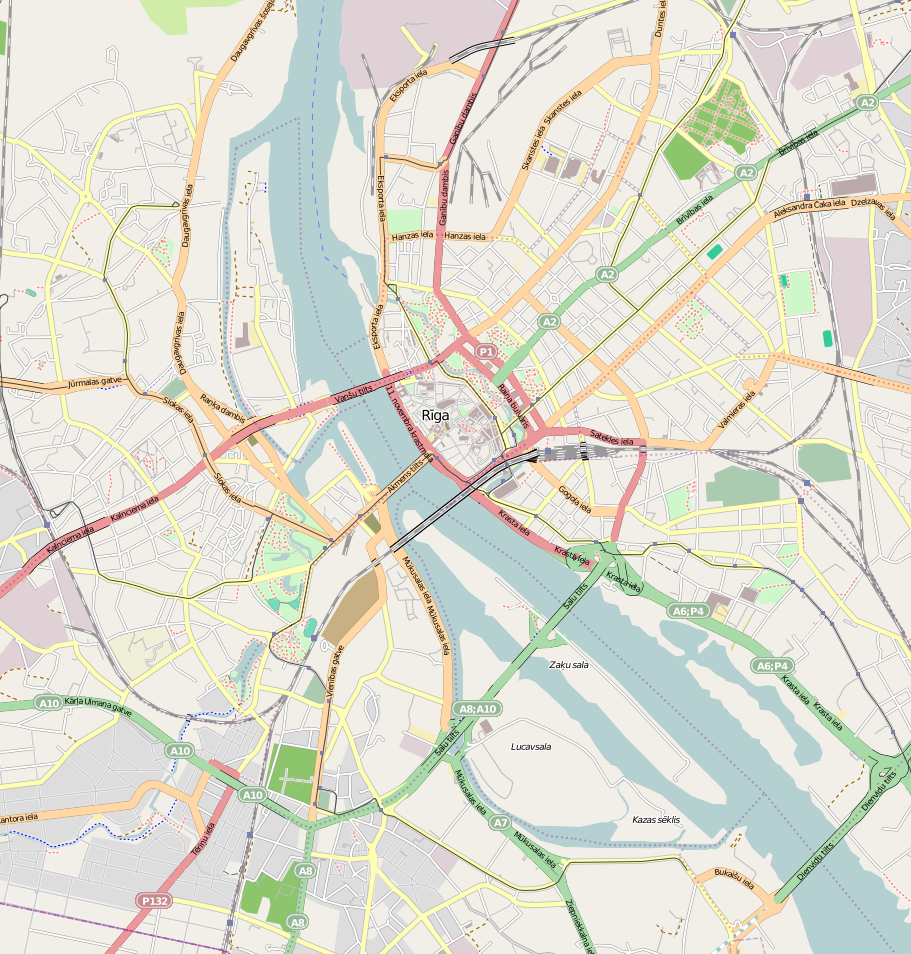
- Location within Riga
- 56°57′28.72″N 24°7′17.98″E
- Location: Riga
- Country: Latvia
- Denomination: Lutheran

History
- Consecrated: March 2, 1869

St Gertrude Old Church (Latvian: Vecā Svētās Ģertrūdes evaņģēliski luteriskā baznīca) is a Lutheran church in Riga, the capital of Latvia. It is a parish church of the Evangelical Lutheran Church of Latvia. The church is situated at the address 8 Ģertrūdes Street. It has a long association with Riga's German ethnic community, and the congregation worship in the German language.

Seven St. Gertrude’s churches have stood on or near the present location. The church is located in a suburb of Riga, historically outside the main city walls, and thus were unprotected in times of war or siege.

== History ==
The exact year of the first church's construction is unknown, but it was first mentioned in chronicles at the beginning of the 15th century (existing by 1418), when it was located outside the Riga city wall, in the suburb. It was named after Saint Gertrude (626–659), the Catholic patroness of travelers. It was built of stone and later demolished

In 1522, when the Riga City Council, supported by the guilds, appointed Andreas Knopken as a Lutheran preacher at St. Peter’s Church and Sylvester Tegetmeier as pastor of St. James's Cathedral, the so-called “iconoclast riots” began in Riga—Lutheran mobs stormed and vandalized churches, including St. Gertrude's, which was destroyed.

In 1589, it was decided to rebuild the church and hand it over to the Lutheran congregation (Catholicism had been outlawed, and the previous congregation members had either been expelled, fled the city, or converted). The work was completed in 1591, and the following year, the road to the church was paved, as it had been impassable in rainy weather.

During the Polish-Swedish War in 1605, as Charles IX’s army laid siege to Riga, Swedish commander Count Mansfeld burned down the church. In 1656, during the siege of Riga siege by Tsar Alexei I’s army, the church building itself remained unharmed, but the bells and organ were looted and taken to Russia. Since services couldn’t be held there, the congregation temporarily relocated.

In 1700, the Great Northern War began, and the church was again destroyed. In 1743, the Riga City Council allocated funds to St. Gertrude’s congregation for rebuilding, and in 1744 the church was rebuilt, in wood. From 1753 to 1754, the church was completely rebuilt again in order to enlarge it and received a tower. In 1753, the tower was topped with a sphere, and two bells were commissioned from Riga bell founder Indriķis Birmans. Riga sculptor Kurlavskis created a tabernacle and gilded crucifix for the altar, and deaf organ builder J. Joachims from Jelgava made the organ, with the case designed by Riga carpenter master K. G. Apelbaum. In 1755, master miller Jānis Lichtverks donated a tower clock made by clockmaker Vihmans.

Further expansion led to rebuilding in 1778, the congregation decided to build a new church at the beginning of present-day Brīvības Street, and a shift of location back to the exact site of the original stone church. Application was made to build in stone, but was refused by the city council (stone structures were permitted only inside the city walls), so another wooden church was built. The cornerstone was laid on April 8, 1779, and it was consecrated on August 29, 1781.

=== 19th century ===
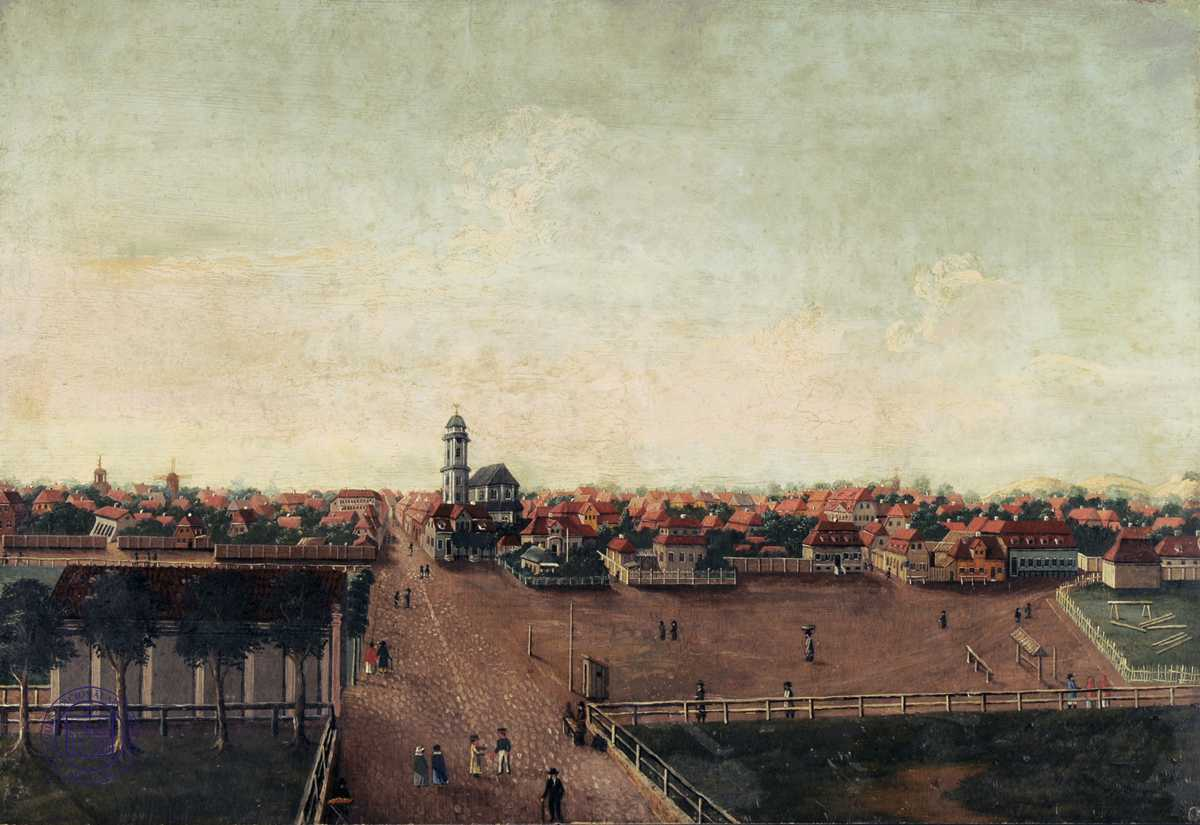
The wooden church visible in the center, in 1812

During the French invasion of Russia as part of Siege of Riga in 1812, on the orders of military governor Magnus Gustav von Essen, all Riga suburbs were burned down—including St. Gertrude’s Church which was consecrated in 1781. In 1812, the congregation built a prayer house at the corner of present-day Brīvības and Dzirnavu Streets, which was consecrated on May 24, 1817. The organist was August Lebrecht Bretschneider (1771–1840), former music professor at the Jelgava Academic Gymnasium.

Finally from 1866 to 1869 the present stone and brick church was constructed to replace the wooden building. In the mid-19th century, after the demolition of Riga’s fortifications, it was decided to replace the wooden structure with a stone church. As the suburbs were rebuilt, a location was reserved at the intersection of Kalēju (now Ģertrūdes) and Baznīcas Streets. The current church design was made by architect Johann Felsko (1813–1902), and master mason Krīgers undertook the construction. Work began in 1864. Foundation reinforcement was a major challenge, with depths reaching 6.5 meters in some places. Construction was completed in 1866, and on August 10, the cross was placed on the tower. The church was consecrated on March 2, 1869.

=== 20th century ===
Historically, the St. Gertrude congregation was a Baltic German one (in 1938, the German congregation had 4,800 members), but in the 1920s, the authorities required that it also accommodate two Latvian congregations. However, until 1939, the church’s administrative and financial matters were still managed by the German administration. Up to 200 people attended summer services, and up to 460 in winter. About 170 members attended Bible classes. A newspaper called St. Gertrud-Bote was regularly published, and the monthly Ev.-luth. Kirchenblatt was available to all German congregations in Latvia. In 1934, the church’s heating system underwent major renovation.

In 1948, three congregations—the so-called Academic (led by pastor M. Gaumigs), Resurrection (pastor O. Gerliņš), and Christ Church (pastor K. Vārpa)—were merged to form the new Old St. Gertrude congregation, as the German members had left Riga. June 22, 1948, is considered the official founding date of the new Old St. Gertrude congregation, when it was registered by the Commissioner for Religious Affairs of the Council of Ministers of the Latvian SSR, P. Pizāns.

In 1959, the northern side of the church roof was reconstructed, wartime brickwork covering the lower windows was removed, and three stained-glass windows were restored. A choir of 35 people was active. During the Soviet era, the authorities made various efforts to restrict or even destroy the congregation—denying pastors registration, repeatedly raising insurance fees for the church, etc., which pushed the congregation to the brink of collapse. By the mid-1950s, membership had dropped to around 300; by the mid-1970s, to 200. After Latvia regained independence, the Old St. Gertrude Church saw a significant increase in congregation members.

== Architecture ==
The church is a typical example of eclecticism in refined Neo-Gothic forms, a three-aisled pseudo-basilica with a short transept. Its exterior features a pronounced vertical emphasis, highlighted by numerous decorative turrets adorning the stepped gables, buttresses, and the base of the spire. The church tower gradually narrows in volume, reaching a height of 63 meters, and its spire is covered with copper sheeting. The outer walls are finished with red bricks and architectonic elements cast in concrete.

In 1912, the church’s altarpiece was replaced with a crucifix. On either side of the altar are sculptures of St. Peter and St. John. The stained-glass windows were made in the second half of the 19th century and in 1907 at the E. Todé workshop. The largest bell (0.97 m in diameter) was cast in bronze in 1867 by V. T. Donat and J. C. Schwenn. However, in 1915, it was evacuated to Russia and only brought back in 1923.

The pipe organ (1867–1876, III/P/31) was originally built by August Martin (1808–1892) of Dachwig, and was moved to the New St. Gertrude Church in 1906.

The current church organ was built in 1906 by the firm of W. Sauer in Frankfurt an der Oder and is considered one of the best and most melodic in Riga.

== Second St Gertrude's church ==
By the start of the twentieth century St Gertrude's recorded more than 30,000 church members, meeting as three distinct congregations. A German congregation and a Latvian congregation alternated their services between Sunday morning and Sunday afternoons, and a second Latvian congregation worshipped on Sunday evenings. From 1903 to 1906 a second church was built, now known as St Gertrude New Church, and this became the centre of the Latvian congregations, leaving Old St Gertrude's as the German-speaking church for Riga.

== Gallery ==
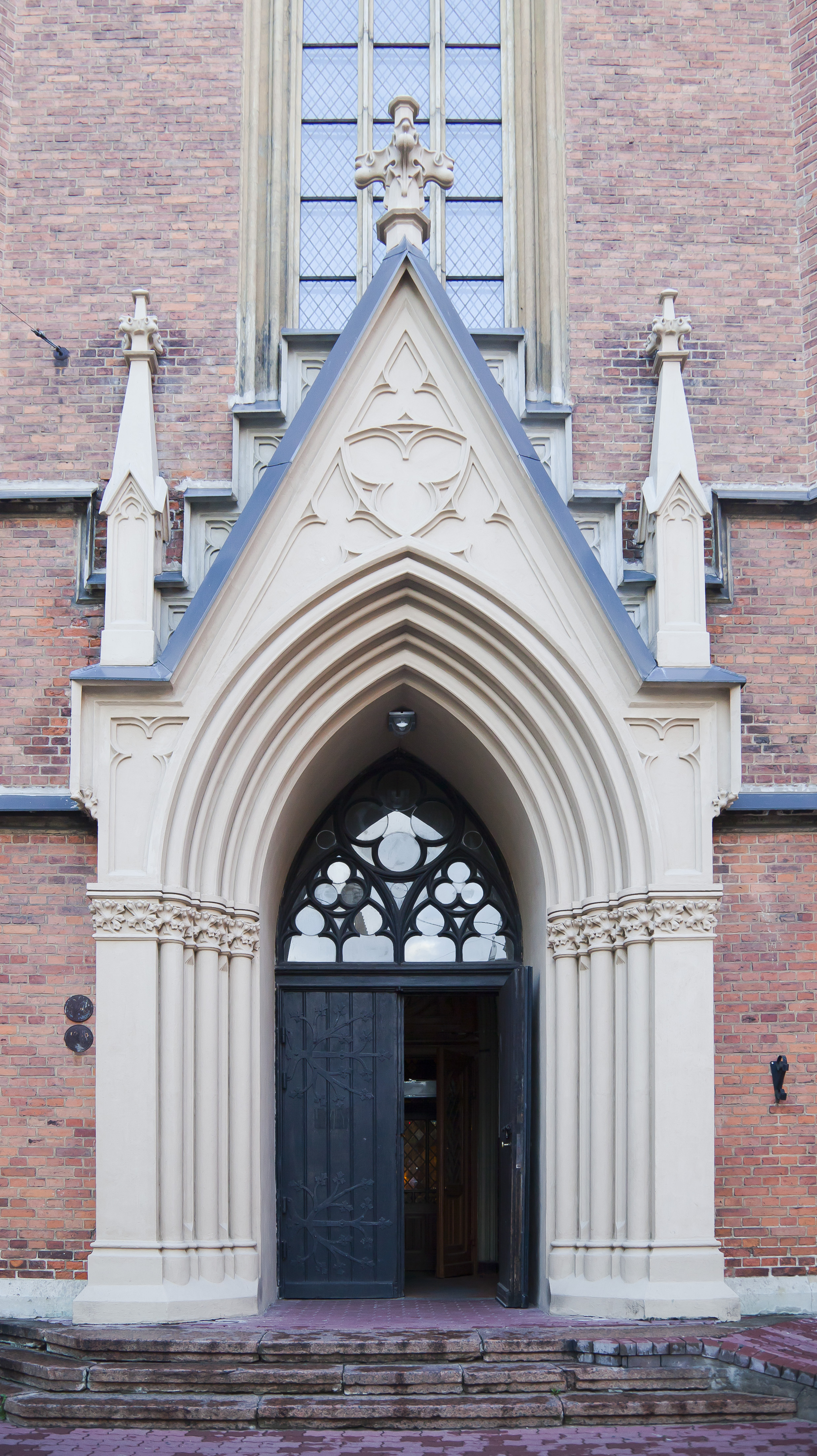
Exterior detail

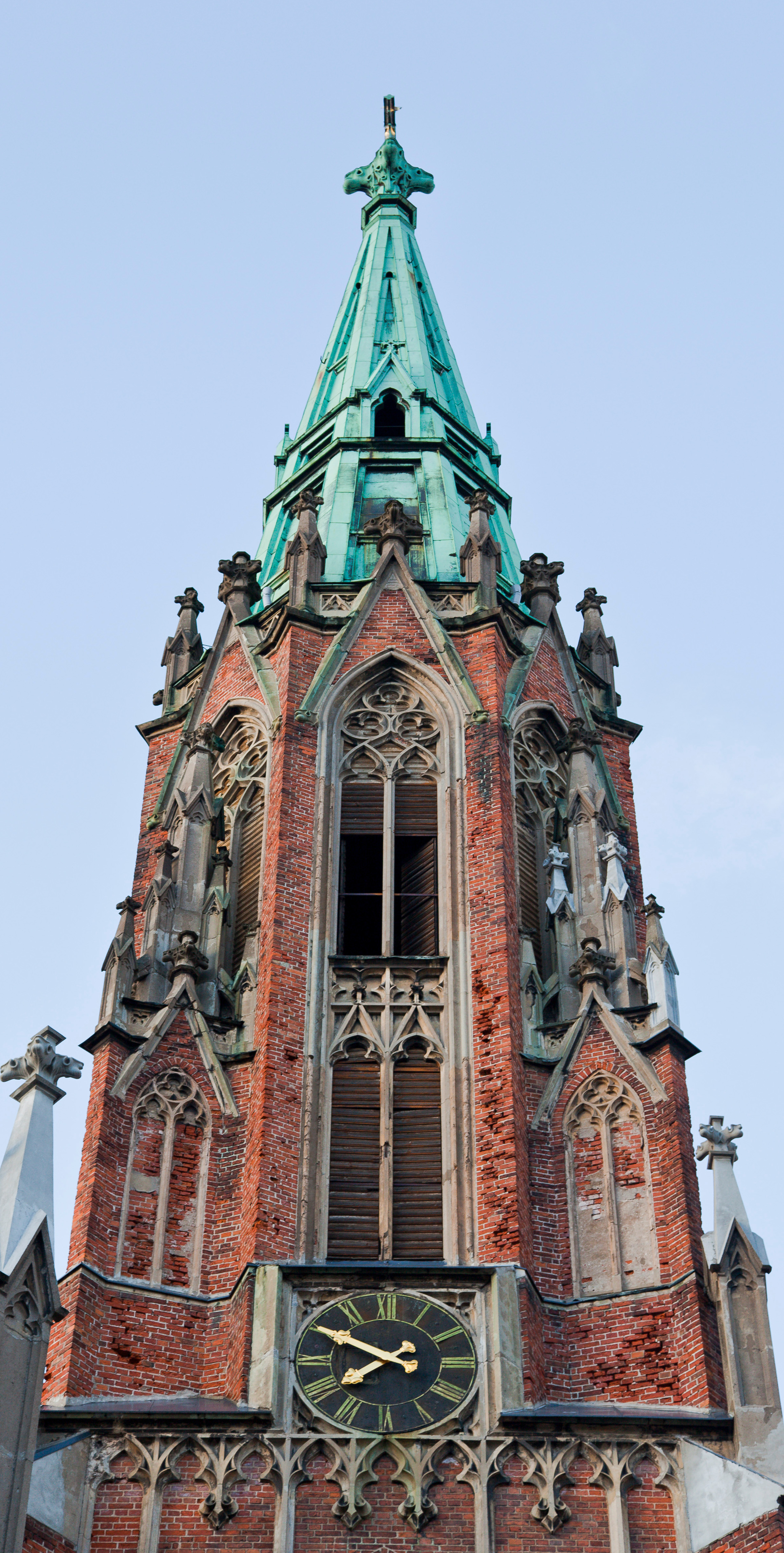
Tower detail

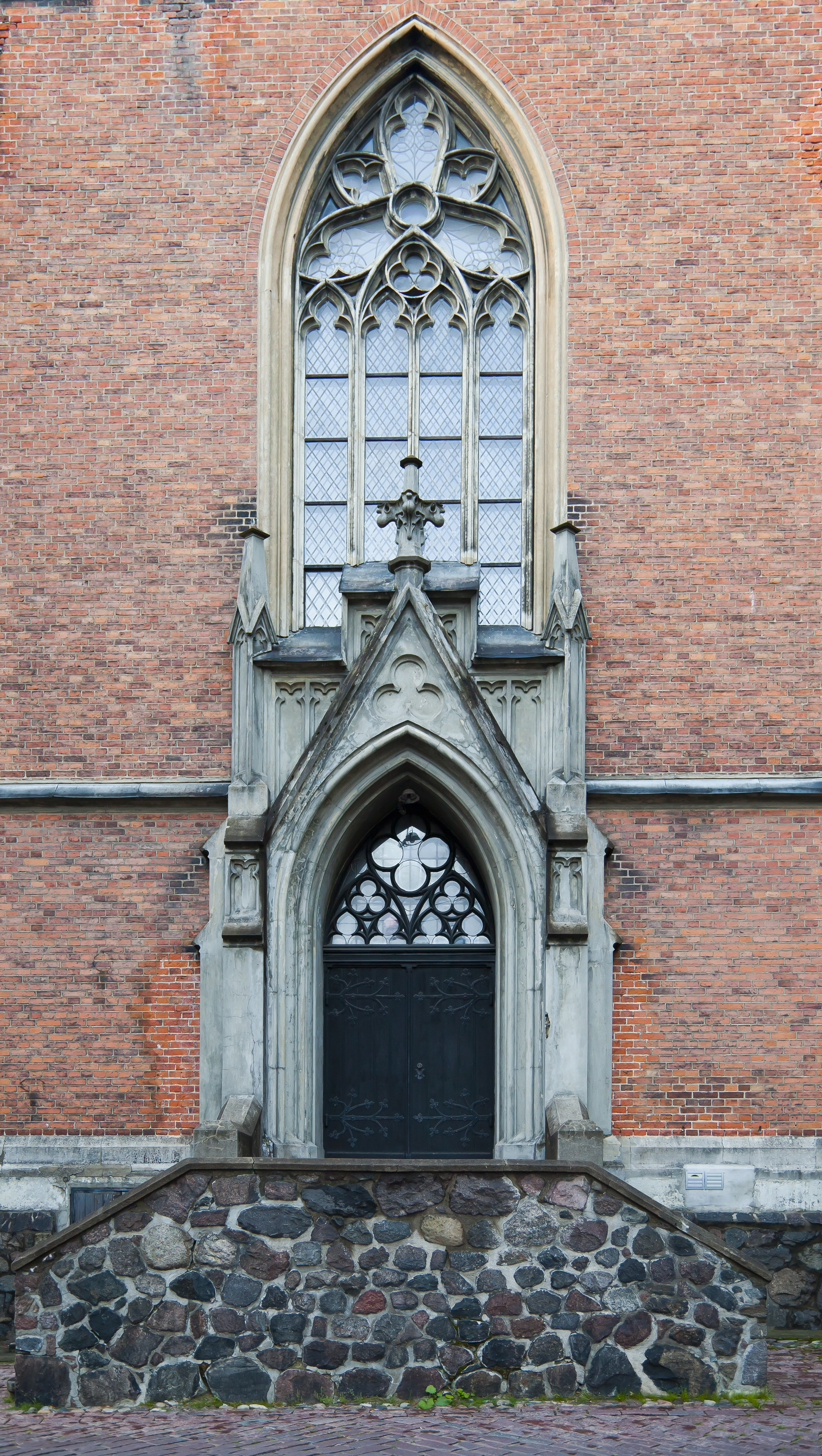
Exterior detail

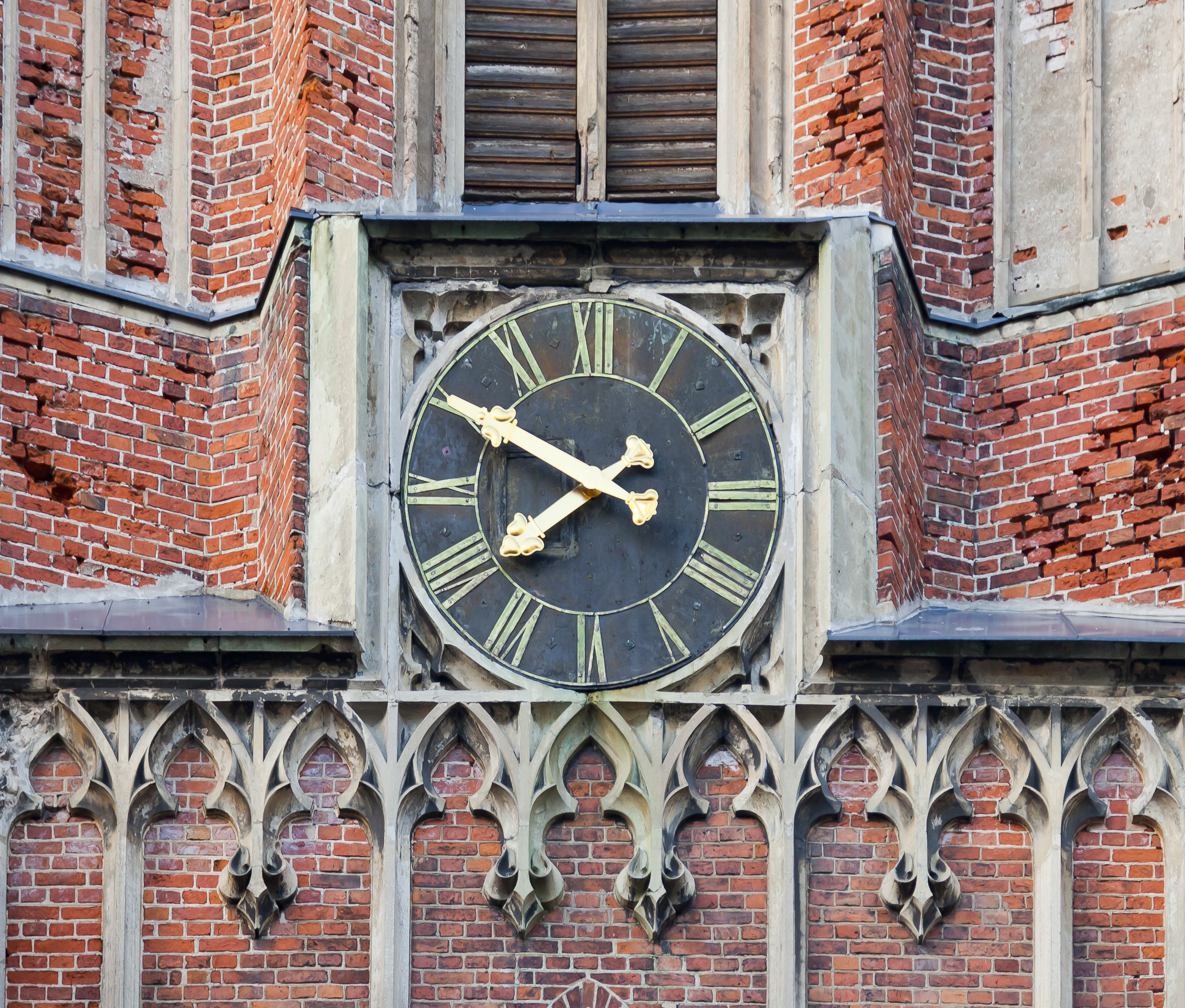
Exterior detail
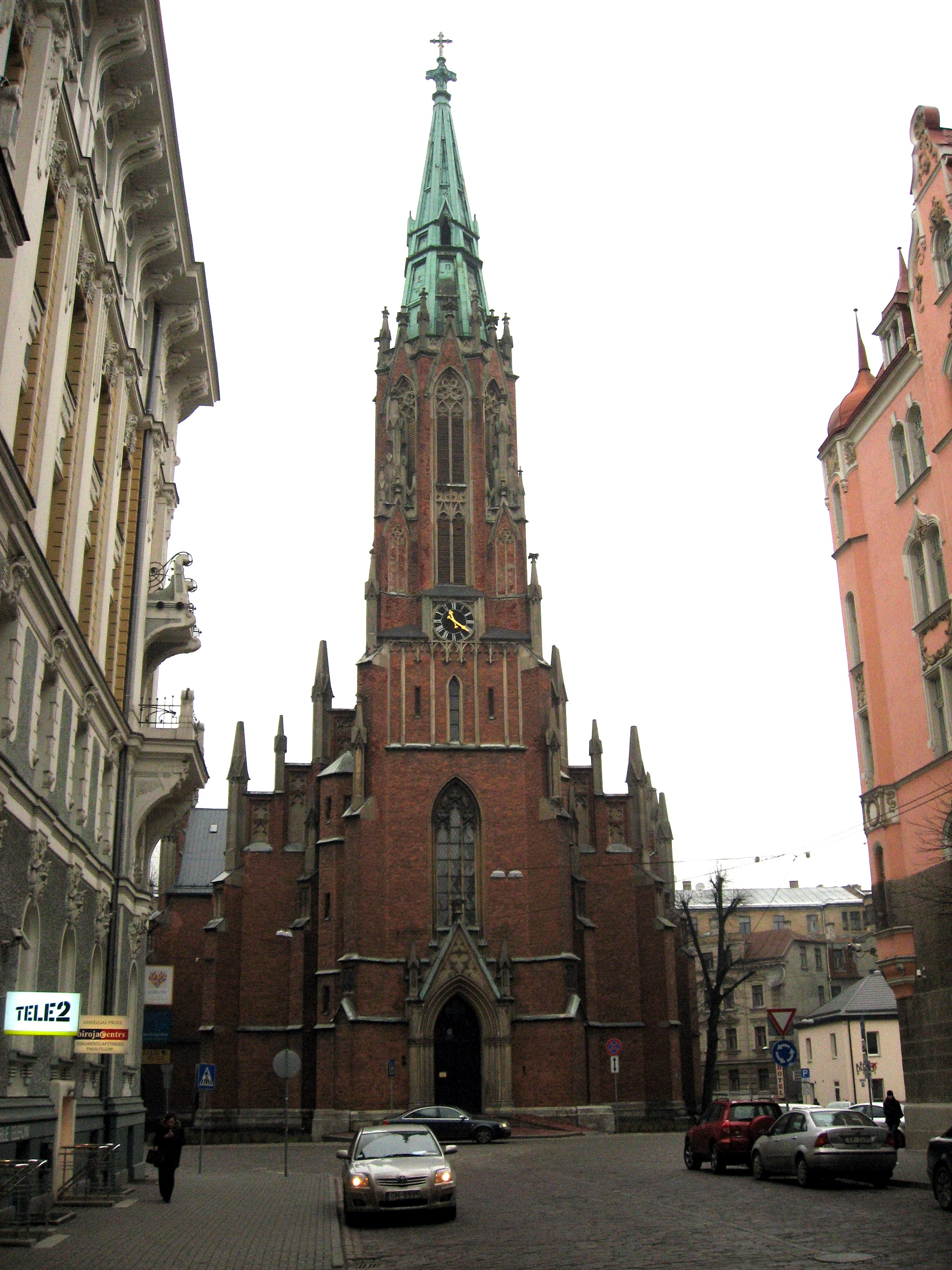
View from the street

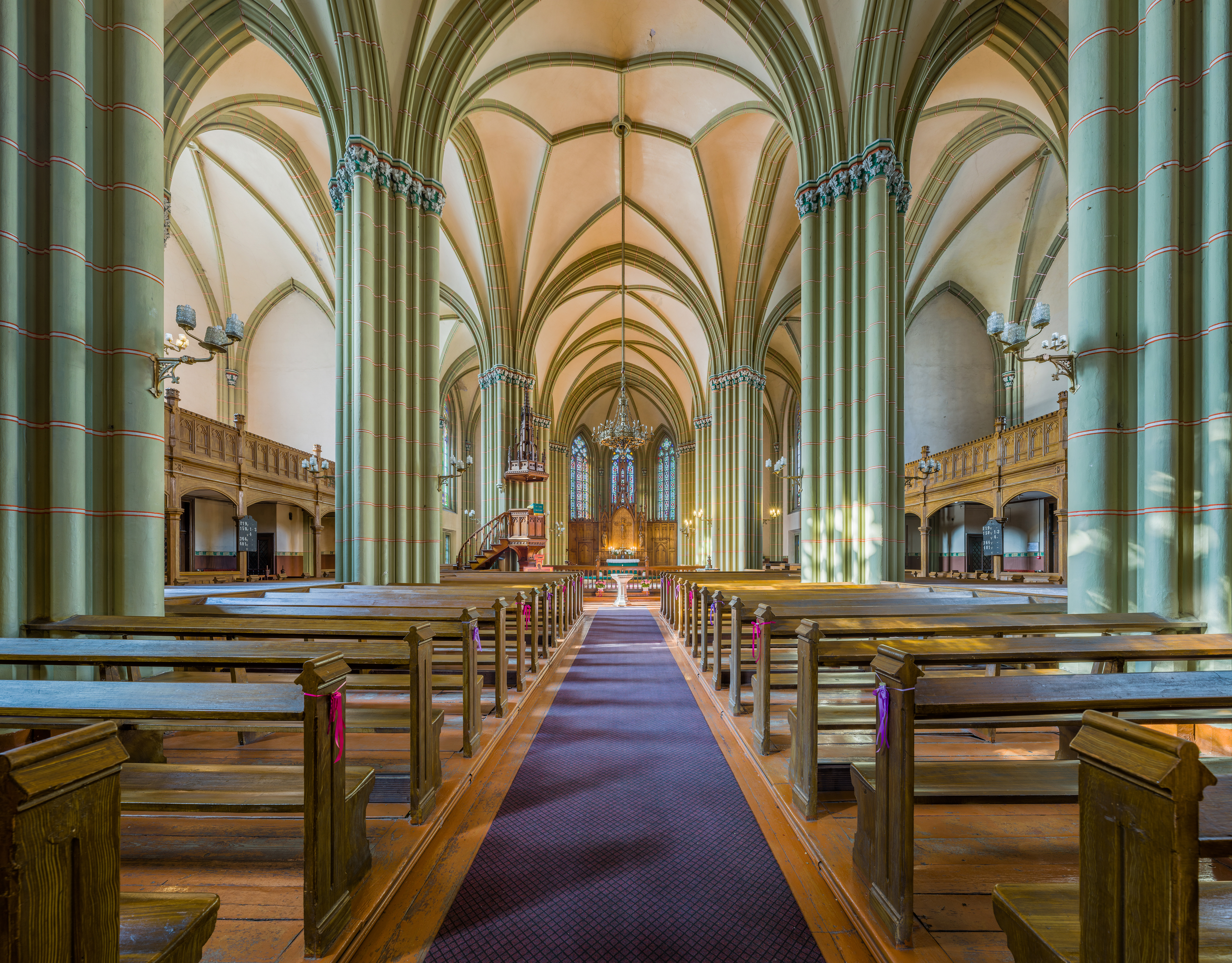
Interior looking west

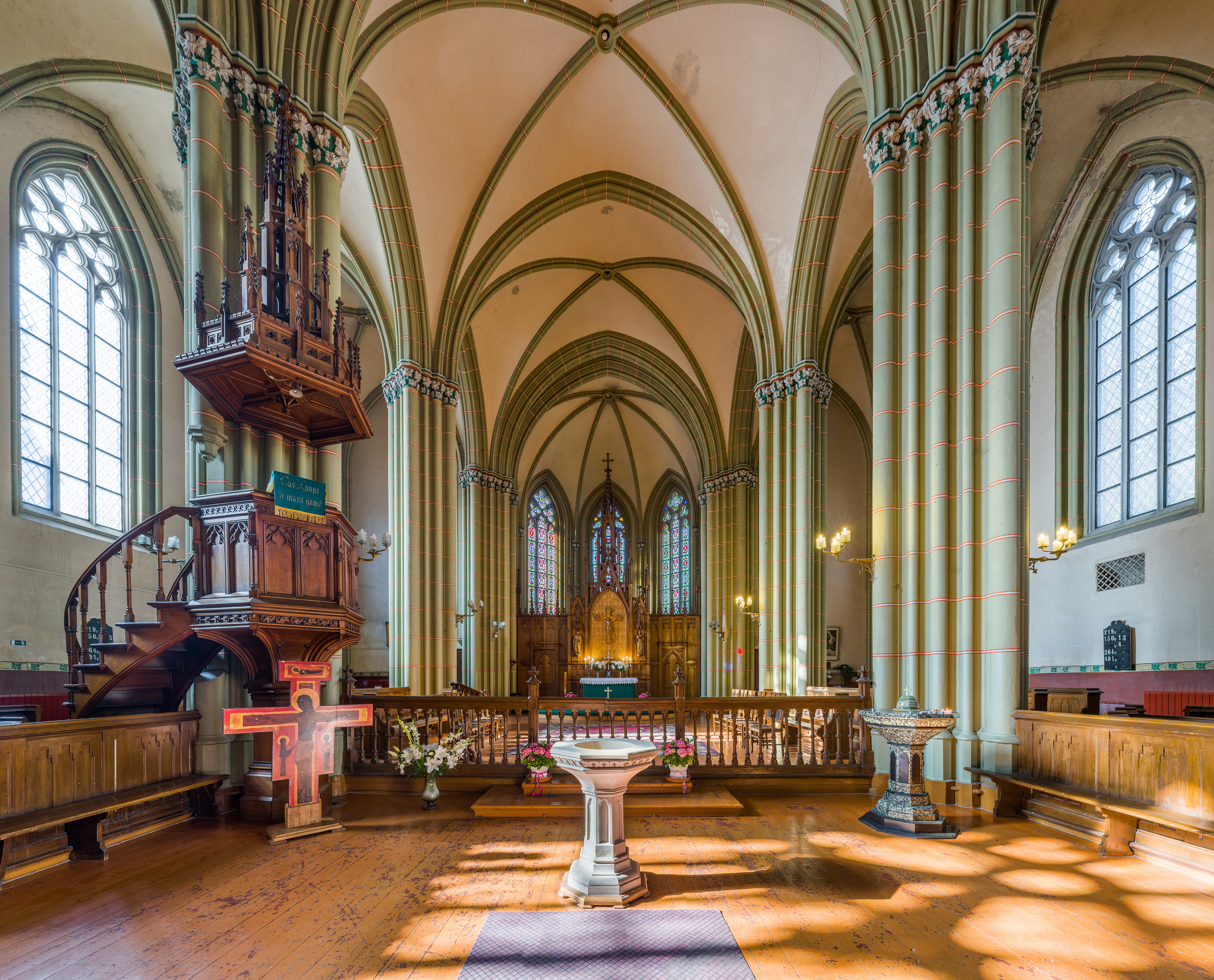
The pulpit and sanctuary

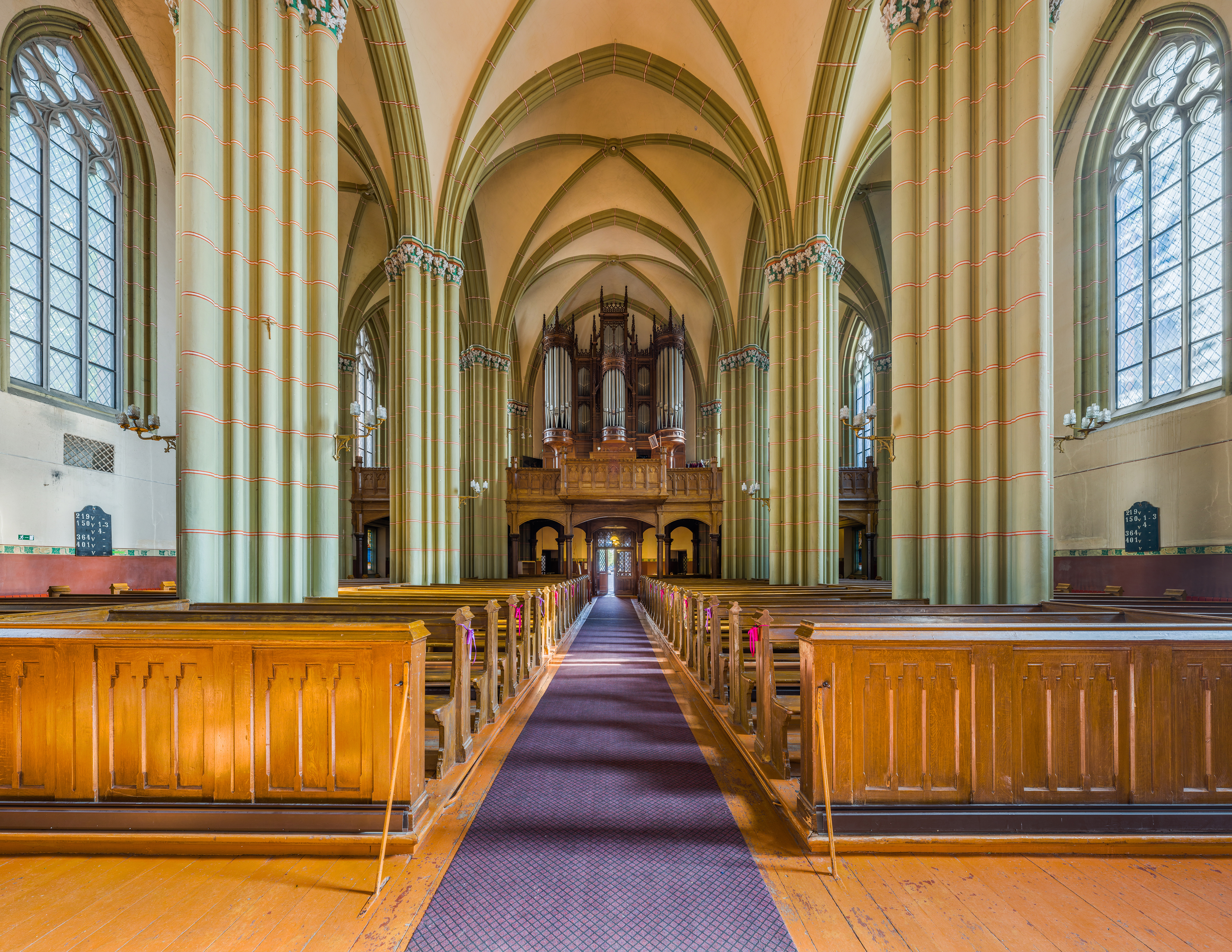
Interior looking east

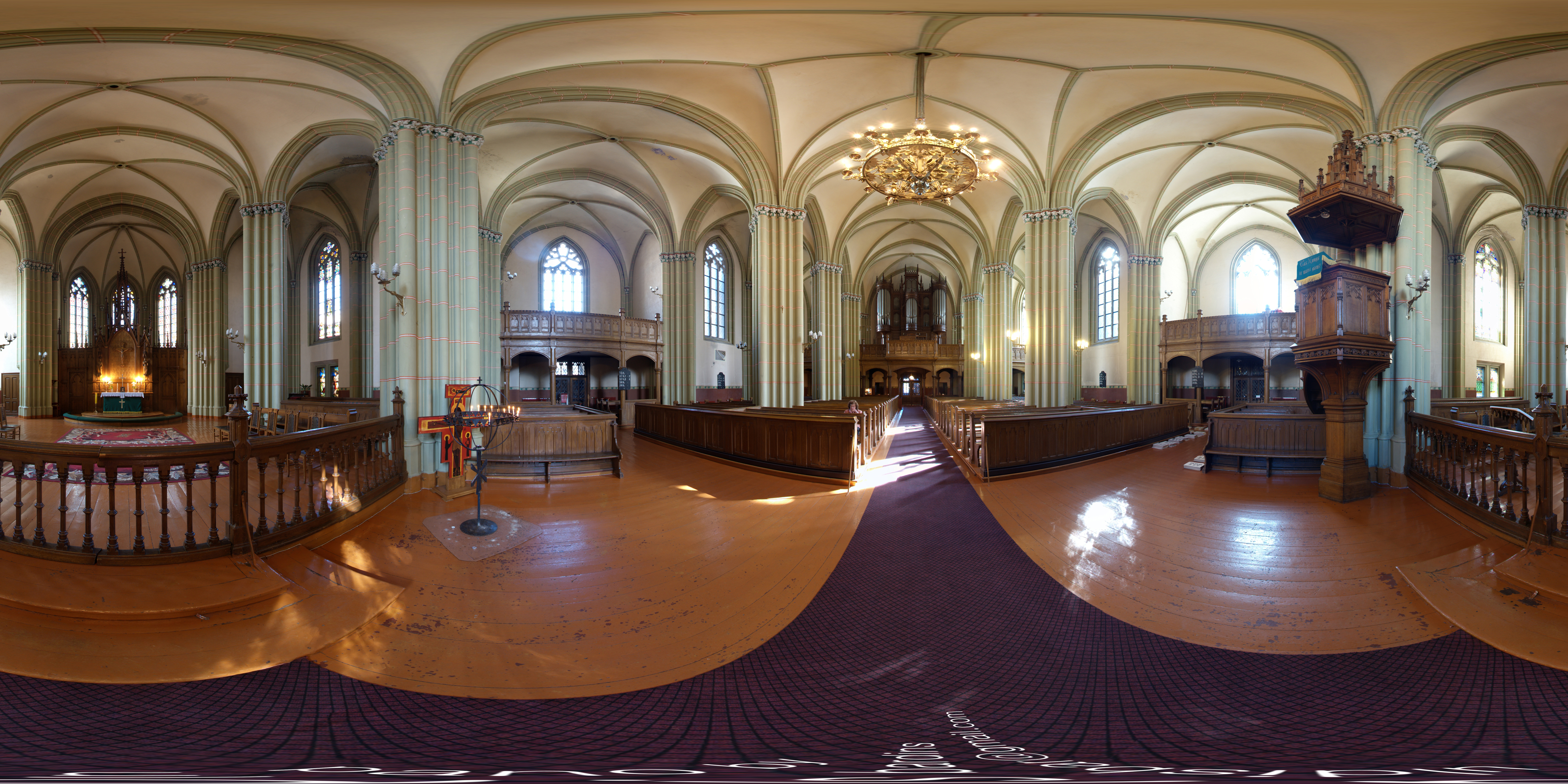
Interior, pano360
