= Santa Cruz Mixtepec =

- Municipality and town
- Location in Mexico
- Coordinates: 16°48′N 96°52′W
- Country: Mexico
- State: Oaxaca
- Time zone: UTC-6 (Central Standard Time)

Santa Cruz Mixtepec is a town and municipality in Oaxaca in south-western Mexico. The town covers an area of 66.34 km^{2}. It is part of the Zimatlán District in the west of the Valles Centrales Region.

In 2005, the municipality had a population of 2,984.

The church is notable for a number of colonial-era santos or statues of the saints, many of them executed in fine polychrome that has been well preserved.

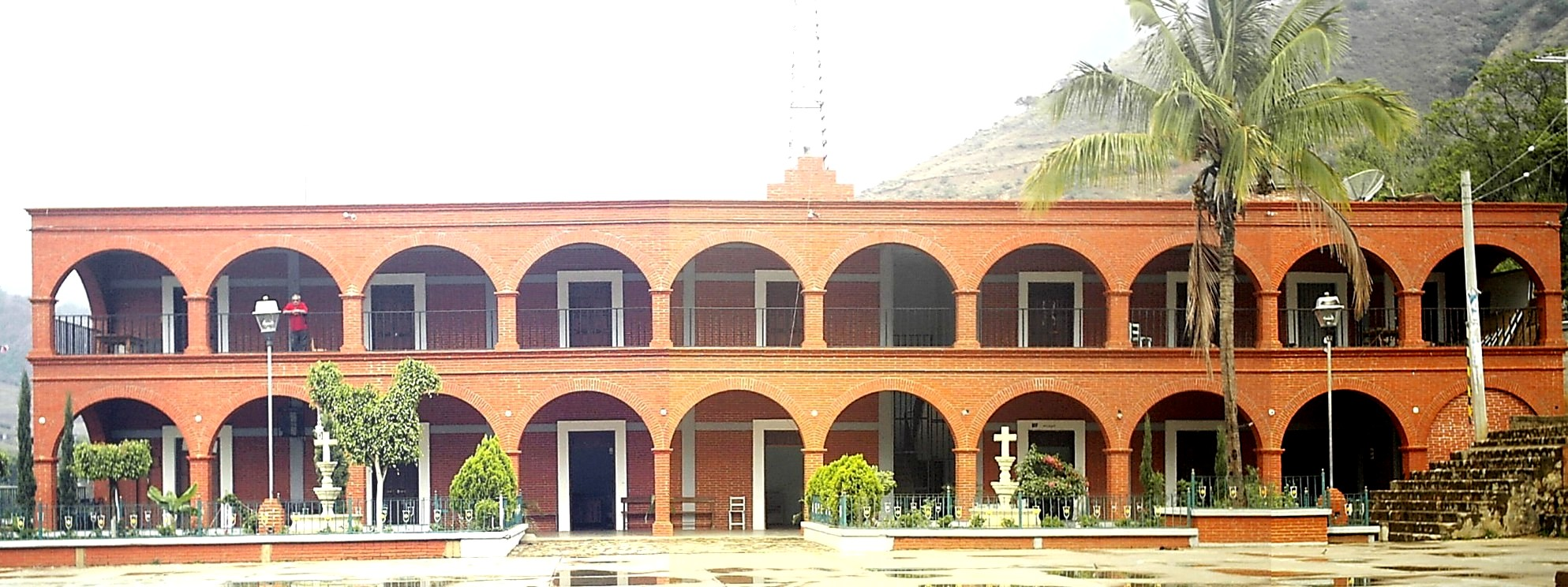
Palacio Municipal de Santa Cruz Mixtepec
