= San Bernardo Mixtepec =

- Municipality and town
- Location in Mexico
- Coordinates: 16°49′N 96°54′W
- Country: Mexico
- State: Oaxaca

Area
  - Total: 67.62 km^{2} (26.11 sq mi)

Population (2005)
  - Total: 2,727
- Time zone: UTC-6 (Central Standard Time)

San Bernardo Mixtepec (also San Bernardo and Mixtepec) is a town and municipality in Oaxaca, Mexico. It is part of the Zimatlán District in the west of the Valles Centrales Region.
