= St Gertrude New Church, Riga =

St Gertrude New Church
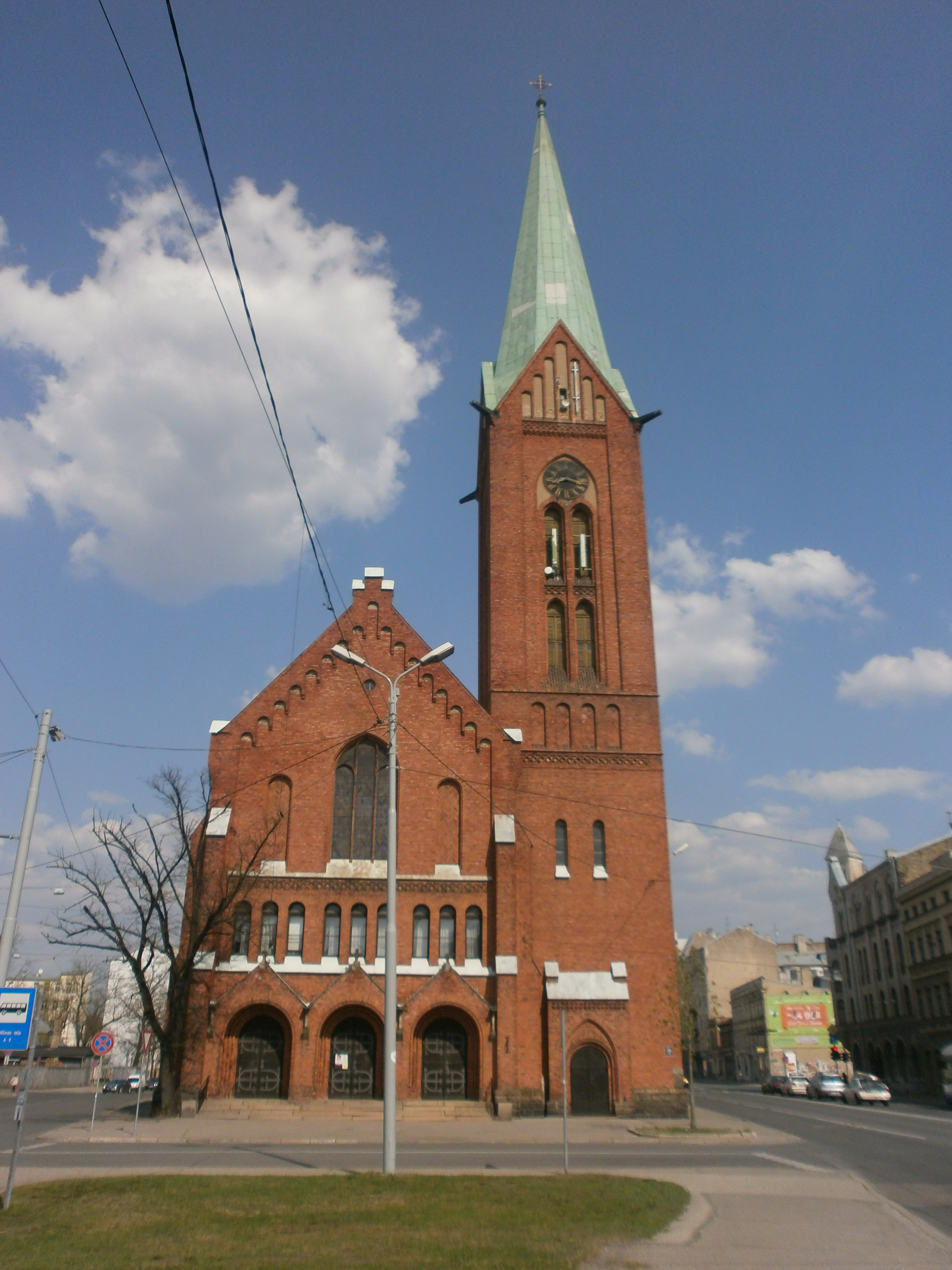

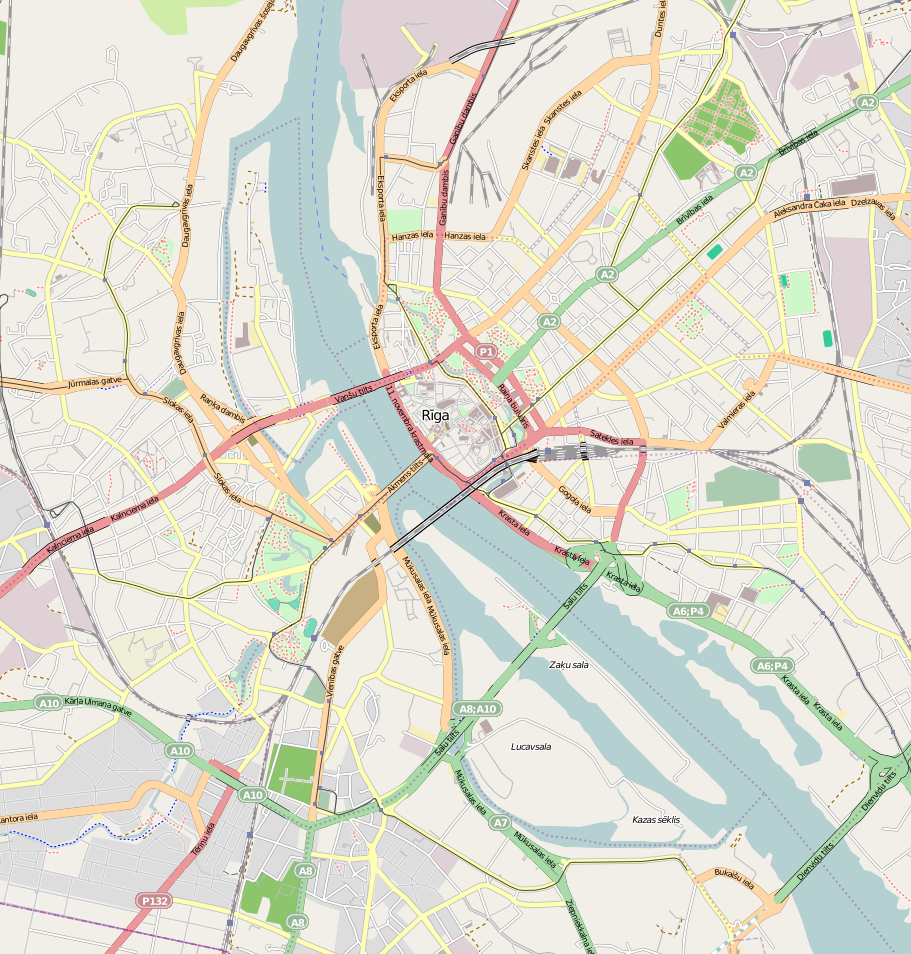
- Location within Riga
- 56°57′46.92″N 24°8′11.35″E
- Location: Riga
- Country: Latvia
- Denomination: Lutheran

Architecture
- Groundbreaking: 1903
- Completed: 1906

St Gertrude New Church (Latvian: Jaunā Svētās Ģertrūdes evaņģēliski luteriskā baznīca) is a Lutheran church in Riga, the capital of Latvia. It is a parish church of the Evangelical Lutheran Church of Latvia. The church is situated at the address 119 Brīvības Street.

== The two churches ==
St Gertrude Old Church is the ancient parish church of the district (see history at that article). However, by the start of the twentieth century Old St Gertrude's recorded more than 30,000 church members, meeting as three distinct congregations. A German congregation and a Latvian congregation alternated their services between Sunday morning and Sunday afternoons, and a second Latvian congregation worshipped on Sunday evenings. From 1903 to 1906 a second church was built, now known as St Gertrude New Church, and this became the centre of the Latvian congregations, leaving Old St Gertrude's as the German-speaking church for Riga.

The pipe organ built between 1867–1876, III/P/31 in the church was moved from the Old St Gertrude Church in 1906. It was originally constructed by August Martin (1808–1892) from Dachwig (Thuringia).
