= Zimatlán de Álvarez =

Zimatlán de Alvarez
- Municipality and town
- Location of the municipality in Oaxaca

- Location in Mexico
- Coordinates: 16°52′N 96°47′W
- Country: Mexico
- State: Oaxaca

Area
  - Total: 255.16 km^{2} (98.52 sq mi)

Population (2005)
  - Total: 18,370
- Time zone: UTC-6 (Central Standard Time)

Zimatlán de Alvarez is a town and municipality in Oaxaca in south-western Mexico. The municipality covers an area of 255.16 km^{2}. It is part of the Zimatlán District in the west of the Valles Centrales Region, and consists of four separate exclaves.

As of 2005, the municipality had a total population of 18,370.
