= Santa Gertrudis Municipality =

Coordinates: 16°47′N 96°48′W

Santa Gertrudis
- Municipality
- Interactive map of Santa Gertrudis
- Country: Mexico
- State: Oaxaca
- Municipal seat: Santa Gertrudis, Oaxaca
- Time zone: UTC-6 (CST)
  - Summer (DST): UTC-5 (CDT)
- Website: (in Spanish)

Santa Gertrudis is a municipality in the state of Oaxaca. Its municipal seat is also called Santa Gertrudis. Its territory encompasses 21.69 km^{2}, representing 0.02% of the total area of the state. Its approximate distance to the capital city of Oaxaca is 41 km. It is part of the Zimatlán District in the west of the Valles Centrales Region.

Its climate is temperate, with prevailing winds from the north.

According to the INEGI 2005 census, the municipality has a total of 2,661 people, with a total of 689 housing units.

Its major economic activities are industries, products and services, agriculture and livestock. Agriculture is the economic basis, with 80% of the population taking part. The breeding and sale of livestock, small business activities, bureaucratic functions occupy approximately 20% of the population. The economically active population of the town amounts to 943.

The regional cuisine consists of mole accompanied with white rice, beef stew, pork liver with scrambled egg ( for breakfast) and typical drinks as chocolate, chocolate atole, tejate, and mescal.
