= San Jacinto Chilateca =

- Village of Mexico
- Location in Mexico
- Coordinates: 16.84111111°N 96.68416667°W
- Country: Mexico
- State: Oaxaca
- Municipality: Ocotlán de Morelos

Population (2016)
  - Total: 641

San Jacinto Chilateca is a village in the municipality of Ocotlan de Morelos in the state of Oaxaca, Mexico. It has 641 inhabitants and borders the municipalities of San Martin Tilcajete and Santo Tomás Jalieza. San Jacinto Chilateca is 1,508 metres (4,948 ft) above sea level (SNM).

== Etymology ==
Chilateca means inhabitants of Chila . chila consists of : name of the place and tecatl : dweller .
