= Santa Gertrudis-Boca del Infierno Provincial Park =

Provincial park in British Columbia, Canada

- IUCN category II (national park)
- Location within Vancouver Island Location within British Columbia
- Interactive map of Santa Gertrudis-Boca del Infierno Provincial Park
- Location: Nootka Island, British Columbia, Canada
- Nearest town: Yuquot
- Coordinates: 49°36′30″N 126°37′45″W
- Area: 440 ha (1,100 acres)
- Established: 30 April 1996
- Governing body: BC Parks

Santa Gertrudis-Boca del Infierno Provincial Park, legally Santa-Boca Provincial Park, is a provincial park on Nootka Island in British Columbia, Canada. It was established on 30 April 1996 to protect and Santa Gertrudis Cove and Boca del Infierno Bay, which are located on the southeastern shore of Nootka Island.

== Etymology ==
Boca del Infierno means "Bay of Fury" or "Bay of Hell" while Santa Gertrudis Cove is from the Spanish name for Saint Gertrude.
