= San Juan Mixtepec, Mixteca =

San Juan Mixtepec
- Municipality and town
- Nickname: ñu'u
- Location of the municipality in Oaxaca

- Location in Mexico
- Coordinates: 17°18′N 97°50′W
- Country: Mexico
- State: Oaxaca

Area
  - Total: 209.24 km^{2} (80.79 sq mi)
- Elevation: 1,750 m (5,740 ft)

Population (2005)
  - Total: 7,423
- Time zone: UTC-6 (Central Standard Time)

San Juan Mixtepec (Mixtec: Ñuu Snuviko) is a town and municipality in Oaxaca in south-western Mexico. The municipality covers an area of 209.24 km^{2}, and is part of the Juxtlahuaca District of the Mixteca Region.

Its Mixtepec name, Ñuu Snuviko, translates to "place where the clouds descend."

As of 2005, the municipality had a total population of 7,423.
