= Brīvības iela =

Street in Riga, Latvia

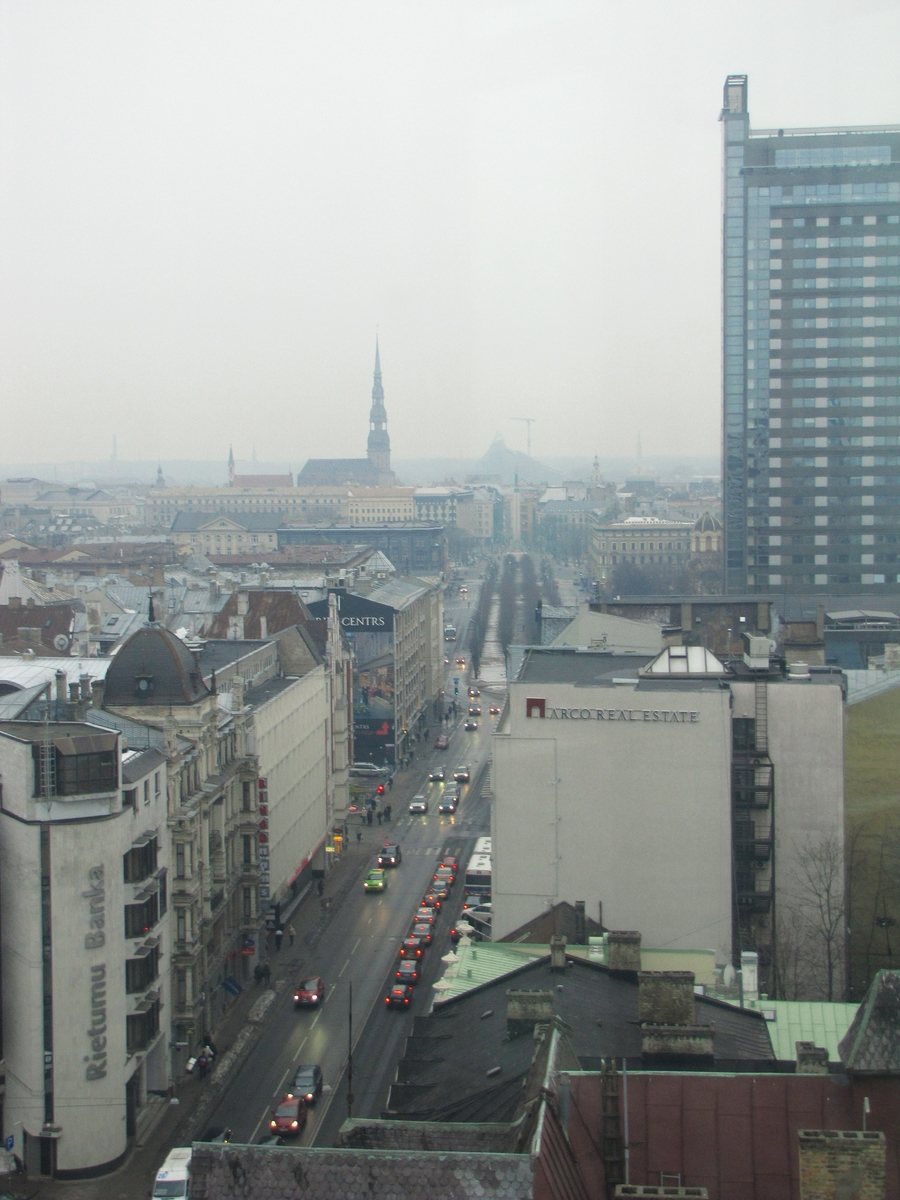
- View of Brīvības iela towards the city centre in 2011
- Interactive map of Brīvības iela
- Native name: Brīvības iela (Latvian)
- Former names: Große Sandstraße; Aleksandrovskaya ulitsa / Alexanderstraße; Brīvības gatve Adolf-Hitler-Straße; Ļeņina iela
- Length: 12 km (7.5 mi)
- Location: Riga, Latvia
- Coordinates: 56°57′05.6″N 24°06′47.6″E

Other
- Known for: Dailes Theatre; St. Gertrude New Church, Riga; St. Alexander Nevsky Church, Riga

Brīvības iela (Freedom Street) is the central street of Riga, the capital and most populous city of Latvia. It is more than 12 km long, cutting across all of Riga, from the historical centre to the outskirts and the city limits.

== Composition ==
Today, Brīvības iela is officially divided into three parts:

- Brīvības bulvāris (boulevard) is the traditional name of the part from its beginning at the Freedom Monument to Elizabetes iela (572 m);
- Brīvības iela from Elizabetes iela to the Gaisa tilts bridge (3049 m);
- Brīvības gatve from the Gaisa tilts bridge to the city border (8450 m).

The street runs through the neighborhoods of Centrs, Brasa and Grīziņkalns (on their common border), Teika, Jugla, Berģi and Bukulti (on their common border).

== History ==
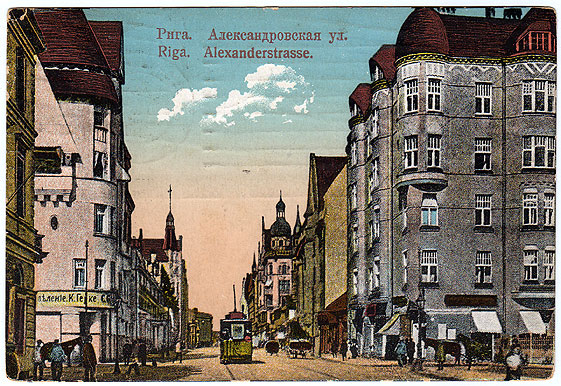
Alexanderstraße in 1912

The street was the beginning of an important trade route - the road to the region of Vidzeme (Southern Swedish Livonia) and the Russian city of Pskov. It began with what is today Smilšu iela and went through Riga's suburbs. The city entrance next to the Powder Tower was initially the main entrance to Riga from the countryside. As the city expanded, the city gates moved more towards the east and the street was extended further.

In the late 19th century and early 20th various Art Nouveau buildings were erected on what now is Brīvības iela.

Throughout its history, the street and its three main parts were known as Große Sandstraße (before 1818), Aleksandrovskaya ulitsa (Александровская улица)/Alexanderstraße (1818–1923), Brīvības gatve (1923–1942, 1944–1950), Adolf-Hitler-Straße (1942–1944) and Ļeņina iela (1950–1991).

== Notable buildings ==
=== Brīvības bulvāris ===
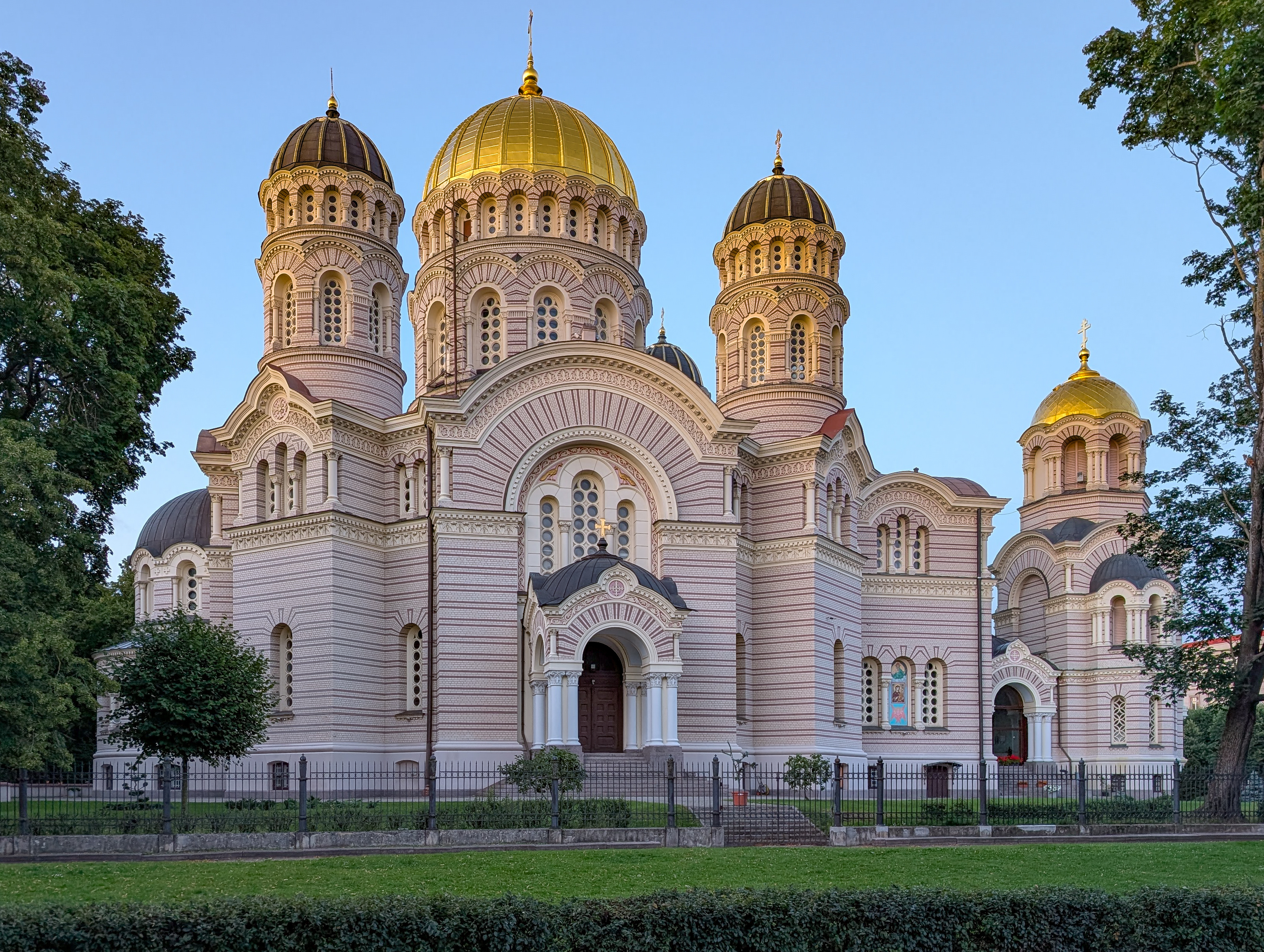
Nativity Cathedral, main Russian Orthodox cathedral of Riga

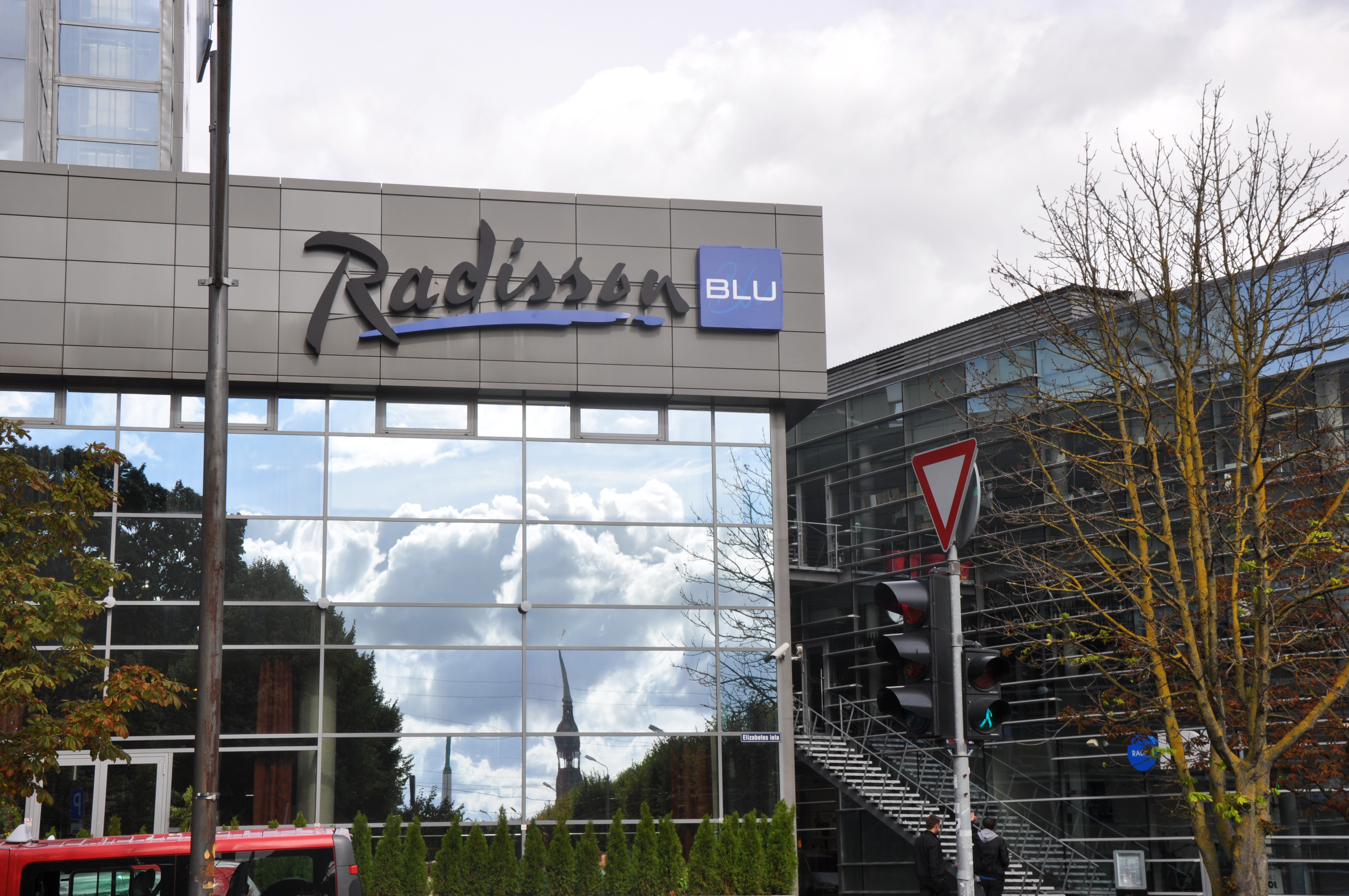
Radisson Blu Hotel Latvija, the only skyscraper of the street

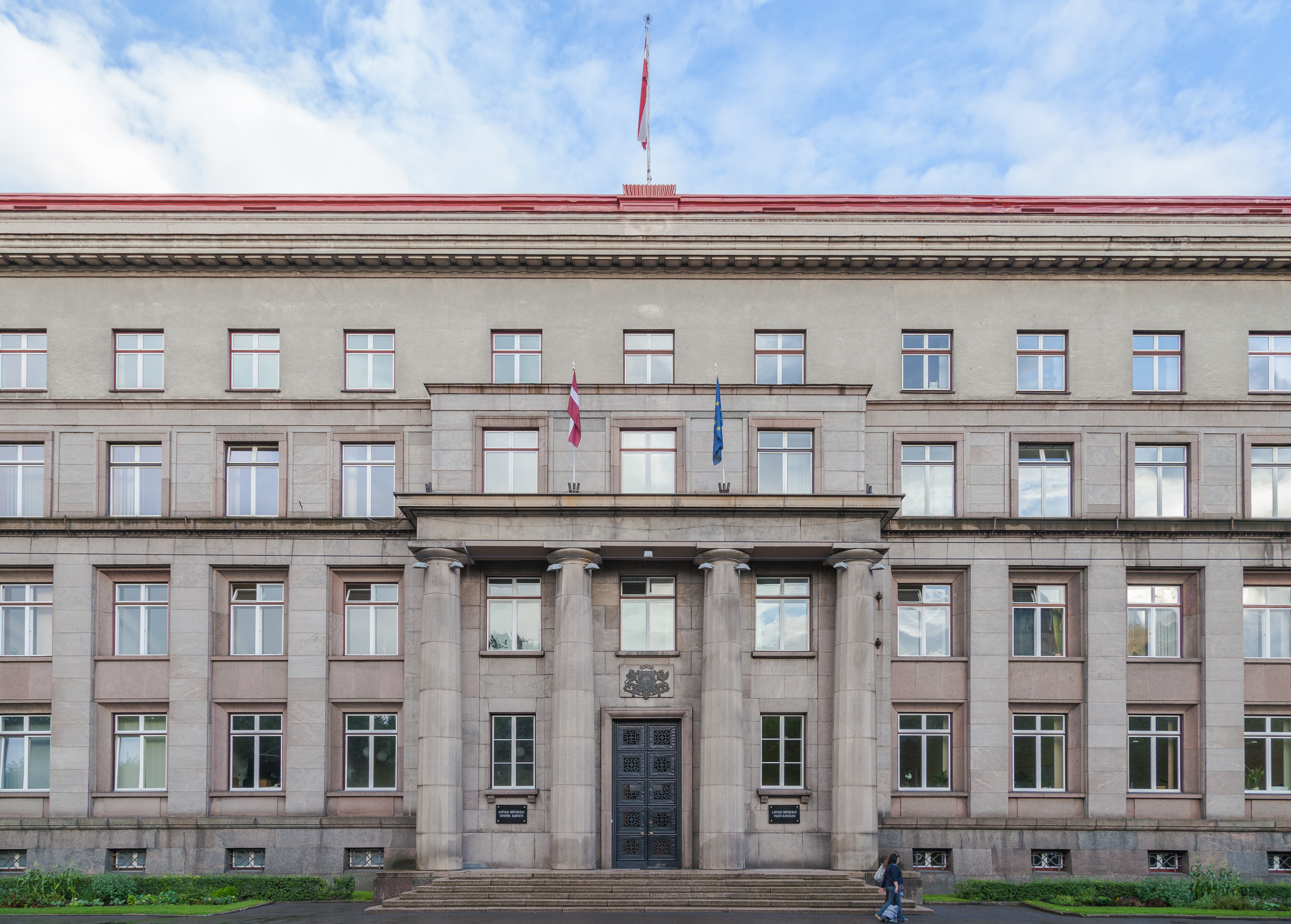
Palace of Justice, seat of the Government of Latvia and Supreme Court of Latvia

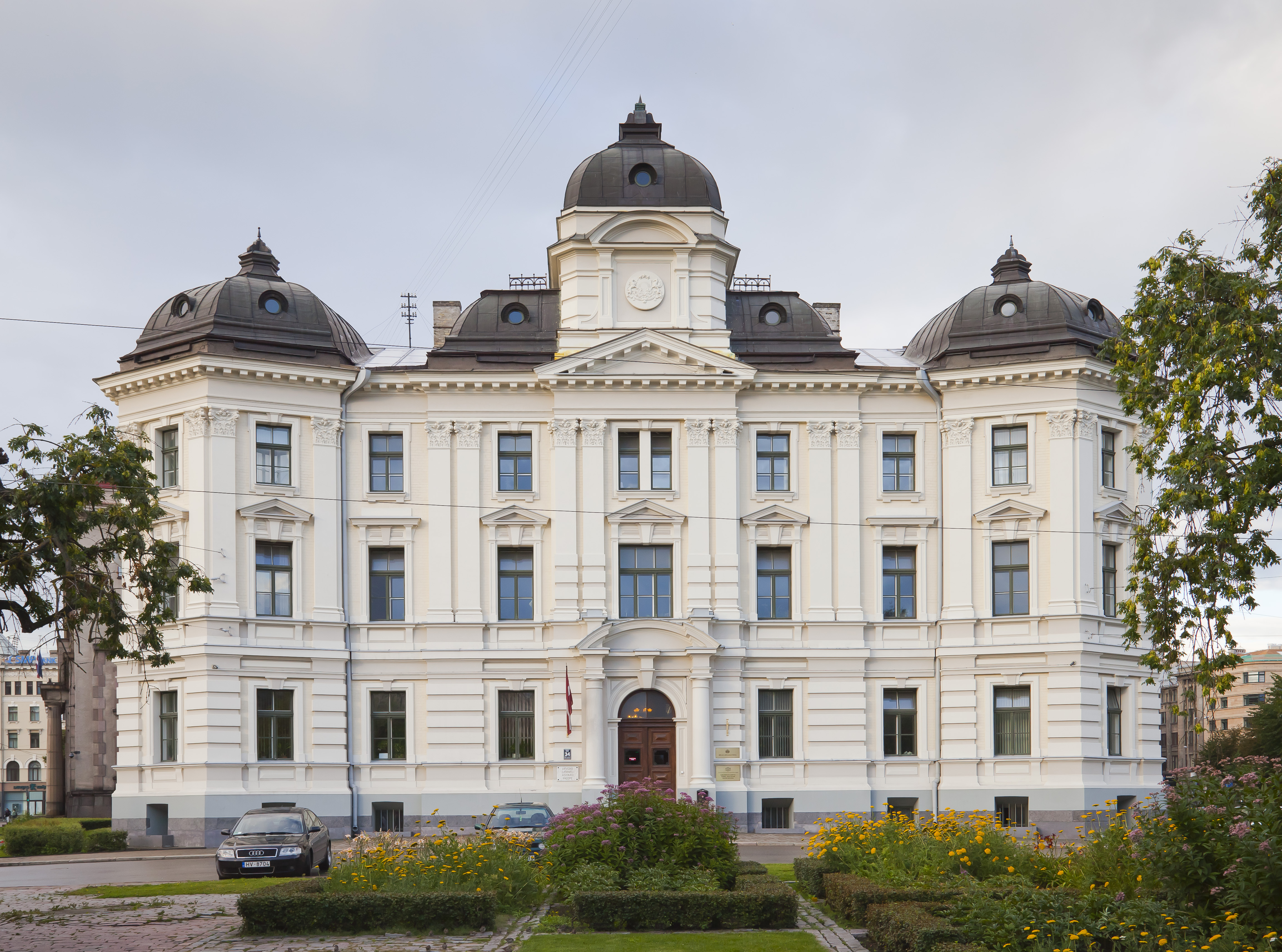
Riga Regional Court

=== Brīvības iela ===
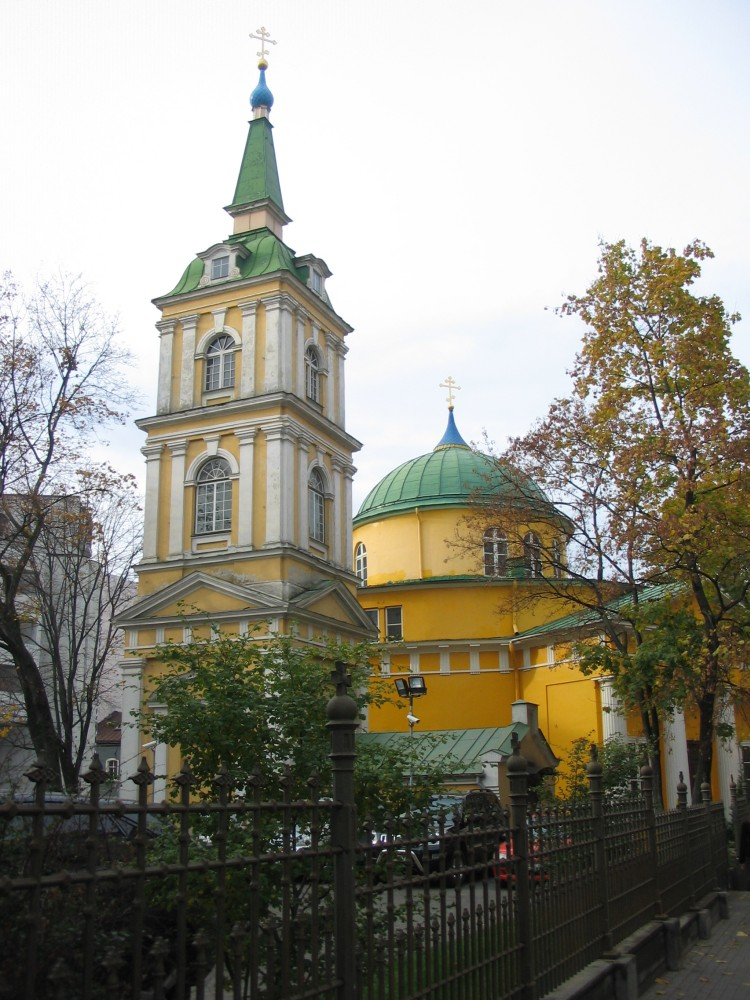
Number 56 - St. Alexander Nevsky Russian Orthodox Church, built in 1825

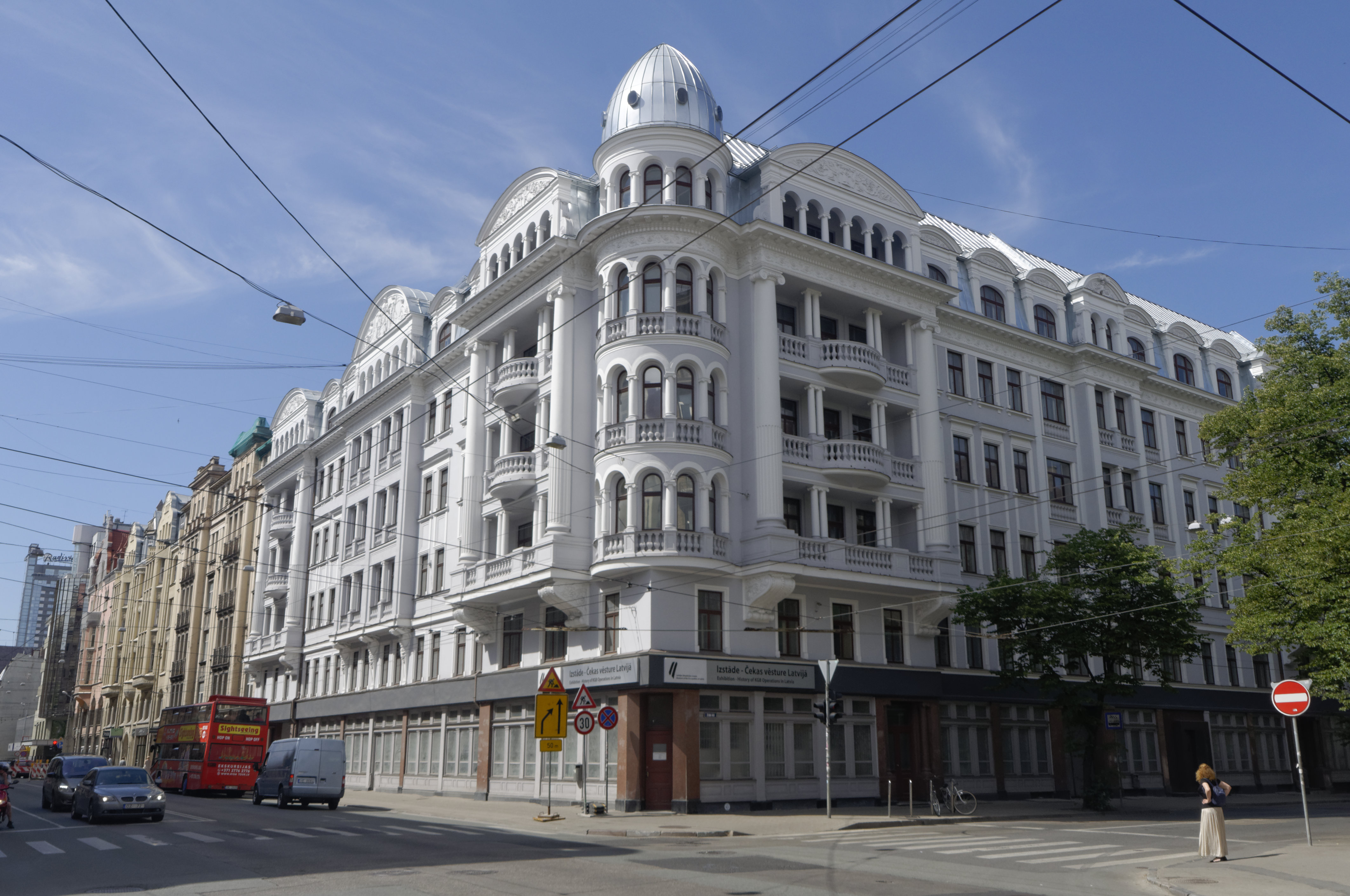
Number 61 - Corner House, former building of the KGB of the Latvian SSR during the second Soviet occupation of Latvia; initially built as a residential house in 1911

Brīvības iela 33

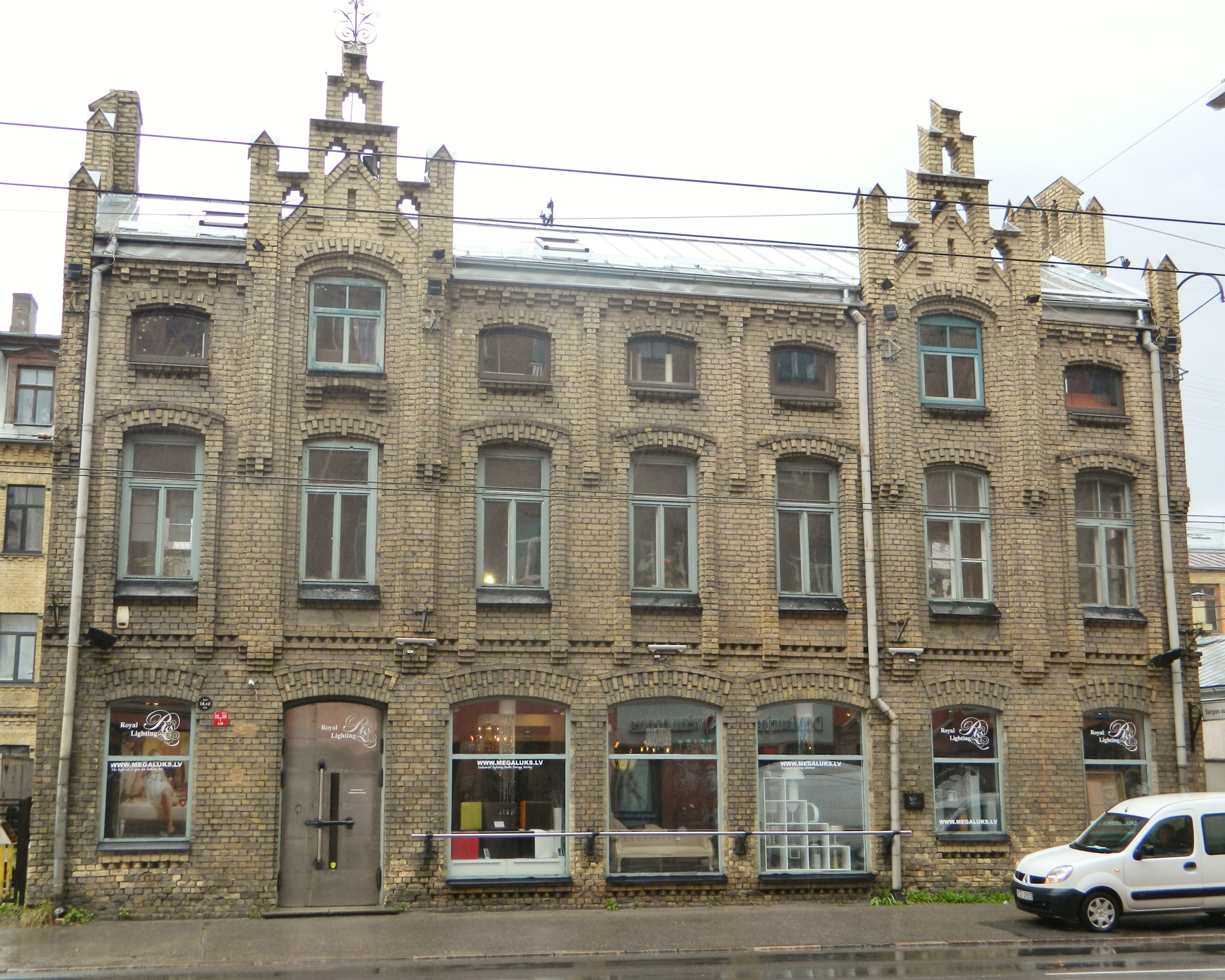
Brīvības iela 137, former A. Leutner Bicycle Works

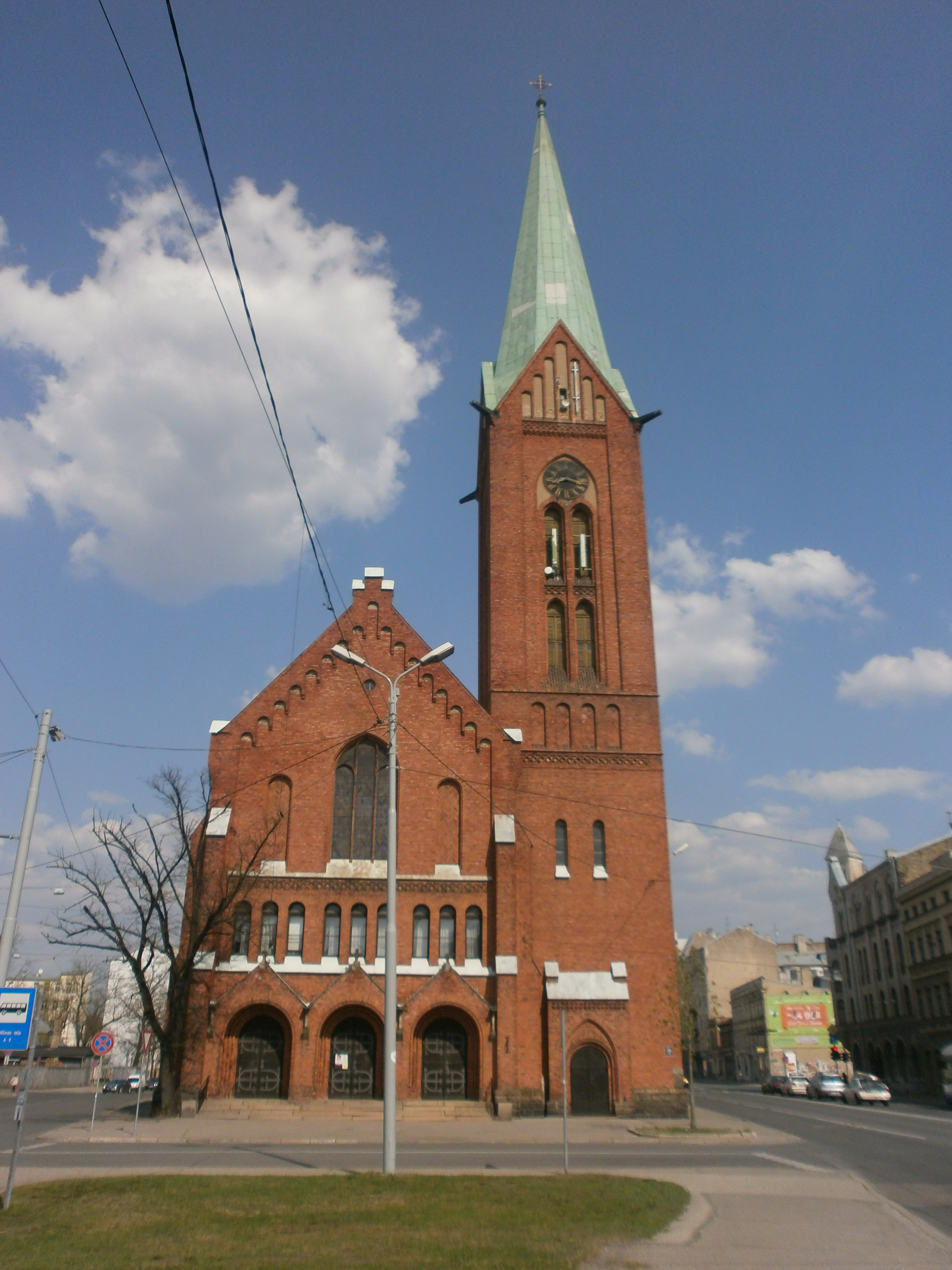
St. Gertrude New Church

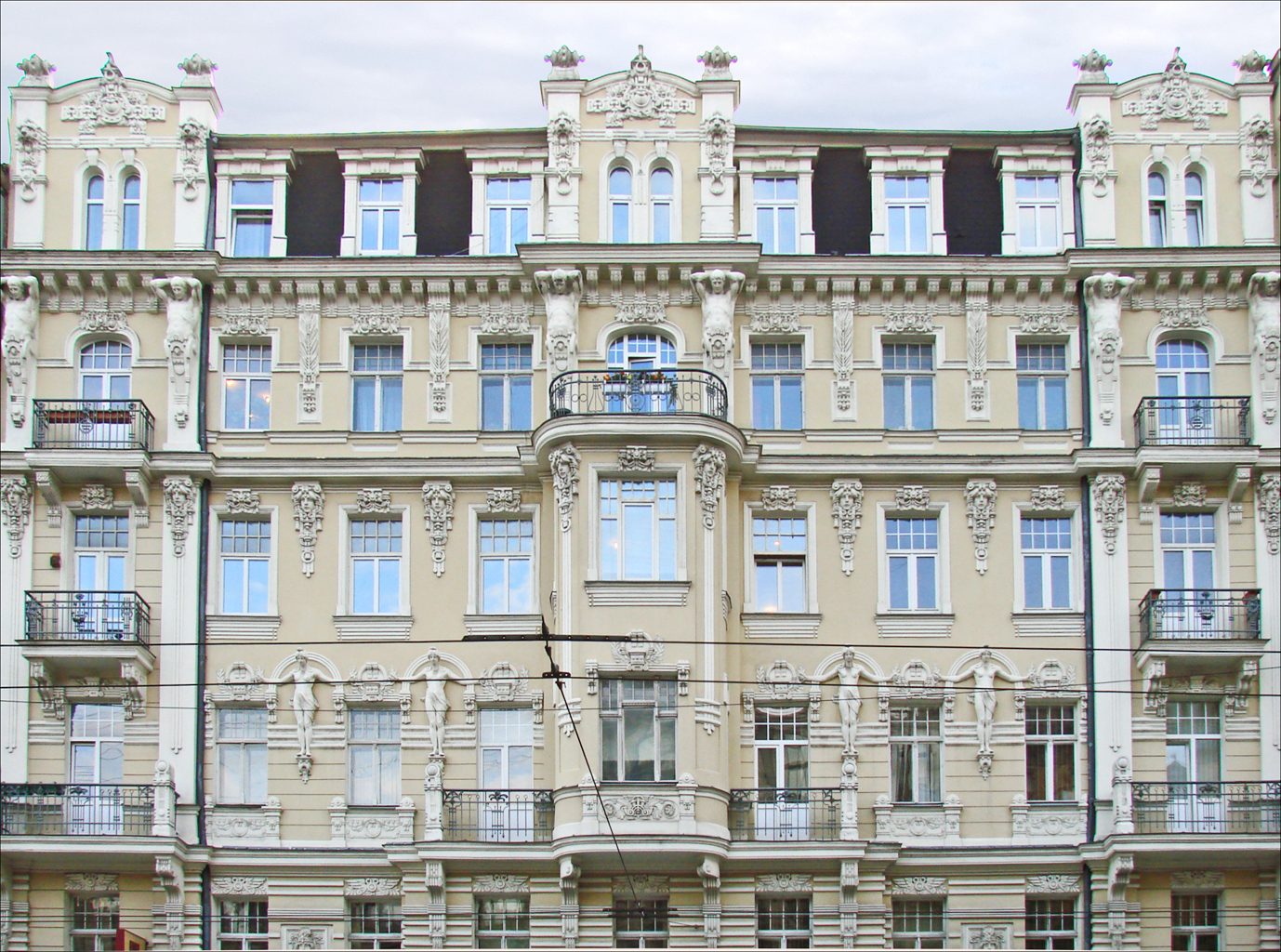
Number 99 - residential house by architect Mikhail Eisenstein, father of Soviet filmmaker Sergei Eisenstein; 1905
- Richard Wagner lived in 1838 - 1839 in a house at the intersection of Brīvības iela and Dzirnavu iela (Mühlenstraße). The house was destroyed but its location is now marked with a memorial plaque.
- Number 34 - Building of the Riga Regional Court designed by Jānis Frīdrihs Baumanis (1888)
- Number 75 - Dailes Theatre, formerly State Academic Theatre of the Latvian SSR; 1976

=== Brīvības gatve ===
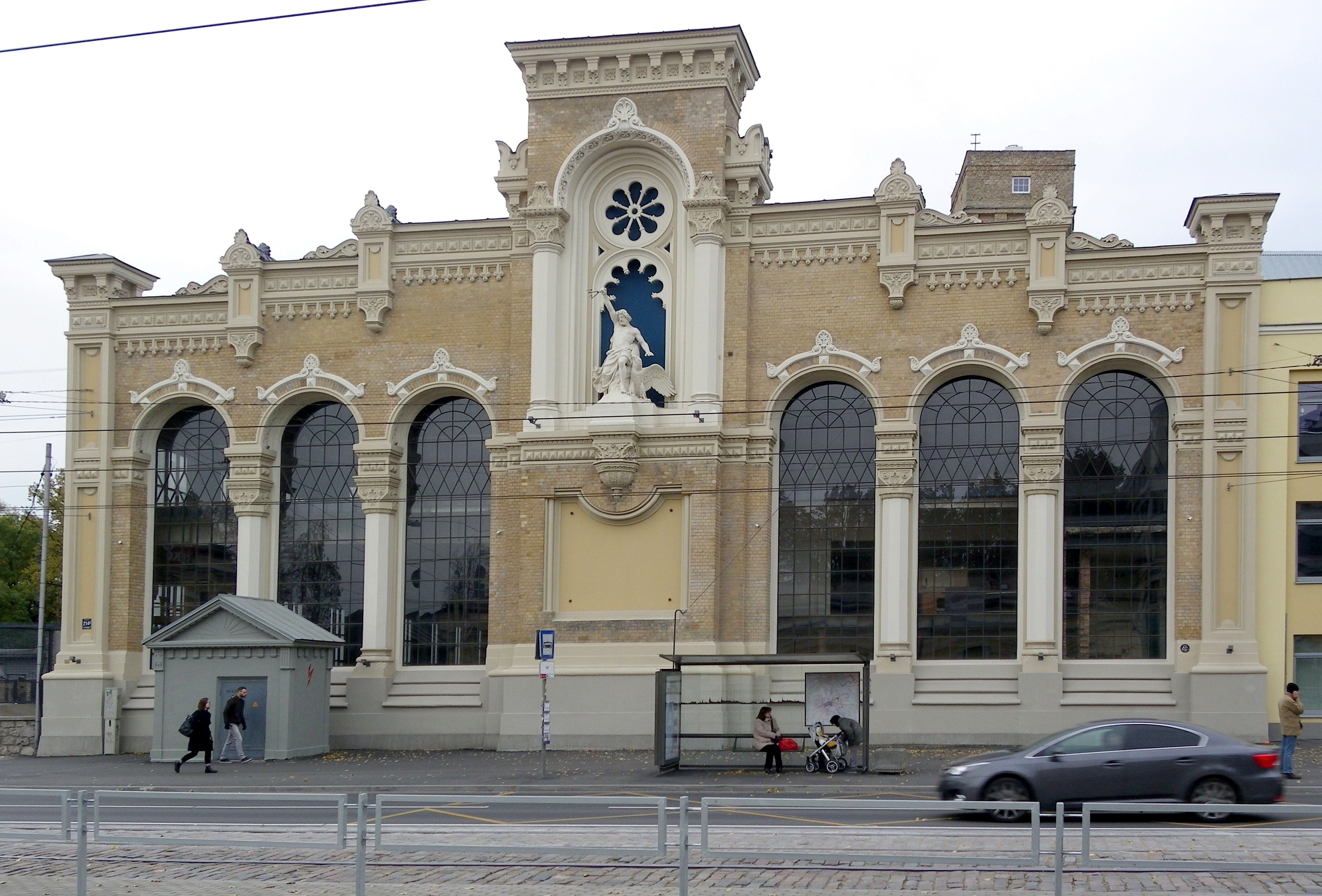
Historical building of VEF featuring a statue of Zeus holding a thunderbolt in the middle

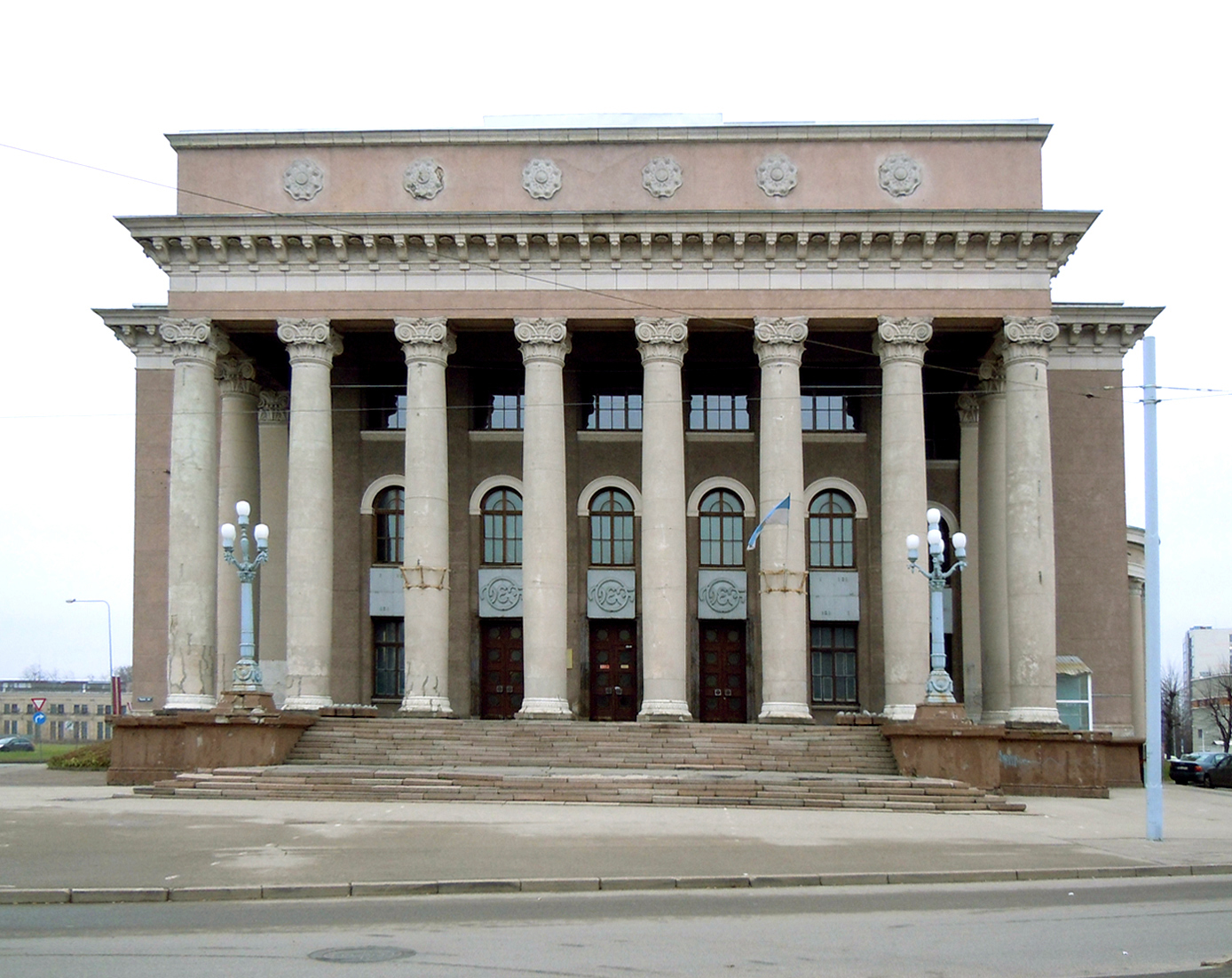
The VEF Palace of Culture

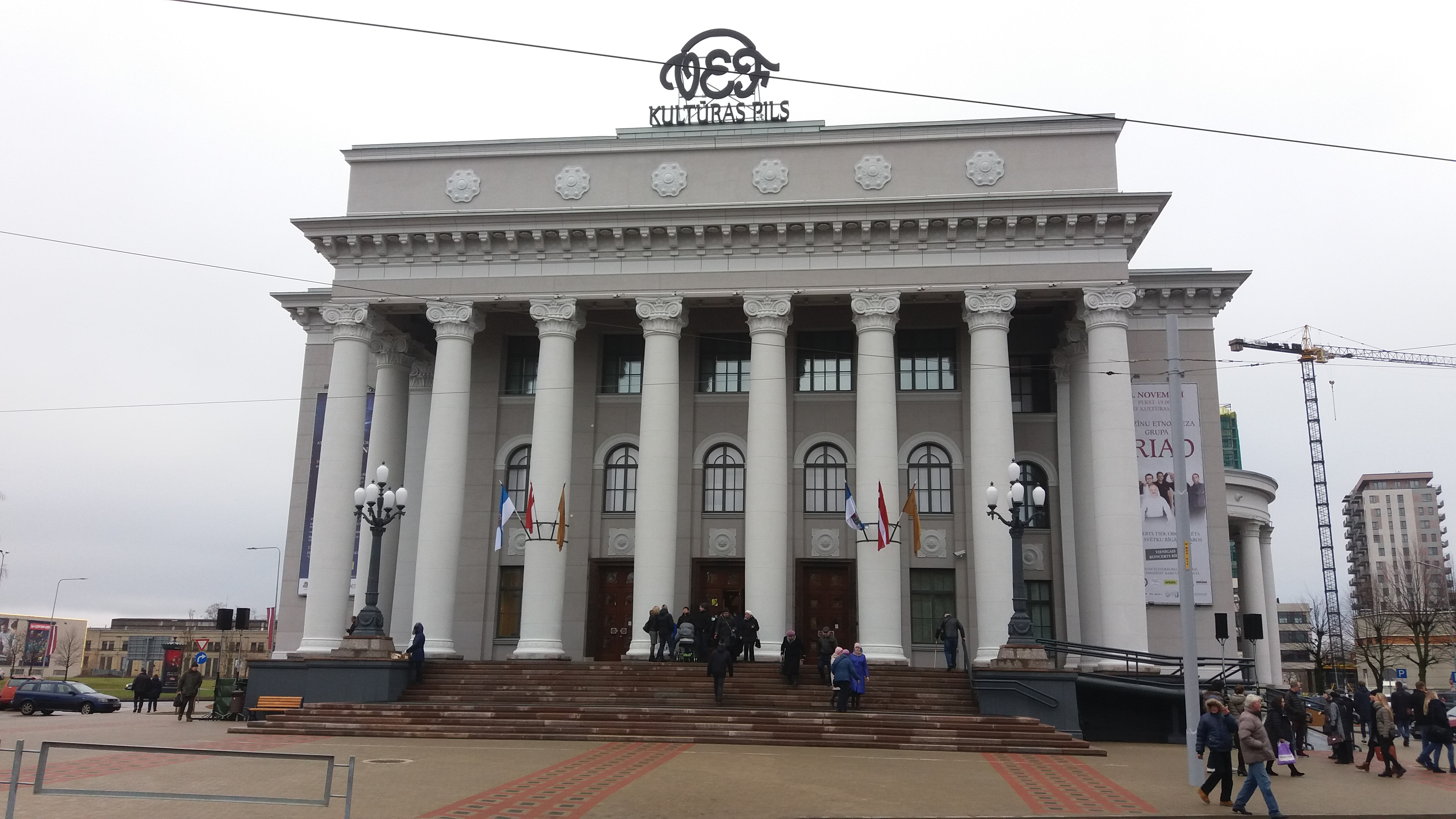
The VEF Palace of Culture after restoration in 2019
