= Sergejs Juhņevičs =

Latvian serial killer

- Born: 1975 (age 50–51); Jelgava, Latvian SSR
- Conviction: Murder x3
- Penalty: Life imprisonment

Details
- Victims: 3–6
- Span of crimes: 2008 – 2011 (confirmed); 1990s – 2011 (confessed)
- Country: Latvia
- State: Jelgava
- Date apprehended: 13 July 2011

Sergejs Juhņevičs (born 1975) is a Latvian serial killer who committed three sexually-motivated murders in his hometown of Jelgava from 2008 to 2011. After his arrest, he confessed to three additional murders dating back to the 1990s, but investigators were unable to substaintiate them.

For his confirmed crimes, Juhņevičs was convicted and sentenced to life imprisonment.

== Early life ==
Sergejs Juhņevičs was born in 1975 in Jelgava, the son of Polish immigrant Józef Juhņevičs and his Latvian wife. Despite the fact that Sergejs grew up in a stable family with no notable issues, he started displaying signs of a mental illness early on in his childhood. Due to this, as well as his struggles at school, his parents admitted him at the Ģintermuiža Psychoneurological Hospital in 1987.

During a psychiatric evaluation, he was diagnosed with schizophrenia and assigned a Group 2 disability status for psychiatric conditions. After that, Juhņevičs continued struggling with learning, and eventually stopped going to school or seeking work. Between 1987 and 2011, he was admitted to the hospital a total of 45 times due to his deteriorating mental health – during one such evaluation in 2005, his diagnosis of schizophrenia was reconfirmed.

According to investigators, Juhņevičs started to exhibit a heightened desire for women sometime in the late 2000s. However, women refused to start relationships with him due to his mental abnormalities, resulting in him frequently getting into conflicts with them.

== Murders ==
=== Confirmed murders ===
Juhņevičs' first known victim was killed on 12 July 2008. On that day, he met a 46-year-old woman and invited her for a drink, to which she agreed. After meeting up, the woman invited Juhņevičs to her apartment on Dobeles Street, where they continued drinking together. That same evening, Juhņevičs asked the woman to have sex with him, but she refused; he then flew into a rage and attacked her. During the attack, Juhņevičs beat the victim, then stabbed her several times in various parts of her body before ultimately strangling her to death.

On September 20 of that year, Juhņevičs committed his second murder. That evening, he met 45-year-old woman who was sitting on a bench near the "Tonuss" nightclub in Jelgava. The woman accepted his invitation to have a drink, after which she invited him to her garden shed. After several hours of drinking together, Juhņevičs began to sexually harass the woman, but she resisted him. He then became angry and attacked her, stabbing her to death. After the murder, Juhņevičs dismembered the body, placed the remains in polyethylene shopping bags, and dumped them in the Driksa River. In September 2008, a local fisherman discovered a bag containing the severed head of Juhņevičs' victim in the river, with the remainder of the body parts being found in the following weeks.

His last known murder occurred on 12 July 2011. On that day, an intoxicated Juhņevičs went to his 71-year-old neighbor's apartment. They spent some drinking alcohol together, after which a conflict arose between them; during the altercation, Juhņevičs raped the pensioner and then stabbed her to death, inflicting 39 stab wounds to vital parts of her body.

=== Suspected murders ===
During the investigation, Juhņevičs unexpectedly confessed to committing three additional murders: the murder of a woman in 2000 and the murders of two men sometime before that. Investigators initially concluded that he might have been responsible for the 2000 murder; however, due to a lack of clear evidence of his guilt in these killings, he was never charged.

== Arrest, investigation, and trial ==
As he was careless while committing his last murder, Juhņevičs was arrested on the next day. Almost immediately afterwards, he confessed to the three murders, as well as three additional victims dating back to the 1990s. In his testimony, he claimed that his schizophrenia caused anterograde amnesia, which is why he allegedly did not remember most of his actions during the murders and was acting in a state of passion at the time. He claimed that in one instance, he stopped stabbing the victim and began to realize what he was doing only after the knife broke in his hands. The main evidence of his guilt, aside from his confession, consisted of the results of molecular genetic analysis of bloodstains found on his hands and clothing, which belonged to his last victim, as well as the results of a forensic fingerprint analysis found on the murder weapon, which linked Juhņevičs to the crime scene.

In late summer 2011, Juhņevičs was transferred to a psychiatric clinic to determine his level of mental capacity, where specialists worked for him for two months. Despite his previous diagnosis of schizophrenia and his status as a person with a psychiatric disability, the expert evaluation found him to be of sound mind–a conclusion that sparked public outcry and controversy, and the findings themselves were subsequently called into question.

The trial began on 25 October 2011 at the Zemgale District Court in Jelgava. During the court proceedings, Juhņevičs fully admitted his guilt in the three murders but claimed that at the time they were committed, he was not in full possession of his faculties. Ultimately, on 24 November, the court found Juhņevičs guilty on all counts and sentenced to life imprisonment. In addition, the court granted the victims' civil claim for compensation for emotional distress. Specifically, the court ordered Juhņevičs to pay the son of one of the murdered women 300 lats for property damage and 19,400 lats for emotional distress. The court ordered Juhņevičs to pay the son of another murdered woman 500 lats for property damage and 1,000 lats for emotional distress. The son of Juhņevičs' last victim did not file a claim for compensation and did not attend the court hearings due to heart issues. Finally, Juhņevičs was ordered to pay 300 lats to the state to cover the cost for the prosecution an additional 1,200 lats fine.

Following Juhņevičs' conviction, his attorney Pāvels Pilāts, filed an appeal against his client's life sentence on the grounds that the psychiatric evaluation's results indicated that he was insane, as well as under the influence of alcohol and medication. However, in June 2012, the Supreme Court of Latvia rejected the appeal and upheld the lower court's verdict, as well as rejecting a motion for a new psychiatric evaluation.

== See also ==
- List of serial killers by country
