= Senator (disambiguation) =

A senator is a member of a senate, a type of deliberative body.

Senator(s) or The Senator may also refer to:

== People ==
- Senator (bishop of Milan) (died 475), also known as Senator of Settala
- Senator (consul 436), a politician of the Eastern Roman Empire
- Henry of Castile the Senator (1230–1303), Castilian infante; the fourth son of Ferdinand III of Castile by Beatrice of Swabia
- "The Senator", nickname for American jazz bassist Eugene Wright, member of The Dave Brubeck Quartet
- Hermann Senator (1834–1911), German internist physician
- Ronald Senator (1926–2015), British composer

== Sport teams ==
- Ottawa Senators, a Canadian ice hockey team
- Senadores de San Juan, a Puerto Rican baseball team
- Senators Baseball Club, a 1946–1947 Japanese baseball team, now the Hokkaido Nippon-Ham Fighters
- Tokyo Senators (1936–1939), later the Nishitetsu Baseball Club and other names, a defunct Japanese baseball team dissolved in 1943
- Washington Senators (1891–1899), a defunct U.S. baseball team first in the American Association, then in the National League
- Washington Senators (1901–1960), a U.S. baseball team in the American League, now the Minnesota Twins
- Washington Senators (1961–1971), a U.S. baseball team in the American League, now the Texas Rangers

== Ships ==
- Senator (sternwheeler), Oregon, from 1863 to 1875
- Senator (1848 ship), one of the first ocean-going steamers on the California Coast
- Senator (1898 ship), a Pacific coast steamer that participated in the Nome gold rush
- SS Senator, a Great Lakes freighter sunk in 1929 on Lake Michigan

== Film, television and theatre ==
- The Senator (play), an 1890 play and 1915 silent film
- The Bold Ones: The Senator, or The Senator, a 1970–1971 American TV series
- Chappaquiddick (film), or The Senator, a 2017 American political drama

== Other uses ==
- Opel Senator, also known as the Chevrolet Senator or Vauxhall Senator
- Roshel Senator, a Canadian armoured personnel carrier
- Hotel Senator (disambiguation)
- HSV Senator, an Australian luxury car made by Holden Special Vehicles
- Senator Theatre, in Baltimore, Maryland
- The Senator (tree), in Florida
- Lampromicra senator, an Australian species of insect in the family Scutelleridae, commonly known as the green jewel bug
- A member of the Supreme Court of Latvia
