= Senado =

Senado is the word for "senate" in, at least, Portuguese, Spanish and Tagalog. It may refer to:

== National senates ==
- Argentine Senate (Senado de la Nación Argentina)
- Senate of Bolivia (Cámara de Senadores)
- Federal Senate of Brazil (Senado Federal do Brasil)
- Senate of Chile (Senado de la República)
- Senate of Colombia (Senado de la República)
- Senate of the Dominican Republic (Senado de la República Dominicana)
- Senate of Equatorial Guinea (Senado or Cámara de Senadores)
- Senate of Mexico (Senado de la República)
- Senate of Paraguay (Cámara de Senadores)
- Senate of Peru (Senado de la República)
- Senate of the Philippines (Senado ng Pilipinas)
- Senate of Portugal (defunct)
- Senate of Puerto Rico (Senado de Puerto Rico)
- Senate of Spain (Senado de España)
- Senate of Uruguay (Cámara de Senadores)
- Senate of Venezuela (defunct)

== Other senates ==
- Louisiana State Senate (Senado del Estado de Luisiana)
- Texas Senate (Senado de Texas)

== Places ==
- Palacio del Senado, in Spain
- Senado Square (Largo do Senado), in Macau

== See also ==
- Senate (disambiguation)
