= Senate (disambiguation) =

A senate is a deliberative assembly, often the upper house or chamber of a bicameral legislature.

Senate or the Senate may also refer to:

- Any one of the national senates in the world, including
  - The Australian Senate
  - The Brazilian Senate
  - The United States Senate
  - The Japanese Senate
- An academic senate, faculty senate or senate of a university
- The Roman Senate
- Supreme Court of Latvia
- The fictional Galactic Senate from the Star Wars franchise, the governing body of the Galactic Republic
- Princess Senate Seeiso, the eldest child of King Letsie III of Lesotho
- The Senate (band), a white soul cover band active in Europe in the mid-late 1960s

== See also ==
- Senator (disambiguation)
- Senat (disambiguation)
- Senet (disambiguation)
