= State Chancellery of Latvia =

The State Chancellery of Latvia (Latvian: Latvijas Valsts kanceleja) is a central public administration institution directly subordinated to the Prime Minister.

The State Chancellery is headed by its director, who is a top-rank official appointed to and dismissed from the post by the Cabinet order and upon recommendation of the Prime Minister. The Director and other civil servants of the State Chancellery are appointed to the post in line with the "State Civil Service Law".

It is headquartered in the Palace of Justice, which functions as the seat of government.

== Structure and functions ==
The State Chancellery comprises Prime Minister's Office, departments, divisions and individual units set up by the Director of the State Chancellery. The State Chancellery ensures and controls compliance of policy documents and draft legal acts of the Cabinet with the effective requirements; develops and implements policy action plans in various areas and presents opinions on policy documents and legal acts, as well as technically arranges activities of the Cabinet of Ministers.

Subordinate institution of the State Chancellery is the Latvian School of Public Administration (since 1 January 2003).

=== Functions of the State Chancellery ===
- to provide preparation and process of Cabinet sittings, to ensure preparation of Cabinet's documentation according to the procedure set forth in the relevant laws and regulations; to perform management of Cabinet's documentation;
- to participate in the policy planning processes pursuant to the Cabinet's guidelines and tasks assigned by the Cabinet;
- to coordinate planning and implementation of the national policy; in cooperation with ministries to present proposals on priorities for national development;
- to ensure elaboration of the development policy of public administration (incl. the state civil service) and coordinate and supervise its implementation;
- when assigned by the Prime Minister, to coordinate and to control enforcement of the decisions adopted by the Cabinet of Ministers and the Prime Minister;
- to inform the public about work and activities of the Cabinet of Ministers.

The Cabinet of Ministers of the Republic of Latvia.

== Director of the State Chancellery ==
The State Chancellery is led by its director, who organises the administrative work of the State Chancellery. Since April 2017 the director of the State Chancellery is Jānis Cickovskis.

The Director of the State Chancellery is a direct subordinate of the Prime Minister and is responsible for lawfulness and performance of the institution. The Director of the State Chancellery is appointed to and dismissed from the post by an order of the Cabinet of Ministers upon initiative of the Prime Minister.

=== Functions of the director ===
- provides preparation of budget claims of the Cabinet of Ministers and public administration institutions under subordination of the Prime Minister and their submission to the Ministry of Finance, provides allocation, recording and control of the granted state budget funds and is responsible for lawful and reasonable usage of the budget of the State Chancellery in compliance with the Law "On Annual State Budget";
- provides the production of institution's development strategy and activity plan;
- according to the procedure set forth in the regulatory enactments, presents a report on usage of the granted state budget funds;
- provides performance of personnel management;
- according to the procedure set forth in the regulatory enactments, appoints to and dismisses from the post public servants of the institution and appoints to and dismisses from the post employees of the institution;
- without a special authorisation represents the institution and concludes agreements on behalf of it;
- authorises officials of the State Chancellery to represent the institution in state and local government institutions, as well as in relations with non-governmental and international organisations;
- organises and chairs meetings of State Secretaries;
- in order to ensure performance of the tasks and functions of the State Chancellery, has the right to give orders to the civil servants and employees of the State Chancellery;
- examines complaints on decisions passed by officials of the State Chancellery and cancels unlawful decisions passed by officials of the institution.

== History of the State Chancellery ==
The formation and development of the State Chancellery

=== 1918–1934 ===
Following the proclamation of the independent State of Latvia on 18 November 1918 its higher state administrative body - the Provisional Government of Latvia - was established.

The government administration of the independent Latvia was first mentioned on 26 November 1918 when administrator of the Chancellery of the Provisional Government Dāvids Rudzītis prepared the protocol of the first official sitting of the Government. On 1 January 1919, the Government “establishes that Dāvids Rudzītis has been in his position as the administrator of the Chancellery of the Provisional Government since 20 November 1918”. Therefore, 20 November 1918 can be considered as the date of formation of the State Chancellery.

The institution was conferred its current name on 11 April 1919 when the Chancellery of the Provisional Government was renamed the State Chancellery, and D.Rudzītis was appointed as the Director of the State Chancellery.

The Law on the Structure of the Cabinet of Ministers adopted on 1 April 1925 stipulated that “the State Chancellery shall oversee the record-keeping of the Cabinet and the Prime Minister. The director of the State Chancellery shall administer the budget of the Cabinet and of the State Chancellery.” This law also laid down that the director and other civil servants of the State Chancellery are contracted in compliance with the Civil Service Law. Thus, the legal status of the State Chancellery was enforced.

=== 1934–1940 ===
On 15 May 1934, a coup led by Kārlis Ulmanis took place. The Saeima (Parliament) was dissolved and activities of the political parties halted. It implemented not only the functions of the executive power but it had also become a legislative power, fully taking over the functions of the Saeima. The role of the government administration significantly increased, for example, the Codification Division which from the Ministry of Justice in 1926 went under the Saeima now had come under the authority of the State Chancellery. During the authoritarian regime, the concentration of power and the role of public institutions were ever more increased and in 1936 K.Ulmanis became the President and the Prime Minister of Latvia.

According to the announcement of the President and the Prime Minister of 15 November 1938, D.Rudzītis was invited to become a member of the Cabinet of Ministers. At the same time, he also continued to perform his duties in the capacity of the director of the State Chancellery.

=== 1940–1990 ===
On 17 June 1940, Latvia came under the occupation by the Soviet forces. The USSR administration tried to achieve the conditions under which further annexation of Latvia would seem legal – the public institutions continued to work under strict supervision by the USSR for the following few months. Formally, operation of the State Chancellery ceased on 27 August 1940, when it was renamed as the Chancellery of the Council of People's Commissars but in fact the final date was June 17, 1940, when the Government of K.Ulmanis ceased to exist.

For the following 50 years the territory of Latvia remained under foreign powers. During 1941–1945 the territory of Latvia was under control by the Nazi Germany, and after the defeat of Germany in World War II the Soviet occupation regime returned to the territory of Latvia. A further sovietization of Latvia was being carried out, the government of the Latvian SSR and its administration (since 1946 – Affairs Administration of the Council of Ministers of the Latvian SSR) did not act in the interests of the Latvian nation. For example, on 17 March 1949, the decision on deportation of more than 40,000 people in Latvia to the most distant regions of the USSR was signed both by the Chair of the Council of Ministers of the Latvian SSR and I.Bastins, Affairs Manager of the Council of Ministers of the Latvian SSR.

Mikhail Gorbachev after becoming a Soviet leader in 1985 launched democratic reforms. That was the beginning of Atmoda (Latvian national awakening), the Government of the Latvian SSR and its administration commenced implementation of an independent policy; already in 1990 the majority in the Government supported the idea for an independent state.

Following the renewal of the Latvian independence, all power structures of the Latvian SSR were reorganised including the Affairs Administration of the Council of Ministers of the Latvian SSR and the renewal of the State Chancellery.

=== 1990–2008 ===
After the adoption of the declaration of independence of the Republic of Latvia on 4 May 1990 the democratic reforms in the public administration of Latvia were launched. By the time when the Latvian Constitution (Satversme) and the Law on Structure of the Cabinet of Ministers were re-enforced, the State Chancellery had experienced three reorganisations.

According to the decision “On Activities of the Public Administration Institutions under Conditions of Restoring the Independence” adopted by the Council of Ministers of the Republic of Latvia on 25 May 1990, the Affairs Administration of the Council of Ministers was abolished and replaced by the Government Administration of the Republic of Latvia, headed by Kārlis Līcis, Minister of Governmental Affairs, in order to ensure the implementation of the operative activities of the Council of the Ministers.

On 26 November 1991, the Government Administration was abolished and replaced by the Government Apparatus headed by Valdis Zeikats.

The name of the State Chancellery was again mentioned in the Law “On the Council of Ministers” of 18 March 1992. Upon the adoption of the decision “On Reorganisation of the Government Apparatus of the Republic of Latvia” of 19 November 1992, the State Chancellery was embraced in the Government Apparatus as a structural unit. The primary responsibility of the Government Apparatus remained the same – providing the activities of the Government.

== The renewed State Chancellery ==
With the election of the 5th Saeima, the Constitution (Satversme) of Latvia was renewed and on 3 August 1993 the Law “On Re-enforcement of the Law “On Structure of the Cabinet of Ministers” of 1 April 1925” came into effect. The above-mentioned law renewed the historical status of the State Chancellery and stipulated its key functions, namely, the provision of the activities of the Cabinet of Ministers and the Prime Minister, and ensuring optimal and operational decision-making in line with the Constitution and other laws.

Activities of the State Chancellery are regulated by the Rules of the State Chancellery approved by the Cabinet of Ministers on 20 May 2003.
