= Senat =

Senat may refer to:

== People ==
- Deadrin Senat (born 1994), American football player
- Greg Senat (born 1994), American football player

== Other uses ==
- senat, sénat, and senát, meaning "senate" in multiple languages
- Senet, also called senat, an ancient Egyptian board game
- Aurus Senat, a Russian full-size luxury sedan

== See also ==
- Kai Cenat (born 2001), American online streamer and YouTuber
- Senate (disambiguation)
- Senet (disambiguation)
