= Senet (disambiguation) =

Senet is an ancient Egyptian board game.

Senet may also refer to:

== People ==
- Senet (queen), ancient Egyptian queen
- Daniel Senet (born 1953), French weightlifter

== See also ==
- Senat (disambiguation)
- Senate (disambiguation)
