= St. Alexander Nevsky Church, Riga =

Church in Riga, Latvia

St. Alexander Nevsky Church
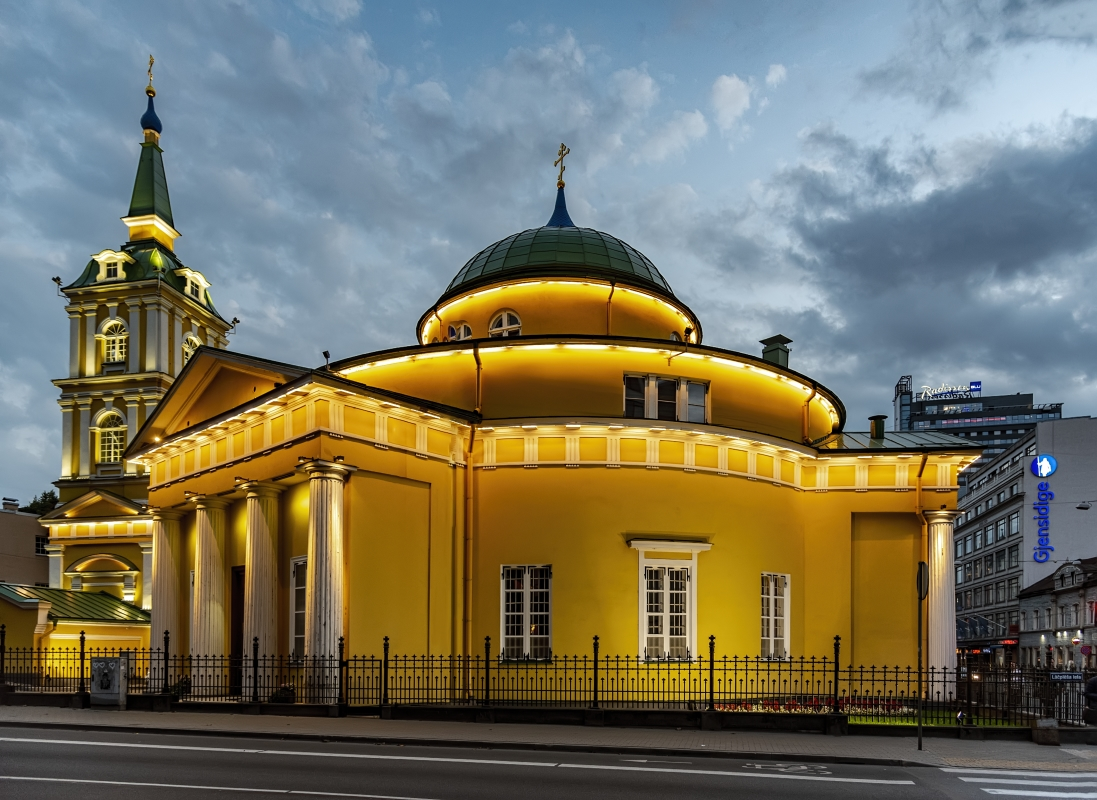
- View of the Church

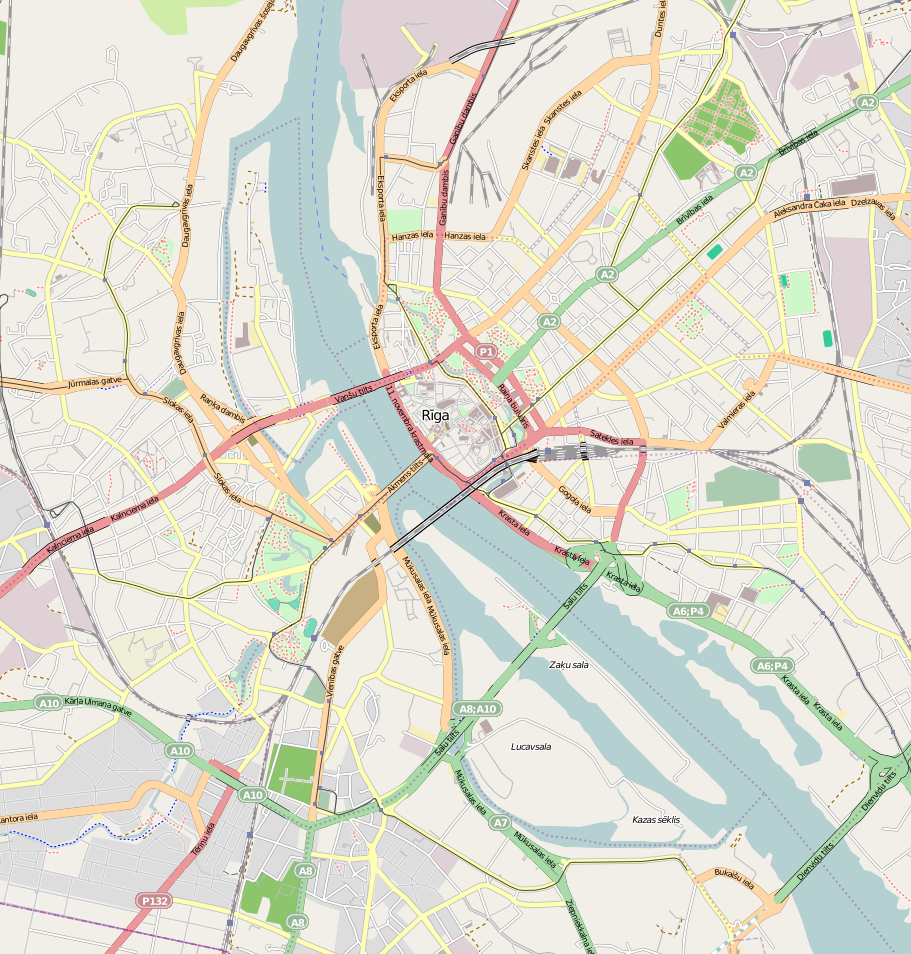
- Location within Riga
- 56°57′22.02″N 24°7′16.90″E
- Location: Riga
- Country: Latvia
- Denomination: Eastern Orthodox

St. Alexander Nevsky Church (Latvian: Svētā Ņevas Aleksandra pareizticīgo baznīca; Russian: Церковь Александра Невского) is an Eastern Orthodox church in Riga, the capital of Latvia. The church is situated at the address 56 Brīvības Street.
