= Palace of Justice, Riga =

Set of courthouses and administrative buildings in Riga, Latvia

Latvijas Tiesu pils
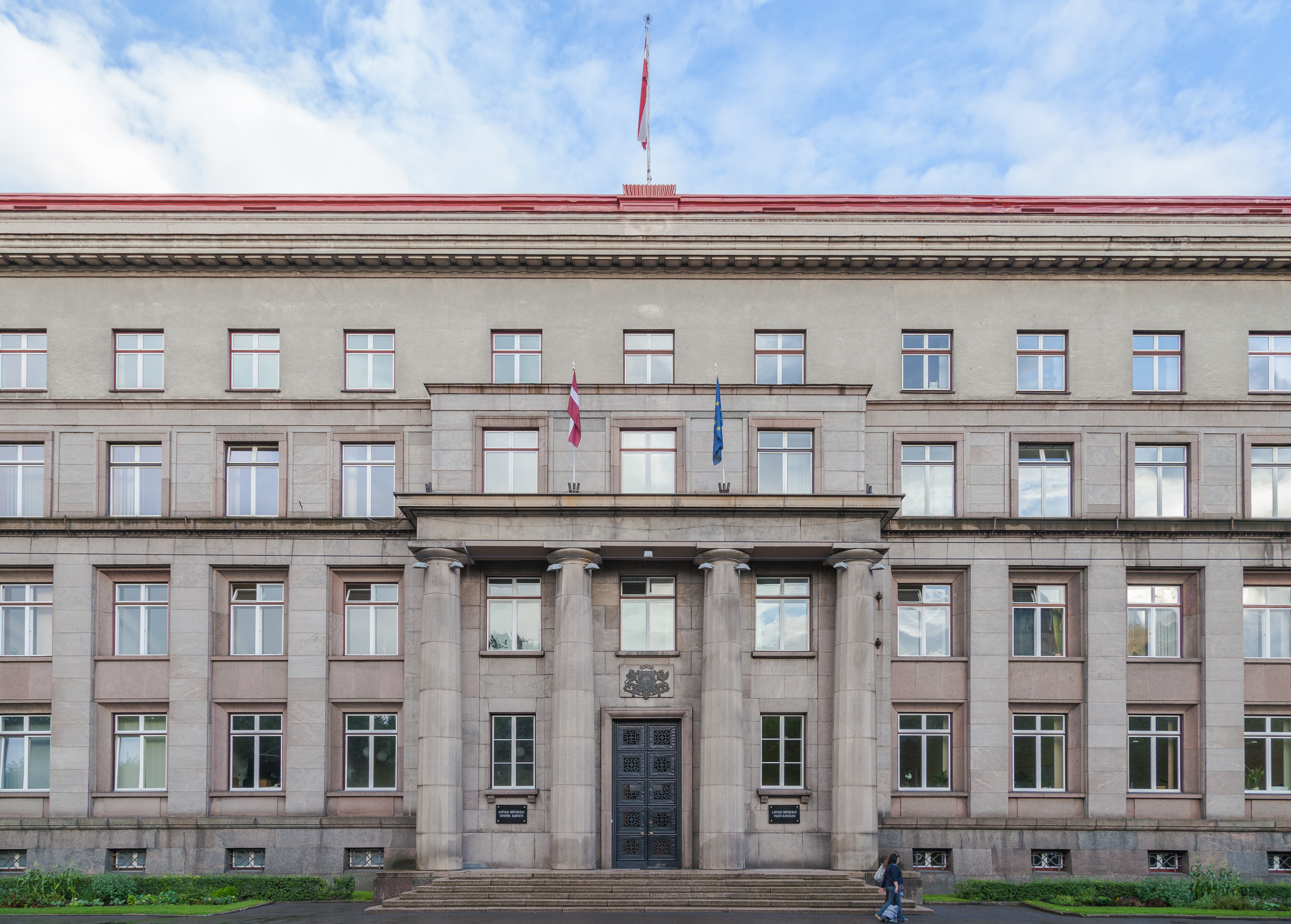
- Brīvības bulvāris (Freedom Boulevard), Riga.

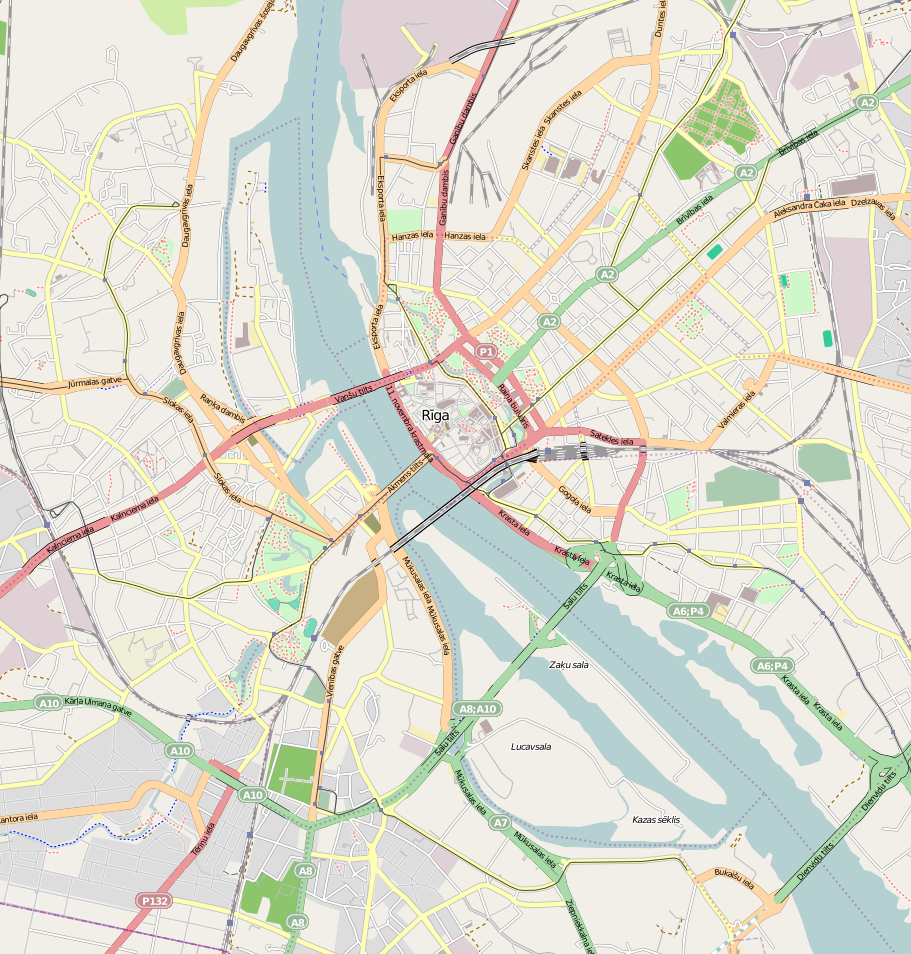
- Location within Riga
- Alternative names: Cabinet of Ministers Building

General information
- Architectural style: Neoclassical
- Location: 36 Brīvības bulvāris, Riga, Latvia
- Coordinates: 56°57′13″N 24°7′4.08″E
- Construction started: 4 December 1936
- Completed: 1938
- Inaugurated: 9 December 1938

Design and construction
- Architect: Frīdrihs Skujiņš

The Palace of Justice (Latvian: Latvijas Tiesu pils) is a set of courthouses and administrative buildings in Riga. It is the location of sittings of the Supreme Court of Latvia, of the Cabinet of Ministers of Latvia and the headquarters of the Ministry of Justice.

== History ==
=== Senate ===
Between 1918 and 1940 the highest judicial power in Latvia was the Senate of Latvia (Latvijas Senāts). The first section of the building was constructed between 1936 and 1938 as a new home for the Senate and the Ministry of Justice under the authoritarian regime of Kārlis Ulmanis. The foundation stone was laid by War Minister Jānis Balodis and it was officially opened by Justice Minister Hermanis Apsītis. The building was not completed in full before the Second World War. The wing which today accommodates the Supreme Court was constructed during the Stalinist era.

=== Executive building ===
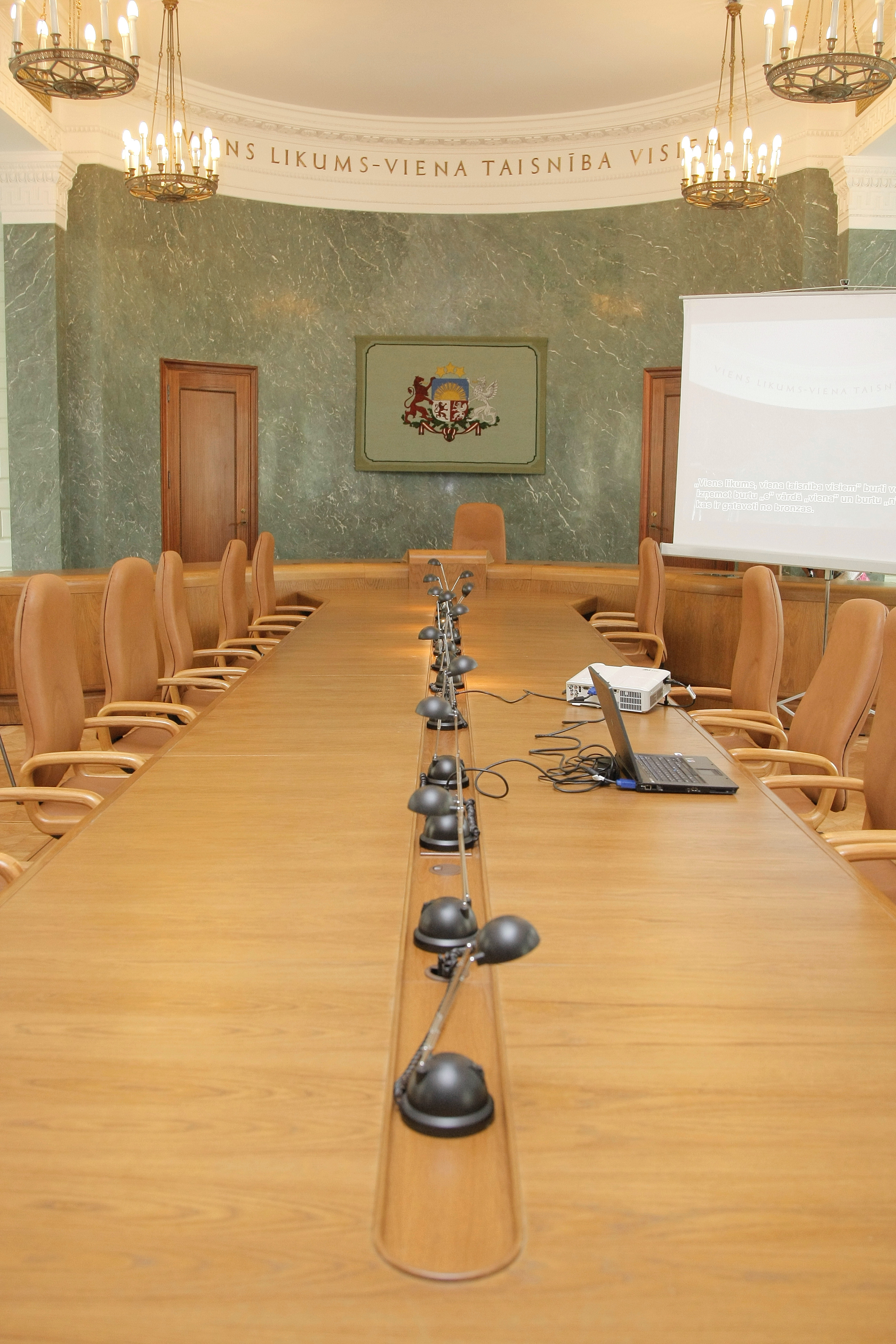
Old Senate chamber. The judicial motto viens likums - viena taisnība visiem (one law, one truth for all) alludes to the building's origins.

During the alternating Nazi and Soviet occupations the building was home to the Reich Commissariat and the Latvian SSR Council of Ministers. Since the 1990s the usual meeting place of the Cabinet of Latvia has been the old Senate chamber.

== Location ==
The building is located on Brīvības bulvāris (Freedom Boulevard) at the triangular intersection of Elizabetes iela, Tērbatas iela (Tartu street) and Brīvības. Next door is the Riga Regional Court (Rīgas apgabaltiesa).
