= Powder Tower, Riga =

Former defensive tower in Latvia

Powder Tower in Riga
- Pulvertornis
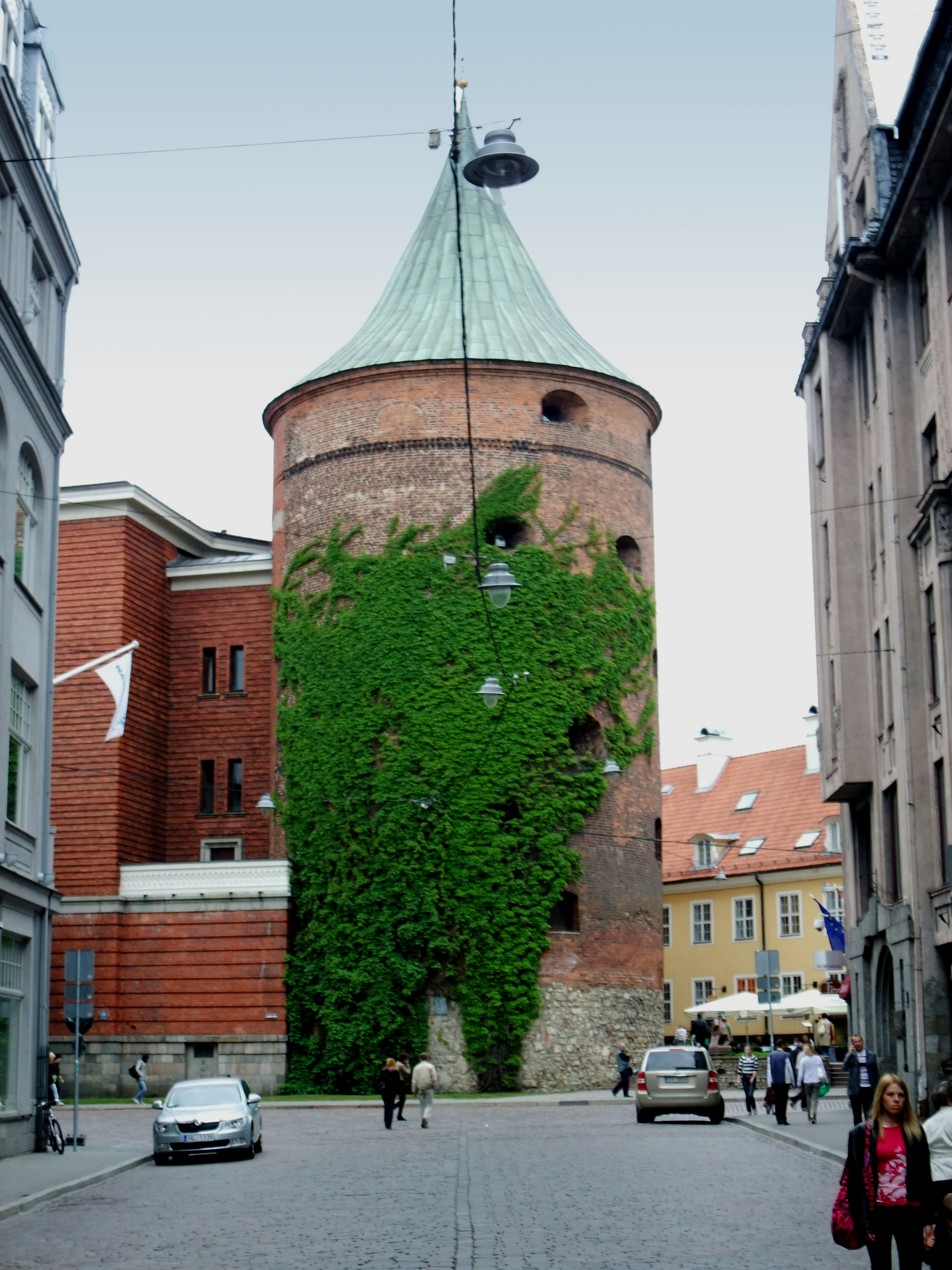
- The tower in 2010
- Interactive map of the Powder Tower in Riga area

General information
- Type: Tower
- Architectural style: Medieval
- Location: Smilšu iela 20, Riga, Latvia
- Coordinates: 56.9513°N 24.1087°E
- Completed: 1650
- Renovated: 1940

Height
- Roof: 25.6 metres (84 ft)

Dimensions
- Diameter: 14.3 metres (47 ft)

The Powder Tower (Latvian: Pulvertornis) is situated in Riga, Latvia, and originally a part of the defensive system of the town. The current Powder Tower was built in 1650 and renovated in the years 1937 to 1940 when it was added to the structure of the Latvian War Museum.

== History ==
The tower was first mentioned in 1330 as the Sand Tower (the name apparently derives from the sand hills opposite the tower). The entrance to the tower was five metres (16 ft) above the ground and the building could only be entered by a narrow staircase. During the Swedish attack on Poland of 1621, the entire tower was destroyed, except the basement, on which the now visible Powder Tower was built in 1650. In horizontal cross-section, the tower was horseshoe-shaped: in some places, the three-metre (9.8 ft) thick wall of the tower faced the outskirts, while the wall on the city side was made of wood (bricks at the time were an expensive building material). The name of the powder tower dates back to the 17th century when apparently gunpowder was stored in it. There were 11 cannons in the tower, and a "bomb catcher" was installed: between the fifth and sixth floors, a meter-thick ceiling of three layers of oak and pine logs was laid. Later in the tower was a prison, and torture chambers, weapons were stored until 1883. In the walls of the tower can be seen cannonballs, which were placed in commemoration of the Second Northern War.

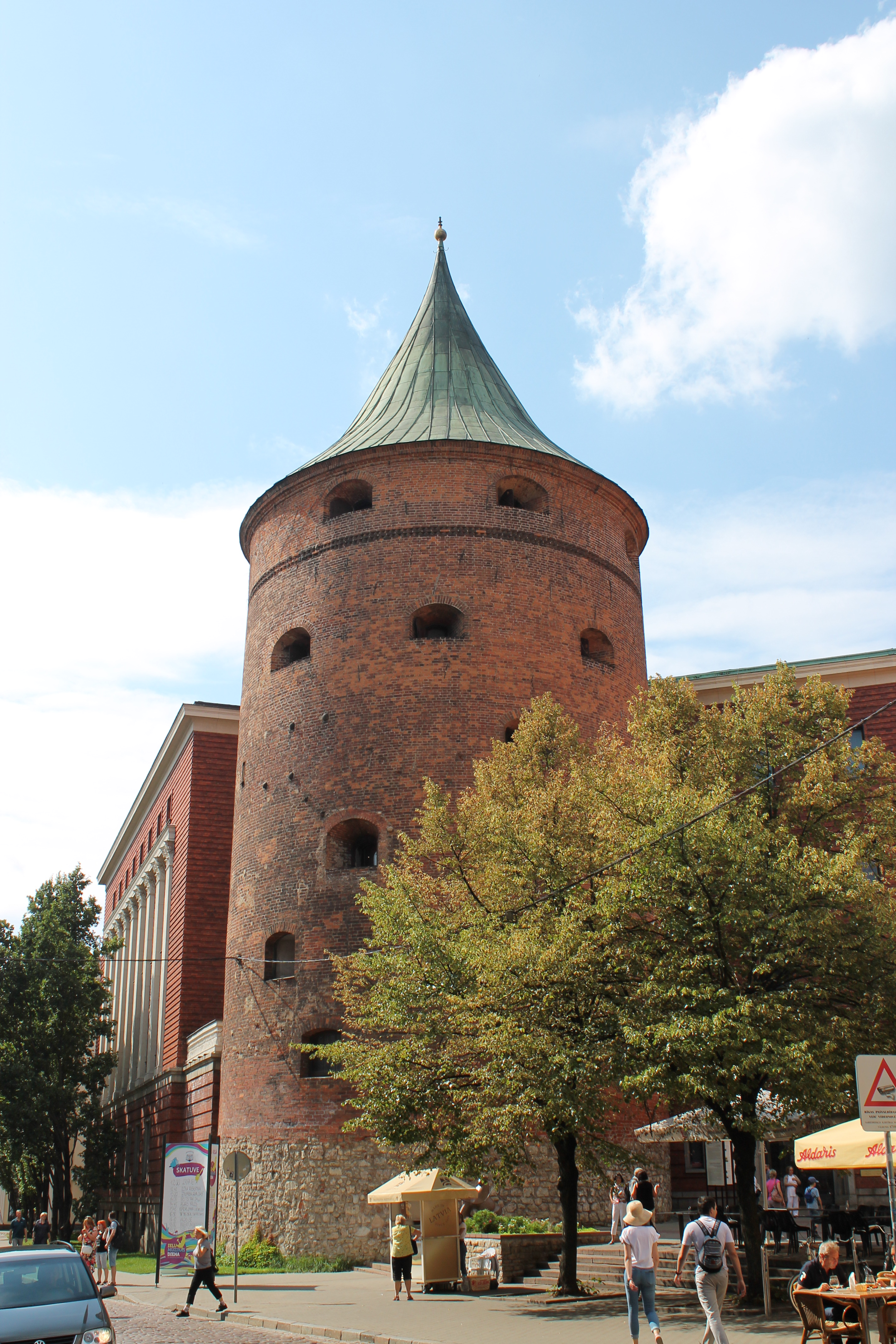
Cannonballs in the wall of the tower

== Gallery ==
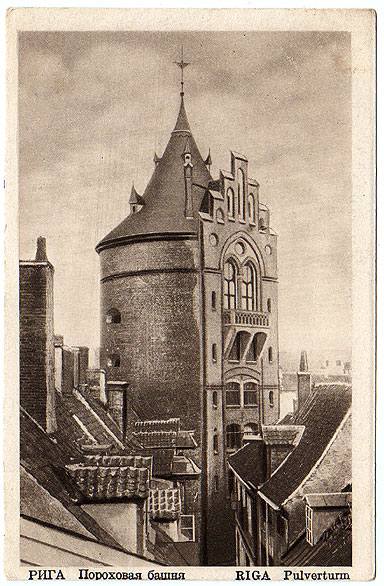
Early 20th century postcard

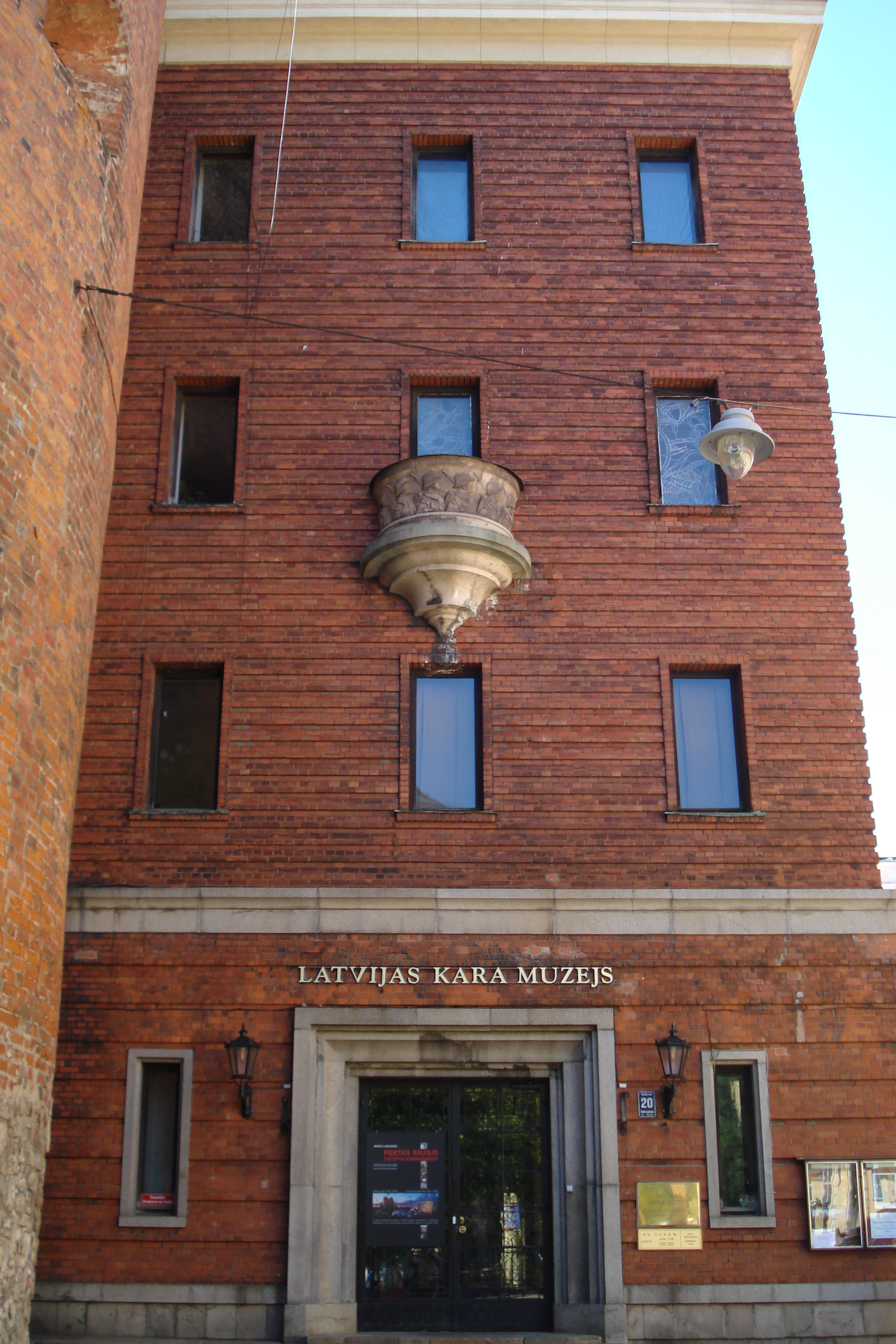
Museum entrance

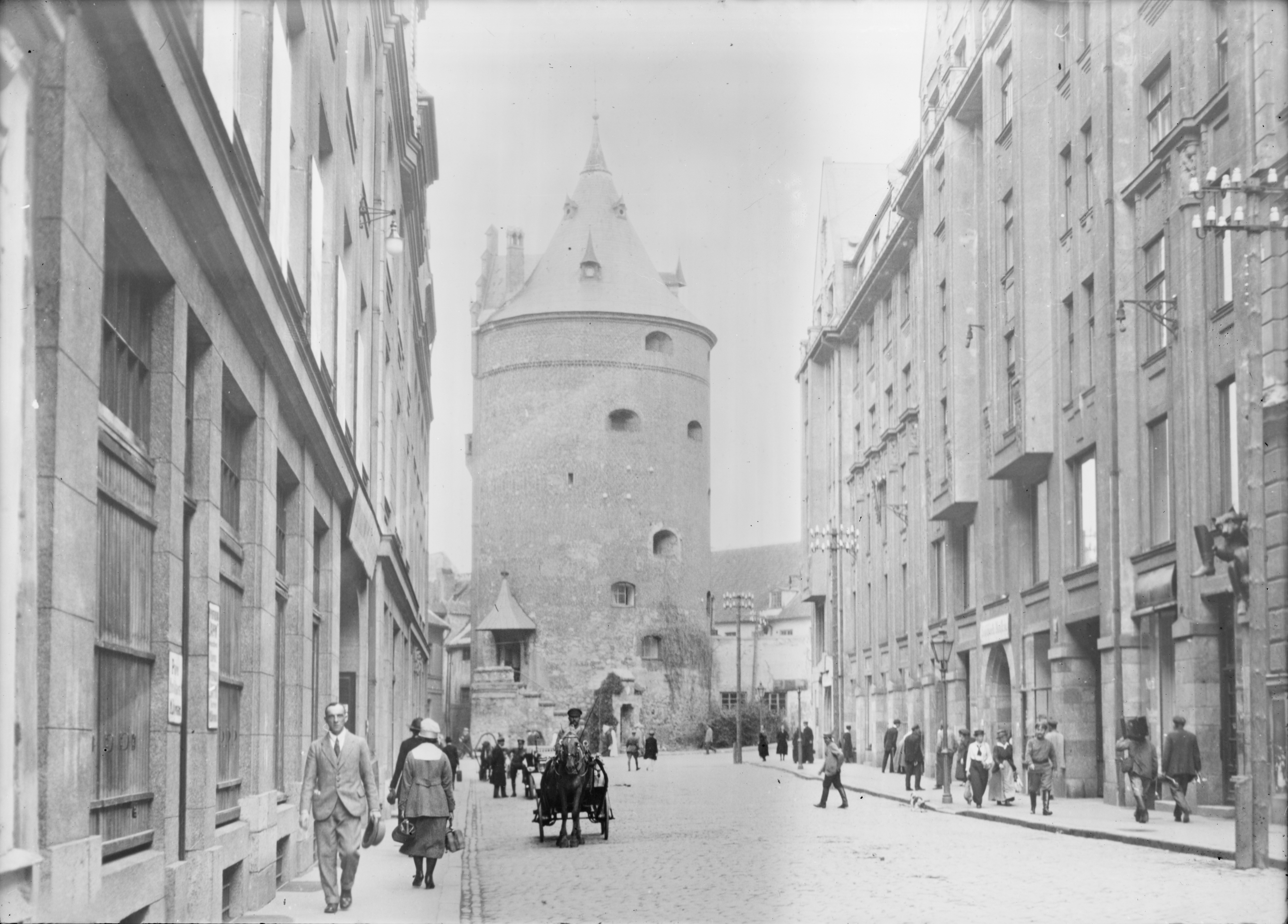
Powder tower in 1920s.
