= Hotel Senator =

Hotel Senator or Senator Hotel may refer to:

Canada

- Hotel Senator (Saskatoon)

United States

- Senator (Atlantic City hotel)
- Senator Hotel, in Sacramento, California
