= Supreme Court of Latvia =

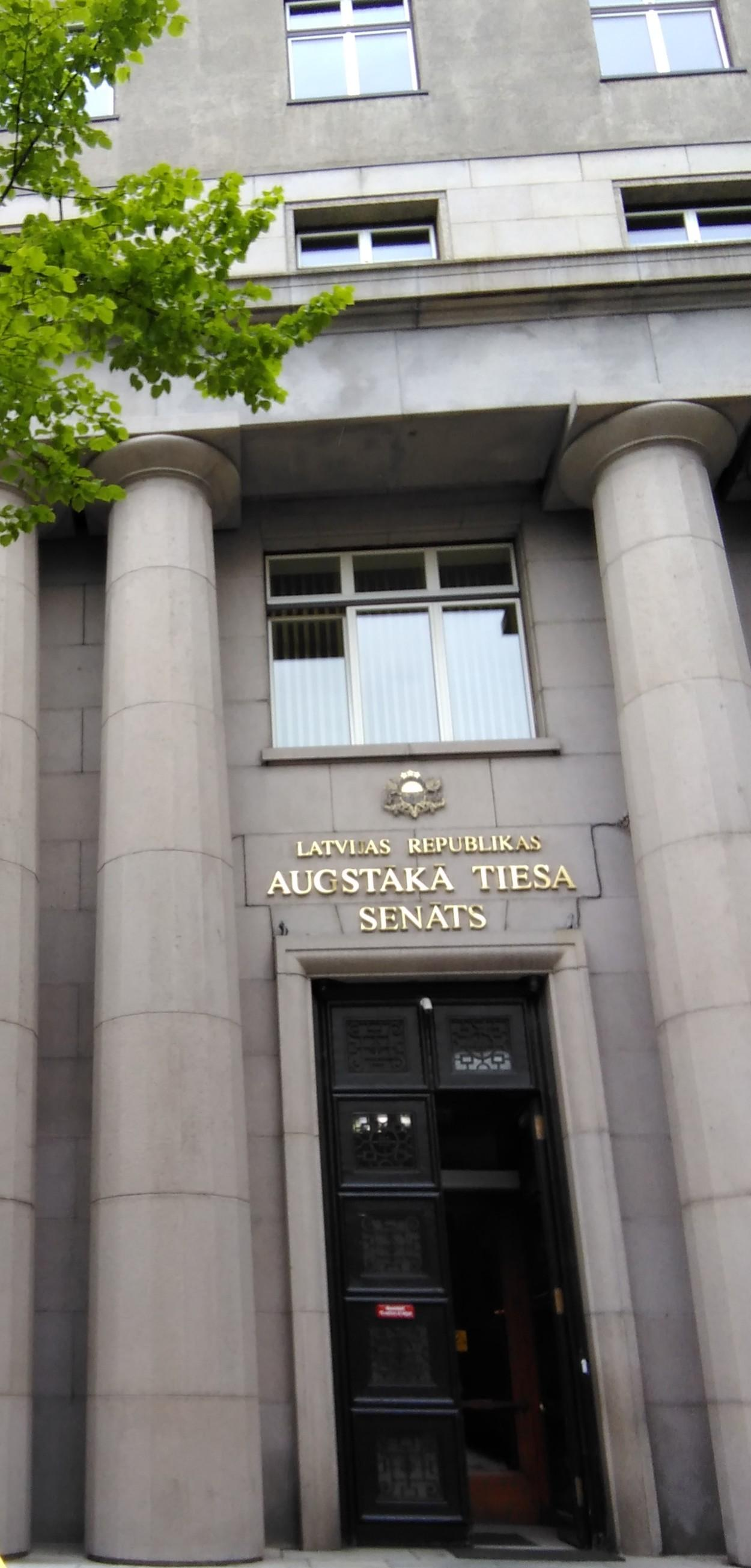
Supreme Court (Senate) of Latvia

The Supreme Court of the Republic of Latvia (Latvian: Latvijas Republikas Augstākā tiesa) or the Senate of Latvia (Latvijas Senāts) is the highest level court in the three-tiered court system of Latvia. It deals with criminal, civil and administrative matters. Its oversight is determined in the Constitution, the structure and competence of the court are established by the Act On Judicial Power. The Court consists of the Civil Cases Court, three departments, administration and two divisions, located in the Palace of Justice on Brīvības bulvāris, Central Riga.

Since 1995, there have been three levels of courts in Latvia. The first level courts are the district (city) courts; the second level are the regional courts and the third level is the Supreme Court. This three-tiered system ensures that the decisions of the courts of first instance can be appealed, are reviewed on appeal (de novo), and reviewed by a cassation appeal.

The departments of the Supreme Court, as a court of cassation instance, examine cases in the cassation procedure, while the Civil Cases Chamber examines cases on appeal. The Civil Cases Tribunal ended on December 31, 2016.

The Saeima approves judges of the Supreme Court. The current Supreme Court Chief Justice is Aigars Strupišs (since 2020).

Historically, the term Senate of Latvia refers to the Supreme Court that operated during 1918-1940, i.e., from the establishment of the Republic of Latvia until its occupation by the Soviet Union. In 2018 the Saeima passed amendments to the Judicial Power Act restoring the Court's right to use the historical name Senate alongside Supreme Court. Justices may also therefore be referred to as Senators.

== See also ==
- Constitutional Court of Latvia
